= Anne Foster =

Fictional character from Coronation Street

- Coronation Street character
- Portrayed by: Gwen Taylor
- Duration: 2011–2012
- First appearance: 4 September 2011
- Last appearance: 19 March 2012
- Introduced by: Phil Collinson
In-universe information
- Occupation: Businesswoman; Office assistant
- Husband: Sam Foster (until 2012)
- Sons: Frank Foster

Anne Foster is a fictional character from the ITV soap opera Coronation Street, played by Gwen Taylor. Anne is the mother of Frank Foster (Andrew Lancel) and wife of Sam Foster (Paul Clayton). The character and casting was announced on 4 August 2011. Taylor revealed she had found her first day on set "terrifying", but she quickly settled in. A reporter for the Western Mail branded Anne a "pompous matriarch". Taylor said that after being revealed as Frank's killer after a whodunit storyline, she fears that she will be hated in real life. She also admitted that she only knew the identity of Frank's killer when Lancel revealed it to her during filming and added that she loved filming her scenes as Anne. Taylor made her first appearance as Anne on 4 September 2011. She made her last appearance on 19 March 2012.

== Creation and casting ==
Anne made her first on screen appearance on 4 September 2011. The character and casting was announced on 4 August 2011. Taylor revealed she had found her first day on set "terrifying", but she quickly settled in. Anne was married to Sam Foster (Paul Clayton) and is the mother of Frank (Andrew Lancel). Of Anne and Sam, a show spokesperson said "Sam and Anne are pretty full -on characters, like Frank. No sooner have they arrived than they're talking grandchildren which instantly freaks Carla out and tensions soon rise."

Taylor admitted in March 2012 that adjusting to the tight soap schedule was a challenge. Taylor said she was impressed with the acting skills of the regular cast, especially the one with children. She commented: "I'm going to remember the commitment that everyone had for the work. A lot of the women there had babies and young children, but everyone turned up on time and knew their lines - and I was so impressed by that." When signing to play Anne, Taylor had no idea that she would be playing a killer. The actress departed from Coronation Street in March 2012, after the conclusion to Frank's murder storyline.

== Development ==
After Frank's fiancé, Carla Connor (Alison King), accuses him of raping her and calls off the wedding, Anne supports her son. She installs herself at Underworld to protect Frank's half of the business and makes Carla's life a misery. Of Anne's support for Frank, Taylor said "In Anne's eyes, Frank can do no wrong. She'll do whatever it takes to protect him. If he tells her he didn't do it, then he didn't do it. There are plenty of mums out there like that. When the recent riots happened, some women refused point blank to believe their children had been involved. So mums can be a pretty loyal bunch, for good or ill."

In January 2012, it was announced that Frank would be killed in an upcoming "whodunnit" storyline. A reporter for the Metro later announced that five regular characters would become suspects during the investigation into Frank's murder. Frank was found dead on the floor of the Underworld factory by Sally Webster (Sally Dynevor). The Metro reporter said Sally comes under suspicion when she is found standing over Frank's body with bloodied hands. Carla, Peter Barlow (Chris Gascoyne) and Michelle Connor (Kym Marsh) are questioned by the police, while Sally's ex-husband, Kevin (Michael Le Vell), also fell under suspicion. Anne was not listed among the characters, but Sarah Ellis of Inside Soap included Anne as an additional suspect during a feature on Frank's death. Ellis stated that Anne develops a motive for killing Frank after she discovers his true colours, despite believing he could do no wrong. Anne was devastated as she realised that she had got her son so wrong. Ellis pointed out that Anne played every inch the grieving mother and by blaming other people for her son's death, she could have been covering her own tracks. Ellis added that it must have been painful for Anne to realise that she had raised a monster, so maybe she decided to get rid of him. Numerous viewers correctly guessed that Anne was Frank's murderer, including singer Cheryl Cole. During an interview with Lancel, which was broadcast on Radio City, Taylor admitted that while people had suspected her, she thought it would be a surprise when she was revealed to be Frank's killer.

Taylor also revealed people had also confronted her in public, having recognised her from the soap. Taylor admitted that she only knew the identity of Frank's killer when Lancel revealed it to her during filming. She explained "It was strange, because I didn't know when I signed on that it was going to develop so brilliantly. But a little while after, Andrew was telling me that he was leaving at a certain point." Taylor also said she loved filming her "showdown" with Carla when she tries to call emergency services. 10.2 million viewers saw Anne reveal herself as Frank's killer. Lancel said that he enjoyed watching the revelation of his character's killer. Speaking of the secrecy of the plot, Lancel said he and Taylor lied to everyone and they were relieved when the truth came out. Taylor joked that "she may need a bodyguard" after viewers saw Anne's twisted side. She also said that it was draining playing Anne but also brilliant.

== Storylines ==
Anne and her husband, Sam Foster (Paul Clayton), arrive to celebrate their son, Frank's (Andrew Lancel), engagement to Carla Connor (Alison King). Following a car accident involving Frank and Carla, Anne and Sam go to the hospital to check on them.

Anne later returns to tell Carla that she will be taking over Frank's share of the business until Frank is cleared of raping Carla. Anne joins Frank at his new factory and is very pleased to hear that Carla has had a meltdown and fired the workers. Michelle Connor (Kym Marsh) hears what Frank has done to Carla and goes to Frank's factory to bring everyone back to work at Underworld, angering Anne. Anne tries to persuade Carla to drop the charges in exchange for Frank's share of Underworld but Carla refuses and throws her out of her home. Anne goes on a cruise with Sam and a couple of days later she phones Frank and tells him his father has died. Anne comes home and initially struggles with her grief, blaming Carla for Sam's death and confronts her at the factory. Anne returns to work with Frank and Sally Webster (Sally Dynevor) and they return to Underworld, alongside Carla and Michelle. Anne later learns that Frank is having an affair with Jenny Sumner (Niky Wardley) behind Sally's back and tells her so Frank then fires Anne and tells her to go home.

Anne is devastated when Frank is found dead in the factory. She sees Frank's body being removed from Underworld and tells the police that she believes Carla killed Frank. She later notices the contract that gave Frank full ownership of Underworld is missing and accuses Carla of stealing it. Sally realises Frank's watch is missing and Anne assures her she will tell the police. Anne attends Frank's funeral with Sally and apologises to Carla, which Carla finds suspicious. She later goes home alone and Sally visits her. She sees that Anne has Frank's watch and assumes that the police have returned it until Anne admits that she has had it all along. Sally realises that Anne killed Frank and tries to leave but trips and hits her head. Anne, however, calmly continues packing her bags until Carla arrives, wanting to know why Anne apologised earlier. Carla finds Sally and goes to call an ambulance, but Anne threatens her with a knife. Anne explains that she blamed Frank for Sam's death after overhearing Frank goading Carla about the rape. She went to the factory to get his watch back, but she struggles with Frank for it. When he pushed her away, she picked up a whiskey bottle and hit him. Carla then talks Anne into dropping the knife and she is later arrested.

== Reception ==
A reporter for the Western Mail branded Anne a "pompous matriarch". Tony Stewart of the Daily Mirror called Anne a "loyal mum". Jon Wise of The People believed the show made viewers "empathise deeply" with Anne following Frank's death, while the Daily Mirror's Kevin O'Sullivan said Anne was "theatrically distraught" when she discovered her son was dead.

== See also ==
- List of soap opera villains
