= Daz (detergent) =

Laundry detergent brand

- Product type: Laundry detergent
- Current owner: Bluesun
- Country: UK
- Introduced: February 1953; 73 years ago

Daz is the name of a laundry detergent on the market in the United Kingdom and Ireland. It was introduced in February 1953. It is manufactured by Bluesun, who acquired Daz from Procter & Gamble in March 2024. Aggressively marketed, it is associated in popular culture with the "Daz Doorstep Challenge" series of commercials, which saw various 'hosts' including Danny Baker, Shane Richie and Michael Barrymore surprising house occupiers by asking them to put Daz to the test against a rival detergent. The advert was spoofed by Dom Joly in the British sketch series Trigger Happy TV and in a John Smith's advertising campaign featuring Peter Kay. From 1999 to 2002 Julian Clary was the face of Daz laundry detergent, one of the first of his advert campaigns being a "Wash Your Dirty Linen in Public" roadshow with Daz Tablets.

Daz is available in powder (handwash and automatic) and liquid.

== Cleaner Close advertising campaign ==
From 2002 to 2019, Daz began a series of soap opera style adverts called Cleaner Close. Some of these featured a new packet of Daz or a prize give-away as part of the plot, such as a character who either hid money in Daz packets or donated money to Daz in their will.

Other episodes have a character who do not use Daz which causes them problems, which are solved by a character who uses Daz. Cleaner Close is a parody of Coronation Street, Brookside or EastEnders. Most of the adverts feature ex-soap stars, sometimes portrayed as a similar character to the one they played in their original soap, and are narrated by Tony Hirst; who would later star in both Hollyoaks and Coronation Street. Soap stars or ex-soap stars to have appeared in Cleaner Close include: Michelle Collins (Cindy Beale in EastEnders, Stella Price in Coronation Street), Alison King (Carla Connor in Coronation Street), Chris O'Dowd (Brendan Davenport in The Clinic), Jennifer Ellison (Emily Shadwick in Brookside) and Julie Goodyear (Bet Lynch in Coronation Street).
