= Siege Week =

- Coronation Street episodes
- Robbie and Carla at the factory
- Episode nos.: Episodes 7352–7356
- Directed by: Ian Bevitt; David Kester
- Written by: Martin Allen; Mark Wadlow; Stephen Russell; Chris Fewtrell; Joe Turner
- Original air date: 31 May 2010 – 9 June 2010
- Running time: 30 minutes (including adverts)

"Siege Week" is a week-long special of the British soap opera Coronation Street, which was broadcast from 31 May 2010 to 9 June 2010 on ITV. This was the first time that the programme was broadcast in high definition. The six 30-minute episodes were directed by Ian Bevitt and David Kester, and were the most expensive Coronation Street had ever produced, costing £1 million. The episodes, ranging from the 7352nd to the 7356th in the series, were written by Martin Allen, Mark Wadlow, Stephen Russell, Chris Fewtrell and Joe Turner, and produced by Kim Crowther for ITV Studios. It was filmed at the Granada Studios complex in Manchester.

The special storyline followed the soap's well-known villain Tony Gordon (Gray O'Brien) escaping from prison and with the help of his former cellmate Robbie Sloan (James Fleet), setting off to kidnap his ex-wife Carla Connor (Alison King) and Hayley Cropper (Julie Hesmondhalgh) in the Underworld factory with the intent to murder them. The episodes continued to depict the kidnapping, hostage situation and the aftermath, such as the rescue attempts of other characters and the explosive climax in which the factory was consumed by fire.

Siege Week was the first of two major events of Coronation Street in 2010, the second being the 50th anniversary tram crash which was aired in December.

== Plot summary ==
Bitter about his ex-wife Carla Connor's (Alison King) affair with Liam Connor (Rob James-Collier), Tony Gordon (Gray O'Brien) forms a plan with his cellmate Robbie Sloan (James Fleet) to break out of prison, and kidnap and kill Carla, and Hayley Cropper (Julie Hesmondhalgh) for revenge against her husband Roy (David Neilson), who convinced Tony to confess to the police that he had murdered Liam, which ended him up in jail. Robbie is released from prison and Tony fakes a heart attack. Robbie gets him out of the ambulance and they head to Weatherfield.

Carla is told by the police that Tony has escaped from prison, and told to be careful. The news spreads around the street. Robbie poses as a businessman interested in the Underworld factory, and arranges to meet Carla at the factory, which is covered in construction workers including Bill Webster (Peter Armitage) and Jason Grimshaw (Ryan Thomas). Meanwhile, Gail McIntyre's (Helen Worth) trial gets underway, as she is accused of her husband Joe's murder, although he accidentally died faking his own death for life insurance money. Tina McIntyre (Michelle Keegan) gives evidence at the trial.

Carla proceeds to showing Robbie around the empty Underworld factory and all the knickers for sale. During her sales pitch, Robbie pulls out a gun and points it at her. Shocked, she realises she has been tricked. Robbie holds Carla at gunpoint and orders her to get rid of Bill and Jason who are working on the roof. Carla phones Bill and tells him the insurance company has not paid out so they are to stop working immediately. Despite Bill's protestations, Robbie threatens Carla into remaining firm. When Bill and Jason give in, Robbie ties Carla to her desk chair in her office. She begs to be freed, but Robbie duct tapes her mouth shut, and after checking that she cannot speak or scream for help, leaves her bound and gagged in the office, unable to escape. Robbie then heads to Roy's café, and tricks Hayley into coming with him to the factory, saying that Carla has had an accident. Hayley follows him there. As she enters, she sees Carla tied up and gagged, who screams in warning but it is too late. Hayley is held at gunpoint by Robbie and tied to a chair herself. Carla is wheeled on her chair into the Underworld workers' floor to sit face-to-face with Hayley. Tony then appears in the factory. Tony rips the duct tape from Carla's mouth, allowing her to speak. When Carla demands what he wants, Tony announces his plans to murder them, terrifying them.

Carla and Tony exchange heated words about their marriage and Tony's sanity and jail sentence. Tony taunts his tied up ex-wife as she tells him he will go back to prison for even longer, when he reminds her he was given a life sentence. Tony tells Robbie how he married Carla as he was attracted to her feistiness. Tony tells Hayley that she is there as revenge against Roy, although Hayley protests Roy did nothing to him. It is revealed that Robbie has kidnapped Carla and Hayley to earn money for his estranged son's university tuition fees, and Tony has promised him £2,000. Carla taunts Robbie, attempting to manipulate him into setting them free, but it doesn't work. Although Carla's bonds are too tight, Hayley is managing to slip free, although Tony notices before she can untie herself and tightens the restraints. Tony then discovers the money from the Underworld factory is missing and that he cannot pay Robbie. He demands from Carla to know where the money is but she does not know. Carla and Hayley try to convince Robbie to phone the police but he refuses. When Robbie becomes more and more anxious about getting his money, he threatens Tony with his gun. Carla and Hayley try to scream for help but they cannot be heard through the factory walls. Despite Carla's pleads, Robbie allows Tony to manipulate him, and Robbie gives him the gun. Tony then shoots Robbie dead.

Maria Connor (Samia Smith) then appears at the factory door, demanding answers from Carla. Tony gags Hayley's mouth with duct tape, and forces Carla to answer the door and holds a gun to her while remaining hidden. Carla tries to get rid of Maria with the gun on her but eventually tries to warn Maria of Tony and tells her to run. Tony immediately pushes Carla to the ground, knocking her unconscious, and pulls Maria into the factory. Tony puts the sleeping Carla back in her chair and ties her up again. Tony tries to convince Maria that he is doing a good thing killing Carla and that he killed Liam for them. Carla awakens and manages to loosen the ropes around her hands slightly. Maria turns to leave. Tony threatens to shoot Carla in the head if Maria leaves, but she still escapes, knowing Tony will not pull the trigger. Maria raises the alarm with the residents that Tony is holding Carla and Hayley hostage. The residents try to break in to rescue the pair. Roy desperately tries to get into the factory and begs Tony not to harm Hayley. Tony starts to douse Underworld in petrol to set the factory on fire. Struggling to untie herself from her restraints, Carla begs Tony not to kill them, but he refuses, stating "she cast the first stone" by sleeping with Liam. Carla begins to plead for Hayley's release, saying that she should be punished for sleeping with Liam, but that Hayley has done nothing wrong. Tony finally relents, gagging Hayley and throwing her outside. Tony then states that he and Carla will die together.

Tony enjoys a final drink in the factory while the police and residents gather outside. Carla, still tied to her chair, tries to convince Tony to untie her so that they can have a drink to celebrate, attempting to get free or buy herself more time. Tony then demands to know why she slept with Liam, and she begins to emotionally break down, terrified of being killed. Tony mocks her for her tears. Desperate, she pleads for her life, and offers to have a baby with Tony so that they can live a happy life together but Tony refuses and sets the factory on fire. Just as the flames surround the factory, Carla finally manages to break free of her bonds just in time and hits Tony over the head. As she makes to escape, he grabs her and they fight violently on the floor. She bites him to get out of his grasp but cannot get out of the factory doors as they are locked. He tries to prevent her from leaving but she fights furiously to escape. She finally manages to escape the factory and runs out onto the street. Tony decides not to chase her but instead goes back into the burning factory, which then explodes, killing him as all the residents watch.

== Production ==
=== Filming ===
The 'Siege Week' took four weeks to film and used a purpose-built set. The crew built an exact fireproof replica of the Underworld factory for some of the most difficult scenes filmed at Quay Street.

Alison King underwent gun training before shooting her scenes, and insisted on doing many of her own stunts. King needed emergency oxygen after filming in the smoke-filled room during the scenes of the factory being on fire. She said: "There were a few cuts and bruises. I got a black eye at one point, and I got a sty in my eye. There were just normal bruises from when you are throwing yourself around on set and your adrenaline gets a bit much and you do more than you perhaps should have, but it's all exciting." King performed all stunts herself, except one that consisted of a jump from a balcony, and suffered minor injuries. In 2016, King called the scenes "challenging to film". King commented on filming the majority of scenes of the 'Siege Week' tied up and gagged, saying "We were tied up and gagged for a week and a half. I was gaffa-taped for a little while and tied up for most of it. My wrist was sore at the end! It was a different experience anyway, acting for two weeks with your hands tied behind your back on a chair. Kym Marsh was like, 'You loved it!'" When looking back on the Siege Week, she spoke of how "It's always good to film the big stunt stuff, it's always what people remember, however it's often the least pleasurable to film...it's just so intoxicating," and commented on the cast she worked with, saying "James Fleet who played Tony's old prison mate Robbie who held Carla and Hayley hostage was sensational to work with. It was also the first time Julie Hesmondhalgh and I worked together for weeks on end which was fantastic. We had a great director in David Kester too."

Julie Hesmondhalgh said she was delighted to be part of the storyline. Samia Smith returned from maternity leave especially to film the siege episodes. She said, "It didn't feel like we were filming Corrie. Because the set was purposely made it felt like we were on a drama as the pace was a lot slower". King commented that it was "fantastic" to have Gray O'Brien back, saying "We enjoy working with each other and we have a set way of working together – reading the scripts three times, rehearsing and doing everything in advance. There was a lot of pressure filming these scenes and he was just brilliant. We had to get it done in the time we had and because of that, we had to lean on each other quite a lot." Hesmondhalgh joked that she had to tell King to stop groping her while she was tied to a chair, commenting "It was absolutely hysterical because Ali's so funny, and she's not at all what she looks like. She looks so polished and like a film star – but she's just a dirty old bitch really! She couldn't stop feeling me up when I was tied up. I was shouting, 'Get off me!' So many people would have paid so much money to be in my position, but I was like, 'Get off me – stop feeling me boobs!'" Hesmondhalgh and King joked that they developed a "telepathic understanding" while they were gagged. She said "We could tell from our eyes what we were trying to relate."

== Characters and cast ==
- Zennon Ditchett as Aadi Alahan
- Tanisha Gorey as Asha Alahan
- Jimmi Harkishin as Dev Alahan
- Shobna Gulati as Sunita Alahan
- Elle Mulvaney as Amy Barlow
- Anne Kirkbride as Deirdre Barlow
- William Roache as Ken Barlow
- Kate Ford as Tracy Barlow
- Vicky Entwistle as Janice Battersby
- Rachel Leskovac as Natasha Blakeman
- Katy Cavanagh as Julie Carp
- Malcolm Hebden as Norris Cole
- Alison King as Carla Connor
- Samia Smith as Maria Connor
- Kym Marsh as Michelle Connor
- Ben Thompson as Ryan Connor
- Julie Hesmondhalgh as Hayley Cropper
- David Neilson as Roy Cropper
- Steve Jackson as Trevor Dean
- Alan Halsall as Tyrone Dobbs
- Susan McCardle as Lyn Fullwood
- Gray O'Brien as Tony Gordon
- Sue Cleaver as Eileen Grimshaw
- Ryan Thomas as Jason Grimshaw
- Keith Duffy as Ciaran McCarthy
- Katherine Kelly as Becky McDonald
- Simon Gregson as Steve McDonald
- Helen Worth as Gail McIntyre
- Michelle Keegan as Tina McIntyre
- Steven Arnold as Ashley Peacock
- Julia Haworth as Claire Peacock
- Jack P. Shepherd as David Platt
- Craig Gazey as Graeme Proctor
- Sue Nicholls as Audrey Roberts
- James Fleet as Robbie Sloan
- Jennie McAlpine as Fiz Stape
- Andy Whyment as Kirk Sutherland
- Patti Clare as Mary Taylor
- Ben Price as Nick Tilsley
- Antony Cotton as Sean Tully
- Peter Armitage as Bill Webster
- Debbie Rush as Anna Windass
- Steve Huison as Eddie Windass
- Mikey North as Gary Windass
- Pip Torrens as Prosecution Q.C.

== Broadcast ==
Prior to the broadcast, star King praised the storyline, teasing: "If anyone can escape from prison, it's Tony Gordon. You just know when he manages to get out that he's got an even bigger screw lose that he had before. It makes great television and I'm really pleased to be part of it. It's nice to wrap it all up, too." Previously in April 2010, King told Glasgow's Sunday Mail she thought "If Tony was to come back I think Carla would fear for life. That would be pretty gruesome for her but working with Gray again would be good. He's brilliant. It is a different experience every day. He can misbehave like the rest of them but he's good with me." In February 2010, the soap's producer Kim Crowther said that Tony's return would be "as dramatic as anything we've done with him so far".

The first episode aired on Monday at 7 pm, followed by a special 9 pm show that night and for the next four evenings. Peter Fincham, ITV's director of television, channels and online, said: 'With...the explosive return of one of Coronation Street's most notorious villains, it's a huge week for ITV and our viewers. I'm particularly delighted that both shows will be available in high definition for the first time on ITV HD.'

Following the Cumbria shootings, that occurred on 2 June 2010, the Siege Week was temporarily taken off-air, as it was felt that the storyline was too similar to real life events. The remaining siege episodes were transmitted the following week instead, in a heavily truncated schedule. It was postponed until Monday 7 June, and aired throughout the week every night except the Tuesday.

== Reception ==
The 9 pm first night of 'Siege Week' was an instant hit with viewers, attracting more than 500,000 viewers to the ITV HD channel on Monday 31 May.

Ian Wylie, writing for The Guardian, said that "the conclusion to Siege Week was some of the best Corrie I'd ever seen. It certainly sets the benchmark for the 50th anniversary in December."

When King left Coronation Street in 2016, she named the Siege Week as one of her five favourite moments from ten years on the show.
