= Carla Connor =

Fictional character from Coronation Street

- Coronation Street character
- Portrayed by: Alison King
- Duration: 2006–present
- First appearance: 1 December 2006
- Created by: Steve Frost
- Introduced by: Steve Frost (2006); Kate Oates (2017)
- Book appearances: Coronation Street: The Complete Saga (2008)
- Spin-off appearances: Coronation Street: Text Santa Special (2013)
- Crossover appearances: Corriedale (2026)
In-universe information
- Other names: Carla Donovan; Carla Gordon; Carla Barlow; Carla Tilsley; Carla Connor-Swain
- Occupation: Businesswoman
- Father: Johnny Connor
- Mother: Sharon Donovan
- Stepmother: Jenny Bradley
- Half-brothers: Rob Donovan; Aidan Connor
- Half-sisters: Kate Connor
- Husband: Paul Connor (1999–2007); Tony Gordon (2008–2010); Peter Barlow (2013–2014, 2021–2024); Nick Tilsley (2016–2017)
- Wife: Lisa Swain (2026–present)
- Stepsons: Simon Barlow
- Stepdaughters: Betsy Swain
- Nephews: Bobby Crawford
- Nieces: Susie Price; Connie Waring
- Other relatives: Michelle Connor; Tom Kerrigan; Liam Connor; Ali Neeson; Ryan Connor (adoptive); Liam Connor Jr.

Carla Connor (also Gordon, Barlow, and Connor-Swain) is a fictional character from the British ITV soap opera Coronation Street, played by Alison King. She made her first appearance on screen during the episode airing on 1 December 2006 and introduced as the wife of Paul Connor (Sean Gallagher). This was King's second role in the soap as she previously played Mrs. Fanshaw for one episode in 2004. King appeared in her 1,000th episode as Carla on 22 May 2015. Carla has been referred to as "the new Elsie Tanner".

King was off-screen from February 2009 until October 2009 due to her maternity leave. King later took a 6-month break in May 2012 and was offscreen from 16 July to 10 December. King quit the role in 2015 and her final scenes aired on 26 May 2016. The following year, producer Kate Oates reintroduced Carla and she returned on-screen on 22 December 2017.

Carla has had relationships with Liam Connor (Rob James-Collier), Trevor Dean (Steve Jackson) and Frank Foster (Andrew Lancel), and has been married six times to Paul Connor, Tony Gordon (Gray O'Brien), Peter Barlow (Chris Gascoyne) (twice), Nick Tilsley (Ben Price), and Lisa Swain (Vicky Myers). Her storylines include finding out Paul has been having affairs with escorts which eventually leads to him being killed in a car crash, having an affair with Liam and Tony killing him when he discovers it, being kidnapped in her factory by Tony and escaping when the building explodes (known as "Siege Week"), battling alcoholism, drink driving and running over Stella Price (Michelle Collins), being raped by Frank, attempting suicide, becoming a suspect in Frank's murder, an affair and marriage with Peter, learning that Peter has been having an affair with Tina McIntyre (Michelle Keegan), suffering a miscarriage because of the stress, being a suspect in Tina’s murder, escaping a fire at her flat started by her arch-enemy Tracy Barlow (Kate Ford), coping when people blame her for starting the fire which leads to her alcoholism returning and developing a gambling addiction, almost attempting suicide when the guilt over the fire becomes too much before her innocence is revealed, learning that family friend Johnny Connor (Richard Hawley) is actually her biological father, being blackmailed by Tracy and later trying to kill her which leads to two car crashes on the street, suffering from kidney failure and undergoing a kidney transplant with her half-brother Aidan Connor (Shayne Ward), dealing with Aidan's suicide, a feud with Alya Nazir (Sair Khan) over the ownership of the Underworld factory, attempting to frame Abi Franklin (Sally Carman) for arson, and becoming a public enemy through her workaholism which leads to the factory roof fatally collapsing and her subsequent psychotic episode - during which she went missing for a month and was raped again. After re-marrying Peter, he leaves for a new life, and Carla begins a same-sex relationship with Lisa. Since then, she has been attacked in underworld, had her head injury from the attack cause sepsis which leads to kidney failure, undergone a second kidney transplant with her half-brother Rob, been kidnapped by Rob and later held hostage by him along with Lisa. It was revealed that Lisa’s “dead” wife was actually alive and after successfully causing a break-up between Carla and Lisa, Becky kidnaps Carla and leaves her for dead. Once reconciled, Carla and Lisa got married making Coronation Street history as the first sapphic couple to successfully do so.

== Casting and development ==
On 20 September 2006, it was reported that the former Dream Team actress Alison King had been cast as Carla Connor. A Coronation Street spokeswoman said of the new addition, "she will make quite an impact. The phrase 'dosh doesn’t make you posh' was made for Carla. She's a WAG on the cobbles, beautiful but tough and ambitious". King had briefly appeared on the Manchester soap in 2004, as a housewife named Mrs. Fanshaw, who slept with Jason Grimshaw (Ryan Thomas). She later joked "I was Mrs Fanshaw – or Fanny. What a nightmare!" Metro also incorrectly reported she had previously played a character called Milly Webster in 1982, a part that was played by another actress with the same name. She said that she initially found the role difficult, as she "was uncomfortable playing a constant bitch at first. I'm getting into it now but I'm not as nasty or as cocky as Carla. She's horrible to anyone she perceives to be a rival. I couldn't be like that." In November 2010, she admitted her character "annoys the hell" out of her, saying "I would never be her mate in a million years! Carla's a nightmare and annoys the hell out of me. She's the type of person who creates drama wherever she goes, and I'm not like that at all. Plus, she'd probably try to steal my fella!" She has also said she hates the voice she chose for the character.

In 2010, she talked of how long she would stay at Coronation Street, and that she had no worries for her career afterwards, saying "I'll have done four years in Coronation Street in October but because I had more or less a year out it still feels very fresh. I'm certainly in no rush to get out of it. I'm really lucky to be in this job. But I had a great career before I came into the show – 11 years working non-stop. Hopefully I wouldn't be too scared to do a few more silly action films if I could get them under my belt. I'll know when it's time to go but I'm not there yet." In January 2012, she said she would not leave soon, and would play Carla until "I get bored of her." In July 2013, King spoke of her future on Coronation Street, saying "I don't know whether I'll be here forever – I'd love to have a go at different things, like an action drama or love story. But as long as I'm happy in the role and the producers will have me, I'll be staying put for now." In October 2014, she said "I'm happy so long as I'm happy and I'm getting good storylines."

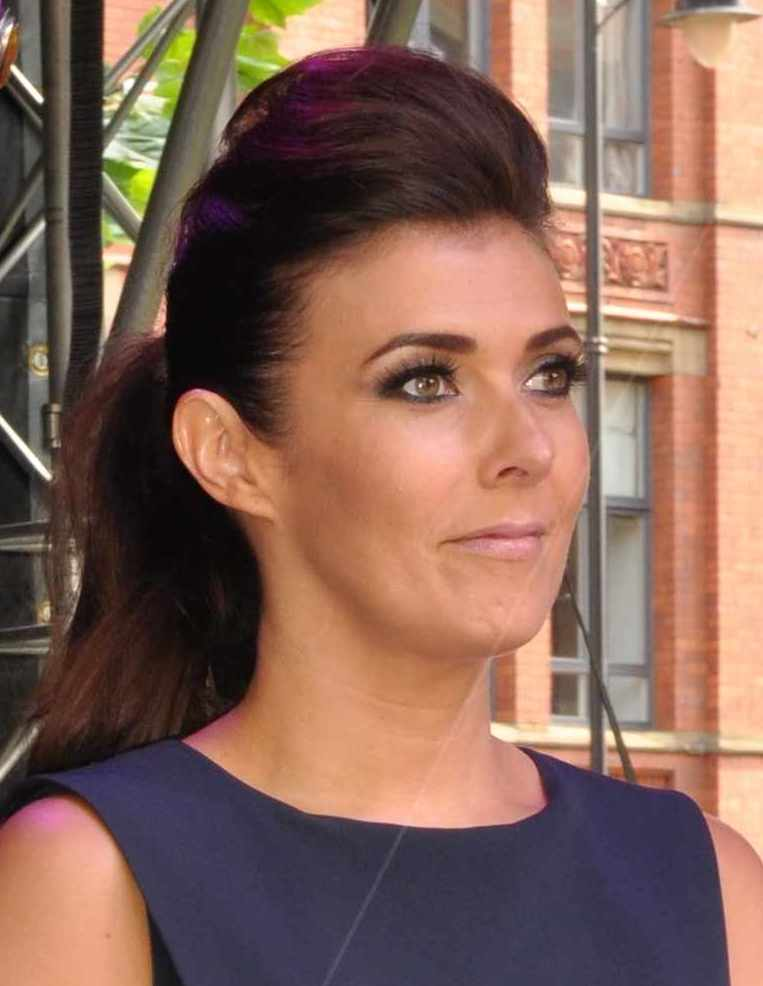
Kym Marsh (pictured) portrayed Michelle Connor, who was Carla's best friend and one-time sister-in-law.

=== Backstory ===
Carla is stated to have been born on 3 January 1975 in Manchester. She was born into a world of alcohol and drugs, which Sharon sold from Carla's pram. Sharon had plenty of boyfriends and, a few years after Carla was born, she gave birth to her second child, Rob (Marc Baylis). She went on to marry George, who mistreated Carla and Rob and was hated by them. Carla's best friends growing up were Michelle (Kym Marsh), Paul (Sean Gallagher) and Liam Connor (Rob James-Collier) who lived in the nicer part of the estate. Carla later married Paul in 1999 and left her family. Rob was later sent to Strangeways prison for armed robbery in 2004. Carla's family also used to know the Kerrigans as they were part of the Connor family. The Kerrigans included Tom (Philip McGinley) who later appeared on the street.

=== Underworld siege ===
In March 2010, it was reported that Carla's husband Tony Gordon portrayed by Gray O'Brien would escape from prison resulting in Carla being put in grave danger. Robbie Sloan, portrayed by Vicar of Dibley star James Fleet who is Tony's cellmate and has been bribed to aid the escape. According to The Sun newspaper: "Robbie is freed from jail – having been due for release – and meets Carla (Alison King) under the pretence that he is a trader who wants to buy lingerie cheaply. Having arranged a further meeting with Carla on the planned jailbreak day, he returns to visit jail and creates a diversion by sparking a fight with another inmate. As wardens attempt to break up the altercation, Tony feigns a heart attack and is transported to the hospital for treatment. However, Robbie is waiting for the ambulance and threatens the guards at gunpoint before securing Tony's escape."

In April 2010, it was revealed that Tony was to hold Carla and Hayley Cropper (Julie Hesmondhalgh) captive at Underworld after escaping from prison. Lured into the factory alone by Robbie's businessman façade, Carla was bound and gagged in a desolate Underworld with Hayley Cropper, who had also been lured to the factory. Tony arrives at the factory, and eventually lets Hayley go free before setting the building on fire. In subsequent scenes, viewers saw Carla untie herself, grab Tony's gun and fire a shot which wounds him. While Carla manages to escape the burning factory, Tony dies in the blaze. Police later examine his body and assume that the bullet killed him. It was later reported that Carla was to be wrongly charged with murder in the storyline following this Carla is later released, however, this never happened.

=== Relationships ===
==== Peter Barlow ====
In July 2010, The Sun newspaper reported that an upcoming storyline would see Carla face a drinking problem after King was pictured filming a visit to alcoholics anonymous. An insider told the paper: "She sees Peter Barlow (Chris Gascoyne) at the meeting and backs out, pretending she is meant to be in a Spanish class next door."

In July 2011, it was reported that Carla will drunkenly drive her car into the bookies, injuring Stella in the process. This was the result of further rejections from Peter. A source told The Sun: "Carla's drinking is out of control again, it's a cry for help – and for love". The show's producer, Phil Collinson recently teased a storyline seeing Carla's feelings for Peter to arise once again. Collinson said: "I have to say, it's one of the biggest stories that we've told on Corrie for many years. She's going to have a pretty rough time across the autumn."

In September 2010, it was reported that Carla would fall for Peter. It was reported that the pair apparently grow closer as Peter helps Carla overcome her boozing and comes to her aid when she is arrested for drink driving. A source said: "Carla is feeling vulnerable and Peter is there," a source told the paper. "They soon become more than friends. He's stunned when she tells him she hasn't felt like this about anyone since Liam." Carla's best friend Leanne (Jane Danson) who is in a relationship with Peter would tell Carla that she is in love with her ex-husband Nick Tilsley (Ben Price), "This storyline will really put the cat among the pigeons," the source added.

Alison King later told Inside Soap that she wants Carla's friendship with Peter to develop even further as he helps her to battle alcohol addiction. King said: "I think she should definitely gets her claws into Peter. They've got a nice friendship and some good banter going on. They're equals, and I think it's the first time Carla's felt that way with someone since Liam died. They could be a great coupling – but it would turn into a nightmare if they both fell off the wagon."

Upon Carla’s return in December 2017, the pair became infatuated with each other once again and they later got back together in 2019 after he supported her through her psychotic episode. In May 2020, it was revealed that Carla has a secret that will bring conflict between the pair. Speaking about what’s to come for Carla, producer Iain MacLeod teased: "It pertains to when she went missing during her mental health crisis. We wanted to visit that when she is back on an even keel psychologically. We saw glimpses – with the hotel – it was an interesting development to reveal something we didn’t know previously." He stated that "Peter will seemingly discover said secret, which will inevitably bring with it more conflict for the two" Iain said: "Peter and Carla and the Burton and Taylor of the cobbles – at their best at their most explosive. They have big, heartrending challenges to overcome. What he discovers is a hard thing to swallow but ultimately he will be all the more proud of her and love her all the more. But they have a rocky road ahead."

==== Frank Foster ====
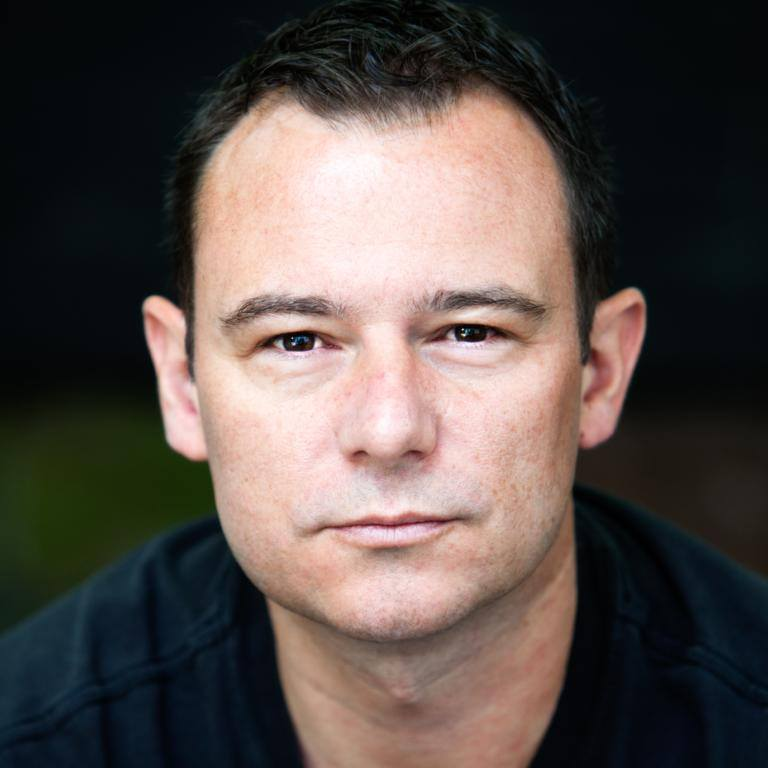
Carla was involved in a relationship storyline with Frank Foster played by Andrew Lancel (pictured).

In June 2011, it was announced that Carla will reportedly be left "fighting for her life" after being attacked by her boyfriend. The factory owner, played by Alison King, would be subjected to a physical and sexual assault by Frank Foster after he suspects she is cheating on him with Peter Barlow. Carla will consider leaving Frank prior to the attack, but feels she owes him after he invested in her business and takes the blame for a car accident she is responsible for. The plot was a prominent storyline over the summer and aired after the 9pm watershed during a week of special episodes. Tracy Barlow will offer to give Frank a positive character reference in court, while Peter's marriage to Leanne suffers.

On 3 February 2012, Coronation Street confirmed Frank would be killed off as part of a whodunit storyline. The news came shortly after the episode showing Frank being found not guilty of raping Carla was broadcast. A writer for the official Coronation Street website said "Now events will take an even more dramatic turn as tensions rise and vengeance will be on the minds of several characters, climaxing in Frank's death! And with so many residents having a motive for killing the twisted factory boss – the list of suspects reads like a 'Who's Who' of Weatherfield." Over the following weeks, Frank manages to alienate himself as he tries to get revenge on Carla for dragging him through court. Lancel said Frank's true colours would be exposed and he does not think his life is in danger for a moment. His body would be found in the factory, following "days of arguments and confrontations with associates, lovers and enemies alike." A reporter for the Metro later announced that five regular characters would become suspects during the investigation into Frank's murder. Frank would be found dead on the floor of the Underworld factory by Sally Webster. The Metro reporter said Sally comes under suspicion when she is found standing over Frank's body with bloodied hands. Carla, Peter and Michelle are questioned by the police, while Sally's ex-husband, Kevin, will also fall under suspicion. Lancel praised his character's final storyline, calling it "classic Corrie". It was later revealed that Frank's mother, Anne, was the killer during a showdown between her, Carla, Sally and Kevin.

==== Rob Donovan ====
In March 2012, it was announced that Carla's younger brother Rob Donovan would be arriving later in the year. Carla had previously mentioned a brother. Speaking of the announcement a Coronation Street spokesperson said: "We are seeing lots of different actors over the next week or so. We have got some exciting storylines lined up for Carla's younger brother. He is a character the fans have been keen to meet for some time". In May 2012, it was announced that actor Marc Baylis had been cast to play Rob. Speaking of his casting Baylis said: "I feel incredibly honoured to be joining the very talented cast of Coronation Street. Rob is an exciting character to play and I am hoping he is going to ruffle a few Weatherfield feathers". Producer Phil Collinson said: "I'm very pleased to welcome Marc to the cast – the latest in a long line of handsome Corrie charmers. Carla's brother Rob is sure to set hearts fluttering in Weatherfield from the minute he arrives. The audience can expect thrills and a few broken hearts when this handsome bad boy hits town." Rob departed in November 2014 and returned later in December 2015 whilst he was in prison for murdering Tina.January 2024 Rob is back again because his sister Carla has sepsis and needs a new kidney his son Bobby contacted him and went to visit him.

=== Temporary departure ===
In May 2012, it was reported that Carla would depart with her boyfriend Peter Barlow (Chris Gascoyne) in 2012, for four months. Speaking of her departure King said: "It's three years since I had a baby and I've been working for all of that time so I haven't been able to spend too much time with my family. I plan to have a nice holiday and spend time at home getting jobs done on the house, all very normal stuff. King insisted that she still enjoys playing Carla and has no plans to depart for good. King's exit scenes aired on 16 July 2012, she returned to filming on 1 October 2012 and was back on screen in December, and shows boss announced that Carla and Peter would return at Christmas with big news.

=== Expansion of family ===
In 2015, Coronation Street introduced three new members of the Connor family, consisting of Aidan (Shayne Ward), Kate (Faye Brookes) and Johnny Connor (Richard Hawley). Producer Stuart Blackburn told Digital Spy that there would be a real shocker for Carla after she receives news from one of the new Connors. Blackburn commented: "The Connors are looking great. I think in Aidan, Johnny and Kate, we've really hit gold. One of those characters will deliver a bit of news to Carla that will change her sense of self and perception forever. It's going to be a real shocker."

=== Departure ===
On 1 May 2015, it was reported that King would be "taking a break" in 2016. A Coronation Street spokeswoman said in a statement released to Digital Spy: "Alison King has indicated to producers that she would like to take a sabbatical from the show for creative reasons at some point in 2016. She wishes to try her hand at other projects before returning to the part of Carla Connor, a role she has enjoyed playing for nine years. Before Ali takes her break, Carla has much more drama to come. At the end of this month, she will be central to the explosive storyline which sees Victoria Court go up in flames, and the aftermath of that plotline will have huge consequences for the factory boss. Ali's desire to take a break from the show gives the writers the opportunity to come up with an enthralling exit for the character." In September 2015, King said in an interview: "I have just signed till May 2016, there is a lot to do with Carla yet. I haven't had a chance to think about beyond that. On 8 January 2016, it was confirmed that King's departure was in fact permanent. King told Metro: "It's not actually a break – I'm actually leaving. Because they're leaving the door open, I think people originally called it a break and people are asking 'When are you coming back?' and I'm like 'I'm not'".

A storyline was created to build up to her departure. A special week aired from 22 to 26 May alongside the Britain's Got Talent semi-final just like in previous years. A trailer also accompanied the shows and after each episode, a preview of the next episode was shown. The episodes had to be broadcast at 9 pm because of the content within them. Two storylines were put into this week, the wedding and the discovery of Callum Logan's (Sean Ward) body. This involved the Platt family heavily and Carla caused the crash into the house where the body was hidden, finishing the storyline from his murder which had started in September 2015. King filmed her final scenes in April 2016 with them being broadcast on 26 May 2016.

=== Reintroduction ===
In August 2017, after numerous rumours earlier in the year, it was officially announced that King would return to her role as Carla Connor in December that year. Co-stars Kym Marsh [Michelle] and Shayne Ward [Aidan] talked of their delight that King was returning, and that they couldn't wait to work with her again. Marsh said of King's return "I’m extremely excited, I can’t wait – we’ve missed her and she’s missed us. I love Alison King. Me and her have been very close." Coronation Street producer Kate Oates said she would "break new ground" with Carla, and doesn’t intend to force the character back into a destructive cycle of misery but will instead reinvigorate her feisty side. Carla Connor's exit storyline had been criticised for making her leave "powerless and in disgrace." Writing in Radio Times at the time of the character's departure, David Brown criticised her leaving storyline as being "cruel" and "undeserved", saying "After all, this is a woman who – during her ten years on screen – has been held hostage, raped, suffered a miscarriage, contemplated suicide and had two husbands die on her," commenting that "we want our soap femme fatales to exit with their heads held high." Oates has said that Carla Connor will clash with her best friend Michelle Connor when she returns, saying "The Carla that we see is very different to the Carla who left the Street a couple of years ago. I really wanted to bring back that feisty side to the character and while it's right that she and Michelle will have some tension ahead, there’s a different – and quite unexpected – story which initially brings her back at the end of the year." Oates has stated she would like to keep King in the show for as long as possible. A Digital Spy article stated that Carla is likely to return as "the fearless and feisty woman we all fell in love with way back when." King returned to filming Coronation Street on 10 October 2017. On 17 October, Kym Marsh said "Alison King had her first week back on the Cobbles last week and it was like she's never been away. Everyone's so pleased to have her back. Ali's back sharing a dressing room with me and Faye Brookes. It's temporary as it's a tight squeeze, but it's nice to have a natter while our hair and make-up is being done." In September 2017, Radio Times named King's character Carla Connor as number two in the category "10 soap characters who refuse to die", describing how "if soap characters got a prize for suffering, then Carla would take home the trophy", citing her surviving almost being burned to death twice, being kidnapped and crashing vehicles. On 20 November 2017, her return was teased when Michelle spoke to her on the phone and the next day, Sharon Marshall confirmed on This Morning that Carla's return scenes would be broadcast on 22 December 2017.

=== Mental breakdown and stand-alone episode ===
In December 2018, it was reported that Carla would have a mental breakdown in 2019 after her colleagues blame her for a roof collapse at the factory. It was revealed that it would become apparent that Carla is being targeted. Producer Iain MacLeod explained that the collapse "will trigger a massive story for Carla because it impacts massively on her mental health" and that she feels "correctly that everybody is out to get her and she spirals off into a slightly delusional state". It was also confirmed that Carla would get a stand-alone episode, which has been compared to MacLeod's production at Emmerdale, in which he created an episode focused around Ashley Thomas' (John Middleton) dementia. Commenting on this, MacLeod has added, "We're doing something a little bit stylised, like the Ashley story I did at Emmerdale, but it won't be quite as extreme as that. It's a stand-alone episode that will be both mental health-focused and Carla focused. It will also be the reveal to the audience of who is behind the factory roof collapsing. I'd hesitate to put a diagnosis on what it is affecting Carla, but the factory collapse has lots of unexpected offshoots into areas that give our amazing cast a chance to show off their acting chops."

Speaking about the tone of the episode, MacLeod added: "We're inside Carla's head, but I'm still unsure about how far we explore what's real and what's not real." In the run-up to the factory disaster, a determined Carla will be seen ploughing all her energies into making the business a market leader, but this ends up having fatal consequences for her workforce: "It comes from a workaholicism story for Carla. She makes the decision that her life's priority is her work. She wants to turn the factory into a world-beating business. But that leads to her making mistakes in both her personal and professional life. She ends up getting on the wrong side of a lot of people. And by the time of the collapse, many of them will wish her ill." A trailer of the storyline, which shows Carla breaking down, was released on 11 March 2019.

== Storylines ==
Carla arrives and is furious to discover that her husband Paul had spent all the money she needed to start her children's clothing business, though to make more money she manipulated fellow factory workers Kelly Crabtree (Tupele Dorgu) and Joanne Jackson (Zaraah Abrahams) into working weekends, early mornings and late nights in order to raise money for her business. However, Kelly and Joanne eventually refuse to continue working for Carla as they became isolated from their friends and lack freedom. Carla breaks up with Paul when she finds out from Leanne Battersby (Jane Danson) he has been seeing prostitutes, and is later devastated when he dies in a car accident. Carla begins dating catalogue boss Tony Gordon (Gray O'Brien). Carla and Tony's relationship makes Liam jealous. During an argument, they kiss, confusing them both. Carla tries to stop Liam marrying Maria Sutherland (Samia Ghadie), so the two women feud. She ends things with Tony by admitting her feelings for Liam; however, Liam marries Maria so she and Tony reconcile; Tony proposes and Carla accepts. In May 2008, Carla supports Liam through the stillbirth of his and Maria's son, and the two sleep together. Carla's personal assistant, Rosie Webster (Helen Flanagan), records the pair kissing on her mobile phone. In June 2008, Carla blackmails Liam into selling his share of the factory to Tony by threatening to tell Maria about their one-night stand. In September, she invests in Tom Kerrigan (Philip McGinley) and Liam's new T-shirt business, but they agree to keep this from Tony and Maria. Tony discovers the one-night stand after viewing Rosie's video footage. Carla sleeps with Liam again prior to her wedding to Tony, and is prepared to cancel the wedding. However, she changes her mind upon discovering that Maria is pregnant. Carla is devastated by Liam's death in a hit-and-run incident orchestrated by Tony. Needing to get away, Carla postpones the wedding and goes to Los Angeles. She returns and marries Tony. Tony later confesses to Carla for being responsible for Liam's death and a horrified Carla flees to Los Angeles.

When Carla returns, she is contacted by the police after Tony confesses. Carla is attacked by thugs which break into her home. Robbie Sloan (James Fleet), Tony's cellmate, is released from prison and Tony fakes a heart attack to get out of prison. Robbie bails him out of the ambulance and they go to Weatherfield, intending to kill Carla. Robbie tricks Carla into entering the factory alone with him and holds her at gunpoint. After forcing her to evacuate the building, he leaves her bound and gagged in her office while he lures Hayley Cropper (Julie Hesmondhalgh) to the factory, who he also holds hostage. Tony appears, removes the silver duct tape from Carla's mouth, and shoots Robbie dead. He intends to burn the factory to the ground to kill Carla and Hayley, but Maria interrupts and he refuses to let her leave. Carla orders Maria to leave; she escapes. Carla manages to convince Tony to free Hayley. Tony later sets the factory on fire with petrol, whereby Carla manages to untie herself and after a struggle, she shoots Tony in the arm. She manages to flee the burning factory, however, Tony is killed when the building explodes.

Carla returns to Weatherfield and is shocked when her business partner, Nick Tilsley (Ben Price), sets up a rival factory underneath the viaduct, and refuses to work with her, but before long, Underworld is eventually repaired. Carla later invites her boyfriend, Trevor Dean (Steve Jackson) to become a trainee manager in the factory, much to Nick's annoyance. Trevor finds working in the office difficult, however, and punches Nick as Carla watches on. Nick decides to leave the factory and demands that Carla buys his shares back which cost £150,000, while Trevor leaves her to reunite with Janice Battersby (Vicky Entwistle). Carla begins drinking heavily, and is stopped by Peter Barlow (Chris Gascoyne) getting into her car. Peter decides to support her as he is also a recovering alcoholic and understands her. After being arrested for drink-driving and being collected from the police station by Peter, Carla confesses her feelings for him. Although he admits he is attracted to her, he remains faithful to Leanne Battersby (Jane Danson), his girlfriend. When Nick decides to set up a wine bar on Viaduct Street, he pressures Carla into giving him the money for his share, and she eventually remortgages her flat to get the money. Michelle later gives Carla a new idea for a product she could create in the factory. When Carla's buyer loves the idea, Carla offers Michelle a job in the office. In July 2011, Carla spends the night with her client Frank Foster (Andrew Lancel).

Carla begins dating Frank, and ignores Maria when she tells her that he sexually assaulted her. Frank and Carla get engaged, however when meeting his parents Anne (Gwen Taylor) and Sam Foster (Paul Clayton), she becomes intoxicated, arguing with Frank and Anne. She then gets in her car with Frank and drives off, running over Leanne's mother Stella Price (Michelle Collins) and crashing into Peter's bookies. Frank switches places with Carla, who is unconscious, and lies that he was driving. The night before the wedding, Carla tells Frank she cannot marry him because she is in love with Peter, so Frank angrily rapes Carla. She rings Maria, who phones the police and Frank is arrested. He is released on bail, providing that he does not approach Carla or the factory. He threatens Carla, trying to make her drop the charges but she refuses, so he plans to ruin Underworld. Carla struggles to cope and becomes more dependent on alcohol, attending meetings with Peter; they begin an affair. She attempts to commit suicide by overdosing on pills, but phones Peter, who then phones an ambulance. Carla survives and agrees to begin counselling. Carla is stunned when Stella confesses that she too was raped when she was younger, and reveals that she has never told anyone about her assault. Carla's erratic behaviour at the factory, however, quickly causes many of her clients to withdraw their orders and soon her employees find themselves with no work. As the business starts to haemorrhage money, Carla is forced to sack Becky McDonald (Katherine Kelly), Eileen Grimshaw (Sue Cleaver) and Sally Webster (Sally Dynevor). While Becky and Eileen understand, Sally is livid and demands a reason. Carla explains that Sally, unlike many of the other workers, is in a comfortable financial situation due to her ex-husband, Kevin Webster's (Michael Le Vell), large lottery win. Frank outwits Carla by employing Sally as a supervisor at his own factory. The factory is nearly bankrupted and Carla is unable to pay any due wages, causing the entire workforce to go on strike, with some defecting to Frank's factory. As Carla reaches the depths of her despair, Michelle returns and sends Carla away on holiday.

In December 2011, Peter starts drinking again. Carla goes to Peter's flat after hearing from Dev Alahan (Jimmi Harkishin) that he has taken a bottle of vodka. Peter tries to kiss Carla several times, but although she loves him, she reluctantly pulls away because of Leanne. Peter goes to leave, however, stays and sleeps with Carla, promising to leave Leanne for him. Carla spends the night and next day with Peter before he goes back to tell Leanne that their marriage is over. However, he does not, which leads to Carla feeling rejected. He is persistent and they eventually meet at Carla's flat, where they decide to reignite their affair until Peter is ready to tell Leanne. They later decide to do this after Frank's trial, since Frank was claiming as part of his defence that Carla and Peter were having an affair and plotting to falsely accuse him of rape to get rid of him. Peter and Carla are almost caught on several occasions, and Frank decides to hire a private investigator to follow Peter in the hope of catching him with Carla. The weekend before the trial, Peter arranges for them to go to a hotel in Chester, where the investigator takes pictures of them kissing outside. Peter is forced to confess to the affair when Anne, Frank's mother, hands over the photographs to Leanne in the public gallery. He comforts Carla briefly, before finding Leanne. The next day, he tells Carla, before she gives evidence against Frank, that he has left Leanne for her. Afterwards, Peter finds himself attempting to cope with his son Simon Barlow (Alex Bain), who, devastated over Leanne's departure, blames Carla and begins misbehaving for them. Carla overhears many people gossiping about her, and Stella bars her and Peter from The Rovers Return Inn.

Frank offers Carla £50,000 to buy her share of Underworld; she initially refuses but eventually accepts when Frank's "lawyer" Jenny Sumner (Niky Wardley) offers to double his money – Jenny is secretly Frank's girlfriend, and part of Frank's plan to con Carla. Carla is furious when Frank reveals his plan; it is already too late as she has signed the forms. Frank soon makes himself an endless list of enemies, and Carla goes to confront him at Underworld, where he admits he raped her and taunts her that he overpowered her easily. Later that night, Frank is found dead in the factory by Sean Tully (Antony Cotton) and Julie Carp (Katy Cavanagh), with Sally kneeling beside him with her hands covered in blood. Several residents are in the frame for Frank's murder, including Carla, Peter, Michelle, Sally and Kevin. The whiskey bottle used to kill Frank is found by Jason Grimshaw (Ryan Thomas), and he hands it to the police. Carla's fingerprints are on the bottle and she is arrested for murder but is later released without charge. Peter confesses to Frank's murder to protect Carla, but he is eliminated when a colleague of Peter's reveals that he was at his house when Frank died. It is eventually proven that Frank raped Carla when Sally reveals that he confessed it to her. Anne attacks Carla and accuses her of stealing the contract, when it was, in fact, Michelle, and Anne is warned to stay away from Carla. The police continue with their investigation, and it is revealed that Anne murdered Frank after she overheard him taunting Carla about getting away with raping her. Anne threatens Carla with a knife, before breaking down in tears and being arrested. In April 2012, Carla is informed by Frank's solicitor that Frank has left her his 40% share of the factory to her in his will, changing it when they were engaged and never changing it back; making her the sole owner of Underworld.

Carla supports Peter as he begins a custody battle against Leanne for Simon; he loses in June 2012 and Leanne wins custody. As a result, Peter begins drinking again, splitting up with Carla after a drunken row. Meanwhile, Carla's brother Rob arrives after being released from prison and begins helping her run Underworld. Carla later decides to run away with Peter after he takes Simon without Leanne's consent, however, she can see that Simon would rather be with Leanne, so Peter and Carla then leave without Simon. Carla and Peter return December 2012, just as Leanne is due to fly to Las Vegas to marry Nick. Peter is thrilled to see Simon but after Carla and Leanne get into a physical fight outside the factory, Carla admits she is struggling with being back in Weatherfield; they agree to leave again. However, Peter later admits that he cannot leave Simon again, so Carla leaves for Los Angeles alone. Carla later surprises Peter by returning on Christmas Eve, saying she could not be without him, unaware that Peter has declared his love for Leanne. Carla is furious to learn that Rob has been altering the accounts for the factory. She sacks him and he sets up his own business, stealing Carla's clients and orders. Realising that she cannot beat Rob's tricks to win over her clients, she reluctantly offers him a share of the factory. However, Carla puts him in charge of packing, angering Rob. He gives his ex girlfriend, Tracy Barlow (Kate Ford), a job in packing and she convinces him to pretend the van has been robbed whilst transporting expensive material, which they secretly sell on to another company. What Rob and Tracy are unaware of, however, is that Carla knows what they have done and asks a friend to claim to be interested in buying the material. An agreement is reached and Rob takes the material to the chosen location, only to be greeted by Carla and Peter. Tracy is sacked and Rob is forced to sell his share to Carla in return for her not going to the police. Peter's bookies begins to struggle financially. Carla is initially unaware of this, until Michelle tells her about Peter offering risky odds that could potentially bankrupt him. Peter accepts a large bet from Rob, including one that Peter cannot pay when Rob wins. This forces Peter to close his shop and allow Rob and Tracy to set up their own business. Carla gives Peter a share in the factory and he works in the office with her and Michelle, however, this angers Michelle, so she quits.

Carla accompanies Hayley to the hospital for a scan, where she is diagnosed with pancreatic cancer. Throughout Hayley's illness, she confides in Carla, who becomes protective of her. Carla and Anna Windass (Debbie Rush) find Hayley deceased on her bed with her husband, Roy Cropper (David Neilson). Carla then supports Roy as he grieves for Hayley, and is shocked to learn that Hayley committed suicide. Roy and Carla subsequently become good friends. Carla and Peter hire Tina McIntyre (Michelle Keegan) as a babysitter for Simon. Carla and Peter get married in December 2013, just as Rob discovers that Peter is having an affair with Tina. Tina tries to persuade Peter to leave Weatherfield with her. He agrees, although he feels conflicted, wanting to remain in Weatherfield with Carla. During an argument with Rob and Tracy in The Rovers, Carla announces that she is pregnant just as Tina arrives to collect Peter. Tina storms out, swiftly followed by Peter. They have an almighty argument, ending in Tina scratching Peter across his face. Peter leaves, as Rob visits Tina and attacks her, telling her not to tell Carla about her affair with Peter. Unknown to Rob, Peter tells Carla about the affair. Tina tries to escape Rob, leading to the balcony of the building yard. A scuffle ensues and as Rob pushes Tina; she loses her balance and falls from the balcony, plummeting onto the cobbles below. Rob thinks Tina is dead and leaves the flat, before hearing Tina's groans and realises she is still alive. When Tina reveals that she will lie to the police that Rob intentionally tried to kill her, Rob picks up a metal pipe and brutally beats Tina. Meanwhile, Carla is furious about Peter's affair and storms out into a busy pub, shouting that she wants to "kill" Tina. She is restrained by Michelle but eventually leaves the pub. Carla goes to Tina's flat and finds her seriously injured at the bottom of the balcony, and is seen by Leanne and Kal Nazir (Jimi Mistry), and soon finds herself prime suspect. She is arrested due to her fingerprints being on the weapon but later released without charge. At first, it is an assault investigation, but when Tina later dies from her injuries in hospital, it turns into a murder investigation. Carla confides in Roy repeatedly and slaps Peter when he tries to talk to her. Her stress finally catches up with her and she collapses in the street when Rob and Peter are fighting. She is rushed to the hospital, where she is told that she has suffered a miscarriage. Carla struggles to cope with her miscarriage and gets drunk to drown her sorrows. When Rob confesses to Tina's murder to Carla, she fights with him and ultimately chooses to tell the police; Rob is arrested and charged with Tina's murder. From this, Carla begins an intense feud with Tracy.

In January 2015, Carla and her staff are involved in a minibus crash while on their way to collect a fashion award. When the minibus crashes, Carla becomes wedged in between the driver's seat and the passenger seat. Tracy notices Carla is still trapped inside and climbs into the wreckage to retrieve her. Carla has a broken leg from the accident and thanks Tracy for saving her. After hearing that Liz McDonald (Beverley Callard) is selling her share of The Rovers, Carla offers to buy her half so that Michelle and Steve would still be able to live and work there. However, nobody is aware that Tracy and Liz's partner, Tony Stewart (Terence Maynard), whom Tracy is having an affair with, are attempting to con Liz, Steve and Michelle out of the pub so that they can buy it. On the day of Steve and Michelle's wedding day in May 2015, Liz confides in Carla, revealing that Tony and Tracy's affair, and that they were conning her out of The Rovers. Carla offers to look after Tracy's daughter and Liz's granddaughter, Amy (Elle Mulvaney) for the night, and confronts Tracy in the pub toilets, where Carla gives Tracy some harsh home truths. Later that night, Tracy steals the keys to Carla's flat at Victoria Court and lights a candle. She places the candle under a lampshade, and after spotting Carla asleep on the sofa, she contemplates killing her with a large ornament. After hearing Amy, Tracy quickly leaves, unaware that the lampshade has caught fire from the lit candle. When the fire is raging through the flat, Carla collapses from smoke inhalation and desperately tries to call Amy. Leanne breaks into the flat and pulls Carla out of the building. After she gets her breath back, Carla reveals that Amy is still trapped inside, so Leanne and Kal run back in to save her. Kal saves Leanne and Amy, before Carla and the other residents watch in horror as the building explodes, killing Kal. Factory worker Maddie Heath (Amy James-Kelly) is also caught up in the explosion and is also killed. As Carla was asleep when she started the fire, Tracy tells the residents that it was Carla who started the fire, leading to Leanne shouting at her in the street and everybody else hating her.

Carla plays a game of poker and wins a large amount of money. This subsequently leads to Carla developing an addiction to gambling, as it eases her guilt from the fire. Carla decides to go on holiday to Madrid. Carla returns a number of weeks later, and it is revealed that she actually went on holiday to Las Vegas in order to gamble. Michelle is furious and after trying to help her, Carla throws her out. Nick later accompanies Carla to a casino and is stunned to learn how serious her addiction is. Realising the extent of her financial troubles, Carla decides to move away and later tries selling the factory to Sally and Kal's daughter Alya Nazir (Sair Khan). However, before any contracts are signed, her old friend, Aidan, arrives. Carla decides to go into partnership with Aidan, while also starting a relationship with Nick. Carla becomes suspicious of Tracy, and when Tracy tells her not to keep blaming herself, Carla orders her to get in her car. To Tracy's surprise, Carla takes her to where the minibus crash occurred earlier in the year and expresses that she wishes Tracy had left her to die in the wreckage. She then flips a coin to decide her fate as she drunkenly stands on the edge of the quarry; heads she stands or tails she falls. It lands on tails, so as Carla prepares to throw herself from the cliff, Tracy screams that she was the culprit who started the fire. Carla refuses to believe her, but when Tracy tells her that she saw a photograph of Rob when she lit the candle, Carla realises that she is telling the truth. In pure anger, Carla grabs Tracy and drags her to the edge of the quarry, but Tracy pushes Carla over. Tracy pleads with Carla not to tell anybody, however, Carla is intent on phoning the police and opening an investigation to clear her name, but Tracy says she will deny everything. When Tracy tells Carla that her motive towards the fire was that she was jealous of her and that she still wishes Carla had died in the fire, Carla drives back to the street and the police arrest Tracy. However, Tracy is later released without charge.

Nick proposes to Carla and she is shocked to learn that Aidan used his father, Johnny's money to buy into the factory, and thus Johnny and Aidan's sister Kate move to Weatherfield and begin working there. While in prison, Rob begins sending Johnny visiting orders, and reveals that Johnny could potentially be Carla's father. Johnny steals some of Carla's DNA to perform a paternity test behind her back. This reveals that he is Carla's biological father, and decides to break the news to her. Carla is furious and slaps Johnny, and heads for a casino where she bumps into Robert Preston (Tristan Gemmill), and after gambling with him, they have sex. She instantly regrets it and confides in Michelle, who persuades Carla not to tell Nick. Carla is shocked to find that Robert plans to buy a share in the Bistro. Carla begs him to reconsider, but Robert threatens to reveal their one-night stand if she does not let him buy into the Bistro. Carla finds it increasingly difficult to keep her deceit a secret. Carla tells Nick that she cannot marry him, however after he persuades her, she changes her mind. Upon hearing that Robert is intending on going into business with Nick, Carla goes to the Bistro to confront him. As a power cut has forced the restaurant to close early, Carla and Robert engage in a bitter argument, with their one-night stand being mentioned. Unbeknown to the pair, but Tracy, who has recently reconciled with Robert, has overheard their conversation. Robert then leaves, and Carla drowns her sorrows in alcohol. However, Jamie Bowman (James Atherton), and his friend burst into the restaurant and violently attack Carla, pinning her down on the floor. Tracy, hearing the commotion, leaves Carla to the mercy of the thugs, feeling envious over Carla's liaison with Robert. After realising that there is no money in the restaurant, Jamie grabs Carla's handbag, causing her to fall over. She rises to her feet abruptly and gives chase, jumping into the van, leaving the door wide open, wrestling with the thugs for her handbag. As the van drives out of the street, Jamie pushes Carla out of the vehicle, knocking her unconscious.

Months later, Tracy begins blackmailing Carla, threatening to tell Nick about her and Robert if she does not persuade Nick to sell the Bistro to Robert and leave Weatherfield. Robert and Leanne both put in matching offers for the Bistro, so Tracy demands £10,000 from Carla. Carla convinces Nick to sell the Bistro to Robert; he does, but Tracy continues taunting Carla. Closer to the wedding, Robert finds out what Tracy has been doing to Carla but they stay together. Nick and Carla break up when he feels guilty after throwing a mug at Carla, causing her to cut her face. They get back together when she supports him. On the wedding day, Tracy tries to ruin proceedings by sending the flowers to the wrong address. Carla feels guilty, so she tells Nick about the one-night stand with Robert; he manages to forgive her. Tracy then announces that she has been blackmailing Carla, which Nick finds more difficult to accept. They eventually marry but Nick instantly regrets it, leaving the venue and Carla in tears. Carla asks Roy to get his car so that she can flee Weatherfield. However, she instead gets in her own car. In front of her, Tracy taunts her and Carla speeds up her car to run Tracy over. Tracy moves but a truck drove by Tyrone Dobbs (Alan Halsall) and his girlfriend Fiz Stape (Jennie McAlpine) comes into her path and she swerves, knocking over Roy's partner, Cathy Matthews (Melanie Hill) before crashing into the postbox. Carla escapes unharmed, but Cathy lies on the ground motionless. Tyrone crashes into the Platt household, but he and Fiz also escape unharmed, with the help from Nick's half-brother David Platt (Jack P. Shepherd). Roy goes with Cathy to the hospital and as he is Carla, who is being held back by police, tries to apologise for what she has done. The next day, Carla decides to leave for Devon even though the car crashes are pending investigation. Before leaving, she visits the hospital to see Cathy. Cathy forgives her but Roy finds it more difficult to. She tells Roy she is leaving, but Cathy insists that he reconciles with Carla, however, he declares, "Carla is who she is, and will never change". Carla then says an emotional farewell to Johnny, Michelle, Aidan, and Kate. Tracy walks out of her florists and Carla declares, "We're done". She then gets in Johnny's car to depart. However, a bus comes and Roy dashes over. Johnny stops the car, with Roy and Carla sharing a final farewell. He forgives her for running over Cathy but tells her she should try to love herself. Carla then kisses Roy on the cheek before getting back in the car and leaving Weatherfield for a new life in Devon.

Over a year later, Carla meets Aidan in a pub after he calls for her help in saving Underworld. However, she refuses and leaves, stating that she has a new life now. She returns on Christmas Day, with a great response from her family and Michelle. Carla refuses to drink during the day which is picked up upon numerous times. While visiting she says that she will become a partner in Underworld with Aidan. She later bumps into Tracy who calls her a goblin to which Carla replies, "just think of me as a Ghost of Christmas Past". It is declared that she must be up to something when she is seen pouring a drink down the sink in the bathroom as everyone in the pub is singing. Carla invites Roy to join her and the family for New Year's Eve in the Rover's Return. Roy wants Carla to tell her family about her kidney failure—she has only shared with him her need for a kidney transplant. Roy has agreed to keep quiet about her condition but says she needs support and must tell them. Carla struggles with her illness and as everyone welcomes in the New Year, she breaks down; Roy witnesses this and asks her to move in with him. She agrees and goes back inside while Roy searches online "how to donate a kidney", unbeknownst to Carla. Carla also grows close to Daniel Osbourne (Rob Mallard), Peter and Tracy's half-brother, upon her return. She clashes with Peter's new partner, Toyah Battersby (Georgia Taylor), who sees her as a threat. Carla, however, refuses to tell her family about her illness, despite numerous advice from Roy. She later collapses in the street and is found by Brian Packham (Peter Gunn) and is rushed to the hospital. At the hospital, Roy tells her that he was tested for a kidney match but was not successful, which touched Carla. She decides to listen to him and upon hearing that her situation is getting more critical, she tells Kate and Aidan who both tell her that they will get tested.

On the day that Aidan and Kate get tested, Carla meets Daniel and they go round to his flat. After they establish a certain spark between them both, they have sex. Afterwards, they leave the flat and kiss on the doorstep which Daniel's ex-girlfriend, Sinead Tinker (Katie McGlynn) witnesses whilst going round to get back with Daniel as he had earlier given her a present. They later meet up for a drink in the Rovers Return, which Peter is now landlord of with Toyah. Peter tells Carla that he saw them together earlier and it is obvious that Peter is jealous. Whilst there, she meets Aidan who tells her that he has been tested. Peter also talks with Daniel and pesters about what was going on that afternoon. However, Sinead's aunt Beth Sutherland (Lisa George) storms into the pub and argues with Carla about their kiss on the doorstep which everybody hears including Peter who sarcastically comments – "you make a great couple". The next day, Peter taunts Carla about Daniel suggesting that she is only doing it to get back at him. Carla disagrees by saying, "don’t flatter yourself" and says sarcastically that Toyah is lucky, clearly because he is jealous of Carla. She later meets Daniel again and they go on a date where she orders a bottle of wine – her first alcoholic drink in a while. Aidan and Kate disapprove but she goes ahead and drinks anyway before collapsing which is met by an audience of Tracy who also teases her about Daniel. Carla and Daniel later meet again in the Rovers as both Aidan and Kate find out they are donor matches. After being refused a drink by Peter and Toyah after stumbling to the bar, Carla collapses again as Roy reveals that she has kidney failure to all her family, Peter, Daniel, and Toyah. Peter worries about her as she is taken to hospital with disapproval from Toyah. Tracey later finds out and is taken aback as she too has had kidney failure. At the hospital, Aidan agrees to donate his kidney as Carla’s situation becomes even more critical with the doctors saying that she needs a new kidney quick. Aidan is praised by the rest of the family and Carla who thanks him. The next day, Peter visits her in the hospital and brings her a book where Daniel already is. Once again, Peter shows jealousy but he and Carla appear to get on with Peter saying that he still cares.

After realising that she might die, Carla tells Sinead that Daniel still likes her and that she doesn’t want her last moments to be stealing somebody else’s man. Aidan later has his operation and Carla has a kidney transplant – which are both successful. Afterward, Carla tells Roy that she is renting out her house in Devon and moving back to Weatherfield for good, much to his delight. Carla later sleeps with Michelle's biological son Ali Neeson (James Burrows) who was swapped at birth and won’t speak to his mother, after Carla tries to make amends between them. She hides this from Michelle. Carla later gives Aidan 100% of Underworld on his birthday, to which he responds nervously, which leads to Johnny suspecting that he is hiding something. Carla later discovers that Robert, who is now engaged to Michelle, is using steroids. She agrees to not tell Michelle but confides in Ali about it as he is a GP. After asking how Ali is dealing with the situation, Ali tries to kiss Carla and although she refuses at first, they share a more passionate kiss as Michelle walks out on them both. Michelle is extremely angry at Carla and they fall out. Carla then tells Ali that her friendship with Michelle will come first and won’t let him stay the night at Roy’s.

Carla is left distraught when Aidan commits suicide but manages to stay strong and support her family. The day after his death, she reopens the factory which shocks the employees as it is so soon after his death. She continues to run it until Michelle finds Aidan's will, which reveals he has left it to Alya Nazir, whom Carla doesn’t get on with and would hate for her to own the factory. Michelle and Carla seek legal advice as the will was written before Carla gave 100% of the factory to Aidan and keep it a secret from Alya. In the coming weeks, tension arises between Alya and Carla. She is told that she will have to say that Aidan was mentally unstable when he wrote his will and she later lashes out at Alya causing her to quit her job at Underworld before Carla breaks down and locks herself in her office. She tells Michelle that she feels responsible for Aidan’s suicide as she put pressure on him when giving him the factory. Unknown to Carla, Alya is later given Aidan’s will which shows that she is the sole owner of Underworld. Alya and her lawyer Imran Habeeb (Charlie De Melo) tell the Connors that she knows and Johnny finds out about Aidan’s will, telling Carla that he will disown her if she contests it. On the day of Aidan’s funeral, Carla contemplates drinking. Before the service, Alya appears and Carla threatens her. Carla is later furious when Alya changes Underworld’s locks on the same day and storms over to Alya. After calming down, Carla tells her that she can have the 18% as it is what she would’ve had anyway. Despite this, Alya refuses and Carla tells her that she’ll see her in court.

Carla later asks Beth to get inside information about Underworld in exchange for a rent-free flat. She also gets Peter involved and they go on several dates. He helps the Connor family as they fight Eva Price (Catherine Tyldesley) for custody of Susie Price, as he previously believed this was his child. On the day before the mediation, he brings around a birth certificate to prove Eva lied about her parents. Carla is, however, sceptical about showing this as it would get Eva into a lot of trouble. Johnny later kidnaps Susie and Carla supports him. She shouts at Eva in the street when Johnny is arrested. Johnny is, however, later released, and the Connors forgive Eva when she leaves. A week later, Peter tells Carla that he thinks there’s still a flame between them but she shouts at him and tells him that he’s stupid. Alya later tells Carla that she is selling the factory in order to fund her family's restaurant. Initially, it is for 18% less than the price, but Alya later puts it up. Alya also gives Carla a video of Aidan doing an interview about being a kidney donor. Carla struggles with finding money for the factory but Peter rescues her by becoming her partner. Carla later breaks down over Aidan's death, saying that she blames herself but Johnny reassures her and later on Carla and Peter meet and end up kissing. The next day, they talk about the kiss and both say it didn’t mean anything, although the factory girls and her family are sceptical about Peter’s motive for helping Carla. Peter later tells Carla that he doesn’t want to be a sleeping partner and that he is to work full time at the factory, shocking her. A few weeks later, Carla and Peter interview new staff for the factory and Carla brings in someone who looks like Tina, to catch Peter out. However, he realises and she is shocked that he doesn’t want to employ her. This makes Carla realise that she might actually have feelings for him as he appears to have changed. The next day, after trying to protect Simon from a gang, she witnesses Peter shot and fears that he has died. Luckily, it was only a paint gun but she realises she has feelings for him and confesses to Michelle and is met with a cold response. A few months later, Nick returns and Carla’s feelings for Peter grow stronger. However, she finds out that he is planning to sell his share of the factory although manages to stall him. Unknown to her, Peter finds an application to buy his share from a while back, addressed to Carla and sells his share to Nick, shocking Carla when she is about to tell him about her feelings. At first, they struggle to work together but manage as Nick tells a lie to Carla about what he has been up to. Carla, however, knows it’s a lie and after doing some digging finds out that he has a wife, who spots her rummaging through his car. She later confronts her and they talk about Nick. Carla later meets with Nick and blackmails him, telling him that he either sells his share over to her or she tells his wife, Elsa (Kelly Harrison) and Leanne, who is now seeing, about the marriage and his relationship.

On New Year's Eve 2018, Carla shares a game of snooker with Peter and they share a heart to heart, with them both confessing their love with each other. Carla is later upset when she sees Abi Franklin (Sally Carman) and Peter together, which he notices. Later on, he asks her about this as he can see her jealousy, although Carla rejects him when he tries to kiss her. Carla later comforts Peter when the boat sets on fire and Simon is trapped on board. Unknown to both Carla and Peter, Roy accidentally set the boat alight whilst sleepwalking, something which Carla is helping him cope with. Peter blames Abi as he broke up with her earlier in the day. She later finds out that it was Roy because of CCTV footage in the factory, although she lets Abi take the blame and destroys all evidence that Roy started it without telling him. However, Abi is later given an alibi and everyone starts to accuse Carla of starting it, including Peter, out of jealousy. Roy, however, later finds his clothes and Carla is forced to tell him the truth. He is devastated and tells Peter, who agrees to not pursue the matter further. Roy insists on going to the police but argues furiously with Carla telling her that she didn’t cover up the fire to protect him and instead did it out of jealousy, wanting Abi locked up as she is still in love with Peter, leaving Carla in tears. The following day, Roy tells Carla that she should find somewhere else to live. A week later, Carla ignores the fact the roof of the factory needs replacing and tells Gary Windass (Mikey North) that she can’t afford it. She instead focuses on starting a new business contract where workers and material would be supplied from abroad. Carla is later threatened by Robert, following his breakup with Michelle, as he is looking for someone to blame. Nick later finds out about her plans for outsourcing and Carla admits to her employees that she is planning to move production to Milton Keynes which they take badly. They go on strike and Nick swears revenge on Carla as he needs money. Peter tries to help but she tells him to back off and Gary also pesters her for repair money. She later sees that her car window has been smashed, to which Robert tells her it could be anyone as she now has a lot of enemies.

The next day, Kate is due to marry Rana Habeeb (Bhavna Limbachia) but Carla finds out that Peter is leaving and manages to track him down. She breaks down in front of him and tells him she loves him and wants them to be together, but he tells her that although he loves her, she will "kill him" and he leaves anyway, leaving Carla distraught. Unknown to her, the workers have broken into Underworld in a protest. However, the factory roof collapses, leaving residents such as Sally, Rana, Sean, Kirk Sutherland (Andrew Whyment), Paul Foreman (Peter Ash), Gemma Winter (Dolly-Rose Campbell) and Emma Brooker (Alexandra Mardell) unconscious and injured. Carla later drowns her sorrows in a pub, but realises she should be at Kate's wedding. However, upon arriving on the street she finds out about the collapse and that Rana is trapped inside after going to fetch her bag. Peter arrives to comfort Carla as he finds out about the collapse and Carla breaks down to him, insisting it was her fault, as they find out that Rana has died in the incident. Carla initially wants to tell the police the truth as they want to interview her but Peter bribes Gary with £10,000 to keep quiet and they say that neither of them knew that the roof needed repairing. Carla is suspicious of the health and safety inspector and Roy's previous foster son Wayne Hayes (Adam Barlow) and leaves for a short break with Peter after he says he loves her and will be there. A week later the pair return and Carla is arrested at Rana's memorial for manslaughter and the residents start to blame her for Rana's death, including Kate. Upon being released from police custody, Carla visits Aidan’s grave where she is verbally attacked and starts receiving text messages from an anonymous person pretending to be Rana telling her the roof collapse was "her fault". Later on Carla rings the phone number believing it to actually be Rana and that she is still alive, showing that her mental health is deteriorating. She later finds out that it is Alya sending the messages as Kate tells her, although she starts believing everybody is plotting against her and starts hearing voices. The next day, she starts feeling trapped and Ken Barlow (William Roache) tries to help, aware of her paranoia. She runs outside barefoot and bumps into the police and Alya, who she believes has been sent to spy on her. Peter manages to find her and takes her to the medical centre where Carla tries to find Rana, whom she believes is still alive. Toyah attempts to help her but she escapes through the window when Toyah leaves to try and get professional mental health support.

Peter begins to look for her and manages to get Johnny to help him. He reports her missing to the police but refuses to believe they will help and possibly arrest her when she is found. He posts an image of her online and gets a reply from a man at a squat on her old estate, which he follows up and comes to nothing. The police later tell him that she was seen drawing money out of a cash machine and returning to the squat. He goes back with Johnny and threatens the man, who makes it clear that she isn’t there. Peter and Johnny leave as Carla watches from the window. She is told to find somewhere else to go as Peter causes trouble. She acknowledges this as not being safe "from Peter". Robert later finds Carla in a hotel in town when the staff shout "Mrs. Donovan" and she panics upon seeing him. However, he later catches up with her and tries to calm her down saying he is there for her and attempts to bring her back to the street. Upon returning, she runs away as Robert tries to find her, he is stalled by a man who punches him, thinking Carla is threatened. Robert later tells the family and they run into the street shouting her, as she hides behind a wall. Throughout the search, they find that Carla has been living in a hotel room, which she has ultimately destroyed. They also find she hasn’t been taking medication for her kidney failure and may go into rejection. As the police start taking their search for her more serious, Carla panics and goes to Roy, whom she believes she can trust. However, when he rings her family to notify them that he has found her, she lashes out at Roy. An ambulance arrives as Carla breaks down. The doctor tells Roy and Johnny that her kidneys are fine but she demands to see Peter, who unknown to her, has been in rehab after a relapse. Peter visits and comforts her as she is psychologically assessed and is told she is to be discharged the following day but will need to be assessed every day and Roy lets her and Peter stay with him. Carla's condition worsens and she floods Roy's flat before stealing everyone's phones. Carla later hallucinates and thinks she sees Hayley and Rana before thinking Peter is Aidan. Peter saves her from jumping from the fire escape and she is sectioned before she is sent to a mental health facility in Carlisle where Peter stays with her.

A few months later, a seemingly better Carla and Peter return to Weatherfield. She insists she is recovering but Peter keeps worrying about her. Carla announces that she’s giving her share of Underworld to each of the employees and she gets a job at Viaduct Bistro. She later quits when she finds out the employees have been in a group chat that Peter has set up, wanting to check up on her. She also kicks Peter out of Roy’s but they later reconcile. They both later manage The Rovers Return for a while whilst Johnny and Jenny go away. In April 2021, Carla and Peter got remarried. In March 2023, Carla got sent away for mental health treatment after work colleague Stephen Reid (Todd Boyce) poisoned her at work. Carla later returns to Weatherfield to provide support for her adoptive nephew Ryan Connor (Ryan Prescott) after he is badly scarred whilst protecting Daisy Midgeley (Charlotte Jordan) from an acid attack by her stalker Justin Rutherford (Andrew Still). After Peter divorces Carla begins a same-sex relationship with Lisa Swain (Vicky Myers).

== Reception ==
=== Critical response ===
Columnist Grace Dent has described Carla as "...an alluring vision, raven haired, classy, sultry and replete with guile". The episode aired on 3 December 2008, in which Carla married Tony Gordon attracted an impressive peak of 10.5 million viewers.

In January 2009, the character was heralded as the new Elsie Tanner: "strong, dark, mouthy, pushy, full of herself and nobody's fool, ready to put the world to rights with another lashing of lipstick. Has Coronation Street finally found the new Elsie Tanner in Carla Gordon I'm starting to think that perhaps they might have". The return of the character on 19 October 2009, after an eight-month absence, drew large ratings for the show's episodes which were watched by 9.88m (42.2%) and 10.24m (40.5%) respectively. In 2010, Dan Martin from The Guardian wrote that he would probably still watch the soap if the producers got "rid of everyone apart from Carla".

Radio Times soaps columnist David Brown gave mixed comments in his response to Carla's rape storyline. He made the point that while it was being treated with more sensitivity than the rape of Toyah Battersby (Georgia Taylor) in 2001, the impression was that the writing team were placing too much pain and anguish upon Carla's character: "By having Carla undergo a vicious violation like rape, it begins to feel that she's being systematically targeted by the storyliners. There's no denying that the scenes in this evening's double bill are powerfully acted by Alison King, but there seems to be an underlying mission to crack open Carla's carapace and expose her vulnerability. In the wider world, rapists often choose their targets regardless of the victim's circumstance, so there's no saying that Carla wouldn’t suffer an assault of this sort. But, in a fictional setting, it does begin to look cruel when so much anguish is piled onto one person's shoulders."

Sarah Ellis of Inside Soap said that Carla was great to watch when she is with Peter. She added that they are "like a car crash waiting to happen". Her colleague, Laura-Jayne Tyler, called Carla's departure "thoroughly disappointing", commenting, "For a character who has given Corrie [sic] 10 years of top drama, we don't think Carla deserved to be 'slut shamed' out of Weatherfield." A reporter writing for the Inside Soap Yearbook 2017 described Carla as a "soap favourite" and hoped she would "hurry home soon". Another reporter later named Carla and Tracy's feud as one of the "best bits of February", describing the pair as "sworn enemies". They described Tracy confronting Carla as "the big moment" in the episodes.

=== Accolades ===
In an online poll conducted by MSN Entertainment, Carla Connor was voted as 'Soapland's Sexiest Female of 2008', with more than 31% of votes. At the 2008 Inside Soap Awards, the character was voted "Best Bitch". King was awarded "Best Actress" at The British Soap Awards 2012. On Digital Spy's 2012 end of year reader poll, King was nominated for "Best Female Soap Actor" and came fifth with 9.7% of the vote. King was nominated for the "Best Actress" award at The British Soap Awards 2014, and was nominated for the award again in the 2015 ceremony. She was nominated for "Best Actress" again at The British Soap Awards 2019.
