= Frank Foster (Coronation Street) =

Fictional character in British soap opera

- Coronation Street character
- Portrayed by: Andrew Lancel
- Duration: 2011–2012
- First appearance: 20 January 2011
- Last appearance: 8 March 2012
- Introduced by: Phil Collinson
In-universe information
- Occupation: Businessman
- Father: Sam Foster
- Mother: Anne Foster

Frank Foster is a fictional character from the British ITV soap opera Coronation Street, played by Andrew Lancel. He made his debut appearance on 20 January 2011. Frank was introduced as a business associate of Carla Connor (Alison King). In December 2011, it was announced Frank would be leaving Coronation Street at the end of his storyline. Two months later, it was confirmed Frank would be murdered as part of a "whodunit" storyline. Five regular characters became suspects during the investigation, but his mother, Anne Foster (Gwen Taylor) eventually confessed to killing him. Frank made his last on-screen appearance on 8 March 2012.

== Development ==
=== Casting ===
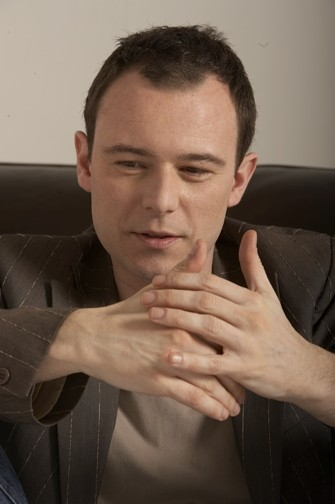
Andrew Lancel (pictured) was cast to play Frank, which he did for thirteen months.

On 23 November 2010, it was announced actor Andrew Lancel had joined the cast of Coronation Street as businessman, Frank Foster. A writer for itv.com said Frank is a business associate of Carla Connor (Alison King), who eventually becomes a factory client. Of his casting, Lancel said "I'm made up to be here. It's been a long time coming and I'm a big fan of the show so I'm thrilled. Frank looks like he's going to be fun to play, there's more to him than meets the eye, he's definitely not one-sided." Lancel revealed he was an extra on Coronation Street when he was a teenager and had always watched the show, so when he was asked to join the show he could not resist it. Lancel made his on screen debut as Frank in January 2011.

=== Rape storylines ===
The storyline which saw Frank sexually assaulting Maria Connor (Samia Longchambon) was originally intended for the character of Michelle Connor (Kym Marsh). But when Marsh took an early maternity leave, the story was hastily re-written for Maria instead. Lancel admitted that filming the sexual assault scene was "uncomfortable", but hoped that Frank would become "one of the villains people love to hate". He described the character as "charismatic, charming and you’re never quite sure what he'll do next." He added "Don't mess with Frank. He doesn't worry about using force of a different kind to keep [Maria] quiet. He turns things around and says he could take her to court over what she is saying. That takes some ego. I'm not trying to justify what he did... He's a bad man. [...] Underworld is run by two beautiful women and he's got power over them as they aren't doing that well... he enjoys the power he now has over her from a business point of view." In August 2011, it was announced Frank's parents, Anne (Gwen Taylor) and Sam Foster (Paul Clayton), would be arriving in September.

In June 2011, it was announced that Carla will reportedly be left fighting for her life after being attacked by her boyfriend. The factory owner will be subjected to a physical and sexual assault by Frank Foster after he suspects she is cheating on him with Peter Barlow (Chris Gascoyne). Carla will consider leaving Frank prior to the attack, but feels she owes him after he invested in her business and takes the blame for a car accident she is responsible for. The plot was a prominent storyline over the summer and aired after the 9pm watershed during a week of special episodes. Tracy Barlow (Kate Ford) will offer to give Frank a positive character reference in court, while Peter's marriage to Leanne suffers.

=== Departure and death ===
On 17 January 2012, Lancel revealed there would be "lots more to come" from Frank before his departure from the show. The actor said he had not finished filming yet and that he would be around for a little while to come. He explained "People are asking me all the time, 'Are you leaving?' It doesn't feel like I'm leaving, because I've always known the whole thing. I read the other day that it's coming to a conclusion, and I think that's a really good way of putting it." Lancel added that he had liked playing Frank. Daniel Kilkelly reported Lancel had finished filming with Coronation Street in early February. He made his final on screen appearance as Frank on 8 March 2012.

On 3 February 2012, Coronation Street confirmed Frank would be killed off as part of a whodunit storyline. The news came shortly after the episode showing Frank being found not guilty of raping Carla was broadcast. A writer for the official Coronation Street website said "Now events will take an even more dramatic turn as tensions rise and vengeance will be on the minds of several characters, climaxing in Frank's death! And with so many residents having a motive for killing the twisted factory boss – the list of suspects reads like a 'Who's Who' of Weatherfield." Over the following weeks, Frank manages to alienate himself as he tries to get revenge on Carla for dragging him through court. Lancel said Frank's true colours would be exposed and he does not think his life is in danger for a moment. His body will be found in the factory, following "days of arguments and confrontations with associates, lovers and enemies alike." A reporter for the Metro later announced that five regular characters would become suspects during the investigation into Frank's murder. Frank will be found dead on the floor of the Underworld factory by Sally Webster (Sally Dynevor). The Metro reporter said Sally comes under suspicion when she is found standing over Frank's body with bloodied hands. Carla, Peter and Michelle are questioned by the police, while Sally's ex-husband, Kevin (Michael Le Vell), will also fall under suspicion. Lancel praised his character's final storyline, calling it "classic Corrie".

While appearing on BBC Breakfast, Lancel said Frank had made a lot of enemies on the Street for a number of reasons. The actor explained "He's been monstrous, horrendous. People know what he's done - he's assaulted and twisted the knife into many people, and he's closed down the factory, so there's plenty of people who could be bumping off Frank and there are many suspects." Lancel believed the five regular characters named as suspects were all potential killers and he was looking forward to watching the mystery unfold on screen. He added that the way Frank's final scenes were shot, viewers would not see the killer. Carla later emerged as the bookies' top suspect with odds of 2/1. Rupert Adams, a spokesman for William Hill said Carla has her reasons to kill Frank and that the dark horse is Kirk Sutherland (Andrew Whyment).

== Storylines ==
Frank comes to Underworld to do a deal with Carla Connor (Alison King) and he takes an interest in her assistant, Michelle Connor (Kym Marsh). Carla tells Michelle that they need to impress Frank, so she goes out for a meal with him to discuss business arrangements, much to the anger of her boyfriend, Ciaran McCarthy (Keith Duffy). Frank later returns to do a business deal with Carla and meets Maria Connor (Samia Smith), Michelle's replacement. Carla tells Maria to go to his house to finalise a business deal and Frank cooks dinner for them, and tells Maria that he is willing to seal the deal. Whilst they sit and have a drink on his sofa, Frank tells Maria that he is attracted to her and tries to force himself on her. A distraught Maria escapes and later tells Carla about Frank's attack. Tracy Barlow (Kate Ford) arranges a date with Frank but he stands her up when he has some business to deal with. Maria warns Tracy about Frank assaulting her but Tracy refuses to listen and tells Frank about Maria's accusation. Frank then cancels the deal with Underworld, much to Carla's anguish as the factory was relying on his business. However, a smitten Tracy continues dating him and Carla persuades him to do business, much to Maria's indignation. Tracy tires of Frank and deliberately keeps mentioning her ex-boyfriend Steve McDonald (Simon Gregson) whilst on a date. Frank is not impressed and ends their relationship.

Frank later offers to buy a share in Underworld, which Carla happily accepts. Everyone at the factory celebrates the factory's new victory, but Maria quits her job, and tells her boyfriend Chris Gray (Will Thorp) about what happened with Frank; Chris threatens Frank. Maria reluctantly reports Frank to the police, after a heated encounter with Carla. The police arrest Frank, but he is soon released due to a lack of evidence. A few months later when Carla is informed of the death of her mother, Frank comforts her, and after she gets heavily drunk at the Bistro and later the Rover's Return, Frank is told by Peter Barlow (Chris Gascoyne) to look after her. He takes Carla home, and lets her sleep on the couch. When they arrive for work the next morning together, gossip begins to spread, and Maria becomes convinced they are a couple. Chris confronts Frank in the Rovers, leading to a pub brawl. Some time later, Carla goes to stay at Frank's and they kiss, thus beginning a relationship.

Frank proposes to Carla in the Rovers. After originally rejecting his offer, a confrontation with Peter, whom she really loves, causes her to change her mind, and later that day she tells Frank that she will marry him. In the weeks that follow, Frank begins planning their future together as husband and wife, even mentioning the prospect of children and making an offer on a plush suburban house he has chosen for them. The offer is rejected, to Carla's secret relief. It soon becomes apparent that Carla does not really want to marry Frank and she comes under increasing pressure after meeting his parents, Sam (Paul Clayton) and Anne Foster (Gwen Taylor), to celebrate the engagement. She gets drunk during a meal with Frank's parents and jumps into Frank's car. Frank tries to stop her driving but she ignores his pleas and accidentally runs over Stella Price (Michelle Collins) before crashing into Barlow's Bookies. In order to save his fiancée, a quick-thinking Frank places an unconscious Carla in the passenger seat to make it appear that he was driving. When questioned by police, he tells them that he was responsible and is lucky to escape the charges with just points on his driving licence and a fine.

Carla eventually tells Frank the truth about her not wanting to go through with the wedding. However, Frank becomes aggressive, pinning her against the wall and hitting her twice. He eventually rapes her, claiming that she made him the person he is. Carla phones Maria, and together they report Frank's sexual assault to the police. Frank is arrested for rape but released on bail while the police hunt for evidence. To anger Carla, Frank persuades his mother to begin working at Underworld, as he is not allowed anywhere near Carla. Anne attempts to discredit Carla, disbelieving the claims against her son. Frank opens his own rival factory and persuades some of Carla's staff to join him. One of these is Sally Webster (Sally Dynevor), with whom he soon begins an affair. Frank is devastated when his father suddenly dies of a heart attack. He hires a private investigator to follow Carla and Peter and she gives him pictures of them kissing. He and his mother then expose their relationship. Frank is found not guilty of raping Carla and he walks away free.

Frank returns to work at the factory alongside Carla. He begins seeing Jenny Sumner (Niky Wardley) and they concoct a plan to buy Carla out of the factory for a low price and sack the entire workforce. Sally learns of Frank and Jenny's relationship and realises he did rape Carla. She tells Michelle, but they arrive at the factory shortly after Carla signs the factory over to Frank, who gloats about his plan. Peter tries to attack him, but is held back. Frank then throws his mother out of the factory and his home. Carla comes to confront Frank and she makes him admit that he raped her. Sean Tully (Antony Cotton) and Julie Carp (Katy Cavanagh) later find Sally with Frank's dead body on the floor of the factory. On the day of Frank's funeral, Anne confesses to Sally that she killed her son. Anne later explains that she overheard him taunting Carla about the rape and blamed him for husband Sam's death. She went to the factory to get her late husband's watch back, but when Frank resisted and pushed her away, Anne picked up a whisky bottle and hit him.

== Reception ==
Frank was nominated for Best Baddy at 2012 Virgin Media TV Awards. He received 1.39% of the vote. Lancel earned a nomination for Best Villain at the All About Soap Awards and he won Villain of the Year at the British Soap Awards. Jon Wise of The People called Frank an "evil bully". The scenes showing Sally discovering Frank's true colours topped the ratings on 2 March 2012 with 9.19 million people tuning in. Sally Dynevor said that Lancel should win "Best Villain" at the soap awards and praised Lancel for his portrayal of Frank. Dynevor added that Frank is part of a "great storyline" and that he is such a great character.

== See also ==
- List of Coronation Street characters (2011)
- List of soap opera villains
