= Trevor Dean =

Fictional character from Coronation Street

- Coronation Street character
- Portrayed by: Steve Jackson
- Duration: 2010–2011
- First appearance: 28 January 2010
- Last appearance: 25 March 2011
- Introduced by: Kim Crowther (2010); Phil Collinson (2011)
In-universe information
- Occupation: Binman; Factory manager
- Wife: Michaela Cross (backstory)

Trevor Dean is a fictional character from the British ITV soap opera Coronation Street, played by Steve Jackson. He first appears during the episode airing on 28 January 2010 as a lodger for Janice Battersby (Vicky Entwistle).

He lodged with Janice at 14a Victoria Street from February to October 2010. He dated Carla Connor (Alison King), who gave him a managerial job at her lingerie factory Underworld but he quit and left the area when the arrangement didn't work out. He returned in March 2011, and later left with Janice to go travelling.

== Creation and development ==
The character of Trevor is introduced in early 2010 as a bin-man and lodger for Janice Battersby (Vicky Entwistle). Trevor forms a mis-matched relationship with Carla Connor (Alison King) and also plans a trip to the World Cup. On 6 May 2010 it was reported that the character of Trevor would be axed and the actor's contract terminated. The character left on 4 October 2010. Trevor returned briefly in March 2011 to enable the departure of Janice.

== Storylines ==
In January 2010, whilst working, Trevor refuses to empty Janice Battersby's (Vicky Entwistle) wheelie bin as the lid is not down. Janice is annoyed but is smitten with Trevor when he responds to her advertisement for a lodger, needing somewhere to live after splitting up with his ex-girlfriend. Trevor enjoys living with Janice but does not realise that she is attracted to him. When he takes in two stray cats, Janice puts up with them despite being allergic. In February, Trevor is looking for Janice and finds her boss, Carla Connor (Alison King), cleaning so he thinks she is the cleaner. When he later sees her at The Rovers, they exchange numbers and agree to a date until Trevor sees Underworld's real cleaner, Teresa Bryant (Karen Henthorn), and Carla getting out of her expensive car. Rather than being angry at Carla's deception, Trevor is bemused, and he and Carla go on to have an enjoyable first date. From then on, their romance blossoms.

In May 2010, Trevor tries to organise a World Cup trip for Steve McDonald (Simon Gregson), Ashley Peacock (Steven Arnold), Peter Barlow (Chris Gascoyne) and Tyrone Dobbs (Alan Halsall), on the condition that they keep it from their wives and girlfriends. On 14 May, Janice finds a suitcase full of cash under Trevor's bed and asks him what it is, worried he earned it illegally, so Trevor reveals that it is his savings for the World Cup and Janice agrees to keep quiet, providing she can come too. Trevor also tries to negotiate a business deal for Carla in the Rovers Return when a businessman thinks he is Carla's business partner. Trevor hears that Carla's ex-husband Tony Gordon (Gray O'Brien) has escaped from prison and seeks to use this as a reason to stay with Carla. After the siege at the factory, Trevor helps Carla recover and asks her to go to the World Cup with him. She accepts and they spend two weeks in South Africa. They return in July 2010 and Carla offers Trevor a trainee manager's position at Underworld. He accepts but this annoys her business partner and shareholder Nick Tilsley (Ben Price) who considers Trevor incompetent. Trevor is unhappy and after making a number of costly mistakes, his relationship with Carla is strained. The final straw comes when Nick insults him and Trevor punches him in front of everyone at the factory and has a blasing row with Carla, who admits that their relationship is no longer working. He tells Carla that she has never got over the death of her former lover and brother-in-law Liam Connor (Rob James-Collier) and that he cannot live in the shadow of a dead man. Later that night in the Rovers' smoking shelter, Trevor recounts the events of his day to Lloyd Mullaney (Craig Charles) who convinces him to get in touch with his ex-girlfriend, Michaela, and look to the future. With Lloyd's advice in mind, Trevor comes to realise that there is nothing left for him in Weatherfield. He decides to go to Swansea and attempt a reconciliation with Michaela. As he moves his belongings out of Carla's apartment, he warns her to be vigilant about her drinking. Trevor then comforts her about their broken relationship and wishes her well and leaves.

In March 2011, Janice informs Eileen Grimshaw (Sue Cleaver) and Sean Tully (Antony Cotton) that she thought she saw Trevor and tells Carla but Carla insists that she was seeing things. A few days later, Janice bumps into Trevor in Roy's Rolls, he tells her he has been in the area for the past month. He later spots Janice in the rain and he asks her to go for a drink with him. She agrees and they go to The Rovers. The next day, he asks Janice to leave with him and she agrees after saying goodbye to stepdaughter Leanne (Jane Danson). Izzy Armstrong (Cherylee Houston) sees them about to leave and tells everyone in the pub, so Trevor deliberately drives through a puddle, soaking them, with Janice shouting "Losers" as they drive off into the distance together.

== Reception ==
In 2010, Dan Martin from The Guardian speculated that "Trev the binman" could be one of the characters to be killed-off in the soap's 50th anniversary special, as he believed that the "primary function of a big soap disaster is to sweep out the dead wood", and that Trevor was one of the "characters we don't care about even if we noticed they were there".
