= South Charnwood High School =

Location
- Broad Lane; Markfield, Leicestershire, LE67 9TB; England; 52.67941°N 1.30329°W

Information
- Type: Academy
- Established: 1934
- Department for Education URN: 139442 Tables
- Ofsted: Reports
- Headteacher: Simon Andrews
- Gender: Mixed
- Age: 11 to 16
- Enrolment: 865
- Colours: Green, Yellow and Black
- Website: http://www.southcharnwood.leics.sch.uk/

South Charnwood High School is a mixed secondary school located between the villages of Markfield and Thornton in the Hinckley and Bosworth district of Leicestershire. The school was established in 1935 thus various additions to the school have been made since. The current headmaster is Mr Simon Andrews.

In 1975, the school began enrolling pupils at the school one year prior than the usual transfer system. Pupils transfer from locations situated in the catchment area, such as; Markfield, Thornton Many pupils are also from Bagworth, Stanton-under-Bardon, and Leicester Forest East. However, the school admits youngsters from areas outside catchment. Students used to leave when aged 14, and usually transferred to Bosworth Academy or Groby Community College.

An inspection early in 2005 described the school to be good as of gathering the idea that the school has high standards and achievement, as well as student support. In 2010, the school was rated 'outstanding' overall by Ofsted.

From September 2014, the school changed to become an 11-16 secondary school.

The headteacher preceding Andrews was Andrew Morris. Morris' predecessor, James Etchingha,m is the father of ITV News at Ten newsreader Julie Etchingham

== Notable former pupils ==
- Alison King, actress
