= Urban Gothic (TV series) =

Television series

- Title screen
- Genre: Anthology; Horror
- Written by: Tom de Ville; Mike Basset; Peter Crowther; Andrew Cull; Dominic McDonagh; Frank Tallis
- Directed by: Marcus D.F. White; Otto Bathurst; Chris Bould; Colin Bucksey; Tom de Ville; Paul Hills; Ian Knox; Andrew Morgan
- Composers: Paul Cartledge; Philip J. Jewson
- Country of origin: United Kingdom
- No. of seasons: 2
- No. of episodes: 22

Production
- Executive producers: Steve Matthews; Victor Glynn
- Producer: John Price
- Cinematography: Mike Thomson
- Editors: Robert C. Dearberg; Crispin Green
- Running time: 30 mins
- Production companies: Blackjack Productions; Columbia TriStar Television; Golden Square Pictures

Original release
- Network: Channel 5
- Release: 17 May 2000 – 28 December 2001

Urban Gothic is a British anthology horror series shown on Channel 5, running for two seasons between May 2000 and December 2001. Filmed on a low budget and broadcast in a later time-slot, it nonetheless acquired a following. It has also since been repeated on the Horror Channel.

Set around London there is an underlying story thread that only becomes clear in the last episodes of each series. Each episode was different in style from the others, running the gamut of documentary-style independent film to spoof, to slick dramas similar in style to The Outer Limits or The Twilight Zone.

Cast of the series include Jemima Rooper, Ingrid Pitt, Crispin Bonham-Carter, Robert Webb, Nina Sosanya, Lee Williams, Anita Dobson, Charlie Condou, Leslie Grantham, Sean Maguire, Richard O'Brien, Alicya Eyo, Liz May Brice, Clare Buckfield, Andrew Lancel, Rupert Hill, Alison King and Sarah Smart.

== Episodes ==
=== Series 1 (2000) ===
| No. overall | No. in series | Title | Written by | Original release date |
|---|---|---|---|---|
| 1 | 1 | "Dead Meat" | Tom de Ville | 17 May 2000 |
After stealing an expensive drug from a drug dealer, two teenagers discover the dead body of a man in an abandoned warehouse, and decide to resurrect the body with the help of their friend Milton, an expert in necromancy.
| 2 | 2 | "Vampirology" | Tom de Ville | 24 May 2000 |
A documentary crew follow Rex, a 100-year-old vampire, around Soho for one night and learn his views on life, death and friends. Guest starring Ingrid Pitt (playing herself).
| 3 | 3 | "Old Nick" | Tom de Ville | 31 May 2000 |
A young boy named Jake moves into a block of flats with his mother, but he soon discovers that strange deaths are common around his new home. Jake befriends a girl named Sadie, who tries to convince him that his elderly neighbour is actually the Devil.
| 4 | 4 | "Lacuna" | Tom de Ville | 7 June 2000 |
Two drug addicts break into a mental hospital to steal medicinal drugs, but they become trapped when a matron mistakes them for patients who are trying to escape.
| 5 | 5 | "Deptford Voodoo" | Tom de Ville | 14 June 2000 |
Saul Darrow – a social worker – becomes embroiled in a confrontation between a gang of young thieves and a vengeful voodoo spirit named 'Papa Legba'. Guest starring Louis Mahoney (playing Papa Legba).
| 6 | 6 | "Sum of the Parts" | Tom de Ville | 21 June 2000 |
Two police detectives investigate a series of mysterious deaths in a hospital, with all the victims being people who have received donated organs. During the investigation, the detectives uncover the shocking origins of the donated organs. Guest Starring Terry Molloy (playing Dr Greer) and Alison Pargeter (playing Leila Haze).
| 7 | 7 | "The One Where..." | Tom de Ville | 5 July 2000 |
A woman meets a mysterious man named Lucien in an art gallery and introduces him to her group of friends. Eventually however, Lucien begins to use his skills in manipulation to ruin his new friend's lives. Guest starring Robert Webb (playing Bentley Kaye).
| 8 | 8 | "Cry Wolf" | Tom de Ville | 12 July 2000 |
After the dead body of a policeman is found in an abandoned cinema, the police discover and apprehend a feral man. Feeling sympathetic and developing a sexual attraction towards him, police doctor Miranda Sharpe takes the feral man, naming him 'Raksha', into her home and tries to educate him. However, it is soon discovered that Raksha is not entirely human...
| 9 | 9 | "Be Movie" | Tom de Ville | 19 July 2000 |
A group of rowdy students, including an isolated American teenager obsessed with horror films, find themselves trapped in a real-life slasher film.
| 10 | 10 | "Pineapple Chunks" | Tom de Ville | 26 July 2000 |
A dysfunctional, working-class family move into a seemingly idyllic suburban community, but strange things start to happen and their daughter Kylie discovers that the neighbours are more than they appear to be, and the cans of pineapple chunks sold at the local shop have a sinister purpose...
| 11 | 11 | "The Boy's Club" | Tom de Ville | 2 August 2000 |
Lenny Scratch – a young, hot shot gangster – is forced to do horrific things to buy his way into the mysterious 'Boy's Club', an exclusive club for London's most powerful gangsters. Guest starring Leslie Grantham (playing Lenny's father George Scratch).
| 12 | 12 | "Turn On" | Tom de Ville | 9 August 2000 |
Following a phantom pregnancy, a woman named Jane – convinced that she actually was pregnant – is emotionally abused by her husband Peter. As she slips slowly into madness, Jane makes a shocking discovery about herself: she's actually an android.
| 13 | 13 | "Thirteen" | Tom de Ville | 16 August 2000 |
A year after the events of 'Dead Meat', Jude Redfield – a struggling and frustrated reporter – is chosen to be the next 'Storyteller' of London. Guest starring Richard O'Brien (playing the Storyteller) and Sean Maguire (playing Jude Redfield).

=== Series 2 (2001) ===
| No. overall | No. in series | Title | Written by | Original release date |
|---|---|---|---|---|
| 14 | 1 | "Sandman" | Michael J. Bassett | 22 October 2001 |
A group of people compete in a 'Touch the Truck' style game show where they all have to touch a sports car and the last person touching it is the winner. However, as the contestants struggle with sleep deprivation, they are targeted by the homicidal Sandman.
| 15 | 2 | "Membrane" | Tom De Ville | 29 October 2001 |
A task force is sent into a laboratory to retrieve security footage in the aftermath of an event that killed everyone working there. In their investigation, the group comes across evidence of human genetic experimentation.
| 16 | 3 | "Necromance" | Dominic McDonagh | 5 November 2001 |
Poppy, an alienated teenager, uses a spell book to transform herself into her school crush's ideal woman. However, after the spell is cast, Poppy discovers that her crush is actually a necrophile, so the spell ends up turning her into a zombie.
| 17 | 4 | "Eater" | Peter Crowther | 12 November 2001 |
The police arrest a cannibalistic serial killer and keep him in custody, but the killer escapes from his cell and runs amok in the police station, using his strange shape-shifting abilities to disguise himself as the police officers he has killed.
| 18 | 5 | "Serotonin Wild" | Tom De Ville | 19 November 2001 |
Three students are selected to undergo a series of tests, referred to as 'The Heinzman Test', in which they are forced to commit crimes to protect the people they care about. Guest starring Anthony Daniels (playing Mr Tidyman).
| 19 | 6 | "Ritual Slaughter" | Frank Tallis | 26 November 2001 |
A woman with obsessive compulsive disorder is staying in a mental hospital, and she believes that her compulsive rituals prevent her violent thoughts from harming other people. Her new therapist tries to convince her otherwise, but all is not as it seems.
| 20 | 7 | "The End" | Andrew Cull | 25 December 2001 |
The usual programme is interrupted by a live video feed from two police officers and a hacker who are barricaded in a house and pleading for help in the midst of an extremely violent riot.
| 21 | 8 | "Dollhouse Burns: Part 1" | Tom De Ville | 28 December 2001 |
Kali, one of the teenagers from 'Serotonin Wild', is discovered barely alive in a freezer, and a pair of government agents question her about the mysterious 'Institute' who were behind the events of Serotonin Wild. Meanwhile, Jude Redfield returns and uncovers the Institute's sinister plans.
| 22 | 9 | "Dollhouse Burns: Part 2" | Tom De Ville | 28 December 2001 |
Jude, Kali and Milton the Zombie continue to battle against The Institute, and try to stop their evil plans to control London.
