= Gwen Taylor =

British actress (born 1939)

- Born: Gwendoline Allsop; 19 February 1939 (age 87); Crich, Derbyshire, England
- Education: East 15 Acting School
- Occupation: Actress
- Years active: 1972–present
- Spouse: Graham Reid (m. 1996)

Gwen Taylor (born 19 February 1939) is an English actress who has appeared in many British television programmes. She is known for her roles as Amy Pearce in the sitcom Duty Free (1984–1986), Barbara Liversidge in the sitcom Barbara (1999–2003), Peggy Armstrong in the drama series Heartbeat (2005–2009), Anne Foster in the long-running ITV soap opera Coronation Street (2011–2012), and Vi Highway in BBC One soap opera EastEnders (2021–2023). She was nominated for the 1990 BAFTA TV Award for Best Actress for her role as Rita Simcock in the comedy series A Bit of a Do (1989). Her film appearances include Monty Python's Life of Brian (1979) and The Lady in the Van (2015). In 1981, Taylor was nominated for the Olivier Award for Best Actress in a Supporting Role for her performance as Gertrude in Hamlet.

== Biography ==
Gwen Taylor was born on 19 February 1939 in Crich, Derbyshire. Her initial career was in banking, but when she was an assistant area manager for the National Provincial Bank in Derby she became increasingly interested in amateur dramatics. Her first professional acting role was as a Green Bean in Jack and the Beanstalk at the Derby Playhouse. Taylor trained at East 15 Acting School, London. She played Josephine in A Taste of Honey, in one of the earliest productions at the newly opened Crucible Theatre in Sheffield, in 1972. In 1973, she played Pamela Dean, the sister of the murder victim Victor Dean, in Murder Must Advertise, an adaptation of Dorothy L Sayers's novel. In 1975, she played the role of Jack Regan's girlfriend, a probation officer named Anne Knightley, in the fourth episode of the second series of the British police drama The Sweeney, "Big Brother".

Later in the 1970s, she was one of the regulars on Eric Idle's Rutland Weekend Television. She also appeared in other Monty Python spin-offs such as The Life of Brian and Ripping Yarns, and in a dual role as both Chastity and Mrs Iris Mountbatten in the Beatles parody All You Need Is Cash. On the film's DVD commentary, Eric Idle described her as "the best comedy actress I ever worked with. She could do anything." However, she turned down a role in The Meaning of Life, as she thought that being covered in intestines as a man exploded in a restaurant would be "tasteless".

In 1990, she was nominated for a BAFTA as Best Actress for her role in A Bit of a Do opposite David Jason. Between 2005 and 2009, she played the role of Peggy Armstrong in the drama Heartbeat. In July 2011, it was announced that Taylor would be joining the cast of Coronation Street, playing Anne Foster, the mother of the villainous Frank Foster (Andrew Lancel). She departed the series after her character was revealed as the killer of her rapist son on 19 March 2012. In November 2012, she appeared with Don Warrington in the stage version of Driving Miss Daisy on a UK-wide tour. Taylor played various roles in Tracey Ullman's Show on the BBC in 2016 and 2017, and played Lillian in an episode of the Sky 1 sitcom Trollied in 2018. In May 2021, she joined the cast of BBC soap opera EastEnders playing Vi Highway.

== Selected filmography ==
Year	Title	Role	Notes
Film
1978	All You Need is Cash	Mrs. Mountbatten/Chastity	
1979	Monty Python's Life of Brian	Mrs Big Nose/Woman with sick donkey/Young Girl	
1980	Richard's Things	Margaret	
2015	The Lady in the Van	Mam	
2017	Small Town Killers	Miss Nippleworthy	Original Denmark title: Dræberne fra Nibe
2017	Another Mother's Son	Lily Vibert	
Television
1972	Dead of Night	Tessa	BBC anthology (1 episode)
1972	Kate	Jo	ITV drama (1 episode)
1973	Play for Today	Sally Brown	1 episode: Land of Green Ginger
1973	Murder Must Advertise	Pamela Dean	Miniseries (2 episodes)
1974	Badger's Set	Leila	TV sitcom pilot
1974	Crown Court	Anne Wills	ITV drama (2 episodes)
1974	John Halifax, Gentleman	Ursula March	Miniseries (5 episodes)
1974	Village Hall	Hilary	ITV comedy drama (1 episode)
1974	Z Cars	Anne Evans	Crime series (1 episode)
1975–1976	Rutland Weekend Television	Various	BBC sketch-show (14 episodes)
1975	The Nearly Man	Dorothy Hibbert	ITV drama (4 episodes)
1975	The Punch Review	Various	BBC sketch show (1 episode)
1975	Space: 1999	Nurse	ITV sci-fi (1 episode)
1975	The Sweeney	Anne Knightly	ITV crime (1 episode)
1975	Within These Walls	Miss White	ITV drama (1 episode)
1976	Second City Firsts	The woman	BBC drama (1 episode)
1976	The New Avengers	Doctor Marlow	ITV action (1 episode)
1977	Middlemen	Fay	BBC sitcom (3 episodes)
1978	Hazell	Mrs Ford	ITV drama (1 episode)
1978	The Rutles: All You Need Is Cash	Mrs Iris Mountbatten/Chastity	TV film
1978	Send in the Girls	Eileen	ITV drama (1 episode)
1979	Ripping Yarns	Eileen Ottershaw	BBC sitcom (1 episode)
1980	Sounding Brass	Cynthia Wildgoose	ITV comedy (6 episodes)
1981	Only When I Laugh	Victoria Plumtree	ITV sitcom (1 episode)
1982	Sorry I'm a Stranger Here Myself	Bebe	ITV sitcom (1 episode)
1983	Goodnight and God Bless	Sandra	ITV sitcom (1 episode)
1984	Play for Today	Mavis Martin	1 Episode: A Coming to Terms for Billy
1984–1986	Duty Free	Amy Pearce	ITV sitcom (22 episodes)
1985	Alas Smith & Jones	Various	BBC sketch show (1 episode)
1985	Lytton's Diary	Angela Monroe	ITV drama (1 episode)
1986	Slip-Up	Charmian Biggs	BBC television film
1988	Colin's Sandwich	Mrs D'Arcy	BBC sitcom (1 episode)
1988	Yes, Prime Minister	Agnes Moorhouse	BBC sitcom (1 episode)
1989	A Bit of a Do	Rita Simcock	BAFTA TV Award nomination (13 episodes)
1989	Sob Sisters	Liz	ITV sitcom (7 episodes)
1990	Screenplay	Winnie	1 episode
1990	Mistress of Suspense	Olivia Emery	1 episode
1991	Murder Most Horrid	Beryl	BBC comedy (1 episode)
1991	The Sharp End	Celia Forrest	BBC comedy (8 episodes)
1992	Inspector Morse	Margaret Cliff	ITV detective series (1 episode)
1992	Screaming	Annie	BBC sitcom (8 episodes)
1993–1994	Conjugal Rites	Gen Masefield	ITV sitcom (13 episodes)
1994	The Detectives	Annie	BBC comedy (1 episode)
1995	Moving Story	Nesta	ITV comedy drama (1 episode)
1995	Some Kind of Life	Sandra	ITV television film
1995	Class Act	Virginia Gilmore	ITV comedy drama (1 episode)
1997	A Perfect State	Laura Fitzgerald	BBC sitcom (7 episodes)
1997	Pilgrim's Rest	Tilly	BBC sitcom (6 episodes)
1997	Wycliffe	Alma Petheric	ITV crime series (1 episode)
1995, 1999–2003	Barbara	Barbara Liversidge	ITV sitcom (29 episodes)
2002	Midsomer Murders	Frances LeBon	Episode "Ring Out Your Dead"
2003	Belonging	Margaret	BBC drama (1 episode)
2003	Born and Bred	Dora Brisley	British comedy drama (2 episodes)
2005	Fat Friends	Mrs Thompson	ITV drama (1 episode)
2005–2010	Heartbeat	Peggy Armstrong	ITV drama (98 episodes)
2009	Doc Martin	Mrs Selkirk	Episode "The Departed"
2011–2012	Coronation Street	Anne Foster	ITV soap opera (47 episodes)
2016–2017	Tracey Ullman's Show	Various	BBC Comedy sketch show (6 episodes)
2018	Trollied	Lillian	Sky 1 sitcom (1 episode)
2020	Doctors	Olive Wolverton	Episode: "Mrs Wolf"
2021–2023	EastEnders	Vi Highway	Series regular (77 episodes)

== Awards and nominations ==
Year	Award	Category	Work	Result	Ref.
1981	Laurence Olivier Awards	Best Actress in a Supporting Role	Hamlet	Nominated	
1990	British Academy Television Awards	Best Actress	A Bit of a Do	Nominated	
2006	12th National Television Awards	Most Popular Actress	Heartbeat	Nominated	
2021	Inside Soap Awards	Funniest Performance	EastEnders	Nominated	
