= Paul Clayton (actor) =

English actor

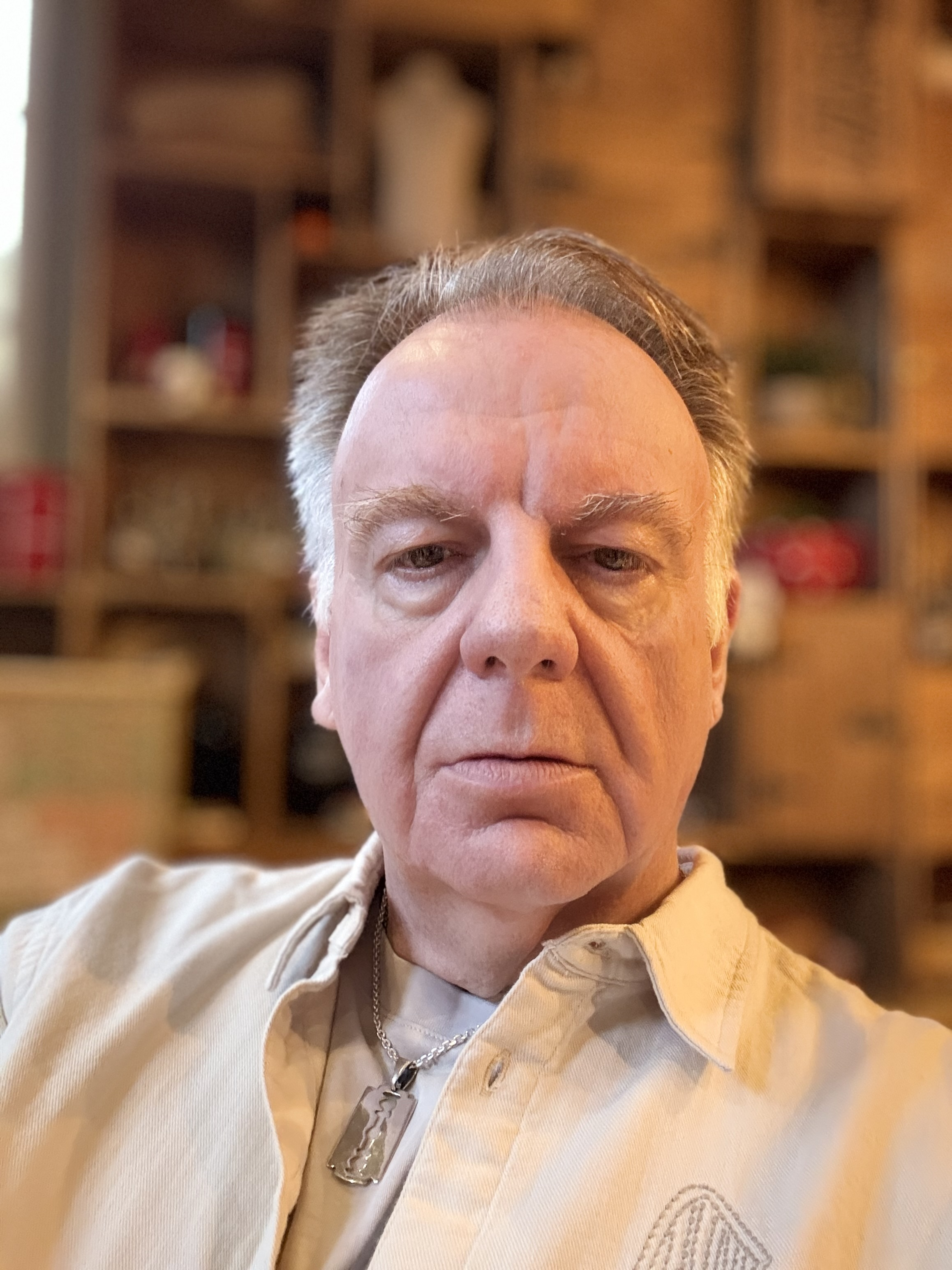
- Paul Clayton in 2024
- Born: Sheffield, England
- Occupations: Actor, director, author, Columnist

Paul Clayton is an English actor, director and author.

== Career ==
Clayton played Ian Chapman in Channel 4 sitcom Peep Show. for five series. In 2011, Clayton portrayed Sam Foster, father of Frank Foster in Coronation Street. Clayton also appears in the BBC Three sitcom Him & Her where he plays Graham. In 2013 and 2014, he played Superintendent Marlow in Hollyoaks, until his character was murdered on 21 April.

Clayton has made other notable television appearances in Doctor Who, My Family, Doctors and Wire in the Blood, as well as films such as Ali G Indahouse. He also features in the British crime thriller The Rise.

Clayton filmed "Danny Boy" for Expectation films in November 2020. He appeared in the film Greed released in February 2020 and in Sky One original Breeders He also appears in an episode of Cursed for Netflix as Ladislas. He has also directed Joe Orton's The Ruffian on the Stair at The Hope Theatre in January 2019 featuring Lucy Benjamin, Gary Webster and Adam Buchanan. Clayton was seen in "Outrageous Fortune", the opening episode of Series two of Shakespeare & Hathaway: Private Investigators, alongside Alan Partridge in This Time with Alan Partridge, and in the acclaimed Black Earth Rising. He also appeared in season 2 of The Crown on Netflix as Bob Boothby. He also filmed Delicious with Dawn French for Sky One. Clayton made his first stage appearance following a hiatus of ten years in Brimstone and Treacle at the Hope Theatre in 2017; he was nominated for the Offie for Best Actor. In May 2018, Clayton appeared in major roles in Holby City and The Split on BBC One. He also shot the short horror picture Service directed by Theo Watkins.

Clayton plays Mr Colchester in Torchwood for Big Finish Productions.

In 2021 Clayton recorded "The Red List," a new adventure for Big Finish.

On stage, Clayton was a member of the Royal Shakespeare Company where he appeared alongside actors including Judi Dench and Zoe Wanamaker. In the West End, Clayton played the leading role of Tony in the improvised comedy whodunnit Scissor Happy at the Duchess Theatre alongside The Comedy Store Players.

Clayton's directing credits include Privates on Parade at the Greenwich Theatre, starring Tony Slattery, The Comedy of Errors at Nottingham Playhouse starring Robert Bathurst, Paula Wilcox and Janet Dibley, The Pocket Dream at York Theatre Royal starring Lucy Benjamin and seven productions at the Watermill Theatre, Newbury.

Clayton was Chairman of the Actors' Centre in Covent Garden for ten years, stepping down in January 2018 and a former member and associate artist of the National Youth Theatre. He is a regular columnist for The Stage newspaper and patron of The Hope Theatre in Islington. He is also a patron of children's literacy charity, Grimm & Co, based in his home town of Rotherham.

Clayton's most recent appearances inlucde Drew Peacock in BBC One's Eastenders, Sir William Kingsley in Wolf Hall The Mirror and the Light, and more Torchwood adventures for Big Finish.

He played Bernard Ingham in Channel 4's Brian and Maggie in 2025.

== Filmography ==
=== Film & Television ===
Year	Title	Role	Episode
2025	Brian and Maggie	Bernard Ingham	2 episodes
2024	EastEnders	Drew Peacock	Guest
2023	The Full Monty	Dennis	8 episodes
2022–2026	House of the Dragon	Lord Merryweather	Episodes: "The Green Council" and "Queen's Landing"
2020	Danny Boy	Sir Thayne Forbes	Film
2020	Holby City	Roger Ffoulkes	1 episode
2020	Breeders	Jeweller	1 episode
2019	Cursed	Ladislas	1 episode
2019	Shakespeare & Hathaway: Private Investigators	Leonard Baxter	1 episode
2019	This Time with Alan Partridge	Dr Harding	1 episode
2019	Holby City	Roger Ffoulkes	1 episode
2018	Greed	Headmaster	Film
2018	Holby City	Roger Ffoulkes	1 episode
2017	The Split	Stanley Brining	1 episode
2017	The Forgiving Earth	Jack Markham	1 episode
2017	The Crown	Bob Boothby	3 episodes
2016	Man in an Orange Shirt	Registrar	1 episode
2016	Drifters	Uncle Gerald	1 episode
2016	Delicious	Guy Trevelyan	1 episode
2016	The Frankenstein Chronicles	Confectioner	2 episodes
2015	Wolf Hall	Sir William Kingston	2 episodes
2015	Mr Selfridge	Auctioneer	Episode 3.3
2013–14	Hollyoaks	Supt. Marlow	9 episodes
2012–13	Him & Her	Graham	5 episodes
2013	Vera	Hotel Manager	Prodigal Son
2012	Gambit	Sweaty Man	Film
2012	The Secret of Crickley Hall	Ted Mason	Episode 1
2012	The Rise	Albert Rendell	Film
2012	VIP	The Daily Mail	1 episode
2011	Coronation Street	Sam Foster	3 episodes
2011	Sugartown	Panel Member 1	Episode 2
2011	Law & Order: UK	Kenny	Crush
2010	Doctors	Rowly Calderone	5 episodes
2009	The Queen	Bernard Ingham	Episode: "The Rivals"
2009	Monday Monday	William Campbell	Episode No. 1.6
2009	My Family	Peter	A Difficult Undertaking
2008	Wire in the Blood	Governor Williams	3 episodes
2008	Affinity	Mr. Vincy	TV film
2008	Doctor Who	Mr Bartle	Planet of the Ood
2008	He Kills Coppers	Tweed Suit	1 episode
2008	Doctors	Eddie Martindale	Holding Back
2007–2015	Peep Show	Ian Chapman	6 episodes
2007	Doctor Who: The Infinite Quest	Mergrass (voice)	3 episodes
2007	Hotel Babylon	Businessman	Episode No. 2.4
2007	Rich Man, Poor Man: Ben Dover Straightens Up	Himself – Acting Coach	Documentary
2006	The Amazing Mrs Pritchard	John Hughes MP	Episode No. 1.1
2006	The Bad Food Guide	Raymond Postgate	Drama documentary
2006	Save Lullingstone Castle	Himself – Narrator	Six Part documentary
2005	Coronation Street	Mal Quillan	Episode No. 1.6108
2005	55 Degrees North	Charles Bellows	Episode No. 2.4
2004	Fakers	Henry Price	Film
2003	Georgian Underworld	Ordinary	Invitation to a Hanging
2002	My Family	Director	The Second Greatest Story Ever Told
2002	Ali G Indahouse	Alan Swan	Film
2001	Doctors	John Lanson	Coming Home
2000	One Foot in the Grave	Mitch Werner	The Futility of the Fly
2000	The Man Who Cried	Second Official	Film
1999	Kiss Me Kate	Client	Money Matters
1999	Tabs Tales	Various	Multiple Episodes
1996	Drop the Dead Donkey	Mike	Luck
1989	Forever Green	Commentator 2	Episode No. 1.2
1988	Salome's Last Dance	1st Nazarean	Film
1982/83	Jigsaw	Himself – Presenter	Multiple Episodes
1981	Brideshead Revisited	Tom Markham	Orphans of the Storm
1980	All Creatures Great and Small	Brian Weeting	If Wishes Were Horses
1979	Screenplay	Major Von Richter (Barricade Major)	Gossip from the Forest
1979	Mersey Pirate	Himself – Presenter	Multiple episodes

=== Audio drama ===
Year	Title		Role	Notes
2024	Torchwood: Special Releases	A Christmas Card from Mr Colchester	Mr Colchester	A bonus audio released alongside "Reflect"
2024	Torchwood Monthly Range	Reflect	Mr Colchester	
2024	Torchwood: Special Releases	Another Postcard from Mr Colchester	Mr Colchester	A bonus audio released alongside "Sabotage"
2024	Torchwood Monthly Range	Sabotage	Mr Colchester	
2023	Torchwood: The Story Continues	Among Us	Mr Colchester	
2022	Torchwood: Special Releases	A Postcard from Mr Colchester	Mr Colchester	A bonus audio released alongside "Death in Venice"
2022	Torchwood Monthly Range	Death in Venice	Mr Colchester	
2021	Torchwood Monthly Range	The Red List	Mr Colchester	
2021	Doctor Who: Time Lord Victorious	Echoes of Extinction	Edwards	
2020	The Lives of Captain Jack Volume 03	Episode: "Crush"	Driver	
2019	The War Master: Rage of the Time Lords	Episode: "The Survivor"	Hale	
2019	Torchwood: The Story Continues	God Among Us	Mr Colchester	
2018	Torchwood: The Story Continues	God Among Us	Mr Colchester	
2018	Cicero Series 01		Sulla	
2018	Torchwood: The Story Continues	Aliens Among Us	Mr Colchester	
2017	Torchwood: The Story Continues	Aliens Among Us	Mr Colchester	
2016	Torchwood: Special Releases	The Torchwood Archive	Mr Colchester	
2014	Big Finish Special Releases	The Night of the Triffids	Bill Masen / General Fielding	Based on John Wyndham’s The Day of the Triffids
2013	The Confessions of Dorian Gray	The Prime of Deacon Brodie	William Wright	
2005	Bernice Summerfield	The Kingdom of the Blind	Forty Four	
2003	Doctor Who: The Monthly Adventures	The Wormery	Henry	
2003	2000AD	Judge Dredd: War Planet	Glomi	
