= Alison King =

English actress and model

- Born: Alison Rosamund King; 3 March 1973 (age 53); Leicester, England
- Education: South Charnwood High School
- Occupations: Actress; model
- Years active: 1985, 1995–present
- Known for: Dream Team; Coronation Street
- Children: 1
- Awards: Full list

Alison Rosamund King (born 3 March 1973) is an English actress and model. She is known for her roles as Lynda Block in the Sky One drama series Dream Team (1998–2003, 2005–2007), and Carla Connor-Swain in the long-running ITV soap opera Coronation Street (2006–present). She won Best Actress at the 2012 British Soap Awards.

== Early life ==
Alison King was born at the Leicester Royal Infirmary. She is the youngest of three daughters and a son born to nurses Alex and June King. She grew up in Markfield, Leicestershire where she attended South Charnwood High School, where she first took an interest in acting. She continued to act while attending Groby Community College, where a teacher would offer drama and dance classes to students in their free time. At the age of 18, King moved to Newquay, Cornwall, where she worked at Fat Willys Surf Shack. She surfed in her spare time, and spent four years as a dental nurse. When she was 22, she enrolled at the North Cheshire Theatre School.

King was raised as a Christadelphian.

== Career ==
During her time at theatre school, King landed her first television role playing Helen, a hair salon crimper, in two episodes of Brookside. Before the conclusion of her three-year diploma, she was cast in the major role of Lynda Block in Sky One's, Dream Team. She appeared on the show for three years and left when the character was sent to prison. She reprised the role some years later. During her break from working on Dream Team, she worked on several projects abroad including a role as an extra in the American feature film, Shanghai Knights — appearing in a scene as a prostitute alongside Jackie Chan and Owen Wilson — supporting major roles such as BBC comedy-drama, Help, as well as video film, Submerged (2005) and feature film, Final Contract: Death on Delivery, both action films. She said of working on Submerged: "The first one was with Steven Seagal, which was filmed in Bulgaria. He's a member of the American military and I'm Dimita – the best field op in the business. I'm an action girl with a high ponytail doing lots of stunts. The stunt guy had worked with Angelina Jolie on Tomb Raider and he showed me how to hang upside down from things, how to jump down into dams and how to strangle people with my knees. It was great fun." She said of Final Contract: "In that one I was armed with a crossbow and chasing round in speedboats and fighting". Her work in Submerged was complimented as an impression of Angelina Jolie.

King made a guest appearance in the final episode of Mile High, playing the wife of Captain Nigel Croker, and was featured in Coupling in the episode "The Man with Two Legs", as Chrissy with whom Jeff Murdock becomes infatuated on his morning train ride. She appeared in Holby City as the distressed wife of a hospital patient, and made a brief appearance as a receptionist in the film, Fat Slags. She played prominent roles for two independent films, Save Angel Hope (2006) and Back in Business (2007). In 2000, she appeared in an episode of Cold Feet as "Girlpower", a seductive internet avatar. King also appeared in the second episode of the fourth series of Auf Wiedersehen, Pet in 2004.

In 2018, King appeared in four episodes of the Sky One programme, Sick Note as Superintendent Henchy which marked her first appearance in a Sky One production since the end of Dream Team.

=== Coronation Street ===
In 2006, she was cast as Carla Connor in the ITV soap opera, Coronation Street. She made her first appearance in the role in the episode broadcast on 1 December 2006. She had previously appeared in the soap in 2004 as an unrelated character named Mrs. Fanshaw. Her one-episode role was part of a larger storyline to "sex up" Ryan Thomas's character, builder Jason Grimshaw. She went on maternity leave in 2009. King's role in the soap involved high-profile storylines. In 2010, she was involved in the death of Tony Gordon storyline, in which she had to be kidnapped in the Underworld factory. In 2011, King's character was raped by her boyfriend, Frank Foster. King later said there was an 800% increase in calls to support organisations after the storyline had aired, and that people had contacted her about their real-life experiences, some of whom she kept in communication with. Her performance in the rape storyline led to a Best Actress award at the 2012 British Soap Awards.

In May 2015, it was announced that King would be taking an extended break from Coronation Street to pursue other projects. However, in January 2016, it was confirmed that the departure would be permanent. She spoke to Radio Times of her reason to leave: "I've probably only ever done about 20 pickups or drop offs in all the time my daughter's been at school, which is quite sad. And creatively, I miss being other people. It's what I went to drama school for. I love playing diverse characters and meeting new people. And, truthfully, I also want to be able to get my voiceover career going again. There's all sorts of things that I used to do, which I can't do while I'm on Coronation Street. So, those are the reasons, really." Her departure aired on 26 May 2016. She later said that she blames Coronation Street for "destroying her feet and shattering her vocal cords", regretting that she agreed to portray Carla Connor for 10 years with a gravelly voice and high heels. She said "Coronation Street ruined my body."

In late 2016/early 2017, King greeted fans in a virtual reality video during Coronation Street tour. She spoke of filming the video for the tour: "It is surreal because is the original set and I know how many scenes I've filmed in there. But as an actress, no matter how long you have off, being back on set you still feel like you've never left. This is obviously a bit different because I'm being Ali and not Carla. I keep looking round for them to shout action. It has been my home for 10 years so I am quite at home being on set." In August 2017, it was announced that King would reprise her role as Carla in December that year. Her return aired on 22 December 2017. Since her return, King has been nominated for a British Soap Award for 'Best Female'.

=== Other ventures ===
King was the face of Boddingtons beer in 2004. She made appearances in a series of recurring television adverts for Daz titled "Cleaner Close", a parody of soap operas. In the late 1990s, King appeared in various modelling shoots.

King is considered by the press as a British sex symbol.

== Personal life ==
In 2014, it was reported that King had requested extra security from ITV bosses after it emerged she had a female stalker. Despite formal requests to stay away after being found lurking outside of her house, the woman approached her at a public event, Southport Flower Show, resulting in a distressed King leaving the event earlier than intended.

King had a five-year relationship with former Coronation Street actor Philip Middlemiss (who played Des Barnes). In 2006, she became engaged to fellow actor Jim Alexander who co-starred in several series of Dream Team with her, as well as the Daz adverts. However, the pair split in early 2007. She briefly dated fellow soap actor Louis Emerick following the split. The actress dated Adam Huckett, a Coronation Street sound technician from April 2007. She gave birth to their daughter on 11 February 2009. King became engaged to Huckett in September 2011 while on a trip to Paris, however, on 16 October 2012 it was reported that the engagement was off as they had split up.

In 2016, King had been dating Hollyoaks assistant director Paul Slavin. She said of the relationship: "I'm seeing somebody. It's very early days so I don't want to say anything more, but I'm happy." However, in November 2018, she was pictured with a new "mystery" man and in August 2019, it was reported that they were engaged. In an OK Magazine cover and interview in September 2019, King posed for photos with her new fiancé, David Stuckley, and announced their engagement. In May 2022, the couple split and called off their engagement.

== Filmography ==
Film
Year	Title	Role	Notes
2000	Scooter Mum	Imelda	Short film
2003	Shanghai Knights	Prostitute	
2004	Fat Slags	Receptionist	
2005	Submerged	Damita	Direct-to-video
2006	Final Contract: Death on Delivery	Lara	
2007	Back in Business	Covington	
2007	Save Angel Hope	Jacqui Lydon	
2008	All Day Breakfast	Unnamed	Short film
2010	Judith in the Tent of Holofernes	Judith	Short film

Television
Year	Title	Role	Notes
1998	Brookside	Helen	Episode: "Noisy Stuff"
1998–2003, 2005–2007	Dream Team	Lynda Block	Series regular; 234 episodes
2000	Cold Feet	Girlpower	Season 3: Episode 5
2001	Coupling	Chrissie	Episode: "The Man with Two Legs"
2001	Urban Gothic	Stella McDonald	Episode: "The End"
2002	Cutting It	Georgie Cates	Season 1: Episode 2
2002	Celeb	Zoe	Episode: "The Infatuation"
2003	Holby City	Becky Roper	Episode: "...As the Day is Long"
2003	Murphy's Law	Ang	Episode: "Reunion"
2003	Doctors	Lisa Durrel	Episode: "Survival of the Fittest"
2004	Auf Wiedersehen, Pet	Erica Trasker	Episode: "Our Men in Havana"
2004	Coronation Street	Mrs Fanshaw	Episode #1.5718
2005	Help	Rebecca	Main cast; 5 episodes
2005	Mile High	Denise Croker	Season 2: Episode 26
2006–present	Coronation Street	Carla Connor-Swain	Series regular
2008	Last Chance	Helen	Television film
2012	Fragments	Kitty	Unknown episodes
2018	Sick Note	Chief Superintendent Christine Henchy	Supporting role; 4 episodes

== Awards and nominations ==
Award	Year	Category	Nominated work	Result	Ref.
All About Soap Awards	2012	Best Actress	Coronation Street as Carla Connor	Nominated	
The British Soap Awards	2007	Sexiest Female	Coronation Street as Carla Connor	Nominated	
The British Soap Awards	2011	Sexiest Female	Coronation Street as Carla Connor	Nominated	
The British Soap Awards	2012	Best Actress	Coronation Street as Carla Connor	Won	
The British Soap Awards	2012	Best Dramatic Performance	Coronation Street as Carla Connor	Nominated	
The British Soap Awards	2015	Best Actress	Coronation Street as Carla Connor	Nominated	
The British Soap Awards	2016	Best Actress	Coronation Street as Carla Connor	Nominated	
The British Soap Awards	2019	Best Actress	Coronation Street as Carla Connor	Nominated	
Daily Star Soaper Star Awards	2008	Best Bitch	Coronation Street as Carla Connor	Won	
Digital Spy Reader Awards	2011	Best Soap Actress	Coronation Street as Carla Connor	Third	
Digital Spy Reader Awards	2012	Best Female Soap Actor	Coronation Street as Carla Connor	Fifth	
Digital Spy Reader Awards	2014	Best Female Soap Actor	Coronation Street as Carla Connor	Second	
Digital Spy Reader Awards	2015	Best Soap Actor	Coronation Street as Carla Connor	Fourth	
Digital Spy Soap Awards	2008	Sexiest Female	Coronation Street as Carla Connor	Nominated	
Inside Soap Awards	2008	Best Bitch	Coronation Street as Carla Connor	Won	
Inside Soap Awards	2009	Best Bitch	Coronation Street as Carla Connor	Nominated	
Inside Soap Awards	2010	Best Dramatic Performance	Coronation Street as Carla Connor	Nominated	
Inside Soap Awards	2010	Sexiest Female	Coronation Street as Carla Connor	Nominated	
Inside Soap Awards	2015	Best Actress	Coronation Street as Carla Connor	Won	
Inside Soap Awards	2019	Best Actress	Coronation Street as Carla Connor	Nominated	
Inside Soap Awards	2025	Best Partnership with Vicky Myers	Coronation Street as Carla Connor	Won	
National Television Awards	2012	Best Serial Drama Performance	Coronation Street as Carla Connor	Nominated	
National Television Awards	2016	Best Serial Drama Performance	Coronation Street as Carla Connor	Nominated	
RTS North West Awards	2014	Best Performance in a Continuing Drama	Coronation Street as Carla Connor	Won	
TV Choice Awards	2012	Best Soap Actress	Coronation Street as Carla Connor	Nominated	
TV Choice Awards	2015	Best Soap Actress	Coronation Street as Carla Connor	Won	
TV Choice Awards	2019	Best Soap Actress	Coronation Street as Carla Connor	Won	
TVTimes Awards	2008	Sexiest Female	Coronation Street as Carla Connor	Won	
TVTimes Awards	2019	Favourite Soap Star	Coronation Street as Carla Connor	Nominated	
