= Andrew Lancel =

British actor

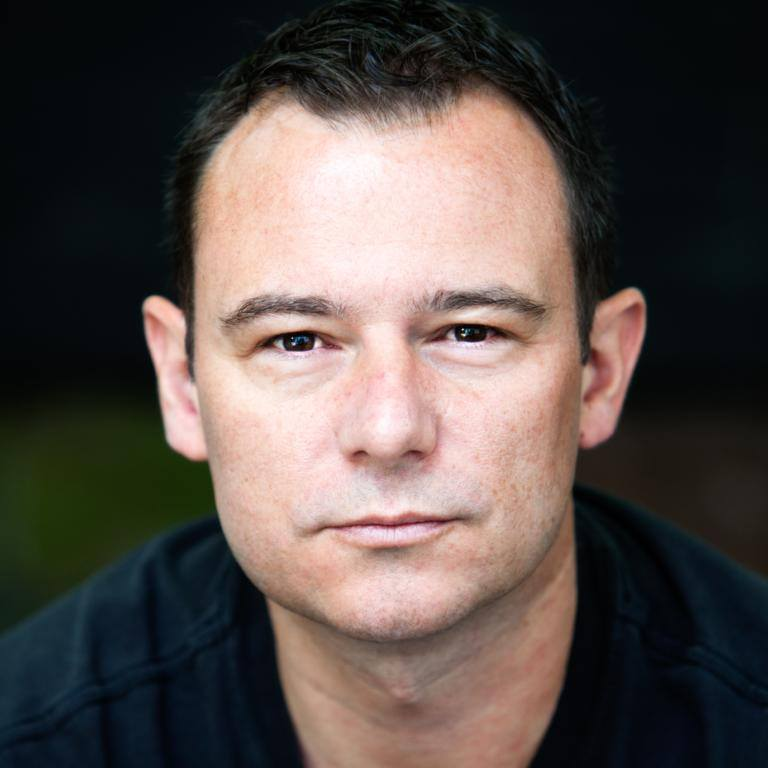
- Born: Andrew Watkinson; Rufford, Lancashire, England
- Occupations: Actor, singer
- Years active: 1993–present
- Spouse: Louise Edge (m. 2005)
- Children: 2

Andrew Lancel (born Andrew Watkinson) is an English television and theatre actor, producer and director. He is best known for his appearance as Dr. Andrew Collin in Cardiac Arrest, his role as DI Neil Manson in The Bill and Frank Foster in the long-running ITV soap opera Coronation Street, as well as his portrayal of Brian Epstein in the stage play Epstein – The Man Who Made The Beatles.

== Biography ==
Andrew Lancel was born in Rufford, Lancashire. He started his acting career in local theatre and as a cabaret singer. In 1993, he appeared in the TV film Wide-Eyed and Legless with Julie Walters, Jim Broadbent and Thora Hird. He gained fame as the lead role in the medical series Cardiac Arrest with Helen Baxendale. Since then, he has become a theatre and television actor. He was described as the most realistic doctor on TV and sporadically was TV's most hated man, after roles in City Central, Bad Girls and Queer as Folk.

He is best known for his role as DI Neil Manson in the long running ITV series The Bill, a role he played from 2003 until 2010, as well as the Frank Foster in Coronation Street for which he won 'Villain of the Year' at the British Soap Awards.

A singer for many years, Lancel has also performed his own one-man show and has sung at the Sands in Blackpool and the Royal Albert Hall in London.

In addition to acting, Lancel runs his own production company and has produced and directed productions. In 2008, Lancel became a patron of the Unity Theatre, Liverpool.

Lancel was also a regular panellist on the Channel 5 TV show The Wright Stuff and also covered the Pete Price Radio Show.

Lancel is an avid supporter of Everton F.C. and was an original ambassador of Everton in the Community; he is also involved in the Everton Collection.

In summer 2010, he played a prison officer in an award-winning short film called Inside Run, directed by his former The Bill co-star Sam Callis which was shown at the BFI London Film Festival in October 2010. Of the film, Lancel said "it's a long way from Manson and a joy to be directed by Sam." He reunited with Callis for his next film, the short film Viking co-starring Sophie Thompson.

His stage role include Adam Snow in the Bill Kenwright produced production of the world premiere of The Small Hand in 2014, Juror 3 in Twelve Angry Men in 2015, and his performance as Brian Epstein in Epstein – The Man Who Made The Beatles.

In 2015, Lancel portrayed Brian Clough in a stage production of The Damned United. Lancel again played Brian Epstein in the Bill Kenwright production of Cilla The Musical, touring the UK for fifteen months to critical acclaim.

== Career ==
=== Television ===
Following his role in Cardiac Arrest Lancel appeared in TV series including Liverpool 1, The Vice, Urban Gothic and Merseybeat and portrayed oles in the shows City Central and Queer As Folk and in the BBC medical drama Casualty. Series 8, episode 19 "Value for Money" (1994) and as a builder called Chris Perry in Series 28 Episode 48 "A Life Less Lived" (2014).

In 2002, he joined the cast of Bad Girls as Barry Pearce and his character was involved in a domestic abuse story line with on-screen wife Di Barker.

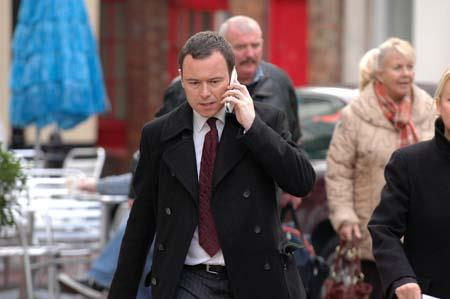
Lancel as Neil Manson in The Bill

In 2003, Andrew joined The Bill as DI Neil Manson and played the character until the programme was axed in 2010. His most notable and memorable storyline was the thirteen-month-long Amy Tennant missing person case, concerning a child who mysteriously vanished. This was also the longest storyline ever attempted in the history of The Bill.

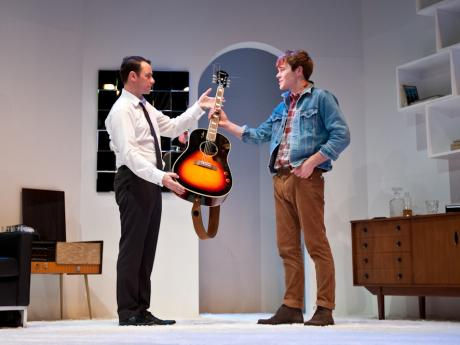
Andrew Lancel & Will Finlason in 'Epstein – The Man Who Made The Beatles'

In 2004, he entered Celebrity Stars in Their Eyes as A-ha singer Morten Harket and won.

On 23 November 2010, Lancel was cast in the long running ITV soap opera Coronation Street as Frank Foster, a business associate of Carla Connor. Another controversial role, Lancel's portrayal won him 'Villain of the Year' at the British Soap Awards in 2012. Lancel made his final appearance as Frank on 5 March 2012; when the character met his demise. Frank's murder was part of a whodunnit plot, and the murderer was revealed to be the character's own mother, Anne, in a shock twist. 2022-The Thief, His Wife and The Canoe as DS Paul Sampson.

In 2025, Lancel appeared in the new series of ITV's Unforgotten. Also in 2025, Lancel appeared in I Fought the Law as Guy Whitburn.

=== Theatre ===
In 2012, Lancel returned to the stage when he was cast as former Beatles manager Brian Epstein in Epstein – The Man Who Made the Beatles a new play by Andrew Sherlock which debuted at the Epstein Theatre in Liverpool on 15 November 2012. The newly refurbished theatre being named in honour of Brian Epstein. The play transferred to the West End at the Leicester Square Theatre in 2014. The play, and Lancel's performance as Epstein drew huge critical acclaim with Whats on Stage describing his performance as 'phenomenal' and London Theatre calling it 'mesmerising.'

In 2014, Lancel was cast as Adam Snow alongside Diane Keen and Robert Duncan in the world premiere of The Small Hand based on the book by Susan Hill and adapted by Clive Francis. The play, directed by Roy Marsden and produced by Bill Kenwright, premiered at the Theatre Royal Windsor before touring the UK.

Lancel joined the cast of Twelve Angry Men in 2015, following its West End run, and received rave reviews for his turn as juror number three, starring alongside Tom Conti and Denis Lill.

In November 2015, it was announced that Lancel would be taking on the role of Brian Clough in a new stage adaptation of The Damned United based on the novel by David Peace. The play is a co-production between Red Ladder and West Yorkshire Playhouse.

In May 2016, it was announced that Lancel will be making his musical debut, undertaking the role of Captain Von Trapp in the UK Tour of The Sound of Music.

Following a national touring starring as Detective Superintendent Vetch in Ruth Rendell's A Judgement in Stone (again directed by Roy Marsden and produced by Bill Kenwright) he once again returned to the role of Brian Epstein in Jeff Pope's Cilla the Musical, an adaption of his ITV drama Cilla. The musical opened in September 2017 at the Liverpool Empire.

== Personal life ==
Lancet was found not guilty of charges that arose in November 2012, regarding indecent assault on child under 16. The judge ordered the jury not to find him guilty of two of the six charges. In a short while, the jury found him not guilty of the remaining four, clearing him of all charges.
