= List of former Coronation Street characters =

Coronation Street is a British television soap opera. It was first broadcast on ITV on 9 December 1960. The following is a list of all the former characters and the actors who portrayed them in chronological order.

== 1960s ==
=== Last appeared in 1960 ===
Character	Actor(s)	Duration
Elsie Lappin	Maudie Edwards	1960
May Hardman	Joan Heath	1960

=== Last appeared in 1961 ===
Character	Actor(s)	Duration
Malcolm Wilkinson	Antony Booth	1960–1961
Susan Cunningham	Patricia Shakesby	1960–1961
Tom Hayes	Dudley Foster	1961
Alice Burgess	Avis Bunnage	1961
Walter Fletcher	Donald Morley	1961
Ida Barlow	Noel Dyson	1960–1961
Mario Bonarti	Frank Coda	1961
Nona Willis	Barbara Ferris	1961
Jean Stark	Renny Lister	1961
Sylvia Snape	Patricia Routledge	1961

=== Last appeared in 1962 ===
Character	Actor(s)	Duration
Philippa Scopes	Jacqueline Jones	1962
Colin Appleby	Lawrence James	1962
Nancy Leathers	Norah Hammond	1961–1962
Sam Leach	Frank Atkinson	1962
Joan Akers	Anna Cropper	1962
Susan Schofield	Ann Mitton	1962

=== Last appeared in 1963 ===
Character	Actor(s)	Duration
Christine Appleby	Christine Hargreaves	1960–1963

=== Last appeared in 1964 ===
Character	Actor(s)	Duration
Walter Potts	Chris Sandford	1963–1964
Eddie Thomas	Douglas Austin	1964
Ted Ashley	Jerold Wells	1964
Laurie Fraser	Stanley Meadows	1963–1964
Rosemary Fraser	Clare Owen	1964
Martha Longhurst	Lynne Carol	1960–1964
Lily Haddon	Stephanie Bidmead	1964
Pip Mistral	Elaine Stevens	1964
Gus Lowman	Alister Williamson	1964
Christopher Hewitt	Stephen Ward	1962–1964
David Graham	Roger Adamson	1964
Tickler Murphy	Patrick McAlinney	1964
Harry Bailey	Ray Mort	1960–1962, 1964

=== Last appeared in 1965 ===
Character	Actor(s)	Duration
Stuart Hodges	Vernon Joyner	1964–1965
Leonard Swindley	Arthur Lowe	1961–1965
Florrie Lindley	Betty Alberge	1960–1965
Norman Lindley	Glyn Owen	1965
Roger Wain	Frazer Hines	1965
Edward Wormold	Robert Dorning	1965
Ted Bates	William Wymar	1965
Bob Maxwell	Donald Hewlett	1965
DS Sowman	Philip Stone	1961–1962, 1965
Moira Maxwell	Ann Castle	1965
Sandra Petty	Heather Moore	1964–1965
Charlie Moffitt	Gordon Rollings	1964–1965
Frank Turner	Tom Watson	1965
Dr Aston	Aleksander Browne	1963–1965

=== Last appeared in 1966 ===
Character	Actor(s)	Duration
Lionel Petty	Edward Evans	1965–1966
Jackie Marsh	Pamela Craig	1966
Fred Jackson	Joe Gladwin	1961, 1963–1964, 1966
Fred Nuttall	Larry Noble	1966
Joan Corrie	Maureen O'Reilly	1966
Clara Midgeley	Betty Hardy	1965–1966
Brenda Riley	Eileen Kennally	1966
Jim Mount	Barry Keagan	1965–1966
Mr Snape	John Barcroft	1966
Arnold Tanner	Frank Cranshaw	1961, 1966
Ruth Winter	Colette O'Neill	1966
Sid Lambert	Graham Rigby	1965–1966
Moira Maxwell	Ann Castle	1965–1966
Neil Crossley	Geoffrey Matthews	1963, 1966

=== Last appeared in 1967 ===
Character	Actor(s)	Duration
Vera Lomax	Ruth Holden	1960–1961, 1963, 1966–1967
Ernie Mills	Jack Grieve	1966–1967
Sgt. Bowden	James Beck	1964–1967
Harry Hewitt	Ivan Beavis	1960–1965, 1967
Steve Tanner	Paul Maxwell	1967
Ivan Cheveski	Ernst Walder	1960–1963, 1966–1967

=== Last appeared in 1968 ===
Character	Actor(s)	Duration
George Dickenson	Stan Jay	1963–1966, 1968
Myra Booth	Susan Jameson	1963–1964, 1968
David Barlow	Alan Rothwell	1960–1961, 1963–1968
Les Clegg	John Sharp	1968
Gary Bailey	Warren Clarke	1968
Alf Chadwick	Eddie King	1964–1965, 1968
Arnold	John Tordoff	1968

=== Last appeared in 1969 ===
Character	Actor(s)	Duration
Effie Spicer	Ann Dyson	1968–1969
Alice Pickens	Doris Hare	1968–1969
Dot Greenhalgh	Joan Francis	1961–1969
Arthur Walker	Jack Allen	1965, 1969

== 1970s ==
=== Last appeared in 1970 ===
Character	Actor(s)	Duration
Anita Reynolds	Elisabeth Sladen	1970
Phyllis Gregory	Mary Quinn	1962, 1970
Doreen Lostock	Angela Crow	1961–1963, 1970
Jack Walker	Arthur Leslie	1960–1970
Dickie Fleming	Nigel Humphries	1968–1970
Audrey Fleming	Gillian McCann	1968–1970
Bernard Butler	Gorden Kaye	1969–1970
Joe Makinson	Brian Rawlinson	1961, 1963, 1970
Sandra Butler	Patricia Fuller	1969–1970
Joe Donnelli	Shane Rimmer	1967–1968, 1970

=== Last appeared in 1971 ===
Character	Actor(s)	Duration
Dave Robbins	Jon Rollason	1963–1964, 1969, 1971
Valerie Barlow	Anne Reid	1961–1971
Frank Barlow	Frank Pemberton	1960–1964, 1967, 1971
Irma Barlow	Sandra Gough	1964–1971
William Piggott	George A. Cooper	1965–1965, 1970–1971

=== Last appeared in 1972 ===
Character	Actor(s)	Duration
Paul Cheveski	Victoria Elton	1961–1962, 1966–1967, 1972
Paul Cheveski	Marcus Saville	1961–1962, 1966–1967, 1972
Paul Cheveski	Nigel Greaves	1961–1962, 1966–1967, 1972
Esther Hayes	Daphne Oxenford	1960–1963, 1971–1972
Cyril Turpin	William Moore	1969–1970, 1972
Fred Henshaw	Brian Glover	1972
Bert Henshaw	Paul Luty	1972
Colin Lomax	Davy Jones	1961, 1972
Colin Lomax	Alec Sabin	1961, 1972

=== Last appeared in 1973 ===
Character	Actor(s)	Duration
Tom Schofield	David Holliday	1965, 1973
Elaine Perkins	Joanna Lumley	1973

=== Last appeared in 1974 ===
Character	Actor(s)	Duration
Alan Howard	Alan Browning	1969–1974
Sir Julius Berlin	Leonard Sachs	1974
Lucille Hewitt	Jennifer Moss	1960–1974
Martin Downes	Louis Selwyn	1974
Norma Ford	Diana Davies	1972–1974
Sheila Birtles	Eileen Mayers	1961–1963, 1966, 1969–1970, 1974

=== Last appeared in 1975 ===
Character	Actor(s)	Duration
Maggie Cooke	Irene Sutcliffe	1968–1975
Vera Hopkins	Kathy Staff	1973–1975
Idris Hopkins	Richard Davies	1974–1975
Edna Gee	Mavis Rogerson	1971–1975
Jerry Booth	Graham Haberfield	1962–1968, 1971–1975
Concepta Riley	Doreen Keogh	1960–1964, 1967, 1972, 1975

=== Last appeared in 1976 ===
Character	Actor(s)	Duration
Dave Smith	Reginald Marsh	1962, 1966–1971, 1976
Donna Parker	Rachel Davies	1975–1976
Minnie Caldwell	Margot Bryant	1960–1976
Tricia Hopkins	Kathy Jones	1973–1976
Nellie Harvey	Mollie Sugden	1965, 1971–1974, 1976
Terry Bradshaw	Bob Mason	1976

=== Last appeared in 1977 ===
Character	Actor(s)	Duration
Stanley Fairclough	Peter Noone	1961, 1967, 1977
Stanley Fairclough	Ronald Cunliffe	1961, 1967, 1977
Stanley Fairclough	Jonathan Coy	1961, 1967, 1977
Janet Reid	Judith Barker	1969, 1971, 1973–1975, 1977
Vince Denton	Mike Heywood	1975, 1977
Vince Denton	Constantin de Goguel	1975, 1977

=== Last appeared in 1978 ===
Character	Actor(s)	Duration
Ernest Bishop	Stephen Hancock	1967, 1969–1978
Joan Walker	June Barry	1961, 1963–1964, 1978
Joan Walker	Dorothy White	1961, 1963–1964, 1978
Janice Stubbs	Angela Bruce	1978
Norman Hill	John Tordoff	1978

=== Last appeared in 1979 ===
Character	Actor(s)	Duration
Steve Fisher	Lawrence Mullin	1977–1979
Ron Mather	Joe Lynch	1978–1979

== 1980s ==
=== Last appeared in 1980 ===
Character	Actor(s)	Duration
Sam Littlewood	Harry Littlewood	1977, 1980
Ena Sharples	Violet Carson	1960–1980
Renee Bradshaw	Madge Hindle	1976–1980
Jeff Bateman	Peter Dean	1980
Martin Cheveski	Jonathan Caplan	1980

=== Last appeared in 1981 ===
Character	Actor(s)	Duration
Neil Grimshaw	Michael Le Vell	1981
Arnold Swain	George Waring	1980–1981

=== Last appeared in 1982 ===
Character	Actor(s)	Duration
Frank "Frankie" Baldwin	Sam Kydd	1980–1982
Wayne Gaskell	Philip Pollitt	1982
Ted Farrell	Gerald Sim	1982

=== Last appeared in 1983 ===
Character	Actor(s)	Duration
Len Fairclough	Peter Adamson	1961–1983
Suzie Birchall	Cheryl Murray	1977–1979, 1983
Bert Tilsley	Peter Dudley	1979–1983
Annie Walker	Doris Speed	1960–1983

=== Last appeared in 1984 ===
Character	Actor(s)	Duration
Bill Gregory	Jack Watson	1961–1962, 1970, 1983–1984
Elsie Tanner	Pat Phoenix	1960–1973, 1976–1984
Albert Tatlock	Jack Howarth	1960–1984
Stan Ogden	Bernard Youens	1964–1984
Beattie Pearson	Gabrielle Daye	1961–1962, 1969, 1971, 1973, 1975, 1981, 1983–1984
Linda Cheveski	Anne Cunningham	1960–1963, 1966–1968, 1984
Fred Gee	Fred Feast	1975–1984
Trevor Ogden	Jonathan Collins	1964, 1973, 1975, 1983–1984
Trevor Ogden	Don Hawkins	1964, 1973, 1975, 1983–1984
Billy Walker	Kenneth Farrington	1961–1964, 1969–1975, 1977–1979, 1984

=== Last appeared in 1985 ===
Character	Actor(s)	Duration
Elaine Webster	Judy Gridley	1984–1985
Sally Waterman	Vicki Chambers	1983–1985
Sue Clayton	Jane Hazlegrove	1985
Harry Clayton	Johnny Leeze	1985
Wilf Starkey	Jim Bywater	1985

=== Last appeared in 1986 ===
Character	Actor(s)	Duration
George Wardle	Ron Davies	1985–1986
Pauline Walsh	Patricia Ford	1985–1986
Jessica Midgeley	Christina Barryk	1986
Eddie Seddon	James Duggan	1986

=== Last appeared in 1987 ===
Character	Actor(s)	Duration
Ian Latimer	Michael Loney	1986–1987
Dulcie Froggatt	Marji Campi	1984–1987
Joan Lowther	June Broughton	1982–1983, 1985, 1987
Dr. Robert Lowther	David Scase	1983–1985, 1987
Eddie Yeats	Geoffrey Hughes	1974–1983, 1987
Hilda Ogden	Jean Alexander	1964–1987

=== Last appeared in 1988 ===
Character	Actor(s)	Duration
Harry Ashton	Keith Marsh	1988
Priscilla Millbanks	Nicola Stephenson	1988
Bob Statham	Michael Goldie	1983, 1987–1988
Gloria Todd	Sue Jenkins	1985–1988

=== Last appeared in 1989 ===
Character	Actor(s)	Duration
Brian Tilsley	Christopher Quinten	1978–1989
Sandra Stubbs	Sally Watts	1988–1989
Shirley Armitage	Lisa Lewis	1983–1989
Sam Tindall	Tom Mennard	1985–1989
Alan Bradley	Mark Eden	1986–1989
Les Smith	Crispin Letts	1988–1989

== 1990s ==
=== Last appeared in 1990 ===
Character	Actor(s)	Duration
Maurice Jones	Alan Moore	1989–1990
Josie Phillips	Siobhan Finneran	1989–1990
Eddie Ramsden	William Ivory	1989–1990
Renee Dodds	Christine Cox	1990
Tim Arden	John Flanagan	1990
Peter Ingram	Tony Osoba	1990
Nigel Ridley	John Basham	1989–1990
Tina Fowler	Michelle Holmes	1989–1990
Dave Barton	David Beckett	1990
Tom Casey	Edward Clayton	1989–1990
Jamie Ramsden	Alexander Graham	1989–1990
Marie Lancaster	Joy Blakeman	1990

=== Last appeared in 1991 ===
Character	Actor(s)	Duration
Terry Seymour	Cliff Howells	1991
Adrian Gosthorpe	Philip Brook	1991
Robert Weston	Philip Bretherton	1991
Joss Shackleton	Harold Goodwin	1991
Sandra Arden	Kathy Jamieson	1990–1991
Phil Jennings	Tommy Boyle	1990–1991
Winnie Dyson	June Ellis	1991
Barry Platt	John Jardine	1987, 1991
Barry Platt	Richard Conway	1987, 1991
Barbara Platt	Barbara Young	1991
Mark Casey	Stuart Wolfenden	1989–1991
Lynette Campion	Colette Stevenson	1991

=== Last appeared in 1992 ===
Character	Actor(s)	Duration
Victor Pendlebury	Christopher Coll	1982–1984, 1990–1992
Vanessa Morgan	Imogen Boorman	1992
Simon Beatty	Peter Gowen	1991–1992
Jackie Ingram	Shirin Taylor	1990–1992
Julie Dewhurst	Su Elliot	1991–1992
Ted Sullivan	William Russell	1992
Nigel Chadwick	Richard Redpath	1990, 1992
Ben Williams	Paul Warriner	1991–1992
Randolph Taylor	John Jardine	1990, 1992
Brenda Taylor	Marlene Sidaway	1990–1992
Kimberley Taylor	Suzanne Hall	1989–1992

=== Last appeared in 1993 ===
Character	Actor(s)	Duration
Lisa Duckworth	Caroline Milmoe	1992–1993
Sarah Brookes	Zulema Dene	1992–1993
Carmel Finnan	Catherine Cusack	1992–1993
Neil Mitchell	John Lloyd Fillingham	1992–1993
Doug Murray	Brian Hibbard	1992–1993
Vivian Barford	Paula Tilbrook	1991, 1993
Brendan Scott	Milton Johns	1991–1993
Debi Scott	Lesley Clare O'Neill	1993
Olive Clarke	Joan Scott	1993
Amy Nelson	Louise Duprey	1993
Jonathan Broughton	Tom Lewis	1993
Hazel Broughton	Fiona McArthur	1993
Kathleen Nelson	Alibe Parsons	1993
Craig Lee	Kieran O'Brien	1993
Hanif Ruparell	Ayub Khan-Din	1992–1993
Alison Rathbone	Rachel Smith	1993

=== Last appeared in 1994 ===
Character	Actor(s)	Duration
Joe Broughton	John Wheatley	1993–1994
Wayne Farrell	Ray Polhill	1992–1994
Ivy Tilsley	Lynne Perrie	1971–1972, 1974–1994
Janice Baker	Jane Hollowood	1994
Elaine Fenwick	Pippa Hinchley	1993–1994
Alex Christie	Gavin Richards	1994
Maggie Redman	Jill Kerman	1982–1984, 1986, 1991–1994
Tanya Pooley	Eva Pope	1993–1994
Paula Maxwell	Judy Brooke	1992, 1994
Charlie Whelan	John St Ryan	1993–1994

=== Last appeared in 1995 ===
Character	Actor(s)	Duration
Elsie Duckworth	Ursula Jones	1995
Clifford Duckworth	Dave King	1994–1995
Roger Crompton	Donald Gee	1994–1995
Cathy Power	Theresa Brindley	1994–1995
Samir Rachid	Al Nedjari	1994–1995
Harry Potts	Russell Dixon	1992–1993, 1995
Stella Rigby	Vivienne Ross	1985, 1989, 1992–1993, 1995
Steph Barnes	Amelia Bullmore	1990–1992, 1995
Rodney Bostock	Colin Prockter	1995
Leo Firman	John Elmes	1995
Reg Holdsworth	Ken Morley	1989–1995

=== Last appeared in 1996 ===
Character	Actor(s)	Duration
Alison Dunkley	Maggie Saunders	1995–1996
Jon Welch	David Michaels	1994–1996
Johnny Johnson	Vincenzo Ricotta	1990, 1996
Johnny Johnson	Robert Gwilym	1990, 1996
DC Cannon	Andrew Readman	1995–1996
Phyllis Pearce	Jill Summers	1982–1996
Nick Wilding	Mark Lindley	1991–1992, 1995–1996
Lily Dempsey	Thelma Ruby	1996
Josie Clarke	Ellie Haddington	1995–1996
Malcolm Fox	Glyn Pritchard	1996
Carl Armstrong	Jim Millea	1994, 1996
Maurice Preston	Seamus O'Neill	1996
Brian Dunkley	Benny Young	1995–1996
Carol Palmer	Beatrice Kelley	1996
Kelly Thomson	Sarah Simons	1996

=== Last appeared in 1997 ===
Character	Actor(s)	Duration
Billy Williams	Frank Mills	1995–1997
Joyce Smedley	Anita Carey	1996–1997
Gerry Turner	Keith Woodason	1997
Sue Jeffers	Romy Baskerville	1990–1994, 1996–1997
Becky Palmer	Emily Aston	1996–1997
Fraser Henderson	Glyn Grain	1996–1997
Derek Wilton	Peter Baldwin	1976–1979, 1982, 1984–1997
Claire Palmer	Maggie Norris	1996–1997
Wilf Gaskell	James Garbutt	1996–1997
Brad Armstrong	Caleb Flanagan	1997
Jamie Armstrong	Joseph Gilgun	1994–1997
Tricia Armstrong	Tracy Brabin	1994–1997
Ray Thorpe	Chris Walker	1997
Sean Skinner	Terence Hillyer	1994–1997
Elsie Seddon	Brenda Elder	1986, 1989–1991, 1997
Don Brennan	Geoffrey Hinsliff	1987–1997
Mavis Wilton	Thelma Barlow	1971–1997
Percy Sugden	Bill Waddington	1983–1997
George Dixon	Stephen MacKenna	1997
DS Dave O'Grady	Ronnie Leek	1997
Lee Middleton	Nicholas Bailey	1996–1997
Clive Middleton	Joe Speare	1996–1997
Alan McKenna	Glenn Hugill	1996–1997
Liam Shepherd	Andrew Knott	1997

=== Last appeared in 1998 ===
Character	Actor(s)	Duration
Richie Fitzgerald	Shaun Dooley	1997–1998
Rachel Forbes	Lisa Shingler	1997–1998
Log Thwaite	Zoë Henry	1998
Chris Collins	Matthew Marsden	1997–1998
Linda Lindsay	Margo Gunn	1997–1998
Angie Freeman	Deborah McAndrew	1990–1993, 1996–1998
Shannon Tattersall	Lucy Whipday	1997–1998
Maggie Veitch	Susan Tordoff	1998
Frances Stillman	Kim Vithana	1997–1998
Jon Lindsay	Owen Aaronovitch	1997–1998
Dr Cole	Laurence Kennedy	1998
Alison Oakley	Helen Swift	1989, 1998
Alison Oakley	Shelley Willetts	1989, 1998
Paul Fisher	Niven Boyd	1997–1998
Samantha Failsworth	Tina Hobley	1996–1998
Darren Whateley	Ian Aspinall	1989, 1998
Darren Whateley	Andy Robb	1989, 1998
Sandy Hunter	James Murray	1998
Eric Firman	Malcolm Terris	1994, 1998
Ida Clough	Helene Palmer	1978–1988, 1995–1998
Pam Middleton	Elizabeth Estensen	1996–1998
Anne Malone	Eve Steele	1995–1998
Dobber Dobson	John Donnelly	1998
Des Barnes	Philip Middlemiss	1990–1998
Malcolm Bradford	Ian Kershaw	1998
Malcolm Bradford	Derek Hicks	1998
Tony Horrocks	Lee Warburton	1995–1998
Ruth Morgan	Kirsten Parker	1998
Ben Andrews	Burn Gorman	1998
Zoe Tattersall	Joanne Froggatt	1997–1998
Vicky McDonald	Helen Warburton	1990–1996, 1998
Vicky McDonald	Chloe Newsome	1990–1996, 1998
Alec Gilroy	Roy Barraclough	1972, 1975, 1986–1992, 1995–1998

=== Last appeared in 1999 ===
Character	Actor(s)	Duration
Alf Roberts	Bryan Mosley	1961–1963, 1967, 1971–1999
Walter Byford	Vincent Worth	1999
Mrs Bennett	Claire Rushbrook	1999
Lorraine Brownlow	Holly Newman	1997–1999
Marcus Wrigley	Joseph Jacobs	1998–1999
Miranda Peters	Francesca Ryan	1998–1999
Aiden O'Donnell	Kieran Flynn	1998–1999
Julia Stone	Fiona Allen	1999
Greg Kelly	Stephen Billington	1998–1999
Eunice Gee	Meg Johnson	1981–1982, 1999
Charlie West	Keith Clifford	1997–1999
Owen Williams	Richard Harrington	1999
Sidney Templeton	Randal Herley	1999
Ravi Desai	Saeed Jaffrey	1999
Lee Sankey	Stephen Graham	1999
Judy Mallett	Gaynor Faye	1995–1999
Kathleen Gutteridge	Elizabeth Rider	1999
Melanie Tindel	Nicola Wheeler	1999
Harvey Nuttall	Tony Capstick	1995–1997, 1999
Maud Grimes	Elizabeth Bradley	1993–1999
Shane Mallett	Lee Hartney	1999
Ian Bentley	Jonathan Guy Lewis	1999
James Kitching	Nicholas Irons	1999
Sergei Kasparov	George Jackos	1999
Keith Hesketh	John Tordoff	1999

== 2000s ==
=== Last appeared in 2000 ===
Character	Actor(s)	Duration
Raquel Watts	Sarah Lancashire	1991–1996, 2000
Tom Ferguson	Tom Wisdom	1999–2000
Amy Goskirk	Jayne Ashbourne	2000
Clare Machin	Melanie Barker	2000
Bob Bradshaw	David Roper	2000
Neil Fearns	Paul Holowaty	2000
Nick Horrocks	William Ilkley	1997, 2000
Colin Barnes	Ian Embleton	1993, 1998–2000
DC Simon Cavanagh	John Griffin	2000
Colette Graham	Susanna Shelling	2000
Nita Desai	Rebecca Sarker	1999–2000
Kirsten Grant	Vicky Connett	2000
Jake Webster	Uncredited	2000
Alison Webster	Naomi Radcliffe	1998–2000
Joan Wakefield	Elizabeth Mansfield	1999–2000
Gwen Davies	Annie Hulley	1999–2000
Stuart Leigh	Tony Whittle	2000
Craig Brennan	Mark Simpkin	2000
Tim Munson	Andrew Grose	1999–2000
Jessica Lundy	Olwen May	1999–2000
Maya Desai	Indira Joshi	2000
Anna Wilson	Emma Parker	2000
Geoff Horton	Dicken Ashworth	1992–1994, 1996–1997, 2000
Doreen Horton	Annie Raitt	1992–1994, 1996–1997, 2000
Warren Shipley	Dean Worswick	2000
Jez Quigley	Lee Boardman	1997, 1999–2000
DI Reynolds	Blair Plant	1998–2000
Paula Shipley	Joanne Rowden	2000
Billy Mallett	Lewis Ablett	1998–2000
Becky Mallett	Megan Foster	1998–2000
Gary Mallett	Ian Mercer	1995–2000
Dean Sykes	Ciarán Griffiths	2000
Michael Wall	Dominic Rickhards	1998, 2000
Vinny Sorrell	James Gaddas	1999–2000
Debs Brownlow	Gabrielle Glaister	2000
Mrs Allen	Caroline Strong	2000
Stan Potter	Noddy Holder	2000
Connie Clayton	Susan Brown	1985, 2000
Connie Clayton	Irene Skillington	1985, 2000
Carol Delaney	Niamh Daly	1997–2000
Alice Watts	Annabelle Tarrant	2000
Rebecca Hopkins	Jill Halfpenny	1999–2000
Natalie Barnes	Denise Welch	1997–2000

=== Last appeared in 2001 ===
Character	Actor(s)	Duration
Glenn Middleham	Will Haigh	2000–2001
Pat Hegherty	Tony Barton	1998–2001
Susan Barlow	Katie Heanue	1965–1971, 1973–1974, 1979–1981, 1985–1987, 2001
Susan Barlow	Wendy Jane Walker	1965–1971, 1973–1974, 1979–1981, 1985–1987, 2001
Susan Barlow	Suzy Paterson	1965–1971, 1973–1974, 1979–1981, 1985–1987, 2001
Susan Barlow	Joanna Foster	1965–1971, 1973–1974, 1979–1981, 1985–1987, 2001
Isabel Stephens	Dilys Laye	2000–2001
Amanda Stephens	Martina Brown	2000–2001
Darren Michaels	Bruno Langley	2000–2001
Darren Michaels	Nicholas Zabel	2000–2001
Kieran Hargreaves	Robert Weatherby	1999–2001
DS Groves	Annie Fitzmaurice	2001
Danny Hargreaves	Richard Standing	1999–2001
Jenny Lyons	Natalie Lawless	2000–2001
Peter Hartnell	Eamonn Riley	2000–2001
Alma Halliwell	Amanda Barrie	1981–1982, 1988–2001
Frank O'Connor	Eamon Boland	2000–2001
Anthony Stephens	John Quayle	2000–2001
Gary Adams	Samuel Kane	2001
Harvey Reuben	Andrew Scarborough	2000–2001
Phil Simmonds	Jack Deam	2000–2001
Ruth Audsley	Maggie Fox	2001
Alex Swinton	Joe Simpson	2000–2001
Linda Baldwin	Jacqueline Pirie	1998–2001
Edna Miller	Joan Kempson	1998, 2000–2001
Iris Merry	Joan Kempson	2001
Rob Lucas	Mark Powley	2001
Ryan Sykes	Matthew Dunster	2000–2001
DC Ann Short	Jo-Anne Knowles	2001
Simon Green	Lee Battle	2000–2001
Jo Doyle	Neve Taylor	2001
Helen Cooper	Deborah Chad	2000–2001
Andrea Clayton	Caroline O'Neill	1985, 2000–2001
Jimmy Sykes	Danny Cunningham	2000–2001
Brenda Kelly	Rita May	2001
Stan Wagstaff	Jack Smethurst	2001
Sheila Hayes	Jeni Williams	2001
DS Wilson	Marcus Romer	2001

=== Last appeared in 2002 ===
Character	Actor(s)	Duration
Dennis Stringer	Charles Dale	2000–2002
Gill Gregory	Michelle Newell	2001–2002
Anita Scott	Nichola McAuliffe	2001–2002
Dave Turner	Stephen Bent	2002
Duggie Ferguson	John Bowe	1999–2002
Luke Ashton	John O'Neill	2001–2002
Arthur Watts	Kenneth Waller	1988, 1995, 2002
Arthur Watts	John Pickles	1988, 1995, 2002
Arthur Watts	Geoff Oldham	1988, 1995, 2002
Eunice Watts	Angela Rooks	1988, 1995, 2002
Eunice Watts	Georgine Anderson	1988, 1995, 2002
Sandra Milligan	Francesca Manning	2002
Hazel Wilding	Kazia Pelka	2002
John Wilding	John Bowler	2002
Charlie Ramsden	Clare McGlinn	2000–2002
Ray Sykes	Peter Guinness	2000, 2002
Karl Harper	Anthony Barclay	2001–2002
Stephanie Mills	Rebecca Atkinson	2002
Carol Mills	Collette Cooper	2002
Patricia Hillman	Annabelle Apsion	2002
Goran Milanovic	Matt Zarb	2002
Bobbi Lewis	Naomi Ryan	2000–2002
Sheila Cunningham	Rebecca Lamb	2002
Eve Elliott	Melanie Kilburn	2000–2002
Maurice Gregory	Keith Drinkel	2001–2002
Molly Hardcastle	Jacqueline Kingston	2000–2002
Sam Kingston	Scott Wright	2000–2002
Caroline Clegg	Elaine Donnelly	1982, 1995, 2002
Caroline Clegg	Sarah Thurstan	1982, 1995, 2002
Timothy Spencer	Jonathan Wright	2002
Lillian Spencer	Maureen Lipman	2002
Danielle Spencer	Kelly Wenham	2002
Jules Robinson	Rebecca Ritters	2002
Geena Gregory	Jennifer James	2000–2002
Miss Johnson	Barbara Dryhurst	2001–2002
Vernon Bradshaw	Antony Bessick	2001–2002
Alex Jordan	Simon Lenagan	2002
Vikram Desai	Chris Bisson	1999–2002

=== Last appeared in 2003 ===
Character	Actor(s)	Duration
Maxine Peacock	Tracy Shaw	1995–2003
DS Tony Trafford	Justin Burrows	2001–2003
Bob Critchley	Glenn Cunningham	2002–2003
Derek Heavey	Richard Albrecht	1999, 2002–2003
John Arnley	Paul Warriner	2002–2003
DC Dave Brett	Paul Gabriel	2002–2003
Aiden Critchley	Dean Ashton	2002–2003
Naveen Alahan	Parvez Qadir	2002–2003
Ernie Wagstaff	Stuart Golland	2001, 2003
Joe Carter	Jonathan Wrather	2002–2003
Merle Jackson	Nicky Ladanowski	2003
Ben Watts	Stephen Collins	2001–2003
Emma Watts	Angela Lonsdale	2000–2003
Curly Watts	Kevin Kennedy	1983–2003
Mick Hopwood	Ian Gain	2002–2003
Marion Stowe	Paula Simms	2000–2003
Maz O'Loughlin	Emma Rydal	2003
Wally Bannister	Bernard Cribbins	2003
Mandy Pearce	Kate Faulkner	2003
Lucy Barlow	Katy Carmichael	2002–2003
Cecil Newton	Kenneth Alan Taylor	1987–1988, 1990, 2003
Cecil Newton	George Baker	1987–1988, 1990, 2003
Laurie Dyson	Andrew Dunn	2003
Bet Lynch	Julie Goodyear	1966, 1970–1995, 2002–2003

=== Last appeared in 2004 ===
Character	Actor(s)	Duration
Brenda Fearns	Julia Deakin	2003–2004
Eric Garside	Peter Kay	2004
Ranjiv Alahan	Raad Rawi	2001, 2004
Ranjiv Alahan	Madhav Sharma	2001, 2004
Dennis Stokes	Duncan Preston	2004
Billy Platt	Uncredited	2004
Harry Flagg	Iain Rogerson	2002–2004
Karl Foster	Chris Finch	2003–2004
Urmila Alahan	Souad Faress	2001, 2004
Urmila Alahan	Jamila Massey	2001, 2004
Doreen Heavey	Prunella Gee	1999, 2002–2004
Suresh Parekh	Kaleem Janjua	2001, 2004
Suresh Parekh	Ash Varrez	2001, 2004
Maya Sharma	Sasha Behar	2003–2004
Mena Parekh	Leena Dhingra	2001, 2004
Boris Weaver	Mark Hallett	1999–2004
Karen McDonald	Suranne Jones	2000–2004

=== Last appeared in 2005 ===
Character	Actor(s)	Duration
Laurie Johnstone	Johnny Leeze	2005
Patrick Tussell	Trevor Dwyer-Lynch	2002–2005
Tommy Harris	Thomas Craig	2002–2005
Sonia Marshall	Tina Gambe	2003–2005
Jean Harris	Sue Wallace	2005
Ray Langton	Neville Buswell	1966, 1968–1978, 2005
Katy Harris	Lucy-Jo Hudson	2002–2005
Angela Harris	Kathryn Hunt	2002–2005
Mel Hutchwright	Ian McKellen	2005
Louise Hazel	Nora Jane Noone	2005
Lena Thislewood	Maria Charles	2005
Tim White	Edward MacLiam	2005
Angela Hawthorne	Diane Fletcher	1994–1995, 2005
Zack	Ralph Ineson	2005
Billy Brown	Jay Martin	2005
Scooter Makuna	Sushil Chudasama	2005
Robyn	Clare Calbraith	2005
Candice Stowe	Nikki Sanderson	1999–2005
Nicolette Seddon	Natalie Richards	2005
Jimmy Clayton	David Crellin	2005

=== Last appeared in 2006 ===
Character	Actor(s)	Duration
Carol Baldwin	Lynne Pearson	2005–2006
Jessie Jackson	Nailah Cumberbatch	2005–2006
Jayesh Parekh	Pal Aron	2001, 2004–2006
Jayesh Parekh	Ace Bhatti	2001, 2004–2006
Stacy "Orchid" Hilton	Casey-Lee Jolleys	2004, 2006
Jo	Emma Pike	2006
Eric Talford	Tony Slattery	2005–2006
Clifford Ford	Mike Walling	2006
Ed Jackson	Dave Parke	1978, 2005–2006
Ed Jackson	Chris Walker	1978, 2005–2006
Phil Nail	Clive Russell	2005–2006
Mike Baldwin	Johnny Briggs	1976–2006
Mark Redman	Thomas Hawkeswood	1983–1984, 1986, 1991–1994, 1996, 1999–2001, 2006
Mark Redman	Christopher Oakes	1983–1984, 1986, 1991–1994, 1996, 1999–2001, 2006
Mark Redman	Michael Bolstridge	1983–1984, 1986, 1991–1994, 1996, 1999–2001, 2006
Mark Redman	Christopher Cook	1983–1984, 1986, 1991–1994, 1996, 1999–2001, 2006
Mark Redman	Paul Fox	1983–1984, 1986, 1991–1994, 1996, 1999–2001, 2006
Penny King	Pauline Fleming	2003–2006
Ravinder Kalirai	Mina Anwar	2005–2006
Ronnie Clayton	Emma Stansfield	2005–2006
Brian Tully	Tim Healy	2006
Maureen Tully	Susan Brown	2006
Matt Ramsden	Stephen Beckett	2000–2002, 2006
Diggory Compton	Eric Potts	2005–2006
Nathan Harding	Ray Fearon	2005–2006
Christopher Pitcher	Michael Dixon	2006
Keith Appleyard	Ian Redford	2005–2006
Cameron McIntyre	Ryan Cook	2006
Shelley Unwin	Sally Lindsay	2001–2006
Fred Elliott	John Savident	1994–2006
Craig Harris	Richard Fleeshman	2002–2006
Beryl Peacock	Anny Tobin	1999, 2002–2004, 2006
Warren Baldwin	Danny Young	2004–2006
Viv Baldwin	Patricia Brake	2005–2006
Maureen Webster	Sherrie Hewson	1993–1997, 2006
Frankie Baldwin	Debra Stephenson	2004–2006
Danny Baldwin	Bradley Walsh	2004–2006

=== Last appeared in 2007 ===
Character	Actor(s)	Duration
Charlie Stubbs	Bill Ward	2003–2007
Kasia Barowicz	Irena Rodic	2007
Holly Grimshaw	Amelia Caudwell	2006–2007
Les Battersby	Bruce Jones	1997–2007
Paul Connor	Sean Gallagher	2006–2007
Derek	David Hounslow	2007
Yana Lumb	Jayne Bickerton	2004–2007
Joanne Jackson	Zaraah Abrahams	2005–2007
Pat Stanaway	Sean Hughes	2007
Neville Hawthorne	Mark Chatterton	1986, 2005, 2007
Casey Carswell	Zoë Henry	2007
Frank Nicholls	Keith Clifford	2007
Wilfred Morton	Rodney Litchfield	2007
Jodie Morton	Samantha Seager	2007
George Trench	Keith Barron	2007
Ivor Priestley	Paul Copley	2007
Doreen Fenwick	Barbara Young	2007
Lindsey Gordon	Susie Amy	2007

=== Last appeared in 2008 ===
Character	Actor(s)	Duration
Luigi	Chris Hannon	2007–2008
Lauren Wilson	Lucy Evans	2007–2008
Nick Neeson	Robert Horwell	2007–2008
Paul Connor Jr.	Uncredited	2008
Marian Lund	Patricia Heneghan	1961, 2008
Marian Lund	Linda Marlowe	1961, 2008
DS Phil Campbell	Gary Cargill	2006–2008
Abi Sharpe	Rachael Elizabeth	2007–2008
Clarissa Mason	Alexandra Boyd	2008
Harry Mason	Jack Ellis	2007–2008
Kayleigh Morton	Jessica Barden	2007–2008
Jerry Morton	Michael Starke	2007–2008
Finlay Bryant	Ramone Quinn	2007–2008
Mel Morton	Emma Edmondson	2007–2008
Roger Stiles	Andrew Dunn	2007–2008
Liam Connor	Rob James-Collier	2006–2008
Saj	Junade Khan	2008
Vernon Tomlin	Ian Reddington	2005–2008
Dan Mason	Matthew Crompton	2007–2008
Prem Mandal	Madhav Sharma	2008
Nina Mandal	Harvey Virdi	2008
Pat Gordon	Jamie Lee	2008

=== Last appeared in 2009 ===
Character	Actor(s)	Duration
Mike Scott	Anthony Bessick	2008–2009
Jed Stone	Kenneth Cope	1961–1963, 1966, 2008–2009
Wiki Dankowska	Wanda Opalinska	2007–2009
Christina	Sarah-Jayne Steed	2009
Kenzie Judd	Jack Cooper	2008–2009
Lisa Dalton	Ruth Alexandra Rubin	2008–2009
Tom Kerrigan	Philip McGinley	2008–2009
Justin Turner	Ralph Gassmann	2009
Tara Mandal	Ayesha Dharker	2008–2009
DC Weller	Caroline Paterson	2008–2009
Colin Grimshaw	Edward de Souza	2008–2009
Phil Hardwick	Richard Sargent	2007–2009
Paula Carp	Sharon Duce	2009
Poppy Morales	Sophiya Haque	2008–2009
Vanessa	Gabrielle Drake	2009
Gilbert	John Owens	2009
Ross	Lee Oakes	2009
Dr Patel	Josephine Lloyd-Welcome	2004, 2009
Len Windass	Conor Ryan	2008–2009
Andy McDonald	Nicholas Cochrane	1989–1997, 2000, 2004, 2009
Ramsay Clegg	Andrew Sachs	2009
Naomi Collins	Andrea Lowe	2009
Slug	Marshall Lancaster	2006–2007, 2009
Mitch	Marcquelle Ward	2009
DC Hooch	Dominic Carter	2008–2009
Leon	Andrew Langtree	2009
Sheila Wheeler	Janice Connolly	2009
Darryl Morton	Jonathan Dixon	2007–2009
Umed Alahan	Harish Patel	2009
Luke Strong	Craig Kelly	2009
Jimmy Dockerson	Robert Beck	2008–2009
Minnie Chandra	Poppy Jhakra	2008–2009
Joan	Maggie Tagney	2009
Horace Steel	Robert Maxfield	2009
Blanche Hunt	Patricia Cutts	1974–1978, 1981, 1996–2009
Blanche Hunt	Maggie Jones	1974–1978, 1981, 1996–2009
Bernie Sayers	Jennifer Hennessy	2009
Zoe	Kirsty-Leigh Porter	2009
Ben Richardson	Lucien Laviscount	2009
Jake Harman	Kenny Doughty	2009

== 2010s ==
=== Last appeared in 2010 ===
Character	Actor(s)	Duration
Ted Page	Michael Byrne	2008–2010
Enid Crump	June Broughton	2010
Joe McIntyre	Reece Dinsdale	2008–2010
Matt Davis	Christopher Colquhoun	2009–2010
Eve Wilson	Sabina Franklyn	2009–2010
George Wilson	Anthony Valentine	2009–2010
Jackie Dobbs	Margi Clarke	1998–1999, 2008–2010
Kelly Crabtree	Tupele Dorgu	2004–2010
Mark Kenworthy	Jason Furnival	2010
Jane Kenworthy	Annie Fitzmaurice	2010
Dave Bonsall	Kieran Cunningham	2010
May Penn	June Whitfield	2010
Archie Shuttleworth	Roy Hudd	2002–2003, 2006, 2010
Teresa Bryant	Karen Henthorn	2007–2010
Robbie Sloan	James Fleet	2010
Tony Gordon	Gray O'Brien	2007–2010
Lyn Fullwood	Susan McArdle	2010
DS Max Carr	Joe Duttine	2010
Paul Stokes	Mark Dexter	2010
Ben Fielding	Dominic Gately	2010
Colin Fishwick	David Crellin	2010
Lydia Radcliffe	Lysette Anthony	2010
Luke "Quinny" Quinn	Steve Bell	2010
Lawrence Cunningham	Linus Roache	2010
Lynn Clucus	Jane Cunliffe	2010
Dawn Coghill	Emma Hartley-Miller	2010
Vinnie Powers	Ian Dunn	2009–2010
Yvonne Casey	Yvonne O'Grady	2004, 2006–2007, 2010
Vera Duckworth	Liz Dawn	1974, 1976–2008, 2010
Jack Duckworth	Bill Tarmey	1979, 1981–2010
Molly Dobbs	Vicky Binns	2005–2010
Ashley Peacock	Steven Arnold	1995–2010
Charlotte Hoyle	Becky Hindley	2010
Connie Rathbone	Rita May	2009–2010
Rick Peach	Nick Caldecott	2009–2010

=== Last appeared in 2011 ===
Character	Actor(s)	Duration
Joy Fishwick	Doreen Mantle	2010–2011
DC Moore	Pooja Shah	2011
Joshua Peacock	Brandon Jackson	2002–2011
Joshua Peacock	Benjamin Beresford	2002–2011
Freddie Peacock	Jack and Jake Rogers	2006–2011
Freddie Peacock	Dylan and Hayden Whitbread	2006–2011
Freddie Peacock	Lewis and Niall Beresford	2006–2011
Claire Peacock	Julia Haworth	2003–2011
Billy Matheson	Neil Bell	2011
Trevor Dean	Steve Jackson	2010–2011
Janice Battersby	Vicky Entwistle	1997–2011
Richard Willmore	Oliver Beamish	1992–1994, 2011
Hilary Pugsley	Caroline Pegg	2010–2011
Jamie Baldwin	Rupert Hill	2004–2008, 2011
Eddie Windass	Steve Huison	2008–2011
Betty Williams	Betty Driver	1969–2011
Roberta Kite	Helen Griffin	2011
Xin Proctor	Elizabeth Tan	2011
Graeme Proctor	Craig Gazey	2008–2011
Upma Parekh	Jamila Massey	2010–2011
Grishma Parekh	Indira Joshi	2010–2011
Suzanne Holbrook	Olivia Carruthers	2011
James Cunningham	James Roache	2010–2011
Marc Selby	Andrew Hall	2011
Leon Southam	Colin Parry	2011
Ruth Walsh	Rebecca Callard	2011
Ginny Portis	Ashley McGuire	2011
Sam Foster	Paul Clayton	2011
George Eastham	Kevin McGowan	2011
DC Joyce Malone	Olwen May	2011
Alan Hoyle	John Woodvine	2010–2011
Alan Hoyle	Michael McStay	2010–2011
Dorothy Hoyle	Jean Fergusson	2010–2011
Mr Westmore	Dominic Geraghty	2011
DS Redfern	Paul Warriner	2010–2011
Jeff Cullen	Steven Houghton	2011
Russ Gray	Finton Flynn	2010–2011
Cheryl Gray	Holly Quin-Ankrah	2010–2011
Chris Gray	Will Thorp	2010–2011
Ciaran McCarthy	Keith Duffy	2002–2005, 2010–2011
Jonno Richardson	David Sterne	2011
Will	Chris Brazier	2011
Bill Webster	Peter Armitage	1984–1985, 1995–1997, 2006–2011
Janet Powers	Carol Starks	2010–2011
Sian Powers	Sacha Parkinson	2009–2011

=== Last appeared in 2012 ===
Character	Actor(s)	Duration
Becky McDonald	Katherine Kelly	2006–2012
Danny Stratton	Jeremy Sheffield	2011–2012
Billy Stratton	Wade Sayers	2012
Robert Millward	Michael Maloney	2012
Milton Fanshaw	Robert Vaughn	2012
Jenny Sumner	Niky Wardley	2012
Frank Foster	Andrew Lancel	2011–2012
Jennifer Lingwood	Lisa Bowerman	2011–2012
DS Nash	Antony Byrne	2012
Anne Foster	Gwen Taylor	2011–2012
Amber Kalirai	Nikki Patel	2005–2009, 2011–2012
Gordon Clegg	Bill Kenwright	1968–1969, 1974–1976, 1982, 1995, 2002, 2004, 2012
Gordon Clegg	Geoffrey Leesley	1968–1969, 1974–1976, 1982, 1995, 2002, 2004, 2012
Pam Hobsworth	Kate Anthony	2008–2012
Lesley Kershaw	Judy Holt	2011–2012
Terry Duckworth	Nigel Pivaro	1983–1988, 1992–1993, 1996–1997, 1999–2002, 2008, 2012
Barry Hawkins	James Foster	2012
Jonny Smith	Greg Patmore	2012
Lindsay Hayward	Eleni Foskett	2012
Edwin Soames	David Lonsdale	2012
Penny Thornley	Sue Hanson	2012
Aiden Lester	Toby Sawyer	2012
Carole Evans	Debbie Arnold	2012
Malcolm Lagg	Robert Fyfe	2012
Ron Dent	Stephen Greif	2012
Janet Dent	Linda Clark	2012

=== Last appeared in 2013 ===
Character	Actor(s)	Duration
Mr Phillips	Sam Bond	2010, 2012–2013
Eric Babbage	Timothy West	2013
Megan Smithson	Amy Dolan	2013
Toni Griffiths	Tara Moran	2013
Alison Soames	Dawn Hope	2012–2013
Stan Whitmore	David Williams	2013
Kirsty Soames	Natalie Gumede	2011–2013
Sunita Alahan	Shobna Gulati	2001–2006, 2009–2013
Matt Carter	Oliver Mellor	2010–2013
Sylvia Goodwin	Stephanie Cole	2011–2013
PC Yates	Simon Hayward	2010–2013
Mandy Kamara	Pamela Nomvete	2012–2013
Paul Kershaw	Tony Hirst	2010–2013
Karl Munro	John Michie	2011–2013
Tommy Duckworth	Darryl Edwards	1992–1997, 2000, 2011–2013
Tommy Duckworth	Joseph Aston	1992–1997, 2000, 2011–2013
Tommy Duckworth	Chris Fountain	1992–1997, 2000, 2011–2013
Jeff Rayner	Jim Millea	2013
Jane Rayner	Heather Bleasdale	2013
Grace Piper	Ella-Grace Gregoire	2013
Christian Gatley	Andrew Turner	2007, 2013

=== Last appeared in 2014 ===
Character	Actor(s)	Duration
Hayley Cropper	Julie Hesmondhalgh	1998–2014
Ritchie de Vries	Robin Askwith	2013–2014
Gloria Price	Sue Johnston	2012–2014
Stella Price	Michelle Collins	2011–2014
Valerie Phelan	Caroline Berry	2013–2014
Sid Altree	Michael J. Jackson	2012–2014
Ann McIntyre	Susan Mitchell	2008, 2014
Ann McIntyre	Lorraine Hodgson	2008, 2014
Tina McIntyre	Michelle Keegan	2008–2014
Marcus Dent	Charlie Condou	2007–2008, 2011–2014
Dennis Tanner	Philip Lowrie	1960–1968, 2011–2014
Jenna Kamara	Krissi Bohn	2012–2014
Dean Upton	Justin Moorhouse	2014
Neil Beckett	William Travis	2014
Deirdre Barlow	Anne Kirkbride	1972–2014
Eugene Clelland	Fine Time Fontayne	2014
Cilla Battersby-Brown	Wendi Peters	2003–2007, 2014

=== Last appeared in 2015 ===
Character	Actor(s)	Duration
Eric Sutherland	Steve Money	2000–2001, 2005, 2008, 2015
Dotty Sutherland	Susie Baxter	2000, 2005, 2008, 2015
Hamish Young	James Redmond	2015
Gavin Rodwell	Mark Holgate	2015
Katy Armstrong	Georgia May Foote	2010–2015
Helen Connor	Sorcha Cusack	2008–2009, 2015
Helen Connor	Dearbhla Molloy	2008–2009, 2015
Barry Connor	Frank Grimes	2008–2009, 2013, 2015
Kal Nazir	Jimi Mistry	2013–2015
Maddie Heath	Amy James-Kelly	2013–2015
Adrian Mortimer	Mark Moraghan	2015
Josie Hodge	Una McNulty	2015
Greig Hodge	Stuart Wolfenden	2015
Talisa Grady	Samantha Power	2015
Bev Unwin	Susie Blake	2003–2006, 2015
Dan Jones	Andrew Paul	2015
Joni Preston	Sarah Harding	2015
Dougie Ryan	Paddy McGuinness	2015
Callum Logan	Sean Ward	2014–2015
Andrea Beckett	Hayley Tamaddon	2013–2015
Lloyd Mullaney	Craig Charles	2005–2015
Tony Stewart	Alan Igbon	2003, 2014–2015
Tony Stewart	Terence Maynard	2003, 2014–2015

=== Last appeared in 2016 ===
Character	Actor(s)	Duration
Jamie Bowman	James Atherton	2015–2016
Brendan Finch	Ted Robbins	2015–2016
Richie O'Driscoll	James Midgley	2015–2016
Julia O'Driscoll	Malgorzata Klara	2015–2016
Marta Zarek	Edyta Budnik	2016
Sam Trenton	Joseph Taylor	2016
Chris Trenton	Stephen Casey	2016
Caitlin Ryan	Eve Gordon	2015–2016
Kylie Platt	Paula Lane	2010–2016
Darryl Perkins	Paul Loughran	2016
Lauren	Shannon Flynn	2016
Sharif Nazir	Marc Anwar	2014–2016
Sonia Rahman	Sudha Bhuchar	2016
Michael Rodwell	Les Dennis	2014–2016
Caz Hammond	Rhea Bailey	2015–2016
Nessa Warner	Sadie Shimmin	2015–2016

=== Last appeared in 2017 ===
Character	Actor(s)	Duration
Trina Robson	Kerry Bennett	2017
Toby Chapman	Andrew Dowbiggin	2016–2017
Freddie Smith	Derek Griffiths	2016–2017
Chloe Tipton	Jo-Anne Knowles	2017
Leah Buckley	Molly McGlynn	2017
Philip Wheeler	Simon Delaney	2017
Denise Osbourne	Denise Black	1992–1997, 2007, 2017
Drew Spellman	Tom Godwin	2017
Lara Cutler	Niamh Blackshaw	2017
Erica Holroyd	Claire King	2014–2017
Scott	Christopher Goh	2017
Will Chatterton	Leon Ockenden	2016–2017
Mel Maguire	Sonia Ibrahim	2016–2017
Dane Hibbs	Simon Naylor	2017
Andy Carver	Oliver Farnworth	2014–2017
Colin Callen	Jim Moir	2017
Chris Anderton	Oliver Walker	2017
Matthew Singh	Peter Singh	2015–2017

=== Last appeared in 2018 ===
Character	Actor(s)	Duration
Matt Luscombe	Sebastian Shaw	2017–2018
Luke Britton	Dean Fagan	2014–2018
Steph Britton	Tisha Merry	2013–2018
Sam Bryce	Amy Dolan	2018
Geraldine Spellman	Lynne Verrall	2017–2018
Lee Mayhew	Richard Crehan	2016, 2018
Wendy Neeson	Jane Slavin	2007–2008, 2018
Martin Platt	Sean Wilson	1985–2005, 2018
DC Yates	Kent Riley	2018
Dec Lonsdale	Josh Harper	2018
Pat Phelan	Connor McIntyre	2013–2014, 2016–2018
Anna Windass	Debbie Rush	2008–2018
Rosemary Piper	Sophie Thompson	2018
Rosie Webster	Emma Collinge	1990–2012, 2017–2018
Rosie Webster	Helen Flanagan	1990–2012, 2017–2018
Kim Vaughan	Tom Shaw	2017–2018
Sharon Butterlee	Natalie Burt	2018
Flora McArdle	Eileen Davies	2017–2018
Marsha Westbrook	Joanne Mitchell	2018
Neil Clifton	Ben Cartwright	2017–2018
Kayla Clifton	Mollie Winnard	2018
Hassan Habeeb	Kriss Dosanjh	2016, 2018
Darren Dobbs	James McMartin	1999, 2018
Darren Dobbs	Stephen Donald	1999, 2018
Cormac Truman	Joe Mallalieu	2018
Ronan Truman	Colin Tierney	2017–2018
Ronan Truman	Alan McKenna	2017–2018
Hannah Gilmore	Hannah Ellis Ryan	2018
Jim McDonald	Charles Lawson	1989–2000, 2003–2005, 2007–2011, 2014, 2018
Phil Gillespie	Tom Turner	2018

=== Last appeared in 2019 ===
Character	Actor(s)	Duration
Lewis Archer	Nigel Havers	2009–2010, 2012–2013, 2018–2019
Jude Appleton	Paddy Wallace	2016–2019
George Appleton	Romeo Cheetham-Karcz	2017–2019
Angie Appleton	Victoria Ekanoye	2017–2019
Olivia Radfield	Arianna Ajtar	2018–2019
May Radfield	Helene Maksoud	2019
Duncan Radfield	Nicholas Gleaves	2018–2019
Elsa Tilsley	Kelly Harrison	2018–2019
Zack Rubinstein	Alfie and Mikey Fletcher	2018–2019
Zack Rubinstein	Phoenix and Sebastian Winnington	2018–2019
Nicola Rubinstein	Nicola Thorp	2017–2019
Macca Hibbs	Gareth Berliner	2014–2017, 2019
James Woodgate	James Butler	2019
Andrea Abruzzi	Luca Malacrino	2019
Rana Habeeb	Bhavna Limbachia	2016–2019
Anton Radkov	Leart Dokle	2019
Lolly	Katherine Pearce	2019
Gina Seddon	Julie Foy	1988–1989, 2017–2019
Gina Seddon	Connie Hyde	1988–1989, 2017–2019
Bernard Finch	Larry Waller	2019
Dave	Perry Jaques	2019
Natalie Watkins	Cassie Bradley	2019
Alice Parrott	Angela Curran	2019
Wayne Hayes	Gary Damer	2000–2001, 2019
Wayne Hayes	Adam Barlow	2000–2001, 2019
Imogen Pascoe	Melissa Johns	2017–2019
John Brooker	Noel White	2019
Fiona Middleton	Angela Griffin	1992–1998, 2019
Jed Moss	Branwell Donaghey	2019
Jan Lozinski	Piotr Baumann	2019
Kate Connor	Faye Brookes	2015–2019
Sophie Webster	Ashleigh Middleton	1994–2019
Sophie Webster	Emma Woodward	1994–2019
Sophie Webster	Brooke Vincent	1994–2019
Emily Bishop	Eileen Derbyshire	1960–2016, 2019
Jessica Hadaway	Wendy Albiston	2019
Tez Collier	Nick Judge	2019
Abe Crowley	Liam Boyle	2019
Nancy Tinker	Kate Fitzgerald	2015, 2018–2019
Arlene Tinker	Alison Burrows	2015, 2018–2019
Morgan Middleton	Connor Chatburn	1998, 2019
Morgan Middleton	Corey Weekes	1998, 2019
DS MacKinnon	Sandra Huggett	2016–2019
Richard Lucas	Paul Bown	2019
Tyler Jefferies	Will Barnett	2018–2019
Derek Milligan	Craig Els	2019
Robert Preston	Julian Kay	1996, 1999, 2003, 2015–2019
Robert Preston	Tristan Gemmill	1996, 1999, 2003, 2015–2019
Sonny Jefferies	Uncredited	2019
Vicky Jefferies	Kerri Quinn	2018–2019
Michelle Connor	Kym Marsh	2006–2019

== 2020s ==
=== Last appeared in 2020 ===
Character	Actor(s)	Duration
Josh Tucker	Ryan Clayton	2018–2020
Moira Pollock	Louiza Patikas	2017–2020
Kel Hinchley	Joseph Alessi	2019–2020
Marion Logan	Susan Cookson	2015–2016, 2019–2020
Marion Logan	Kerry Peers	2015–2016, 2019–2020
Disco Des	John Henshaw	2020
Jade Rowan	Lottie Henshall	2019–2020
Sinead Tinker	Katie McGlynn	2013–2020
Ali Neeson	Dario Coates	2007–2008, 2018–2020
Ali Neeson	James Burrows	2007–2008, 2018–2020
Paula Martin	Stirling Gallacher	2018–2020
Liz McDonald	Beverley Callard	1989–1998, 2000–2001, 2003–2011, 2013–2020
Norris Cole	Malcolm Hebden	1994–1997, 1999–2017, 2019–2020
Scott Emberton	Tom Roberts	2020
Oliver Battersby	Toby Catley	2017–2020
Oliver Battersby	Emmanuel and Jeremiah Cheetham	2017–2020

=== Last appeared in 2021 ===
Character	Actor(s)	Duration
Arthur Medwin	Paul Copley	2020–2021
Mick Chaney	Neil Bell	2020–2021
Lucas Kempton	Glen Wallace	2021
DC Glynn	Philip Rowson	2010, 2017, 2021
Carol Hill	Emma Hartley-Miller	2018, 2021
Sharon Bentley	Tracie Bennett	1982–1984, 1999, 2021
Kat Bailey	Melissa James	2021
Rachel Healy	Verity Henry	2019, 2021
Jay Dowling	Mason Hey	2021
Eli Higginson	Liam Scholes	2021
Freda Burgess	Ali Briggs	2005–2006, 2009–2010, 2019–2021
Aidan Connor	Shayne Ward	2015–2018, 2021
Johnny Connor	Richard Hawley	2015–2021
Natasha Blakeman	Rachel Leskovac	2008–2010, 2020–2021
Corey Brent	Maximus Evans	2019–2021
Sabeen Habeeb	Zora Bishop	2018, 2021
Sabeen Habeeb	Anita Jay	2018, 2021
Danny Tomlinson	Dylan Brady	2020–2021
Darcy Haywood	Lily-Rae Doyle	2021
Isla Haywood	Gemma Oaten	2021
Tony Haywood	Greg Snowden	2021
Ray Crosby	Mark Frost	2019–2021
DS Abney	Fiona Skinner	2020–2021
Hashim Elamin	Vincent Ebrahim	2021
Finn Chambers	Joshua Leavy	2021
Lexi Franklin	Jasmine Fish	2017–2021
Charlie Franklin	Jacob Fish	2017–2021
Curtis Delamere	Sam Retford	2021
Neville Delamere	Mark Cameron	2021

=== Last appeared in 2022 ===
Character	Actor(s)	Duration
Ted Spear	Duggie Brown	2022
Clint Stubbins	Fergus O'Donnell	2021–2022
Grace Vickers	Kate Spencer	2019–2022
Lydia Chambers	Rebecca Ryan	2021–2022
Jon Spear	Jordan Ford Silver	2022
Emma Brooker	Alexandra Mardell	2018–2022
Laura Neelan	Kel Allen	2020–2022
Elsie	Arabella Berkeley	2021–2022
Ben Chancellor	Jon-Paul Bell	2022
Imran Habeeb	Charlie De Melo	2017–2022
Cathy Matthews	Melanie Hill	2015–2022
Maisie Wheatley	Lucia Aliu	2022
Camilla Perrin	Louise Marwood	2022
Mimi Halliday	Margot Leicester	2021–2022
Frank Bardsley	Simon O'Brien	2022
Phill Whittaker	Jamie Kenna	2021–2022
Claudia Colby	Rula Lenska	2009–2011, 2018–2022
Geoff Metcalfe	Ian Bartholomew	2018–2022
Saira Habeeb	Kim Vithana	2016–2019, 2022
Rick Neelan	Greg Wood	2009–2010, 2012, 2019, 2022
Kelly Neelan	Millie Gibson	2019–2022
Lucy Woodrow	Lynda Rooke	2022
Fern Lindon	Gabrielle Glaister	2022
Wendy Crozier	Roberta Kerr	1989–1990, 2012, 2022
Martha Fraser	Stephanie Beacham	2009, 2022

=== Last appeared in 2023 ===
Character	Actor(s)	Duration
Ollie Deacon	Carl Blakeley	2022–2023
Jacob Hay	Jack James Ryan	2021–2023
John Stape	Graeme Hawley	2007–2011, 2022–2023
PC Burke	Giles Ford	2009–2018, 2022–2023
Esther Hargrave	Vanessa Hehir	2022–2023
Blake Myers	Adam Little	2022–2023
Marrium Nazir	Kiran Landa	2021–2023
Zeedan Nazir	Qasim Akhtar	2014–2018, 2021–2023
Daryan Zahawi	Twana Omer	2022–2023
Leo Thompkins	Joe Frost	2021–2023
Teddy Thompkins	Grant Burgin	2022–2023
Bridget Woodrow	Beth Vyse	2022–2023
Rufus Donahue	Steven Meo	2023
Faye Windass	Ellie Leach	2011–2023
Jackson Hodge	Rhys Cadman	2015, 2017, 2023
Jackson Hodge	Joseph William Evans	2015, 2017, 2023
Miley Hodge	Erin, Eilah and Elsie Halliwell	2015, 2017, 2023
Miley Hodge	Frankie-Jae Simmonds	2015, 2017, 2023
Karen Rutherford	Lynn Kennedy	2023
Aggie Bailey	Lorna Laidlaw	2019–2023
Yvette Leighton	Arabella Weir	2023
Aaron Sandford	James Craven	2022–2023
Gabrielle Reid	Helene Maksoud	2022–2023
Spider Nugent	Martin Hancock	1997–2001, 2003, 2022–2023
Isabella Benvenuti	Flaminia Cinque	2023
Shelly Rossington	Natalie Amber	2023
Philip Newton	Malcolm Scates	2003, 2023
Philip Newton	Bruce McGregor	2003, 2023
Henry Newton	George Banks	2017–2018, 2023
Ange Carlisle	Nicole Barber-Lane	2023
PC Carson	Amy Searles	2005–2014, 2017–2023
Stephen Reid	Todd Boyce	1996–1997, 2007, 2022–2023
Justin Rutherford	Andrew Still	2022–2023
Elaine Jones	Paula Wilcox	2020–2023
Courtney Vance	Stephanie Davis	2023
Darren Vance	Ryan Early	2023
Dan Morris	George Martin	2023
Isla Gibbs	Emily Dowson	2023
Big Garth	Victor McGuire	2019, 2023
Crystal Hyde	Erin Austen	2023
Tony Byrne	Sean Cernow	2023
Peter Barlow	Robert Heanue	1965–1971, 1973–1975, 1977–1978, 1986, 2000–2003, 2007–2023
Peter Barlow	Chris Dormer	1965–1971, 1973–1975, 1977–1978, 1986, 2000–2003, 2007–2023
Peter Barlow	Mark Duncan	1965–1971, 1973–1975, 1977–1978, 1986, 2000–2003, 2007–2023
Peter Barlow	Linus Roache	1965–1971, 1973–1975, 1977–1978, 1986, 2000–2003, 2007–2023
Peter Barlow	Joseph McKenner	1965–1971, 1973–1975, 1977–1978, 1986, 2000–2003, 2007–2023
Peter Barlow	David Lonsdale	1965–1971, 1973–1975, 1977–1978, 1986, 2000–2003, 2007–2023
Peter Barlow	Chris Gascoyne	1965–1971, 1973–1975, 1977–1978, 1986, 2000–2003, 2007–2023

=== Last appeared in 2024 ===
Character	Actor(s)	Duration
Sarge Bailey	Ram John Holder	2023–2024
Terry Fensley	James Foster	2023–2024
Caitlin Edwards	Gillian Jephcott	2023–2024
Moses Ekundayo	Michael Fatogun	2023–2024
Gav Adetiba	Noah Olaoye	2023–2024
John Perry	Ian Peck	2024
Elspeth	Helen Lederer	2024
Harvey Gaskell	Will Mellor	2021–2022, 2024
Violet Wilson	Jenny Platt	2004–2008, 2011, 2024
Eliza Woodrow	Savannah Kunyo	2022–2024
Estelle Harrington	Ruthie Henshall	2023–2024
Linda Hancock	Jacqueline Leonard	2015, 2022–2024
Griff Reynolds	Michael Condron	2022–2024
Simon Barlow	Daniel Whelan	2003, 2008–2024
Simon Barlow	Jake and Oscar Hartley	2003, 2008–2024
Simon Barlow	Alex Bain	2003, 2008–2024
Nathan Curtis	Christopher Harper	2016–2018, 2024
Emily Wilkinson	Ellena Vincent	2024
Beth Tinker	Lisa George	2011–2024
Stefan Brent	Paul Opacic	2021, 2024
Nicky Wheatley	Kimberly Hart-Simpson	2020, 2022, 2024
Alina Pop	Ruxandra Porojnicu	2019–2021, 2024
Stu Carpenter	Bill Fellows	2021–2024
Damon Hay	Ciarán Griffiths	2022–2024
Paul Foreman	Peter Ash	2018–2024
Sabrina Adetiba	Luana Santos	2023–2024
Rowan Cunliffe	Emrhys Cooper	2024
Clayton Hibbs	Callum Harrison	2016–2017, 2019–2020, 2024
Richard Hillman	Brian Capron	2001–2003, 2024
Jesse Chadwick	John Thomson	2008–2010, 2024

=== Last appeared in 2025 ===
Characters	Actor(s)	Duration	Ref(s)
Matty Radcliffe	Séamus McGoff	2023–2025	
Brie Benson	Jessica Ellis	2025	
Gus Deering	Chris Garner	2024–2025	
Anthea Deering	Carol Royle	2024–2025	
Eric Sandford	Craig Cheetham	2022–2023, 2025	
Mason Radcliffe	Luca Toolan	2023–2025	
Seb Franklin	Harry Visinoni	2016–2021, 2025	
Andy Garland	Andrew Goth	2024–2025	
Yasmeen Nazir	Shelley King	2014–2025	
Tommy Orpington	Matt Milburn	2016, 2018–2021, 2023–2025	
Max Turner	Harry McDermott	2010–2025	
Max Turner	Paddy Bever	2010–2025	
Rob Donovan	Marc Baylis	2012–2017, 2025	
Reece Bolton	Scott Anson	2022–2025	
Daisy Midgeley	Charlotte Jordan	2020–2025	
Julie Carp	Katy Cavanagh	2008–2015, 2025	
Bobby Crawford	Jack Carroll	2023–2025	
Craig Tinker	Colson Smith	2011–2025	
Eileen Grimshaw	Sue Cleaver	2000–2025	
Jason Grimshaw	Ryan Thomas	2000–2016, 2025	
Joel Deering	Calum Lill	2023–2025	
Mick Michaelis	Joe Layton	2025	
Logan Radcliffe	Harry Lowbridge	2024–2025	
Aunty Rani	Josephine Lloyd-Welcome	2025	
Aadi Alahan	Hannah, Harris and Ria Ahmed	2006, 2009–2025	
Aadi Alahan	Zennon Ditchett	2006, 2009–2025	
Aadi Alahan	Adam Hussain	2006, 2009–2025	
Noah Hedley	Richard Winsor	2025	
Millie Silverton	Kaitlyn Earley	2025	
Jenny Bradley	Sally Ann Matthews	1986–1991, 1993, 2015–2025	
Pete Lang	Andrew Hayden-Smith	2025	
Dee Dee Bailey	Channique Sterling-Brown	2022–2025	
Laila Bailey	Araya Daniels	2025	
Laila Bailey	Raiya Walton	2025	
Gail Platt	Helen Worth	1974–2025	

=== Last appeared in 2026 ===
Characters	Actor (s)	Duration	Ref(s)
Billy Mayhew	Daniel Brocklebank	2014–2026	
Becky Swain	Amy Cudden	2025–2026	
Rich Pemberton	Jamie Cho	2024, 2026	
Lou Michaelis	Farrel Hegarty	2025–2026	
Mal Roper	Tim Treloar	2026	
Connie Waring	Aoife O'Neill	2026	
Connie Waring	Erin O'Neill	2026	
Miles Silverton	Lewis William Magee	2025–2026	
Trisha Marlow	Anita Booth	2025–2026	
Theo Silverton	James Cartwright	2025–2026	
Janine Walsh	Melissa Jacques	2026	
Melanie Driscoll	Cindy Humphrey	2026	
Lenny	Joe Osborne	2026	
Cassie Plummer	Claire Sweeney	2023–2026	
Gavin Fairholme	Andrew Lewis	2026	
Nina Lucas	Mollie Gallagher	2019–2026	
Celeste Butterfield	Frances Barber	2026	

== See also ==
- List of Coronation Street characters
