= List of Coronation Street characters introduced in 1966 =

This is a list of Coronation Street characters introduced in the year 1966, ordered by their first appearance.

== Jackie Marsh ==
Jackie Marsh
- Coronation Street character
- Portrayed by: Pamela Craig
- Duration: 1966
- First appearance: 5 January 1966; Episode 529
- Last appearance: 16 February 1966; Episode 541
- Created by: Howard Baker
- Introduced by: Adele Rose

Jackie Marsh is a reporter from the local paper who run a story sympathising with David Barlow's controversial sacking from the Weatherfield football club. She comes to Coronation Street in search of his family to give more insight into his early career and ends up running into his brother Ken. After they spend hours talking, the pair become firm friends, enjoying each other's company so much they meet up again. Their friendship gradually intensifies and before either of them stop to think of their actions, they embark on an affair — despite Ken being married to wife Valerie, mother to his children, at the time.

When Elsie Tanner caught them kissing, she warned Ken to end the affair or she would tell Val. Convinced Jackie was his true love, he freely let Elsie expose their deceit. However, he later decided that he had too much of a good thing going with Val to let it go so easily, and although she briefly left him, the Barlows reunited. Jackie never returned to the Street.

== Ernie Mills ==
Ernie Mills
- Coronation Street character
- Portrayed by: Jack Grieve
- Duration: 1966–1967
- First appearance: 10 January 1966; Episode 530
- Last appearance: 27 February 1967; Episode 647
- Created by: Howard Baker
- Introduced by: Jack Rosenthal

Ernie Mills is a friend of Dave Smith and regular customer at the betting shop. He appeared on a recurring basis in three separate stints, until February 1966, returning from May to June and again in February 1967.

== Fred Nuttall ==
Fred Nuttall
- Coronation Street character
- Portrayed by: Larry Noble
- Duration: 1966
- First appearance: 26 January 1966; Episode 535
- Last appearance: 2 February 1966; Episode 537
- Created by: Howard Baker
- Introduced by: Ron McDonnell

Fred Nuttall appears as Minnie Caldwell is falling into debt, and puts pressure on her to pay for a coat that she owes him. When Minnie tells him she can not pay up, Fred adds interest to the loan and threatens legal action, but she is rescued just in time when her old lodger Jed Stone turns up and cons him out of his own money to repay the debt.

== Joan Corrie ==
Joan Corrie
- Coronation Street character
- Portrayed by: Maureen O'Reilly
- Duration: 1966
- First appearance: 2 February 1966; Episode 537
- Last appearance: 9 February 1966; Episode 539
- Created by: Howard Baker
- Introduced by: John Finch
In-universe information
- Father: James Nugent
- Mother: Agnes Nugent
- Brothers: Edgar Nugent
- Sisters: Emily Bishop; Norah Seddon; Marjorie Nugent; Brenda Nugent
- Husband: Frank Corrie
- Nephews: Spider Nugent

Joan Corrie is the sister of Emily Nugent who came to Weatherfield to inform Emily that their father, James, has had a stroke and needs care, a responsibility that neither Joan or their two sisters are willing to provide. The news puts Emily in a difficult position as she had only a week earlier accepted a job working at a friend's shop in Mallorca, Joan tells her that if she does not take him on, their father will have to go into a care home. After considerable deliberation, Emily scolds her selfish siblings and tells everyone she has decided to go ahead with her original plans to emigrate. The Walkers throw a leaving party for Emily to wish her well in Mallorca, but later on Jerry Booth pulls Emily aside to tell her he knows she is actually going to Harrogate to look after her father.

== Brenda Riley ==
Brenda Riley
- Coronation Street character
- Portrayed by: Eileen Kennally
- Duration: 1966
- First appearance: 23 March 1966; Episode 551
- Last appearance: 27 April 1966; Episode 561
- Created by: Howard Baker
- Introduced by: Jack Rosenthal

Brenda Riley is an old flame of Jim Mount's who briefly takes over as relief manager of the Rovers Return when Jack and Annie Walker go on holiday.

Brenda is popular with Lucille Hewitt, who decided against going on holiday with her guardians, and Brenda helps her in her pursuit of the new recruit at the builders yard Ray Langton - whilst also setting her sights on Ray's boss Len Fairclough. It soon becomes clear Ray is treating Lucille badly, and Lucille admits to Brenda that Ray has stolen some whisky from the Rovers, whilst adding that he also wanted sex from her, only she refused. When Ray comes onto Brenda she is horrified and, looking out for her new friend, tells Ray to leave Lucille alone. Ray gets angry and threatens Brenda, but right then Len appears and sacks him on the spot, threatening him with the police. With nowhere left to go, Ray packs up and leaves town.

Brenda faces the wrath of Hilda Ogden upon her return to work as well, when she decides not to release Clara Midgeley from the cleaners job until she knows Annie's wishes. When Hilda bans the Rovers' most loyal customer, her husband Stan, from the Rovers, Brenda quickly has a change of heart and lets Hilda have her job back.

Naturally, when the Walkers eventually return, they find the Rovers in disarray and Annie is outraged when she is informed Brenda is to be kept on to teach her how to be friendly to customers. Annie orders Brenda to leave immediately, and without a word to Len, Brenda skips town with Jim the next day.

== Mr Snape ==
Mr Snape
- Coronation Street character
- Portrayed by: John Barcroft
- Duration: 1966
- First appearance: 27 April 1966; Episode 561
- Last appearance: 4 May 1966; Episode 563
- Created by: Howard Baker
- Introduced by: Jack Rosenthal

Mr Snape is the store manager at Pick-a-Snip supermarket, who accuses Ena Sharples of stealing two tins of salmon at four shillings and sixpence each. The police are called and Ena refuses a solicitor. At court, a confused Ena denies intentionally shoplifting and pleads not guilty, but the magistrate believes otherwise and fines her forty shillings.

== Ruth Winter ==
Ruth Winter
- Coronation Street character
- Portrayed by: Colette O'Neill
- Duration: 1966
- First appearance: 4 May 1966; Episode 563
- Last appearance: 27 July 1966; Episode 587
- Created by: Howard Baker
- Introduced by: Esther Rose

Ruth Winter is a social worker who was employed at the Mission Hall in the attempt to turn it into a community centre. Horrified Ena Sharples, long-standing live-in caretaker at the Mission, resigned from her position and moved in with her friend, Minnie Caldwell. Ruth, meanwhile, got to know the locals and began dating Len Fairclough, who earlier agreed to help her in organising the first big event for the community centre — a dance for the locals. Despite Len playing bouncer, the dance got out of hand and Ena and Lucille Hewitt were cornered by a couple of thugs when they try to stop them vandalising the place. It is Ruth who unexpectedly comes to the rescue when she outsmarts the pair and uses some handy martial arts skills she learnt years before.

Ruth's actions make Ena realise she's been silly, and she graciously accepts the invitation to return to her old post, moving back into the vestry. A couple of weeks later, Ruth reveals to her new friend Ena that an old boyfriend has got back in touch and proposed that they try again as man and wife — in Rome. When Ruth receives news that the community centre is to be moved across town, she decides the time is right to leave Weatherfield and be with Paul. The next day Ruth tells Len before the residents bid her farewell.
