= Collette Cooper =

British singer/songwriter and actor

Collette Cooper is a British singer/songwriter and actor from Manchester and lives in London.

{{subst: proposed deletion| concern=this person is not notable in their field nationally or internationally}}

== Career ==
Collette Cooper is a singer/songwriter currently working on her debut album, City of Sin, and has completed several music videos, Big Fat Liar and Bonkers. Collette performs in London and has performed at several fashion, charity and awards shows including Samuel L. Jackson One For the Boys karaoke benefit in collaboration with GQ on 25 September 2014 and The Gang Show at the Groucho Club on 4 October 2014 in support of Teenage Cancer Trust.

Collette is also an actor and has worked in theatre and film with the likes of Jane Campion, Michael Winterbottom and Samantha Morton. She plays Magdalen in the feature film Set the Thames on Fire by Ben Charles Edwards – a singer – along with Noel Fielding and Sally Phillips and performs two of her own tracks.

She does work on Nick Grimshaw’s Breakfast Show and has rerecorded the novelty song Selfie with Scarlett Johansson for BBC Radio.

== Personal life ==
Collette is an avid netball player and played with the England girls' netball team against the Radio1 Male DJs for a BBC comedy Commonwealth Games sketch in July 2014.

Collette cycled to Paris from London to raise money for cancer.

== Discography ==
- City of Sin (due out in 2015)

== Music videos ==
- "Big Fat Liar"
- "Bonkers"

== Filmography ==
- An Angel at My Table (1990)
- Gold: The World's Play (TV movie) (1991)
- Gold: The Merchants of Venus (TV movie) (1991)
- Gold: The Dynamiters (TV movie) (1991)
- Gold: Frenchie's Gold (TV movie) (1991)
- Gold: A Fistful of Gold (TV movie) (1991)
- Playing the Field (TV series) (1998–2000)
- 24 Hour Party People (2002)
- Coronation Street (TV series) (2002)
- Nice Guy Eddie (TV series) (2002)
- Doctors (2002)
- Casualty (TV series) (2003) – credited as Colette Cooper
- The Courtroom (TV series) (2004)
- "Bipolar" (short) (2006)
- Murder in Mind (2009)
- The Unloved (TV movie) (2009)
- "Miss Mia Meows" (short) (2012)
- Flim: The Movie (2014) – Screened at the 2014 Raindance Festival in London
- "Room 55" (short) (2014) – completed
- Set the Thames on Fire (2015) – post-production
