= List of Coronation Street characters introduced in 1991 =

Coronation Street is a British soap opera first broadcast on 9 December 1960. The following is a list of characters that first appeared in 1991, by order of first appearance.

== Robert Weston ==
Robert Weston
- Coronation Street character
- Portrayed by: Philip Bretherton
- First appearance: 14 January 1991
- Last appearance: 1 March 1991
- Introduced by: Mervyn Watson
In-universe information
- Occupation: Dentist
- Wife: Linda Weston

Robert Weston, portrayed by Philip Bretherton, was a married dentist who had an affair with Jenny Bradley (Sally Ann Matthews) in 1991. He made his first appearance on 14 January 1991. This would be Bretherton's second of three roles in Coronation Street, after playing Rod, a friend of Suzie Birchall (Cheryl Murray) and Gail Potter (Helen Worth) in 1977 and then going on to play regular character Ian Davenport, a car salesman who had an affair with Sally Webster (Sally Dynevor) between 2004 and 2005.

Robert was 38 years old when he met 20 year old Jenny. His marriage to Linda was on the rocks, which was having an effect on their two children. When Jenny met Robert, she was dating Mark Casey (Stuart Wolfenden), but she began to find him immature and boring. Jenny ended up falling for Robert, him being 18 years her senior with a good career and lots of money to spend. However, she never expected him to leave his wife for her. She subsequently left Weatherfield with Robert.

In 1993, when Jenny returned to Coronation Street, Robert had left her to return to his wife. As a result, Jenny took Robert's pregnant Japanese Akita Mitzi, which was worth £1,000, passing her off to her foster mother Rita Sullivan (Barbara Knox) as her own dog out of spite. Robert responded by clearing out their joint bank account and taking Mitzi whilst she was in Mavis (Thelma Barlow) and Derek Wilton's (Peter Baldwin) care.

== Brendan Scott ==
Brendan Scott
- Coronation Street character
- Portrayed by: Milton Johns
- Duration: 1991–1993
- First appearance: 1 February 1991
- Last appearance: 20 August 1993
- Introduced by: Mervyn Watson

Brendan Scott, played by Milton Johns, made recurring appearances from 1991 to 1993. He is the former manager of Bettabuy and later the owner of the Corner Shop. Brendan harbours a strong resentment of Reg Holdsworth (Ken Morley) who was responsible for his sacking at Bettabuy in the 1980s and attempts to get his revenge by accusing Reg of rigging a prize draw. However, his plan backfires when he has no solid evidence against Reg. Brendan later becomes a judge at a beauty contest and attempts to sleep with contestant Raquel Wolstenhulme (Sarah Lancashire) but is caught by Curly Watts (Kevin Kennedy) who threatens to report him to his superiors. Brendan buys the corner shop from Alf Roberts (Bryan Mosley) after learning that Reg was planning to do the same. Brendan eventually becomes overwhelmed with managing the shop and dies of a heart attack.

== Joss Shackleton ==
Joss Shackleton
- Coronation Street character
- Portrayed by: Harold Goodwin
- First appearance: 25 February 1991
- Last appearance: 1 May 1991
- Introduced by: Mervyn Watson
In-universe information
- Daughters: Vera Duckworth (unconfirmed)
- Grandsons: Terry Duckworth (unconfirmed)

Joss Shackleton was introduced in episode 1.3913 as an old friend of Amy Burton's, who claimed to be Vera Duckworth's biological father.

Joss was a practised liar and fantasist who told cock-and-bull stories about his own life to impress people. Many of his tall tales involved Royalty; in his career as a barber, he boasted that he'd shaved princes, prime ministers and maharajas, worked at the George V Hotel in Paris, and that he was in the middle of shaving Jack Buchanan when the air raid siren sounded and was ordered to carry on so that Jack looked presentable in the bomb shelter. Another claim was that he'd spent a period butlering at one of the finest houses in Kent and earned a fortune in tips, which he whittled away having picked up his employers' spending habits.

Joss's friendship with Vera's mother Amy appears to have been legitimate, dating back to when they lived a street apart from each other as children. In 1937, when Vera was born, he was serving in the army with Joe Kay. According to Joss, Vera's youth was an agonising time as he saw her every week but wasn't able to let on that he was her real father. He grew ever closer to a long-widowed Amy in their old age, except for a period in 1987 when Joss was courting a woman he met at a lonely hearts club who subsequently died. In February 1991, coincidentally right before Amy suffered a fatal heart attack, she made a new will instructing Vera to see that Joss wanted for nothing until his dying day. After the behest was revealed to Vera by her Auntie Cissie at Amy's funeral tea, Joss dropped the bombshell that he was Vera's father.

While Vera digested Joss's revelation, he was welcomed into her home, relegating the Duckworths' lodger Curly Watts to the sofa. Still grieving for her mother, Vera accepted Joss as her father more through force of will than any evidence proffered. Jack, on the other hand, had been sceptical since the will reading, suspecting that Joss had coerced Amy into making the behest and told Vera a pack of lies in order to sponge off them, despite having a flat of his own. Unfortunately, Vera was determined to carry out her mother's dying wish and wouldn't hear a word against Joss.

Jack wasn't beaten yet - he only had to prove that Joss was a liar. When Curly moved in with Angie Freeman, losing the Duckworths his rent, Jack asked Joss to chip in, to which Joss replied that he didn't carry money as he became a disciple of Gandhi after playing darts with him in Oldham - another tale which Vera accepted unquestionably. When Vera found a photo of Edward VII in Joss's possession, Joss explained that the former King was his grandfather, with his mother being the result of an affair between Edward and Joss's grandmother at a stately home in Leeds where she worked as a servant girl. Convinced that she had Royal blood in her, Vera dismissed Jack when he acted as the voice of reason; as a commoner, it was beyond his understanding.

In April, after returning from his cousin's in Scarborough, Joss began to mingle more in Coronation Street. He took a shine to Emily Bishop after chatting to her at the Friends of Weatherfield Hospital Charity Shop, but was oblivious when Phyllis Pearce fell for his charms. Emily wasn't interested in Joss, but put up with him and his flights of fancy out of politeness, to the extent of letting him have lunch with her at the Rovers. Percy Sugden, who was the only person aside from Jack who saw Joss for the fraud he was, was worried that Emily would fall for his patter and so, when he walked into the charity shop to find Joss tangoing with Emily to the music of old records, he jealously pushed him out of the way causing Joss to hit his head, knocking him out cold.

After a short stay in Weatherfield General and a blood transfusion, Joss was restored to health. A guilty Percy offered his blood but was the wrong type, as was Vera. Jack took this as cast iron proof that Joss wasn't Vera's father, but as his word regarding medical matters wasn't enough for Vera, he went to the blood centre to have it confirmed by a doctor. Unfortunately for Jack, Dr Bannerman told him that Joss and Vera could still be related. Thwarted yet again, Jack resigned himself to the fact that Joss would never leave.

A few days later, Jack applied for a job as a driver to a private house in Knutsford, with Vera as housekeeper. He knew that they stood no chance of being hired, hoping only to blag an interview so that they could make a huge expenses claim. Amazingly, Mrs Maxwell-Glover loved them and offered them the jobs, pending references. Joss had disapproved of the whole endeavour - particularly as there'd be no room for him in the staffs' quarters - but when he saw how much Vera wanted it, he forged references for them and also gave Jack a lesson on etiquette, using his experience from his purported years in service. However, at the last minute Vera got cold feet, unwilling to risk Mrs Maxwell-Glover checking up on the references.

In early May, the water went off on the terraced side of Coronation Street, resulting in Joss moving back home. When the water was turned back on, the bath Vera had been running flooded the house, and so Joss stayed away. Settled back in his own flat, Joss never returned to Coronation Street. He died two years later, on 8 November 1993. Vera wrote to the Queen to inform her of her cousin's passing and, as Joss had left no policies, she paid for her dad's funeral out of her recent bingo winnings. His flat contained no letters from the Royals but an ashtray inscribed "present from Windsor Castle" and an old pot dog, which Vera took home with her.

== Vivian Barford ==
Vivian Barford
- Coronation Street character
- Portrayed by: Paula Tilbrook
- Duration: 1991, 1993
- First appearance: 15 March 1991
- Last appearance: 2 July 1993
- Introduced by: Mervyn Watson
In-universe information
- Husband: Desmond Barford

Vivian Barford, portrayed by Paula Tilbrook, was an old friend of Alf Roberts (Bryan Mosley). She first appeared on 15 March 1991 and was initially credited as Mrs. Barford in her first three episodes. She was then credited as Vivienne Barford for her next three and as Vivian Barford for her two appearances in 1993. She met Alf in 1987 and she was involved in Weatherfield Association of Retail Traders and Stockholders (WARTS). Within those years, she emigrated to Spain after her husband, Desmond died and returned to the UK. After giving a speech as the President of WARTS, she managed to convince Alf to step up as a councillor again.

After retiring from the council in 1993, Vivian gave Alf honorary life membership of Warts, much to his wife, Audrey Roberts' (Sue Nicholls) horror.

== Barbara Platt ==
Barbara Platt
- Coronation Street character
- Portrayed by: Barbara Young
- First appearance: 23 September 1991
- Last appearance: 4 October 1991
- Introduced by: Mervyn Watson
In-universe information
- Occupation: Cook
- Husband: Barry Platt
- Sons: Martin Platt
- Grandsons: David Platt
- Granddaughters: Charlotte Platt
- Other relatives: Lily Platt

Barbara Platt, played by Barbara Young, is the mother of Martin Platt.

Barbara didn't play much of a part in her son's life after he moved out to live with Gail Tilsley. Gail didn't know what Barbara thought of the ten-year age gap between her and Martin and was worried when she heard that Barbara would be visiting them after they announced their engagement in 1991. In the event, Barbara was down-to-Earth and open-minded, and the age difference didn't even come up. It turned out that she had come to give Gail a slinky blue slip to wear at the wedding. Later, at the reception in the Rovers Return, Barbara and her husband Barry gave the newlyweds their gift of a honeymoon in Abersoch, with Barbara staying on at their house, 33 Hammond Road, to look after their child David while they were away, as well as Nicky and Sarah Louise Tilsley, Gail's children with her late husband Brian. Barbara then took charge of the party and got everyone doing the conga.

Barbara didn't encounter any problems while watching the kids, although Ivy Brennan gave her a cool reception. Ivy felt that Barbara was not properly part of the family and was critical of Barbara drinking at the reception when there were children around. Barbara tried to get to know the Brennans by inviting them over for dinner, but only Don came as Ivy was annoyed at him for accepting on her behalf and refused to go. Barbara didn't pick up on Ivy's feelings and when Ivy later offered to take Nicky off her hands for a while by taking him to church, Barbara was grateful. When Martin and Gail returned from their honeymoon, Barbara returned home and was never seen again.
