= Irene Sutcliffe =

English actress (1924–2019)

- Born: 12 July 1924; Burnley, Lancashire, England
- Died: 3 May 2019 (aged 94); England
- Occupation: Actress
- Years active: 1953–2015

Irene Sutcliffe (12 July 1924 – 3 May 2019) was an English actress. She was best known for playing Maggie Clegg in ITV's Coronation Street, a role she played from 1968 until 1975. She had a long career; her first credited TV role was in 1953 on BBC's Sunday Night Theatre and her last in 2015. In 1999, Sutcliffe was a finalist for the Audie Award for Best Female Narrator for her narration of Jane Austen's Pride and Prejudice.

== Early life ==
Sutcliffe was born and brought up in Burnley, Lancashire, during her early life. Her father, Fred Sutcliffe, was an ironmonger. She trained at the London Academy of Music and Dramatic Art.

== Personal life ==
Sutcliffe died on 3 May 2019 at the age of 94.

== Selected credits ==
Television

- 1953 Sunday Night Theatreas Desdemona in the Episode "Will Shakespeare"
- 1966 Emergency Ward 10 as Night Sister
- 1968-1975 Coronation Street as Maggie Clegg/Cooke (series regular, 412 episodes)
- 1980 Lady Killers as Gladys Yule
- 1984 Juliet Bravo as Mrs Williams in the Episode "Getting Away With It" (Season 5, Episode 4)
- 1987 Inspector Morse (season 1, Episode 1) as Mrs Hornsby
- 1987 Miss Marple as Miss Gorringe in the Episode "At Bertram's Hotel" (Episode 7)
- 1989 All Creatures Great & Small as Sister Rose in the Episode "The New World" (Season 6, Episode 7)
- 1995 She's Out Mrs Simms
- 1997 Hetty Wainthropp Investigates as Helen Rance in the episode "Woman Of The Year" (Season 2, Episode 6)
- 2007 Doc Martin as Janet Sawle in the episode "Nowt So Queer"
- 2010 Doctors as Joan Woolf in the Episode "The Tiptoe of Expectation" (Season 12, Episode 33)
- 2015 The Royals as The King's Mother

Film

- 1987 Withnail and I as Mabs Blennerhassit

Radio

- 1975 Dark Green by Rose Tremaine (BBC Radio 4 play)
- 1977 The School for Scandal (BBC Radio 4) as Lady Sneerwell
- 1997 Death on the Nile (BBC Radio 4 adaptation) as Mrs Van Shuyler
