= Jenna Kamara =

Fictional character from Coronation Street

- Coronation Street character
- Portrayed by: Krissi Bohn
- Duration: 2012–14
- First appearance: 19 September 2012
- Last appearance: 13 August 2014
- Introduced by: Phil Collinson
In-universe information
- Occupation: Physiotherapist; Shop assistant Café waitress
- Father: Lloyd Mullaney
- Mother: Mandy Kamara
- Stepfather: Johnny Kamara

Jenna Kamara is a fictional character from the British soap opera Coronation Street, played by Krissi Bohn. The character and casting was announced in July 2012 and she made her first appearance on 19 September 2012. Bohn had quit acting and was working in a sexual health clinic when she auditioned for the role of Jenna, and she said that she really enjoyed being on the soap. Jenna was introduced alongside her mother Mandy Kamara (Pamela Nomvete), and it is revealed that Jenna is the daughter of established character Lloyd Mullaney (Craig Charles). The three characters made up the first black family unit in Coronation Street. Jenna is initially shocked upon finding out that Lloyd is her father and despite initially being hostile, she later develops a relationship with him.

Jenna's sexuality was later explored when established character Sophie Webster (Brooke Vincent) develops feelings for Jenna, who is her physiotherapist. The pair end up kissing, which leads to Jenna losing her job. Kamara found it interesting that Jenna came out on the soap due to being 28-years-old. Upon coming out to her parents, Lloyd is supportive but Mandy initially is not. Despite the 10-year age gap, Jenna and Sophie develop a relationship, but it does not last. Bohn said that viewers had responded positively to Jenna and Sophie's pairing. In May 2014, it was announced that Bohn's contract was not renewed and she would be leaving Coronation Street. The actress was disappointed by this but was grateful for the experience she had had on the soap. She filmed her final scenes the following month and made her final appearance on 13 August 2014. The character's exit storyline saw Jenna leave to doing volunteering work overseas.

== Development ==
=== Casting and introduction ===
In July 2012, it was announced that Krissi Bohn had joined the cast of soap opera Coronation Street as new character Jenna Kamara, in addition to Pamela Nomvete joining the soap as Jenna's mother, Mandy Kamara. It was reported that Jenna would be revealed to be the secret daughter of established character Lloyd Mullaney (Craig Charles), with a writer from ITV teasing, "Lloyd's past comes back to haunt him when he bumps into an old flame and discovers a grown-up daughter he never knew he had! A long-dead affair is rekindled and secrets and lies come spilling out as Lloyd, his ex Mandy and their daughter Jenna, struggle to come to terms with the secret Mandy has carried for over 20 years." It was also reported that Jenna and Mandy would move to Weatherfield, the fictional setting of Coronation Street, and that Jenna would begin work as a doctor, though it was also teased that another secret would "rock this fragile new family". Coronation Street producer Phil Collinson said that Jenna and Mandy's introductions would allow the creation of a new family for Lloyd and he called Bohn and Nomvete "terrific actresses". Collinson revealed that Jenna is a "clever, educated young woman" and that she would struggle to accept Lloyd as her biological father. It had previously been reported early that month that the soap was casting two actresses to play Lloyd's daughter and her mother, with it being reported that Lloyd would have a "pretty explosive" reaction upon finding out he has a daughter. It was also reported that the characters would be regulars on the soap.

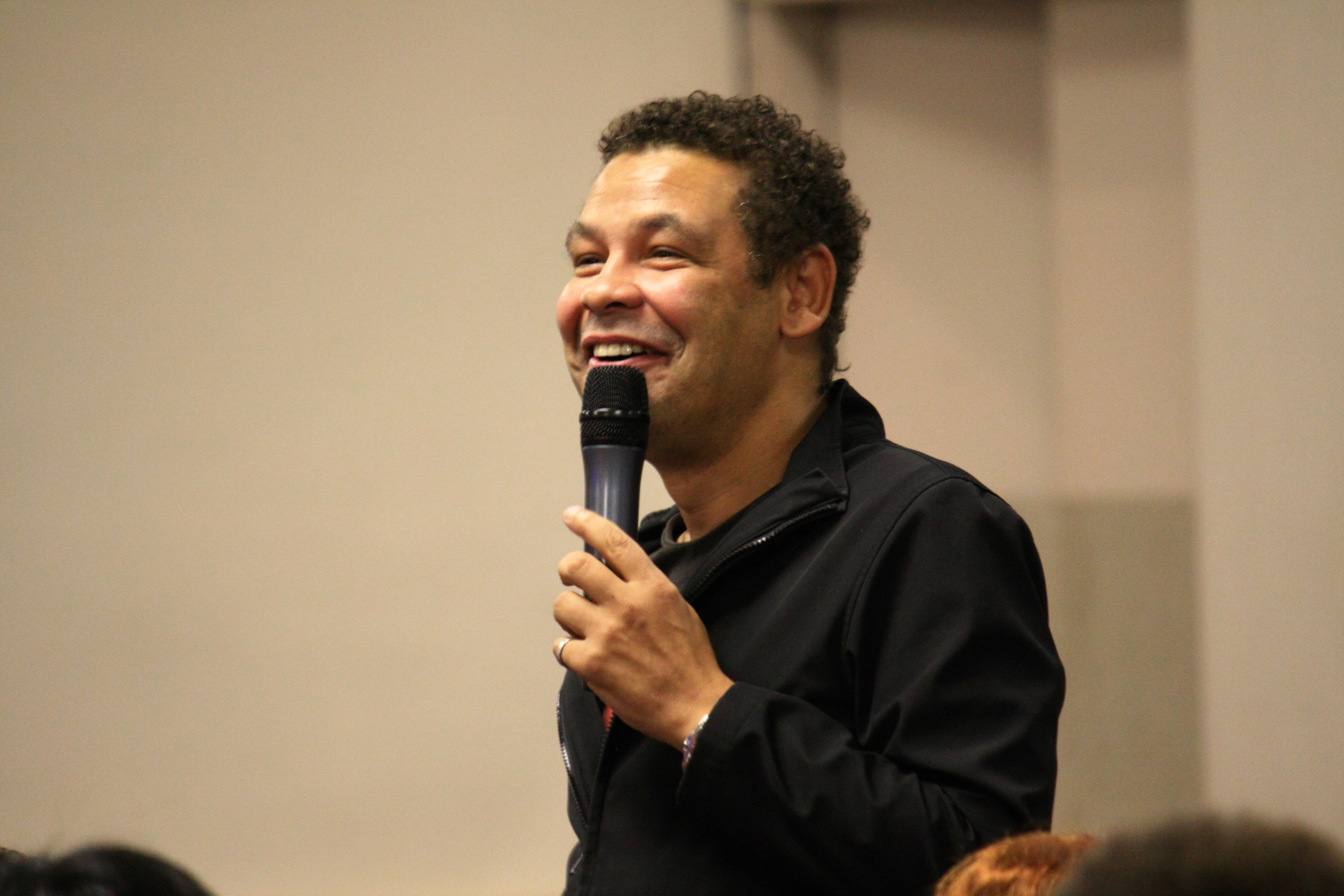
Jenna was introduced as the daughter of Lloyd, played by Craig Charles (pictured)

Charles had previously suggested to the soap before their 50th anniversary that they introduce their first black family and they later came up with this plot. The storyline was set to " get the storyline all together" for the anniversary, but it was postponed as Charles temporarily left the soap to film new episodes for Red Dwarf. Charles enjoyed the storyline, saying, "the actual storyline itself is great. It's Lloyd bumping into an old girlfriend who later went off with his best mate - he never knew that she'd given birth to his child and it's now nearly 30 years later". The actor believed that the storyline was realistic as his friend had recently discovered that he had a teenage daughter who he never knew about. Charles had done the auditions with Nomvete and Bohn and they were chosen on an "executive level", with Charles being happy that they had been cast. He helped the actresses with settling into the soap. Charles believed that Lloyd would be a good father to Jenna as he was already father-like figure to other characters in the soap, but he also revealed that Jenna would initially be wary of Lloyd, explaining, "All of a sudden she realises that her father wasn't the man she knew - Johnny, who has since died. So a lot of Jenna's storyline is about overcoming that, and Lloyd going through a similar process because he never knew she existed. So at first we're in total shock, and Jenna doesn't really take the news very well". Charles added that Lloyd does not want to replace Johnny as he raised Jenna, but instead he wants to get to know her and see where their relationship goes. Charles also revealed that both Jenna and Mandy would be involved in storylines not to do with Lloyd as well, adding that the characters would become "integral" to the soap and affect the other characters.

Discussing her casting, Bohn revealed that she had quit acting about a year prior due to the lack of roles she had received and was working in a sexual health clinic before she was cast in Coronation Street. She then was emailed by her agent about a new role in the soap and so her mother paid for her train fare from Cornwall to Manchester, where the soap is filmed. Bohn joked, "On the Wednesday I was looking at men's private parts and then on Friday I was in the Rovers Return, the most iconic pub in the world". Bohn and her husband ended up renting a flat in Manchester, with the actress saying, "I was happy before, but this is the most exciting thing that has ever happened". Charles said about Bohn getting an acting role on the soap, "She's walking around pinching herself now and she can't believe how much things have changed". In January 2013, it was reported that Bohn had signed on for another six months. That same month, Bohn said that she loved being on the soap, calling it a "nice place to work" and commenting, "Joining the show is the most exciting thing that has happened to me so far in my life. I feel like I've fitted in well". She added that she found it easy to make friends on the soap due to everyone being so welcoming, though she added that everyone films at different times due to having different storylines. Talking about her casting process, Bohn revealed, "I think my audition story was a little bit faster than a lot of people's. I had my first audition on a Tuesday, the screen test on the Friday and I started the Friday after. At the screen test, I did scenes with Craig and Pamela, and then one with Georgia May Foote who plays Katy Armstrong. Georgia was standing in for the role of Sophie as Brooke was on holiday!" Bohn also tweeted that she loved being Lloyd's daughter.

Bohn made her first appearance as Jenna on 19 September 2012. In the episode, Lloyd goes to Mandy's house as he wants to keep his former romantic partner in his life; however, Jenna answers the door instead and tells Lloyd that she is Mandy's daughter, which makes him suspicious as Mandy had told him that she lived alone. A "Shellshocked" Lloyd then wonders if Mandy is his daughter and he realises why Mandy felt uneasy when he saw her again after all those years. Lloyd also believes that Jenna looks a lot like his mother and his cousin, Grace. After a confrontation, Jenna then finds out that Lloyd is her biological father as Mandy had an affair with him in the 1980s. Bohn related to the storyline as she did not know her biological father, having been raised in an orphanage and later adopted. Charles explained that Lloyd finding out about Jenna's existence is "bittersweet" as he is sad to have missed out being her father but he is also excited. He added that Lloyd wants to get to know Jenna as she is his daughter, but he makes mistakes by "steamrolling in".

=== Romance with Sophie ===
In October 2012, it was reported that Jenna would start a romance with established character Sophie Webster (Brooke Vincent). After Sophie is involved in a road accident, physiotherapist Jenna nurses Sophie over several months and the pair become closer, with Sophie developing feelings towards Jenna. An insider revealed that Jenna would be breaking "moral code" by being with Sophie, explaining, "Sophie is in a very vulnerable position following the car accident. If Jenna's bosses find out they could end her career. If that wasn't enough, Jenna hasn't come out to her parents. So they may have all these feelings for each other but they are going to have to weigh up whether it's worth the chaos". Furthermore, the couple also have a ten-year age gap and think that it will be difficult for their parents to accept. The situation was also reported to become further complicated when Sophie's father Kevin Webster (Michael Le Vell) develops feelings for Jenna. Vincent had previously revealed that Sophie would have a new love interest but did not specify about whether it would be a new or established character. Charles revealed on This Morning that Lloyd would be shocked at Jenna's new romance but would ultimately support her, saying, "I think Lloyd's a cool cat, really. I think he just wants her to be happy. But there's going to be a lot of tensions".

"I think I was quite lucky in that respect. I had the initial story of Lloyd being Jenna's real dad, and how she reacted when she found out. After that I had a settling-in period, but then the story with Sophie started. I have definitely hit the ground running and it was a baptism of fire at the beginning, but sometimes I think it's better to dive straight in there!"

— Bohn on Jenna's early storylines (2013)

In the storyline, Sophie develops big feelings towards Jenna; talking to Radio Times about Sophie's feelings for Jenna, Vincent explained that since Sophie's accident, Jenna has "made the ride a lot easier" and distracted Sophie from what has been happening, and that Sophie never "dreamt it could happen" but the time went much quicker because she developed feelings towards Jenna. Vincent explained, "It's been gradually growing during the time she has been seeing Jenna. Jenna has seemed very interested in Sophie – she's probably just been being polite and professional, but Sophie has wanted to read much more into it and has made a point of telling Jenna she is a lesbian. She is trying to suss out how Jenna feels" Vincent revealed that Sophie is constantly trying to be nice to Jenna and "push it onto the next level" by getting her a costly present for Christmas and buying her drinks in the pub, which leads to an uncomfortable Jenna telling Sophie that she is crossing the line. However, after Jenna gives Sophie a ride home and she reads a lot into what the physiotherapist does, which leads to Sophie believing that it is time to be honest about her feelings.

Jenna tells Sophie that she will be assigning her to a different physiotherapist as they have crossed a line and are no longer professional, but Sophie initially believes that it is because Jenna has feelings for her and so she "just decides to move in for the kill and thinks it is now or never really". As Sophie is "crushed" that her appointments with Jenna will soon be ending, she decides to "finally" make a move and confesses that she fancies Jenna. Jenna hints that she feels the same way and the pair end up kissing after Sophie initiates it. However, Kevin walks in on them and he is furious, and Jenna worries that she has made a bad mistake when Kevin threatens to report her to her boss. Vincent explained that Sophie initially did not get the response that she wanted, but just as something was about to happen, "Kevin walks in and ruins it all". The actress also explained that Kevin is embarrassed that he tried to pursue Jenna, who is not interested in men, and added, "He can't blame Sophie as she's his daughter. He just feels stupid and he wants to blame someone". Vincent revealed that Sophie is "gutted" and very angry at Kevin for threatening to report Jenna to her boss, explaining, "He ruined things for [Sophie] with Sian and now he's ruining this with Jenna. He knows he is doing it for the wrong reasons too". Boh explained that Jenna was trying to keep her relationship with Sophie "purely professional", but she later gives into her feelings and responds when Sophie kisses her, though she later realises that she should not have done it.

"I think that they're an odd match, but that doesn't mean they're not good! There's the age difference to consider, and the fact that Jenna has this professional life that she's worked so hard for, while Sophie works in a shop. There's nothing wrong with working in a shop, but they're very different people. However, they do say opposites attract. Even though Sophie is a lot younger, I do think she has something to offer and teach Jenna with the fact that she's open with her sexuality, people accept her for it and she doesn't hide herself away. I think there's a lot they can share with each other."

— Bohn on Jenna and Sophie's pairing (2013)

Jenna is then suspended from her job when the truth is revealed. At Jenna's employment tribunal for her kiss with the teenager, Sophie tells Jenna that she will take the blame in order to exonerate her, which makes Jenna realise that Sophie is "kind-hearted" and really cares for her. Bohn explained that Sophie is "prepared to put herself on the line and say to everyone she made it up when she's going to end up looking like the bad guy. The fact that she's willing to do that for Jenna really opens her eyes, she's willing to lie for her when Jenna won't even stand up and tell the truth." Bohn also explained that although Jenna originally thinks that Sophie is saying this "on a whim", she then realises that Sophie has thought it through, which makes her realise that Sophie is more mature that she originally believed. The actress revealed that Jenna does not know what she is going to say until "the words come out of her mouth" and that there is a part of Jenna that knows she has feelings towards Sophie and does not want Sophie to lie as it would be dishonest.

Discussing Jenna's relationship with Lloyd and getting to know him, Bohn revealed that Jenna has realised that her father is a very nice and does not judge, explaining, "He gives her the space to say what she wants to say and he's really supportive when she tells him the truth [about her sexuality and the kiss], he makes it clear that she's his daughter and he'll stand by her whatever she does. He doesn't tell her to lie to the tribunal, he doesn't say tell the truth, he just tells her to go with her heart". Bohn explained that Lloyd would be supportive, saying, "As people who watch the show will know, he's quite a happy-go-lucky kind of guy, and he reacts that way in his conversation with Jenna. Part of it is because he's just found this daughter and obviously doesn't want to lose her! But another part of it is because Lloyd really does accept Jenna for who she is, and he wants her to be happy. It's the first time that Jenna feels comfortable enough to come out to someone. She didn't have that with Johnny, who she thought was her dad". However, Bohn believed that Mandy would not find it easy to accept Jenna's sexuality due to Johnny having not been, adding, "Mandy has got so many hopes and dreams for Jenna in the future, and being a lesbian may not be part of that!" Bohn got on with both Nomvete and Charles and the three would have meals together and catch up, and Bohn called Charles "probably the best person I could have as an on-screen dad" as she would ask him a lot of questions due to not having a lot of television experience herself.

Bohn revealed that Jenna is finding it really difficult choosing between her job and feelings for Sophie, explaining, "Her job is her passion - it's the one thing she's worked so hard for her whole life, her mum is so proud of her and she's really struggling with the thought of losing it all". The actress added that Jenna is "torn" as she does have feelings for Sophie but desperately wants to keep her job and revealed, "Ultimately it's only when she goes in through the doors that she decides what to do". Bohn believed that Jenna would not have the "head space" for a relationship after the tribunal as she will be trying to sort out her career and family. However, the actress also hoped that Jenna and Sophie would end up having a proper relationship despite their age difference, adding, "I'd quite like everything Jenna's been through to be for a reason rather than this all happen and them not get together". Bohn believed that the relationship would be "interesting" and differ from Sophie's previously relationship with Sian.

During an interview with Digital Spy, Bohn explained that Jenna has likely been aware of her sexuality for the majority of her adult life but had never been confident enough to come out to anyone, including her parents, or had a serious relationship with anyone, adding, "It's been a difficult adulthood for Jenna - a tough time for her so far". Bohn had been told that Jenna would probably be gay and she found it interesting that Jenna would come out during her time on the soap as Bohn believed that she would have already done so due to being an older woman; Bohn also found the "patient-clinician issue" an interesting way to explore the character's sexuality. Bohn further explained that the situation with Sophie is difficult as "due to her professional commitments when she was treating Sophie, she hasn't allowed herself to fully feel whatever it is she might be feeling. But Sophie is one of the first women that Jenna has had strong feelings for, which makes things a lot harder for her when it comes to her career". Bohn enjoyed working with Vincent and commented how she would help Bohn with working on the soap due to having more experience in it despite being younger. After initially only working with her onscreen parents, Bohn was also happy to be working with the "iconic" Webster family, which she initially found "quite nerve-wracking". She also believed that Jenna would continue to have tension with Kevin and Sally Webster (Sally Dynevor), Sophie's mother. Bohn also hoped that Jenna would move into the street and have more scenes at the Rovers, the local pub where Mandy works, and that Jenna would have some happy times as "people need to see Jenna smiling for once!" Jenna and Sophie end up having a relationship but end up splitting up later in 2013.

=== Departure ===
In May 2014, it was announced that Bohn would be departing Coronation Street later that year. Bohn said that she was disappointed that her contract was not renewed but was grateful for the experience she had gained and had "enjoyed every single moment" of her time on the soap, and she added that she was looking forward to "to whatever the future may hold". Coronation Street producer Stuart Blackburn said of the departure, "It is with great regret that we're saying goodbye to Krissi, she's a wonderful person and a great actor who has played a key role in some fantastic stories. We wish her all the very best for her future." It was also reported that the character had been written out as ITV bosses had run out of storylines for Jenna. Nomvete had already left the soap as Mandy the previous year. Bohn filmed her final scenes in June 2014, and she thanked the crew and cast of the soap for "an amazing 700 days".

Bohn's final appearance as Jenna aired on 13 August 2014. In the storyline, Jenna has a "heart-to-heart" with Sophie, which leaves her feeling positive, and she then tells Lloyd that she will be leaving to do volunteer work oversees as she wants to do more with her life. This saddens Lloyd as he has to say goodbye to Jenna. Jenna explains to Lloyd that she feels that she is stuck in a "dead end job" and living with her father at 30 and that she will be going to Burnley to stay with a friend before going oversees. Lloyd then tells Jenna that he is worried about losing his daughter that he only recently found. Prior to this, Jenna ended up being duped into having dinner with Lloyd and his girlfriend Andrea Beckett (Hayley Tamaddon), who Jenna is not a fan of, and critics questioned whether the two women would be able to "sort out their differences" before Jenna's exit.

== Storylines ==
Jenna grew up thinking that Johnny was her biological father. In 2012, Lloyd Mullaney (Craig Charles) bumps into his former lover Mandy Kamara (Pamela Nomvete) and believes that she is keeping something from him when she is cold towards him. Lloyd ends up meeting Mandy's daughter Jenna, which makes him suspicious as Mandy had told him that she lived alone. Lloyd visits Jenna again and realises that her date of birth coincides with his fling with Mandy. She eventually admits to 28-year-old Jenna that Lloyd is her father, which devastates Jenna. Jenna throws Mandy out and refuses to see Lloyd. However, she later agrees to get to know him and makes up with her mother, with both of them moving to Weatherfield with Lloyd. She is also happy when Mandy and Lloyd get back together.

18-year-old Sophie Webster (Brooke Vincent) develops feelings for Jenna, her physiotherapist, when she begins to rehabilitate her after an accident. Sophie makes Jenna uncomfortable by getting her expensive presents and buying her drinks at the pub and she tells Sophie that she will have to end their sessions. Sophie ends up kissing Jenna and she responds, although she immediately regrets it due to it risking her career. Mandy is unhappy with Jenna's sexuality whereas Lloyd is supportive, which causes issues between the pair. Mandy also accuses Sophie of damaging Jenna'a career. Jenna ends up losing her job when she admits that she kissed Sophie. Sophie and Jenna become a couple and Mandy eventually accepts Jenna's sexuality. However, Mandy becomes upset when Jenna begins working a cafe as she feels that Jenna has sacrificed her career to be with Sophie. Mandy reconciles with her departure before she leaves Weatherfield following her break up with Lloyd. Jenna grows tired of Sophie trying to break up her mother Sally Webster's (Sally Dynevor) relationship with Tim Metcalfe (Joe Duttine) and breaks up with Sophie as the age gap between them is too big. Jenna takes a dislike to Lloyd's new girlfriend Andrea Beckett (Hayley Tamaddon) and this worsens when it is revealed that Andrea is married to someone else. Jenna is angry when Andrea and Lloyd decide to get back together following a break up. Jenna later decides to leave Weatherfield to do volunteering work and bids an emotional goodbyes to Sophie, Andrea and Lloyd before leaving.

== Reception ==
In January 2013, Bohn explained that Jenna had received an overall "good reaction", explaining, "I think people have enjoyed seeing Jenna come into the show as part of Lloyd's family. Now that the Sophie story is starting, I'm getting a lot more Twitter feedback!" Bohn explained that she was initially worried about "die-hard Sophie and Sian fans", but she found out that some of them had positive reactions to Sophie moving on with another woman. Daniel Kilkelly from Digital Spy believed that Jenna had let "her guard down" by hinting that she has romantic feelings for Sophie. He also believed that Jenna's kiss with Sophie was "unprofessional behaviour". He also opined that the reveal of Jenna's existence changed Lloyd's life "forever". Kilkelly also commented on how Jenna had two big storylines early on in her stint and questioned whether she would question her career by telling the truth in her tribunal, teasing that it could be "life-changing". Kilkelly later opined that Jenna had a "low-key" departure. A writer from Manchester Metropolitan University's website opined that Bohn was "perfect as the headstrong, cheeky Jenna". Tyrone Marshall from the Lancashire Telegraph reported how viewers from Burnley "couldn't believe their ears" when Jenna told Lloyd that she would be going to Burnley. He also reported how her "spur of the moment" departure was watched by 6.4 million viewers. Marshall also called Jenna's final scenes with Lloyd "emotional". In 2023, it was reported that viewers recognised Booth from her role as Jenna when she briefly appeared in EastEnders that same year.
