= Harold Goodwin (English actor) =

English actor (1917–2004)

- in The Avengers: Build a Better Mousetrap (1964)
- Born: 22 October 1917; Wombwell, West Riding of Yorkshire, England
- Died: 3 June 2004 (aged 86); England
- Occupation: Actor
- Years active: 1950 – 1992

Harold Goodwin (22 October 1917 – 3 June 2004) was an English actor born in Wombwell, West Riding of Yorkshire, England.

== Life and career ==
Goodwin trained at RADA and was a stage actor at Liverpool repertory theatre for three years. He appeared in numerous British films of the 1950s and 1960s, usually playing 'flat cap'-wearing working class characters from Northern England or low ranks in the military.

He had significant parts in the war films The Dam Busters (playing Guy Gibson's batman, 'Crosby'), Bridge on the River Kwai and The Longest Day. He can also be seen in films such as The Ladykillers, Sea of Sand, Angels One Five and The Cruel Sea (in which he was the ASDIC operator).

Goodwin made hundreds of appearances in British television programmes such as Minder (as Dunning, episode Get Daley!, 1984) and a notable role in All Creatures Great and Small. Goodwin was a 'staple' of the popular 1980s sitcom, That's My Boy, and United!.

His last major television appearance was playing the part of Joss Shackleton, father to Vera Duckworth, in the ITV soap opera Coronation Street in 1991. His final television appearance was as a window cleaner in One Foot in the Grave in 1992.

Goodwin died on 3 June 2004, at the age of 86.

== Selected filmography ==
- Young and Innocent (1937) – Driver of the pig-cart (uncredited)
- The Happiest Days of Your Life (1950) – Edwin
- Dance Hall (1950) – Jack
- The Magnet (1950) – Pin-Table Attendant
- The Galloping Major (1951) – Street Stall Owner (uncredited)
- The Man in the White Suit (1951) – Wilkins
- Appointment with Venus (1951) – 2nd Naval Rating
- Green Grow the Rushes (1951) – Gosling
- The Last Page (1952) – Frank the Waiter (uncredited)
- Judgment Deferred (1952)
- The Card (1952) – John (uncredited)
- Angels One Five (1952) – A.C. 2 Wailes
- The Cruel Sea (1953) – ASDIC Operator
- Grand National Night (1953)
- The Million Pound Note (1954) – Horace (uncredited)
- The Gay Dog (1954) – Bert Gay
- The Harassed Hero (1954) – Twigg
- The Ship That Died of Shame (1955) – Second Customs Officer
- A Kid for Two Farthings (1955) – Chick Man (uncredited)
- The Dam Busters (1955) – Wing Comdr. Gibson's Batman, Crosby
- The Ladykillers (1955) – Parcels Clerk (uncredited)
- You Lucky People! (1955) – Pvt. Rossiter
- Now and Forever (1956) – Lorry driver
- Who Done It? (1956) – Pringle (uncredited)
- Charley Moon (1956) – Sid
- The Long Arm (1956) – Official at Somerset House
- The Last Man to Hang? (1956) – Cheed
- Zarak (1956) – Sgt. Higgins
- Three Men in a Boat (1956) – Maze Keeper (Maze)
- Carry On Admiral (1957) – Parker (uncredited)
- Sea Wife (1957) – Daily Telegraph Clerk
- The Prince and the Showgirl (1957) – Call Boy
- The Bridge on the River Kwai (1957) – Baker
- Barnacle Bill (1957) – Duckworth
- Law and Disorder (1958) – Blacky
- Girls at Sea (1958) – Wal
- Sea of Sand (1958) – Road Watch
- The Square Peg (1958) – (uncredited)
- Quatermass and the Pit (1958) - Corporal Gibson
- The Captain's Table (1959) – Matthews (uncredited)
- The Mummy (1959) – Pat
- The Ugly Duckling (1959)
- Wrong Number (1959) – Bates
- Sink the Bismarck! (1960) – Airman in Phone Montage (uncredited)
- Operation Cupid (1960) – Mervyn
- The Bulldog Breed (1960) – Streaky Hopkinson
- The Terror of the Tongs (1961)
- Nearly a Nasty Accident (1961) – Aircraft Mechanic
- On the Fiddle (1961) – Corporal Reeves
- Never Back Losers (1961) – Floyd
- Scotland Yard (film series) - (1961) - The Square Mile Murder - Fingers McLeod
- Hair of the Dog (1962) – Percy
- Crooks Anonymous (1962) – George
- The Traitors (1962) – Edwards
- The Phantom of the Opera (1962) – Bill
- The Longest Day (1962) – British Soldier (uncredited)
- The Fast Lady (1962)
- Number Six (1962)
- The Hi-Jackers (1963) – Scouse
- The Comedy Man (1964) – Second Assistant Director
- The Curse of the Mummy's Tomb (1964) – Fred
- Die, Monster, Die! (1965) – Taxi Driver (UK version)
- United! (1965-66) - Trainer
- Don't Raise the Bridge, Lower the River (1968) – Six-Eyes Wiener
- Frankenstein Must Be Destroyed (1969) – Burglar (uncredited)
- The Bushbaby (1969) – Steward
- Some Will, Some Won't (1970) – Williams
- Sykes (1974) – Bus Driver
- All Creatures Great and Small (1975) – Dinsdale's Uncle
- Oh No It's Selwyn Froggitt (1976–1977, TV Series) – Harry
- Jabberwocky (1977) – 1st Peasant
- Rosie (1981) - Councillor Blake
- One Foot in the Grave (1992, TV Series) – Window cleaner
