= List of Coronation Street characters introduced in 1968 =

== Monica Sutton ==
Monica Sutton
- Coronation Street character
- Portrayed by: Angela Pleasence
- First appearance: 1 January 1968; Episode 735
- Last appearance: 10 January 1968; Episode 738
- Introduced by: Michael Cox
In-universe information
- Father: Ernie Sutton
- Sisters: Jenny Sutton

Monica Sutton, porrtayed by Angela Pleasence is the sister of Jenny Sutton (Mitzi Rogers), who came to Weatherfield from London as part of a hippy commute. Monica ran away from her home, a fourth-floor flat near Battersea Power Station, where she was raised as part of a family of nine.

== Jenny Sutton ==
Jenny Sutton
- Coronation Street character
- Portrayed by: Mitzi Rogers
- First appearance: 8 January 1968; Episode 737
- Last appearance: 12 June 1968; Episode 782
- Introduced by: Michael Cox
In-universe information
- Father: Ernie Sutton
- Sisters: Monica Sutton
- Husband: Dennis Tanner (1968–1974)

Jennifer Louise "Jenny" Tanner (née Sutton) was the first wife of Dennis Tanner.

Jenny was raised in a family of nine at a fourth-floor flat near Battersea Power Station. In 1968, the attractive young blonde arrived in Weatherfield from London in search of her sister Monica, who had written to her telling her that she was staying with Dennis who was "a bit square but a nice guy". Monica was in fact part of Robert Croft's hippy commune camping out at 11 Coronation Street. After being put onto Dennis, Jenny joined the hippies even though she thought they were crazy. When the hippies moved on, Jenny remained and Dennis got her a job at the hotel where he was employed as a barman. Whilst there she had to fend off the unwanted advances of waiter Maurice Rowe, and when Dennis stood up for her he realised his affection for her. Jenny knew that Dennis liked her but returned to the South anyway. Dennis followed her and they became a couple while in London.

In March, they returned to Weatherfield and Jenny met Dennis's mother Elsie. Elsie gave them a hard time - they pretended to be married so she'd let them sleep together, but Jenny came clean with Elsie (although she'd seen through Dennis's lie anyway) and Elsie made Dennis sleep in the parlour. Elsie didn't take their relationship seriously as Dennis had never had a long-term relationship, and made Jenny feel unwelcome. When Jenny brought this up with Dennis, he told Elsie to be nicer to Jenny but things didn't improve so Jenny decided to return to London. To stop her, Dennis persuaded Minnie Caldwell to take her in at No.5, though they were surprised that the kindly pensioner was just as uncompromising about letting them sleep together as Elsie was. Minnie did, however, have a go at Elsie and make her realise how badly she was treating Jenny. After a few weeks Jenny got a job as a demonstrator at Ashworths, selling kitchen equipment. Jenny and Dennis decided to get engaged - although it was badly timed as Monica had also just got engaged, and their father Ernie refused to pay for two weddings. As Monica was marrying a bank manager, Ernie supported that union and Dennis had to borrow money to pay for his and Jenny's nuptials.

Jenny and Dennis got married on 29 May. During his bridegroom's speech, Dennis confessed to Jenny that he had to be in Bristol that evening to see his boss. Jenny didn't mind. It turned out to be a good move. as Dennis's boss was so impressed with his devotion to the company that he offered Dennis the position of area manager, based in Bristol. Jenny got a transfer at Ashworths and the Tanners moved. Before leaving Weatherfield, Jenny conspired with Linda Cheveski, to have Elsie's nephew Gary Bailey go to Weatherfield to keep Elsie company.

The Tanners were happily married until 1973 when Dennis was sent to prison for posing as a salesman in a scam to con old age pensioners. Jenny decided to make a clean break and start a new life, refusing to see Dennis or Elsie. Meeting with Ernie, Elsie blamed Jenny for what had happened to Dennis and couldn't believe that Jenny wasn't in on the scam or that she at least knew about it. Ernie insisted that the Tanners' marriage was now over and Jenny was having nothing to do with Dennis in future. Jenny and Dennis later divorced and she has not been seen or heard from since.

== Maggie Cooke ==
Maggie Cooke
- Coronation Street character
- Portrayed by: Irene Sutcliffe
- Duration: 1968–1975
- First appearance: 1 April 1968; Episode 761
- Last appearance: 13 January 1975; Episode 1459
- Introduced by: Michael Cox (1968); Susi Hush (1974)
In-universe information
- Occupation: Shop owner Morphine worker
- Father: Harold Preston
- Mother: Margaret Preston
- Sisters: Betty Williams
- Husband: Les Clegg (until 1970); Ron Cooke (from 1974)
- Adoptive sons: Gordon Clegg
- Uncles: Jim
- Aunts: Maud; Ethel
- Nephews: Gordon Clegg

Maggie Cooke (also Preston and Clegg) is played by Irene Sutcliffe. She ran the corner shop from 1968 to 1974. Maggie's storylines included her life with alcoholic husband Les Clegg (John Sharp), whom she divorced in 1969, her adoptive son Gordon (Bill Kenwright), her sister Betty Turpin (Betty Driver) was his birth mother, and a further marriage to reformed alcoholic, Ron Cooke (Eric Lander), on 10 July 1974. She emigrated to Zaire after the wedding but made a brief return to the street in December of the same year when Gordon found out that Betty was his mother. She rejoined her husband the following month and has not returned to the street since.

In 2003, she was still living in the Democratic Republic of the Congo (which Zaire had become). In 2012, when her sister Betty died, Maggie was not at the funeral or mentioned. A photograph of her was seen on the shelf in the background when Gordon, Emily Bishop (Eileen Derbyshire), Rita Sullivan (Barbara Knox) and Stella Price (Michelle Collins) went to Betty's house to sort through her belongings.

In 2019, a writer from Soap World included Maggie and Ron's ceremony in their feature profiling soap weddings. They wrote "this marriage was sparked by a response to a lonely hearts ad in a newspaper!"

== Les Clegg ==
Les Clegg
- Coronation Street character
- Portrayed by: John Sharp
- First appearance: 1 April 1968; Episode 761
- Last appearance: 12 June 1968; Episode 782
- Introduced by: Michael Cox
In-universe information
- Wife: Maggie Preston (until 1970)
- Adoptive sons: Gordon Clegg

Les Clegg is played by John Sharp. He and his wife Maggie (Irene Sutcliffe) buy the Corner Shop from David Barlow (Alan Rothwell) in 1968. Les was an alcoholic, and this leads to the breakdown of their marriage; Maggie divorces Les in 1970. According to Betty Turpin (Betty Driver), Les died sometime before Maggie's wedding to Ron Cooke.

== Gordon Clegg ==
Gordon Clegg
- Coronation Street character
- Portrayed by: Bill Kenwright (1968–1995, 2012); Geoffrey Leesley (2002–2004)
- Duration: 1968–1969, 1974–1976, 1982, 1995, 2002, 2004, 2012
- First appearance: 15 April 1968; Episode 765
- Last appearance: 20 April 2012; Episode 7849
- Introduced by: Michael Cox (1968); Susi Hush (1974, 1975); Bill Podmore (1976, 1982); Sue Pritchard (1995); Jane MacNaught (2002); Kieran Roberts (2004); Phil Collinson (2012)
In-universe information
- Father: Ted Farrell
- Mother: Betty Williams
- Adoptive father: Les Clegg
- Adoptive mother: Maggie Cooke
- Stepfather: Billy Williams (1995–1997)
- Wife: Caroline Wilson (1982–present)
- Sons: Peter Clegg
- Grandfathers: Harold Preston
- Grandmothers: Margaret Preston
- Aunts: Maggie Cooke

Gordon Clegg (also Preston), played by Bill Kenwright, made his first on-screen appearance on 15 April 1968. Kenwright played the role until 1995 and Geoffrey Leesley took over from 2002-04. On 31 January 2012, Sharon Marshall revealed Kenwright would reprise his role as Gordon for Betty Williams' (Betty Driver) funeral, which was broadcast in April that year.

In 1968, Les Clegg (John Sharp) bought the Corner Shop and the Cleggs moved there, with Gordon living in the flat above the shop. Maggie wanted Gordon to focus on his studies and not work behind the counter so Maggie was dismayed when Gordon fell for young Lucille Hewitt (Jennifer Moss). Lucille took some convincing to agree to go out with Gordon, as she thought he was too mothered by Maggie, but he impressed her when he fought for her attentions with Gary Strauss ([Callen Angelo) and Ray Langton (Neville Buswell). Gordon and Lucille faced Maggie's objections when Gordon decided to show Lucille that he was committed to her by suggesting that they elope to Gretna Green and return as husband and wife, even though it would mean missing his exams. He and Lucille went to the railway station, without telling their families but when they missed their train; Lucille convinced him that they should return. Gordon passed his exams and began thinking about his career prospects. As Lucille pressed ahead with wedding preparations and set a date for Easter Saturday 1969, Gordon realised he could not marry her and cancelled the wedding. Ashamed of his actions, he took a job at the head office of an accountancy firm in London and upset Maggie by moving there permanently.

In 1971, Gordon became engaged to Jennifer Swann. She visited Weatherfield to meet Maggie but she and Gordon did not marry. Gordon returned to Weatherfield in 1974 for Maggie and Ron Cooke's wedding. Gordon gave Maggie away and saw her off as she moved to Zaire with Ron. Gordon agreed to handle the sale of the shop but arranged to rent it to Megan "Granny" Hopkins for £14 a week, with the money counting towards the eventual sale to the Hopkins'. Before returning to London, he infuriated Betty by having a one-night stand with Beverley Mather (Sue Cornell). The Hopkins' were determined to get a good deal on the shop and they found Gordon's birth certificate behind a sideboard, revealing his true mother's name. Granny Hopkins was intending to blackmail Gordon but Maggie told him the truth before the Hopkins' could. Gordon was stunned by the news and reacted initially by warning the Hopkins', who did a midnight flit, and going out to celebrate the fact that Les was not his father. After getting over the initial shock, he began treating Betty as his mother. In 1976, Gordon visited to arrange the sale of the shop to Renee Bradshaw (Madge Hindle).

In 1982, Gordon married Caroline Wilson (Sarah Thurstan) and they had a son, Peter, in 1985. In 1995, Gordon gave Betty away when she married wartime romance, Billy Williams (Frank Mills). As Billy was an old flame of Betty's, Gordon wondered if he could be his father but Betty said that he was not. When Betty decided to retire in 2002, Gordon invited her to live with him and his family in Wimbledon, although Caroline was not keen on the idea. After some consideration, Betty decided to stay in Weatherfield as she enjoyed working too much. Gordon suggested it again the following year after Betty's house caught fire, but she did not stay with them long. In 2004, Gordon visited Betty and brought her flowers for her eighty-fourth birthday.

Betty continued to visit Gordon for many more years, including Christmases. In 2012, he visited her when she was ill but learnt that she had died. Devastated, Gordon went to The Rovers Return to tell her friends. He planned to have her buried at a cemetery in London, but seeing how loved Betty was, he decided the right thing to do was have her buried next to Cyril in Weatherfield. Gordon went through her things with Emily Bishop (Eileen Derbyshire), Rita Sullivan (Barbara Knox) and The Rovers landlady Stella Price (Michelle Collins). They found a letter written by former landlady Annie Walker (Doris Speed) which revealed that she wanted Betty to run the pub after she retired, but Stella did not want Gordon to know until she saw a solicitor. On the day of the funeral, they told Gordon about the letter but he knew that his mother was happy working at the pub although she had turned down the offer. At the wake in The Rovers Return, he read a letter from Betty, thanking all her friends for all the good years. Gordon handed barman Sean Tully (Antony Cotton) another letter from Betty, containing her secret hotpot recipe. Gordon said goodbye before departing later in the evening.

== Dickie Fleming ==
Dickie Fleming
- Coronation Street character
- Portrayed by: Nigel Humphreys
- Duration: 1968–1970
- First appearance: 5 June 1968; Episode 780
- Last appearance: 6 May 1970; Episode 977
- Introduced by: Richard Doubleday
In-universe information
- Wife: Audrey Bright (1968–1972)

Dickie Fleming is played by Nigel Humphreys. Eighteen-year-old Dickie, and his fiancé Audrey Bright (Gillian McCann) move into number three shortly before they wed in 1968. The following year, the Flemings took Ray Langton (Neville Buswell) as a lodger and Dickie became jealous as Ray and Audrey flirted with one another. Audrey later fell for Ray and when Dickie confronted her, she admitted she no longer loved him. Rejected, Dickie informed Ray's fiancé Sandra Butler (Patricia Fuller) of what had been going on, before leaving Weatherfield for good.

== Audrey Fleming ==
Audrey Fleming
- Coronation Street character
- Portrayed by: Gillian McCann
- Duration: 1968–1970
- First appearance: 5 June 1968; Episode 780
- Last appearance: 13 May 1970; Episode 979
- Introduced by: Richard Doubleday
In-universe information
- Father: Arthur Bright
- Mother: Freda Bright
- Husband: Dickie Fleming (1968–1972)
- First cousins: Vicki Bright

Audrey Fleming (also Bright) is played by Gillian McCann. Shortly after arriving, 16-year-old Audrey married Dickie Fleming (Nigel Humphries) and they set up home at number three. In 1969, the Flemings took Ray Langton (Neville Buswell) as lodger and Audrey enjoyed a flirtation with Ray, leading Dickie to become jealous and throw him out, before having a change of heart. Ray and Audrey became closer and he was about to make his move before a coach accident lost him to use of his legs.

Ray instead took a liking to new girl in the area Sandra Butler (Patricia Fuller), who liked to care for him, and they became engaged. As Ray recovered, his and Audrey's attraction grew and Audrey fell in love with him. Eventually, Dickie confronted Audrey and she admitted she no longer loved him, she had fallen for Ray. Feeling rejected, Dickie took revenge in telling Sandra what had been going on before he left the area. Ray was committed to Sandra however, and after stringing her along and effectively ending her marriage, he let her down and Audrey fled Weatherfield.

== Gary Bailey ==
Gary Bailey
- Coronation Street character
- Portrayed by: Warren Clarke
- First appearance: 17 June 1968; Episode 783
- Last appearance: 26 June 1969; Episode 786
- Introduced by: Richard Doubleday
In-universe information
- Father: Roy Bailey
- Mother: Phyllis Bailey
- Grandfathers: Arthur Grimshaw
- Grandmothers: Alice Grimshaw
- Uncles: Jack Grimshaw
- Aunts: Elsie Tanner; Fay Butler; Ethel Bailey
- First cousins: Dennis Tanner; Linda Cheveski; Sandra Butler; Bernard Butler
- Other relatives: Paul Cheveski; Martin Cheveski; Arnley Grimshaw; Colin Grimshaw; Eileen Grimshaw; Julie Carp; Jason Grimshaw; Todd Grimshaw; Billy Platt

Gary Bailey was Elsie Tanner's (Pat Phoenix) nephew, the son of her sister Phyllis.

In June 1968, Linda Cheveski (Anne Cunningham) and Jenny Tanner (Mitzi Rogers) sent Gary to Weatherfield to keep Elsie company as her son Dennis (Philip Lowrie) had just moved to Bristol and she was now on her own. Gary arrived from down south where he had been staying for three months with his Auntie Ethel, who had recently suffered a nervous breakdown. Elsie had not seen Gary since he was 11 years old, and was interested to hear that although Gary's father was still alive, Phyllis was now on her third husband.

Gary tried to interest the residents in investing; he made Stan Ogden (Bernard Youens) £8 by buying and selling a chair, but Elsie was not quite so impressed when he used £200 that she had loaned him to buy her a white Jaguar, as she could not drive. Gary left Weatherfield in the Jaguar a week later, before Elsie could sell it; she had crashed it into Ken Barlow's (William Roache) car while trying to get to grips with the vehicle. Gary had been with her, but bailed out as her reckless driving terrified him.

== Effie Spicer ==
Effie Spicer
- Coronation Street character
- Portrayed by: Ann Dyson
- Duration: 1968–1969
- First appearance: 26 June 1968; Episode 786
- Last appearance: 26 March 1969; Episode 862
- Introduced by: Richard Doubleday (1968); John Finch (1968)

Effie Spicer is played by Ann Dyson. She moved into the new maisonettes that were built after the Glad Tidings Mission Hall was demolished in 1968. During her time on Coronation Street, she clashed on many occasions with her neighbour Ena Sharples (Violet Carson). Effie left the street in 1969.

== Alice Pickens ==
Alice Pickens
- Coronation Street character
- Portrayed by: Doris Hare
- Duration: 1968–1969
- First appearance: 18 November 1968; Episode 825
- Last appearance: 1 September 1969; Episode 906
- Introduced by: John Finch (1968); H.V. Kershaw (1969)
In-universe information
- Sons: Douglas Pickens

Alice Pickens is played by Doris Hare. She appears in the series between 1968 and 1969. She became engaged to Albert Tatlock but the marriage was called off.
