= List of Coronation Street characters introduced in 1965 =

In 1965, sixteen new characters made their debuts on Coronation Street, including twins Peter and Susan Barlow, who arrived as newborn infants, the children of Coronation Street original character and stalwart Ken Barlow.

== Edward Wormold ==
Edward Wormold
- Coronation Street character
- Portrayed by: Robert Dorning
- Duration: 1965
- First appearance: 4 January 1965; Episode 424
- Last appearance: 1 September 1965; Episode 493
- Created by: H.V. Kershaw
- Introduced by: John Finch
In-universe information
- Brothers: Alfried Wormwold
- Sons: Douglas Wormold

Edward Wormold is the owner of several properties on Coronation Street up until the late 70s. As such, he makes occasional visits when needed. Gradually all the houses are bought by the residents of the Street, and Wormold last appears in September. His brother Alfried appears in 1967 and son Douglas appears in 1974.

== Norman Lindley ==
Norman Lindley
- Coronation Street character
- Portrayed by: Glyn Owen
- Duration: 1965
- First appearance: 8 February 1965; Episode 434
- Last appearance: 2 June 1965; Episode 467
- Created by: Richard Everitt
- Introduced by: Jim Allen
In-universe information
- Wife: Florrie Lindley

Norman Lindley is the estranged husband of shopkeeper Florrie Lindley. His arrival shocks Florrie's friends and neighbours, who had believed she was widowed. Norman works overseas as an engineer and has returned to the country to ask Florrie for a divorce. Whilst in the area he takes a fancy to Elsie Tanner and they date, but when Florrie confesses she still has feelings for Norman, Elsie gallantly breaks it off. Florrie has her hopes of rekindling the romance dashed however, when Norman is called back to work and abruptly leaves. The couple finally decides to give their marriage another go when Norman comes back for Florrie later in the year, and they leave for a new start together.

== Roger Wain ==
Roger Wain
- Coronation Street character
- Portrayed by: Frazer Hines
- Duration: 1965
- First appearance: 15 March 1965; Episode 444
- Last appearance: 21 June 1965; Episode 472
- Created by: H.V. Kershaw
- Introduced by: Vince Powell

Roger Wain is a friend of Lucille Hewitt's, whom she meets when the play opposite each other in a local production. Lucille instantly takes a shine to Roger and takes him home to meet her guardians Annie and Jack, who approve of the developing relationship between the pair. Eventually however, class differences prove too much for Roger and Lucille, and they drift apart.

== Lionel Petty ==
Lionel Petty
- Coronation Street character
- Portrayed by: Edward Evans
- Duration: 1965–1966
- First appearance: 31 May 1965; Episode 466
- Last appearance: 26 January 1966; Episode 535
- Created by: Howard Baker
- Introduced by: Jack Rosenthal
In-universe information
- Wife: Mary Petty (deceased)
- Daughters: Sandra Petty

Lionel Petty arrives on Coronation Street as the new owner of the Corner Shop, which he previously bought from Florrie Lindley. He is an ex-Sergeant Major, and life as a shopkeeper is never his game. Lionel fails to fit in on the Street and leaves for Wales in January 1966 to go into business with his brother.

== Sid Lambert ==
Sid Lambert
- Coronation Street character
- Portrayed by: Graham Rigby
- Duration: 1965–1966, 1970
- First appearance: 31 May 1965; Episode 466
- Last appearance: 19 August 1970; Episode 999
- Created by: Howard Baker
- Introduced by: Jack Rosenthal

Sid Lambert is the manager of the local football club where David Barlow takes a job as coach until David's knee injury forces him out.

He returns briefly in 1970, after doing some work for Alan Howard and is angry when Alan is unable to pay him. Sid threatens to sue Alan, along with several other people to whom Alan owes money (namely Annie Walker, Irma Barlow, Joe Makinson and Willie Piggott), if he does not pay them what they are owed. Alan's accountant asks Sid to give Alan time to come up with the money. Sid is reluctant but is outvoted by the other creditors. He asks Alan's accountant to provide evidence that Alan's hairdressing salon in Leeds is actually owned by his ex-wife.

== Tom Schofield ==
Tom Schofield
- Coronation Street character
- Portrayed by: David Holliday
- Duration: 1965, 1973
- First appearance: 7 June 1965; Episode 468
- Last appearance: 30 May 1973; Episode 1291
- Created by: Howard Baker
- Introduced by: John Finch
In-universe information
- Father: Tom Schofield
- Sisters: Joan Schofield; Alison Schofield
- Wife: Faye-Marie Schofield
- Grandfathers: Tom Schofield
- Uncles: Clifford Schofield
- Other relatives: Ena Sharples; Alice Raybould; Vera Lomax; Madge Sharples; Ian Sharples; Colin Lomax; Jason Lomax

Tom Schofield is Ena Sharples's great-nephew, grandson of her brother Tom who emigrated to the US in 1912.

The elder Tom has raised a family in the US, fathering a son also named Tom who has had three children, including Tom. Having lost touch with his family in Weatherfield not long after leaving the country, the elder Tom asks his grandson to find Ena and persuade her to come and stay at his log cabin between Omaha and Sioux City, Nebraska, putting up the air fare himself, when the latter is due in the UK for work purposes. The younger Tom works for a travel agent in Omaha, who does package tours of Europe and he has been dispatched to the UK to check out the hotels.

In order to trace Ena, Tom uses a firm of solicitors who put an ad in a local Weatherfield paper asking her to contact them, using her maiden name and last known address of 65 Inkerman Street. Ena, now a widow and living in the vestry of the Glad Tidings Mission Hall, sees the ad and gets in touch. She is informed only that someone would soon contact her and has no idea who is behind the ad until Tom turns up at her door.

Ena is very happy to learn that her brother is alive and well and still thinks about her. Tom acquaints her with the Schofield line going back to her brother and reads a letter from him in which he talks about his childhood memories of her, which moves her to tears. Startled to receive the invitation to visit him, Ena wavers on accepting as she is set in her ways and is fearful about flying for the first time. It is only when Annie Walker scoffs at the very idea of her going to America that she announces she is taking up her brother's offer.

Tom is in the area a little while longer before flying home with Ena. In that time he samples Ena's Lancashire hotpot, and defends her when Lionel Petty confronts her over a neighbourhood boycott of the Corner Shop she's enacted. He also has a minor spat with Len Fairclough when Elsie Tanner accepts a drink from Tom causing a jealous Len to walk out of the Rovers Return Inn.

Over the next eight years, Tom marries Faye-Marie and settles in Manchester, Connecticut. In 1973, Tom and Faye-Marie plan a visit to the UK to see the Manchester Festival. A week before they leave, Ena's brother Tom dies in his sleep; Tom and Faye-Marie deliver this news to Ena in person upon their arrival in Weatherfield. Ena takes the news well, finding comfort in the fact that he hadn't suffered.

Tom is not interested in sight-seeing and spends most of the three-week stay in Coronation Street, socialising with Ena's friends and neighbours. He also helps out at the Community Centre's Manchester Festival day by serving at the juice counter. On most of these occasions, he is not accompanied by his wife. A notable exception is the Street outing to Woburn Abbey. Tom makes the most of the visit by bringing along his camera and taking photographs of the animals at Woburn Safari Park. He and Faye-Marie are delighted when Ena introduces them to The Duke of Bedford.

Unlike her husband, Faye-Marie loves to visit new places and wants to experience as much British culture and history as she can. She fancies herself an intellectual and seeks out others for the type of stimulating conversation she does not get from Tom. Despite this, their marriage is a happy one. While in Weatherfield, she latches onto Ken Barlow, a fellow liberal-minded teacher. Their attachment worries Ena, who asks Tom and Faye-Marie why they hardly spend any time together. Tom explains to her that they had an open marriage, which concerns her all the more. Faye-Marie and Ken convince Ena that they are only friends and when Tom demonstrates faith in his wife, Ena accepts that their marriage works for them, even if she does not understand it. The Schofields later return home.

== Arthur Walker ==
Arthur Walker
- Coronation Street character
- Portrayed by: Jack Allen
- Duration: 1965, 1969
- First appearance: 30 June 1965; Episode 475
- Last appearance: 5 November 1969; Episode 925
- Created by: Howard Baker
- Introduced by: H.V. Kershaw (1965); Malcolm Lynch (1969)
In-universe information
- Father: Amos Walker
- Mother: Joan Walker
- Brothers: Jack Walker; Jim Walker
- Wife: Cissie Pickles (1932–????)
- Nephews: Billy Walker
- Nieces: Joan Davies

Arthur Walker is the brother of Jack Walker who often runs the Rovers while Jack and his wife Annie are indisposed. He makes his last appearance in 1969, visiting Jack in hospital after he is injured in the coach crash. Arthur takes on the characteristics previously shown by their brother Jim Walker.

== Clara Midgeley ==
Clara Midgeley
- Coronation Street character
- Portrayed by: Betty Hardy
- Duration: 1965–1966
- First appearance: 26 July 1965; Episode 482
- Last appearance: 14 April 1966; Episode 557
- Created by: H.V. Kershaw
- Introduced by: Jack Rosenthal
In-universe information
- Occupation: Cleaner

Clara Midgeley is the caretaker employed at the Mission in the absence of regular employee Ena Sharples. During her stay on the Street she makes good friends with Albert Tatlock and the pair holiday together in Cleveleys, with Albert unaware that Clara has previously disclosed to Minnie Caldwell that she is in fact falling in love with him. On the trip Clara decides to propose marriage to Albert, but is disappointed when he turns her down, reasoning that he is far too set in his ways to ever marry again. Following this, Albert cuts the holiday short to return home and Clara, devastated, is never seen again.

== Nellie Harvey ==
Nellie Harvey
- Coronation Street character
- Portrayed by: Mollie Sugden
- Duration: 1965, 1971–1974, 1976
- First appearance: 28 July 1965; Episode 483
- Last appearance: 4 August 1976; Episode 1623
- Created by: H.V. Kershaw
- Introduced by: Jack Rosenthal
In-universe information
- Husband: Arthur Harvey
- Daughters: Tina Harvey

Nellie Harvey appears intermittently from 1965 to 1976. She and her husband Arthur are landlord and lady of The Laughing Donkey, another local pub in Weatherfield. Nellie was a member of the Weatherfield Ladies Licensed Victualers. She is a lifelong 'friend' of Annie Walker but in reality they are always trying to score points off each other.

== Ted Bates ==
Ted Bates
- Coronation Street character
- Portrayed by: William Wymar
- Duration: 1965
- First appearance: 18 August 1965; Episode 489
- Last appearance: 1 September 1965; Episode 493
- Created by: Howard Baker
- Introduced by: Adele Rose

Ted Bates is an old friend of Albert Tatlock's who moves into No.1 to escape the old folks' home his daughter had packed him off to. Albert and Ted fights for his rights to stay, but his daughter gets the authorities involved and a defeated Ted returns to the home.

== Bob Maxwell ==
Bob Maxwell
- Coronation Street character
- Portrayed by: Donald Hewlett
- Duration: 1965
- First appearance: 13 September 1965; Episode 496
- Last appearance: 20 September 1965; Episode 497
- Created by: Howard Baker
- Introduced by: Jack Rosenthal
In-universe information
- Wife: Moira Maxwell

Robert "Bob" Maxwell is a solicitor whom Elsie Tanner meets in the Fox and Hound pub during a desperate attempt to find love outside of Coronation Street. After a night of flirting, Bob drives Elsie home, and on the way they stop in a lay-by where he tells her how unhappy he is in his marriage. Once they drive off, Bob suffers a fatal heart attack and crashes the car. Panicked, Elsie flees the scene but the police track her down soon enough and she is forced to give evidence.

== Moira Maxwell ==
Moira Maxwell
- Coronation Street character
- Portrayed by: Ann Castle
- Duration: 1965–1966
- First appearance: 4 October 1965; Episode 502
- Last appearance: 24 October 1966; Episode 612
- Created by: Howard Baker
- Introduced by: Ron McDonnell
In-universe information
- Husband: Bob Maxwell

Moira Maxwell is married to Bob Maxwell, who dies while taking Elsie Tanner home. Moira attacks Elsie at the Coroner's Court hearing, accusing her of luring her husband away.

== Jim Mount ==
Jim Mount
- Coronation Street character
- Portrayed by: Barry Keagan
- Duration: 1965–1966
- First appearance: 22 November 1965; Episode 516
- Last appearance: 27 April 1966; Episode 561
- Created by: Howard Baker
- Introduced by: Peter Eckersley

Jim Mount is an Irish engineer who briefly flirts with Elsie Tanner before moving into No.13 with the Ogdens. He is overjoyed when his old girlfriend Brenda Riley is installed as manageress at the Rovers in the temporary absence of the Walkers, but she refuses to resume their relationship and goes out with Len Fairclough instead. Brenda and Jim eventually leave Weatherfield together after the Walkers return to find the Rovers in disarray.

== Frank Turner ==
Frank Turner
- Coronation Street character
- Portrayed by: Tom Watson
- Duration: 1965
- First appearance: 8 December 1965; Episode 521
- Last appearance: 20 December 1965; Episode 524
- Created by: Howard Baker
- Introduced by: Vince Powell

Frank Turner is a customer of the Rovers who blackmails Jack Walker when he finds underage Lucille Hewitt managing the bar in his absence. Frank demands money for his silence and the strain causes Jack to collapse. When the regulars discover what is going on they decide on teaching Frank a lesson. He is beaten up in the alleyway behind the Rovers and Stan Ogden is celebrated for his handiwork, only for them all to learn it was in fact Jerry Booth who had done the deed.
