= Stuart Wolfenden =

English actor (born 1970)

- Born: Stuart Wolfenden; 7 February 1970 (age 56); Rochdale, Lancashire, England
- Occupation: Actor
- Years active: 1982–present
- Height: 5 ft 9 in (1.75 m)

Stuart Wolfenden (born 7 February 1970) is an English actor. He has played three different roles in Coronation Street, first as paper boy Craig Russell, then as Mark Casey and later as Greig Hodge. Around 2019, he joined the cast of Hollyoaks as Terry Hay, the father of regular character Ste Hay.

== Early life and career ==
Born 7 February 1970 in Rochdale, Lancashire; Wolfenden began acting at North Chadderton School. After starring in the stage version of Kes at age 13, he won the Best Actor under 21 award at the Grange Arts Centre in Oldham. During this time he was also an actor at the Oldham Theatre Workshop. In 1986, Wolfenden appeared in "Foul Play", an episode of the BBC One children's drama Jossy's Giants. At the age of 17 he starred alongside Sean Bean and Sheila Hancock in the BBC television film My Kingdom for a Horse (1991), playing the character of Bobby Shaw. In 2004, he starred alongside Paddy Considine and Toby Kebbell in the Shane Meadows directed film Dead Man's Shoes (2004).

== Coronation Street ==
In 1986, Wolfenden appeared in Coronation Street as paperboy Craig Russell. He returned in a different role in 1989, playing Mark Casey. He remained on the show until 1991. Wolfenden returned to Coronation Street a third time in 2015, this time in the role of Greig Hodge.

== Later career ==
Wolfenden has subsequently appeared in a number of TV shows including Blue Murder, Heartbeat, and the soap opera Emmerdale, as well as landing roles in a number of feature films including In the Name of the Father (1992), Oranges and Sunshine (2011) and Best Laid Plans (2012).
