= List of Coronation Street characters introduced in 2011 =

Coronation Street is a British soap opera, produced by ITV Studios. Created by writer Tony Warren, Coronation Street was first broadcast on ITV on 9 December 1960. It has been produced by Phil Collinson since 2010.

The following is a list of characters introduced by Collinson in the show's fifty-first year, by order of first appearance. January saw three introductions; DC Moore (Pooja Shah), the detective in charge of the investigation into the attack on Tracy Barlow (Kate Ford), Marc Selby (Andrew Hall), a new love interest for both Audrey Roberts (Sue Nicholls) and Claudia Colby (Rula Lenska), and Frank Foster, played by former The Bill actor Andrew Lancel, as a new business partner for Carla Connor (Alison King). Faye Butler (Ellie Leach), the adoptive daughter of Anna (Debbie Rush) and Eddie Windass (Steve Huison), Jeff Cullen (Steven Houghton), a love interest for Sally Webster (Sally Dynevor), and the soap's first Chinese character, Xin Chiang (Elizabeth Tan), a friend of Tina McIntyre (Michelle Keegan), arrived in February. Veteran actress Stephanie Cole joined as Sylvia Goodwin, the mother of established character Roy Cropper (David Neilson), in April.

June saw a new family take over the running of the Rovers Return for the first time as former EastEnders actress Michelle Collins and Taggart actor John Michie took on the roles of Stella Price and Karl Munro respectively. The couple were also joined by Stella's daughter Eva (Catherine Tyldesley). A potential new love interest for Steve McDonald (Simon Gregson), Beth Tinker (Lisa George), and her son Craig (Colson Smith) arrived in August and Frank's parents, Anne (Gwen Taylor) and Sam Foster (Paul Clayton), made their first appearances in September, along with Kirsty Soames (Natalie Gumede), a new love interest for Tyrone Dobbs (Alan Halsall). Paul Kershaw's (Tony Hirst) Alzheimer's-suffering wife, Lesley Kershaw (Judy Holt), followed in October and Jeremy Sheffield began appearing as Danny Stratton, a new love interest for Becky McDonald (Katherine Kelly), in December. That same month saw the birth of Chesney Brown (Sam Aston) and Katy Armstrong's (Georgia May Foote) newborn son Joseph Brown, the only child born that year.

== DC Moore ==
DC Moore
- Coronation Street character
- Portrayed by: Pooja Shah
- First appearance: Episode 7505; 3 January 2011
- Last appearance: Episode 7514; 14 January 2011
- Introduced by: Phil Collinson
In-universe information
- Occupation: Police Officer

Detective Constable Moore, played by Pooja Shah, is a police officer investigating the attack on Tracy Barlow (Kate Ford) on New Year's Eve. Moore is first seen at the hospital speaking to Tracy's mother Deirdre (Anne Kirkbride) and stepfather Ken (William Roache). She questions them about a motive for the attack on Tracy, to which Deirdre implicates Steve McDonald (Simon Gregson). Moore and her colleague DC Redfern (Paul Warriner) go to The Rovers Return and question Steve about his whereabouts on the night of the attack. Steve gives them an account of his movements and denies being Tracy's attacker. They later question Nick Tilsley (Ben Price), Gail McIntyre (Helen Worth) and David Platt (Jack P. Shepherd) to see if they are involved. Moore and Redfern come across Norris Cole and Mary Taylor (Malcolm Hebden and Patti Clare) in the street and ask Norris for information. Norris implicates Becky McDonald (Katherine Kelly) as a potential suspect when he reveals that she and Tracy had a fight on Christmas Day in The Rovers. Following their new lead, Moore and Redfern pay the Rovers another visit and question Becky. Tracy accuses Becky, and Becky is subsequently arrested for GBH and denies attacking Tracy. After Claire Peacock (Julia Haworth) confesses to the attack, Moore and Redfern release her on bail. The following night Moore and Redfern return to the Street to re-arrest Claire after making their enquiries. They fall for a decoy as residents help Claire escape.

== Marc Selby ==
Marc Selby
- Coronation Street character
- Portrayed by: Andrew Hall
- First appearance: Episode 7509; 7 January 2011
- Last appearance: Episode 7568; 26 August 2011
- Introduced by: Phil Collinson
In-universe information
- Occupation: Wine Dealer

Marc Selby (also Marcia Selby), played by Andrew Hall, first appears as a customer at Claudia Colby's (Rula Lenska) salon. Marc befriends Audrey Roberts (Sue Nicholls) before her haircut and Claudia accuses Audrey of chatting him up. Claudia and Marc start dating, and Claudia shows him off in The Rovers Return Inn public house when she meets Audrey for drinks a few weeks later. In March, Claudia opens up to Audrey about her worries that Marc is hiding something after cancelling several dates, and the women decide to stake out Marc's house to see what he is doing while he is supposed to be out. Claudia fears the worst when they spot another woman leaving the house. A few days later, Marc tells them that it was his sister leaving his house; but Claudia still doesn't believe him.

In April, Marc telephones Audrey from the police station asking her to pick him up. When Audrey arrives, she is shocked to not only find Marc brutally beaten up – but dressed as a woman. Back at Audrey's house, he confides in her that although he is heterosexual, as are the majority of cross-dressers, he has always felt the need to dress in women's clothes, under the alias Marcia, and that his late wife was supportive of his feelings. Audrey is very sympathetic but urges him to tell Claudia, for both their sakes. He remains reluctant.

Eventually, Marc is forced to reveal the truth to Claudia after she wrongly assumes that he is having an affair with Audrey. She doesn't take kindly to the confession and ends her relationship with Marc, disgusted by his cross-dressing. In August 2011, Kylie Platt (Paula Lane) and Eva Price (Catherine Tyldesley) spot Audrey with 'Marcia' and film them to use as blackmail against Audrey to get Kylie's job back at the salon. Despite Audrey telling Marc to keep quiet, he walks into The Rovers as Marcia leaving Audrey humiliated in front of daughter Gail (Helen Worth) and her friends. Marc makes his final appearance on 26 August 2011 after Audrey tells him that she can no longer cope with his cross-dressing.

== Frank Foster ==
Francis John "Frank" Foster, played by Andrew Lancel, made his debut screen appearance on 20 January 2011. The character and casting was announced on 23 November 2010. Frank was introduced as a business associate of Carla Connor (Alison King). Of his casting, Lancel said "I'm made up to be here. It's been a long time coming and I'm a big fan of the show so I'm thrilled. Frank looks like he's going to be fun to play, there's more to him than meets the eye, he's definitely not one-sided." Describing Frank, Lancel commented that he is "charismatic, charming and you're never quite sure what he'll do next." Frank received a nomination for Best Baddy at the 2012 Virgin Media TV Awards. He received 1.39% of the vote. Jon Wise of The People called Frank an "evil bully".

== Faye Windass ==
Faye Windass, played by Ellie Leach, made her first on screen appearance on 24 January 2011. The casting was announced in January 2011. Of her casting, her cousin, co-star Brooke Vincent, said "I am chuffed to bits for her. She has made me so happy. We are all thrilled about it and I can't wait to be with her on set to show her around." A show source added "Brooke was behind her all the way and was praying she would get the part – and after Ellie won the bosses over she couldn't contain herself. She was so pleased and happy for her. Ellie-Louise is made of the same stuff as Brooke, which means she'll fit in and get on well with everyone." Storylines involving Faye include being adopted by Anna (Debbie Rush) and Eddie Windass (Steve Huison), being hit by her mother's partner Owen Armstrong (Ian Puleston-Davies) in a controversial plot, being bullied herself and being peer pressured into bullying Simon Barlow (Alex Bain), contacting her birth father Tim Metcalfe (Joe Duttine) which ultimately leads to her falsely accusing Anna of abusing her and falling pregnant at the age of twelve and only letting best friend Craig Tinker (Colson Smith) know and struggling to cope with daughter Miley Windass (Erin, Eilah and Elsie Halliwell).

== Jeff Cullen ==
Jeff Cullen
- Coronation Street character
- Portrayed by: Steven Houghton
- First appearance: Episode 7530; 7 February 2011
- Last appearance: Episode 7730; 4 November 2011
- Introduced by: Phil Collinson
- Spin-off appearances: Just Rosie (2011)
In-universe information
- Other names: Alfie
- Occupation: Model agent

Jeff Cullen, played by Steven Houghton, first appears on 7 February 2011 when he approaches Gail McIntyre (Helen Worth) and Sally Webster (Sally Dynevor) in the Rovers and offers to buy them a drink. Gail initially shows interest in Jeff, but it soon becomes clear that Jeff is attracted to Sally, so Gail leaves them and goes home. After Gail has left, Jeff takes Sally out for dinner. A few days later, Sally finds her daughter Rosie Webster (Helen Flanagan) upset after supposedly being sacked from her job as a promotions girl on refusing to go through with a glamour modelling shoot. Sally storms round to Rosie's agency to confront her boss 'Alfie', only to discover Jeff was 'Alfie'. Jeff explains to Sally that Rosie had lied about being sacked, and she had in fact resigned from her job. Jeff has since enjoyed several dates with Sally, often ending up in the middle of public spats between Sally and her "estranged" husband Kevin Webster (Michael Le Vell). In order to win points with Sally when he witnesses her giving half the £200,000 that Kevin won on a scratchcard in March, he offers a fortnight in Paris to Sally and winds Kev up about it. When he leaves for a bit, Sally apologises to Kevin for Jeff's attitude.

In May 2011, after a long weekend in Paris with Sally, Jeff proposes to her at the Bistro, she is shocked and tells him she is in no position to remarry after everything with Kevin. Later Jeff turns up at Number 4 where Kevin is staying while he recovers, Jeff accuses Sally of still having feelings for Kevin but an annoyed Sally tells him to stop being paranoid.

Jeff reappears several months later and rekindles his relationship with Sally, despite her having had a one-night stand with Kevin. However, Sophie (Brooke Vincent) and Rosie are unhappy because they want Sally to get back together with Kevin. Rosie devises a plan to split up Jeff and Sally: she dresses in revealing lingerie when Jeff calls to the house to see her about modelling work and deliberately spills a drink on his trousers. Just as she is trying to pull Jeff's trousers off, Sally walks through the door and immediately gets the impression that Jeff has been trying to seduce Rosie. Later, Rosie is forced to admit the truth and Sally reconciles with Jeff.

After Rosie is held hostage by John Stape (Graeme Hawley) in October 2011, Jeff encourages her to do an exclusive interview with The Weatherfield Gazette to further her modelling profile. However, unbeknownst to Rosie, Jeff provides the journalist with personal information about the private lives of the Webster family, including Sophie's sexuality, Sally breast cancer battle and Kevin's affair with Molly Dobbs (Vicky Binns). When the article appears, the family are humiliated and Sally orders Jeff to leave and never return.

== Xin Proctor ==
Xin Proctor
- Coronation Street character
- Portrayed by: Elizabeth Tan
- First appearance: Episode 7535; 14 February 2011
- Last appearance: Episode 7624; 13 June 2011
- Introduced by: Phil Collinson
In-universe information
- Occupation: Waitress
- Husband: Graeme Proctor (2011–)

Xin Proctor (née Chiang), played by Elizabeth Tan, is a friend of Tina McIntyre (Michelle Keegan) and is the first Chinese character to feature in a regular role on Coronation Street. She makes her first appearance on 14 February 2011, and departed the series on 13 June 2011.

=== Development ===
Former Doctor Who actress Elizabeth Tan won the role of Xin and began filming on 10 January. Tan said of her casting: "I was very excited to be offered a role on Coronation Street because it's such an iconic show with such a lot of talented actors".

The UK Border Agency has praised Coronation Street for highlighting the issue of sham marriages in its latest storyline. Eddy Montgomery – North-West regional director of the UKBA – told the newspaper: "We are pleased to see the profile of our work raised and to see this sort of storyline being featured in the media. We have been really happy to work closely with Granada on this, as we have seen this cynical crime in action in the region."

=== Storylines ===
Xin is introduced as a 19-year-old waitress friend of Tina McIntyre's, who works at the Royal Panda restaurant. She is first mentioned by Tina on 11 February 2011 when Tina says that Xin got the job that she applied for at The Royal Panda. On Valentine's Day Graeme (Craig Gazey) and Tina go to the restaurant and meet Xin who is upset as she is getting very little pay and can not cope with all the bills she has to pay. They invite her to live with them, but after Dev Alahan finds out, he tells them if Xin moves in they will have to pay an extra £200, so Xin turns down the offer and leaves to go back to her flat.

She is next seen on 4 March 2011, when Graeme and Tina and David Platt (Jack P. Shepherd) go to the restaurant where she is working at, Xin tells them she is not allowed to talk to them after what happened last time so they then leave. Later that day Kylie Turner (Paula Lane) suggests that Xin marry a British citizen. So Tina and Graeme stage a break up so Xin can marry Graeme.

In March 2011, Xin and Graeme invite Emily Bishop (Eileen Derbyshire) and Norris Cole (Malcolm Hebden) for dinner and decorate the flat with Christmas decorations in order for people to believe they had a past and they then ask Norris and Emily to pose for a picture which they do. On 8 April 2011, Xin and Graeme are married before friends and neighbours, despite Norris's pledge to halt proceedings when he finds out about the sham. Tina persuades Norris to keep quiet until after the service, but she can't stop him from telling Rita Sullivan (Barbara Knox), who is hurt by Tina's lies but promises not to tell anyone their secret as long as no one asks. Norris, however, makes no such promise. A few weeks later, Graeme and Xin receive a letter through the post informing them they are due a visit from an immigration official. He arrives the next day and interviews the couple separately about each other and their time together.

As they spend more time together, an attraction begins to form between the married couple. In June, after a staged argument at Xin's leaving party becomes all too real, Xin and Graeme admit their feelings to each other, before kissing and sleeping together. A conflicted Graeme then tries to patch things up with Tina before asking Xin for a divorce. However, Graeme could not fight his feelings for Xin and so he dumps Tina. Tina is angrily heartbroken and throws all of Xin and Graeme's things out on to the street. Xin and Graeme are then forced to stay at David's mother Gail's (Helen Worth) house, when David offers them to. Xin and Graeme prepare to move to London after Tina threatens to report them to the immigration authorities; however, Tina forgives Graeme and tells him that she could never hate him, and watches as the couple leave the street in a cab.

== Sylvia Goodwin ==
Sylvia Goodwin
- Coronation Street character
- Portrayed by: Stephanie Cole
- Duration: 2011–2013
- First appearance: Episode 7575; 11 April 2011
- Last appearance: Episode 8182; 2 August 2013
- Introduced by: Phil Collinson
In-universe information
- Other names: Sylvia Mitchell; Sylvia Cropper
- Occupation: Waitress
- Sisters: Jean Mitchell
- Husband: St John Cropper (backstory); Roger Goodwin (until 2011)
- Sons: Roy Cropper; Richard Lucas
- Granddaughters: Nina Lucas

Sylvia Goodwin (also Cropper and Mitchell), played by Stephanie Cole, made her first on-screen appearance on 11 April 2011. Sylvia is the mother of Roy Cropper (David Neilson) and arrives on the street to visit Roy and his wife Hayley. She is a very outspoken and confrontational woman. Julie Hesmondhalgh, who plays Sylvia's daughter-in-law Hayley, admitted she was looking forward to the character's arrival. Further to earlier reports, Hesmondhalgh described Sylvia as "quite fierce". During an August 2012 interview with Digital Spy's Daniel Kilkelly, series producer Phil Collinson revealed that Cole had taken a break from the soap due to an illness. He added that she would return the following year when she had made a full recovery. For her portrayal of Sylvia, Cole won the "Best Comedy Performance" at The British Soap Awards 2012.

On 2 August 2013, it was confirmed that Cole had left Coronation Street and filmed her character's departure scenes. Sylvia left on 2 August as part of Hayley's pancreatic cancer storyline.

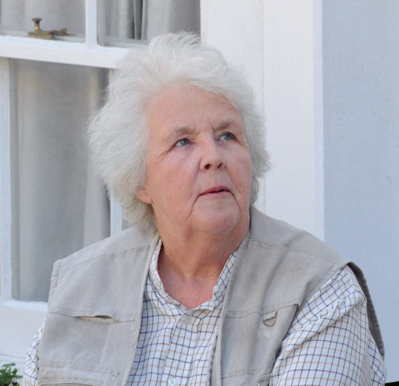
Stephanie Cole portrayed Sylvia Goodwin from 2011 to 2013.

Roy receives a letter from Sylvia informing him that his stepfather has died. Roy tells Hayley that he did not care for the man and is not going to attend the funeral. Sylvia arrives in April on the day of the funeral to ask Roy why he did not attend, even to support his mother. She is shocked to learn that Roy is now married. After Hayley discovers that Sylvia has been living in a run-down nursing home she tells Roy, who eventually offers her to live with them and also offers her a job in the café. Roy is not pleased with the idea of Sylvia looking after the café while he and Hayley go on holiday at first, but he later changes his mind. Sylvia finds Becky McDonald in the café, after she walks out on Steve. Sylvia goes to The Rovers Return public house to get Steve McDonald (Simon Gregson) to remove Becky from the café, but Becky refuses to forgive Steve. Sylvia urges Becky to return home as she is lucky to have a husband like Steve but this also fails. Sylvia is devastated to find out that Roy's wife, Hayley, is a transsexual and she finds it hard to deal with and decides to disown Roy and Hayley, but after Roy tells some home truths to his mother, Sylvia finally comes round, apologising to both Roy and Hayley for her behaviour.

Hayley books a holiday for herself and Roy, but he is uncertain about leaving the café with his mother, who tells him to relax because she has got Anna Windass (Debbie Rush) to help her. While Roy and Hayley are away, Sylvia introduces a new regime into the café by setting prices on condiments like milk, sugar and tomato sauce and even charging to use the café toilet and giving customers smaller portions on their plates. This upsets the likes of Owen Armstrong (Ian Puleston-Davies), Norris Cole (Malcolm Hebden), Karl Munro (John Michie) and Emily Bishop (Eileen Derbyshire). Eventually, Norris decides to ruin Sylvia's money-making ideas by staying in the café after it closes making Sylvia serve him, when Norris needs the toilet, Sylvia decides to lock him in the lavatory, leaving Norris for the night. When Emily goes into The Kabin to inform Rita Sullivan (Barbara Knox) and Mary Taylor (Patti Clare) that Norris has not slept in his bed, they go to look for him, but cannot find him. Sylvia decides to let Norris out before she opens the café, Norris then rushes to the Rovers where he finds Rita, Mary, Emily and Dennis Tanner (Philip Lowrie), and tells them what has happened and they storm around to the café where they tell Roy what has happened, Roy cannot apologise enough and tells them that Mary, Norris, Dennis and Emily are welcome to a free meal after closing time with Sylvia acting as their waitress, much to her annoyance.

Sylvia realises that Anna has fallen for Owen and tells Owen to look after Anna because she has a heart of gold. Becky goes to the café to tell Hayley that Steve and Tracy Barlow (Kate Ford) are having twins, Becky breaks down in Hayley's arms and Sylvia also comforts Becky, with Sylvia telling her that Steve is stupid and has made the wrong decision, Becky then hugs Sylvia and Hayley and telling them how much they mean to her. Sylvia goes on a cruise after winning a competition by stealing Mary's slogan. Upon her return, Sylvia reveals she had a romance with Milton Fanshaw (Robert Vaughn). Sylvia regularly calls Milton, until Roy blocks the number as it was costing him too much. Milton turns up in Weatherfield to see Sylvia. Milton tries to buy the shop next door to Roy's, formerly owned by Ashley Peacock (Steven Arnold) until he was killed in the tram crash in December 2010. Milton plans to knock down the wall and extend Roy's Rolls, Sylvia is happy about the plan but Roy isn't and puts a stop to it, prompting Sylvia to say how disappointed she is in Roy. A couple of weeks, later Milton decides to leave Weatherfield and return to America; he asks Sylvia to move with him, and she agrees. Roy does not show his disappointment, even when it comes to the day Sylvia leaves for America, though Hayley tries to get him to ask her to stay; he refuses, telling Hayley he does not want to rule his mother's life. Sylvia later returns to the café, having decided to stay. When Sylvia hears that Milton has broken his leg, she decides to fly out to Palm Springs to visit him.

Sylvia returns to the street in February 2013 and tells Roy and Hayley that it is just a flying visit, however a trunk arrives at the café and a stunned Sylvia opens it up to find all of her things in it, she then phones Milton, who sent the trunk to the café, and he tells her that although they had fun, he doesn't want her to go back there because someone else is looking after him, so Sylvia returns to working in the café. She then starts acting strangely and starts going out without telling Roy where she is going, Hayley assumes that she has got another man but Roy thinks otherwise, so he follows her and is surprised when she enters a casino, he learns of her gambling problems. Later on he discovers that she has lost £2,000 at the casino, so he tells her he will get it back. Roy, Sylvia, Dennis and Ken Barlow (William Roache) head to the casino and using his mathematical skills, Roy wins back the £2,000; however, back at the café, she and Roy argue about more gambling and Roy walks out. Upon his return Sylvia apologises and Roy gives her back her watch from the pawnbrokers.

In July 2013, when Hayley is first diagnosed with pancreatic cancer, Sylvia supports Hayley and encourages her to tell Roy, who at first is not aware of his wife's illness. Roy and Hayley then decide to go on holiday, travelling the country. While away, Sylvia chooses to leave Weatherfield and go and stay with her sister Jean in Hastings, leaving a note for Anna to find. Upon their return, Roy is furious at his mother's selfishness but Hayley encourages Roy not to be angry, saying that at a time of sadness, some people choose to look the other way rather than help.

After Hayley dies in January 2014 Roy leaves a note saying he is going to visit Sylvia and Jean. However, Fiz Stape (Jennie McAlpine) discovers that Roy did not go to Jean's and that Sylvia, currently holidaying in Tenerife, has had no contact with Roy since leaving Weatherfield. In January 2016, Sylvia falls and breaks both her wrists while dancing. About to visit her children in Australia and unable to take care of her, Jean calls Roy and asks him to look after Sylvia. Roy is initially reluctant, but Cathy encourages him to make peace with his mother; eventually, he agrees and goes down to Hastings to look after her. In January 2019, Roy goes to visit Sylvia in Hastings, only to find she had died before his arrival. Roy later learns that Sylvia had an affair with a man named Raymond Parrott, and had fallen pregnant and subsequently given the child up for adoption. Roy then decides to look for his half-brother Richard Lucas (Paul Bown) and newfound niece, Sylvia's granddaughter Nina Lucas (Mollie Gallagher).

== Stella Price ==
Stella Price (also Munro), played by Michelle Collins, made her debut screen appearance on 16 June 2011. The character and casting was announced on 15 April 2011. Stella was introduced as the new landlady of The Rovers Return Inn public house alongside her partner Karl Munro (John Michie) and daughter Eva Price (Catherine Tyldesley). Of her casting, Collins said "I am honoured to be joining the cast of Coronation Street. The show has been part of my life since I was a child so to become a part of it is extremely exciting." Stella is described as a "confident sort of woman" who is strong, feisty and funny. Upon Collins debut in Coronation Street, viewers criticised her northern accent. However, Coronation Street producer, Phil Collinson defended Collins commenting "I think the landlady of the Rovers Return would have to be a Northern character, really, I don't think we could have had a Southerner running the pub." Cast, including Kym Marsh (who plays Michelle Connor) and Antony Cotton (who plays Sean Tully), also defended Collins.

== Karl Munro ==
Karl Munro first appeared on 17 June 2011 when he moves into The Rovers Return Inn with his girlfriend, Stella (Michelle Collins) and her daughter, Eva (Catherine Tyldesley). In 2012, Karl embarked on an affair with Sunita Alahan (Shobna Gulati) after he struggled with his gambling addiction. Stella, Eva and her other daughter Leanne Battersby (Jane Danson) discovered Karl and Sunita half-naked in The Rovers one night so Stella slapped Sunita. In 2013, Karl began a vendetta against Stella and her new toy-boy Jason Grimshaw (Ryan Thomas), torching Jason's work van and trying to rape Stella. In March, Karl took things to the next level when he set fire to The Rovers, trapping himself, Stella and Sunita. Local firefighter Toni Griffiths (Tara Moran) was killed instantly in the blaze, but Sunita later died in hospital, after Karl pulled her oxygen tube out. Stella then went on to marry Karl, but it was revealed that he torched The Rovers, killed Sunita and has been terrorising young Craig Tinker (Colson Smith). He made his final appearance on 13 September 2013, after being arrested and holding Stella and Dev Alahan (Jimmi Harkishin) hostage.

== Eva Price ==
Eva Price, played by Catherine Tyldesley, made her first on screen appearance on 17 June 2011. The character and casting was announced on 4 May 2011. During an interview with Digital Spy, Tyldesley revealed that there had been a lot of competition for the role of Eva and that she felt "incredibly lucky" to have secured the part. Eva is Stella Price's (Michelle Collins) daughter. She moved into the Rovers Return Inn with her mother and her mother's boyfriend, Karl (John Michie). Tyldesley described her character as being "a little bit of a princess. She's been spoiled rotten, so she's somewhat high maintenance and a little bit of a drama queen. She's definitely used to getting her own way." Kate White of Inside Soap praised the character, saying "Sexy, sassy and often a proper bitch, Eva's by far the most interesting girl in Weatherfield right now. She's got the makings of a classic Corrie woman. Think Karen, think Bet."

== Beth Tinker ==
Beth Sutherland (also Tinker), played by Lisa George, made her first on screen appearance on 5 August 2011. The character and George's casting was announced on 4 August 2011. The actress told a writer for the Grimsby Telegraph that the role of Beth came up while she was touring nursing homes in Glasgow with her musical act. George said "I was delighted they asked me to audition for the role as I saw a lot of friendly faces again, who I have worked with before." George appeared in Coronation Street three times before her latest stint as Beth. Beth initially appears as Steve McDonald's (Simon Gregson) "nightmare date" for two episodes. On 10 October 2011, itv.com announced Beth would be returning to Coronation Street.

== Craig Tinker ==
Craig Tinker
- Coronation Street character
- Portrayed by: Colson Smith
- Duration: 2011–2025
- First appearance: Episode 7661; 5 August 2011
- Last appearance: Episode 11,537; 23 May 2025
- Introduced by: Phil Collinson
- Spin-off appearances: What Would Kirk Do? (2014–2015)
In-universe information
- Occupation: Pupil; Police officer
- Father: Darryl Parkins
- Mother: Beth Tinker
- Stepfather: Kirk Sutherland
- Grandmothers: Nancy Tinker
- Aunts: Arlene Tinker
- First cousins: Sinead Tinker
- Other relatives: Agnes Tinker; Bertie Osbourne

Craig Tinker, played by Colson Smith, made his first screen appearance on 5 August 2011. In August 2017, Smith and Lucy Fallon (Bethany Platt) were longlisted for Best Partnership at the Inside Soap Awards. They progressed to the shortlist, but lost out to Nicole Barber-Lane and Lysette Anthony, who portray Myra McQueen and Marnie Nightingale in Hollyoaks. In January 2025, Smith announced that Craig had been axed from the soap after 14 years. His final scenes aired on 23 May 2025 after Craig is killed in the line of duty.

Craig is Beth Tinker's (Lisa George) teenage son. He accompanies his mother to her date with Steve McDonald (Simon Gregson) at the Bistro, where the trio are thrown out. Craig and Beth later move into 13 Coronation Street with Tracy Barlow (Kate Ford). Craig brings his pet rat Darryl with him, which Tracy dislikes. A few months later, Beth, Craig and Tracy are evicted. Beth and Craig move into the flat above Barlow's Bookies, but when Beth begins dating Kirk Sutherland (Andrew Whyment), they move in with him.

In 2013, Craig begins acting very strangely. He begins avoiding Beth and Kirk and soon reveals to Karl Munro (John Michie) that he had been at the back of The Rovers Return moments before it went up in flames. Craig says he'd thrown a cigarette away when Karl, who was the arsonist, came out, so Karl tries to reassure him that victim Sunita Alahan (Shobna Gulati) burned down the building. However, Craig plans to turn himself in so Karl tricks him into thinking that he had started the fire so nobody would find out his secret. Later, Craig begins to become depressed and Karl starts to take advantage of Craig, such as giving him his phone number and buying him treats. Beth confronts Karl, who says he did it as a one-off. Craig then bunks off school and eventually disappears. Jason Grimshaw (Ryan Thomas), Karl's enemy, and Dev Alahan (Jimmi Harkishin) start to become suspicious about Karl befriending Craig so suddenly. Karl tracks him down and threatens to kill him if he pulls any more stunts. When he is re-united with Beth and Kirk, Craig fabricates a cover story where he claims he is being bullied by schoolmates Dean McGinley (Jordan Rosindale) and Connor Hayton (Bailey Pearson), resulting in them being suspended. The 'bullies' then corner and threaten Craig, but Karl witnesses this and explodes with anger, increasing more suspicion. When Dev tries to talk to Craig, Beth intervenes as she assumes they're in trouble with Dev for shoplifting. After Beth forces Craig into telling her, Kirk, Jason and Dev what's wrong, Craig finally tells Jason, Dev, Beth and Kirk about the incident. The five then work together to bring Karl down, with Dev going to the registry office where Stella Price (Michelle Collins) and Karl plan to marry stop them, while the others go to the police station to make a statement. Despite Dev failing to stop the wedding, Karl is arrested after kidnapping Dev and Stella. Craig avoids Stella when she tries to apologize for everything Karl put him through.

Craig discovers that Faye Windass (Ellie Leach) is being bullied at school and he supports her, as he has been bullied previously for being overweight. Craig looks on-line to discover the reasons for Faye's weight gain and he realizes that she may be pregnant. Faye takes a pregnancy test and it confirms that she is pregnant, which she becomes upset and terrified; however, Craig is willing Faye to support her.

In April 2015, Faye goes into labour and she pleads for her mum to be with her. Craig finds Anna and Owen and he alerts them that Faye is in trouble. Faye is taken to hospital, where she gives birth to a baby girl. Craig is questioned by his mother about the possibility of him being the father of Faye's baby. Craig promises that he is not the father and he was only supporting her through the final months of her pregnancy because he is one of Faye's closest friends. After attempting to attack Craig, following the accusations of him being the father of Faye's baby and hitting Kirk in the process, Owen is reported and arrested for assault. In June 2015 Craig starts acting weird and creeping out of the house at night. Beth starts to suspect that he is a drug addict; however, when she searches his bag, she finds spray paints. Craig shows Beth and Kirk that he has been painting a memorial, for Maddie Heath (Amy James-Kelly), who died in the Victoria Court fire. He later admits to painting on Sally Webster's (Sally Dynevor) wall. Beth and Kirk cheer him on. In August, Craig goes on a camping trip with Beth, Kirk, Sinead, Fiz, Tyrone, wilderness explorer Dougie Ryan, and Dougie's daughter Caitlin, who falls in love with him. They begin dating once Caitlin arrives in Weatherfield but she later decides to end their relationship so that she can study at university.

In 2016, Craig has an attack of cowardice during a failed robbery, in which Kylie Platt (Paula Lane) is stabbed and killed but later redeems himself by showing great courage when Gemma Winter (Dolly-Rose Campbell) is threatened. This inspires him to apply to become a Special Constable but he is turned down on account of his having a criminal father. This is news to Craig, who is angry that Beth never told him. Faye writes to Craig's father, Darryl Parkins (Paul Loughran), who subsequently contacts Craig asking him to visit him in prison. Despite Beth's objections Craig goes to the prison, but is dismayed to find that his father only wanted him to supply him with drugs. He also tells Craig that he is still married to Beth and that her marriage to Kirk is therefore invalid. Still angry with his mother, Craig reports her to the police for bigamy. In 2017 Craig, now a Special Constable (the decision to disqualify him having been overturned), comes under the mentorship of Neil Clifton (Ben Cartwright) who is unbeknownst to him an accomplice of child sex trafficker, Nathan Curtis (Christopher Harper). When Bethany Platt (Lucy Fallon) confides in Craig that Neil raped her, he confronts him and is threatened. Fortunately, Craig contrives to record Neil's threats, and the latter is arrested. Though thankful for the evidence he provided, Craig's superiors give him a formal warning for "breaking the rules".

In 2018, Craig starts flicking switches and turning knobs repeatedly. He goes to the doctor and it is revealed that he has OCD.

On 23 May 2025, Craig was killed off whilst dealing with a domestic incident which led to Craig following the suspect, Mick Michaelis, in his patrol car. The van Mick was driving was stopped by Craig and Mick hit him with a baseball bat. He later died of his head injuries.

== Sam Foster ==
Sam Foster
- Coronation Street character
- Portrayed by: Paul Clayton
- First appearance: Episode 7683; 4 September 2011
- Last appearance: Episode 7700; 26 September 2011
- Introduced by: Phil Collinson
In-universe information
- Wife: Anne Foster (until 2012)
- Sons: Frank Foster

Sam Foster, played by Paul Clayton, made his first on screen appearance on 4 September 2011. The character and casting was announced on 4 August 2011. Clayton previously appeared in Coronation Street as Mal Quillan in 2005. Sam is married to Anne (Gwen Taylor) and is the father of Frank (Andrew Lancel). Of Sam and his wife, a show spokesperson said "Sam and Anne are pretty full -on characters, like Frank. No sooner have they arrived than they're talking grandchildren which instantly freaks Carla out and tensions soon rise."

Sam and his wife arrive in Coronation Street from France to celebrate Frank's engagement to Carla Connor (Alison King). Following a car accident involving Frank and Carla, Sam goes to the hospital with Anne. Sam is disappointed with Frank after he admits to crashing the car, not Carla. Frank later tells his parents the wedding is off, as Carla has ended their relationship. When Carla accuses Frank of raping her, Sam and Anne appear at his court hearing. Sam is forced to hold his wife back, when she shouts abuse at Carla. The following year, Sam has a heart attack and dies.

== Anne Foster ==
Anne Foster, played by Gwen Taylor, made her first on screen appearance on 4 September 2011. The character and casting was announced on 4 August 2011. Taylor revealed she had found her first day on set "terrifying", but she quickly settled in. Anne is married to Sam (Paul Clayton) and is the mother of Frank (Andrew Lancel). Of Sam and his wife, a show spokesperson said "Sam and Anne are pretty full -on characters, like Frank. No sooner have they arrived than they're talking grandchildren which instantly freaks Carla out and tensions soon rise." A reporter for the Western Mail branded Anne a "pompous matriarch".

== Kirsty Soames ==
Kirsty Soames, played by Natalie Gumede, made her first on screen appearance on 7 September 2011. Kirsty was introduced as a love interest for Tyrone Dobbs (Alan Halsall). While interviewed on This Morning series producer Phil Collinson said that Kirsty's arrival marked the start of a "big storyline" for Tyrone. He added that Tyrone's involvement with Kirsty would not be a "smooth ride". On being cast in the soap, Gumede stated "From the moment I read the script, I knew I was going to love playing Kirsty and I can't wait to see how the story unfolds." For her portrayal of Kirsty, Gumede won Best Newcomer at the 2012 British Soap Awards.

== Lesley Kershaw ==
Lesley Kershaw
- Coronation Street character
- Portrayed by: Judy Holt
- Duration: 2011–2012
- First appearance: Episode 7715; 17 October 2011
- Last appearance: Episode 7865; 11 May 2012
- Introduced by: Phil Collinson
In-universe information
- Sisters: Yvonne Perry
- Husband: Paul Kershaw (until 2012)

Lesley Kershaw, played by Judy Holt, made her first screen appearance during the episode broadcast on 17 October 2011. Lesley is married to Paul Kershaw (Tony Hirst). She made her last appearance on 11 May 2012.

Lesley's husband, Paul, starts dating Eileen Grimshaw (Sue Cleaver) and the two women are initially unaware of each other until Marcus Dent (Charlie Condou) tells Eileen that he saw Paul with a woman in the supermarket. Eileen confronts Paul and he explains that Lesley has Alzheimer's disease, and Paul finds it hard to cope. They agree to be friends so when Lesley starts to act violently, Paul confides in Eileen and Lesley goes missing soon afterwards but Eileen finds her. Eileen invites Paul and Lesley for a Christmas drink, but Lesley becomes increasingly confused and continuously asks to go home. In January, Eileen agrees to look after Lesley while Paul works. Lesley talks to Marcus and seems to take a liking to him but when alone with Eileen, Lesley becomes irritated and turns on the television with high volume. She constantly asks where Paul is and then tries to leave Eileen's house. When Eileen stops her, Lesley becomes erratic and starts destroying things. Eileen calls Paul and he comes to collect her and offers to pay for the damage but Eileen refuses. Eileen goes to visit Paul that night and he explains that he has booked a one-night stay at a home for Lesley for his own good. Eileen agrees with him and says he needs a break.

Paul's house is flooded due to faulty water mains so Eileen invites Lesley and Paul to stay with her, angering her son, Jason (Ryan Thomas). Lesley spots Amy Barlow (Elle Mulvaney) blowing bubbles outside and they go to the park. Steve McDonald (Simon Gregson) finds them and brings them home, where Tracy Barlow (Kate Ford) shouts at Lesley for going off with her daughter so Paul puts Lesley in a care home. Lesley later leaves the care home and goes home but Paul collects her and brings her back to Eileen's. Lesley refuses to return to the care home and when Paul tries to force her into his car, she slips and sprains her wrist. She later calls the police claiming Eileen is hurting her, but the policeman leaves when Paul and Eileen explain that Lesley is ill. While she is being looked after by Eileen, Lesley becomes agitated and punches her. Eileen leaves her alone and Lesley tries to make herself cheese on toast. However, she picks up the toaster and drops it in the sink, electrocuting herself. Eileen finds Lesley on the kitchen floor and she is pronounced dead by the paramedics.

== Mike Leydon ==
Mike Leydon
- Coronation Street character
- Portrayed by: Neil Roberts
- Duration: 2011–2012
- First appearance: Episode 7748; 1 December 2011
- Last appearance: Episode 7772; 5 January 2012
- Introduced by: Phil Collinson
In-universe information
- Occupation: Businessman

Mike Leydon, played by Neil Roberts was a client of Frank Foster (Andrew Lancel)'s underwear company Foster's who first appeared on 1 December. He was put in touch with Frank through machinist Sally Webster (Sally Dynevor) and they both agreed to attend a business meeting together. In the new year 2012, Mike attended a party at Frank's house, which was gatecrashed by Carla Connor (Alison King) and began berating him and the other party guests for doing business with him behind her back when he was facing a charge for raping her, which made everyone leave the party. Mike made his last appearance on 5 January 2012.

== Danny Stratton ==
Danny Stratton
- Coronation Street character
- Portrayed by: Jeremy Sheffield
- Duration: 2011–2012
- First appearance: Episode 7759; 16 December 2011
- Last appearance: Episode 7786; 23 January 2012
- Introduced by: Phil Collinson
In-universe information
- Occupation: Hotel manager
- Sisters: Dawn Stratton
- Wife: Vicky (until 2007)
- Sons: Billy Stratton

Danny Stratton, played by Jeremy Sheffield, made his first on screen appearance on 16 December 2011. The character and Sheffield's casting was announced on 14 October 2011. The official Coronation Street website at itv.com said Danny would be introduced as a potential love interest for Becky McDonald (Katherine Kelly), who is trying to forge a new life without her ex-husband. Of Sheffield's casting, producer Phil Collinson said "I'm delighted to be welcoming Jeremy to the cast. Danny will be integral to the unmissable final chapter of the Steve/Becky/Tracy love triangle. It's thrilling that such a key character will be in the hands of such a fine actor." Sheffield began filming his first scenes as Danny on 24 November 2011. The actor admitted to being nervous when he first started filming, but he said having friends in the cast really helped. Danny departed on 23 January 2012.

Danny first encounters Becky when she and her ex-husband, Steve McDonald (Simon Gregson), set up a meeting with him to discuss a potential contract between his hotel and their taxi firm. Danny sets his sights on Becky and arranges a date with her. However, he is left disappointed when she cancels it after a run in with Steve. Sheffield said Danny is very understanding after Becky cancels their date as he knows she is caught up in the situation with Steve. Danny is patient and decides to wait for Becky because he feels strongly for her. Of Danny's attraction to Becky, Sheffield told Katy Moon of Inside Soap "Danny and Becky are from completely different backgrounds – they're like chalk and cheese, yet they find those differences exciting. There's a lot of humour between them too. Danny finds her quirky and quite funny, and he delights in that."

Becky later goes to see Danny, but is shocked when she sees him with another woman and a young boy who calls him 'Dad'. Sheffield revealed his character is a widower whose wife died four years ago. The young boy is his son, Billy (Wade Sayers), and the woman is his sister. Becky goes to leave and Danny catches up with her and explains the situation. Sheffield explained Danny has been through tragedy and although he has met many women since his wife's death, he has not found The One. A lot of the women he has met have had problems with him being a single father, which is why he did not tell Becky about Billy sooner. Sheffield added Danny has a feeling he can introduce Becky to Billy and it will be okay. The actor said "Danny's delighted by her reaction and her instant connection to his son. It only adds to his attraction to her." Danny reveals to Becky that he is being transferred to Barbados and he has decided to go. Sheffield told Sally Brockway of Soaplife that Danny thinks the transfer is a great opportunity, but it is really bad timing. He is torn about whether to stay or go because of Becky. Sheffield said "He's devastated because he saw it as a chance of happiness of the sort that doesn't come along very often." Danny decides to ask Becky to come with him.

== Joseph Brown ==
Joseph Brown
- Coronation Street character
- Portrayed by: Lucca-Owen Warwick (2011–2015); William Flanagan (2017–present)
- Duration: 2011–2015, 2017–present
- First appearance: Episode 7764; 23 December 2011
- Introduced by: Phil Collinson (2011); Kate Oates (2017)
In-universe information
- Father: Chesney Brown
- Mother: Katy Armstrong
- Stepmother: Gemma Winter
- Half-brothers: Aled Winter-Brown; Bryn Winter-Brown
- Half-sisters: Carys Winter-Brown; Llio Winter-Brown
- Grandfathers: Owen Armstrong
- Grandmothers: Cilla Battersby-Brown; Linda Hancock
- Aunts: Izzy Armstrong; Fiz Brown
- First cousins: Hope Dobbs; Jake Windass; Ruby Dobbs (adoptive)

Joseph Brown, played by Lucca-Owen Warwick from December 2011 to March 2015, and William Flanagan since October 2017, made his first on screen appearance on 23 December 2011. Joseph is the son of Chesney Brown (Sam Aston) and Katy Armstrong (Georgia May Foote). Flanagan is the twin brother of Isabella Flanagan, who plays Joseph's on screen cousin Hope Stape. Flanagan's elder sister, Amelia Flanagan, plays April Windsor in Emmerdale.

Shortly after Chesney and Katy begin living together, Katy decides she wants a baby and falls pregnant. Her father, Owen Armstrong (Ian Puleston-Davies), is not pleased and suggests Katy have an abortion. Katy considers the idea when she thinks Chesney has left her, but chooses to keep her baby. In December 2011, Katy goes into labor while acting in the Christmas nativity play. Chesney is out delivering Christmas trees and rushes back to be with her. Anna Windass (Debbie Rush) and Chesney's sister Fiz Stape (Jenny McAlpine) help deliver the baby. Katy and Chesney name their son Joseph Peter but struggles to look after him. Katy leaves him alone when she realizes that she needs to go to the bank, but gets back in time to meet Chesney. In 2012, Katy asks Anna's adoptive daughter Faye Butler (Ellie Leach) to look after Joseph, while she goes out. Faye tries to cook herself some food and when she goes outside to empty the bin, she gets locked out and a fire starts. Owen breaks in and saves Joseph, telling Chesney that he will look after him. Katy doubts her parenting skills, but after talking to her sister Izzy Armstrong (Cherylee Houston), she and Chesney continue to raise Joseph together.

In 2013, Katy has an affair with Ryan Connor (Sol Heras). At first, he stays with Katy but starts visiting Chesney and his new girlfriend Sinead Tinker (Katie McGlynn) more frequently. When Katy ends her relationship with Ryan, she and Joseph move in with Owen and Anna. When Katy's mother, Linda Hancock (Jacqueline Leonard), returns out of the blue in early 2015, she asks Katy to live in Portugal with her. Despite initially refusing to let Joseph go, Chesney tells Katy that they should go for a better life. Joseph leaves with Katy to Portugal in March 2015. Chesney and Sinead visit Joseph in late 2015. In October 2017, Izzy receives a phone call from Owen, revealing that Katy has been killed in a car accident in Portugal, and that Joseph is staying with Linda. Upon hearing of Katy's death, Chesney, who is in hospital recovering after collapsing, discharges himself and travels to Portugal to collect Joseph and bring him back to Weatherfield. Joseph struggles to settle in and reconnect with his father.

Foote was both shocked and excited when she heard her character would be giving birth near to Christmas time. Of filming the labor scenes, Foote told Daniel Kilkelly of Digital Spy "I was really nervous leading up to doing the scenes, and there was quite a long wait to do them. We filmed the storyline out of sequence, so I filmed quite a lot of scenes which take place after the baby arrives before I'd actually filmed the birth. But then the shoot for these scenes finally came up." The actress said it was strange, but she had support from Debbie Rush (who plays Anna Windass) and a midwife. Katy goes into labor while she is playing Mary in a nativity play and Foote said she is quite shocked when she realises the baby is coming. Katy is also scared because she is not giving birth in a hospital, which would be more comfortable for her. While Katy is giving birth, Chesney is trying to get to the community centre in time. In his absence, Anna helps support Katy. When asked if she was pleased with the baby's name, Joseph Peter, Foote said "I'm surprised it's not Jesus! They've obviously gone for the next best thing instead by choosing Joseph. It's a nice name, and then they've chosen Peter as a way of remembering Schmeichel the dog, so that's really nice too." Foote added she had found working with the baby who plays Joseph really good and she had had practice with a baby before when her character looked after Chesney's young niece. Of his casting, Flanagan said he loves working on Coronation Street and acting with his sisters, with whom he learns the scripts with. Flanagan had an audition and a screen test before being offered the part. He stated that the cast and crew "are really fun to work with especially Sam who plays my Dad."

== Others ==
Character	Date(s)	Episode(s)	Actor	Circumstances
Doctor	3 January	7505–7506	Duncan Holmes	A doctor who treated Tracy Barlow (Kate Ford) upon her admission to hospital following an attack.
Darren	7 January	7508–7509	Naithan Ariane	Estate agent hired by Kevin Webster (Michael Le Vell) to value the family's house and all their possessions.
Miguel	7 January	7509	uncredited	Hairdresser at Claudia Colby's (Rula Lenska) salon, Miguel prepares Audrey Roberts (Sue Nicholls) before her haircut.
Nigel	7 January	7509	James Holmes	Camp hairdresser at Claudia Colby's (Rula Lenska) salon, Nigel takes care of customer Marc Selby (Andrew Hall) in the next chair from Audrey Roberts (Sue Nicholls).
Sign Erector	10 January	7510	Jimmy Gallagher	A man hired by Kevin Webster (Michael Le Vell) to erect a "For Sale" sign outside No. 4. Sally Webster (Sally Dynevor) subsequently throws the sign across the street and orders him to leave.
Clifford	10 January – 4 February; 16 May	7511–7528; 7602	Dave Dutton	A neighbour of Joy Fishwick (Doreen Mantle) who calls round for her just before she dies. John Stape (Graeme Hawley) bumps into Clifford a couple of days later, and Clifford voices concern over Joy. He breaks into her house and pronounces her dead. Clifford later attends Joy's funeral. A few months later Clifford catches Chesney Brown (Sam Aston) sneaking around Joy's house, and Chesney questions Clifford, uncovering John's web of lies over the events.
Billy Matheson	14–24 January	7513–7520	Neil Bell	An acquaintance of Chris Gray (Will Thorp), who Chris hires to carry out a couple of burglaries including Janice Battersby's (Vicky Entwistle) flat, as payback for Chris keeping Billy out of prison.
Landlord	17 January	7516	Brendan Charleson	Landlord of the Flying Horse pub, where Ciaran McCarthy (Keith Duffy) is applying for a job as chef. He attempts to break up an argument between Ciaran and Nick Tilsley (Ben Price), who is found buying Peter Barlow (Chris Gascoyne) a drink. Ciaran tells him he no longer wants the job and the landlord orders them to leave.
Kate Quinn	20 January	7517	Lizzie Roper	Luke "Quinny" Quinn's (Stephen Bell) parents. They arrive to hear Gary Windass' (Mikey North) story of how Quinny died. When Gary finishes, he breaks down in tears in his mother Anna's (Debbie Rush) arms.
Ian Quinn	20 January	7517	Christopher Middleton	Luke "Quinny" Quinn's (Stephen Bell) parents. They arrive to hear Gary Windass' (Mikey North) story of how Quinny died. When Gary finishes, he breaks down in tears in his mother Anna's (Debbie Rush) arms.
Gaz	20–21 January	7517–7518	Dominic Coleman	A Rovers customer at the singles night, a drunk Janice Battersby (Vicky Entwistle) tells him how she'd been let down by her daughter on a holiday they'd booked, and she is surprised when Gaz invites her along on holiday with him the next day.
Phil Dickinson	20 January	7517	Stephen Swift	Insurance rep who comes to assess the damage to number eleven. A misunderstanding with Jason Grimshaw (Ryan Thomas) leads to a bloody nose, and Phil leaves without completing the job.
Cashier	21–24 January	7518–7520	Donna Berlin	Cashier who serves Eileen Grimshaw (Sue Cleaver) when she pays in a stolen cheque for £10,000. Eileen later returns to cancel the cheque but is refused.
Police Officer 1	21 January	7519	Rob Hughes	Policeman who carries out a random drugs search on Gary Windass (Mikey North). When he does not comply, he lashes out and is arrested for assault.
Police Officer 2	21 January; 11 April	7519; 7576	Anthony Crank	Originally seen arresting Gary Windass (Mikey North) in January, the policeman appears again in April when he escorts Liz (Beverley Callard) and Steve McDonald (Simon Gregson) to accompany police as Jim McDonald (Charles Lawson) takes hostages in a foiled bank robbery attempt.
Solicitor	24 January	7520	Buckso Dhillon-Woolley	Gary Windass' (Mikey North) solicitor when he is charged for assault.
PC Yates	24–28 January; 9 June	7520–7524; 7620	Simon Hayward	Policeman investigating a spate of burglaries, he suspects Lloyd Mullaney (Craig Charles) is involved. He later turns up at Streetcars with a warrant to search the place for stolen goods. However, the next day, Yates informs Lloyd that they have arrested Billy Matheson (Neil Bell).
Shop assistant	24 January	7520	Marvin Brown	Helped Owen Armstrong (Ian Puleston-Davies) pick out a new computer, but Owen's card was declined.
Sarah	24 January – 21 February	7521–7541	uncredited	Faye Butler's (Ellie Leach) foster mother.
Gemma	27–31 January	7522–7526	Asha Kingsley	Woman who comes to view the Webster house. She is confronted by Sally Webster (Sally Dynevor), who tries to put her off buying. Gemma returns a few days later with her boyfriend, and Sally invites the Windasses round in another attempt to put them off.
Legal Investigator	28–31 January	7523–7526	David Lonsdale	A man who turns up at number five and asks for "Mr. Fishwick", who is actually John Stape (Graeme Hawley). John's wife, Fiz (Jennie McAlpine) answers and pretends she is "Mrs Fishwick". The man informs her of Joy Fishwick's (Doreen Mantle) death, and tells Fiz that her husband "Colin" is the sole beneficiary in Joy's will.
Janine	28 January	7523	Sarah Totty	Nurse assisting Dr Chadderton.
CO	28 January	7524	Rod Culbertson	Army sergeant who dismissed Gary Windass (Mikey North).
Nurse	31 January	7526	Sohm Kapila	Nurse at the hospital when Fiz Stape (Jennie McAlpine) visits her daughter Hope.
Ben Dean	3–4 February; 22 April	7527–7528; 7583	Tony Aitken	Solicitor for Joy Fishwick (Doreen Mantle). Following Joy's death, he meets with Fiz Stape (Jennie McAlpine), who is posing as Joy's daughter-in-law, and invites her to the funeral, which he attends the next day.
Reverend Gilmour	4 February	7528	Oliver Roland	Reverend who conducts Joy Fishwick's (Doreen Mantle) funeral.
Jeff's PA	11 February	7533	Maxine Fone	Personal assistant to Jeff Cullen (Steven Houghton), she manned the desk when Sally Webster (Sally Dynevor) came to confront Jeff.
Croupier	21 February; 29 May	7541; 7612	Rachael McGuinness	A croupier at a local casino, she has served both Steve McDonald (Simon Gregson) and Dev Alahan (Jimmi Harkishin).
DC Tyler	25 February	7543–7544	Paul Kynman	Detective investigating Owen Armstrong (Ian Puleston-Davies) claims of fraud against Eileen Grimshaw (Sue Cleaver). He arrests Eileen, but releases her with a caution when she admits her guilt.
Colette Hankinson	25 February	7544	Martina Laird	Eileen Grimshaw's (Sue Cleaver) brief when she is arrested for fraud. Colette advises her to plead guilty.
Edna Hargreaves	7 March	7550–7551	Elsie Kelly	Mrs Hargreaves is a client at Audrey Roberts' (Sue Nicholls) salon, she has taken a liking for David Platt (Jack P. Shepherd), who she says has magic fingers. David is not too keen on "randy" Edna, and takes an early lunch to avoid her. She is later found dead whilst under the hair dryer by Emily Bishop (Eileen Derbyshire), having died of natural causes.
Doctor	11 March	7554	Julia Sandiford	Doctor treating Sophie Webster (Brooke Vincent) when she is admitted to hospital in March after falling from a church roof.
Receptionist	11 March	7554	Christina Tam	Receptionist in A&E when Sophie Webster (Brooke Vincent) is admitted, she helps the frantic Webster family find Sophie.
Raymond	24 March	7562	Tony Pritchard	Raymond is a businessman who introduces himself to Liz McDonald (Beverley Callard) when she is sitting alone in a hotel bar. When Liz rejects his advances, he insults her.
Mark Bright	25 March – 18 April	7563–7581	Paul Albertson	Kevin Webster's (Michael Le Vell) solicitor in his divorce to Sally (Sally Dynevor). He infuriates Sally when he employs "underhand tactics" by citing her affair with Ian Davenport (Philip Bretherton) as why she shouldn't be given a share of Kevin's recent lottery winnings.
Jane Bridley	25 March – 18 April	7563–7581	Maureen Lunt	Sally Webster's (Sally Dynevor) solicitor in her divorce to Kevin Webster (Michael Le Vell).
Duggie	1 April	7568	Justin Moorhouse	Duggie delivers a car to Sally Webster (Sally Dynevor) as a present from Kevin Webster (Michael Le Vell). He is dumbstruck when Sally refuses to accept the gift.
Bank clerk	4 April	7570	Greg Aled	A clerk who interrupts Fiz Stape (Jennie McAlpine) to tell her of the latest offers at the bank as she is withdrawing money from the deceased Joy Fishwick's (Doreen Mantle) account.
Spoony	11 April	7575	Joe O'Byrne	A convicted murderer and former cellmate of Jim McDonald's (Charles Lawson) who owes him a favour. Spoony gives Jim a shotgun, which he later uses in an armed robbery.
Suzanne Holbrook	11 April – 25 June	7575–7625	Olivia Carruthers	Mrs Holbrook is a solicitor who comes to sort out the details of the sale of The Rovers Return Inn. She is forced to leave when Liz McDonald (Beverley Callard) is called away by the police. Holbrook later returns when Steve (Simon Gregson) secretly reports himself and Becky to social services, acting in the best interests of his daughter he asks for advice. Suzanne appears again a few weeks later as Steve successfully tricks Tracy Barlow (Kate Ford) into signing forms to give him legal access to his daughter Amy (Elle Mulvaney).
Cashier	11 April	7575–7576	Perveen Hussain	Cashier at the bank who is confronted by an armed Jim McDonald (Charles Lawson). She presses the alert button to call the police before collecting the money he asked for from the safe.
Bank customer	11 April	7575–7576	Arran Topham	A young man at the bank who attempts to stop Jim McDonald (Charles Lawson) as he gets away with the money.
Police Officer 2	11 April	7576	Steve Sissons	A police officer at the scene of Jim McDonald's (Charles Lawson) robbery.
Police Negotiator	11 April	7576	Ryan Early	An officer who tries to reason with Jim McDonald (Charles Lawson) on the phone as he holds hostages at the bank, with hesitation he allows Liz McDonald (Beverley Callard) to talk Jim down instead.
Process Server	15 April	7579	Neil Ashton	A man who serves Kevin Webster (Michael Le Vell) with an injunction freezing his recent lottery winnings from being moved or withdrawn until a settlement has been reached.
Judge	18 April	7580–7581	Michael Mueller	Judge overseeing the Websters' court case.
DC Malone	21 April	7584	Olwen May	Police officers who take a statement from Maria Connor (Samia Ghadie) after she reports Frank Foster (Andrew Lancel) for attempting to rape her. They arrest Frank, but later release him due to lack of evidence.
DC Furber	21 April	7584	Kris Mochrie	Police officers who take a statement from Maria Connor (Samia Ghadie) after she reports Frank Foster (Andrew Lancel) for attempting to rape her. They arrest Frank, but later release him due to lack of evidence.
Carer	21 April	7584	Donna Lythgoe	Carer at a run-down retirement home in which Sylvia Goodwin (Stephanie Cole) is staying following the death of her husband.
Jools Creme	24 April	7585	Ben Allen	Jools is the millionaire boyfriend of Todd Grimshaw (Bruno Langley). They come up from London at Easter to visit Todd's family and spend the day with them.
Neighbour	25 April	7586	Sharlene Whyte	A neighbour of Alan (Michael McStay) and Dorothy Hoyle (Jean Fergusson) who encounters John Stape (Graeme Hawley) as he knocks at their door.
Police Officer	25 April	7586	Amy Searles	A female officer who answers Fiz Stape's (Jennie McAlpine) call when she reports John missing. She leaves when Fiz receives a call from Alan Hoyle (Michael McStay) asking her to come and pick him up.
Bob Stephenson	29 April	7589–7590	Paul Leonard	Bob is an immigration official who comes to interview Graeme (Craig Gazey) and Xin Proctor (Elizabeth Tan) about their recent marriage, and ends up having his car smashed into by Mary Taylor's (Patti Clare) campervan. Bob disapproves of that day's royal wedding festivities.
Alex	29 April	7590	Shaun Prendergast	Alex is the teacher of a pottery class which Ken (William Roache) and Deirdre Barlow (Anne Kirkbride) attend. While Ken is put out that his pottery skills aren't as great as he'd hoped and blames Alex for his failure, Deirdre is delighted to have found something at which she is better.
PC Sharon Grant	1 May	7591	Susi Wrenshaw	Policewoman who responded to a call by Steve McDonald (Simon Gregson) and Tracy Barlow (Kate Ford) when their daughter Amy (Elle Mulvaney) went missing on a daytrip in Blackpool.
Mike Leeman	1 May	7591	Graham Walker	Landlord of a one star hotel which Steve McDonald (Simon Gregson), Tracy Barlow (Kate Ford) and Amy Barlow (Elle Mulvaney) were forced to stay at for the night when Steve's taxi was towed in Blackpool.
Transvestite	5 May	7594	Justin Watson-Hermes	A friend of Marc Selby's (Andrew Hall), whose alter-ego Marcia causes problems when he bumps into Audrey Roberts (Sue Nicholls) on a night out after Marc had vowed to quit his cross-dressing.
Drayman	9 May—	7597—	Ian Burfield	A drayman at The Rovers Return Inn who briefly shared a joke with Steve McDonald (Simon Gregson).
Phoebe	9 May	7598	Samantha Riley	Phoebe is chatted up by Tyrone Dobbs (Alan Halsall), but when he stumbles on his words and accidentally insults her, she leaves.
Dr Cole	9 May	7598	Clive Wedderburn	The doctor treating Amy Barlow (Elle Mulvaney) when she admitted to hospital following persistent vomiting.
Practice Nurse	12 May	7599	Deborah Brian	Nurse at the Health Centre, she treats Amy Barlow (Elle Mulvaney) for a suspected milk allergy.
Rachel	12 May	7599	uncredited	A volunteer raising money for the soup kitchen run by James Cunningham (James Roache).
Janet White	16 May	7602	Sanchia McCormack	Janet and Rob are charity workers looking to open a hostel for the homeless in Weatherfield. They offer Sian Powers (Sacha Parkinson) and Sophie Webster (Brooke Vincent) the chance to view how their project in Nottingham works. When a naïve Sophie transfers £20,000 to Rob's bank account to help buy the hostel, the couple vanish and the girls realise they've been conned. It is later reported that the couple have been arrested.
Rob White	16 May – 11 July	7602–7644	Jonty Stephens	Janet and Rob are charity workers looking to open a hostel for the homeless in Weatherfield. They offer Sian Powers (Sacha Parkinson) and Sophie Webster (Brooke Vincent) the chance to view how their project in Nottingham works. When a naïve Sophie transfers £20,000 to Rob's bank account to help buy the hostel, the couple vanish and the girls realise they've been conned. It is later reported that the couple have been arrested.
Consultant	20 May	7606	Naomi Allisstone	A consultant who treats Kevin Webster (Michael Le Vell) upon his admission to hospital following an accident at his garage.
Doctor	20 May	7606	Samantha Best	A doctor at the maternity ward who sees Fiz (Jennie McAlpine) and John Stape (Graeme Hawley) and their daughter Hope for a check up.
Technician	20 May	7606	David Keeling	A technician who arrives to inspect a car lift which had been responsible for crushing Kevin Webster (Michael Le Vell) earlier that day. He informs Kevin's business partner Tyrone Dobbs (Alan Halsall) that the machinery was tampered with.
Drainage Engineer	23 May	7608	Steve Cooper	An engineer who Carla Connor (Alison King) hires to inspect the drainage system at the factory. He informs her that there are serious problems, and that the drains will have to be dug up and laid again.
Cleaner	23 May	7608	Sarah Jane Corrigan	A cleaner who arrives at the Hoyles' home while John Stape (Graeme Hawley) has Alan (Michael McStay) and Dorothy Hoyle (Jean Fergusson) locked up in the basement. He tells her that he is a relation of theirs and that her services are no longer required.
Roberta Kite	30 May – 2 June	7513–7516	Helen Griffin	Social worker Roberta arrives to follow up on a call secretly made by Steve McDonald (Simon Gregson) as to the living arrangements of his nephew Max Turner (Harry McDermott). She speaks to both Steve and his wife Becky (Katherine Kelly) and Max's mother Kylie Platt (Paula Lane)and her husband David (Jack P. Shepherd), and Kylie reveals the truth about how Steve and Becky paid Kylie to leave Max and flee the country. When the lies unravel, it is decided to temporarily take Max into foster care.
Paramedic	31 May	7614	Emma Christie	A female paramedic who is called when Fiz Stape (Jennie McAlpine) discovers her brother Chesney Brown (Sam Aston) and Alan (Michael McStay) and Dorothy Hoyle (Jean Fergusson) locked in the Hoyle's basement by her Fiz's husband John (Graeme Hawley).
PC Allie Fisher	2 June	7616	uncredited	A police officer who arrives at The Rovers Return Inn with social worker Roberta Kite (Helen Griffin) after Becky McDonald (Katherine Kelly) unlawfully goes to see her nephew Max (Harry McDermott) while he is in foster care.
Doctor	3–6 June	7617–7618	Jethro Skinner	A doctor who is seen when Fiz Stape (Jennie McAlpine) is admitted to hospital following a car accident.
Police officer	3 June	7617	Jackie Fielding	A female officer on the case of a missing John Stape (Graeme Hawley).
Woman	3 June	7617	Enid Dunn	A woman John Stape (Graeme Hawley) meets in the hospital lift on the way up to the roof with his daughter Hope Stape. She makes small talk with a stone-faced John.
Fiz's solicitor	6 June – 4 July	7619–7639	Dominic Geraghty	Solicitor for Fiz Stape (Jennie McAlpine) as she is arrested for her part in John Stape's (Graeme Hawley) multiple crimes.
Police officer	6 June	7619	Giles Ford	Policeman who orders work at the factory to cease while investigations into Colin Fishwick's (David Crellin) death continue.
Judge	9 June	7620	Louise Gold	The judge at Fiz Stape's (Jennie McAlpine) bail hearing, which she grants.
CPS solicitor	9 June	7620	Charlotte Palmer	The solicitor for the case against Fiz Stape (Jennie McAlpine), she recommends bail is not granted on the grounds that Fiz is likely to abscond.
Sheila	16 June	7625	Sherry Ormerod	Kooky Sheila arrives for an interview for the job as pub manager, but loses out to the next candidate, Stella Price (Michelle Collins).
Will	16–27 June	7625–7633	Chris Brazier	A friend and ex-colleague of Izzy Armstrong (Cherylee Houston). Will and Izzy meet up a few times, but Izzy's boyfriend Gary Windass (Mikey North) gets jealous and screens her calls before sending Will away when he called round at the flat. Izzy was later furious when she found out.
Receptionist	17 June	7626	Donna Henry	Receptionist at a hotel which Becky McDonald (Katherine Kelly) is staying at. After refusing to give out Becky's room number to Steve (Simon Gregson), she takes a phonecall complaining about the noise in Becky's room.
Noodle	17 June	7627	Chris Brett	A friend of Becky McDonald's (Katherine Kelly), who joined her for a rowdy party held in her hotel room.
Hotel Manager	17 June	7627	Roger Ringrose	A hotel manager where Becky McDonald (Katherine Kelly) is staying. When he received one too many complaints, he ordered Becky and all her friends to leave.
Sandeesh	23 June	7630	Fiona Wade	A client for Carla Connor (Alison King).
Sign writer	23 June	7630	Ian Donnelly	A sign writer who meets Sophie Webster (Brooke Vincent), Sunita Alahan (Shobna Gulati) and Sally Webster (Sally Dynevor), Sophie's mother.
Raider	24 June	7632	James Oates	A masked man who raids the bookies and threatens Leanne Barlow (Jane Danson). Before he can hurt her, Stella Price (Michelle Collins) races in and disarms the man, before he escapes.
Imelda	1 July	7633–7634	Charlene Shaw	A stripper friend of Becky McDonald's (Katherine Kelly), who is hired for Jason Grimshaw's (Ryan Thomas) birthday celebrations in The Rovers Return. When the noise levels cause Ken Barlow (William Roache) to bring the party to a halt, Imelda gives Ken a performance of his own before the pub descends into a riot.
Rocky	1 July	7633–7634	Everal A Walsh	Imelda's boyfriend and manager and friend of Becky McDonald (Katherine Kelly). When a riot breaks out, Rocky is at the centre of the disturbance.
Prison Officer	4–7 July	7639–7640	Craig Whittaker	A prison officer who's less than pleasant when he introduces Fiz Stape (Jennie McAlpine) to her new home.
Ginny Portis	7 July – 5 September	7640–7684	Ashley McGuire	Cellmate of Fiz Stape (Jennie McAlpine), she breaks the news bluntly that the previous occupant had committed suicide days before. In August she had a drug overdose.
Auctioneer	8 July	7641	Charles McCurdy	An auctioneer who is meant to be auctioning a safe house for the homeless, and he informs Sophie Webster (Brooke Vincent) and Sian Powers (Sacha Parkinson) that no such auction is taking place.
Builder	8 July	7641	Rory Gallagher	A builder who Sophie Webster (Brooke Vincent) and Sian Powers (Sacha Parkinson) meet at the site of the soup kitchen, which had recently been vacated without their knowledge. He helps the girls to realise that they've been scammed.
Police Officer	11 July	7643–7644	Clifford Barry	The officer who answers the call of Kevin Webster (Michael Le Vell) when his daughter Sophie (Brooke Vincent) reveals she has inadvertently lost him £20,000.
Jasper	11 July	7644	Ross Grant	A genial barman at an LGBT-friendly bar in which Marc Selby (Andrew Hall) takes Audrey Roberts (Sue Nicholls) on a night out.
Aaron	11 July	7644	Chris Stanton	Aaron is a transvestite friend of Marc Selby (Andrew Hall), and Christine his wife. Marc introduces the couple to Audrey Roberts (Sue Nicholls) in an attempt to help her understand his life as "Marcia".
Christine	11 July	7644	Angela McHale	Aaron is a transvestite friend of Marc Selby (Andrew Hall), and Christine his wife. Marc introduces the couple to Audrey Roberts (Sue Nicholls) in an attempt to help her understand his life as "Marcia".
Simon Shaw	14 July	7645	James Bradshaw	A surveyor who James Cunningham (James Roache) hires in an attempt to remortage the Barlow home from under them.
Anthony	15–18 July	7647–7649	Sam Barriscale	Anthony is the manager of Weatherfield supermarket Frescos. In supervising a photoshoot for an ad campaign, he casts Dylan Wilson (Connor and Liam McCheyne) and Marcus Dent (Charlie Condou) when Marcus' boyfriend Sean Tully (Antony Cotton) cannot get time off work. On the photoshoot, Anthony takes a shine to Marcus and when Sean skips work and turns up, Anthony asks him to leave. Although Sean takes the hint, Anthony's attitude towards Sean causes Marcus to quit the shoot.
Nurse	15 July	7647	Denise Kennedy	
Doctor	15 July	7647	Paul Elsam	
Postman	18 July	7648	Dermot Daly	
Grant	18 July	7648–7649	Seth Lee	
Youth	22 July	7651	Sam Walker	
Lindsay Stanton	25 July	7654	Janine Mellor	
Ruth Walsh	15 August – 5 September		Rebecca Callard	Ruth is Fiz Stape's (Jennie McAlpine) prison inmate. Fiz discovers Ruth is using her baby to smuggle drugs into the prison and later tells the governor. Ruth is moved out of her cell in the mother and baby unit and she attacks Fiz. Ruth continues to harass Fiz, until Fiz warns her to back off and informs her that her boyfriend, Leon Southam (Colin Parry), is back in prison.
Leon Southam	18 August – 2 September		Colin Parry	Leon goes to visit his girlfriend, Ruth Walsh (Rebecca Callard), in prison. He is later kidnapped by Tyrone Dobbs (Alan Halsall), Tommy Duckworth (Chris Fountain) and Kirk Sutherland (Andrew Whyment), who try to blackmail him. They lock him in a former butcher's shop and Leon is later returned to prison.
Jennifer Lingwood	16 September	7693–7695	Lisa Bowerman	Jennifer is Carla Connor's (Alison King) solicitor who advises her on the state of her Underworld business, with Frank Foster (Andrew Lancel).
Stacey	17 October		Candy McCulloh	Rosie Webster's (Helen Flanagan) modelling rival.
Jenny	14 November		Elize du Toit	Jenny is Dr. Matt Carter's (Oliver Mellor) ex-girlfriend. She attends a dinner with Matt and his girlfriend, Tina McIntyre (Michelle Keegan). Jenny and Tina do not get on well. Some unofficial sources listed the character's name as "Jenny Eclaire", but the surname was not confirmed in the episode or in any official source.
Jonno Richardson	8 December 2011	7753	David Sterne	Jonno is Peter Barlow's (Chris Gascoyne) sponsor from Alcoholics Anonymous, who is admitted to hospital after suffering a relapse. When visiting Jonno at Weatherfield General, Peter is shocked to see how far Jonno's health has deteriorated since he fell off the wagon. Later that same day, Howard Lee delivers the news to Peter that Jonno has died after discharging himself and purchasing whisky, before collapsing and being unable to be saved.
