= Windass =

Windass is an English surname. Notable people with the surname include:

- Dean Windass, football player
- Josh Windass, football player, son of Dean

== Fictional ==
- A fictional family from Coronation Street, consisting of:
  - Anna Windass
  - Gary Windass
  - Faye Windass
  - Eddie Windass
  - Len Windass
