= List of At Home with the Braithwaites episodes =

At Home with the Braithwaites is a British television comedy-drama series, created by Sally Wainwright, and produced by Yorkshire Television for ITV. The series stars Amanda Redman, Peter Davison, Sarah Smart, Sarah Churm, Keeley Fawcett and Julie Graham.

During the course of the programme, 26 episodes of At Home with the Braithwaites aired over four series, between 20 January 2000 and 9 April 2003.

== Series overview ==
Series	Episodes	Originally released	
Series	Episodes	First released	Last released
1	6	20 January 2000	24 February 2000
2	8	4 January 2001	22 February 2001
3	6	5 March 2002	9 April 2002
4	6	5 March 2003	9 April 2003

== Episodes ==
=== Series 1 (2000) ===
The first series was broadcast on Thursdays at 9:00 pm.

No. overall	No. in series	Title	Directed by	Written by	Original release date	UK viewers (millions)
1	1	"Episode 1"	Robin Shepperd	Sally Wainwright	20 January 2000	9.45
It's Alison Braithwaite's 40th birthday and she receives a gift that will change her life forever – her youngest daughter, Charlotte, buys her a lottery ticket in which she wins the jackpot of £38 million. Overwhelmed at the prospect of being a multimillionaire, Alison decides to withhold the truth from her family for the time being and attempts to put the money to good use by setting up a charity.
2	2	"Episode 2"	Robin Shepperd	Sally Wainwright	27 January 2000	8.19
Alison continues to keep silent about her lottery win and decides to set up the "Jane Crowther Trust" with the help of friends Marion and Pauline. Virginia moves back home after being 'sent down' from university and admits her love for next-door neighbour Megan Hartnoll. David's affair with secretary Elaine begins to develop over a game of strip Scrabble. Alison's aunt dies and when she is left some money, she feels guilty about accepting it, however, when she hears how her family selfishly argues over it, she is prompted to keep her lottery win a secret indefinitely.
3	3	"Episode 3"	Robin Shepperd	Sally Wainwright	3 February 2000	8.23
The Jane Crowther Trust is making progress and Alison may be closer than ever to telling her family the truth. David makes plans to spend the night with Elaine, however, he begins to worry when his infidelity could soon be exposed. Sarah is a success in her school play, but all is not what it seems when she finds herself in trouble for revealing her true feelings for her teacher in a poem. Virginia is attacked and mugged and later comes out to her mother that she is a lesbian, while Alison confides in Virginia about her own secret, with disastrous consequences.
4	4	"Episode 4"	Andy De Emmony	Sally Wainwright	10 February 2000	8.61
Alison begins to think that she made a mistake in telling her eldest daughter about the money when Virginia starts to spend the money recklessly. She later offers Virginia a job. Sarah goes off the rails and runs off with her neighbour Phil Skidmore. David's affair could soon come to light when more people become aware of his secret. Virginia takes revenge on Megan by telling her husband, Mike, that his wife has been having it off with the handyman in their garden shed. The press is getting closer to exposing Alison's secret.
5	5	"Episode 5"	Andy De Emmony	Sally Wainwright	17 February 2000	8.56
David decides to leave Elaine for good, but will she confess their secret affair to Alison? A journalist breaks into Alison's office and she attempts to bribe him off in order to keep her lottery win quiet. Megan returns to visit a depressed Mike. The journalist soon tails Virginia in a dangerous car chase, which leads him to drive off a quarry and she becomes worried that she has caused his death. Sarah has run away to live with Phil, but all is short lived when she comes home and reveals that she is pregnant.
6	6	"Episode 6"	Andy De Emmony	Sally Wainwright	24 February 2000	9.29
Virginia is relieved when the journalist turns up alive. Tamsin reveals her true feelings for Virginia. Sarah decides to have an abortion, but has second thoughts at the last minute. Both Alison and David's secrets are ultimately exposed; Alison confronts Elaine to discover the truth about the affair, while David finally meets "Jane Crowther". As journalists continue to persecute the Braithwaites, the couple admit their secrets and agree to divorce.

=== Series 2 (2001) ===
The second series was broadcast on Thursdays at 9:00 pm.

No. overall	No. in series	Title	Directed by	Written by	Original release date	UK viewers (millions)
7	1	"Episode 1"	David Innes Edwards	Sally Wainwright	4 January 2001	8.08
8	2	"Episode 2"	David Innes Edwards	Sally Wainwright	11 January 2001	8.30
9	3	"Episode 3"	David Innes Edwards	Sally Wainwright	18 January 2001	8.52
10	4	"Episode 4"	Morag Fullarton	Sally Wainwright	25 January 2001	8.20
11	5	"Episode 5"	Morag Fullarton	Sally Wainwright	1 February 2001	7.84
12	6	"Episode 6"	Morag Fullarton	Sally Wainwright	8 February 2001	8.99
13	7	"Episode 7"	Dan Zeff	Sally Wainwright	15 February 2001	8.85
14	8	"Episode 8"	Dan Zeff	Sally Wainwright	22 February 2001	9.17

=== Series 3 (2002) ===
The third series was broadcast on Tuesdays at 9:00 pm.

No. overall	No. in series	Title	Directed by	Written by	Original release date	UK viewers (millions)
15	1	"Episode 1"	Matthew Evans	Sally Wainwright	5 March 2002	7.34
16	2	"Episode 2"	Matthew Evans	Sally Wainwright	12 March 2002	7.34
17	3	"Episode 3"	Matthew Evans	Sally Wainwright	19 March 2002	6.93
18	4	"Episode 4"	Morag Fullarton	Sally Wainwright	26 March 2002	6.62
19	5	"Episode 5"	Morag Fullarton	Sally Wainwright	2 April 2002	7.69
20	6	"Episode 6"	Morag Fullarton	Sally Wainwright	9 April 2002	7.73

=== Series 4 (2003) ===
The fourth series was broadcast on Wednesdays at 9:00 pm.

No. overall	No. in series	Title	Directed by	Written by	Original release date	UK viewers (millions)
21	1	"Episode 1"	Roger Goldby	Sally Wainwright	5 March 2003	8.29
22	2	"Episode 2"	Roger Goldby	Sally Wainwright	12 March 2003	7.91
23	3	"Episode 3"	Roger Goldby	Jonathan Harvey	19 March 2003	6.39
24	4	"Episode 4"	Jamie Payne	Jonathan Harvey	26 March 2003	7.10
25	5	"Episode 5"	Jamie Payne	Katie Baxendale	2 April 2003	5.57
26	6	"Episode 6"	Jamie Payne	Katie Baxendale	9 April 2003	7.01

== Ratings ==
At Home with the Braithwaites : UK viewers per episode (millions)

Season	Episode number								Average
Season	1	2	3	4	5	6	7	8	Average
1	9.45	8.19	8.23	8.61	8.56	9.29	–		8.72
2	8.08	8.30	8.52	8.20	7.84	8.99	8.85	9.17	8.49
3	7.34	7.34	6.93	6.62	7.69	7.73	–		7.28
4	8.29	7.71	6.93	7.10	5.57	7.01	–		7.10

Audience measurement performed by Broadcasters' Audience Research Board
