= The Full Monty (TV series) =

British-American comedy-drama television miniseries

- Genre: Comedy-drama; Slice of life
- Created by: Simon Beaufoy; Alice Nutter
- Based on: The Full Monty by Simon Beaufoy
- Starring: Robert Carlyle; Mark Addy; Lesley Sharp; Hugo Speer; Paul Barber; Steve Huison; Tom Wilkinson
- Countries of origin: United Kingdom; United States
- Original language: English
- No. of episodes: 8

Production
- Executive producers: Uberto Pasolini; Simon Beaufoy; Alice Nutter; Andrew Chaplin
- Production companies: FXP; Searchlight Television; Redwave Films; Little Island Productions

Original release
- Network: Disney+ (United Kingdom); FX on Hulu (United States)
- Release: 14 June 2023

The Full Monty is a comedy-drama television miniseries. It is a follow-up to the 1997 film of the same name. It premiered on 14 June 2023 on FX on Hulu in the United States and Disney+ in the United Kingdom and internationally.

== Cast ==
=== Main ===
- Robert Carlyle as Gary "Gaz" Schofield
- Mark Addy as David "Dave" Horsfall
- Lesley Sharp as Jean Horsfall
- Hugo Speer as Guy
- Paul Barber as Barrington "Horse" Mitchell
- Steve Huison as Lomper
- Paul Clayton as Dennis
- Tom Wilkinson as Gerald Cooper. This was Wilkinson's final television role before his death in December 2023.

=== Recurring ===
- Miles Jupp as Darren, a friend of the Monty gang and a bureaucrat
- Talitha Wing as Destiny "Des" Schofield, Gaz's teenage daughter, Nathan's half-sister and Ben's aunt
- Sophie Stanton as Hetty Baxter, a music teacher and Jean's best friend who turns on her
- Aiden Cook as Dean "Twiglet" Blakefield, a boy Dave becomes a father figure to
- William Snape as Nathan Schofield, Gaz's son, Destiny's half-brother and Ben's father
- Lewis Whele as Ben Schofield, Nathan's son, Destiny's nephew and Gaz's grandson
- Natalie Davies as Tabani, Des' friend who is very outgoing
- Dominic Sharkey as Cal, Des' friend who is shy and introverted
- Phillip Rhys Chaudhary as Dilip, Jean's deputy who has an affair with her
- Joshua Jo as Sang-Chol, a bird enthusiast that befriends Lomper and Dennis
- Tupele Dorgu as Yaz, Gaz's second ex-wife and Des' mother
- William Fox as Brian, Yaz's despicable new boyfriend
- Halima Ilter as Silvan, a Kurdistani refugee and Darren's love interest
- Emily Bevan as Yvonne, Guy's pregnant, ditzy, fiancée
- Susan Hilton as Margaret Baxter, Hetty's senile mother
- Bruce Jones as Reg
- Lisa Allen as Kath
- Joe Standerline as Funeral Director

== Episodes ==
No.	Title	Directed by	Written by	Original release date
1	"Leveling Up"	Andrew Chaplin	Story by : Simon Beaufoy & Alice Nutter; Teleplay by : Simon Beaufoy	14 June 2023
26 years after going the full monty, the gang are trying to navigate the changing times. Gaz works as an orderly, lives in squalor, and had a second marriage and divorce; Dave works as a school caretaker where his wife Jean is the head and their marriage is in trouble; Horse is desperately trying to claim his benefits; Lomper is married to Dennis and they run a café with a problematic name (Big Baps); Guy runs his own company, and Gerald is retired. Dave discovers that a young boy nicknamed “Twiglet” has been stealing food from the cafeteria at the school and coerces him into helping clean up the place. Gaz's daughter Destiny "Des", is a delinquent who steals a car with her friend Cal, only to find a dog named Chelsea in the backseat. The dog is famous and they turn to their friend Tabani for help, but she instead posts a ransom. Des turns to Gaz to help return the dog, only to learn that the owner's father wants her dead and offers Gaz money to kill her. Gaz struggles with his decision and Des walks in on Gaz about to kill Chelsea.
2	"Supply Chain Economics"	Andrew Chaplin	Story by : Simon Beaufoy & Alice Nutter; Teleplay by : Simon Beaufoy	14 June 2023
Angered over Gaz's failed murder attempt, Des takes Chelsea back to her owner and stays with her mother, despite hating her boyfriend Brian. Dave spends more time with Twiglet and learns that not only is he being bullied, but his mother is slightly eccentric and takes medication. Dave later learns that one of Twiglet's bullies is Des who, upon learning that Twiglet nearly committed suicide, begins feeling guilty. Dave and Gaz's friendship is fractured when Dave asks Gaz to take care of Des and he points out that he and Jean do not have kids, which he quickly regrets. Jean starts to get vilified by the school when she is forced to cut the music class and fires Hetty, her best friend. This also angers Des as she was coerced into joining music class. Twiglet's mother is later called by social services and he is placed into a foster home. Dave blames Jean for the incident as he told her in confidence. It is later revealed that Jean is having an adulterous relationship with the deputy head Dilip.
3	"La Vie en Rose"	Andrew Chaplin	Simon Beaufoy & Alice Nutter	14 June 2023
Horse has difficulty trying to set up a meeting to see if he can receive his benefits while Lomper is dealing with having to pay off loan sharks. Gaz quickly becomes interested in a hospital patient named Ant after figuring out that he was the one behind numerous graffiti art pieces in Sheffield. He tries to get Ant to paint again, but Ant is unable to as his medication tampers with his creativity. Gaz joins a support group of people who taper their medication, posing as someone who is also on medication, and begins taking advice on how to lower the amount of drugs. Meanwhile, Hetty has recruited Des, Twiglet and the other angered students into a private music class and begins a choir that sings inappropriate songs in defiance of Jean. Gaz tries to apologize to Dave, but makes it about himself, angering him further. Ant makes it to a halfway house, but relapses, forcing Gaz to save him. As a result, he is fired from his job at the hospital. He tells Ant that he genuinely saw talent in him. He rejoins the support group where he admits that he has been selfish and childish with his actions.
4	"Homing"	Andrew Chaplin	Story by : Simon Beaufoy & Alice Nutter; Teleplay by : Simon Beaufoy	14 June 2023
Horse takes a very long commute to get his benefits, but the woman interviewing him ignorantly marks him as fit for work, resulting in Horse trying and failing to get a job. Lomper is revealed to have bought a £70,000 female pigeon named Lewis in an effort to feel "adventurous" for his partner Dennis. He tries to have her lay an egg, but it becomes late. He gets a buyer in the form of Korean man Sang-Chol, but must also pay for his stay. Dennis accidentally causes Lomper to lose the pigeon before figuring out that he must pay off Sang-Chol and the loan sharks an exorbitant amount. After hearing the whole story, they gather the Monty gang together to go look for the pigeon, with Dave stopping to impress Jean with new clothes, much to her confusion. Lomper finds the pigeon and discovers that she laid an egg. After an intense stand off, Lomper collects the eggs and reunites with Dennis. Despite crushing one of the eggs, he manages to save one to sell to Sang-Chol.
5	"Re-Homing"	Catherine Morshead	Story by : Simon Beaufoy & Alice Nutter; Teleplay by : Alice Nutter	14 June 2023
Gaz buys his grandson an electric wheelchair, concerning his son, Nathan. He later discovers that Gaz sold all of his belongings to afford it. Dave witnesses Jean and Dilip with each other and becomes suspicious. Sang-Chol takes up residence with Lomper and Dennis and helps run their café. They ask his translator Mun-hee why he is still there and she reveals that he is estranged from his family. While Mun-hee returns home, Lomper and Dennis offer that Sang-Chol stay with them, which he happily accepts. Darren, a bureaucrat friend of the Monty gang, houses Kurdistani refugee Silvan and her son Hasan after they are kicked out of their home. While awkward, Darren becomes a father figure to Hasan and falls in love with Silvan. Despite this, his ex-wife Paula reenters his life where she inadvertently causes Silvan and Hasan to move out. Darren slowly begins to realize that he does not love Paula anymore due to her abrasive and ignorant personality and confesses his love to an angry Silvan.
6	"Welcome to the Job of Your Dreams"	Catherine Morshead	Story by : Simon Beaufoy & Alice Nutter; Teleplay by : Alice Nutter	14 June 2023
Horse, frustrated with his living conditions, heads to the job hub to get help with getting stable living where he inadvertently strikes up a conversation with a cynical man named Miller. After failing to get help for a job, Horse stands on a chair and makes a speech about being mistreated by the system and steals a carpet worker's box cutter, threatening to kill himself. Darren talks him out of it, but Miller uses it as an opportunity to create a rebellion and holds everyone hostage with the box cutter. Guy's pregnant fiancé Yvonne winds up getting caught up when the police arrive. Gaz undermines his police son Nathan and goes inside to the quell the situation, but a SWAT team ineptly makes the situation worse. They have Lomper and Dave arrive with food, but Miller refuses to cease his actions. He suddenly realizes that Gaz, Horse, Lomper, and Dave were strippers 25 years ago and coaxes them to dance for him. With Yvonne panicking, the Monty Gang, plus Darren, perform a striptease and tackle Miller, just as the SWAT team enters.
7	"No Man Left Behind"	Catherine Morshead	Story by : Simon Beaufoy & Alice Nutter; Teleplay by : Alice Nutter	14 June 2023
As Horse recuperates in the hospital, Dave deduces that Jean and Dilip have been seeing each other. Jean aimlessly wanders off in the woods and Hetty takes her mother Margaret with her to go look for her, only for Margaret to disappear, forcing both women to confront each other's animosity. A frustrated Dave recruits Gaz and together coerce Dilip into helping them find the women. Dave and Dilip end up reaching an understanding with one another as they find the women and bring them back. Dave cannot forgive Jean, while Gaz uses his charm to get Margaret to come home with Hetty. Jean drops Dilip off at home and they amicably break up with one another. Des breaks into a prep school with Cal and Tabani where she confesses her love for the latter. They get arrested upon trying to escape and while in a holding cell, Tabani reciprocates her feelings for Des. Horse overhears that there is not enough hospital beds and sneaks out. As he walks through the streets of Sheffield, he collapses and passes away.
8	"It's Not the Waking, It's the Rising"	Catherine Morshead	Story by : Simon Beaufoy & Alice Nutter; Teleplay by : Simon Beaufoy	14 June 2023
The group mourn the loss of Horse. When purchasing a coffin turns out to be too expensive, Gaz steals Horse's body from the morgue, only to learn that Sang-Chol was willing to pay for it. Gaz gets distracted by Des, whom he bails out of jail and then takes to her music school audition, which she believes she has failed. She angrily breaks up with Tabani, whose mother had already forbade her from seeing Des again. Gaz visits an embittered Dave who gives him the idea to perform a Viking funeral for Horse. The group is reluctant, but go along with it when they realize that they failed Horse as his friends and make the necessary preparations. Jean and Dave make amends over the death of their son Michael, while Silvan gets back with Darren when she realizes that Hasan still likes him. The funeral is visited by all of Horse's friends and acquaintances. Yaz reveals that she kicked out Brian and Des decides to move in with Gaz, later learning she has been accepted by the music school. Jean moves back in with Dave as Gaz is the last to leave the funeral.

== Locations ==
The majority of the original film was shot in the Sheffield area, and the TV series production returned to the city. Some scenes were filmed in the city centre, Gleadless Valley, and the Meadowhall Shopping Centre. The production also took in locations in the Greater Manchester area, including Oldham and Bolton.

== Reception ==
The review aggregator website Rotten Tomatoes reports a 67% approval rating with an average rating of 5.70/10, based on 28 critic reviews. The website's critics consensus reads, "The Full Monty threatens to reveal the emperor has no clothes in a silver screen transition that yields mostly diminishing returns, although there's still pleasure to be had in the company of these hardscrabble chums." Metacritic gave the series a weighted average score of 58 out of 100 based on 19 critic reviews, indicating "mixed or average reviews".
