= Judy Holt =

British actress (born 1960)

- Born: Judith Rachel Holt; 15 August 1960 (age 65); Farnworth, Lancashire, England
- Occupation: Television actress
- Years active: 1981–present

Judith Rachel Holt (born 15 August 1960 in Farnworth, Lancashire) is a British television actress, best known for her role as Elaine Fishwick in At Home with the Braithwaites and her role as Lesley Kershaw in Coronation Street. Holt was trained at the Manchester Polytechnic's School of Theatre.

== Filmography ==
=== Film ===
Year	Film	Role	Notes
1984	The Road to 1984	Susan Watson	Television film
2000	Seeing Red	Mrs. Hall	Television film
2015	A.K.A Nadia	Dance School House Mother	

=== Television ===
Year	Film	Role	Notes
1981	My Father's House	Anna Blake	Miniseries; 5 episodes
1982	Love Is Old, Love Is New	Mo	Miniseries; 4 episodes
1983	Brookside	Jenny Kaye	Episode: "The Real World"
1983	Don't Rock the Boat	Yvonne	Episode: "Where There's a Will"
1984	Cockles	Dawn	Episode: "Mermaids"
1986	The Practice	Mandy Bright	Recurring role; 3 episodes
1988	The Contract	Lizzie Forsyth	Miniseries; 3 episodes
1990	Screen Two	Nurse	Episode: "Old Flames"
1990–1994	Children's Ward	Sandra Mitchell	Series regular; 26 episodes
1991	Coronation Street	Mrs. Grice	Guest role; 1 episode
1995	Emmerdale	WPC Wendy Lunn	Recurring role; 11 episodes
1996	And The Beat Goes On	Susan Fairbrother	Episode: "Series 1, Episode 2"
1996	In Suspicious Circumstances	Mrs. Laing	Episode: "The Woman in Grey"
1997	Springhill	Marian	Series regular; 12 episodes
1998	Heartbeat	Hazel Mansfield	Episode: "Baby Love"
1998	Verdict	Rosemary Wyatt	Episode: "Be My Valentine"
1999	The Cops	Dr. Boylan	Episode: "Fallen Angels"
2000	The Bill	Judy Herbert	Episode: "Whispers"
2000	Queer as Folk	Claire Fletcher	Recurring role; 2 episodes
2000–2003	At Home with the Braithwaites	Elaine Fishwick	Series regular; 21 episodes
2002	Always and Everyone	Jean Kenning	Recurring role; 7 episodes
2002	The Bill	Anne Merrick	Recurring role; 6 episodes
2004	Hollyoaks	Ms. Kirk	Recurring role; 5 episodes
2004	Fat Friends	Judy Forbes	Episode: "Bacon, Bagels and the Bishop"
2005	Doctor Who	Sandra Mitchell	Episode: "The Long Game"
2005	Heartbeat	Teresa Hackett	Episode: "Family Ties"
2005	Bodies	Hilary Sachs	Recurring role; 2 episodes
2006	Doctors	Jenny Steel	Episode: "Taped"
2006	New Street Law	Allison Clark	Episode: "Tempest"
2008	Emmerdale	Brenda MacFarlane	Recurring role; 2 episodes
2009–2011	Hollyoaks	Judge	Recurring role; 9 episodes
2011–2012	Coronation Street	Lesley Kershaw	Recurring role; 35 episodes
2013	Moving On	Lucy	Episode: "Hush Little Baby"
2013–2016	Scott & Bailey	Scary Mary Jackson	Recurring role; 9 episodes
2016	Cold Feet	Judge	Episode: "Series 6, Episode 5"
2019	Hollyoaks	Pippa Papadopolous	Recurring role; 2 episodes
2023	Waterloo Road	Celebrant	Episode: "Series 11, Episode 2"
2023	Happy Valley	Jane Hepworth	Recurring role; 3 episodes
2024	Trying	English Neighbour	Episode: "White Lies"
