= Ben Sowden =

English actor

- Born: 23 January 1983 (age 43); Leeds, West Riding of Yorkshire, England
- Occupations: Actor, theatre director, teacher

Ben Sowden (born 1983) is an actor, writer and musician who first appeared as Thomas in Children's Ward (1989 and 1991) and John Reed in Jane Eyre (1997).

In July 2018 he released Left of Arc, a solo album of acoustic folk-punk music and a Christmas single in aid of the Trussell Trust in late 2019. In December 2020 he released No Filter Sky, an Americana-influenced EP recorded during lockdown.

As a writer he is a frequent contributor to satirical publications and in 2020 joined the cast of acclaimed online comedy The Tories voicing British political figures including Jacob Rees-Mogg, Thérèse Coffey and John Redwood. The spoof soap opera was written by long-term friend Henry Morris, who subsequently revealed himself to be the Secret Tory.

In 2023 he played Rumpelstiltskin in pantomime, Lysander in an open-air production of A Midsummer Night's Dream and multiple roles in a dementia-inclusive touring production of A Christmas Carol. In February and March 2024 he took on a total of seven roles in an immersive revival of Noël Coward's Tonight at 8.30, including Toby Cartwright in Ways and Means and Henry Gow in Fumed Oak at the Library Theatre in Leighton Buzzard.

Other Shakespeare roles include Moth in Love's Labour's Lost and Malvolio in Twelfth Night.

In November of 2024 he played the Maniac in Tom Basden's new version of Accidental Death of an Anarchist by Dario Fo, and more recently Justice Wargrave in Agatha Christie's And Then There Were None and Garry Essendine in Present Laughter by Noël Coward.

Directing credits include Kay Mellor's A Passionate Woman, Skellig by David Almond, and [[Wonder Boy]] by [Ross Willis].

In December 2026 he will appear in panto with Unbound Theatre at [[Queen's Park Arts Centre]] in Aylesbury. He is co-artistic director of Running Joke Theatre Company.

He lives with his wife and children in Buckinghamshire and also works in primary SEND education.
