= The Story of Tracy Beaker =

1991 novel by Jacqueline Wilson

- Author: Jacqueline Wilson
- Illustrator: Nick Sharratt
- Language: English
- Genre: Children's novel
- Publisher: Doubleday
- Publication date: 14 February 1991; 1992 (Doubleday re-issue); 2002 & 2009 (Corgi); 14 February 2011 (Corgi re-issue to mark 20 years); October 2018 (re-issue to coincide with the release of My Mum Tracy Beaker)
- Publication place: United Kingdom
- Media type: Print (paperback)
- Pages: 152
- ISBN: 0-385-40075-6
- OCLC: 59149372
- Followed by: The Dare Game

The Story of Tracy Beaker is a British children's book first published in 1991, written by Jacqueline Wilson and illustrated by Nick Sharratt.

== Background ==
The book is told from the point of view of Tracy Beaker, a troubled ten-year-old girl. Tracy is often unhappy and has problems with her behaviour because she is lonely, frustrated and feels unloved. Tracy lives in a children's residential care home (nicknamed "The Dumping Ground") where she has been placed as a result of neglect and domestic violence. Her mother often left Tracy to stay by herself when Tracy was very young and does not appear to have an interest in her daughter's life. Tracy is unhappy because she has not had any contact with her mother for a long time. She seems to miss her mum a lot and it results in her sitting by the same window hoping her mum would come and pick her up. She has difficulty getting along with the staff and the other children at the care home (especially a girl named Justine Littlewood). Another reason Tracy is frustrated and angry is because she was rejected by a couple called Julie and Ted who attempted to foster her after discovering they were expecting a child of their own, knowing Tracy's background with younger children (especially an incident involving Tracy shutting a baby in a cupboard).

From an adult's point of view, Tracy has "behavioural problems" and she is always telling tales. Tracy's imaginative stories seem to provide a high level of comfort and security for her. For example, a recurring story that Tracy likes to tell is that her mother is a glamorous Hollywood movie star, and that she is coming to collect her someday. Tracy says that her mother is so busy being in films that she does not have time for Tracy. Among other things, Tracy's autobiography details her life so far, her being "deprived and abused" in the children's home (for example, she is deprived of Mars Bars and Smarties) and the types of revenge she would like to take upon her enemies. She often portrays a deep and complicated mind.

In 2002 the book was voted the winner of the Blue Peter Book Award for Best Storybook.

== Sequels ==
Wilson has written three sequels to the book, The Dare Game, Starring Tracy Beaker, and Tracy Beaker's Thumping Heart (a Red Nose Day Special).

== Adaptations ==
The Story of Tracy Beaker was adapted for television by the BBC, airing for five series on CBBC from 8 January 2002 to 9 February 2006, featuring Dani Harmer as Tracy Beaker. The first series was filmed in London, but from series two, the series moved to Wales due to a suggestion from the producer, Jane Dauncey. In 2008, a spin-off from series was announced under the working title of Beaker's Back, but the show was named Tracy Beaker Returns instead. It aired on CBBC for three series from 8 January 2010 to 23 March 2012. The former La Sagesse School in Jesmond, Newcastle upon Tyne was used as The Dumping Ground set. In March 2012, Amy Leigh Hickman announced a spin-off from Tracy Beaker Returns called The Dumping Ground. It had been announced following Dani's decision to quit her role as Tracy and has aired on CBBC since 4 January 2013; it has since finished airing its thirteenth series, with a fourteenth to air in 2026. The first series was filmed at the same location as Tracy Beaker Returns, but since Series Two, the series has been filmed in Morpeth, Northumberland. The series have also had spin-off series.

In late 2006, The Story of Tracy Beaker was adapted into a musical, featuring Sarah Churm as Tracy Beaker.

== Translations ==
- Dutch: Het boek van Terry B., lit. 'Terry B's Book'. Translated by Huberte Vriesendorp. Houten: Van Holkema & Warendorf. 1993. ISBN 9026905092.
- Italian: Bambina affittasi, lit. 'Child for Rent'. Translated by Liliana Schwammenthal. Florence: Salani. 1994. ISBN 9788877822932.
- Estonian: Tracy Beakeri lugu. Translated by Lii Tõnismann. Tallinn: Hotger. 2002. ISBN 9985942728.
- Hungarian: Tracy Beaker története. Translated by Kata Damokos. Budapest: Animus. 2002. ISBN 9026905092.
- French: La fabuleuse histoire de Tracy Beaker, lit. 'The Fabulous Story of Tracy Beaker'. Translated by Vanessa Rubio-Barreau. Paris: Gallimard Jeune. 2003. ISBN 9782070552054.
- Indonesian: Kisah Tracy Beaker. Translated by Yoke Octarina. Jakarta: Gramedia Pustaka Utama. 2003. ISBN 9789791060301.
- Norwegian: Tracy Beaker, det er meg, lit. 'Tracy Beaker, It's Me'. Translated by Cille Dahl. Oslo: Cappelen. 2004. ISBN 9788202236939.
- Slovak: Príbeh Tracy Beakerovej. Translated by Katarína Karovičová. Bratislava: Slovart. 2005. ISBN 8080850437.
- Polish: Historia Tracy Beaker. Translated by Katarzyna Petecka-Jurek. Poznań: Media Rodzina. 2008. ISBN 9788677200930.
- Ukrainian: Історія Трейсі Бікер, romanized: Istoriya Treysi Biker. Translated by Volodymyr Chernyshenko. Ternopil: Navchalna kniga - Bohdan. 2010. ISBN 9789661011266.
- Czech: Vadí, nevadí, lit. 'It Doesn't Matter, It Doesn't Matter'. Translated by Daniela Feldová. Prague: BB art. 2008. ISBN 9788073812867.
- Serbian: Прича о Трејси Бикер, romanized: Priča o Trejsi Biker. Translated by Marija Vukosavljević. Belgrade: Odiseja. 2012. ISBN 9788677200930.
- Romanian: Povestea lui Tracy Beaker. Translated by Ecaterina Godeanu. Bucharest: Editura Arthur. 2013. ISBN 9786068044552.
- Georgian: ტრეისი ბიკერი, romanized: t'reisi bik'eri. Translated by Maya Tsitadze. Tbilisi: Sulakauri Gamomtsemloba. 2020. ISBN 9789941306716.

== See also ==
- List of The Story of Tracy Beaker episodes
