= Andrew Hall (actor) =

British actor (1954–2019)

- Andrew Hall
- Born: 19 January 1954; Manchester
- Died: 20 May 2019 (aged 65)
- Occupations: Actor and theatre director
- Years active: 1978–2019
- Television: Butterflies; Casualty; Coronation Street

Andrew Hall (19 January 1954 – 20 May 2019) was an English actor and theatre director. He came to national prominence at the beginning of his career playing the support role of Russell Parkinson in Carla Lane's BBC situation comedy Butterflies (1978–1983).

== Early life ==
The son of James Hall, who worked in Information Technology, and Mabel (nee Jones), Andrew Hall was born in Manchester on 19 January 1954. Hall had two sisters. The family moved around the country, before settling in Guildford, Surrey where he attended the Royal Grammar School. After leaving school at 17, he gained a job at the Yvonne Arnaud Theatre in Guildford where he worked as a stagehand. He joined the Northcott Theatre in Exeter, where he worked as an assistant stage manager on productions directed by Jane Howell, and then rose to be a stage manager at several venues including the Royal Court in London before training as an actor at the London Academy of Music and Dramatic Art (LAMDA).

== Career ==
He appeared in CITV's Children's Ward, playing Charge Nurse Dave Spencer; the BBC's Casualty, playing Frank Wilkinson; in ITV's Coronation Street playing Marc Selby in 2011; and portrayed the evangelist Billy Graham in Harry Shearer's Nixon's the One for Sky Arts. He appeared in the Science fiction series Blood Drive. Hall also played Gordon, a stripper and ex-fiancé of Rona in series 2 (Sept 1992 - Dec 1992) in the BBCs highly successful sitcom ‘2 point 4 children’.

In 2011, Hall directed the London premiere of Sir Alan Ayckbourn's Haunting Julia. He played Bill from spring 2008 to summer 2009 in the London production of Mamma Mia! Whilst appearing in Mamma Mia! he also directed Who's Afraid of Virginia Woolf? at Trafalgar Studio 2 starring Matthew Kelly and Tracey Childs. This production originated at the Lichfield Garrick Theatre, as did his production of Haunting Julia. He also directed a production of John Osborne's The Entertainer at Lichfield.

=== Directorial work ===
- Kindertransport (UK Tour)
- Haunting Julia (Riverside Studios) (pie butler)
- Who's Afraid of Virginia Woolf? (Trafalgar 2)
- Groupie; Romeo and Juliet; Entertaining Shaw; Macbeth; (Vienna's English Theatre)
- Table Manners (Theatre West)
- In Flame,(Yvonne Arnaud and Jermyn Street)
- Silly Cow, The Sea, The Rover, Adam Bede (Guildford for GSA)
- Huis Clos (Belgrade Coventry)
- The Collector (Almeida)
- An Evening with Gary Lineker (UK Tour)
- Empty the Thought Bubble (Jermyn Street)

=== Theatre ===
- Out of Order (UK Tour)
- Blithe Spirit (York Theatre Royal)
- Timon of Athens, (The Brix)
- Antony & Cleopatra, (Leatherhead)
- Romeo & Juliet, Macbeth, A Midsummer Night’s Dream, Richard III, Hamlet, (RSC)
- Camille, (RSC and West End)
- Noises Off! (UK Tour)
- Aladdin, (Bury St Edmunds)
- Cinderella (Lyric Hammersmith)
- Things We Do for Love (UK Tour)
- Absurd Person Singular (UK Tour)
- Gasping (World Tour)
- Wind in the Willows (Sevenoaks)
- An Evening with Gary Lineker (West End)
- Cider with Rosie, Charley’s Aunt, Mother Goose, (Coventry)
- Casualty, Up in Sweden (King’s Head)
- Dark Tales (The Arts Theatre)
- The Roman Road Show, Her Mother Came Too (Leatherhead)
- The Rivals (Chester)
- Les Liaisons Dangereuses (Vienna)
- A Study in Scarlet (Greenwich)
- Freedom to Forget Pravda (Farnham)
- The Fit-Up (Southampton)
- Passion (Chelsea Theatre)
- Dead Funny (Watford)

=== Television ===
Coronation Street, EastEnders, Butterflies, Brookside, Hollyoaks, Children's Ward, Doctors, Dream Team, The Enigma Files, William Tell, Brensham People, Dead Entry, Casualty, Holby City, Birds of a Feather, 2point4 Children, Riders, Come Fly With Me, and Blood Drive.

=== Film roles ===
- The Truth About Love
- Smile
- Moving On
- Girl Afraid

== Death ==
Hall died on 20 May 2019 from cancer at the age of 65. He was survived by his wife Abigail (née Sharp, whom he married in 1977), his mother Mabel, his children Kate and Josh, and his grandchildren.
