= Henry Morris (satirist) =

British satirist and writer

Henry Morris (born 1982) is an English satirist and writer who came to prominence via his Twitter account, which parodies the Conservative party. With close to 200,000 followers, Morris has stated: “The one objective is to destroy the Tories; amplify their ludicrous behaviour and turn it into comedy by making it grotesque.” Launched anonymously in 2019, the account was originally called Mark ne Francois pas, sending up Conservative MP Mark Francois. The name later changed to Michael Govern Ready, a reference to Michael Gove and Boris Johnson’s claim there was an oven-ready Brexit deal, before it became The Secret Tory.

His writing style has covered various formats, including mocked up WhatsApp Group messages between members of the cabinet, reimagining the actions of government figures in the style of Swift and Chaucer, and creating news stories under the guise of the Papua New Guinea Courier's UK correspondent. Claiming on the account to be a “Retired anonymous Conservative MP” and “part-time arms dealer”, the insider tone of the writing and the fact it started to be followed by several Conservative MPs led to speculation it was run by someone who worked in Westminster.

Mark Francois, the original target of the account, added weight to this, saying: "It’s obviously someone who knows me because from time to time they drop in details, like my favourite beer, that only people who know me would know. Just little things. Not necessarily someone who knows me well - someone who knows me a bit, or knew me."

Morris and a team of contributors, including Ben Sowden, also created videos of a spoof soap opera, The Tories, cutting up and re-voicing television footage of prominent Conservatives including Michael Gove, Liz Truss and Jacob Rees-Mogg, Employing caricature and comedic inversion, such as voicing Rees-Mogg as a Glaswegian hard man, the characters were featured taking part in popular television programs, including The Apprentice and Mastermind. These narratives drew on news stories about the government, particularly accusations of cronyism, incompetence and dishonesty.

In 2022, Morris anonymously published his first book, The Diary of a Secret Tory MP: (Almost!) True Stories from the Heart of British Politics, which received praise from LBC host James O'Brien and The Times columnist Caitlin Moran.

In May 2023, his Twitter account began teasing he was going to reveal his identity. Lampooning former health secretary Matt Hancock’s appearance on I'm a Celebrity...Get Me Out of Here!, Morris tweeted: 'I'm going to stand down as an MP and tell you who I am. The Tory brand is starting to get a bit toxic and I'd love to eat kangaroo bollocks on I'm a Celeb one day.' On 31 May 2023, he posted a new episode of The Tories in which he appeared himself, revealing his name.

A subsequent BBC interview uncovered him as a personal trainer and ultramarathon runner living in Wales. Asked on BBC News about the reaction to unmasking himself, Morris said: “The people who were following me since the start have been saying very nice things about me and saying thank you for keeping them entertained during the pandemic. I’m still going to carry on. Unless there’s some weird alchemy about pretending to be a Tory MP that makes you really funny, I reckon I can keep doing it with a straight bat as Henry Morris.” When asked if he’d have launched the account in response to a Labour Party government, he replied he would if they’d behaved as badly, adding, "But you'd have to go some to be as corrupt and incompetent as what we are currently witnessing." This appeared to lead the interviewer to change the subject, then end the interview while Morris was still answering a question.

Now tweeting under his own name, Morris has written and presented a series of wider-ranging satirical videos, tackling net zero, the profiteering of UK water companies and the knowing complicity of fossil fuel producers in global warming. These first appeared on Chris Packham's DIY Youtube wildlife series 8 Out of 10 Bats.

Morris's second book, The Diary of a Secret Royal, was published in September 2023.

== Influence ==
The Swift-inspired story series, Goveller's Travels, which places Michael Gove as the protagonist of the English satirist’s most famous novel, is referenced in the 2023 edition of ’The Cambridge Companion to Gulliver's Travels’ in ‘Part IV - Afterlives’, a chapter written by Université d’Aix-Marseille’s Ruth Menzies.

== Early life ==
Morris grew up in Yorkshire, where his mother was a teacher and his father was an archaeologist. He went to the University of Manchester to study comparative religion and has previously worked as an auxiliary nurse.

== Personal life ==
A member of amateur dramatic society Abbey Shakespeare Players, Morris performs annually at St Dogmaels Abbey, and co-runs Field Maneuvers, ‘a no-frills rave’, which celebrated its 10th anniversary in 2023.

In 2012 he appeared on Mastermind, where his specialist subject was the KLF.

He has completed over forty ultramarathons including Hardmoors, a 113 mile single-stage race. To support Chris Packham's charity Wild Justice, he took part in a run to every site where a hen harrier has been poisoned or otherwise killed to facilitate grouse shooting.

Morris lives in West Wales with his wife and two children.
