= At Home with the Braithwaites =

British TV comedy-drama series (2000–2003)

- DVD cover for Series 3
- Genre: Comedy drama
- Created by: Sally Wainwright
- Written by: Sally Wainwright
- Starring: Sarah Churm; Peter Davison; Keeley Fawcett; Amanda Redman; Sarah Smart
- Country of origin: United Kingdom
- Original language: English
- No. of series: 4
- No. of episodes: 26 (list of episodes)

Production
- Running time: 48–50 minutes
- Production company: Yorkshire Television

Original release
- Network: ITV
- Release: 20 January 2000 – 9 April 2003

At Home with the Braithwaites is a British comedy-drama television series created and written by Sally Wainwright (except for the final four episodes). The storyline follows a suburban family in Leeds, whose life is turned upside down when the mother of the family wins £38 million on the lottery. The show was broadcast on ITV and produced by Yorkshire Television for 26 episodes, from 20 January 2000 to 9 April 2003.

At the beginning of the first series, each member of the Braithwaite family has an issue. Mother Alison has to decide what to do with the winnings, and when to tell her family; father David is having an affair with Elaine Fishwick, his secretary; eldest daughter Virginia is on the verge of dropping out of university; middle daughter Sarah has a crush on her drama teacher; and youngest daughter Charlotte suspects that Alison may be the mystery lottery winner.

== Premise ==
Series	Episodes	Originally released	
Series	Episodes	First released	Last released
1	6	20 January 2000	24 February 2000
2	8	4 January 2001	22 February 2001
3	6	5 March 2002	9 April 2002
4	6	5 March 2003	9 April 2003

=== Series One ===
In the first series of six episodes Alison decides, for the time being, to not tell her family about the lottery win as she worries it may have a negative effect on them. In an attempt to do something good with the money, she starts a charity with the help of her good friend, Marion, and an idealistic out-of-work accountant, Pauline. David begins to regret having started an affair. Virginia falls in love with their new next door neighbour, the selfish and manipulative Megan. A group of journalists attempt to track down and reveal the identity of the mystery lottery winner. Sarah has her advances toward her drama teacher rejected, and she reacts by sleeping with Phil, the boy next door, and becomes pregnant. By the end of the series, the truth comes out regarding Alison's lottery win and David's affair.

=== Series Two ===
In the second series of eight episodes, the Braithwaites have moved into a mansion in the countryside. Alison and David struggle to rebuild their marriage and end up separating. Alison then has a romance with David's brother, Graham, much to David's dismay, until she realises that Graham is still seeing his wife. Sarah gives birth to a son and secretly marries Phil. Charlotte starts getting bullied at school because of her family's newfound wealth. Virginia is going out with Tamsin, a kind and sensible girl, but is still obsessed with Megan. By the end of the series, Alison and David decide to give their marriage another go.

=== Series Three ===
In the third series of six episodes, Alison is awarded a damehood by the Queen for her charity work, and discovers that she is pregnant with Graham's baby. David suggests that they pretend he is the father, until it comes out that Graham actually is. Tamsin is also pregnant, as the result of a one night stand with a guy from university. She and Virginia decide to raise the child together, until Tamsin realises that Virginia is still infatuated with Megan. A newspaper prints a story saying that it was 12-year-old Charlotte who purchased the winning lottery ticket, and the lottery company take the family to court, claiming back all £38 million as it was illegal for an under-16 to enter the lottery. A heavily pregnant Alison cracks and confesses during the trial, forcing the Braithwaites back to their old home and their old lives. Sarah starts seeing a married teacher. By the end of the series, Alison gives birth to a baby girl, Katherine 'Kate/Katie', and the family manage to retrieve their fortune following a legal technicality and a retrial.

=== Series Four ===
In the fourth and final series of six episodes, Alison and David start divorce proceedings. Alison has a romance with her gardener, Nick. David starts seeing Elaine again. Sarah quits college, and starts a business as a wedding planner. She also discovers that Phil, the father of her child, still has feelings for her. Charlotte starts going out with Jordan, Elaine's son, and the pair hatch a plan to get rid of the lottery winnings that Charlotte believes has caused all of the problems within her family. Virginia has finally to choose between Tamsin, who now has a baby girl, Rowena, and Megan. Disapproving of her recent actions, Virginia, Sarah, and Charlotte all struggle to get along with Alison. The final scene of the series sees the whole family, and their friends, arguing with each other, as Charlotte announces that she thinks she might be pregnant.

Sally Wainwright wrote the first two episodes of this series while Jonathan Harvey wrote the next two with the final episodes written by Katie Baxendale.

== Cast ==
- Amanda Redman as Alison Braithwaite
- Peter Davison as David Braithwaite
- Sarah Smart as Virginia Braithwaite
- Sarah Churm as Sarah Braithwaite
- Keeley Fawcett as Charlotte Braithwaite
- Julie Graham as Megan Hartnoll
- Kevin Doyle as Mike Hartnoll
- Lynda Bellingham as Pauline Farnell
- Sylvia Syms as Marion Riley
- Judy Holt as Elaine Fishwick
- Lucy Whelan as Tamsin
- Hazel Douglas as Audrey Crowther
- Damian Zuk as Phil Skidmore
- Ishia Bennison as Denise Skidmore
- Emily Glenister as Emily Braithwaite (Series 1 and 2)
- Garry Cooper as Colin Skidmore (Series 1, 2 and 3)
- Ray Stevenson as Graham Braithwaite (Series 2 and 3)
- Elizabeth Rider as Helen Braithwaite (Series 2 and 3)
- Olive Pendleton as Hilda Braithwaite (Series 2 and 3)
- Adam & Jamie Harrison as Baby William (Series 3)
- Alun Raglan as Daniel Wolfenden (Series 3)
- Amelia Curtis as Beth Wolfenden (Series 3)
- Adam Rayner as Nick Bottomley (Series 4)
- Scott Cooper as Jordan Fishwick (Series 4)
- Rachel Leskovac as Ciara Pickering (Series 4)

== Characters ==
=== Dame Alison Jane Braithwaite DBE ===
Alison is the matriarch of the family. She is upstanding and unselfish. She cares for her family; however, through her deception, she often hurts them. After winning the lottery, she adopts a new Dynasty-resembling look; however, her taste "leaves a lot to be desired" as one character puts it. She has extramarital affairs with her brother-in-law and even her gardener, who is 20 years her junior.

=== David Braithwaite ===
David is the patriarch of the family. He is not as close to his children as Alison, and has a stormy relationship with eldest daughter Virginia; however, she is the only one he ever confides in. He has been having an affair for some time with his PA. He loathes his younger brother, Graham, who has an affair with Alison.

=== Virginia Rowena Braithwaite ===
Virginia is the eldest daughter. She is wanton, feckless and usually entirely selfish. She is closest to her mother, but has the confidences of both her parents. She is openly lesbian and has an ongoing relationship with Tamsin and an on-off affair with Megan. She works as a mechanic occasionally and studies at the University of York. She is described by sister Sarah as being her 'chain-smoking, screwed-up dyke of a sister'.

=== Sarah Elizabeth Braithwaite ===
The middle daughter, Sarah is immature, needy and promiscuous. She becomes pregnant by a neighbour in series one, marries and divorces him in series two, and has an affair with a teacher in her sixth form in series three. She is often the only daughter not to know family secrets, as one parent usually entrusts Virginia with the truth, while Charlotte's investigative nature usually uncovers it.

=== Charlotte Braithwaite ===
Charlotte is the youngest daughter. Still in her teenage years, she is a gawky loner. She is a quiet child and usually finds out secrets through her inquisitive nature. She is occasionally capable of sociopathic behaviour.

=== Megan Hartnoll ===
Megan is originally a neighbour of the Braithwaites and lives with husband Mike. She is spiteful, manipulative and a constant threat to the happiness of the Braithwaites, especially Virginia, with whom she has an affair. She is electrocuted in the fourth series.

=== Mike Hartnoll ===
Mike is the husband of Megan and is strongly attracted to Alison. While Alison feels sorry for him because of his loneliness, the rest of the family find him an annoyance. He is self-pitying, self-righteous, self-indulged and prone to making long drunken diatribes. As David describes him, he is the sort of man whom you invite to a party in the hope he cannot come.

=== Graham Braithwaite ===
Graham is David's brother. After Alison and David split, he lies to Alison telling her he's separated, and the two begin an affair. When she finds out it's adulterous, she leaves him, but he refuses to leave her alone and his behaviour becomes obsessive. Alison falls pregnant with his baby, and she and David try to pass the baby off as theirs. Graham, however, finds out. He is devious, calculating and manipulative, intelligent and articulate, which enables him to deceive others easily.

== Overseas ==
The series was shown on ABC and UK.TV in Australia; TV3 in Ireland; TV One and Prime in New Zealand; NRK in Norway; RTV Slovenija in Slovenia; BBC America in the United States; TVB Pearl in Hong Kong; YLE in Finland; and Yes Plus in Israel.

== Music ==
The theme tune was written and recorded by British band The Egg

== Reception ==
=== Ratings ===
Episode viewing figures from BARB.

Series	Timeslot	Episodes	First aired		Last aired		Rank	Avg. viewers (millions)
Series	Timeslot	Episodes	Date	Viewers (millions)	Date	Viewers (millions)	Rank	Avg. viewers (millions)
1	Thursday 9:00 pm	6	20 January 2000	9.45	24 February 2000	9.29	17	8.72
2	Thursday 9:00 pm	8	4 January 2001	8.08	22 February 2001	9.17	21	8.49
3	Tuesday 9:00 pm	6	5 March 2002	7.34	9 April 2002	7.73	15	7.28
4	Wednesday 9:00 pm	6	5 March 2003	8.29	9 April 2003	7.01	19	7.10

=== Awards and nominations ===
Year	Award	Category	Nominee	Result	Ref!
2000	TV Quick Awards	Best New Drama	At Home with the Braithwaites	Won	
2001	BAFTA TV Awards	Best Actress	Amanda Redman	Nominated	
2001	RTS Awards	Best Drama Series	At Home with the Braithwaites	Nominated	
2002	BAFTA TV Awards	Best Drama Series	Carolyn Reynolds, Jacky Stoller, Sally Wainwright	Nominated	
2002	International Emmy Awards	Best Drama Series	At Home with the Braithwaites (episodes 1 & 6)	Nominated	
2002	RTS Awards	Best Writer	Sally Wainwright	Nominated	
2002	RTS Awards	Best Drama Series	At Home with the Braithwaites	Nominated	
2003	British Comedy Awards	Best TV Comedy Drama	At Home with the Braithwaites	Nominated	
2003	National Television Awards	Most Popular Actress	Amanda Redman	Nominated	
2004	RTS Awards	Best Drama Series	At Home with the Braithwaites	Nominated	

== Home media ==
=== VHS release ===
The complete first series of At Home with the Braithwaites was released on VHS in the UK on 2 February 2001 from 2Entertain.

=== DVD releases ===
The entire series is available on DVD on Region 2 in the UK, both in individual sets and a complete boxset from distribution company, Network. The first two series have been released on Region 1 DVD in the United States and Canada via Acorn DVD. The entire series is also available on Region 4 in Australia and New Zealand through Shock Records. The third and fourth series on Region 4 DVDs are missing segments from episodes, whereas the Region 2 sets are complete and uncut. All four series were re-released individually on Region 4 via Roadshow Entertainment.

Title	Release date			Features
Title	Region 1	Region 2	Region 4	Features
The Complete First Series	24 August 2004	8 April 2003	3 February 2007; 30 January 2013 (re-issue)	6 episodes; 2 discs; 4:3 aspect ratio; English: Dolby Digital 2.0; BBFC rating: 15; ACB rating: M; Special features: cast filmographies & photo gallery (Region 1 only); (No subtitles)
The Complete Second Series	15 February 2005	24 July 2006	5 May 2007; 30 January 2013 (re-issue)	8 episodes; 2 discs (Region 2 & 4); 3 disc (Region 1); 16:9 aspect ratio; English: Dolby Digital 2.0; BBFC rating: 15; ACB rating: M; Special features: cast filmographies & photo gallery (Region 1 only); (No subtitles)
The Complete Third Series	—N/a	31 March 2008	2 July 2007; 4 September 2013 (re-issue)	6 episodes; 2 discs; 16:9 aspect ratio (Region 2); 4:3 aspect ratio (Region 4); 16:9 aspect ratio (Region 4 re-issue); English: Dolby Digital 2.0; BBFC rating: 15; ACB rating: M; (No subtitles); (No special features)
The Complete Fourth Series	—N/a	27 October 2008	1 September 2007; 4 September 2013 (re-issue)	6 episodes; 2 discs; 16:9 aspect ratio (Region 2); 4:3 aspect ratio (Region 4); 16:9 aspect ratio (Region 4 re-issue); English: Dolby Digital 2.0; BBFC rating: 15; ACB rating: M; (No subtitles); (No special features)
The Complete Series	—N/a	27 October 2008; 6 April 2020 (re-issue)	1 December 2007	26 episodes; 8 discs; 4:3 & 16:9 aspect ratio (Region 2); 4:3 aspect ratio (Region 4); English: Dolby Digital 2.0; BBFC rating: 15; ACB rating: M; (No subtitles); (No special features)
