= Children's Ward =

British children's television series (1989–2000)

- Also known as: The Ward
- Genre: Drama
- Written by: Paul Abbott; Kay Mellor
- Directed by: Steve Finn; Alan Bell
- Starring: Rita May; Ian McCulloch; Carol Harvey; Andrew Hall; Janette Beverley; Tim Stanley; Ken Parry; Nina Baden-Semper; Ross King; Michael Bray; Judy Holt; Tina O'Brien; Tom Higgins; Margery Bone; Jenny Luckraft; Tim Vincent; Rebecca Sowden; William Ash; Leyla Nejad; Dean Gatiss; Rachel Egan; Paul Swaine; Chris Bisson; Chloe Newsome; Carl Rice; Kieran O'Brien; Mark Dixon; Sarah Cooper; Gilly Coman; Will Mellor; Stephen Graham; Charlie Griffiths; Ben Sowden; Jamie Harrison
- Country of origin: United Kingdom
- Original language: English
- No. of series: 12
- No. of episodes: 142

Production
- Production locations: Bolton, Greater Manchester, England, UK
- Running time: 30 minutes
- Production company: Granada Television

Original release
- Network: ITV (CITV)
- Release: 15 March 1989 – 4 May 2000

Children's Ward (retitled The Ward from 1995 to 1998) is a British children's television drama series produced by Granada Television and broadcast on the ITV network as part of its Children's ITV strand on weekday afternoons. It aired from 15 March 1989 until 4 May 2000. The programme was set in Ward B1, the children's ward of the fictitious South Park Hospital (known as Sparky's), and told the stories of the young patients and the staff present there.

Aimed at older children and teenagers, Children's Ward was a long-lived series for a children's drama, starting life in 1988 as a contribution to the Dramarama anthology strand "Blackbird Singing in the Dead of Night", then first broadcast as a series in 1989 and running from then until 2000.

== Production history ==
The series was conceived by Granada staff writers Paul Abbott and Kay Mellor, both of whom went on to enjoy successful careers as award-winning writers of adult television drama. At the time, they were both working on the soap opera Coronation Street, and had recently collaborated on a script for Dramarama.

Abbott, who had been through a troubled childhood himself, had initially wanted to set the series in a children's care home rather than a hospital, but this was vetoed by Granada executives. During the course of its run, however, Children's Ward won many plaudits for covering difficult issues such as cancer, alcoholism, drug addiction and child abuse in a sensitive manner. The programme won many awards, including in 1997 a BAFTA Children's Award for Best Drama, won by an episode in which a serial killer lures children to him via the internet and – highly unusually for children's television – is not ultimately caught.

Welsh television producer Russell T Davies was the show's producer, and writer of several episodes, from 1992 to 1995.

The decision to end Children's Ward came in mid-2000, after transmission of the final series, and ironically came as the sole original cast member Rita May – who played Auxiliary Nurse Mags – said she had no plans to leave the show.

On 5 and 6 January 2013, the show was repeated as part of CITV's Old Skool Weekend, which celebrated thirty years of the children's strand. This was also the first time the programme was seen on the CITV Channel.

== Series overview ==
Series	Episodes	Originally released	
Series	Episodes	First released	Last released
1	13	15 March 1989	7 June 1989
2	13	8 January 1990	9 April 1990
3	13	23 October 1990	29 January 1991
4	11	15 October 1991	24 December 1991
5	10	13 October 1992	15 December 1992
6	10	12 October 1993	21 December 1993
7	10	11 October 1994	20 December 1994
8	12	5 September 1995	28 November 1995
9	12	10 September 1996	26 November 1996
10	12	11 November 1997	10 February 1998
11	13	4 February 1999	29 April 1999
12	13	10 February 2000	4 May 2000

== Filming location ==
Filmed at Bolton General Hospital (now the Royal Bolton Hospital), in Bolton, Greater Manchester. Some exterior shots (such as the exterior entrance to the children's hospital) were filmed outside the now demolished Maternity Hospital entrance at the former Withington Hospital, South Manchester.

"30 Years of CITV", which aired on ITV (CITV) on 29 December 2012, revealed that interior sets for the hospital were filmed next door to some of the Coronation Street interiors.

== Characters ==
These are the original main characters from the first three series. Some lasted several years and appeared in subsequent series.

=== Staff ===
Character	Actor/Actress	Occupation	Duration	Character description
Dr. McKeown	Ian McCulloch	Consultant Paediatrician	1989	The lead doctor until his retirement at end of series 1. He is responsible for Fiona Brett's accident.
Dr. Charlotte Woods	Carol Harvey	Originally Houseman to Dr McKeown, later Consultant Paediatrician	1989–1991	Ward B1's new senior doctor, with a tough but fair personality. She marries Steve the social worker at end of season 3.
Dave Spencer	Andrew Hall	Charge Nurse	1989	The senior nurse who runs the ward with a firm grip. He is Charlotte's love interest in series 1 but leaves after a brief romance.
Diane Meadows (later Gallagher)	Janette Beverley	Staff Nurse (1989); Ward Sister (1990–1992, 1996); Senior Staff Nurse (1993–1994)	1989–1994, 1996	Diane is a stalwart nurse in B1; she takes on more senior roles in later seasons, including dealing with matters relating to patients' welfare. Later she marries Dr Gallagher and has a child with him. Diane is known for her warm smile and good bedside manner. She also teaches student nurses while on the ward.
Margaret 'Mags' Davis	Rita May	Auxiliary Nurse	1989–2000	Mags is the longstanding auxiliary nurse on the ward. She is known to be a mother-like figure to many of the patients and to build lasting friendships with the staff. Mags is a very practical person and is always willing to help people out. While not a senior nurse, Mags is an essential part of the team.
Gary Miller	Tim Stanley	Student Nurse	1989–1991	Gary is a new student nurse progressing on the children's ward. He is clumsy and awkward at first but gains confidence and skills in later episodes; however, in series 3, he loses his job owing to an incident with a difficult patient.
Jack Crossley	Ken Parry	Porter and Sweet Trolley Man	1989–1991	Jack was the ward's trolley man, who was known to be a grouch to many people; however, he does have a softer side when patients are ill, and tries to cheer them up.
Jan Stevens	Nina Baden-Semper	Staff Nurse	1989	Jan is a long-standing staff nurse at the hospital, often coming up with the right solutions to problems.
Unnamed Character	Ross King	Hospital Radio DJ	1989	The hospital's first radio DJ who helps kids settle at night and gives light entertainment. His role is phased out after the series 1.
Steve Bailey	Michael Bray	Social Worker	1989–1991	Steve is the local social worker who deals with cases in which there is child abuse and neglect involved. He is a love interest for Charlotte Woods and marries her in series 3. Steve also is crucial to cases in which vulnerable families are involved.
Sister Sandra Mitchell	Judy Holt	Staff Nurse (1991); Senior Staff Nurse (1991–1992); Acting Deputy Clinical Matron (1992–1993); Ward Sister (1993–1994)	1990–1996	Sandra is a senior nurse who has experience in adult nursing. She manages the ward alongside Diane in later series. Sandra is seen as a strict nurse, but we see a softer side as the series progress. She was initially married to a police officer; she later got involved with Swifty's father, but she left him after he jilted her at the altar.
Dr. Kieran Gallagher	Tom Higgins	Senior House Officer, Emergency Medicine	1990–1994	
Katie Grahams	Margery Bone	Student Nurse	1990–1991	
Keely Johnson	Jenny Luckraft	Patient (1989); Play Assistant; Student Nurse; Staff Nurse	1989–1996	

=== Patients ===
Character	Actor/Actress	Duration	Ailment
Billy Ryan	Tim Vincent	1989–1991	Broken Leg, later Alcoholism
Fiona Brett	Rebecca Sowden	1989	Coma and recovery following a Traffic collision
Darren Walsh	William Ash	1989–1991	Asthma
Dawn Khatir	Leyla Nejad	1989–1990	Anemia
Alex Walker-Green	Robert Fenton	1989	Eye injury and Visual impairment following a Shooting accident
Tiffany Kendall	Kate Emma Davies	1989	Appendicitis
Ben Croft	Kim Burton	1989	Obesity
Mathew McCann	Dean Gatiss	1990	Stabbing
Lisa Dixon	Rachel Egan	1990	Psoriasis
J.J.	Chris Bisson	1990	Two broken arms
Thea	Chloe Newsome	1990	Broken fingers
James Boyce	Carl Rice	1990	Diabetes
Lee Jones	Kieran O'Brien	1990	Kidney failure
Cal Spicer	Mark Dixon	1990	Epilepsy
Bryony Shaeffer	Sarah Cooper	1990	
Ben Rowlingson	William Mellor	1990	
Mickey Bell	Stephen Graham	1990	
Claire Dobson	Tina O'Brien	1997	
Geri Stevens	Kelly Greenwood	1997	
Tash	Vicky Binns	1997, 1999	
Ruthie	Emma McGrane	1997	
Shona	Hayley Fairclough	1997	
Ian Cassin	Paul Swaine	1998	
Becky	Holly Scourfield	1999	

Actors to go on to other theatre and television work include Chris Bisson, Tina O'Brien, Samia Ghadie, Adele Silva, Alan Halsall, Stephen Graham, Steven Arnold, Danny Dyer, Jeff Hordley, Nikki Sanderson, Andrew-Lee Potts, Vicky Binns, Ralf Little, Anthony Lewis, Tim Vincent, Kieran O'Brien, Ben Sowden, William Ash, Maxine Peake and Jane Danson.

== Tie-in publications ==
=== Novelisations ===
- White, Helen (1990). Children's Ward. Network Books. ISBN 0-563-36170-0.
- White, Helen (1991). Children's Ward – Deadly Enemies. Network Books. ISBN 0-563-36263-4.
- White, Helen (1991). Children's Ward – Make or Break. Network Books. ISBN 0-563-36264-2.
- White, Helen (1992). Children's Ward – Lost and Found. Network Books. ISBN 0-563-36391-6.
- White, Helen (1993). Children's Ward – On the Run. Network Books. ISBN 0-563-36726-1.
- White, Helen (1994). Children's Ward – The Crash. Puffin Books. ISBN 0-14-037350-0.

=== Script book ===
Children's Ward. Edited by Lawrence Till (contains selected scripts from the series by Paul Abbott, Kay Mellor and John Chambers), published by Heinemann Plays/Oxford in 1992.

== DVD releases ==
Unlike many UK shows, Children's Ward has not been available in other English-speaking countries such as Australia or the U.S.A. prior to the U.K.. In May 2011, a U.K. DVD release was announced for release in July 2011 for the first series from Network DVD. Series 2 followed in October 2011, and Series 3 in January 2012. Series 4 was originally scheduled June 2013, but as yet has not been released.

== Streaming services ==
The first series of Children's Ward is available to stream on ITVX Premium.
