= Sarah Churm =

British actress

Sarah Churm (born 1980 in Scarrington, Nottinghamshire) is a British actress, known for her "big break" playing the part of Sarah in At Home with the Braithwaites from 2000 until 2003. She also appeared in a stage adaptation of the popular book The Story of Tracy Beaker by Jacqueline Wilson called Tracy Beaker Gets Real, and Heartbeat, on television in the United Kingdom. She had a major role as Nurse Zoe Carter in Sweet Medicine.

Churm's other television work include appearances in Holby City, Where the Heart Is, Doctors, Love Soup, and The Upper Hand. In November 2013 she appeared in the one-off 50th anniversary comedy homage The Five(ish) Doctors Reboot. Churm also appeared as Helen in the 2011 film drama Weekend and portrayed Grant's mother in the TV series Utopia.
