= Steve Huison =

British actor

- Born: Steve Huison; 2 December 1962 (age 63); Leeds, West Riding of Yorkshire, England
- Occupation: Actor
- Years active: 1991–present
- Spouse: Terrie “Theresa” (m. 2003)
- Website: www.stevehuison.net

Steve Huison (born 2 December 1962) is a British actor who is mostly seen on television and occasionally in films. He is best known for his roles as “Lomper” in the film The Full Monty (1997), Steve Greengrass in the Victoria Wood situation comedy series Dinnerladies, and as Eddie Windass in long-running soap opera Coronation Street.

== Personal life ==
Huison was born in Leeds, West Riding of Yorkshire. He trained at the Rose Bruford College in Sidcup, London. As of 2016, he was in living in Robin Hood's Bay with his wife, Theresa.

== Career ==
=== Acting ===
In film, Huison is best known for his role as Lomper in The Full Monty (1997). He also appeared in The Navigators (2001) directed by Ken Loach. On television, he has played character roles in numerous television series including Casualty, Where the Heart Is, Dinnerladies, Heartbeat, The Royle Family, Scott & Bailey, and the post-apocalyptic ITV drama aerial, The Last Train (1999, also known as Cruel Earth).

In 2008, Huison took the role of porter Norman Dunstan in the daily ITV1 hospital drama, The Royal Today, a spin-off from the Sunday night drama, The Royal. From 2008 to 2011, Huison played Eddie Windass in Coronation Street. He briefly starred as Mr. Byron in the first season of the CBBC series, 4 O'Clock Club, which began airing in 2012. His role was taken over by Simon Lowe for season 2 in 2013.

In 2023, Huison reprised the role of Lomper in The Full Monty TV series, released on 14 June on Disney Plus.

=== Theatre Company ===
He is also a co-founder of the Shoestring Theatre Company, and founder and host of Cabaret Saltaire, which staged regular performances from March 2011 to June 2026 at the Caroline Club, Saltaire, West Yorkshire.

== Filmography ==
Film
Year	Title	Role	Notes
1996	When Saturday Comes	Jack	
1997	The Full Monty	Lomper	
1998	Among Giants	Derek	
1998	Prometheus	Dad	
1998	L.A. Without a Map	Billy	
2001	The Navigators	Jim	
2001	Tommy Tough	Postie	Short
2002	Domestic	Ray	Short
2003	Chaos and Cadavers	Jim Moore	
2007	Honeymoon	Lorry Driver	Short
2009	Ana Begins	Fraser	
2018	Peterloo	Stable Man	
2018	The Runaways	Tuff	
2019	Leagues Apart	Dave	Short
2019	Assisted	Frank	Short
2021	Shandyland	Brendan	Short
TBA	Glaciers	Adam	Short
TBA	Brigantia	Captain Kynan	Pre-production

Television
Year	Title	Role	Notes
1991	Stay Lucky	Club Act	Episode: "A Roman Empire"
1993	ScreenPlay	Rick Eastleigh	Episode: "The Merrihill Millionaires"
1994–97	Emmerdale	P.C. Raymond Wilson	Recurring (15 episodes)
1994, 2007	Heartbeat	Ken Appleby	Episode: "Assault and Battery"
1994, 2007	Heartbeat	Denis Boon	Episode: "Where There's Smoke"
1995	Cardiac Arrest	Cullen	Episode: "Factor 8"
1995	Out of the Blue	Sgt. Payne	Episode: "Under the Skin"
1997	Woof!	Eddie	Episode: "My Mother the Hero"
1997	Backup	David Stone	Episode: "Not Cricket"
1997	The Drew Carey Show	Himself	Episode: "The Dog and Pony Show"
1997, 2003, 2008–11	Coronation Street	Michael Pearce	1 episode
1997, 2003, 2008–11	Coronation Street	Andy Morgan	3 episodes
1997, 2003, 2008–11	Coronation Street	Eddie Windass	Main (188 episodes & "Romanian Holiday" special)
1998	Where the Heart Is	Adam Ponting	Episode: "Fresh"
1998	City Central	'Batty' Brian Edwards	Recurring (3 episodes)
1998–99	Dinnerladies	Man Worker	Episode: "Royals"
1998–99	Dinnerladies	Steve	Episodes: "Trouble" & "Holidays"
1999	The Last Train	Colin Wallace	Miniseries (6 episodes)
2000, 2006	Casualty	Phil Rees	Episodes: "Choked" (Parts 1 & 2)
2000, 2006	Casualty	Angus Regis	Episode: "The Things We Do for Love"
2001	Peak Practice	Simon Horsefield	Episode: "Hidden Agendas"
2002	Born and Bred	Jack Stubbs	Episode: "The Inspector Calls"
2002	Wire in the Blood	Oliver Hibbert	Episodes: "Justice Painted Blind" (Parts 1 & 2)
2003	The Royal	Mr. Thomas	Episode: "Famous for a Day"
2006	The Street	Michael	Episode: "The Flasher"
2006	The Royle Family	Derek	Episode: "The Queen of Sheba"
2008	The Royal Today	Norman Dunstan	Main (49 episodes)
2012	4 O'Clock Club	Mr. Byron	Main (13 episodes)
2014	Scott & Bailey	Sandy Thewliss	Episodes: "Fatal Error" & "Lost Loyalty"
2014, 2016–17	Doctors	Steve Callan	Episode: "Weirdo"
2014, 2016–17	Doctors	John Glossop	Episode: "Home Help"
2014, 2016–17	Doctors	Jake Fletcher	Episode: "No Room At the Inn"
2023	The Full Monty	Lomper	Miniseries
