= Susi Wrenshaw =

British actress (born 1981)

Susi Wrenshaw is a British actress born in Sandwell in 1981. She trained at Manchester Metropolitan University School of Theatre from 2000 to 2003 and began her acting career in the UK stage première of Jim Cartwright's play Wedded. She played Dawn Riley in The Bill opposite Lisa Maxwell of Loose Women fame. Susi went on to play PC Sharon Grant in Coronation Street in 2011 with Simon Gregson and Kate Ford who play on screen on/off couple Steve and Tracey. Susi first appeared in Emmerdale in 2011 as receptionist Jean Robinson and again in 2013 as a paramedic. Susi is Co-Artistic Director of Salford theatre company Happystorm Theatre, established in 2010, who have produced plays including The Crypt Project, a What's On Stage pick of 2011.
