= Eddie Windass =

Fictional character from Coronation Street

- Coronation Street character
- Portrayed by: Steve Huison
- Duration: 2008–2011
- First appearance: 14 November 2008
- Last appearance: 25 April 2011
- Created by: Kim Crowther
- Spin-off appearances: Coronation Street: Romanian Holiday (2009)
In-universe information
- Occupation: Taxi driver
- Brothers: Len Windass
- Civil partner: Anna Windass
- Sons: Gary Windass
- Grandsons: Jake Windass; Zack Rubinstein

Eddie Windass is a fictional character from the British ITV soap opera Coronation Street. Portrayed by Steve Huison, the character's first appearance on-screen was broadcast on 14 November 2008. On 5 December 2010, it was announced that Eddie was to leave Coronation Street in spring 2011 after being axed by executive producer Phil Collinson. Huison made his final appearance as Eddie on 25 April 2011. This was Huison's second role in the soap; he previously played criminal Andy Morgan in 2003.

== Creation ==
=== Background ===
The character of Eddie was created as part of a new family unit that new producer Kim Crowther introduced to the soap opera, consisting of a mother, a father, a son and an uncle. They were originally billed as a storyline device for established character David Platt. An ITV spokesperson said of the character and his onscreen family: "The Windass family are very rough and ready, always ducking and diving. Early on they get involved with David Platt when he helps to fit a new kitchen in the Windass family home. However, Anna thinks the work is shoddy and refuses to pay for it. David goes round, rips out the kitchen and sets fire to it outside the family’s house." Fellow cast member Debbie Rush spoke about their odd surname and stated they were expecting comments when seen in public about it.

== Development ==
=== Personality and identity ===
Speaking of his character Huison said: "Eddie’s a great character to play, he thinks he’s hard and head of the family, but he’s always one step behind Gary and Len. Eddie is always up to silly scams. He uses crutches but you may notice he doesn’t always limp with the same leg…"

== Storylines ==
The character's storylines start immediately after his first on-screen appearance when David Platt (Jack P. Shepherd) and his boss Joe McIntyre (Reece Dinsdale) confront him and his family about a bounced cheque that they had used to pay for their fitted kitchen. Several weeks later, the Windasses move into Coronation Street after renting No. 6 from Jerry Morton (Michael Starke). After Anna nags him to find a job, Eddie gets a job as a taxi driver at Streetcars, but is reluctant to hand over any paperwork to Steve McDonald (Simon Gregson), due to fiddling Incapacity Benefit.

Eddie plans to start up a darts team, but once he collects the money from the team, he tells them that he's been mugged and lost all the money. Anna Windass (Debbie Rush) is disgusted and accuses him of going back to his old scheming ways., Eddie's plan backfires when Kirk Sutherland (Andrew Whyment) approaches him a few days later, telling him that he has spoken to everyone and they have agreed to keep the team going, since it means so much to Eddie. The Rovers' team consists of Dark Destroyer Eddie, Kirk, Kevin (Michael Le Vell) and Bill Webster (Peter Armitage), Ashley Peacock (Steven Arnold) and Lloyd Mullaney (Craig Charles). Eddie's ruse is uncovered when a visiting darts team arrive at the Rover's to play against his team. The rival team's captain recognises him as Eddie had tried a similar scam two years earlier and the team chase him.

In May 2009, Eddie overhears Roy Cropper (David Neilson) giving Anna the Roy's Rolls password and account number for the Cash and Carry. He deviously takes the details from his wife's handbag and buys alcohol under the pretence that he is working for Roy. He is the Cash and Carry's one-millionth customer and wins a city break to Europe. He tells Anna that he is taking her away for a romantic break and that he has been putting money aside to pay for it. However, Eddie's lie is exposed when Roy's wife Hayley (Julie Hesmondhalgh) sees a cardboard cutout of "Roy Cropper" as the millionth customer at the Cash n' Carry. Eddie is then barred from the cafe by his wife. In July 2009, it is revealed that Eddie and Anna are not in fact married, as he proposes to her. She rejects him and it becomes clear that he has proposed to her many times before in the past.

Eddie and Anna deal with son Gary for most of 2009. He goes to prison after a robbery setup, orchestrated by David Platt, and after his release, becomes interested in joining the army. Eddie is reluctant to show emotion but bakes a cake to show Gary how proud he is. Several months later, Gary goes AWOL after a friend loses limbs in battle. Eventually Eddie calls the military police and tells them Gary is at home, because he feels his son needs to face up to his responsibilities. When Gary is away from home, Anna begins keeping an eye on Chesney Brown (Sam Aston) when he's having family problems. Anna decides she wants to adopt a child, and Eddie warms to the idea. They begin a competition with Steve and Becky McDonald (Katherine Kelly), who also want to adopt.

In early-2011, Eddie and Anna begin fostering nine-year-old Faye Butler (Ellie Leach). Faye proves to be a handful for the Windasses as she doesn't take to her new home right away, her presence leads to tension between the couple and Eddie reveals he never actually wanted to adopt. Eddie pleads with Anna to send Faye back, but Anna refuses to give up on her. When Len (Conor Ryan) offers Eddie a job in Germany, he gives Anna an ultimatum to choose between him or Faye. Anna is appalled that Eddie has placed her in such a position, and tells him that given the choice, she'd choose Faye every time. With this, the couple end their relationship and Eddie packs his bags before saying goodbye to Gary and leaving Weatherfield for Germany.

== Reception ==
Grace Dent of The Guardian slated the character because of his scrounging ways and shoddy appearance stating: "Gary's dad Eddie has no positive attributes to speak of. None. He's six feet tall with a collapsed orange Sideshow Bob hairdo and an ambidextrous limp which switches from left to right leg depending on which Social Security officer is spying on him. He has a permanently fuddled expression which could be down to Temazepam, plain idiocy or the fact all his good brain cells are engaged in working out how to rob your wallet." Tony Stewart of The Mirror also describes Eddie's character as a scrounger. MSN branded Eddie and his family as chavs and being perfect guests for the Jeremy Kyle show, and going on to calling them a million miles away from lower class yobbish families 'The Mortons' and 'The Battersbys'. Whereas Simon Swift of Soaplife magazine commented on the fact that on first looks he couldn't help feeling that Eddie and his clan are a bit too much like original neighbours-from-hell the Battersbys. Kris Green of media website Digital Spy praised and commented on the fact that the Windass clan had 'settled in so well, in such a short space of time', with fellow actor Mikey North stating that their success is down to the good writing and many plotlines the family received in the short time period. In 2010, Dan Martin from The Guardian speculated that a member of the Windass family could be one of the characters to be killed-off in the soap's 50th anniversary special, as he believed that the "primary function of a big soap disaster is to sweep out the dead wood", and that the Windasses was some of the "characters we don't care about even if we noticed they were there".

Upon the broadcast of Eddie's final episodes in April 2011, Jane Simon of The Daily Mirror wrote that she is "gutted" to see the character depart the show and adds that she hopes "the Corrie bosses see sense and decide to glue the Windass family back together before too long".
