= Joe McIntyre (Coronation Street) =

Fictional character in British soap opera

- Coronation Street character
- Portrayed by: Reece Dinsdale
- Duration: 2008–2010
- First appearance: 26 May 2008
- Last appearance: 8 February 2010
- Created by: Kim Crowther
- Introduced by: Peter Whalley
In-universe information
- Occupation: Kitchen fitter
- Wife: Ann McIntyre (backstory); Gail Platt (2010)
- Daughters: Tina McIntyre
- Stepsons: Nick Tilsley; David Platt
- Stepdaughters: Sarah Platt

Joe McIntyre is a fictional character from the British ITV soap opera Coronation Street. The character was portrayed by actor Reece Dinsdale. Joe was introduced as the father of Tina McIntyre (Michelle Keegan), and made his first appearance on-screen during the episode that aired in the UK on 26 May 2008. After Dinsdale quit the show in 2009, the character was killed-off in February 2010. Known for his bad luck, Joe died whilst trying to fake his own death in order to claim insurance money.

== Creation and development ==
Dinsdale was hired for the role following auditions. He is also known for playing Matthew Willows in Home to Roost and has co-starred in other comedy series such as Haggard, the short series Bliss, and more recently Born and Bred, The Chase, and Dalziel and Pascoe. It was revealed on 5 July 2009 that although the producers offered him a pay rise to keep his character with the show, Dinsdale had quit to avoid being a typecast actor.

== Storylines ==
Joe is introduced as the father of Tina McIntyre (Michelle Keegan) in May 2008. He visits on 13 June 2008 where he meets Tina's boyfriend, David Platt (Jack P. Shepherd). In August 2008, he begins a secret romance with Gail (Helen Worth), David's mother. Joe also arranges a date for Tina and David in an attempt to reunite them after they split up, but fails. Once David and Tina have been reunited, he offers David a job fitting kitchens, much to the delight of Tina. Tina and David are not pleased when they learn that their parents are dating, when they walk into No.8 and catch Gail and Joe kissing.

Shortly afterwards, David steals money from the Windass family, who refused to pay for a kitchen Joe had fitted. In revenge, Gary Windass (Mikey North) and his uncle Len (Conor Ryan) steal Joe's tools so Tina, David and Graeme Proctor (Craig Gazey) rip out the Windass' kitchen and set it on fire but their plan backfires as Gary and Len tear out Gail's kitchen. Joe goes to great expense to build her a new one and also buys Gail a golden watch, despite being in a lot of debt from the failure of his business. Despite Joe's efforts, his plan for a perfect Christmas is ruined when Gail invites the Windass' over for Christmas Day. He grows increasingly frustrated with their presence and is perplexed when they give him a tool belt as a Christmas present, which reminds Joe of the tools that they stole from him. When Gary repeatedly makes moves on Tina and Gary and David get into a brawl, Joe's fury finally explodes. He begins screaming at the Windass', telling them they are pathetic, and throws food at them. They leave the house humiliated and Joe walks out. The next day, Gail and Joe make up, but Gail is shaken, as he has reminded her of some of the men from her past.

Joe is having problems paying his debts due to lack of work but hides this from Gail. In January 2009, he gets a job with local builder Bill Webster (Peter Armitage) but asks him to say that he is fitting kitchens for him. He moves in with Gail, still keeping quiet about his debts and recent eviction from his flat. Gary begins to persistently pester and flirt with Tina, resulting in Joe warning him off, after he pushes his luck and asks Tina out on a date. After Joe warns Gary off a second time, Gary calls Len to help him break into the builder's yard and steal copper piping. The following day, Bill and Jason Grimshaw (Ryan Thomas) suspect Joe is responsible and Gary mocks Joe because of this, resulting in Joe lashing out, but Bill and Jason hold him back. David, who has witnessed Gary and Len driving away from the builder's yard, reports them to the police.

Gary continues to flirt with Tina whilst mocking David which results in David punching Gary, leading to a fight between them. David is left with a broken nose and concussion and is rushed to hospital, while Gary is arrested. David convinces Tina, who saw the fight, to tell the police that Gary threw the first punch. Len then locks himself and Tina in the kebab shop and threatens Tina to change her statement so Gary would not be sent to prison but Joe warns Len not to intimidate Tina, stating that she is all he has left.

On the run up to Gary's trial, Joe receives a phone call from someone needing nineteen new kitchens for a building development. Overjoyed at the news, he goes to the site where he is dismayed to find that Len is responsible. He tells Joe that he will give him the job on the condition that he persuade Tina to retract her statement. Joe is stunned when Tina admits that she was lying about the incident but he vows to support her nonetheless. Later, under the mounting pressure of debts, Joe secretly agrees to the deal with Len. Gary is cleared of all charges and Joe is overcome with guilt at having manipulated Tina for money. Joe takes out a loan to pay for the supplies for the job and whilst shaking hands with Len over the contract agreement, David walks in and angrily asks what's going on. Joe squirms with embarrassment when Len smugly tells David about his and Joe's deal. Tina is furious when she finds out and tells Gail that Joe has only moved in with her as he has been evicted from his flat. She also reveals that he has suffered severe depression in the past. Joe is horrified to learn that Gail paid for Tina to have an abortion a year ago. Gail ends the relationship and throws him out, warning him never to return. When Joe comes to collect his belongings from Gail's, she tells him that he can stay in her daughter Sarah Grimshaw's (Tina O'Brien) old room. When David learns this, he is furious and throws Joe's things down the stairs. After Gail chooses Joe over David, he moves out and stays with his father Martin (Sean Wilson).

Just before Joe's lucrative new job starts, he and Tina decide to rent a flat together. Whilst Joe is moving, his things are moved out of Gail's. However, he slips a disk in his back meaning that he cannot work or move out of Gail's. Gail is secretly delighted about this and the couple reconcile. However, Joe continues to push himself too far trying to go back to work before he is ready and because of this, he collapses. On Len's suggestion, he is forced to ask Gary to help out with the job until his back recovers.

Following his back injury, it becomes increasingly clear that Joe is becoming dependent on prescription drugs, even going as far as to vandalise the kitchen when he cannot find the medication. In July 2009, Graeme spots Joe's painkillers and Joe is interested to hear how there was a black market for them when Graeme was in the young offenders' institute. Later, when his concerned doctor refuses to give him another prescription, a desperate Joe asks Graeme if he could obtain some painkillers for him until his back is better. Graeme agrees to speak to his contact, and gets Joe the painkillers, as promised, but tells him it is a one-off favour.

David returns and finds out about Joe's addiction and deviously hides his pills. Joe panics only for David to later "discover" them in the pocket of Gail's dressing gown. David helps Joe as a supposed apology for his behaviour but whilst they're burning some unneeded supplies, David finds Graeme's supply of pills in the van and, after secretly emptying the pills and putting them in his pocket, throws the packet in the fire. When Joe cries out in alarm, David claims that he thought Joe no longer needed them since he had told Gail earlier that his back was cured. Joe has no choice but to apologise for his outburst. When they return home, David repeatedly irritates Joe by talking about the pills and when Joe shouts at him, Gail angrily asks for an explanation, further frustrating Joe. David persuades Graeme to stop Joe's supply. David then tells Joe he will supply him drugs in exchange for a "favour". Much later, David reveals this to be a deviously underhand attempt to force Joe to split up Jason and Tina.

Joe steals from Gail so he can pay David to get him more painkillers. He steals £30 from her purse, but later makes it up with her. Following David's orders, Joe attempts to convince Tina that David is better boyfriend material than Jason, much to Tina's confusion and eventual anger when Joe persists. Tina and Jason confront Joe in front of Gail about why he's trying to split them up and Joe is left red-faced when he can't provide an explanation, resulting in Tina telling him to back off. Hurt at Tina's words, Joe angrily threatens David for his blackmail but this backfires when David cuts off his pill supply. His misery is compounded when he gets removed from the building job due to turning up late again. Thinking he has no other option, Joe steals keys from Gail's bag to get into the medical centre in order to obtain painkillers but sets the alarm off and is arrested on suspicion of burglary. Joe is eventually cured of his addiction and after, receiving help from Gail and Tina, he returns to helping Tina and Jason with their new flat.

Over the next few months, Joe slowly begins to get his life back on track. His relationship with Gail and her family becomes stronger and after securing a job at a hardware store, he buys a boat. He even starts getting on better with David after they bond during a fishing trip and one evening in November, Joe surprises Gail with a meal and champagne on the back of the boat. He proposes to her, which she delightfully accepts as fireworks set off. David learns about the engagement and although him and Gail's mother, Audrey Roberts (Sue Nicholls), aren't happy at first, they eventually decide to let Joe and Gail be happy.

The next morning, Joe dances around the house, happier than ever. After taking Gail to work, Joe arrives home and is greeted by a man called Rick Neelan (Greg Wood). Rick reveals that he's a loan shark and informs a stunned Joe that he's £9,000 in debt. He explains that he bought the loan that Joe took out in March for the bathroom job and that it has risen from interest. Joe has to give up his van to pay up £5,000 on the debt. Joe is further dismayed when the hardware store shuts down, meaning he's out of work. Panicking, he is forced to confess to Gail about his problem, though he lies that he owes money to a bank instead of a loan shark. Gail suggests they sell the house, pay his debts and use the rest of the money for a flat and the wedding. David doesn't like this and tells Audrey about it, who is angry at Gail. When Audrey can't get through to her, she later contacts her other son Nick Tilsley (Ben Price) to talk some sense into Gail. However, when Nick meets Joe, the two of them get along and Nick tells Gail he is pleased for them both. Just before Christmas, Gail discovers that an offer has been made on the house, leaving Joe delighted. He is alarmed, however, when Nick tries to dissuade Gail since the offer is lower than expected but eventually Gail decides to accept it.

After New Year, Gail receives a call telling her that the sale has fallen through. Gail is disappointed whilst Joe quietly reacts with horror. Needing urgent cash, Joe asks Peter Barlow (Chris Gascoyne) if he can help with the plumbing of his new bar which Peter agrees to in principle, reminding Joe that the bar isn't likely to open for months. He is shocked when Joe asks for an advance for materials and sends Joe packing. Reluctantly, Joe asks to borrow £4,000 from Gail's father Ted Page (Michael Byrne), lying that it's a deposit for a flat. He then uses it to pay back Rick and they both agree that they end their acquaintances.

On 8 January 2010, Joe marries Gail, with Joe thrilled that his problems are finally over. She is given away by Ted, and the best man is Nick. At the reception in the Rovers, Joe is horrified when Rick turns up again. Rick tells Joe that he would now have to pay interest, £500 for the next ten weeks, costing at least £5,000. He also threatens Joe again and Joe becomes scared of what will happen to his daughter. Before Joe and Gail leave to go on their honeymoon, Joe tells Jason to look after Tina and watch her. Upon their return, Joe is anxious for a sale of the house so that he can pay back Rick and when David sabotages viewings as he can't afford somewhere else to live; he contacts a company about a quick-sale. Joe acknowledges that this means selling for less than half the asking price and attempts to do so behind Gail's back. During this time, Joe sinks to new lows when he is caught stealing from a cancer charity box by Bill who is appalled, though Joe tries to deny his actions. Gail unexpectedly arrives home whilst Joe is showing the quick-sale company around and angrily asks them to leave. She then confronts Joe and reveals that she has decided to take the house off the market and find another way to solve the debt, as she feels sorry for David. Joe is apoplectic with rage and shouts at Gail which leads out into the street with Joe insulting Gail with the claim that all her men end up doomed, resulting in Gail slapping him. Joe eventually begs for forgiveness and confesses that the person he owes money to is a loan shark, and that he has threatened his family. He tells Gail that he's petrified of what Rick might do and she comforts him.

Joe decides that the only way to escape his problems is to fake his own death by disappearing in the Lake District. After saying goodbye to Tina, him and Gail set off. When they arrive, Joe explains his plans to a horrified Gail. Gail tries to stop him by getting into the boat with him, knowing that he won't set sail with her in it. The two of them struggle and Joe injures his wrist after Gail pushes him but eventually, he is able to remove her from the boat and sets sail whilst Gail screams at him to come back. Back in Weatherfield, Tina and Jason discover Joe's debts after Rick threatens them. Jason is furious that Joe has fled to save his own skin and left his daughter in danger, whilst Tina is worried about her father. Joe comes into difficulties whilst trying to get in the attached lifeboat when it nearly floats away. After much effort he is able to get the lifeboat back, but just as he's about to get in, the wind blows and the sail knocks him into the water. In his final moments, he desperately tries to swim back to the boat but struggles with his injured wrist. Eventually, he makes it but cannot survive the freezing cold water, his hands slip off the side of the boat and he drowns. Joe stated earlier in the episode that he planned to emulate "that canoe bloke who faked his own death". This is a reference to John Darwin, a man from North East England who was famously jailed in July 2008 for faking his own death for the insurance money by disappearing in a canoe out in the North Sea six years earlier.

Almost two weeks after his death, Joe's body is seen floating in the lake. A local woman, who is out walking her dog, discovers Joe's body at the edge of the lake, when her dog sniffs out his corpse. On 22 February 2010, the police inform Gail that they have found a body at the lakes, and they believe that it is Joe's. David tells Tina that Joe is dead and she attacks him because she believes he is lying. Later, Tina and Gail identify Joe's body in the morgue. Tina is devastated to realise that it really is the body of her father.

Four years later in May 2014, Tina is murdered by Rob Donovan (Marc Baylis) and is buried beside her father.

== Reception ==
In August 2009, praise was given to Coronation Street producers by doctors for the soap's painkiller storyline when Joe became addicted. Experts at The Priory Group, which operates drug and alcohol treatment centres across the country, backed the programme's decision to tackle the issue on screen.

Dr Ash Kahn told The Sun newspaper: "Medication abuse can be very dangerous. Misuse of over-the-counter or prescription drugs can lead to dependence that is physical and mental."
