= Midnight Man (British serial) =

2008 British television drama series

- Midnight Man intertitle
- Genre: Thriller
- Written by: David Kane
- Directed by: David Drury
- Starring: James Nesbitt; Catherine McCormack; Rupert Graves; Reece Dinsdale; Ian Puleston-Davies; Zara Turner; Peter Capaldi; Alan Dale
- Composer: Ben Bartlett
- Country of origin: United Kingdom
- Original language: English
- No. of series: 1
- No. of episodes: 3

Production
- Executive producer: Gareth Neame
- Producer: Alan J. Wands
- Cinematography: Simon Richards
- Editor: Chris Ridsdale
- Camera setup: Single
- Running time: 180 min.
- Production company: Carnival Films

Original release
- Network: ITV
- Release: 8 May – 22 May 2008

Midnight Man is a 2008 British television serial produced by Carnival Films for the ITV network. The three-part serial stars James Nesbitt as Max Raban, a former investigative journalist who discovers an international conspiracy involving government policy groups and death squads. It co-stars Catherine McCormack as Alice Ross, a policy advisor who helps Raban, and Reece Dinsdale as Blake, the head of the death squad.

The serial was written by David Kane in response to national paranoia in the wake of the war on terror. Kane was inspired by the way the films Three Days of the Condor, The Parallax View and The Conversation reflected a post-Vietnam paranoia in the United States. The director David Drury had the predominantly nighttime-set serial filmed in the winter, to maximise the use of darkness and keep down production costs. His inspiration for the look of the serial came from The Godfather, which featured rich colours.

Reaction to the serial was generally positive; critics believed the drama was formulaic and uninspired, but appreciated the direction and acting. Nesbitt received a Best Actor nomination at the 2008 ITV3 Crime Thriller Awards.

== Plot ==
Max Raban (played by James Nesbitt) is a former investigative journalist who lost his job when he named a source in a government scandal. The source killed herself and Raban's guilt left him estranged from his wife, Carolyn (played by Zara Turner), and daughter. The guilt manifested itself as phengophobia, a fear of daylight, which Raban seeks to cure by regularly visiting a therapist, Trevor (played by Peter Capaldi), at unsociable hours. To earn money, Raban scours dustbins for celebrity scandals, which he sells to his former editor and best friend whom he has known since university, Jimmy Kerrigan (played by Ian Puleston-Davies).

In Part 1, Raban discovers that two Iranian cousins have been murdered. Some investigation links the killings to a policy group called Defence Concern, headed by Daniel Cosgrave (played by Rupert Graves). Raban believes that Defence Concern had something to do with the killings, and recruits Cosgrave's policy advisor Alice Ross (played by Catherine McCormack) to help him uncover the truth. That night, Raban is approached in a cafe by Blake (played by Reece Dinsdale), a member of the death squad Pugnus Dei ("God's Fist"). Blake tells Raban to keep out of their business. Raban is amused and remains so as Blake makes a telephone call ordering Carolyn's death. As Blake leaves, Raban's smile fades and he runs to Carolyn's house.

Part 2 continues directly from Part 1. Raban finds Carolyn lying dead in her front doorway. The police arrive and suspect Raban of killing her. As his daughter is taken away to stay with her aunt, Raban flees the scene. He arranges to meet with Kerrigan to tell him what he has discovered. Ross accesses a confidential file that she downloaded from Cosgrave's computer and discovers the name of one of the Iranian cousins, proving Raban's claim of Defence Concern's role in the killings. She arranges a meeting with him and Raban meets with Kerrigan. Raban is forced to flee again when Kerrigan double-crosses him and brings the death squad to kill him. He arrives at the meeting place and finds Ross submerged in a bathtub.

In Part 3, Raban revives Ross and they discuss the implications of Defence Concern's actions. Raban believes that Pugnus Dei is being funded by the Validus Group, an American private equity group and a significant global arms dealer. It is headed by Donald Hagan (played by Alan Dale), a former United States Secretary of Defense. In the denouement, Raban holds Hagan at gunpoint until he realises Hagan's death is what the death squad wanted all along. After Raban leaves, Blake shoots Hagan, hoping the death of such a high-ranking official will start a new war on terror. Raban, still being tracked by the police, contacts his daughter and asks her to upload the contents of a CD to the Internet. Pugnus Dei's plot is revealed to the public and Raban is reunited with his daughter.

== Production ==
Writer David Kane pitched a story to Carnival Films executive producer Gareth Neame about a former investigative journalist with a fear of daylight who makes a living from raking through celebrity dustbins for scandals to sell to tabloids. During the writing process, Kane happened upon a news item about a group of ex-police, -soldiers and security experts who had set up an organisation to target pro-Islamists. Using this, Kane and Neame introduced the "death squad" plot. Kane and Neame were influenced by the films Three Days of the Condor, The Parallax View and The Conversation; those films dealt with the paranoia of America brought on by the Vietnam War in the same way Midnight Man dealt with paranoia in Britain following the War in Iraq and the war on terror. The serial was commissioned by ITV1's director of drama Laura Mackie in response to executive chairman Michael Grade's pledge to introduce more contemporary drama to the network. Max Raban was initially based on Benjamin Pell, though the similarity disappeared when the focus on dumpster diving was removed. James Nesbitt was named by Kane and Neame as a potential lead actor early in the planning stages. Neame believed Nesbitt could deliver a "dryer, wryer humour" compared to his other roles. Nesbitt had previously been the subject of a tabloid scandal, and researched investigative journalism with a journalist who "broke one the biggest political scandals of the Thatcher era". As Blake, Reece Dinsdale took the opportunity to play a "baddie" to put a distance between his previous work, such as playing mild-mannered Rick Johnson in two series of The Chase. He discovered that he had the part 24 hours before his wife, Zara Turner, found out she had been cast as Carolyn Raban. Ian Puleston-Davies researched his role as newspaper editor Jimmy Kerrigan by asking his sister, a former journalist, about her previous editors. Alan Dale read for his part because Nesbitt is one of his favourite actors.

Filming began the week beginning 22 October 2007. To keep production costs down, filming took place at a time of year when the nights began earlier, allowing the cast and crew to work half-days instead of all night. Extras and minor characters were drawn from those attending an NFL game taking place at Wembley including a sterling debut performance from the unknown Phillip Wright. The production crew arrived to set up locations in the afternoon and worked with the cast through to 11 p.m. The initial script drafts included 49 separate locations. Director David Drury and producer Alan J. Wands worked through the script and, by merging the settings of some scenes, reduced the locations by a third. Drury scheduled time for the actors to rehearse on location, saying, "I'm a great believer in rehearsals to find the characters. I work a specific way, sitting down in 'family groups' with the actors and script and talking about relationships. I go onto the set with just myself and the actors and nobody else, so that they can get to know the space. Only when we are comfortable will I invite the crew in." He did not want to film London as a cliché, so did not include shots of Big Ben and other major landmarks: "I want to give [...] the action a contemporary edge in an environment that was recognisably London without looking film noir." In contrast to other contemporary thrillers that feature the use of hand-held camera, Drury and director of photography Simon Richards used traditional single-camera movement to emulate the style of The Godfather ("rich colour and classical style with no trickiness"). Unlike other Carnival Films television series such as Hotel Babylon, Midnight Man was not filmed in high-definition; Richards believed that film offered the highest definition for locations that used natural street lighting. Instead of spending part of the budget on a second unit crew, Richards and assistant cameraman Jim Jolliffe filmed establishing shots and pick-ups during principal photography while there was a break. They sometimes stayed behind after the cast and other crew had wrapped in order to shoot scenes of London nightlife.

== Reception ==
Reviewing Part 1 the day after it aired, Tim Teeman of The Times wrote that Midnight Man stretched credibility; "If, as the drama insisted, so many people of a certain group and political persuasion had been killed, a newspaper—many newspapers—would be investigating it." Teeman also expressed dissatisfaction that Midnight Man "imput[ed] a kind of bigotry into its audience [that] it didn't have", and mocked the portrayal of print journalism. Hermione Eyre of The Independent on Sunday questioned the way exposition was put into a character's mouth, calling it "such a badly disguised way of telegraphing information to the audience it's practically postmodern", but concluded that Midnight Man "promises to be a relaxing sort of series, free from realism or originality". Aidan Smith for Scotland on Sunday called it "gripping stuff". In The Spectator, Simon Hoggart wrote, "I have known many investigative journalists, some of whom have written articles which were extremely discomfiting for the powers that be. Yet not one of them has come home to find their wife with a bullet through her forehead. Not one! The art of thriller writing is to keep one foot in the surreal, the unthinkable and the horrible, and the other firmly in reality. Skip to one side or another and you’ve lost. I'm afraid that as the wife hit the doormat, I laughed. I shan't watch the last two episodes. I'm afraid the little girl is going to be next."

Critiquing Part 2, Harry Venning of The Stage felt cheated that Raban had overcome his fear of daylight by simply putting on a pair of sunglasses. Echoing Teeman and Eyre's reviews, Venning called it "low on plausibility" but praised the soundtrack and the pacing. Alison Graham, the television editor for Radio Times, reviewed all three episodes. Part 1 was selected as "Pick of the Day" for 8 May. Graham called the premise "tiresome" but expressed surprise that Raban was a "maverick journalist" instead of a "maverick cop". Reviewing Part 3, Graham described the characters' quirks (Raban's phengophobia, Ross's obsessive-compulsive disorder) as being "grafted on" in order to flesh them out. She concluded with "By the end [of the episode], you probably won't care who's chasing whom, much less why." In an extended column, Graham presented a faux script draft of "Maverick Man" having a conversation with a psychiatrist, where he describes himself as "a one-dimensional character trapped in a needlessly complicated and unbelievable conspiracy thriller".

Part 1 won the 9 p.m. timeslot, with overnight ratings of 3.8 million viewers and an 18% audience share, beating The Invisibles, Heroes, Grand Designs Live and House, airing on other main channels. Part 2 lost 300,000 viewers but still won the timeslot with 3.5 million viewers and an 18% share. Part 3 drew its timeslot with The Invisibles, with 3.1 million. Final ratings recorded by the Broadcasters' Audience Research Board, accounting for DVR viewings, were 4.10 million, 3.74 million, and 3.32 million respectively. Nesbitt was nominated in the Best Actor category at the 2008 ITV3 Crime Thriller Awards for his role as Raban.
