= Graeme Proctor =

Fictional character from Coronation Street

- Coronation Street character
- Portrayed by: Craig Gazey
- Duration: 2008–2011
- First appearance: 18 April 2008
- Last appearance: 13 June 2011
- Introduced by: Steve Frost (2008) Kim Crowther (2008)
- Crossover appearances: The Jeremy Kyle Show (2010)
In-universe information
- Occupation: Butcher; Window cleaner
- Father: Adam Proctor
- Mother: Kathleen Proctor
- Wife: Xin Chiang (2011–present)
- Uncles: Derek

Graeme Proctor is a fictional character from the British ITV soap opera Coronation Street. Portrayed by Craig Gazey, the character first appeared on-screen during the episode airing on 18 April 2008.

The character is also noted for his eccentric behaviour, outlandish one-liners and his habit of singing, often whilst walking alone. After the character had only been part of the serial for a short period he became a firm favourite with viewers, with Gazey winning three "Best Newcomer" awards and "Best Comedy Performance" for his portrayal. It was announced in January 2011 that he would leave during summer 2011. The character departed on 13 June 2011.

== Development ==
=== Creation and casting ===
The character first appears in April 2008 as the cellmate of David Platt (Jack P. Shepherd) in the detention centre, and is a permanent feature in the character's scenes in the centre. He then last appears in June when David is released. After the character impressed bosses the character Graeme returned on 10 November 2008 on a permanent basis.

Craig Gazey won the part in an audition. The actor was not given a script until his first day of filming. Gazey did not know he was to become a permanent member of the cast until after his first stint was completed, as he confirmed in an interview with website Digital Spy: "It was never on the cards, but everyone was so supportive of me and my character. On my last day of filming of my first ever block, the crew gave me a clap to say goodbye and they all said 'Goodbye Craig', while a couple of them added 'for now' on the end." He told female first that he had to throw himself back into the role as being a member of the cast is like being on a 'fast train'. Gazey has also talked about the impact his character has made with his popularity with the public stating: "It's all quite overwhelming, really. I've seen that there's been a bit of a buzz about Graeme. I think a lot of its down to the writing, though." In early 2010 Gazey announced that he signed a contract that would see him portraying the character into March 2011.

=== Personality ===
Graeme's character often provided comic relief through his eccentric behaviour and the many outlandish one-liners he accidentally comes out with. Gazey said, "He's a bit of a mentalist. I'd say he was eccentric, too. I call him a fantasising scally. He's always going off on these little rants. He's quite switched on, though. Just a bit mad and playful." Graeme believes that the worst thing the Romans did was to invent central heating, and has a weakness for setting fires. He set the Windass kitchen on fire, and planned to do the same to his stolen car.

It was later revealed that the character was to take on the speaking mannerisms of Fred Elliot using some of his famous sayings. ITV also spoke about the character wanting viewers to know that he has a soft side stating: "Graeme will not be an out-and-out bad lad. He'll just be easily led and confused between right and wrong. He'll definitely have a soft side"

In mid-2009 Gazey spoke out once more about how his character's want of a better life and the storyliners' ideas to send his character in a different direction away from David Platt. Of this it was said: "Graeme's developed quite a lot. The big difference between then (2008) and now is the fact that he's settled down and become more grounded. We've got some scenes coming up soon where he says to David that he's really wanting a normal life and that he doesn't want to get into trouble. He wants to keep his job and wants to do well in what he's doing. And not start any more fires..." Gazey also made it clear from an early point that his character would not develop into one of Weatherfield's bad guys. Also commenting that: "Graeme was quite dark at the beginning, a bit mental, but he's a loveable rogue really."

In 2010 Gazey explained his character's laid back attitude to whom he spends time with stating, "It's great that he bobs in and out of situations – you can put him anywhere and he's unfazed by anyone or anything. You can put him with the oldies like Betty, then you throw him with the young ones and he just fits." Going on to talk of how his then, impending storyline involving a new love interest would impact on his unfazed attitude he said: "It's time to see him out of his depth. That's probably where the love interest will help. He's relatively new to the relationship scene – I don't think he's ever had anything like that before. To see him not feel as comfortable as he is usually – to faze the unfazed."

=== Departure ===
On 6 January 2011, Gazey confirmed his departure from Coronation Street, just short of three years in the role, announcing his intentions to pursue other roles. Of his departure, Gazey stated, "When I first joined the cast I had no idea how much I'd enjoy being part of such an amazing team. But I became an actor for the diversity of the work and the opportunity to play different roles. I also really miss working in theatre. I feel this is the right time to leave after two and a half fantastic years playing a unique and brilliantly written character. I don't know what the future holds, but I hope I will be given the opportunity to show my versatility as an actor and work on different projects." Gazey made his final screen appearance on 13 June 2011.

== Storylines ==
David Platt (Jack P. Shepherd) met Graeme when both were in prison. After arriving on Coronation Street, he first stays with his former cellmate, but later moves out. Graeme steals a sports car on the day he is released and brings it back to the Platts' house to the indignation of David's girlfriend, Tina McIntyre (Michelle Keegan). On 17 November 2008, Graeme, David and Tina break into the Windasses' house next-door, vandalise the kitchen and set fire to the fittings as Gary Windass and his uncle Len had stolen tools belonging to Tina's father, Joe (Reece Dinsdale). Realising he needs to get rid of the car he stole, Graeme enlists David's help but in a twist of events, the Windasses steal the vehicle. Graeme continues supporting the Platts when the Windasses move next door to them.

Graeme dresses as Liz McDonald after being encouraged by Teresa Bryant, one of the character's comedic storylines. (2009)

Graeme later goes on to get a job at Elliott and Sons Butchers run by Ashley Peacock (Steve Arnold). Graeme is paid by Steve McDonald (Simon Gregson) to punch him in the face so that he can go to court to help Becky Granger (Katherine Kelly). Graeme punches Steve so hard that Steve crashes through the fencing of the smokers' shelter. The character gradually takes on the speaking mannerisms of Fred Elliott (John Savident) by using some of his famous sayings. Fred's son, Ashley, becomes annoyed by Graeme's behaviour and he is forced to apologise. Graeme then starts his own gardening business and later begins a window cleaning service.

During Teresa Bryant's (Karen Henthorn) Vicars and Tarts party, Graeme arrives dressed like Liz McDonald (Beverley Callard). He expresses a lot of interest in dressing that way and particularly enjoys the "freedom" in wearing a skirt. Liz is then upset after seeing Graeme, realising that Teresa asked guests to dress in her style. When Rosie Webster's (Helen Flanagan) modelling career involves skimpy outfits, Graeme begins pursuing her, much to her annoyance, though she turns to him when it suits her e.g. getting her drinks or concealing an embarrassing poster of her. He tells David that he cannot stop thinking about Rosie, much to David's amusement, but also tries to woo hairdresser Natasha Blakeman (Rachel Leskovac), to no avail.

After the death of Joe McIntyre (Reece Dinsdale) in February 2010, Graeme supports Tina in her grief. Tina appreciates him looking after her and in June 2010, they start a relationship. Tina's ex-boyfriends, Jason Grimshaw (Ryan Thomas) and David, are not pleased by this news and Graeme falls out with David. After a brief rekindling of the friendships between David and both Tina and Graeme, they all fall out again when Tina tells Graeme that she thought David was about to rape her during a confrontation. Graeme reacts angrily to this but she suggests they simply ignore David in future. However, David runs Graeme over whilst driving his grandmother Audrey's car. Graeme is rushed to hospital with broken ribs and punctured lungs, and doctors tell Tina that his chances of survival are small. Graeme comes round eventually and Tina is overjoyed but when David visits him, Graeme promises that he will do whatever it takes to send him to prison. In a further twist, it emerges that David actually had an epileptic seizure at the wheel, and did not set out to kill Graeme; he is cleared. Tina is later relieved in December 2010 when Graeme arrives safe and well after a tram crashes on to the street and he subsequently helps with the rescue. Graeme is upset when he later finds out that Ashley was killed in the disaster.

In February 2011, he and Tina go to a restaurant for Valentine's Day and meet Tina's friend, Xin Chiang (Elizabeth Tan), who is upset as she has money worries. Tina offers Xin their spare room but landlord Dev Alahan (Jimmi Harkishin) tells them he will put the rent up if Xin moves in, so she changes her mind. In March 2011, the flat is repaired so Tina and Graeme move back in. In April, Xin tells Graeme and Tina that her visa has expired and she will have to leave the country if it is not renewed. Without consulting Graeme, Tina tells Xin that Graeme will marry her so she can stay in the country, to which Graeme eventually reluctantly agrees. On his wedding day, Norris Cole (Malcolm Hebden) is shocked to find Graeme and Tina kissing and threatens to reveal the truth but Tina begs him to keep quiet and he agrees. Graeme's relationship with Tina begins to deteriorate as he and Xin keep up the pretence of being a genuine couple. In early June 2011, Graeme and Xin become increasingly attracted to each other and finally after a heated argument, they sleep together and Xin asks Graeme to decide who he wants to be with, her or Tina. Initially Graeme chooses Tina but as Xin prepares to move to Edinburgh, Graeme realises that he cannot face life without her. He ends his relationship with Tina and Graeme and Xin stay with David after Tina kicks them out of the flat. Xin and Graeme prepare to move to London after Tina threatens to report them to immigration but she eventually forgives Graeme and watches as the couple leave Weatherfield in a taxi.

== Reception ==
Actor Craig Gazey won an awards in the Best Newcomer categories at the British Soap Awards and The Inside Soap Awards in 2009, he won "Best Comedy Performance" at the 2010 British Soap Awards. Kris Green of media website Digital Spy commented about the fact that the character had become a firm Weatherfield favourite and the character's eccentric behaviour and outlandish one-liners ooze classic Corrie comedy. On his character's popularity Gazey commented that his main fanbase for the character are "Young, chavvy girls love him, but mums and grans adore him too." At the 2010 National Television Awards Gazey was nominated in the category of Best Newcomer, which he subsequently won. Inside Soap commented on Graeme stating: "Graeme was the oddball neighbour, trying to bag any girl in sight and failing miserably .. but the butcher is everyone's hero (not to mention the viewers secret crush) and now he's living with the hottest girl in soap".
