= Hugo Speer =

English actor and director (born 1968)

- Born: Hugo Alexander Speer; 17 March 1968 (age 58); Harrogate, West Riding of Yorkshire, (Note: Before 1 April 1974 Harrogate was in the West Riding of Yorkshire.) England
- Education: Harrogate Grammar School; Arts Educational Schools, London
- Occupations: Actor, director
- Years active: 1992–present
- Spouse: Vivienne Harvey (m. 2015)

Hugo Alexander Speer (born 17 March 1968) is an English actor and director. He is best known for playing Guy in The Full Monty (1997), Inspector Valentine in Father Brown (2013–2014), Captain Treville in The Musketeers (2014–2016), Lucius in Britannia (2017–2019), Frank Young in Marcella (2018–2020) and DI David Bradford in London Kills (2019–present).

== Early life and education ==
Hugo Speer was born in Harrogate in the then West Riding of Yorkshire and educated at Harrogate Grammar School. He studied acting at the Arts Educational Schools, London.

== Career ==
=== Acting ===
Speer began his acting career appearing in the TV series McCallum, The Bill, and Heartbeat. He played a minor role in the film Bhaji on the Beach before his first notable appearance as Guy in the film The Full Monty. Following this film's worldwide success he went on to appear in Swing (1999), Deathwatch and The Interpreter (playing Nicole Kidman's brother). However, most of his work has been on TV, including sitcom Men Behaving Badly, dramas Clocking Off, The Last Detective, Boudica (2003), and The Rotters' Club (2005), as well as the 2005 BBC adaptation of Dickens' Bleak House. In 2006, he appeared in the postal worker drama Sorted. In 2008, he starred alongside Martine McCutcheon in Echo Beach. In 2011 he played a repairman whose repairs "come to life" in the supernatural drama Haven, based on a Stephen King story. Speer also provides narration for ITV series, Cops with Cameras, Channel 5's The Bachelor, Channel 4 series 999: What's Your Emergency? and the BBC series Seaside Rescue. He appears as John Foster in the penultimate and final episodes of the fourth series of Skins.

Hugo Speer also narrated a factual programme on Discovery HD called Gold Divers, and Alaska: The Last Frontier.

Since 2010 he has played the lead character of DCI John Stone in eight series of the BBC Radio 4 police drama Stone. From 2013 to 2014 he starred as Inspector Valentine in the new version of Father Brown on BBC TV in the first series and the first episode of the second series. He made a return appearance in the 2020 episode 8.10 "The Tower of Lost Souls"

Starting in 2014, Speer appeared as Captain Treville in The Musketeers. The series concluded in 2016.

Since 2018 he has played the character Lucius in the historical fantasy drama series Britannia, which is produced by Sky Atlantic and Amazon Prime.

=== Directing ===
In 2010 Hugo Speer made his directorial début with the short film MAM starring Josie Lawrence, Paul Barber and Ronan Carter. The family drama about a 12-year-old boy was scripted by Vivienne Harvey. It was produced by Vigo Films and shot mostly in Sheffield.

== Personal life ==
On 19 February 2015, Speer married Glaswegian actress, writer and director Vivienne Harvey.

In 2009, Speer was involved in a car accident when his BMW crashed into a traffic island while driving after drinking over the legal limit. He was returning from a wake. No one was hurt in the incident and Speer was banned from driving for eighteen months.

Speer moved to London after his success in The Full Monty and lived there for fifteen years but moved back to his native North Yorkshire. His pastimes include falconry, walking and music. He is a supporter of Leeds United.

He is friends with fellow actor Andrew Scarborough, whom he worked with in the Hearts and Bones for two series. Speer and Scarborough have known each other since they were children.

=== Misconduct allegations ===
In July 2022, Speer was sacked from a planned follow-up television version of The Full Monty made by Disney+ following allegations of "inappropriate conduct". A spokesperson for the actor said Speer denied the allegations and would challenge them.

In June 2023, Speer elaborated his side of the story to The Daily Mail. He stated that a female runner had walked in on him in his trailer whilst he was naked.

== Filmography ==
=== Film ===
Year	Title	Role	Notes
1993	Bhaji on the Beach	Andy / white youth	
1994	Mainline Run	Taro	
1997	The Full Monty	Guy	
1999	Swing	Martin 'Marty' Luxford	
2001	Barnie et ses petites contrariétés	Mark	
2002	Deathwatch	Sgt. David Tate	
2003	Boudica	Dervalloc	
2005	The Interpreter	Simon Broome	
2010	Carmen's Kiss	Joe	
2011	Late Bloomers	Peter	
2012	Chiapas the Heart of Coffee	John	
2013	Nymphomaniac: Vol. I	Mr. H	
2016	When I Grow Up...	Sergeant James	Short film
2019	Trick or Treat	The Comedian	
2025	Desperate Journey	Pierre	

=== Television ===
Year	Title	Role	Notes
1992–1996	The Bill	Dave Williamson (1992) /Sean Tranter (1996)	2 episodes
1993	Woof!	Nick Bailey	1 episode
1993–2009	Heartbeat	Chris Rawlings (1993) / Vic Needham (2009)	“Wall of Silence” (1993), “Deadlier Than The Male” (2009)
1994	So Haunt Me	Terry	1 episode
1996	Sharman	Mayles	1 episode
1997	McCallum	Dr. Aidan Petit	3 episodes
1997	Men Behaving Badly	Tony 2	1 episode
1997	The Drew Carey Show	Himself	1 episode
1998	An Englishman in New York	Davey	Television film
1999	Shockers: Ibiza – £99 Return	Alex	Television film
2000–2001	Hearts and Bones	Richard Rose	12 episodes
2001	Do or Die	Nicholas	Miniseries, 2 episodes
2002	Green-Eyed Monster	Ray	Television film
2002	An Angel for May	Bob Harris	Television film
2003	The Debt	DS Edward 'Ed' Foster	Television film
2003	40	Robert / Rob	Miniseries, 3 episodes
2003	Clocking Off	Stuart Savage	1 episode
2003	Sons & Lovers	Walter Morel	Television film
2005	Bleak House	Sergeant George	Miniseries, 10 episodes
2005	Messiah: The Harrowing	DI Jack Price	Miniseries, 3 episodes
2005	The Last Detective	Sergeant Stephen Kay	Episode: "Towpaths of Glory"
2005	The Rotters' Club	Bill Anderton	Miniseries, 3 episodes
2006	Sorted	Charlie King	6 episodes
2006	Love Lies Bleeding	Stuart Milburn	Television film
2007	Fanny Hill	Mr. H	Miniseries, 2 episodes
2007	Silent Witness	DI Dan Jennings	“Double Dare: Part 1 & 2”
2008	Agatha Christie’s Miss Marple	James Abbot	“Murder Is Easy”
2008	Echo Beach	Mark Penwarden	12 episodes
2008	Moving Wallpaper	Hugo Speer as himself	Episode: #1.6, #1.12
2008	Moving Wallpaper: The Mole	Hugo Speer as himself	Episode: #1.9
2009	Taggart	Ron Cassidy	“So Long Baby”
2010	Moving On	Dave	“Losing My Religion”
2010	Skins	John Foster	“Effy”, “Everyone”
2010	Five Days	Supt. James Carpenter	4 episodes
2011	Death in Paradise	DI Charlie Hulme	1 episode
2011	Haven	Louis Pufahl	1 episode
2011	Vera	Keith Mantel	Episode: “Telling Tales”
2011	Midsomer Murders	Geoff Rogers	“Not in My Backyard”
2011–2012	Bedlam	Warren Bettany / Warren	12 episode
2012	Watson & Oliver	Various sketch show characters	3 episodes
2013	Common Ground	Jack	Television short, 1 episode
2013–2014, 2020	Father Brown	Inspector Valentine / Chief Inspector Valentine	12 episodes
2014–2016	The Musketeers	Treville / Minister Treville	28 episodes
2017–2019	Britannia	Lucius	13 episodes
2018–2020	Marcella	Frank Young	9 episodes
2019–	London Kills	DI David Bradford	4 series, 20 episodes
2021	Shadow and Bone	Lieutenant Bohdan	4 episodes
2023	The Full Monty	Guy	4 episodes
