= Winter Flight =

1984 film by Roy Battersby

Winter Flight is a 1984 British TV movie directed by Roy Battersby, and starring Reece Dinsdale, Nicola Cowper and Sean Bean. It was part of David Puttnam's First Love series.

== Production ==
Goldcrest Films invested £581,000 and received £388,000. They had a loss of £193,000.

Another account says the budget was £506,000.
