= McCallum (TV series) =

British television crime drama series (1995–1998)

- Genre: Crime drama
- Created by: Stuart Hepburn; Mike Cullen
- Written by: Various
- Directed by: Various
- Starring: John Hannah; Gerard Murphy; Zara Turner; James Saxon; Richard O'Callaghan; Alex Walkinshaw; Suzanna Hamilton; Richard Moore; Nathaniel Parker; Eva Pope
- Country of origin: United Kingdom
- Original language: English
- No. of series: 2
- No. of episodes: 9

Production
- Executive producers: Robert Love; Philip Hinchcliffe
- Producer: Murray Ferguson
- Running time: 120 minutes (w./advertisements)
- Production company: Scottish Television

Original release
- Network: ITV
- Release: 28 December 1995 – 7 December 1998

Related
- Rebus (2000-2007)

McCallum is a British television series that was produced by Scottish Television and ran from 28 December 1995 to 7 December 1998.

Dr Iain McCallum was the original lead character, played by Scottish actor John Hannah. McCallum is a forensic pathologist working in the morgue of St. Patrick's Hospital in East End of London, who travels by Triumph Motorcycle, is generally charming and solves murders. The character has romantic involvements with two of the other principal characters, Joanna Sparks (played by Suzanna Hamilton), and later Dr. Angela Moloney (played by Zara Turner). The last episode did not include McCallum and Angela as the story stated that they had taken jobs in America. They were replaced by Dr. Dan Gallagher (Nathaniel Parker) and Dr. Charley Fielding (Eva Pope). The Triumph is a Hinckley Triumph and is either a Thunderbird or Adventurer.

== Cast ==
- John Hannah as Dr. Iain McCallum
- Zara Turner as Dr. Angela Moloney
- Gerard Murphy as DI Braken
- Alex Walkinshaw as DS Small
- James Saxon as Fuzzy Brightons
- Richard O'Callaghan as Bobby Sykes
- Richard Moore as Sir Paddy Penfold
- Suzanna Hamilton as Joanna Sparks
- Charlotte Randle as Clare Gilmore
- Hugo Speer as Dr. Aidan Petit
- Nathaniel Parker as Dr. Dan Gallagher
- Eva Pope as Dr. Charley Fielding

== Episodes ==
=== Pilot (1995) ===
No.	Title	Directed by	Written by	Original release date	Viewers (millions)
1	"The Key to My Heart"	Patrick Lau	Stuart Hepburn	28 December 1995	TBA
McCallum investigates when the body of a missing Vietnamese banker washes ashore, but soon has other problems to worry about when a female police officer that he has been having an affair with is found dead - and the police label him as the prime suspect.

=== Series 1 (1997) ===
No.	Title	Directed by	Written by	Original release date	Viewers (millions)
1	"Sacrifice"	Stuart Hepburn	Sarah Hellings	13 January 1997	TBA
1	"Sacrifice"	Stuart Hepburn	Sarah Hellings	20 January 1997	TBA
McCallum investigates when a well-known baker is found dead at the bottom of the stairs in his award-winning baker's shop and his family try to cover up the circumstances surrounding his death.
2	"Touch"	Ben Rostul	Richard Holthouse	27 January 1997	TBA
2	"Touch"	Ben Rostul	Richard Holthouse	3 February 1997	TBA
McCallum investigates the death of a young Brazilian prostitute is who is found dead after having been scalded. However, the situation is complicated when the post mortem reveals that she died from a superbug bacterial infection and that she had previously suffered from two drug-induced heart attacks.
3	"Dead But Still Breathing"	Mike Cullen	Richard Laxton	10 February 1997	TBA
3	"Dead But Still Breathing"	Mike Cullen	Richard Laxton	17 February 1997	TBA
McCallum finds that he has become a moving target when a killer with a grudge against him attempts to exact revenge with a combination of poisonings and threatening telephone calls.

=== Series 2 (1997–98) ===
No.	Title	Directed by	Written by	Original release date	Viewers (millions)
1	"City of the Dead"	Mike Cullen	Richard Holthouse	30 December 1997	TBA
1	"City of the Dead"	Mike Cullen	Richard Holthouse	6 January 1998	TBA
McCallum finds himself defending his own colleague after his absence from work results in a tragic road accident which results in the death of an elderly man.
2	"Harvest"	Ben Rostul	Christopher King	13 January 1998	TBA
2	"Harvest"	Ben Rostul	Christopher King	20 January 1998	TBA
McCallum is convinced that a serial killer is at work when a mutilated body is found in a sewer - and more bodies turn up with graze marks and organs missing.
3	"Dead Man's Fingers"	Jane Hollowood	David Tucker	3 February 1998	TBA
McCallum finds himself implicated in the death of a hospital worker when she names him in her diary as the father of her unborn baby.
4	"Running on Empty"	Mike Cullen	Peter Smith	17 February 1998	TBA
4	"Running on Empty"	Mike Cullen	Peter Smith	24 February 1998	TBA
McCallum is suspicious after his examination of two bodies reveals no cause of death - but when the lab is broken into, the theft of vital samples proves to be a clue.

=== Special (1998) ===
No.	Title	Directed by	Written by	Original release date	Viewers (millions)
1	"Beyond Good and Evil"	Russell Gascoigne	Richard Holthouse	7 December 1998	8.18m
Gallagher goes on the hunt for the necrophilia-like murderers of two women who have kidnapped his girlfriend. Will he get to her in time, or will she become their latest victim?
