= Zara Turner =

Northern Irish actor

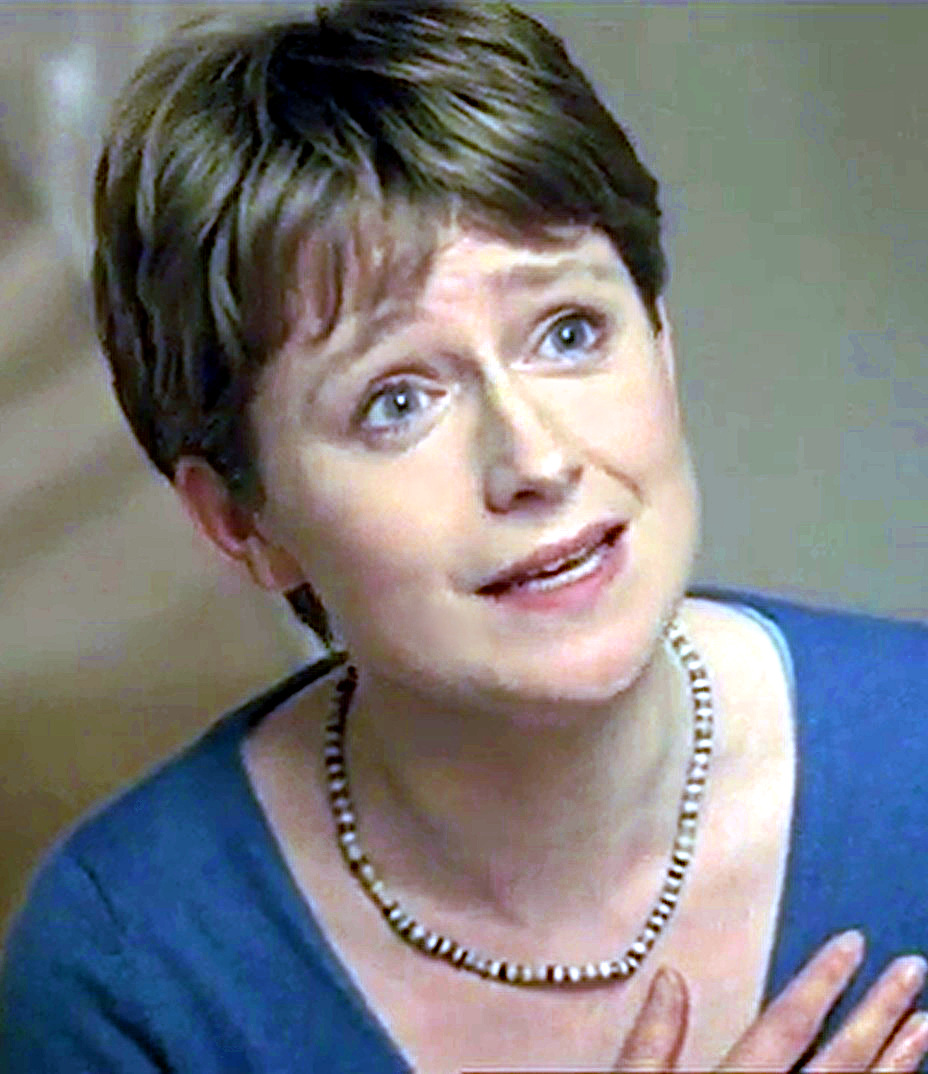
Zara Turner in Midnight Man 2008

Zara Turner is an actress from Northern Ireland.

== Career ==
Turner appeared alongside Gwyneth Paltrow and John Hannah in the 1998 romantic drama film Sliding Doors, and as Dr Angela Moloney (again with John Hannah) in the television series McCallum (1995–1998). In 2001, she appeared in the comedy film On the Nose as Carol Lenahan, with Dan Aykroyd and Robbie Coltrane.

Turner has won the Best Actress award at the Reims International Television Festival and the Golden FIPA at the 2004 Festival International de Programmes Audiovisuels.

== Personal life ==
Turner is married to fellow actor Reece Dinsdale and they live in Yorkshire, England with their children.

== Filmography ==
Film

- Sliding Doors (1998) as Anna
- Resurrection Man (1998) as Dr Elizabeth Ryan
- The Waiting Time (1999) as Tracy Barnes
- The Blind Date (2000) as Lucy Kennedy
- Where There's Smoke (2000) as Kate Powell
- On the Nose (2001) as Carol Lenahan

Television

- Father Ted (1995) as Laura Sweeney
- The Investigator (1997) as Major Fiona Lang
- McCallum (1998) as Dr Angela Moloney
- Touch and Go (1998 TV Movie) as Alison Wood
- Forgotten (1999) as Natalie Turner
- Any Time Now (2000) as Kate O'Dowd
- Holy Cross (2003) as Ann McClure
- The Brief (2004) as Polly Graham
- Where the Heart Is (2006) as Mary
- Midnight Man (2008) as Carolyn Raban
- The Bill (2009) as Candice Fuller
- The Body Farm (2011) as Patsy Faye
