= Love Lies Bleeding (TV series) =

- Genre: Crime drama; Thriller
- Created by: Paul Coates
- Written by: Paul Coates
- Directed by: David Drury
- Starring: Martin Kemp; Hugo Speer; Claire Goose; Elizabeth Berrington; Reece Dinsdale; Fraser James
- Country of origin: United Kingdom
- Original language: English
- No. of series: 1
- No. of episodes: 2

Production
- Executive producer: Richard Broke
- Producer: David Noble
- Cinematography: Simon Richards
- Editor: Ian Farr
- Running time: 70 minutes
- Production company: Granada Television

Original release
- Network: ITV
- Release: 27 February – 28 February 2006

Love Lies Bleeding is a two-part British thriller crime drama, first broadcast on ITV between 27 and 28 February 2006. The programme follows the story of self-made millionaire Mark Terry (Martin Kemp), whose life is turned upside down by the unexpected return of an old school friend, Stuart Milburn (Hugo Speer), who is determined to seek revenge for Terry's failure to acknowledge his part in the manslaughter of their schoolteacher, who collapsed and died after a schoolboy prank went horribly wrong. As Milburn sets up a chain of events to ensure Terry's downfall, he finds he is slowly running out of friends - or people to turn to, and his only hope is to go on the run. The programme was broadcast over two nights, with each part earning 5.81 and 4.56 million viewers respectively. Love Lies Bleeding was released on DVD in Australia on 3 September 2009 by Roadshow Entertainment.

== Plot ==
One night, self made millionaire Mark Terry (Martin Kemp) is in the middle of a blazing row with his wife Zara (Claire Goose) when an old school friend, Stuart Milburn (Hugo Speer) turns up at his door. Stuart, now a Detective Inspector, informs Mark that he is back in town after transferring from Leeds following the death of his police partner at the hands of Thomas Jordic (Wayne Michaels), a high collar criminal whom he has never been able to nail. Having recently suffered the loss of his baby son to cot death, Zara is struggling to interact with Mark, leading to him spending more and more time with Stuart. One Friday night, Stuart takes Mark out to a local club and shows him surveillance pictures of a man supposedly kissing Zara. Mark is furious, and proclaims he is going to kill her. Stuart calms him down, and pairs him up with a date, whose flat he ends up returning to. The next morning, Mark awakens and begins to stumble home. Stuart approaches him, and says that he has a surprise. He drives Mark out to a deserted field close to a nearby motorway, where Mark notices that Zara's car is parked. As Mark walks up to the car, he is shocked to find Zara dead, having slit her wrists. Stuart, however, claims that he killed her at Mark's request. Stuart claims that during their time at the club, Mark became so inebriated that he offered him £100,000 to kill Zara, in front of a number of witnesses.

Distressed at his wife's death, Mark realises he has no choice but to play the situation, and Stuart convinces him to head to the police station earlier the next day to report Zara missing. Mark meets with one of Stuart's colleagues, DI Colin Dunne (Reece Dinsdale), who lists Zara as a missing person. Later that day, Stuart confronts Mark and says that it is time to repay the favour. Stuart asks Mark to confront and murder Jordic outside one of his strip clubs in the West End of London. Stuart drives Mark to Jordic's club, and provides him with a gun to shoot Jordic. However, during the attack, Mark bottles it and leaves Jordic beaten, but alive. Stuart disposes of the gun and tells Mark to inform the police that he and Jordic instigated the attack, in order to prevent Jordic from pressing charges against him. However, when he arrives at the police station, DI Dunne informs him that Jordic has in fact been murdered.

== Cast ==
- Martin Kemp — Mark Terry
- Hugo Speer — DI Stuart Milburn
- Claire Goose — Zara Terry
- Elizabeth Berrington — Joanna Sims
- Reece Dinsdale — DI Colin Dunne
- Fraser James — DS Ray Chancer
- Jamie Knox — Young Mark Terry
- Perry Allen — Young Stuart Milburn
- Lucinda Dryzek — Young Joanna Sims
- John Arthur — Superintendent Seaborne
- Wayne Michaels — Thomas Jordic
- Michael N. Harbour — Paddy Bankhead
