= Reece Dinsdale =

English actor (born 1959)

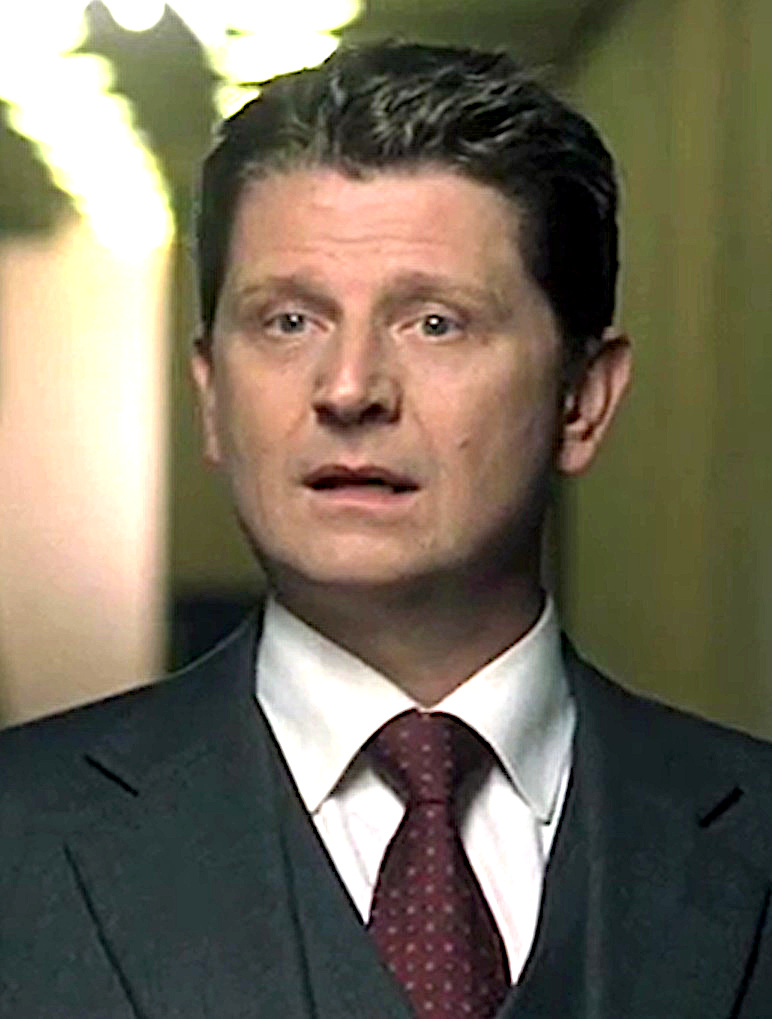
- Dinsdale in Midnight Man 2008
- Born: 6 August 1959 (age 67); Altofts, West Riding of Yorkshire, England
- Education: Guildhall School of Music and Drama
- Occupations: Actor; director
- Years active: 1980–present
- Spouse: Zara Turner
- Children: 2

Reece Dinsdale (born 6 August 1959) is an English actor and director. His credits include Threads (1984), A Private Function (1984), Winter Flight (1984), Home to Roost (1985–1990), Haggard (1990), ID (1995), Hamlet (1996), Murder in Mind (2000), Spooks (2003), Conviction (2004), Ahead of the Class (2005), Love Lies Bleeding (2006), Life on Mars (2006), The Chase (2006), Silent Witness (2008), Midnight Man (2008), Moving On (2011), Waterloo Road (2011), The Knife That Killed Me (2014).

His most notable roles were as Joe McIntyre, in 157 episodes of the long running soap Coronation Street (2008–2010), and as Paul Ashdale in 87 episodes of Emmerdale (2020–2021).

== Early life ==
Dinsdale was born in Normanton, West Yorkshire. He was just 12 years old when he played the lead role in Tom Sawyer at Normanton Grammar School. Dinsdale trained at the Guildhall School of Music and Drama from 1977, graduating in 1980.

== Career ==
After initially working in theatre in Exeter, Nottingham and Birmingham and at the Edinburgh Festival, Dinsdale got his first TV role in the Granada thriller Knife Edge in 1981. He followed this up by appearing in Out on the Floor a single drama for the BBC, in 1982. This led to him being cast as Albert in Agatha Christie's Partners in Crime series for ITV in 1982.

More theatre followed with Beethoven's Tenth with Peter Ustinov at the Vaudeville Theatre, London and the highly acclaimed Red Saturday at the Royal Court. He played Jimmy Kemp in Threads (1984), a-soon-to-be-father and husband caught up in a nuclear attack on Sheffield. 1984 also saw Dinsdale appearing in one of his first feature films, Alan Bennett's A Private Function, and the TV movie Winter Flight opposite Nicola Cowper.

Glamour Night, another single drama for the BBC, followed in 1984 before Dinsdale was cast as Matthew Willows in the British sitcom Home to Roost written by Eric Chappell and co-starring John Thaw. Dinsdale played Thaw's unruly teenage son Matthew who comes to live with his estranged father after his mother throws him out.

Interspersed with this were many appearances on stage, including the award-winning play Observe the Sons of Ulster Marching Towards the Somme at the Hampstead Theatre, London, in 1986, Woundings and Don Carlos at the Royal Exchange Theatre, Manchester, and Old Year's Eve at the Royal Shakespeare Company. On television he had leading roles in the three-part series Take Me Home, and The Attractions, and the single drama Coppers opposite Tim Roth. He also played Fearnot in Jim Henson's The Storyteller.

Dinsdale played the leading role of Jack Rover in Wild Oats in the inaugural production at the newly built West Yorkshire Playhouse in 1990. He then appeared in Young Catherine, a miniseries in which he played the Grand Duke Peter. He then appeared at the National Theatre in David Hare's Racing Demon.

From 1990 to 1992, he co-starred in Haggard, a comedy set in the late 18th century. In 1994, he played the leading role in ID, a British feature film charting the demise of a police officer who goes undercover to root out a firm of football hooligans. Based on a true story, Dinsdale won the International Critics Award for best actor at the Geneva Film Festival.

Dinsdale has continued to play leading roles on both stage and screen. Highlights include two series of Thief Takers in which he played the central role of Charlie Scott, and Kenneth Branagh's film of Hamlet in which he played Guildenstern opposite Timothy Spall's Rosencrantz. He guested in Spooks, Life on Mars, Murder in Mind and Silent Witness.

Dinsdale starred opposite Julie Walters in the ITV drama Ahead of the Class and played Robert in Conviction for the BBC (directed by Marc Munden). He starred in two series of The Chase (also for the BBC) and in two thrillers for ITV, Love Lies Bleeding and Midnight Man.

From 2008 to 2010, he played Joe McIntyre, in 157 episodes of the long running soap Coronation Street. Since then, he played leading guest roles in Waterloo Road, Taggart and Moving On. He played Doctor Wengel in Ibsen's The Lady From the Sea at the Royal Exchange Theatre, Manchester. In 2013, Dinsdale played the role of Walter Harrison in James Graham's hit play This House on the Olivier stage at the National Theatre, directed by Jeremy Herrin. In 2014, he appeared in the feature film The Knife That Killed Me and played Alan Bennett in Bennett's autobiographical play Untold Stories at the West Yorkshire Playhouse.

In 2015, Dinsdale played the central role of George Jones in Headlong's national tour of Sir David Hare's play The Absence of War, once again directed by Jeremy Herrin. In October 2015 Dinsdale played the title role in Shakespeare's Richard III at The West Yorkshire Playhouse.

He has an extensive list of BBC Radio Drama credits and, in 2014, he was awarded a Yorkshire Award for Services to Arts and Entertainment. In 2015, he became the first actor to be named Associate Artist at The West Yorkshire Playhouse. In 2017, Dinsdale was made a patron of the Square Chapel Arts Centre in Halifax.

In 2020, Dinsdale joined the ITV soap opera Emmerdale playing the villainous Paul Ashdale. Dinsdale left the soap in 2021 after appearing in 89 episodes when his character was killed off in an explosion.

== Directing ==
In January 2012 Dinsdale directed his first drama for television; a 45-minute single drama called "The Crossing" starring Lee Boardman, Ramona Marquez and Susie Blake, in the Secrets and Words series for BBC One. In 2014 he directed the episode "Madge" starring Hayley Mills, Kenneth Cranham and Peter Egan, in the BBC1 television series Moving On.

He directed the episodes "Scratch" (2015), and "Eighteen" (2016), a story about the attempted deportation of an Afghan youth back to his native Kabul, starring Antonio Aakeel and Rosie Cavaliero, and "Lost" (2017), all for the BBC1 television series Moving On.

He has directed several episodes of Emmerdale, and an episode of Coronation Street.

== Writing ==
In 2009, Dinsdale wrote the short film Imaginary Friend which was subsequently filmed and stars Maxine Peake and Zara Turner. The film premiered on 8 May 2010 at the 360/365 Film Festival in New York City.

== Personal life ==
Dinsdale is a football fan and supports Huddersfield Town A.F.C.

In 2017 he became a patron of the Square Chapel, an arts centre in Halifax. He is also an honorary patron of The Old Courts multi-arts centre in Wigan.

After living in London for 24 years, he married Northern Irish actress Zara Turner and they moved north back to his homeland to raise their children.

== Credits (incomplete) ==
- 1980–1981 Exeter Northcott Theatre / Nottingham Playhouse / Birmingham Repertory Theatre
- 1981 Knife Edge (ITV)
- 1982 The Secret Adversary (ITV)
  Agatha Christie's Partners in Crime (ITV)
  Out on the Floor (BBC)
- 1983 Beethoven's Tenth (Vaudeville Theatre)
- 1983–1984 Red Saturday (Royal Court Theatre)
- 1984 Glamour Night (BBC)
  Minder Series 4, Ep 9, Willesden Suite. (ITV)
  A Private Function (Handmade Films feature film)
  Winter Flight (Channel 4)
  Threads (BBC TV)
- 1985 Bergerac (S4E7 "The Tennis Racket" BBC TV)
  Robin of Sherwood (ITV)
  Home To Roost (ITV)
- 1986 Woundings (Theatre at the Royal Exchange, Manchester)
  The Storyteller (Channel 4)
  Observe the Sons of Ulster Marching Towards the Somme (Hampstead Theatre)
  Home to Roost (series 2) (ITV)
- 1987 Old Years Eve (Royal Shakespeare Company)
  Don Carlos (Theatre at the Royal Exchange, Manchester)
  Coppers (BBC)
  Home to Roost (series 3) (ITV)
- 1988 Rhinoceros (Nuffield Theatre, Southampton)
  Take Me Home (BBC TV)
- 1989 Boys Mean Business (Bush Theatre)
  Home to Roost (series 4) (ITV)
  The Attractions (BBC)
- 1990 Haggard (ITV)
  Wild Oats (West Yorkshire Playhouse)
- 1991 Racing Demon (National Theatre)
  Playboy of the Western World (West Yorkshire Playhouse)
  Young Catherine (American/Canadian TV mini-series)
- 1992 Full Stretch (ITV)
  The Revenger's Tragedy (West Yorkshire Playhouse)
- 1993 A Going Concern (Hampstead Theatre)
  Report Writing (Video Arts Ltd. instructional video)
- 1994 Morning and Evening (Hampstead Theatre)
  Mirandolina (Lyric Hammersmith theatre)
  ID (Parallax Pictures feature film)
- 1995 Bliss (ITV)
  Thief Takers (ITV)
- 1996 Thief Takers (second series) (ITV)
  Hamlet (Fishmonger Films feature film)
  China (Channel 4 short film)
- 1997 Romance and Rejection, Feature Film
- 1998 Love You, Too (Bush Theatre)
- 1999 Family Fortunes (King's Head Theatre)
- 2000 Murder in Mind (BBC TV)
  Visiting Mr. Green (West Yorkshire Playhouse)
- 2001 In Deep (BBC)
- 2002 The Investigation (Canadian TV/BBC)
  Born and Bred (BBC TV)
- 2003 Spooks (BBC TV)
- 2004 Ahead of the Class (ITV)
  The Trouble with George (BBC)
  Conviction (BBC TV)
  Rabbit on the Moon (Headgear Films feature film)
- 2006 Love Lies Bleeding (ITV)
- 2006 Life on Mars (BBC TV)
  Dalziel and Pascoe episode "The Cave Woman" (BBC TV)
  The Chase (BBC TV)
- 2007 The Chase (BBC)
- 2008 Silent Witness (BBC TV)
  Midnight Man (ITV)
- 2008–2010 Coronation Street (ITV)
- 2009 Acid Burn (Red Productions short film)
- 2010 The Lady From The Sea (Theatre at the Royal Exchange, Manchester)
  Taggart (STV / ITV)
- 2011 Waterloo Road (BBC TV)
- 2011 Moving On (LA Productions for BBC1)
- 2013 This House (National Theatre)
- 2014 The Knife That Killed Me (Green Screen Productions feature film)
- 2014 Untold Stories (West Yorkshire Playhouse)
- 2015 The Absence of War (Headlong theatre tour)
- 2015 Richard III (West Yorkshire Playhouse)
- 2017 The Fall of the Master Builder (West Yorkshire Playhouse)
- 2020–2021 Emmerdale (ITV)
