= Haggard (TV series) =

British television series

- Genre: Comedy
- Written by: Eric Chappell
- Starring: Keith Barron; Reece Dinsdale; Sam Kelly; William Simons
- Opening theme: Come, Landlord, Fill the Flowing Bowl (instrumental rendition)
- Ending theme: Come, Landlord, Fill the Flowing Bowl (instrumental rendition)
- Country of origin: United Kingdom
- Original language: English
- No. of series: 2
- No. of episodes: 14

Production
- Executive producer: Vernon Lawrence
- Running time: 30 minutes
- Production company: Yorkshire Television

Original release
- Network: ITV
- Release: 27 January 1990 – 29 August 1992

Haggard is a British TV comedy series, which aired from 27 January 1990 to 29 August 1992. Starring Keith Barron, Reece Dinsdale, Sam Kelly and William Simons.

It was made for the ITV network by Yorkshire Television, and based on Squire Haggard's Journal by Michael Green, more famous for his The Art of Coarse... books.

The series is set during 1777–1778, in the Georgian era, and was about the exploits of Squire Haggard, the Squire's 25-year-old son Roderick, and their servant Grunge.

The show makes use of the production style known as breaking the fourth wall as Fanny Foulacre, Roderick's girlfriend, makes asides to the camera, commenting upon the situations she finds herself in.

== Cast members ==
- Keith Barron — as "Squire Amos Haggard"
- Reece Dinsdale — as his son, "Roderick Haggard"
- Sam Kelly — as their servant, "Nathanial Grunge"
- Sara Crowe — as "Fanny Foulacre" (Series 1)
- Michael Jayston — as "Sir Joshua Foulacre" (Series 1)
- William Simons — as "the Landlord"
- Sarah Badel — as "Lady Tartlet" (Series 1)
- Sue Deveney — as "Betty" (Series 1)
- Paul Chapman — as "Hon. Charles" (Series 2)

== Plot ==
The poverty-stricken Squire Amos Haggard, who is a former friend of the Prince of Wales, is desperate for money and is always plotting for ways in which he can recoup the family fortune.

The Squire's son, Roderick, is idealistic and falls in love very easily. Roderick is more interested in beautiful young ladies than he is in money, and his foolishness often brings his father's schemes undone.

Nathanial Grunge, their servant, is richer than his two masters, and would like to be free of them to pursue his own dreams (something he finds impossible to do because the Squire often uses Grunge's money in his get-rich-quick schemes).

== Home media ==
The complete series was released on DVD by Bfs Entertainment on 15 April 2003.

== Episodes ==
=== Series 1 (1990) ===
No. overall	No. in series	Title	Original release date
1	1	"Haggard at Bay"	27 January 1990
2	2	"Eye of Newt"	3 February 1990
3	3	"Daring Deeds"	10 February 1990
4	4	"The Bellman"	17 February 1990
5	5	"The Great Lover"	24 February 1990
6	6	"Stratagems"	3 March 1990
7	7	"Affair of Honour"	10 March 1990

=== Series 2 (1992) ===
No. overall	No. in series	Title	Original release date
8	1	"The Claimant"	18 July 1992
9	2	"Beau Haggard"	25 July 1992
10	3	"Mad Jack"	1 August 1992
11	4	"Orlando's Revenge"	8 August 1992
12	5	"Just Cause"	15 August 1992
13	6	"Wicked Lady"	22 August 1992
14	7	"Condemned"	29 August 1992
