= Craig Gazey =

British stage and television actor (born 1982)

- Born: 24 February 1982 (age 44); Royton, Greater Manchester, England
- Education: Royal Welsh College of Music & Drama
- Occupation: Actor
- Years active: 1987–present

Craig Gazey (born 24 February 1982) is a British stage and television actor, best known for his portrayal of Graeme Proctor in the ITV soap Coronation Street.

== Early life ==
Gazey attended Our Lady's Roman Catholic High School in Royton, Oldham. His family remain living in the surrounding area. He attended Eggbuckland Community College through until 1998, where he left to attend City College Plymouth, studying BTEC National Diploma in Performing Arts. After this, he went on to study acting at the Royal Welsh College of Music & Drama in Cardiff, which he graduated in 2005.

== Career ==
Gazey made numerous stage appearances before gaining his TV break, notably in the role of Launcelot Gobbo in a Globe Theatre production of The Merchant of Venice in 2007.

Gazey joined the cast of the long-running ITV soap opera Coronation Street in April 2008, portraying the role of Graeme Proctor, a prison cellmate of established character David Platt. Despite only agreeing to a short-term contract, Gazey returned in November 2008, now as a series regular. Gazey went on to appear in the show for three years, and became popular with viewers, winning the "Best Newcomer" and "Best Comedy Performance" honours at the National Television Awards. During his time in the soap, Gazey made appearances on television as a guest on Loose Women and Celebrity Juice. He even appeared in character as Graeme in a special edition of The Jeremy Kyle Show, alongside fellow Coronation Street cast members Jack P. Shepherd, Michelle Keegan and Ben Price.

After leaving Coronation Street, he appeared at the Trafalgar Studios in the West End theatre play, Third Floor in October 2011. In 2012, he toured the United Kingdom in the comedy, Funny Peculiar alongside Suzanne Shaw and former Coronation Street co-star Vicky Entwistle. In 2013, he appeared in a stage version of The Full Monty at Sheffield, followed by a tour and a season in the West End in 2014. In October 2014, Gazey appeared in The Hypochondriac alongside Sir Tony Robinson and Imogen Stubbs at the Theatre Royal Bath, followed by a tour. In 2015, he took part in Celebrity Masterchef for the BBC.

== Filmography ==
Year	Title	Role	Notes
2005	The Bill	Curtis	Guest appearance, one episode
2006	Caerdydd	Pooley	Guest appearance, one episode
2008	Criminal Justice	Flitcroft	4 episodes
2008	Coming Up	Skeebo	Guest appearance, one episode
2008–2011	Coronation Street	Graeme Proctor	Series regular, 260 episodes
2009	The Royal	Bernard Bannister	Guest appearance, one episode
2009	Loose Women	Himself	Individual guest appearances, 4 episodes overall
2010	Loose Women	Himself	Individual guest appearances, 4 episodes overall
2011	Loose Women	Himself	Individual guest appearances, 4 episodes overall
2010	Odd One In	Himself	Guest appearance, one episode
2010	Celebrity Juice	Himself	Individual guest appearances, 4 episodes overall
2011	Celebrity Juice	Himself	Individual guest appearances, 4 episodes overall
2010	The Jeremy Kyle Show	Graeme Proctor	Special episode
2012	Daybreak	Himself	Guest appearance, one episode
2012	The Wright Stuff	Himself	Guest appearance, one episode
2014	Donkeys	Ollie	Short
2015	Celebrity MasterChef	Himself	Contestant, one episode
2016	White Island	Rory	
2016	Topless	Fink	Short
2019	Years and Years	Steven Lyons	Episode 3
2022	Shakespeare & Hathaway: Private Investigators	Jason	one episode
2023	The Bay	Ozzie Peel	multiple episodes
2023	Casualty	Vince Valverde	Series 37 Episode 23
