= The Chase (2006 TV series) =

- Created by: Kay Mellor
- Starring: Gaynor Faye; Nicholas Gleaves
- Country of origin: United Kingdom
- Original language: English
- No. of series: 2
- No. of episodes: 20

Production
- Running time: Approximately 60 minutes
- Production company: Rollem Productions

Original release
- Network: BBC One
- Release: 16 July 2006 – 26 August 2007

The Chase is a British television drama series that aired on BBC One between 16 July 2006 and 26 August 2007. It centred on a family-run veterinary practice.

The show was co-written by Gaynor Faye (credited as Gaynor Mellor), the daughter of the show's creator, Kay Mellor. Much filming for the series was carried out in and around Otley, West Yorkshire; the series is set in the fictional town of "Oxley".

== Cast ==
- Gaynor Faye as Anna Williams - the daughter of the late Imogen and Frank but she was brought up by George and Imogen Williams and sister to Sarah, cousin to Fiona and wife to Tom. Mother to Daisy, Luca, Jake and baby Imogen and a very experienced vet.
- Nicola Stephenson as Sarah Williams - the daughter of the late Imogen and only biological daughter of George Williams and sister to Anna, Sarah moved to London following the death of her mother and the discovery of Tom's affair with Fiona. Having returned to Oxley, Sarah is a competent vet. Sarah marries Adrian and becomes pregnant, but loses the baby. After discovering that her sister and husband discussed her fertility problems behind her back, she sleeps with Sebastian. She later finds out that she is pregnant with his child.
- Nicholas Gleaves as Tom Bedford - husband to Anna and father to Daisy, Luca, Jake, baby Imogen and Theo Jones. He had a one-night stand with Fiona, which resulted in her getting pregnant with Theo.
- Heather Peace as Fiona Jones - single mother to Theo, the result of a drunken one-night stand with Tom. She has her heart set on getting Tom for herself and Theo. Brought up by a single mum, Fiona's like the third sister of the Williams clan and constantly feels like Cinderella. She was the one in the hand-me-down clothes, who trained to be a nurse not a vet, and who couldn't get the man.
- Michelle Holmes as Claudie Williams - widow of George. She was genuinely in love with him but also conscious that he was sitting on a gold mine. She happily encouraged him to re-mortgage the house to fund their lengthy honeymoon stay in Malta.
- Janet Dibley as Deborah Johnson - Rick's domineering wife Deborah is the very bossy Practice Manager of The Chase. An old nag, and snobby too, Deborah doesn't have a nice word to say about anyone or anything. She's always right and happy to let everyone know.
- Reece Dinsdale as Rick Johnson - the hen-pecked husband of Deborah, Rick is a senior partner at The Chase. He is put upon and nagged to death by his wife but he loves his work and is a close associate of the Williams family. The only person who really seems to understand what he goes through is Clare.
- Rachel Davies as Margaret Wright - a Practice Nurse, Margaret's been at The Chase since it was built. Margaret is always there - and always happy to gossip about it. Although undoubtedly good at her job, she's very scatty and liable to become stressed at the drop of a hat.
- Sunetra Sarker as Clare Burnes - Clare is the Practice Nurse at The Chase. Her rip-roaring sense of humour keeps everyone happy, especially Rick.
- Liam Garrigan as Matt Lowe - the most junior Practice Nurse at The Chase, Matt has dreams of leaving it all behind and becoming a rock star. He had a short relationship with Anna.
- Paul Opacic as Adrian Huby - local farmer and Sarah's first love, who marries Sarah in series 2.
- Rebekah Manning as Paula Higgins - Paula is Claudie's younger sister. Claudie set Paula up as a beautician in order to turn her life around. Paula arrives in the village to be with her sister and causes chaos in the practice as half the contents of her salon seem to arrive with her. Blonde and bubbly, she is close to her sister but likes to remain on good terms with everyone.
- Christian Cooke as Liam Higgins - Liam is Claudie and Paula's younger brother. Only 19 and a bit of a rogue, he appears during the series after having been let out of a young offenders institute.
- Philip Jackson as Frank Jones - Fiona's estranged father, Frank returns to Oxley unexpectedly. He doesn't have many friends in the village, as it is common knowledge that he left his wife and young daughter for another woman. Only Fiona knows that the other woman was in fact Anna and Sarah's mother Imogen, who decided to remain with George and the girls at the last minute. He is secretly Anna's father.
- Guy Henry as William Montgomery - the eldest son of the late Lord Montgomery, William has taken his father's title and responsibility of the estate. The Chase's best client, he holds a long-standing respect for George and his two daughters.
- Adam Croasdell as Sebastian Montgomery - William Montgomery's younger brother and old friend of Adrian Huby. Sebastian is good looking and charming, and keen to avoid any of the business of the family estate. Involved in the music business, he is good at making money, and attracting female attention.
- Grace Cassidy as Harriet Johnson - Rick and Deborah's 15-year-old daughter - as in series 2
- Grace Ruiz as Daisy Williams
- Nathan Chaplow as Jake Williams
- Eliot Anthony as Luca Williams
- Charlie Connew as Theo Jones
- Keith Barron as George Williams (Series 1) - George was the father of Anna and Sarah and the head vet of The Chase. His first wife, Imogen, died. Recently, he married Claudie. George was much respected in the local community for always being available to treat farm animals, even on Christmas Day. His principles meant that the practice was somewhat strapped for cash though. Fiona murdered him by cutting the brakes in the Land Rover - however, she had intended to kill Sarah, and was devastated when her "uncle", whom she truly loved, died instead.
- Some notes are taken from here.

== Series 1 (2006) ==
Episode 1 Chevin Chase veterinary practice is buzzing with excitement. The finishing touches are being made to the marquee in the garden with flowers arriving and tables being laid. Eight months pregnant Anna is directing the activity but begins to panic. Time is ticking away and her father George, the groom, is still operating on a puppy. Meanwhile, in London, Sarah walks out on her cheating boyfriend David and drives up north. The church is packed to the rafters. Practice Manager Deborah is making disparaging remarks about everyone to her husband Rick, the practice senior partner. During a brief lull in her tirade, he slips outside for a sneaky cigarette with nurse Matt. Meanwhile, fellow nurses Clare and Margaret enjoy a gossip about the guests and Sarah's imminent arrival. Sarah hasn't been home since her mum died two years ago and everyone wonders why... not least her sister Anna. Little does she know that Sarah hides a painful secret - she caught Anna's husband Tom in bed with one of the nurses, Fiona. And she hasn't been able to face any of them since. Just as Sarah enters the church, Fiona takes her seat. There's no time for trouble as the young bride Claudie, 30 years George's junior, makes her breath-taking entrance. At the wedding reception, chemistry ignites between Rick and Clare who share a brief kiss. Meanwhile, George makes a shocking announcement - he's retiring and moving to Malta with wife Claudie, leaving pregnant Anna and Sarah with a struggling business, one vet down, one vet defecting to the local opposition and a list of operations as long as their arm. George's revelation is enough to send Anna into labour. Anna and Tom race to the hospital, leaving Sarah in charge of the practice and their unruly kids. Anna gives birth to a girl who she names after her mother, Imogen. But George drops another shocking bombshell - they've re-mortgaged the house by £200,000. This leaves Sarah with no option but to muck in at the Chase. After a heated discussion, Fiona and Sarah make amends. Fiona reveals she has a son Theo from a previous failed relationship but little does Sarah know that the child is Tom's. Sarah's astonished when David turns up, begging her to come home, but she reveals she is home. Elsewhere, Tom's late on Theo's monthly payment. Fiona threatens to reveal all if he doesn't cough up soon...

Episode 2 It's Sarah's first day in the practice and just the thought of it is giving her nightmares. During the morning household scrum she puts on her battle armour to face the big day - hair, make-up, suit - looking every inch the professional. But it's a costume hiding her big secret. Practice Manager Deborah isn't very welcoming and her encounter with Sarah leaves feathers severely ruffled. Sarah's first client of the day is a border collie which needs a mammary strip - a straightforward operation but tricky without an ultrasound. Fiona has the dog prepped, but when Sarah realises that the practice doesn't even have an ultrasound she freaks and walks out, heading back to David and London. Unknown to Sarah, her sly ex appears to be entertaining another woman. Anna is furious and bombards Sarah with some hard home truths and accuses her of constantly running away. Anna drops the shocking bombshell that their mother used to run away and cheated on their father, George. Furious and cornered, Sarah finally makes her big confession, "I'm not a vet any more. I gave it up two and a half years ago. I lost my confidence. I lost a dog... the blood kept on coming." Anna is shocked into silence. At the front desk, Deborah's dealing with the angry collie owner. It's Sarah's old flame, local farmer, Adrian Huby. He's delighted to see her again, but Sarah's intent on getting back to London. On the way home, she's haunted by her memories and decides to face her inner demons. Determined to confront the past head on, she returns to the practice to operate on Adrian's collie. It's touch and go for a while but after a tense two-hour operation, the dog pulls through. Eager to make the practice a success, Sarah sells her car to pay for the ultrasound equipment. She also calls David to tell him it's over once and for all. George and Claudie's return stuns Sarah and Anna. It transpires they've been stuck in Liverpool for two days as George's passport was out of date. George confides to Sarah that he's not ready to leave Oxley. Elsewhere, a feline client forces Rick and Clare to take a step closer. Meanwhile, Tom's secret is spiralling out of control as he struggles to meet Fiona's demands. In her stalker style, Fiona confides she wants Tom to be a proper father to Theo, and that their night of passion wasn't a mistake - she chose him.

Episode 3 Still waiting for George's passport to arrive so they can go on honeymoon, Claudie is making her presence felt in the household. Both Anna and Sarah are struggling to keep their feelings towards their stepmother under control. When Claudie starts throwing their mum's belongings out, they are furious. And when George approaches Anna to suggest that she might invite Claudie to be Imogen's godmother, Anna refuses point blank. Sarah has arranged for an ultrasound demonstration and the team gather to see what this new technology can offer. They're all impressed and Sarah offers to pay for one there and then. George's unhappy about the rapid changes taking place in his practice until his daughter's remind him that, technically, he has retired. While everyone has been involved trying out the new equipment, Claudie has been babysitting with disastrous consequences, putting her on a collision course with Anna who is apoplectic with rage. The morning of Imogen's christening dawns with the usual family chaos. When Imogen is sick down her gown, George remembers that Anna's old gown is in a box amongst the things Claudie was clearing out. Dashing upstairs, Anna uncovers more than she bargained for when she opens the box and her birth certificate floats to the floor. She's stunned to discover George is not her father. When confronted, he declares he's always loved Anna like she's his own daughter. Anna demands to know who her real father is but he says that Imogen wouldn't reveal his identity. After a few drinks, Anna and George are reconciled. Fiona confesses to Anna that James isn't Theo's dad, and that she had an affair with a married man who Anna knows. Anna doesn't suspect that man is Tom. Elsewhere, sparks fly between ex-lovers Sarah and Adrian and she agrees to go to dinner with him. Meanwhile, Tom's shocked to learn that Anna knows about Fiona's fling with a married man.

Episode 4 While Anna sleeps peacefully, Tom's helping a cow give birth. After a hard night, he sneaks back at 5am little realising that he's observed by a suspicious Sarah. It's Sunday and George and Claudie are late rising, arriving for their fry-up in matching black silk dressing gowns. Eyebrows are raised. Tom's also receiving mysterious phone calls. Setting off to buy the papers he doesn't come back for almost three hours, meaning Anna has to run the kids' errands. She's worried, suspicious and angry. She tries to call and is shocked when a woman answers but quickly hangs up. Little does she realise that Tom is secretly locuming to fund his payments to an increasingly demanding Fiona. The stress of the secrecy and extreme tiredness is making Tom grouchy. Then his woes are compounded when his father Jim drops by for an unexpected visit. Tom's childhood was not a happy one as his alcoholic father abused him and he's less than overjoyed to see Jim. "You destroyed my childhood" he accuses. Jim is dying and seeks reconciliation but no amount of apologising will sway his son. Things come to a head when Tom gets his operation list confused and mistakenly castrates a prize pedigree stud dog. Its owner is far from happy and demonstrates his rage with his fists. Meanwhile, Jim is forced to stop an angry Tom from attacking Fiona. It transpires that James is also paying a monthly allowance towards Theo's upbringing. Tom demands a paternity test.

Episode 5 Margaret's late again and the staff are beginning to make rumblings against her - namely Deborah and Fiona who suggest that she should reduce her hours. Her suggestion causes ructions at the staff meeting, leaving divisions and suspicion hanging in the air. Tom tackles Fiona about her ulterior motive - trying to grab Margaret's job for herself to bring in more money. George and Claudie are practising their Maltese while they continue to wait for George's passport to arrive. Claudie is increasingly frustrated that they can't start their honeymoon. Matt's getting strange letters from the pensions department. They're writing to his gran about her pension but she died two years ago. Someone has been fraudulently drawing her pension and Matt is falling under suspicion. An investigator's sent to interview him at The Chase but she says payments have been made to an account in Malta. The spotlight falls on Claudie as her past begins to catch up with her. Secrets long hidden burst into the open leaving the family stunned and George broken-hearted. Elsewhere, Sarah has lunch with Adrian and pub grub turns into a picnic full of reminiscences. Meanwhile, Rick and Clare deal with a pair of gay tortoises.

Episode 6 Deborah's in her element as the day of the practice relaunch finally arrives. She's bossing anyone in her eye line - the men delivering chairs, the man delivering plants and any unfortunate stray staff. Clare overhears Rick on the phone. It sounds like a personal call to a lady friend. She's distraught to think that by refusing to let her emotions take control and get involved with him, Rick's now found a new woman in his life. He has - Jane. But it's not what it seems. Jane is a marriage guidance counsellor. Rick has finally had enough and is determined to make Deborah face their problems. Anna suspects that Clare might be the reason for Rick and Deborah's problems. She sets about re-arranging the work schedule so that they work together less, further hurting the bemused Clare who can't work out what she's done wrong. But neither of them can guess the extent of Rick and Deborah's pain and the real reasons they've got into such a mess with each other. Meanwhile, Sarah receives a letter from David that causes great upset. Elsewhere, Margaret rescues the launch from a PR catastrophe. When the new sign is unveiled revealing the practice's new identity, all the staff can see that George's name has finally gone. His daughters have taken full control.

Episode 7 Everyone's had a sleepless night. Sarah's being besieged by her ex-lovers. David's arrived in the middle of the night, drunk from his stag do. Meanwhile, Adrian tries a more mainstream approach. Rick and Clare have had an evening full of declarations of love and the promise of more to come, but Rick is a man of principle. He knows he must discuss things with Deborah before he makes any new commitments in his life. Clare's paranoid and hurt suspecting a one-night stand. Meanwhile, Deborah's shocked when Rick asks for a divorce. Elsewhere, it's Anna's first day back in surgery. Fiona's mum, Shirley, is looking after Imogen and Theo. When Theo falls over and cracks his head, Tom rushes a frantic Fiona to hospital. Tom finally has to face up to his responsibilities to his son and his family.

Episode 8 Following Sarah's discovery that Tom is Theo's father, she's struggling to keep her emotions in check on the day that Anna and Tom renew their vows for their 10th wedding anniversary. She's desperate for Tom to confess to Anna as she can't keep the truth locked up inside any longer. Adrian wisely advises Sarah to keep her counsel. Meanwhile, Fiona faces a furious James, who's still under the illusion that he's Theo's father. Deborah and Rick try to call a truce but their emotions are almost uncontainable. Deborah's heart broken by Rick leaving her and she is suddenly very aware of the threat from Clare. Meanwhile, Matt's been seeing Montgomery's stable girl and things have been getting a bit saucy. But when the mare she's responsible for goes into labour, Montgomery's not pleased to discover that she's been sired by a gypsy pony and Matt is the person who has been taking his stable girl's mind off the job. George and Claudie arrive home with Cindy, Claudie's friend from Malta who has been helping Claudie 'manage' her money. Claudie now has to face up to returning the £10K she fraudulently claimed in pensions. Throughout the day, Tom tries to find a way to talk to Anna but there's never a good moment. Anna arrives for the ceremony looking radiant and happy. Meanwhile, Adrian asks Sarah to marry him and the police turn up wanting to speak to Claudie. When Tom's asked to read the vows she has written for him, he can't and runs off. Eventually, Anna puts two and two together - will she ever forgive him?

== Series 2 (2007) ==
Episode 1 Anna and Sarah mourn the loss of their father, George, at his funeral. Both sisters are infuriated by the arrival of Claudie's sister, Paula, and the contents of her beauty salon. Alienated from the Williams family and no longer working at the practice, Fiona is delighted when her estranged father, Frank, arrives. Rick, meanwhile, is caught snogging Clare by Deborah and thrown out. At the wake, Adrian announces his engagement to Sarah. Meanwhile, Frank drops a bombshell on Fiona - that he had an affair with Imogen, and that Anna is his daughter. The police arrive at the practice and announce that George's death was no accident. They reveal his vehicle's brakes had been tampered with.

Episode 2 Stunned by the discovery that George's death may not have been an accident, the staff face a day of police questioning. As Claudie's sister, Paula sets up her beauty practice in the staff room, there's chaos, resulting in Deborah's shock resignation. Anna and Sarah are horrified to discover George made no will since marrying Claudie. Consequently, they face losing everything to her. When William steps in with an offer of financial assistance, Claudie refuses to budge from the house. With morale at an all-time low, everyone looks forward to the Montgomery Estate ball where they can only hope for a fairy tale ending. Instead it's a night of surprises. Sarah confesses to Adrian that she's pregnant; Anna snogs Matt, Paula kisses Sebastian, Clare and Rick spend the night together and Claudie's brother, Liam, arrives unexpectedly.

Episode 3 It's the morning after the night before and there are some monster hangovers from the ball. However, Anna's nowhere to be found, leaving Claudie to look after the kids. At the practice, business is in total chaos with Deborah gone, and Paula's beauty parlour taking over. Rick and Clare are loved up after spending their first night together. Worried over his wife's whereabouts, Tom takes matters into his own hands, unleashing Anna's indignation at his assumed position in her life. Sparks fly, and Anna's response to Tom's infidelity with Fiona is finally made clear when she asks him for a divorce. Anna finds comfort in the arms of Matt.

Episode 4 As Clare's frustration with Rick's family life grows, her insecurities about their new relationship deepen. Meanwhile, Rick's daughter, Harriet, discovers the affair between her father and Clare and runs away. Deborah returns and enforces a tough new regime including pedometers and mission statements. Matt saves the day for Anna as he covertly stops Claudie making more changes to the house. Claudie and Paula are busy organising a surprise hen night for Sarah. But the good night they planned is tainted as the pressure finally becomes too much for Rick and he snaps. He lashes out at Clare and accuses her of being a tart. Matt's band go down a storm at the local pub whose new landlord is Fiona's dad, Frank. Meanwhile, Tom tries to make amends with Anna but becomes suspicious of her relationship with Matt.

Episode 5 Rick tries to make amends with Clare and she agrees to give him another chance. Tom tries to change Anna's mind about the divorce and his suggestion of counselling goes down very badly. Sarah's future hangs in the balance when she collapses with abdominal pains. Meanwhile, Tom's forced to step at the practice. Sarah's crushed when she loses the baby and discovers she may never conceive again. Anna, meanwhile, persuades family man Adrian that Sarah's worth it and suggests surrogacy. Desperate to show how much Sarah means to him, Adrian stages their wedding ceremony at the hospital. Frank hosts the reception at his pub. During a slow dance with Sebastian, Sarah discovers he has a soft spot for her. Fiona arrives and has a furious outburst. She feels betrayed, believing that Frank's put Sarah first. Sebastian reminds Anna of the surrogacy offer she made Adrian. She makes it clear she was talking hypothetically but Sebastian believes it was her suggestion which changed Adrian's mind. Sebastian urges her to tell Sarah the truth. Sarah and Anna are horrified to learn that Claudie's benefited from George's death after the insurance money comes through. Fiona confides in Frank that she hates Sarah. He implores her to put the past behind her and move on, but she coldly declares she knows exactly what needs to be done.

Episode 6 – Claudie and Liam are questioned by the police in relation to George's death. Sarah has always been adamant that Fiona is to blame. Fiona's overjoyed when she's accepted by Liverpool University to study veterinary medicine. However, she needs to provide a reference to prove her experience as a nurse and approaches Anna. However, Anna refuses to help after Sarah sticks her oar in. Fiona goes to desperate lengths to try to change Anna's mind. When her son's pet rabbit is taken ill, she rushes to The Chase and uses the opportunity to tackle her again but Anna stands firm against her. Fiona, meanwhile, disturbs Tom and Anna when she picks up their son from school without their consent or knowledge. Sarah and Anna discover that the rabbit was given a salt overdose deliberately and worry about Fiona's state of mind. Fiona demands that Sarah meet up with her that evening to give her a reference. Fearing for her life, Sarah carries a gun for protection and meets Fiona. Hiding behind a rock, Fiona hits Sarah over the head and runs off.

Episode 7 Matt has high hopes as his band compete in the local Battle of the Bands competition. The night brings both surprises and disappointment as Matt is offered a fantastic opportunity by Sebastian, but misses out on an evening with Anna. Still reeling from Fiona's confession, Tom tries to gain Anna's attention, but she's distracted by the thought of losing the one new and exciting part of her life. Anna and Matt are both forced to consider their relationship and as they pull in different directions, sparks fly. But they soon become more entangled than ever.

Episode 8 It's the day of Claudie's court hearing and she's keen to keep it a secret from Anna and Sarah. Realising how close she is at being sent to jail, Claudie panics. Sarah's riddled with guilt after her night of betrayal with her husband's best friend, Sebastian. Meanwhile, Anna's smitten by new lover, Matt. A quick earner for Liam has dangerous and expensive ramifications. The local zoo call with an injured lion cub which has dislocated its shoulder. Armed with a dart gun, Tom dashes off to fulfil a lifetime dream of working with big game animals. Everyone's agog to see a lion at The Chase. As Tom treats the animal with Anna in attendance, it reawakens their old dream of a life in Africa.

Episode 9 Deborah's moonlighting for William and has become virtually indispensable to him, organising everything from his mother's birthday present to the weekend's hunt. Rumours start to circulate that William's going to poach her full-time, enraging Sarah who remembers only too well the chaos when Deborah last resigned. Sarah's bad humour isn't just sparked by professional reasons as she's hiding a much more personal secret. Meanwhile, Deborah's basking in William's attention and secretly dreams that his feelings for her might lead to an altogether different proposal. Tom's plans to move to Botswana have progressed. Rick reaches a crisis in his relationship with Clare. She's finally cracking under his possessive, overbearing behaviour and there's only one way he can win her back.

Episode 10 Claudie insists on a mediation session to finalise the arrangements over George's estate. The bad tempered discussion ends with a shock revelation which leaves Anna wondering what she's been working so hard for over the last ten years. Rick hits the bottle after Clare fails to give him an answer to his proposal. With mounting financial pressures as well, he's in no mood to deal with an onslaught from Deborah. Tempers become heated when Deborah fires Clare. Rick's devastated to witness Clare being greeted at home by a mystery man. He assumes the worst, until Clare takes the plunge and finally reveals the dramatic truth as to why she can't answer his proposal.

Episode 11 Tom's struggling to cope with Fiona. She continues scheming in order to turn her dreams of a life with him into reality. He's desperate to find a way out of her plans, but fears the ramifications of betraying their secret. Can he keep her at bay for just a few more weeks? Anna's busy building her dream of a family life with Tom. She's mystified as to why Tom insists on keeping their Botswana plans a secret and is insistent on telling everyone about their departure. Frank suspects Tom's not playing fair with Fiona, but little could he foresee the shocking revelation he forces Tom to make. Despite his best intentions, Tom's secrets can't be kept quiet as he attempts to juggle the two women in his life. The path of love for Rick and Clare is proving a tough challenge. Despite resolving some issues, there are still some hurdles to surmount as they try to plan life ahead together.

Episode 12 With Fiona taken in for police questioning over George's death, Anna's uncertain whether or not her and Tom's plans for Botswana should still stand, but Tom persuades her to leave as soon as possible. In her haste, Anna has little time to contemplate the shocking revelation that she's Frank's daughter. Meanwhile, Frank reveals the truth behind his affair with her mother Imogen and that they were madly in love. It transpires Frank and Imogen had arranged to run off together but she chickened out. 16 years later, Imogen turned up out of the blue and revealed she was dying and that if anything happened to Anna, that Frank should look after her. Franks declares he came back to look after Anna following George's death. Sarah faces a challenge to keep the practice going in the absence of Anna and Tom, and Claudie thinks she has the answer. However, Sarah has other things on her mind when she discovers she's pregnant. She confides in Anna that she believes the father's Sebastian. Anna talks her into keeping the baby. Tom's plans are halted as the police discover a pair of wire cutters believed to be connected to George's death. Tom declares that he believes Fiona's been trying to stitch him up. When he explains she killed George, the cops query why he didn't come forward sooner. With not enough evidence to charge him, Tom's released. When Fiona discovers Tom's real intentions, she storms to The Chase to confront Anna. A huge row ensues with Sarah and Anna caught up in Fiona's rage. Fiona holds a knife to Sarah's throat but the victim of her anger is someone she never intended to hurt. In a blind fury, after Tom said, "I wish to god that Theo never existed," she fatally stabs Tom and he collapses in Anna's arms, telling her that he loved her. Fiona was arrested just before the end.

The show returned for a second series on 3 June 2007, and took place just days after Anna discovered her husband Tom's affair. The second series was 12 episodes long, a 50% increase from the first series. On 11 July 2007, it was announced that the show would be axed alongside New Street Law.

== DVD release ==
Series 1 is available on DVD on two discs. Series 2 was released on 29 October 2007 by Acorn Media UK on three discs.

== International broadcasters ==
- Australia: The Chase aired on Channel Seven on Saturday nights at 9.30pm, over the non-ratings period in 2007.
- Netherlands: The Chase aired on Nederland 2 on Friday nights at 7.25pm, from 27 July 2007
- Thailand: The Chase aired on BBC Entertainment on Sunday nights at 7.30pm.
- South Korea: The Chase aired on BBC Entertainment daily at around 2.15pm. Series final on 9 September 2009.
- New Zealand: The Chase aired on TV One (New Zealand) daily at 4:25.
