= Christine Appleby =

Fictional character from Coronation Street

- Coronation Street character
- Portrayed by: Christine Hargreaves
- Duration: 1960–1963
- First appearance: Episode 2; 14 December 1960
- Last appearance: Episode 267; 3 July 1963
- Created by: Tony Warren
- Introduced by: Stuart Latham (1960); H.V. Kershaw (1962)
- Book appearances: Coronation Street: The Complete Saga
In-universe information
- Occupation: Machinist
- Father: George Hardman
- Mother: May Hardman
- Husband: Colin Appleby (1962)
- Grandfathers: Frank Mason
- Uncles: Edwin Mason
- Aunts: Netta Mason; Madge Mason; Ada
- First cousins: Reggie Mason; Joan

Christine Appleby (also Hardman) is a fictional character from the British ITV soap opera Coronation Street. She was portrayed by Christine Hargreaves between 1960 and 1963.

== Casting ==
Christine Hargreaves, a 21-year-old Salford-born actress, was one of the first actors to read for Tony Warren's new script 'Florizel Street' (later renamed to Coronation Street). Hargreaves played the character in the dry runs, before the show was even commissioned for broadcast, alongside Pat Phoenix (Elsie Tanner) and Doris Speed (Annie Walker), among others.

== Storylines ==
=== Backstory ===
Christine Hardman was born on No. 13 Coronation Street, Weatherfield in 1939. Growing up, she attended Bessie Street School, where she was close friends with Ken Barlow (William Roache). Her father, George Hardman, was originally a bank clerk; however, by 1953, he saved up enough money and bought a grocery shop as well as a detached house in Oakhill.

The family lived together at this location until 1955, when George Hardman died from a heart attack. After this, Christine and her mother, May (Joan Heath), were forced to sell both the house and the grocery shop and move back into their former home on Coronation Street.

The death of her husband and the return to her previous neighbourhood was traumatic for May Hardman, and Christine was forced to spend the next several years caring for her emotionally scarred mother.

=== During the series (1960–1963) ===
Starting in 1960, Christine begins working as a machinist at Elliston's Raincoat Factory. That same year, May passes away from a brain tumour, leaving Christine to manage the house and her finances on her own. She is often helped by her generous neighbours, especially Esther Hayes (Daphne Oxenford).

One of these neighbours is the plumber Joe Makinson (Brian Rawlinson), who does her plumbing for free and asks her out on a date. Christine, though worried that he might be taking advantage of her, agrees to go, and a relationship soon develops between them. Joe proposes after a short time; however, Christine breaks up with him, as she does not think that they are compatible.

In 1961, Christine unexpectedly bumps into Ken at the Weatherfield Train Station. He intends to move to London to get away from the expectations of his family following the death of his mother, Ida Barlow (Noel Dyson), but is convinced to stay by Christine.

Despite having taken control of her life and coping with everything, Christine is unhappy with the repetitive and dull work at Elliston's. In 1962, she begins wondering how people could find happiness living on Coronation Street. That June, she climbs onto the roof of the factory, intending to jump off, but she is talked down by Ken, who reminds her how she had stopped him from making a big mistake. He sympathizes with Christine's desire for better things in life but tells her that she should not give up. After the rooftop incident, Christine quits her job at the factory and tries to live life differently. An old flame of hers, Colin Appleby (Lawrence James), meets up with her, having read about her recent incident in the newspaper. She seizes the opportunity and decides to move out of Weatherfield once the relationship starts to get serious. The couple settles in Leeds and elopes two weeks later. However, Colin is killed in a car crash that October. Christine returns to Coronation Street and takes a job at Miami Modes with Elsie Tanner (Pat Phoenix) and Dot Greenhalgh (Joan Francis).

In 1963, Christine shocks residents when she goes out with Ken's father, Frank Barlow (Frank Pemberton), because Frank is twice her age and she had previously been interested in Ken. Though still confused about what she wants now that Colin is dead, she goes along with the relationship; meanwhile, Frank is enthusiastic about their relationship and already thinking about marriage, which almost alienates him from his son. The news sends neighbourhood gossip into overdrive, and Elsie decides to spread the rumour that Christine has another boyfriend so that she and Frank will have peace. Frank proposes, but Christine does not answer him right away. Before she decides, she meets up with Joe Makinson again and cannot decide whom to choose. Ultimately, she plans to reject Joe, but he breaks up with her first, leading her to accept Frank's proposal. The gossip becomes so intense that Christine writes a letter to the landlord of No. 11 Coronation Street, where she lives with Elsie, informing him that Elsie is living there illegally. This results in her having to move out. Christine soon realises that she does not love Frank and only saw him as a possible means to leave the street for good. She decides to be honest with him and calls off their engagement.

In June 1963, Christine is promoted at Miami Modes. She clashes with Elsie and Dot, who do not like the way she uses her newfound authority. She is transferred, and after briefly sharing a flat with her old friend, Esther Hayes, she leaves Weatherfield for good in July 1963.

Christine sends a telegram to congratulate Elsie and Steve Tanner (Paul Maxwell) on their wedding day in 1967. In 1971, Esther reveals that Christine is living in Southampton. In 1973, Lucille Hewitt (Jennifer Moss) mentions that Christine has since remarried and had children.
