= Concepta Riley =

Fictional character from Coronation Street

- Coronation Street character
- Portrayed by: Doreen Keogh
- Duration: 1960–1964, 1967, 1972, 1975
- First appearance: 23 December 1960; Episode 5
- Last appearance: 31 December 1975; Episode 1561
- Created by: Tony Warren
- Introduced by: Tony Warren (1960); Jack Rosenthal (1967); H.V. Kershaw (1972); Susi Hush (1975)
- Book appearances: Coronation Street: The Complete Saga
In-universe information
- Other names: Concepta Hewitt; Concepta Regan
- Occupation: Barmaid
- Father: Sean Riley
- Mother: Shelagh Riley
- Husband: Harry Hewitt (1961–1967); Sean Regan (1972–present)
- Sons: Christopher Hewitt
- Stepdaughters: Lucille Hewitt

Concepta Riley (also Hewitt and Regan) is a fictional character from the British ITV soap opera Coronation Street, played by Doreen Keogh. Concepta was created by Tony Warren as one of Coronation Street's original characters. She debuted in the soap opera's fifth episode which was broadcast on 23 December 1960.

Concepta is recognised as the first ever barmaid of the Rovers Return Inn, an occupation which over time became an important role in the show. Her stories include her marriage to Harry Hewitt (Ivan Beavis) and becoming step-mother to his rebellious daughter Lucille (Jennifer Moss). She also gives birth to son, Christopher (Victoria Baker), and writers devised an abduction story for him. It became one of Concepta's most notable storylines and helped raise Coronation Street's viewership to 21 million, which at the time was their highest audience share.

When Tim Aspinall took over as the producer of Coronation Street, he decided to write Concepta and Harry out of the series. They left to begin a new life in Ireland, but left Lucille behind. Both Keogh and Beavis agreed to reprise their roles in 1967, but Harry was killed off when he is crushed by a van. After a five-year hiatus, Keogh reprised the role in 1972 and 1975. She then married Sean Regan (Tony Doyle) and her return stories focused on Sean kissing Bet Lynch (Julie Goodyear) and Concepta accepting his infidelity. At her final appearance, Keogh appeared in a total of 320 episodes of Coronation Street.

== Creation ==
Concepta is one of Coronation Street's original characters. She was created by Tony Warren, who also created the show itself. The character's inclusion partly originated from requests made by television executive Denis Forman, who worked at Granada Television. He was concerned that the Manchester based soap opera would feature too many Mancunian based accents. He wanted either a Cockney or Irish accent to serve as relief from the Northern slang. Warren was already in the process of creating Concepta and she served Forman's request well. Actress Doreen Keogh successfully auditioned for the role after pursuing a long theatre career. Despite being created as one of the show's original characters, Concepta did not appear until the soap opera's fifth episode.

== Development ==
=== Career and family ===
Concepta is portrayed as a "chirpy" character who works at the local pub the Rovers Return Inn. In her back story, Concepta was born in Dublin and came to Weatherfield to work at the pub, moving into the spare room. In the book 50 Years of Coronation Street, author Tim Randall describes Concepta as a "sweet-natured" barmaid. She is a devout Irish Catholic and she wants her children to be brought up following the same religion. Writers quickly established Concepta as the best friend and confidante of pub landlady Annie Walker (Doris Speed). There alongside Annie and her husband Jack Walker (Arthur Leslie), Concepta would be featured in scenes. One such scene, recorded at a time Coronation Street was filmed and broadcast live in the United Kingdom nearly went wrong but was saved due to Keogh's acting skill. When Jack directs Concepta into the Rovers Return to speak with Annie, Keogh proceeded to try the front door which was locked by mistake. Keogh improvised and changed the lines, and joked that Jack locked himself out and proceeded to try and enter via the back of the pub. The director of the episode was so impressed with Keogh saving the broadcast that he hugged her once the cameras were turned off.

The character has a place in the show's history as the first ever Rovers Return barmaid featured on the show. The barmaid role became so iconic that by the time of Keogh's death in 2017, she was still remembered well as the original.

Producers paired Concepta with Harry Hewitt (Ivan Beavis), a bus inspector and widower. Harry soon proposes to Concepta and they marry within a month. They were the second set of characters to marry on-screen in the show's history. The wedding took place on 1 October 1961. Concepta moves in with Harry and his daughter Lucille Hewitt (Jennifer Moss) at number seven Coronation Street. Lucille liked Concepta because she believed that her father would be happy once again having a wife. In 1962, writers came up with a dog racing storyline for the Hewitt's when they purchase a greyhound and enter it into a race, which it wins. This prompts Concepta's neighbours to believe that they can make money off the dog. Elsie Tanner (Pat Phoenix) even bets her entire holiday fund on the race, which it loses forcing the Hewitts to retire from dog racing.

Producers soon set about expanding the Hewitt family, with the birth of Concepta and Harry's son Christopher Hewitt (Victoria Baker). Lucille finds it difficult to adjust to having a brother and is jealous that he gets more attention. To mark the first anniversary of the Hewitt's wedding, producers lined up a story in which Christopher is abducted. When Lucille is running errands for Annie, someone snatches Christopher from outside Gamma Garments. The police are called and Concepta goes missing in the search for him. Florrie Lindley (Betty Alberge) soon finds Concepta wandering the streets crying in her search for Christopher. The search focuses on the Hewitts and the local canal is drained. Lucille is questioned as people think that she has harmed her brother out of jealousy. Elsie manages to track Christopher down to the home of Joan Akers (Anna Cropper), who has taken him because she is unstable following the death of her own child. The story was a success for the show because it gained the highest ratings to that date, with 21 million people watching. The Hewitt's carried on in the show having to put up with Lucille's dramas as she rebelled.

=== Departure and returns ===
In June 1963, Concepta's father Sean Riley (Harold Goldblatt) is taken ill in Ireland. Concepta convinces to Harry to quit his job at the bus station and move away to look after Sean. Harry changes his mind before they leave because he cannot bear to leave Lucille behind. When Tim Aspinall took over as the producer of Coronation Street, he began writing out several characters to rejuvenate the series. This era of the show became known as "the bloody purge of 1964", in which he infamously killed off Martha Longhurst (Lynne Carol). Concepta and Harry were two other characters that Aspinall decided to write out of the show. Writers revisited the earlier story of Concepta and Harry moving to Ireland. This time, Harry plans to open a garage in Castleblayney, leaving Lucille behind living on Coronation Street in the care of Annie and Jack. Their departures aired in August 1964.

In September 1967, Keogh and Beavis both reprised their roles as Concepta and Harry. Keogh was asked first and informed that it would be a two-week guest role. Beavis was shocked to learn Harry's return would be subject to a story in which he would be killed off. Beavis claimed that he told Keogh of his shock stating "bloody hell, they're going to kill me off and you're staying for the funeral." On-screen they arrive to attend Elsie and Steve Tanner's (Paul Maxwell) wedding. Harry's death occurs while repairing Len Fairclough's (Peter Adamson) van. A jack gives way and the van collapses on top of him which kills him. In their final scene together Concepta arrives to identify his body. Filming Harry's final scenes were eventful as when a stunt man refused to act the scene. The car later collapsed for real onto a stunt dummy.

Viewers could not understand why they brought Harry and Concepta back for the story. Moss, who played Lucille was not happy with the decision. She told author Daran Little that "to bring him back and finish him off was just a reminder of what had gone on in 1964."

Keogh agreed to return to the series twice during the 1970s. A return happened during October 1972 episodes, which feature Concepta visiting Lucille. She announces that she plans to remarry after becoming engaged to Sean Regan (Tony Doyle). Her final return to the show occurred during November 1975. Concepta and Sean arrive to visit Lucille, but Sean's behaviour causes concern. He visits the Rovers Return and kisses Bet Lynch (Julie Goodyear), who then slaps him across the face. She then threatens to tell Concepta that Sean is promiscuous. In her final scenes, Conecpta confides in Annie that she is aware Sean has been unfaithful, but stays with him because she loves him. Keogh appeared as Concepta in a total of 320 episodes of Coronation Street.

== Reception ==
In 2018, Rebecca Day from the Manchester Evening News said that Christopher's abduction was one of Concepta's "biggest stories". A reporter from The Daily Telegraph named it as one of the show's "most dramatic" stories and branded Concepta "an excitable Irishwoman". Cillian O'Brien from Dublin Live stated that Keogh is "known as the first barmaid to ever pull a pint in Coronation Street." Michael Quinn from The Stage said "as Concepta Riley, the first barmaid to appear behind the bar of the Rovers Return in Coronation Street, Doreen Keogh created the template for a role that would become central to life on the fabled cobbled streets of Weatherfield." Inside Soap ran a feature compiling "The 100 greatest soap stories ever told". They featured Christopher's kidnapping story as their 59th choice.
