= List of Coronation Street characters introduced in 1973 =

Coronation Street is a British television soap opera first broadcast on 9 December 1960. The following is a list of characters that appeared in 1973, by order of first appearance. All characters were introduced by then series producer H. V. Kershaw. May saw the first appearance of Faye-Marie Schofield. Elaine Perkins was introduced in July. Two months later, Vera Hopkins and Tricia Hopkins arrived. While Polly Ogden made her debut in December.

== Armistead Caldwell ==
Armistead Caldwell
- Coronation Street character
- Portrayed by: David Casey
- Appears on: 29 January 1973
- Introduced by: H. V. Kershaw
In-universe information
- Occupation: Railway foreman
- Wife: Minnie Carlton (1925–1935)

Armistead Caldwell is the late husband of Minnie Caldwell (Margot Bryant). He "appears" only in a voice appearance, in which he is portrayed by David Casey.

A soft and gentle man, Armistead and Minnie were deeply in love throughout their brief marriage. However, this was not always the case; in 1919, during a trip to Marple Lake, Minnie left Armistead behind to walk, and he turned to Ena Sharples (Violet Carson) to advice. He fell for Ena, mainly attracted by her upfront plain speaking, a quality that Minnie did not have. He even went as far to write Ena a love letter, but Ena told Armistead to go back to Minnie, as they were meant to be. He obeyed, and Armistead married Minnie in 1925, dying ten years later.

However, in 1973, Minnie was most upset when she found said letter while cleaning Ena's flat, in preparation for Ena returning from holiday. Minnie is subsequently cold with Ena, snubbing her twice in the Rovers Return Inn. Concerned, Ena asks Lucille Hewitt (Jennifer Moss), Bet Lynch (Julie Goodyear), Rita Littlewood (Barbara Mullaney) and Norma Ford (Diana Davies) how Minnie has been behaving recently, but gets no solid response. Minnie refuses to tell Ena, her biggest hint being asking Ena if she has done anything to stop herself going to Heaven.

After concerned neighbour Emily Bishop (Eileen Derbyshire) enquired about Minnie's despondence, Minnie showed Emily the letter and broke down in tears, under the impression that Armistead and Ena had had an affair. Emily persuades Ena and Minnie to talk, and Ena assures her friend that she was little more than a shoulder to cry on. Minnie accepts this and agrees to put their differences aside. However, once they have left Minnie's house, Ena confides to Emily that Armistead's intentions were far more serious than she had let on; Emily agrees to keep quiet, and Minnie never finds out.

== Faye-Marie Schofield ==
Faye-Marie Schofield
- Coronation Street character
- Portrayed by: Jane Casson
- First appearance: 14 May 1973
- Last appearance: 30 May 1973
- Introduced by: H. V. Kershaw
In-universe information
- Occupation: Teacher
- Husband: Tom Scofield

Faye-Marie Schofield, played by Jane Casson, made her first screen appearance on 14 May 1973. Faye-Marie is the wife of Tom Scofield, a nephew of Ena Sharples. She visits Weatherfield along with her husband to inform Ena that her brother, Tom's father, had recently died in his sleep. They then accompany some residents of Coronation Street to Woburn Abbey, much to Ena's delight.

== Elaine Perkins ==
Elaine Perkins
- Coronation Street character
- Portrayed by: Joanna Lumley
- First appearance: 23 July 1973
- Last appearance: 15 August 1973
- Introduced by: H. V. Kershaw
In-universe information
- Father: Wilfred Perkins

Elaine Perkins, played by Joanna Lumley, made her first screen appearance on 23 July 1973. Lumley was contracted to appear for eight episodes as a love interest for Ken Barlow (William Roache). She had hoped the role would lead to a longer stint, but producers had other plans for Ken. In 2009, Lumley almost reprised the role as part of a storyline that saw Ken have an affair. However, she was too busy filming on another project at the time and Stephanie Beacham was cast as Ken's lover Martha Fraser instead.

Elaine meets Ken Barlow at a party for the teaching staff of Bessie Street School. Her father, Wilfred Perkins (Wensley Pithey), introduces them to each other and they bond over their political views, despite the age gap. Elaine and Ken meet up several times as friends, but Ken soon develops feelings for her and becomes jealous of her friendships with other men. Ken tells Elaine that he is in love with her and asks her to marry him, but she turns down his proposal.

A writer for What's on TV branded Elaine a "posh girl".

== Tricia Hopkins ==
Tricia Hopkins
- Coronation Street character
- Portrayed by: Kathy Jones
- Duration: 1973–1976
- First appearance: 24 September 1973
- Last appearance: 9 June 1976
- Introduced by: H. V. Kershaw
In-universe information
- Occupation: Shop worker
- Father: Idris Hopkins
- Mother: Vera Hopkins
- Grandfathers: Cledwin Hopkins
- Grandmothers: Megan Hopkins

Patricia "Tricia" Hopkins, played by Kathy Jones, made her first screen appearance on 24 September 1973. Patricia is the daughter of Idris and Vera Hopkins (Kathy Staff) and the granddaughter of Cledwin and Megan Hopkins. She first appeared in September 1973 when she was being chatted up by Ray Langton (Neville Buswell) and was eventually caught by Vera drinking in The Rovers Return.

Tricia appeared in Coronation Street again in 1974, when her grandmother Megan Hopkins viewed the Corner Shop with an interest in buying it. Tricia got a job in the Mark Brittain Warehouse across the Street and lived in the Corner Shop flat, while her Granny ran the shop with Vera and Idris, and lived in the shop accommodation below the flat. Tricia's first few months in the Street were spent trying to get Ray to notice her. Her friend Gail Potter (Helen Worth) was keen to match-make the pair, and took a polaroid just as Ray kissed Tricia. The picture was found by Granny Hopkins, who locked Tricia in her room and subjected her to a moral preaching. Idris warned Ray away from Tricia, but Ray told him there was not any relationship to speak of, except Tricia's wishful thinking.

Her main priority being to enjoy her youth, Tricia did not concern herself with her family's problems, and bemoaned the fact that despite having her own flat, she was still under their thumb. When the rest of the family left the Street after a failed attempt to blackmail shop owner Gordon Clegg (Bill Kenwright), Tricia returned to Coronation Street and convinced Gordon to rent the flat to her and Gail, with Blanche Hunt (Maggie Jones) taking over the running of the shop.

Tricia fancied herself as a man-eater, but was not interested in anything serious. She was sometimes cheeky to the older residents of the Street, who saw her as opinionated, with an especially high opinion of herself.

In 1975, when a cigarette caused the warehouse to burn down, Tricia was trapped in a toilet and rescued by Ken Barlow (William Roache). She and Gail were able to convince the Langtons to let them stay with them until the street residents were allowed to return to their homes. While jobless, the pair joined a modelling course, and became agents for the Weatherfield Heating Bureau before settling into work in the Shop.

Tricia had some high ambitions - she played Cinderella in the street's play in the Community Centre and her performance was praised in the local newspaper, although nothing came of it.

When Elsie Tanner (Pat Phoenix) returned to the Street to manage Sylvia's Separates, Tricia and Gail both asked her for the assistant's job. Elsie took on Tricia, but she and Gail decided to toss a coin to decide, and Gail won, leaving Tricia in the Corner Shop, but only a short time later Renee Bradshaw (Madge Hindle) bought the Shop from Gordon and Tricia lost her job. She was willing to let Tricia stay on in the flat, but Tricia was sick of Renee already and told her she could stick her job and her flat, and returned to her family.

In 2019, 43 years later Gail later visited her after leaving Thailand before going back home.

== Vera Hopkins ==
Vera Hopkins
- Coronation Street character
- Portrayed by: Kathy Staff
- Duration: 1973–1975
- First appearance: 26 September 1973
- Last appearance: 10 February 1975
- Introduced by: H. V. Kershaw
In-universe information
- Husband: Idris Hopkins
- Daughters: Tricia Hopkins

Vera Hopkins, played by Kathy Staff, made her first screen appearance on 26 September 1973. Vera is the mother of Tricia Hopkins (Kathy Jones). Vera had married into the Welsh Hopkins family. The Hopkinses were close, with Vera and her husband Idris keeping a close eye on Tricia and Idris's mother Megan keeping an even closer eye on them.

In 1973, Vera caught Tricia drinking underage in The Rovers Return, and rowed with landlady Annie Walker for allowing it. Annie gave Vera a dressing down for not knowing what her daughter got up to, and barred the Hopkinses from the pub.

The Hopkinses returned to Coronation Street in 1974 with an interest in buying the Corner Shop. Vera did not stay long though as only a few weeks later she left to take care of her sick mother, only returning when she died a few months later. Granny Hopkins was interested in buying the shop using Vera's inheritance, but the pair did not get along and when the pair were moving furniture in the corner shop accommodation and found owner Gordon Clegg's (Bill Kenwright) birth certificate, Vera assured Betty Turpin (Betty Driver) that they would not tell anyone that it revealed that she was Gordon's true mother, not Maggie Cooke (Irene Sutcliffe). Vera knew that Granny could not be trusted, and tried to rein her in as she used the information to try to secure a lower price on the shop from seller Gordon. Vera and Idris excluded her from the acquisition of the shop, keen to make peace with the Cleggs, but Granny sent Gordon a letter telling him the truth anyway, causing him to change his mind about the sale. The Hopkinses promptly left the Street, with Vera and Idris too ashamed to return, and Granny too defiant.

== Polly Ogden ==
Polly Ogden
- Coronation Street character
- Portrayed by: Mary Tamm
- First appearance: 17 December 1973
- Last appearance: 19 December 1973
- Introduced by: H. V. Kershaw
In-universe information
- Occupation: Nurse
- Husband: Trevor Ogden (1971–?)
- Sons: Damian Ogden
- Daughters: Jayne Ogden

Pauline "Polly" Ogden (also Watson), played by Mary Tamm, made her first screen appearance on 17 December 1973. Polly is the wife of Trevor Ogden (Don Hawkins) and the mother of Damian (Neil Ratcliffe) and Jayne Ogden. Polly met Trevor when he had a cyst operation carried out in a hospital where Polly worked as a nurse. Since leaving Weatherfield aged fifteen in 1964, Trevor had worked his way into the building trade and cut virtually all ties with his northern roots; when he married Polly in 1971, he told her his parents were dead, although he did write a letter to Stan (Bernard Youens) and Hilda (Jean Alexander) that year before marrying, which he thought they'd ignored as he never received the reply they sent. In 1973, Polly gave birth to a son, Damian.

Later, just before Christmas, Polly answered the door to Stan and Hilda, who had tracked Trevor down to Chesterfield as they wanted in the year to reconnect with him after nine years. The initial exchanges were awkward as the elder Ogdens did not know that Trevor had married or that they were grandparents, while Polly was interested in why Trevor had written them off but did not want Stan and Hilda to know he had. When Trevor arrived home, he was not happy to see his parents but he was polite with them, although he was visibly embarrassed at the reminder of the working class community he'd abandoned. When alone with Polly, Trevor was more vocal, warning her that if they let Stan and Hilda into their lives they'd never be rid of them. Polly admitted that she did not like them much either but that she wanted to invite them to stay the night as it was getting late, but Trevor was against this and rushed them out of the house before their dinner guests arrived. There was friction between father and son as Stan was very aware that Trevor was only tolerating them, and Trevor blamed Stan for his failings as a child. This was exacerbated when Polly let slip that she'd been told Hilda and Stan were dead, and they left shortly thereafter.

Polly never visited Stan and Hilda in Weatherfield but Trevor paid occasional visits, usually when he wanted something. In December 1975, while pregnant with their second child, Polly was admitted to hospital for toxaemia. Trevor asked Hilda to live in his house in Chesterfield and look after Damian for a month as he was working. Hilda was hurt that Trevor had broken his silence to ask her to skivvy for him but went to Chesterfield anyway. In January 1976, Polly gave birth to a daughter, Jayne. When Stan died in 1984, Polly, unlike Trevor, does not got to Stan's funeral.

In October 1986, Hilda was drafted in again when Trevor and Polly went on holiday for two weeks without the kids. Neither Polly nor Trevor have been heard from again.
