= List of Coronation Street characters introduced in 1961 =

Coronation Street is a British soap opera, initially produced by Granada Television. Created by writer Tony Warren, Coronation Street first broadcast on ITV on 9 December 1960. The following is a list of characters introduced in the show's second year, by order of first appearance.

Originally written by Warren, the series is produced by Stuart Latham until July and then by Derek Granger from July onwards. In January, Latham introduced four new regular characters, the first batch to arrive since Warren's initial creations at the start of the series a month earlier. These were factory workers Sheila Birtles (Eileen Mayers) and Doreen Lostock (Angela Crow), timid shop assistant Emily Nugent (Eileen Derbyshire) and an extension to the Walker family, Annie and Jack's son Billy Walker (Kenneth Farrington). Derbyshire departed from the role of Emily in 2016.

January also saw the introduction of Len Fairclough (Peter Adamson), a character who would become one of the series' central figures and the show's most prominent alpha male. Adamson continued in the role for twenty-two years. Bryan Mosley also made his first appearance as Alf Roberts later in February; originally a recurring role, Alf was not made a regular until 1971. In April, petty criminal Jed Stone (Kenneth Cope) moved in. June saw the show's first birth, as Paul Cheveski was born to parents Linda and Ivan.

Granger took over as producer in July; he introduced Valerie Tatlock (Anne Reid) in early August, followed by Bill Gregory (Jack Watson) in his first of four short stints in October.

== Arnold Tanner ==
Arnold Tanner
- Coronation Street character
- Portrayed by: Frank Crawshaw
- Duration: 1961, 1966
- First appearance: 4 January 1961; Episode 8
- Last appearance: 20 June 1966; Episode 576
- Created by: Tony Warren
- Introduced by: Tony Warren (1961); Peter Eckersley (1966)
In-universe information
- Father: Wally Tanner
- Mother: Amy Tanner
- Brothers: Albert Tanner
- Wife: Elsie Grimshaw (1939–62); Norah Dawson (1962–?)
- Sons: Dennis Tanner
- Daughters: Linda Cheveski
- Grandsons: Paul Cheveski; Martin Cheveski

Arnold Tanner is the first husband of Elsie Tanner. In January 1961, he turned up on the doorstep of number 11 after an absence of fifteen years in order to meet his two children and ask for a divorce from Elsie so he could marry his new girlfriend Norah Dawson. At first Elsie refused, but was persuaded otherwise when Arnold threatened to cite her wartime romances in their divorce. He was last seen in June 1966.

== Dot Greenhalgh ==
Dot Greenhalgh
- Coronation Street character
- Portrayed by: Joan Francis
- Duration: 1961–1969
- First appearance: 6 January 1961; Episode 9
- Last appearance: 12 November 1969; Episode 927
- Created by: Tony Warren
- Introduced by: Tony Warren (1961); Stuart Latham (1961); Derek Granger (1961); H. V. Kershaw (1962–1963, 1965–1967, 1969); Tim Aspinall (1964); Richard Doubleday (1968)
In-universe information
- Father: Jack Todd
- Mother: Vi Todd
- Brothers: Jim Todd
- Sisters: Sally Hart
- Husband: Walter Greenhalgh
- Daughters: Samantha Greenhalgh
- Grandfathers: Alfred Makepiece
- Grandmothers: Daisy Todd; Ivy Makepiece
- Nephews: Clark Hart

Dorothy "Dot" Greenhalgh (also Todd) is first seen as the long-time best friend of Elsie Tanner. The pair worked together at Miami Modes, a local clothes shop, and eventually Dot was given a promotion to supervisor—but left soon after to work at a department store. Dot had several flings in her time despite being married, and in 1969, her husband Walter finally finished with her; and on top of this she lost her fancy new job. Miami Modes took her back, but when she stole stock and then blamed Elsie, her life in Weatherfield came to an end. She admitted her guilt, got the sack, and Elsie refused to speak to her ever again.

== Joe Makinson ==
Joe Makinson
- Coronation Street character
- Portrayed by: Brian Rawlinson
- Duration: 1961, 1963, 1970
- First appearance: 13 January 1961; Episode 11
- Last appearance: 19 August 1970; Episode 999
- Created by: Tony Warren
- Introduced by: Tony Warren (1961); H. V. Kershaw (1963); June Howson (1970)

Joe Makinson is a plumber who arrives early in 1961 to carry out work for Christine Hardman. Having just dumped her boyfriend Malcolm for his lack of support following her mother's death, and on discovering that May had unpaid debts, Christine's struggle sparked sympathy from Joe, who paid for the plumbing bill himself. Joe then asked Christine for a date and they became an item. After a few months Joe asked Christine for her hand in marriage and they became engaged, but soon afterward Christine decided she needed more excitement in her life, and subsequently broke up with him. Joe was heartbroken.

Joe briefly returned in 1963 and resumed his affair with Christine, but he ended it when he realised he meant nothing to her. He returned again in 1970 to settle a debt with Alan Howard.

== Beattie Pearson ==
Beattie Pearson
- Coronation Street character
- Portrayed by: Gabrielle Daye
- Duration: 1961–1962, 1969, 1971, 1973, 1975, 1981, 1983–1984
- First appearance: 13 January 1961; Episode 11
- Last appearance: 16 May 1984; Episode 2412
- Created by: Tony Warren
- Introduced by: Tony Warren (1961); Derek Granger (1961); H.V. Kershaw (1962, 1969); Leslie Duxbury (1971); Eric Prytherch (1973); Susi Hush (1975); Bill Podmore (1981); Mervyn Watson (1983, 1984)
In-universe information
- Father: Albert Tatlock
- Mother: Bessie Tatlock
- Husband: Norman Pearson
- Sons: Bill Pearson
- Grandfathers: William Tatlock; Arthur Vickery
- Grandmothers: Emmeline Tatlock
- Uncles: Alfred Tatlock
- First cousins: Joyce Tatlock; Valerie Barlow
- Other relatives: Ada Broadbent; Peter Barlow; Susan Barlow; Adam Barlow; Simon Barlow

Beatrice "Beattie" Pearson (also Tatlock) is the daughter of the late Albert Tatlock, played by Gabrielle Daye. Beattie was first seen on Coronation Street in 1961 visiting her father. Beattie's visits were quite rare; she usually came to the street when she wanted something. She attended the wedding of Ken Barlow to her cousin Valerie Tatlock in 1962, and also attended Val's funeral in 1971. She moved in with Albert for a few weeks when she left her husband, Norman, but Albert soon sent her back. In 1975 she along with the rest of the Street attended Albert's 80th Birthday street party. In 1981, on another visit to Coronation Street, Beattie was afraid that she would have to have Albert live with her because Ken and Deirdre Barlow were thinking of leaving the street, but she was glad when they decided to stay. Beattie's last appearance was after Albert died in 1984. Beattie gave Ken his First World War medal at his funeral, saying that Albert always looked upon him as a son.

== Doreen Lostock ==
Doreen Lostock
- Coronation Street character
- Portrayed by: Angela Crow
- Duration: 1961–1963, 1970
- First appearance: 18 January 1961; Episode 12
- Last appearance: 2 October 1963; Episode 293; 25 February 1970; Episode 957 (flashback)
- Created by: Tony Warren
- Introduced by: Tony Warren (1961); H. V. Kershaw (1962); June Howson (1970)
In-universe information
- Father: Jack Lostock
- Mother: Amy Lostock

Doreen Carole Lostock and her friend Sheila Birtles first appeared when they worked at Elliston's Raincoat Factory. Doreen briefly dated Billy Walker before he left for London in August 1961, and became the third Rovers barmaid that year. Due to the Equity Actor's Strike, Doreen was absent from the Street from November 1961 until June 1962, but like many others the absence was left unexplained upon her return. Eventually, two weeks after Sheila's suicide attempt forced her to leave the Street, Doreen herself found she had nothing left in Weatherfield and went to join the Women's Royal Army Corps. She reappears as part of a dream sequence of Elsie Tanner in February 1970 when Elsie reminisces about her relationship with Bill Gregory.

== Billy Walker ==
Billy Walker
- Coronation Street character
- Portrayed by: Kenneth Farrington
- Duration: 1961–1964, 1969–1975, 1977–1979, 1984
- First appearance: 27 January 1961; Episode 15
- Last appearance: 5 December 1984; Episode 2471
- Created by: Tony Warren
- Introduced by: Stuart Latham (1961); H.V. Kershaw (1962, 1963, 1964); Margaret Morris (1963); John Finch (1969); June Howson (1970); Brian Armstrong (1972); Bill Podmore (1977, 1978, 1979); Mervyn Watson (1984)
In-universe information
- Father: Jack Walker
- Mother: Annie Walker
- Sisters: Joan Davies
- Grandfathers: Amos Walker; Edmont Beaumont
- Grandmothers: Joan Walker; Florence Beaumont
- Uncles: Arthur Walker; Jim Walker
- Aunts: Louise Walker; Alice Walker
- Other relatives: Mavis Walker; Tom Walker

Billy Walker was the son of Annie and Jack Walker and first appeared 27 January 1961. He was played by actor Kenneth Farrington.

Farrington was originally tested for the part of Dennis Tanner; producers felt that he did not suit the role and it later given to actor Philip Lowrie. Farrington told Ken Roche of TVTimes that "they did not think I was right for it, so they wrote me into the series as the son of Annie Walker (Doris Speed)". The actor had spent time away from Coronation Street pursuing other projects; he told Roche that he enjoyed the breaks because each time he would return she felt "refreshed".

Billy was the son of Jack and Annie, landlords of the Rovers Return Inn. Although he grew up in Weatherfield, Billy moved to London to run a garage in 1961, and only made fleeting appearances in Coronation Street until Jack died in 1970 and Billy returned to help out at the Rovers to ease the burden on Annie. A mechanic by trade, Billy was never happy behind the bar of the Rovers and left Weatherfield several times in the early 1970s to work in London again.

In 1974, Billy became engaged to Deirdre Hunt. With the wedding only weeks away in 1975, Billy called it off and left to take a job in Jersey, which became Billy's new home. In the years that followed, Billy occasionally returned, usually to ask Annie for money for the latest business deal, which interested him as he usually gambled his own money away and was always debt-ridden. He kept tabs on Deirdre, despite her marrying and divorcing Ray Langton in his absence, and unsuccessfully tried to convince her to make a new start with him in Jersey.

When Annie retired in 1984, Billy took over the Rovers licence at her request, but after a short time as landlord he was forced out by the brewery for holding after-hours parties and he left Weatherfield again and returned to Jersey. It is not known what has happened to Billy in the years since his departure due to never being mentioned.

== Joan Walker ==
Joan Walker
- Coronation Street character
- Portrayed by: June Barry (1961–1964); Dorothy White (1978)
- Duration: 1961, 1963–1964, 1978
- First appearance: 3 February 1961; Episode 17
- Last appearance: 17 May 1978; Episode 1809
- Introduced by: Stuart Latham (1961); Margaret Morris (1963); Bill Podmore (1978)
In-universe information
- Father: Jack Walker
- Mother: Annie Walker
- Brothers: Billy Walker
- Husband: Gordon Davies (1961–)
- Grandfathers: Amos Walker; Edmont Beaumont
- Grandmothers: Joan Walker; Florence Beaumont
- Uncles: Arthur Walker; Jim Walker; Fred Walker; Ernest Walker
- Aunts: Louise Walker; Alice Walker; Gertie Walker
- Other relatives: Mavis Walker; Tom Walker

Joan Davies (née Walker) is the daughter of Jack and Annie Walker. She is one half of the first couple to wed on Coronation Street and moved to Derby with her new husband soon after the wedding. As far as we know Joan and her husband Gordon were still together by the time the last Walker, her brother Billy, left the Street in 1984—making their marriage one of the longest and most successful in the show's history.

In 2019, a writer from Soap World included Joan and Gordon's ceremony in their feature profiling soap weddings. They wrote "Joan and the ex-RAF man didn't seem a match made in heaven but went the distance!"

== Fred Jackson ==
Fred Jackson
- Coronation Street character
- Portrayed by: Joe Gladwin
- Duration: 1961, 1963–64, 1966
- First appearance: 22 February 1961; Episode 21
- Last appearance: 9 February 1966; Episode 539
- Introduced by: Stuart Latham
In-universe information
- Brothers: Frank Jackson
- Wife: Mary Jackson

Fred Jackson was the owner and manager of Jackson's Chip Shop in Victoria Street in the 1960s. He lived in the flat above the shop with wife Mary with occasional assistance from his brother Frank.

In 1963, Fred told Doreen Lostock that Len Fairclough had inquired about landlord Wormold's address. Elsie Tanner was trying to find out who tipped off the landlord that she had taken a lodger. On 20 March, Fred was bothered by the music from the Glad Tidings Mission Hall, which he incorrectly attributed to the Over 60s club, unaware that four youths who had just left his shop at closing time had descended on the Mission.

Although not appearing after 1966, both Fred and the shop were mentioned until the mid-1980s.

== Colin Lomax ==
Colin Lomax
- Coronation Street character
- Portrayed by: Davy Jones (1961); Alec Sabin (1972)
- Duration: 1961, 1972
- First appearance: 6 March 1961; Episode 25
- Last appearance: 13 September 1972; Episode 1216
- Introduced by: Stuart Latham
In-universe information
- Father: Bob Lomax
- Mother: Vera Lomax
- Wife: Karen Lomax
- Sons: Jason Lomax
- Grandfathers: Alfred Sharples
- Grandmothers: Ena Sharples
- Uncles: Ian Sharples; Tom Schofield (great)
- Aunts: Madge Sharples; Alice Raynould (great)
- First cousins: Tom Schofield Jr. (1st cousin once)

Colin Lomax was the son of Bob and Vera Lomax and grandson of Ena Sharples. In the 1960s, Vera occasionally relied on Ena to look after Colin; Ena didn't object, for she could fleece information from Colin about what her family were saying about her behind her back. By 1966, Colin was being raised by Vera alone, although when Vera couldn't cope she left Colin with Bob. Colin and Bob both turned up at Vera's funeral when she died of a brain tumour in 1967 (although they were not seen on-screen).

Colin went on to marry Karen and they had a son, Jason. By 1972 the family was living in West Hartlepool. Colin hadn't seen Ena in years, remembering only that he was scared of her, and Ena in turn had no idea that Colin had married or that she was a great-grandmother. In September that year they paid an impromptu visit to Weatherfield and called at Ena's Community Centre accommodation only to be informed by Lucille Hewitt that Ena was away on a Street outing to the Preston Guild and wouldn't be back until late in the evening. With nowhere else to go, they spent the remainder of the evening nursing drinks in the Rovers Return Inn, although as Annie Walker refused to have a baby on licensed premises, Karen volunteered to leave Jason in his pram outside so that she and Colin could stay and wait for Ena. They had only been there a short time when Karen went out to check on Jason and discovered that pram and baby were gone. The police were called immediately, and the Street residents who weren't at the Preston Guild rallied round to help the police with their enquiries while Colin and Karen were looked after by Annie and a policewoman in the Rovers back room. When questioned by a detective inspector, Colin was near-catatonic and Karen hysterical. The kidnapping sparked a large-scale search by the police and the army, but fortunately the baby was found after just two days, his pram abandoned on waste ground with Jason unharmed inside. Ena returned in the midst of the investigation having been summoned home from the Preston Guild. The kidnapper wasn't identified until January 1973, when Christine Peters' suspicious behaviour caused Emily Bishop to investigate and discover that she snatched Jason, for she had lost her own baby and was suffering mentally from the loss.

Ena spent Christmas with the Lomaxes in Hartlepool in 1972 and also visited them from 1977 to 1978. When Ena returned to the Street, she revealed to her friends that Colin and Karen had asked her to stay permanently but that she had graciously turned down the offer.

Colin is notable for having future Monkees member Davy Jones originating the role in 1961.

== Alice Burgess ==
Alice Burgess
- Coronation Street character
- Portrayed by: Avis Bunnage
- First appearance: 27 March 1961; Episode 30
- Last appearance: 8 May 1961; Episode 42
- Introduced by: Stuart Latham
In-universe information
- Father: Thomas Hewitt
- Mother: Mary Hewitt
- Brothers: Harry Hewitt
- Sisters: Frances Hewitt
- Husband: Sam Burgess
- Grandfathers: Samuel Hewitt; Alfred Makepiece
- Grandmothers: Dolly Hewitt; Ivy Makepiece
- Nephews: Christopher Hewitt
- Nieces: Lucille Hewitt

Alice Burgess is the widowed sister of Harry Hewitt, who moved in and became his housekeeper. Her presence meant that Harry's daughter Lucille could come home from her orphanage, but Lucille was very hostile towards her bossy aunt and after a couple of months Alice packed up and left, prompting Harry to propose to Concepta Riley in the hope of her becoming a new mother for Lucille.

== Walter Fletcher ==
Walter Fletcher
- Coronation Street character
- Portrayed by: Donald Morley
- First appearance: 5 April 1961; Episode 33
- Last appearance: 16 August 1961; Episode 71
- Introduced by: Stuart Latham

Walter Fletcher was a sales rep who met Elsie Tanner working at Miami Modes. He chatted her up and invited her on a date. Elsie was reluctant but agreed to go out with him. By the time their date came round, Elsie had already set her sights on Arthur Dewhurst, so her son-in-law Ivan Cheveski told Walter that Arthur was Elsie's husband and successfully scared him off. Elsie feared that the gossip would spread at work and jeopardise her divorce from real husband Arnold.

== Marian Lund ==
Marian Lund
- Coronation Street character
- Portrayed by: Patricia Heneghan (1961); Linda Marlowe (2008)
- Duration: 1961, 2008
- First appearance: 17 April 1961; Episode 36
- Last appearance: 11 July 2008; Episode 6858
- Introduced by: Stuart Latham (1961); Kim Crowther (2008)

Marian Lund was a librarian who worked at the university which Ken Barlow attended. Despite being eleven years his senior, Marian and Ken began a love affair after he ended his relationship with Susan Cunningham. However, the romance ended when Ken found out that Marian had a fiancé.

Ken and Marian next crossed paths 47 years later when a university reunion brought them back together. They briefly hinted at their past relationship, though no direct connection to Marian was addressed.

== Jean Stark ==
Jean Stark
- Coronation Street character
- Portrayed by: Renny Lister
- First appearance: 24 April 1961; Episode 38
- Last appearance: 23 October 1961; Episode 90
- Introduced by: Stuart Latham
In-universe information
- Father: Mr Stark
- Mother: Mrs Stark

Jean Stark was played by Renny Lister. She first appeared as a workmate of Christine Hardman's and when Jean fell out with her parents it was Christine she turned to for support, who invited her to move in as lodger. She did not stay long, and Christine was left alone once again. In reality, actress Renny Lister was meant to be a permanent cast member but a strike by the actor's union Equity meant that only a few of the main characters could appear for a period at the end of 1961. However, when the strike was over, Lister was not invited back and Jean's disappearance was left unexplained. She also briefly dated Jed Stone, a friend of Dennis Tanner. Their date did not go very well, however the actress Renny Lister is married to the actor who played Jed, Kenneth Cope, known for Randall and Hopkirk (Deceased), in real life.

== Tom Hayes ==
Tom Hayes
- Coronation Street character
- Portrayed by: Dudley Foster
- First appearance: 29 May 1961; Episode 48
- Last appearance: 3 July 1961; Episode 58
- Introduced by: Stuart Latham
In-universe information
- Father: Sidney Hayes
- Mother: Alice Hayes
- Brothers: Fred Hayes
- Sisters: Esther Hayes; Ada Harvey

Thomas "Tom" Hayes was the surprisingly wayward brother of the more staid and proper Esther Hayes. He spent many years in London, leaving Esther to look after their bed-ridden mother, drifting from one job to another. Released from prison and with nowhere else to go in May 1961, he foisted himself upon his sister, disrupting her life and routine. Post-prison schemes to make money included trying to sell a fruit machine to Jack and Annie Walker, and attempting to persuade his sister to invest in jukeboxes. Eventually a confrontation with Brian Foley, Esther's boss and friend, was what persuaded him to leave her alone. He disappeared overnight without explaining to Esther why he was going, nor where to.

== Nancy Leathers ==
Nancy Leathers
- Coronation Street character
- Portrayed by: Norah Hammond
- Duration: 1961–1962
- First appearance: 31 May 1961; Episode 49
- Last appearance: 1 August 1962; Episode 171
- Introduced by: Stuart Latham (1961); H.V. Kershaw (1962)
- Book appearances: Coronation Street:The Complete Saga
In-universe information
- Occupation: Former Dish washer
- Husband: George Leathers (1916)
- Daughters: Ida Barlow; Ethel Leathers; Vera Leathers
- Grandsons: Ken Barlow; David Barlow
- Other relatives: Lawrence Cunningham; Peter Barlow; Susan Barlow; Darren Barlow; Daniel Osbourne; James Cunningham; Adam Barlow; Simon Barlow; Bertie Osbourne; Tracy Barlow (adoptive); Amy Barlow (adoptive)

Nancy Leathers was the mother of resident Ida Barlow and grandmother of Ken Barlow and David Barlow. Nancy had been widowed when her husband George, Ida's father, had been killed in action during the First World War. Nancy lived with the Barlows for some time during 1961 before moving into an OAP bungalow. She made her last appearance at Ken's wedding to Valerie Tatlock in 1962. It is assumed she died before the birth of her great grandchildren Susan Barlow and Peter Barlow.

== Paul Cheveski ==
Paul Cheveski
- Coronation Street character
- Portrayed by: Victoria Elton (1961–1962); Marcus Saville (1966–1967); Nigel Greaves (1972)
- Duration: 1961–1962, 1966–1967, 1972
- First appearance: 14 June 1961; Episode 53
- Last appearance: 8 March 1972; Episode 1162
- Introduced by: Stuart Latham (1961); H. V. Kershaw (1962, 1966); Jack Rosenthal (1967); Eric Prytherch (1972)
In-universe information
- Father: Ivan Cheveski
- Mother: Linda Cheveski
- Brothers: Martin Cheveski
- Grandfathers: Kazimierz Cheveski; Arnold Tanner
- Grandmothers: Biasia Cheveski; Elsie Tanner
- Uncles: Dennis Tanner
- Other relatives: Wally Tanner; Bernard Butler; Sandra Butler; Colin Grimshaw; Eileen Grimshaw; Jason Grimshaw; Todd Grimshaw

Paul Cheveski was the son born to Ivan and Linda Cheveski in 1961. He was the first baby to be born on Coronation Street and moved to Canada with his parents shortly after his birth. Paul made his last appearance in 1972.

== Mario Bonarti ==
Mario Bonarti
- Coronation Street character
- Portrayed by: Frank Coda
- First appearance: 17 July 1961; Episode 62
- Last appearance: 6 September 1961; Episode 77
- Introduced by: Derek Granger
In-universe information
- Father: Leo Bonarti

Mario Bonarti was an Italian immigrant who bought the lease to Snape's Café, and opened up a new Italian restaurant with his father Leo as head chef. Ena Sharples was strongly against the restaurant, but won a free meal in a raffle and did not see the sense in depriving herself. Mario was instantly attracted to Christine Hardman, but she found him too possessive and dumped him after a while.

== Valerie Barlow ==
Valerie Barlow
- Coronation Street character
- Portrayed by: Anne Reid
- Duration: 1961–1971
- First appearance: 7 August 1961; Episode 68
- Last appearance: 27 January 1971; Episode 1047
- Introduced by: Derek Granger
- Book appearances: Coronation Street:The Complete Saga
In-universe information
- Occupation: Hairdresser
- Father: Alfred Tatlock
- Mother: Edith Tatlock
- Half-sisters: Joyce Tatlock
- Husband: Ken Barlow (1962–1971)
- Sons: Peter Barlow
- Daughters: Susan Barlow
- Stepsons: Lawrence Cunningham
- Grandsons: Adam Barlow; Simon Barlow
- Grandfathers: William Tatlock
- Grandmothers: Emmeline Tatlock
- Uncles: Albert Tatlock; Hector Brown
- First cousins: Beattie Pearson
- Other relatives: Ada Broadbent

Valerie Barlow (also Tatlock) is Ken Barlow's (William Roache) first wife and featured in the programme for nearly ten years before being killed by an electric shock when using a faulty electrical outlet in her home. Reid originally joined the soap for two months, but ended up staying longer so that her character could be married to Ken, in what was deemed an early example of a soap opera supercouple. Valerie was later written out of the soap when Reid opted to leave the soap after nine years, and Valerie was killed off in early 1971, with 18.26 million viewers watching her death scene. Reid later revealed in an interview that she felt she was bored and "going mad" after being in the soap for nine years, commenting, "I was so frustrated, I didn't get a laugh in nine years." She also opined that despite being privately educated, she was dubbed by casting directors as being working class, after appearing in the soap, explaining, "Once you've done Coronation Street, you're working class. I do think that hangs about."

Valerie Tatlock was born on 26 November 1942 to Alfred and Edith Tatlock, and grew up in Glasgow. Her uncle, Albert Tatlock, lived in Coronation Street in Weatherfield, and she was a successful hairdresser. Valerie took up residence at Albert's home at Number 1 Coronation Street for a few months in 1961. She immediately caught the eye of student Ken Barlow, who lived next door. They went on a date, but Valerie was not as keen on a relationship as Ken. She felt that Ken would not be happy with her because he was university-educated and aspired to live above the working-class values, which Valerie was comfortable with. When Ken's mother Ida was killed in September 1961, Valerie spent more time with Ken and they soon began a relationship. As the pair grew closer over the next few months, Valerie had to return home to Glasgow. Valerie returned a year later after Ken proposed to her in Scotland. She accepted after he made it clear that he was not looking for a mother figure to replace Ida, as Val initially feared. They got married at St. Mary's Parish Church on 4 August 1962, and took their honeymoon in London, which was paid for with the money Ken raised from selling his motorcycle.

The Barlows moved into 9 Coronation Street when they returned from their honeymoon. Valerie converted the front room of the house to a salon, earning extra income for the couple. Married life was not always easy for Valerie. Ken's ambitions sometimes got the better of him — later in 1962, he wanted to give up teaching to focus on writing, meaning the pair would be relying solely on the money Valerie was bringing in. He later had a change of heart and stayed in teaching. Despite his commitment to her, Valerie often felt Ken had settled for second best. She was jealous of Ken's friendship with Christine Hardman before Christine got engaged to Ken's father, Frank. Valerie also felt out of her depth intellectually when the Barlows entertained Ken's middle-class friends. Valerie tried to make the relationship work, but Ken did not make it easy, always pondering intellectual issues and oblivious to Valerie's troubles as she took care of the house.

In 1963, one of Ken's teaching friends, Dave Robbins, moved into the Barlows' house as a lodger. Ken and Dave were putting their careers in jeopardy by giving a TV interview arguing for a school crossing after a pupil was knocked down in Bessie Street. At the last moment, Dave pulled out, and Ken lost out on a promotion as he gave the interview without the school's permission. Dave blamed himself for the child being hit, and was comforted by Valerie. As Ken despaired about losing the promotion, he told Valerie they should not have married as Valerie did not really understand him. By the time Ken next returned home, Valerie had left him for Dave. Ken confronted the pair, and it transpired Dave was not interested enough in Valerie to fight for her. Heartbroken, Valerie begged Ken to take her back, and he did. To help things get back to normal, the pair went on holiday.

In July 1964, Valerie found out she was pregnant. Ken was upset, but later became thrilled by the news. To prepare for the birth, Valerie closed down the salon and converted it into a nursery. In April 1965, Valerie went into labour and was driven to hospital in Len Fairclough's van. She gave birth to twins — a girl and a boy. The babies were christened at the same church Ken and Valerie got married in and were named Peter and Susan. Valerie's life changed completely as all her time went towards looking after the twins. She still had to pander to Ken's ego — he did not change his lifestyle after becoming a father, and continued his intellectual pursuits. The Barlows had many friends in the Street, and could easily find babysitters, allowing Valerie to attend evening classes in Sociology. In November 1965, while Valerie was at a class, Ken was looking after the twins, but when he stepped out to The Rovers Return Inn for a few minutes, a piece of coal fell from the fire, filling the house with smoke. Valerie returned home before Ken had put the fire out, but was outraged that he had left the babies alone while he went out to buy cigarettes. Valerie told Ken she would leave him if he ever smoked again.

In 1966, Ken had a fling with reporter Jackie Marsh, and was ready to leave Valerie for her until he realized what a good thing he had in Valerie, who was willing to assume all the domestic responsibilities and wait on him hand and foot. Valerie briefly left him and returned to Glasgow with the kids, but returned when he phoned her and convinced her to return, intending to be a more devoted husband from then on. The following year, Ken was arrested for attending an anti-Vietnam demonstration and chose to go to prison rather than admitting he was wrong and paying a £5 fine. Ken's principles were very important to him, but Valerie was disappointed that he chose his principles over his family, leaving Valerie to take care of the kids herself for a week. Valerie had considered paying the fine behind Ken's back, but could not bring herself to betray him. In 1968, the Mission of Glad Tidings and Elliston's Raincoat Factory across the Street were torn down to make way for a block of maisonettes. As they were being demolished, Ken and Valerie realised the twins were missing. They were found in the factory just before the wrecking ball hit — the parents were relieved.

Valerie thought about reopening the Salon as the twins grew older, but instead started working in the Corner Shop for Maggie Clegg. 1968 also saw a change of address for the Barlows; after seeing an artist's impression of the maisonettes, Valerie told Ken she wanted to move into one, as it had modern conveniences the 70-year-old Number 9 lacked. Ken did not want to move, and during a fight accused Val of having an affair with builder Ray Langton. Valerie then made Ken feel guilty by reminding him of his affair with Jackie. Ken eventually relented and the Barlows moved into Number 14. Shortly after the family moved in, convict Frank Riley held Valerie at gunpoint while Ken was away. Riley, a convicted rapist, demanded money and sex from Valerie, but was caught by the police before he got the chance after Valerie called for help by tapping an SOS on the pipes under the sink in the kitchen, which was heard by neighbor Ena Sharples. After the ordeal, Valerie told the police and Ken that Riley had not touched her, but Ken refused to believe her. This almost split the couple up.

In 1969, Valerie's mother Edith stayed with the Barlows, and tried to convince them to leave Weatherfield. When Edith took the twins out to the fair, she lost them, but they were found by an elderly woman who had taken them in and not contacted the family. Later that year, Alan Howard offered Valerie a job as head hairdresser at a new salon for £14 a week. Elsie Tanner had been appointed manager, and she and Valerie fought for superiority. Ken had thoughts about buying the Salon from Alan, but when he chatted about it with Dave Smith, he later found out that Smith had usurped him and bought the Salon first. Smith initiated a wave of changes at the Salon, offering Valerie a pay rise but sacking other staff. Valerie walked out along with the remaining staff members, convincing Smith to reinstate everybody. In November 1969, a coach trip took some of the residents of the street to Windermere. Whilst on the way back to Weatherfield, the coach crashed into a tree killing the driver and injuring Valerie and Ken. They soon recovered. In 1970, Ray Langton taught Valerie to drive while Ken was away on holiday. When he returned, he received a letter warning him that Valerie and Ray were having an affair. It transpired that Emily Nugent had written it, but she realised she was wrong and apologised.

In early 1971, Ken was offered a teaching position in Jamaica and Valerie agreed to emigrate. The residents of Coronation Street threw the pair a going-away party in The Rovers the night before their planned departure. Valerie was rushing to get to the party, and she tried to fix the plug on her hairdryer by tightening it with a potato peeler. Knowing it was still shoddy, she attempted to use it anyway. Valerie plugged it in and was given a severe electric shock, which killed her instantly. As she fell to the floor, she knocked a portable heater into a packing crate and started a blaze. By the time rescue came, it was too late for Valerie. The street watched in horror as the house was left on fire.

== Nona Willis ==
Nona Willis
- Coronation Street character
- Portrayed by: Barbara Ferris
- First appearance: 30 August 1961; Episode 75
- Last appearance: 4 October 1961; Episode 85
- Introduced by: Derek Granger

Nona Willis was a new barmaid installed at the Rovers to replace Doreen Lostock, who had just quit. Cockney Nona was not easily accepted by the locals after she had told of her past as an exotic dancer and found life in Weatherfield hard. She eventually gave Jack her notice, citing that she found the northern accents difficult to understand.

== DS Sowman ==
DS Sowman
- Coronation Street character
- Portrayed by: Philip Stone
- Duration: 1961–1962, 1965
- First appearance: 11 September 1961; Episode 78
- Last appearance: 27 September 1965; Episode 500
- Introduced by: Derek Granger (1961); H.V. Kershaw (1962); Howard Baker (1965)

Detective Sergeant Sowman was the policeman on duty when the call came through that Ida Barlow was missing. When he matched the description Ida's husband Frank gave him to an earlier incident, he sent an officer around to give the Barlows the news that Ida had died. He was next seen as the police officer on scene when Christine Hardman threatened to jump off the factory roof. Luckily however, Christine was talked down by old friend Ken Barlow.

DS Sowman last appearance came as he attempted to track down Elsie Tanner, who had fled the scene of a car accident of which she was involved in with Robert Maxwell.

== Bill Gregory ==
Bill Gregory
- Coronation Street character
- Portrayed by: Jack Watson
- Duration: 1961–1962, 1970, 1983–1984
- First appearance: 18 September 1961; Episode 80
- Last appearance: 4 January 1984; Episode 2375
- Introduced by: Derek Granger (1961); H. V. Kershaw (1962, 1970); Mervyn Watson (1983)
In-universe information
- Wife: Phyllis Gregory (until 1970); Elsie Howard (1984–2004)

Bill Gregory is a recurring character played by actor Jack Watson between 1961 and 1984. Navy officer Bill first appears when he meets up with old friend Len Fairclough (Peter Adamson), who he served with in the war. Len introduces Bill to his friends and neighbours on Coronation Street, including his best friend Elsie Tanner (Patricia Phoenix). Bill and Elsie are quickly caught up in a love affair, with Bill neglecting to tell her that he is married — but the affair ends abruptly when Elsie receives a poison pen letter warning her against it. She decides to end it with Bill to save complicating her pending divorce from Arnold Tanner (Frank Crawshaw). In reality, actor Jack Watson had to leave his role without any on-screen resolve, due to the Equity actor's strike of 1961.

With Elsie's divorce finalised, Bill returns in July 1962 to pick up where they left off and learns Len is close to beating him to it, having spent a lot of time with Elsie. Bill warns Len off but Len insists they are just friends. Ena Sharples (Violet Carson) later discovers Bill writing to his wife Phyllis, and tells Len he must inform Elsie. Believing his excuses that they are separating, Len decides to keep quiet, so Ena tells Elsie herself. After confronting him, Bill tells Elsie that he is separated, but when Phyllis turns up Bill is forced to make his choice. Elsie tells him she cannot make up his mind for him, and so he leaves with Phyllis to give their marriage another chance.

Bill returns once again after an eight-year absence with the news that Phyllis has since died. With Elsie now being courted by Alan Howard (Alan Browning), Bill faced competition for her heart and proposed almost immediately. Elsie waits to make up her mind, while Alan fights to keep her in his life. He succeeds when she turns Bill down and he returns to service. Elsie later marries Alan.

Thirteen years on, and Bill returns from his Portugal home to pay his respects to Rita Fairclough (Barbara Knox) on hearing of the death of Len. Whilst in Weatherfield, Bill is stunned to learn that Elsie is back living on the Street as he thought she was still happily married with Alan in Newcastle. He wastes no time in going round to see Elsie, and takes her out for a meal to catch up. He tells her of his new life in Portugal, but informs her that he must return there the next day, and Elsie is shocked when Bill asks her to come with him. After hours of soul-searching, Elsie decides she's wasted enough of her life and packs her things. After a final walk down Coronation Street, Elsie climbs in the taxi and she and Bill head off for their new life in the sun.

In 2011, as Dennis Tanner (Philip Lowrie) returns to the Street, he tells Rita that Elsie and Bill were married after settling in Portugal and that after twenty happy years together they died holding hands in a car accident in 2004.

== Stanley Fairclough ==
Stanley Fairclough
- Coronation Street character
- Portrayed by: Peter Noone (1961); Ronald Cunliffe (1967); Jonathan Coy (1977)
- Duration: 1961, 1967, 1977
- First appearance: 11 December 1961; Episode 104
- Last appearance: 5 January 1977; Episode 1666
- Introduced by: Derek Granger (1961); Jack Rosenthal (1967); Bill Podmore (1977)
In-universe information
- Father: Len Fairclough
- Mother: Nellie Bailey
- Stepfather: Harry Bailey
- Stepmother: Rita Tanner
- Wife: Liz Brocklebank (1977–present)
- Grandfathers: Ned Fairclough
- Grandmothers: Grace Fairclough

Stanley Fairclough was the son of Len Fairclough and first wife Nellie. When his mother left Len for Harry Bailey, Stanley went with them and became distanced from his father. Opting to be brought up by Harry even after Nellie's death, Stanley resented Len's heavy-handed treatment of his mother for many years until 1977 when he burnt down Len's builders yard in revenge. Len was so hurt and incensed that he did not attend Stanley's wedding later that year.

== Others ==
Character	Date(s)	Episode(s)	Actor	Circumstances
Ginnie	4 January	8	Beryl Bainbridge	Student friends of Ken Barlow and Susan Cunningham, who helped in creating posters in the Barlows' living room ahead of a protest.
Milo	4 January	8	David Brierly	Student friends of Ken Barlow and Susan Cunningham, who helped in creating posters in the Barlows' living room ahead of a protest.
Glynis	4–25 January	8–14	Anna Gymer	Glynis worked at Elliston's Raincoat factory along with Doreen Lostock and Sheila Birtles. Glynis and Sheila were known for gossiping during their lunch breaks, and looking for male attention.
Customer	6 January	9	Nan Hargreaves-Jones	An awkward customer at Miami Modes who took her time in purchasing a suit from Elsie Tanner.
Norah Dawson	6 January	9	Avril Angers	Arnold Tanner's haughty new fiancée, who owned a sweet shop in Weatherfield. She arrived with Arnold when he was seeking a divorce from current wife Elsie, who referred to Norah she called her "Madame Toffee-Shop".
Hetty	13 January; 29 March	11; 31	Dorothy Frere	A Rovers regular, who frequented the snug. When Martha Longhurst fell out with Ena Sharples, somewhat childishly Martha befriended Hetty for a while until the women made up.
Milkman	13 January	11	Geoffrey Brightman	A Weatherfield milkman who heard Albert Tatlock's groans through the door on his morning round and alerted the Barlows to his collapse.
Eileen Hughes	20 January – 24 February	13–14; 18; 22	Prunella Scales	A bus conductress who fought Florrie Lindley for the affections of Harry Hewitt, even muscling in on Florrie's birthday dinner for him. It turned out that both Florrie and Eileen were wasting their time, as Harry was besotted with barmaid Concepta Riley.
Edwin Mason	25 January; 12 April; 1 April – 3 April 1963	14; 35; 240–241	Campbell Singer	Edwin Mason is the brother of May Hardman, who visited Christine after her mother's death in order to give her some money to live on and warned Joe Makinson to stay away. He later visited again and met Christine's husband-to-be Frank Barlow, of whom he disapproved.
Hilda Wardle	25 January	14	Vanda Godsell	Lady friend of Christine Hardman's uncle Edwin Mason, who comes to make sure Christine has enough money to live on following her mother's sudden death.
Policeman	27 January – 1 February	15–16	Jack Cunningham	Police officer who investigated a break in at the Tanner's, and took charge in evacuating the residents to the Mission Hall following a gas leak later that same day.
Johnny Gibson	3 February	17	Gerald Cowan	A hire purchase man who Ida Barlow bought loose covers from. When he came to the house, Ida's husband Frank had no idea and Ida was forced to admit using his services, which led to the couple rowing.
Gordon Davies	3 February – 3 March	17–19, 24	Calvin Malone	Schoolteacher fiancé of Joan Walker. Once he and Joan are married, they move to Derby; while Joan infrequently returns, Gordon does not. In 1963, Joan reveals to her mother Annie that Gordon doesn't want children and wants Joan to remain a housewife.
George Davies	15 February	19	Reg Lever	Parents of Gordon Davies, they came to meet the Walkers on learning of their son's engagement to Joan Walker. Jack and Annie invited them for dinner, where Annie and Hilda attempted to outdo each other.
Hilda Davies	15 February	19	Doris Hare	Parents of Gordon Davies, they came to meet the Walkers on learning of their son's engagement to Joan Walker. Jack and Annie invited them for dinner, where Annie and Hilda attempted to outdo each other.
Norma	15 February	19	Betty Davies	A friend of Eileen Hughes, who competed with her in a darts match in the Rovers against Harry Hewitt.
Mary Jackson	22 February; 24 February	21, 22	Barbara Ashcroft	Wife of Fred Jackson, owner of the local chippy on Victoria Street. A more gregarious person than her husband, she happily gossiped with Ida Barlow when she was a customer in the shop. In March 1963, Fred was disturbed by an impromptu party in Glad Tidings, he told Mary from his observation post at the window that he would be telling the police in the morning about chairman of the hall, Leonard Swindley. Mary did not appear.
Mary Stubbs	22 February	21	Joy Stewart	Estate agent for Mrs Briggs, who owns all the houses on Coronation Street. She attempts to get the residents to each buy their houses for £200, Frank Barlow shows interest but he tells her he cannot afford it.
Old lady	1 March	23	Totti Truman Taylor	An old lady whom Ena Sharples meets at the Town Hall when she goes to complain about her gas pressure. She tells her of a notice up about the proposed demolition of Coronation Street.
Phil Braithwaite	1 March; 16–18 October; 30 October	23; 88–89; 92	Brian Dean	A Town Hall employee who Ena Sharples went to complain to about her gas. He next appeared when he moved into the flat above the Corner Shop with his friend Norman Dobson. Phil and Norman were potential regular characters, but the Equity Actor's Strike prevented them from appearing just a few episodes after their return, and neither were seen again. Both were said to have moved out of the flat in January 1962.
Norman Dobson	1 March; 16–18 October; 30 October	23; 88–89; 92	Alan Holden	A Town Hall employee who Ena Sharples went to complain to about her gas. He next appeared when he moved into the flat above the Corner Shop with his friend Phil Braithwaite. Norman and Phil were potential regular characters, but the Equity Actor's Strike prevented them from appearing just a few episodes after their return, and neither were seen again. Both were said to have moved out of the flat in January 1962.
Dr Graham	3 March – 5 June; 7–9 August; 18 October	24–50; 68–69; 89	Fulton Mackay	The local GP of Weatherfield, who became a frequent visitor to the Mission as he dealt with patient Ena Sharples.
Uncle Fred	13 March	26	Edward Palmer	A guest at the wedding of Gordon Davies and Joan Walker. Gordon referred to him as Uncle Fred, although it was later discovered they bore no relation, and he was just a family friend. Fred's loud and talkative nature was a little overbearing for the Walkers.
Tom Walker	13 March	26	Tom Gowling	Relations of Jack Walker, who attended the wedding of Gordon and Joan in March.
Mavis Walker	13 March	26	Veronica Howard	Relations of Jack Walker, who attended the wedding of Gordon and Joan in March.
Eunice Bond	15 March	27	Angela Douglas	A stripper who went by the name of La Composita. She, and her pet python, briefly dated Dennis Tanner.
Mr Lawther	15 March	27	Reginald Marsh	Manager of Weatherfield County football club, who signs David Barlow.
Jim Schofield	15 March	27	Gordon Rollings	
Mr Harper	22 March	29	Joby Blanshard	Town Hall official who assured the residents that Coronation Street was not going to be demolished.
Sylvia Snape	22 March – 5 April	29–31; 33	Patricia Routledge	Owner of Snape's Café on Rosamund Street, and briefly the boss of Doreen Lostock. She did not take kindly to Alice Burgess criticising her display of cream cakes, and later complimented Doreen on her handling of two teddy boys intent on causing trouble. She flirted with Joe Makinson, despite her already being married. She and her husband Bernard sold up in July and moved to Newcastle.
Bryan	27 March	30	Bryan Hulme	
Leslie	27 March	30	John Kilby	
Waitress	3 April	32	Alison Bayley	A waitress who served the residents during a trip to Windermere.
Michael Regan	5 April	33	Shay Gorman	A man with whom Concepta Riley had a brief fling to make Harry Hewitt jealous. This was due to Concepta's mistaken belief that Harry had no feelings for her when she saw him with Florrie Lindley.
Bernard Snape	5 April	33	John Colin	The husband of Sylvia Snape, owner of the cafe on Rosamund Street.
Mrs Dumbarton	5 April – 24 October 1962	33; 194–195	Valerie Skardon (1961); Diana Coupland (1962)	The manager at Miami Modes, and boss of Elsie Tanner and Dot Greenhalgh. She was not popular amongst her staff, and they rejoiced when she left the store in 1963.
Norah Seddon	5 April; 25 August 1971; 3–5 April 1972; 16–18 January 1978	33; 1107; 1170–1171; 1774–1775	Cynthia Michaelis	Sister of Emily Nugent, she last appears after Emily's husband Ernest Bishop died, and offers her sister support.
Arthur Dewhurst	5 April – 28 June	33–57	Robin Wentworth	A detective who had a relationship with Elsie Tanner. He became overly clingy and possessive due to Elsie's many male friends, and she finished with him. Arthur got himself transferred after the split.
George Abbott	12 April – 3 May	35–41	Lane Meddick	Removal man who moved Ena Sharples' belongings when she lost her job as caretaker at the Mission. He also moved them back in three weeks later when Ena was reinstated.
Drunken customer	17 April	36	Morris Parsons	A customer at the Rovers Return, who was refused a pint by Concepta Riley because he was already drunk. Outraged, the man caused a scene and was thrown out by landlord Jack Walker.
Removal man	17 April	36	Harry Simons	Removal man who, along with George Abbott, moved Ena Sharples' belongings when she lost her job as caretaker of the Mission.
Clara	24 April	38	Doris Wellings	
Foreman	1 May	40	Dennis Handby	Foreman at Elliston's Raincoat factory.
Ernie Ashcroft	3 May	41	David Bell	
Taxi driver	15 May	44	Newal Palmer	
Mr Stark	22 May	46	John Barnett	Parents of Jean Stark who turned up on Coronation Street when Jean rebelled against them and moved in with Christine Hardman. They let Jean know she was free to make her own decisions.
Mrs Stark	22 May	46	Beatrice Varley	Parents of Jean Stark who turned up on Coronation Street when Jean rebelled against them and moved in with Christine Hardman. They let Jean know she was free to make her own decisions.
Jim Walker	22 May	46	Kenneth Mosley	Brother of Jack Walker who looked after the running of the Rovers while the Walkers went on a trip to Blackpool.
Wally Prentiss	22 May; 16 October	46; 88	Frank Pettitt	Driver of the coach that took the residents of Coronation Street on a trip to Blackpool in May, and again in October when they went to see the illuminations.
Baby shop assistant	29 May	48	Stephen Hancock	Shop assistant in 'Babyland', where Linda Cheveski was buying baby clothes.
Cyril	5 June	50	David Lamb	
Mr Collingwood	7 June	51	Barrie Cookson	Fiancé of Marian Lund, who informed Ken Barlow of their relationship, ending his affair with Marian.
Father Bennett	12 June; 4–6 September	52; 76–77	David Markham	Priest who performs the ceremony of Harry Hewitt to Concepta Riley. He appears as they plan their upcoming wedding, but does not appear when they marry.
Mrs Flanagan	12 June; 6 September	52; 77	Sybil Holroyd	
Brian Foley	19–21 June; 19 July; 16–18 October	54–55; 63; 88–89	Denis Holmes	Esther Hayes's boss who developed a friendship with her due to their similar interests. They visited galleries and concerts together, and Esther turned to him for support when her brother Tom was using her for money.
Michael Courtenay	26 June – 28 August	56–74	John Kelly	A member of the Over-Sixties Club of which Albert Tatlock became chairman and Michael treasurer. Minnie Caldwell fell for his charms but nothing came of it and they remained friends.
Peter Derwent	19–28 June	54–57	Philip Stone	
Harold Pilkington	21 June – 3 July	55–58	Philip Anthony	Boss at Elliston's Raincoat Factory where Christine Hardman, Doreen Lostock and Sheila Birtles worked. He got on Doreen's bad side when he started to grope her, and she eventually quit.
Foreman	21 June	55	Keith Marsh	Foreman at Elliston's Raincoat factory.
Maud	26 June	56	Doris Hare	
Joe Baumgarten	28 June	57	Bill Nagy	An old friend of Minnie Caldwell's, who lodged with her during the war. He and his wife Larine took Minnie out for a catch up.
Miss Pemberton	3 July	58	Joan Paton	An employee at Swindley's Emporium, who had long harboured a crush for him. She quit when Emily Nugent took over the stock and brought in several new lines.
Vince Plummer	5–19 July	59–63	Garfield Morgan	Relief manager at the Rovers who took over when Jack and Annie Walker went on holiday. He upset barmaid Concepta Riley when he made a move on her.
Phil Marsden	5 July	59	Neville Barber	Billy Walker's boss at Chiswick Garage, who offers him a promotion to foreman.
Patricia Holmes	10–12 July	60–61	Sarah Aimson	A thirteen-year-old girl who befriended Lucille Hewitt. It later transpired that she was a runaway from an approved school, and was soon caught by the police and sent back.
Leo Bonarti	17 July – 23 August	62–73	Steve Plytas	Father of Mario Bonarti, who installed him as the head chef in his new restaurant on Rosamund Street.
Audrey Plant	17 July – 7 August; 11 June 1962	62–68; 156	Mary Duddy	Machinist at Elliston's Raincoat factory, she worked with Christine Hardman, Doreen Lostock and Sheila Birtles.
Sam Johnson	31 July – 2 August	66–67	Ken Parry	Manager of the Orinoco club, where Dennis Tanner performs.
Betty Ridgeway	31 July – 2 August	66–67	Barbara Young	Hostess at the Orinoco club, who Billy Walker takes a shine to. She applies for a job as a barmaid at the Rovers, but nothing comes of it.
Mr Dixon	31 July – 14 August	66–70	Anthony Broughton	
Fairground Assistants	7 August	68	Leslie Clarke	Assistants at a fair in which Concepta Riley takes Lucille Hewitt.
Fairground Assistants	7 August	68	Mollie Hare	Assistants at a fair in which Concepta Riley takes Lucille Hewitt.
Darts Stallholder	7 August	68	Jack Woolgar	Another fairground assistant, who serves Concepta and Lucille.
Mr Lloyd	14–16 August	70–71	Lewis Wilson	Man from the brewery who offers the Walkers the chance to move to a new pub. They go with him to view it, but decide against moving.
James Nugent	21–23 August	72–73	Frank Pettingell	Father of Emily Nugent who comes to Weatherfield to meet Leonard Swindley, who is rumoured to be courting his daughter. In 1966, James suffers a stroke and Emily leaves Weatherfield for a year to take care of him. James dies sometime between 1967 and 1972.
Lenny Phillips	30 August – 11 September	75–78	John Barrie	Lenny is Dennis Tanner's agent and owner of the Sporting Club on Viaduct Street in the 60s. Lenny gave Dennis a job after spotting his talents at the Orinoco club.
Sean Riley	4 September – 4 October	76–77, 84–85	Harold Goldblatt	Parents of Concepta Riley, who came over to scout out her fiancé Harry Hewitt before their wedding. Although initially skeptical as Harry was Protestant and not Catholic, he won them round by saying any children of the marriage could be raised as Catholics. They returned later for Concepta's wedding. In 1964, Sean's ailing health meant that the Hewitts uprooted and moved over to Ireland, taking over his garage.
Shelagh Riley	4 September – 4 October	76–77, 84–85	Shela Ward	Parents of Concepta Riley, who came over to scout out her fiancé Harry Hewitt before their wedding. Although initially skeptical as Harry was Protestant and not Catholic, he won them round by saying any children of the marriage could be raised as Catholics. They returned later for Concepta's wedding. In 1964, Sean's ailing health meant that the Hewitts uprooted and moved over to Ireland, taking over his garage.
Station Sergeant	11 September	78	Anthony Sagar	A police sergeant at the station who took in a lost handbag. He later traced the bag back to Ida Barlow, who had been hit by a bus that day.
Agnes MacLean	11–25 September; 16 July 1962	78–82; 166	Judy Evans	A lady who hands in a lost handbag at the police station on the day of Ida's death.
Jim Foster	11 September – 9 October	78–86	Bernard Kay	The bus driver who knocked down and killed Ida Barlow. He later tracked down Ida's widower Frank to apologise.
Police Constable	11 September	78	Anthony Sweeny	A PC at the police station when the news of Ida's accident comes through.
Headquarters Constable	11 September	78	Keith Anderson	Constable who broke the news of Ida's death to the Barlows.
Fred Clark	20 September	81	Jack Smethurst	Drayman who tries to con Jack Walker out of two dozen bottles of beer.
Frank Jackson	25 September	82	Norman Bird	Brother of Fred, who helped his brother and sister-in-law occasionally by serving behind the counter.
Laura	25 September	82	Norma Wilson	
Mrs Brown	25 September	82	Nan Hargreaves-Jones	
Mr Powell	2 October	84	Stratford Johns	Guest at the hotel where Harry and Concepta Hewitt honeymooned in October.
Hotel receptionist	2 October	84	Jean Butler	Receptionist who books in Harry and Concepta on their honeymoon.
Mr Jackson	9 October	86	Derek Williams	Manager of a supermarket which opens on Rosamund Street. Ena Sharples wastes no time in telling him what she thinks about the venture.
Fortune teller	16 October	88	Julie Perry	A fortune teller who read the fortunes of Ena and Minnie Caldwell on a trip to see the Blackpool illuminations.
TV salesman	23 October	90	Michael Bilton	A man who sells a TV to Linda Cheveski.
Probationer Nurse	23 October	90	Carol Booth	Nurse at the hospital when Minnie Caldwell goes in after being hit by a piece of slate which fell off No. 13.
Mr Wentworth	30 October – 1 November	92–93	Barry Letts	Ken Barlow's boss at Amalgamated Steel.
Rupert	13 November	96	Cheeta	A performing monkey brought home by Dennis Tanner.
