= Frank Barlow (Coronation Street) =

Fictional character from Coronation Street

- Coronation Street character
- Portrayed by: Frank Pemberton
- Duration: 1960–1964, 1967, 1971
- First appearance: Episode 1; 9 December 1960
- Last appearance: Episode 1049; 3 February 1971
- Created by: Tony Warren
- Introduced by: Stuart Latham (1960); H.V. Kershaw (1967); Leslie Duxbury (1971)
- Book appearances: Coronation Street: The Complete Saga; Coronation Street: The War Years
In-universe information
- Father: Sidney Barlow
- Mother: Edna Barlow
- Sisters: Marjorie Barlow
- Wife: Ida Leathers (until 1961)
- Sons: Ken Barlow; David Barlow
- Grandsons: Lawrence Cunningham; Peter Barlow; Darren Barlow; Daniel Osbourne
- Granddaughters: Susan Barlow; Tracy Barlow (adoptive)
- Other relatives: James Cunningham; Chloe Cunningham; Adam Barlow; Simon Barlow; Bertie Osbourne; Amy Barlow (adoptive)

Frank Barlow is a fictional character from the British ITV soap opera Coronation Street, played by Frank Pemberton. As the head of the show's core Barlow family, Frank was one of the original twenty-one characters at the show's inception in 1960, along with wife Ida (Noel Dyson) and sons Ken (William Roache) and David (Alan Rothwell).

In his time on Coronation Street, Frank survived the death of Ida in 1961 and entered into a controversial relationship with younger woman Christine Appleby (Christine Hargreaves). He remained in a prominent role until May 1964, when the character was written out by series producer Tim Aspinall. Pemberton later reprised the role for two further episodes, in 1967 and 1971. Frank last appeared at the funeral of daughter-in-law Valerie Barlow (Anne Reid). Frank's son Ken later tells his son Peter (then played by Roache's own son Linus Roache) of his death in April 1975.

Pemberton never recovered from being made to leave a role he adored, and suffered a stroke in 1965. He found work increasingly hard to come by in the following years and suffered a fatal stroke in 1971, just a few weeks after his final appearance on the show.

== Creation ==
=== Casting ===
Frank Pemberton was offered the role of Frank Barlow on the day of his audition, after he had heard Granada were prepared to pay £40 a week for a "middle-aged dad with a genuine Lancashire accent". He later described the day as "the most exciting" of his life.

=== Background ===
Postman Frank has been described as the archetypal "hard-working northern man", he dedicated his life to providing for his family. The family's working-class background meant Frank was resentful of Ken upon his return from university before the first episode, and their differences spilled out into the early episodes and continued throughout.

Frank Barlow was born in 1913 to parents Edna and Sidney Barlow. Frank joined the navy when he was 16 and he became very much a "man's man". His influences in life from that early age were men, and he depended on his superiors when his father Sidney died and Frank's mother Edna was taken ill soon after and spent time in a psychiatric unit, which prompted Frank to leave the Navy once his training was finished. A few years later Frank was introduced to Ida Leathers, a friend of his sister Marjorie, and the pair quickly fell for each other. Frank and Ida married on 1 May 1938, and went on to have two sons, Kenneth (b. 1939) and David (b. 1942).

== Storylines ==
Frank Barlow is introduced as the pipe-smoking head of the Barlow family in the very first episode of Coronation Street in 1960. Frank resents the way his son Ken (William Roache) thinks himself superior to his family and their neighbours, and there is friction between the pair when Ken returns home from university. However, all their problems are put aside by the end of 1961 when they find themselves living alone. Frank's second son David (Alan Rothwell) leaves the street in the summer to begin a new career as a footballer, and in September, Frank's wife Ida (Noel Dyson) dies under the wheels of a bus. Ida's untimely death is a shock for Frank, who takes out his frustrations on Ken and tells him he is nothing but a disappointment when he learns that Ken was out of work. They patch up their differences soon enough and learn to cope together.

In early 1963, Frank finds love once again when his friendship with Christine Appleby (Christine Hargreaves), a widow, becomes something more. Their short-lived affair slips into an engagement and shocks the neighbours, especially as Christine had been at school with Ken. Eventually the romance ends when the age difference becomes too much and Christine realises her feelings for him are not as strong as his for her.

Frank recovers from his disastrous relationship with Christine by quitting his job at the post office to open a DIY shop on Victoria Street. The new venture is a success but has to close due to fire damage later in the year. In 1964, Frank wins £500 on the Premium Bonds and chooses to leave the Street for a new life in Wilmslow. He sells the shop and celebrates his farewell in the Rovers Return Inn on the same night Martha Longhurst (Lynne Carol) dies. He leaves the street two weeks later without saying goodbye to Ken.

Frank makes two further visits to the street: once in 1967, when Ken refuses to pay a fine and instead goes to prison, and then in 1971, when he arrives for the funeral of Ken's wife Valerie (Anne Reid).

Frank dies at some point between 1971 and April 1975.
