= Ida Barlow =

Fictional character from Coronation Street

- Coronation Street character
- Portrayed by: Noel Dyson
- Duration: 1960–1961
- First appearance: Episode 1; 9 December 1960
- Last appearance: Episode 77; 6 September 1961
- Created by: Tony Warren
- Introduced by: Stuart Latham
- Book appearances: Coronation Street: The Complete Saga; Coronation Street: The War Years
In-universe information
- Father: George Leathers
- Mother: Nancy Leathers
- Sisters: Ethel Leathers
- Husband: Frank Barlow (until 1961)
- Sons: Ken Barlow; David Barlow
- Grandsons: Lawrence Cunningham; Peter Barlow; Daniel Osbourne
- Granddaughters: Susan Barlow; Tracy Barlow (adoptive)
- Other relatives: James Cunningham; Chloe Cunningham; Adam Barlow; Simon Barlow; Bertie Osbourne; Amy Barlow (adoptive)

Ida Barlow is a fictional character from the British ITV soap opera Coronation Street, played by Noel Dyson between 1960 and 1961.

== Creation and development ==
=== Casting ===
Creator Tony Warren allegedly had Betty Alberge in mind to play Ida when writing the first scripts. Alberge was instead cast as shopkeeper Florrie Lindley. Dyson was subsequently cast as Ida.

=== Departure and death ===
After less than a year, it was announced that Dyson would no longer play Ida's role as she was tired of playing the character. It was then confirmed that the character would be killed. Ida was struck by a bus and Frank Barlow was devastated. Dyson played Ida in 41 episodes overall. Her final appearance was in episode 77; although no death scene was shown and the events of her death unfolded on-screen from the next episode onwards. She was the first regular character to die and the second overall (May Hardman was the first in episode 7).

== Storylines ==
Ida Leathers was born in 1916 to Nancy Leathers (Norah Hammond). Ida grew up and married Frank Barlow (Frank Pemberton) in 1938. They had two sons—Kenneth (William Roache) in 1939, and David Barlow (Alan Rothwell) in 1942. She spent most of her time looking after her family and running the household, rarely socialising.

Ida was friends with the Barlows' next-door neighbour, Albert Tatlock (Jack Howarth), and visited him on a regular basis, unlike his daughter Beattie Pearson (Gabrielle Daye), which sometimes caused friction between the two women (or at least disparaging comments from Beattie), despite Ida's calm nature.

Ida's mother Nancy Leathers moved into No.3 in 1961, due to her failing health, and no one expected her to outlive her daughter. One day when Ida was visiting Beattie, concern grew after Ida failed to arrive. Later that day, Frank learned that Ida had been hit by the bus she had intended to catch and had died. Ida's funeral episode achieved a new peak in viewership for Coronation Street, attracting 15.6 million viewers.

== Reception ==
In a 2019 article, Claire Crick from Digital Spy called Ida "saintly" and a "perfect wife and mother" and noted that fans were "left devastated" by the character's death.
