= List of Coronation Street characters introduced in 1969 =

1969 saw several new characters making their debuts on Coronation Street, including Betty Williams, Cyril Turpin, Janet Reid, the Butler siblings Sandra and Bernard, Alan Howard, Janice Langton, Edith Tatlock and Ada Broadbent.

== Janice Langton ==
Janice Langton
- Coronation Street character
- Portrayed by: Paula Wilcox
- First appearance: 22 January 1969
- Last appearance: 5 February 1969
- Introduced by: H.V. Kershaw
In-universe information
- Mother: Mary Langton
- Brothers: Ray Langton
- Nieces: Tracy Barlow
- Other relatives: Amy Barlow

Janice Langton was played by Paula Wilcox. Of her time playing Janice, Langton said, "The fame thing was such a shock when I was first in Coronation Street. I played Janice Langton – she was 17 and had run away from borstal – and the day after the first episode went out, I was at the shops and people started shouting my Coronation Street name, and I didn't know what to do." Wilcox later played another character, Elaine Jones, on Coronation Street between 2020 and 2023.

Janice arrives in Weatherfield when she runs away from her probation officer following a sentence for robbery with violence. Her brother allows her to stay with him at No.9. Whilst there, she offends him by making a pass at his friend and landlord Len Fairclough. Janice uses her growing friendship with Len as a cover for her relationship with Borstal boy Bob Neale, with whom she stole Dave Smith's car. Before Ray replaces Dave's car, Janice and Bob remove £500 cash from it, leading to Ray being suspected of stealing it. Janice is shortly afterwards evicted from No.9 and leaves Weatherfield for good.

When Ray was in hospital in November 1969 recovering from the coach crash in the Lake District, Ena Sharples visits him and reveals she tried to trace Janice for him, only to find that she was in a Remand Home. In 2005, Ray mentions that he has no living family, implying that Janice died sometime before 2005.

== Edith Tatlock ==
Edith Tatlock
- Coronation Street character
- Portrayed by: Clare Kelly
- Duration: 1969, 1971, 1973–1974, 1978
- First appearance: 12 May 1969
- Last appearance: 6 September 1978
- Introduced by: H.V. Kershaw (1969); Leslie Duxbury (1971); Eric Prytherch (1973, 1974); Bill Podmore (1978)
In-universe information
- Brothers: Hector Brown
- Husband: Alfred Tatlock (1936–unknown)
- Daughters: Valerie Barlow
- Grandsons: Peter Barlow
- Granddaughters: Susan Barlow
- Other relatives: Simon Barlow; Adam Barlow

Edith Tatlock (also Brown) was the second wife of Alfred Tatlock (his first wife Edna and their child Joyce died of scarlet fever) and mother of Valerie Barlow. She met and married Alfred in 1936, and she gave birth to Valerie, their only child, in 1942.

When Valerie married Ken Barlow in August 1962, Edith was unable to attend because she was ill. She came to Weatherfield to help Ken out when Val was in hospital. When she took her twin grandchildren Peter and Susan Barlow, she ended up losing them but they were eventually found again.

After Valerie's tragic death in 1971 from an electric shock and house fire, Ken took the twins to Scotland to stay with Edith and Alfred. Edith later returned to Weatherfield with Ken and decided it would be best to sell their house in Scotland so she and Alfred could stay in Coronation Street. However, Ken told Edith that he'd got a nanny/housekeeper who would help look after the twins, and feeling unwanted, Edith left to return to Glasgow. She came back a few months later and decided to take over as she did not think that Bet Lynch should be looking after the twins as she was "too tarty". When Ken returned home drunk from a night out, Edith decided to try to get custody of the twins. Instead Ken talked it over with Edith and decided it was best that the twins went and lived with her and Alfred in Glasgow.

Edith spent most of her years raising the twins, with Ken coming up to visit now and then. However, with his marriage to Janet Reid in 1973, Ken began making plans to relocate the twins back to Weatherfield and made enquiries with local schools. Edith had doubts about Janet's suitability and willingness to be a mother, but she did not stand in Ken's way. However, at her suggestion, Ken asked Peter and Susan whether they wanted to move back to Weatherfield and was shocked when they told him they did not. Their wishes put an end to the matter, although their decision did not sit well with Albert Tatlock, who only believed it when Edith told him.

When Peter received bad exams results in 1978 due to not putting in enough effort, Ken brought him back home so he could re-sit them under his supervision. Peter did not want to stay in Weatherfield and phoned Edith to come and collect him, but Ken made her leave without Peter, asserting that as Peter's father he had the last word.

Edith didn't return for Susan's wedding to Mike Baldwin in 1986 as she was too unwell to attend. Edith died sometime between 1986 and 2008.

Edith was portrayed by Clare Kelly on-off from 1969 to 1978. The actress was intended to return again in 1981 but was unable due to a heart attack before filming.

== Cyril Turpin ==
Cyril Turpin
- Coronation Street character
- Portrayed by: William Moore
- Duration: 1969–1970, 1972
- First appearance: 4 June 1969; Episode 882
- Last appearance: 19 July 1972; Episode 1201
- Introduced by: H.V. Kershaw (1969); Brian Armstrong (1972); Eric Prytherch (1972)
- Book appearances: Coronation Street: The Complete Saga
In-universe information
- Occupation: Policeman
- Sisters: Minnie
- Wife: Betty Preston (until 1974)
- Nieces: Margaret

Cyril Turpin is played by William Moore. Policeman Cyril arrived in Weatherfield with his wife Betty Turpin (Betty Driver) in 1969, moving into the flat above the Corner Shop, which was owned by Betty's sister Maggie Clegg (Irene Sutcliffe). Betty had moved there so that she could be there to support Maggie when her son Gordon Clegg (Bill Kenwright) to London. The Street residents enjoyed having a police officer living in their midst and often looked to him for legal advice, and in return Cyril exercised his hands-on approach to the law by giving neighbours a friendly warning before intervening when they were flouting the law. As the go-to man for many a crisis, Cyril soon got to know the locals and involved himself in community events, including a pub football match and the Rovers Christmas concert, in which he acted as Master of Ceremonies.

Cyril was fiercely protective of Betty. When Rovers landlady Annie Walker (Doris Speed) asked Cyril to persuade Betty to quit her barmaid job at the Rovers, Cyril advised Betty to stay put, as Annie's actions could be taken as pressuring a police officer. In 1970, ex-convict Keith Lucas, who had just completed a three-year jail sentence, threatened Betty while looking for Cyril, who he blamed for putting him away as Cyril was his arresting officer. When Cyril learned about this he set upon Lucas with a lead pipe, and had to be pulled off him by Len Fairclough (Peter Adamson). Cyril was appalled at his own behaviour and, after facing a disciplinary hearing, resigned from the police, having already entertained the notion earlier that year. He took a job in a solicitor's office, and he and Betty moved to 37 Hillside Crescent.

After the move, Cyril was not seen in Coronation Street often. He briefly considered buying into the Corner Shop in 1972 and tried to make Maggie feel guilty by pointing out how Betty had looked after her in the past. Alf Roberts (Bryan Mosley) fought Cyril on Maggie's behalf, convincing Cyril to back down.

After being unseen for many years, Cyril was finally killed off, off screen when In 1974, Cyril was intending to go to Len and Rita Littlewood's (Barbara Knox) engagement party in The Rovers but (unseen) collapsed and died outside his house, after suffering a heart attack. Betty was delivered the news by police during the party.

== Janet Reid ==
Janet Reid
- Coronation Street character
- Portrayed by: Judith Barker
- Duration: 1969, 1971, 1973–1975, 1977
- First appearance: 16 June 1969; Episode 885
- Last appearance: 21 February 1977; Episode 1680
- Introduced by: H.V. Kershaw (1969); Leslie Duxbury (1971); Eric Prytherch (1973); Susi Hush (1975); Bill Podmore (1977)
In-universe information
- Occupation: Clerk
- Father: Charles Reid
- Mother: Jacqueline Reid
- Sisters: Helen Ormerod
- Husband: Ken Barlow (1973–1977)
- Stepchildren: Peter Barlow; Susan Barlow; Lawrence Cunningham
- Uncles: George
- First cousins: Marilyn

Janet Felicity Reid (also Barlow) was played by actress Judith Barker from her debut in 1969 until she was killed off in 1977. Janet worked as the town clerk in Weatherfield. Always portrayed as an upwardly mobile homewrecker, she first came into the picture as a love interest for Len Fairclough, but she finished their relationship. In 1971, she set her sights on Alan Howard, but his wife, Elsie, saw Janet for what she was and confronted her in the corner shop, telling her exactly what she thought of her; Elsie's big heart, however, made her realise that Janet was a bleeding heart, who just wanted to be loved.

The Janet character was used as a plot device for the Ken Barlow character, so his storylines would become more interesting. Barker was quoted as saying, "She was used as a device, in the Ken relationship, and people were encouraged to hate her. I used to go about being terribly nice and pleasant to everybody in the hope that people would like her more."

In October 1973, Ken and Janet were wed, but the two clashed many times, most notably when it came to Ken's twins from his previous marriage to Val. Janet did not want to raise children, while Ken wanted them to return to Weatherfield (they were sent to live in Scotland after Val's death). Another key showdown came when Valerie's Uncle Albert, with whom Ken had since started to live with, told him that he did not like Janet, as she disapproved of the twins. In May 1974, Janet left Ken, telling him that she had no faith in him, that he had no drive or ambition. The day she left, Ken was offered a high-powered job at the Mark Brittain Warehouse opposite the Street.

While separated, Janet and Ken did not divorce; they did, however, date other people. Ken met Janet's new partner, a taxi driver, and the three of them got on very well. However, he too was to tire of Janet's forthright behaviour and he left her. In February 1977, Janet came to Ken's house and begged for him to take her back. He refused, but allowed her to stay the night in their bed — Ken slept on the sofa. Rejected by the one person she thought would never forsake her, a distraught Janet took an overdose of sleeping pills. Ken discovered her dead in bed the following morning, and the situation was complicated when Ken was initially suspected by the police of murdering her in order to avoid a divorce. Ken had lost his mother, father, brother, nephew and his first wife, and now he had lost another — all at a relatively early age.

== Ada Broadbent ==
Ada Broadbent
- Coronation Street character
- Portrayed by: Kit Hoult
- First appearance: 27 August 1969; Episode 905
- Last appearance: 1 September 1969; Episode 906
- Introduced by: H.V. Kershaw (1969)
In-universe information
- Father: Alfred Tatlock
- Mother: Louisa Tatlock
- Brothers: William Tatlock
- Nephews: Albert Tatlock; Alfred Tatlock
- Other relatives: Beattie Pearson; Valerie Barlow; Peter Barlow; Susan Barlow

Ada Broadbent was the ancient aunt of Albert Tatlock who he invited to his wedding to Alice Pickins in September 1969. Upon finding out that the vicar, the Reverend Vernon Lingard, would be driving to the service from Preston, he asked him to collect the old lady from her house at 31 Bloomfield Road, Ecclestone. He did warn the man of the cloth though that she was blunt spoken and called a spade a spade “with embellishments”.

The vicar duly collected her in his ancient car which broke down in a remote country lane. Ada asked him if he'd tested the electricals and had to join him in thumbing lifts from unresponsive drivers. At one point, hearing the sound of an engine approaching, they hopefully stood in position to beg a lift... only to see a plane flying overhead.

== Sandra Butler ==
Sandra Butler
- Coronation Street character
- Portrayed by: Patricia Fuller
- Duration: 1969–1970
- First appearance: 17 November 1969; Episode 928
- Last appearance: 31 August 1970; Episode 1003
- Introduced by: H.V. Kershaw
In-universe information
- Father: Terry Butler
- Mother: Fay Butler
- Brothers: Bernard Butler
- Grandfathers: Arthur Grimshaw
- Grandmothers: Alice Grimshaw
- Aunts: Elsie Tanner; Phyllis Bailey
- First cousins: Gary Bailey; Dennis Tanner; Linda Cheveski

Sandra Butler is the niece of Elsie Tanner, played by Patricia Fuller. She made her first appearance on 17 November 1969. Sandra was looking to become a hairdresser and soon after arriving, Elsie got Sandra a job at the local salon owned by Alan Howard, along with her brother Bernard. As the Butlers settled in Weatherfield, Sandra met Ray Langton and took care of him while he recovered from a serious accident. The pair became involved and eventually got engaged, setting the wedding for May, but it was called off when Sandra found out Ray had been unfaithful with their married neighbour Audrey Fleming. The Butlers were axed from Coronation Street just months after their arrival, and Sandra's exit storyline was her moving to London.

== Bernard Butler ==
Bernard Butler
- Coronation Street character
- Portrayed by: Gorden Kaye
- Duration: 1969–1970
- First appearance: 17 November 1969; Episode 928
- Last appearance: 29 June 1970; Episode 984
- Introduced by: H.V. Kershaw
In-universe information
- Father: Terry Butler
- Mother: Fay Butler
- Sisters: Sandra Butler
- Grandfathers: Arthur Grimshaw
- Grandmothers: Alice Grimshaw
- Aunts: Elsie Tanner; Phyllis Bailey
- First cousins: Gary Bailey; Dennis Tanner; Linda Cheveski

Bernard Butler is the nephew of Elsie Tanner played by Gorden Kaye between 1969 and 1970.

Bernard arrived in Weatherfield and his aunt Elsie Tanner's house in 1969 from Saddleworth, hot on the heels of his younger sister Sandra after their mother had been taken into hospital. The pair were allowed to lodge with Elsie for the foreseeable future, and Elsie got Bernard and Sandra jobs at Alan Howard's salon, where Elsie worked as manageress.

Kind-hearted Bernard was protective of Sandra, although he was a greater physical threat than he appeared; when Sandra's fiancé Ray Langton was seen kissing Audrey Fleming, Bernard knocked him to the floor in the Rovers pub.

Soon after arriving in the Street, Bernard fell for Irma Barlow, who was on a visit from Australia, and kept finding excuses to see her. When Irma returned to Weatherfield permanently when her husband David Barlow and son were killed in a car crash, Bernard was supportive but when her attentions moved to Dave Smith, Bernard realised Irma only saw him as a friend.

In 1970, Dave Smith unfairly sacked Bernard at the salon, causing the staff to walk out in protest. Bernard was spurred on by the staff to start up a rival business, but he was eventually persuaded to return. After being rejected by Irma, Bernard left Weatherfield and took a job back home in Saddleworth.

== Alan Howard ==
Alan Howard
- Coronation Street character
- Portrayed by: Alan Browning
- Duration: 1969–1974
- First appearance: 1 December 1969; Episode 932
- Last appearance: 16 January 1974; Episode 1357
- Introduced by: H.V. Kershaw
In-universe information
- Wife: Laura Howard (until 1969); Elsie Tanner (1970–78)
- Sons: Mark Howard

Alan Patrick Howard was played by Alan Browning. A local businessman, he first appears in December 1969 and quickly makes Elsie Tanner manageress at his salon. Alan makes it clear he is interested in her, and when her old flame Bill Gregory arrives after several years away, Alan makes his move and asks Elsie to move in with him. Elsie agonises over her choice, before turning Bill down. Elsie and Alan later split up, however, when he says he does not want to get married again. Alan leaves the area following the split in March 1970.

In July, Alan makes a shock return and pleads with Elsie to take him back, telling her he is ready to commit. Elsie forgives Alan and the pair marry a couple of weeks later. However, it becomes clear after the wedding that Alan is in serious debt and after returning from their honeymoon Alan gets a rude awakening when rumours of a petition against him start circulating. He is forced to move into Elsie's house and start again while he pays off what he owes. Billy Walker gives Alan a job as a mechanic in his garage in September; Alan is promoted to manager when Billy leaves the area in 1971. He later buys the garage with a loan from his ex-wife Laura.

Alan is tempted in 1971 when Janet Reid makes advances towards him. He tries to turn her down, but she is persistent. When Elsie finds out, Alan denies anything had happened; she believes him, but warns Janet off him anyway. In 1972, despite Elsie's pleas, Alan starts a new venture going into partnership with Jimmy Frazer selling used cars. The workload becomes too much for him to bear and he turns to drink. Quickly falling victim to the addiction, he falls asleep one night after drinking and almost sets fire to the house. Elsie was devastated by his reckless actions, and Alan agrees to terminate the partnership with Jimmy in order to save their marriage and quit the alcohol.

In 1973, Elsie was offered a job in Newcastle and on Alan's advice, she accepted. The Howards moved away, and after tying up loose ends selling the garage back to Billy and renting out the house, Alan last appeared in January 1974. Alan and Elsie later split up and Elsie moved back to Weatherfield in the spring of 1976. They divorced a couple of years later when Alan wanted to marry again.
