= Albert Tatlock =

Fictional character from Coronation Street

- Coronation Street character
- Portrayed by: Jack Howarth
- Duration: 1960–1984
- First appearance: Episode 1; 9 December 1960
- Last appearance: Episode 2380; 23 January 1984
- Created by: Tony Warren
- Introduced by: Stuart Latham
- Book appearances: Coronation Street: The Complete Saga; Coronation Street: Keeping The Home Fires Burning; Coronation Street: The War Years
In-universe information
- Occupation: Town Hall clerk (retired)
- Father: William Tatlock
- Mother: Emmeline Tatlock
- Brothers: Alfred Tatlock
- Wife: Bessie Vickery (backstory)
- Daughters: Beattie Pearson
- Grandsons: Bill Pearson
- Grandfathers: Alfred Tatlock
- Grandmothers: Louisa Tatlock
- Uncles: Horace Duckworth
- Aunts: Mary Osbourne; Ada Broadbent
- Nieces: Joyce Tatlock; Valerie Barlow
- Other relatives: Peter Barlow; Susan Barlow; Ken Barlow

Albert Tatlock is a fictional character on the British ITV television soap opera Coronation Street. Actor Jack Howarth played Albert from 1960 to 1984.

A veteran of World War I, Albert settled back into civilian life by marrying and starting a family. However, his wife Bessie died in 1959 and he retired from his job at the Town Hall the following year, before taking up a new occupation as the street's resident grumpy old man, forever complaining about the struggles of old age and living on the low income from his pension.

Although Albert was never close to his daughter Beattie, he maintained close ties with his brother Alfred's family, particularly his niece Valerie, who married Albert's neighbour Ken Barlow in 1962. With Val's death in 1971 and Beattie's continued absence, Ken eventually moved into No. 1 and took care of Albert in his twilight years until his death in May 1984.

== Storylines ==
Albert is delighted when his niece Valerie (Anne Reid), daughter of his brother Alfred, comes to stay with him, and begins to see neighbour Ken Barlow (William Roache); Albert is even more delighted when the pair decide to get married in 1962. Pleased to have family ties in the street, he is a frequent visitor at No. 9.

Not idle in his retirement, Albert gets a job as a school crossing warden and acquires an allotment from the council to grow his vegetables. In 1965, Albert asks Clara Midgeley (Betty Hardy) to look after his house while he made an extended visit to his daughter Beattie Pearson's (Gabrielle Daye), and upon his return, he soon realises that Clara is interested in him. Clara proposes to Albert, but he turns her down, saying he is too set in his ways.

Money is always a great concern of Albert's. In 1967 he briefly buys items in bulk with Ena Sharples (Violet Carson) to cut costs and later takes a live-in assistant job at the Fusiliers' Museum, working for his old friend Harry Dunscombe. Effie Spicer (Anne Dyson) looks after No. 1 while Albert is living elsewhere. Effie leaves the house abruptly upon Albert's return as he has increased her rent because he hates the decorations she has placed as a surprise for him.

In 1969, Albert finds himself warming up to the idea of remarrying, so he will have someone to spend his old age with. He proposes to Alice Pickins (Doris Hare), who has been pursuing him for nearly a year, however, as the guests gather for the wedding, the vicar is delayed, and Alice deems it a bad sign and decides not to marry Albert after all. Further misfortune comes for Albert in 1971 when Ken and Valerie decide to emigrate. Just as he is coming to terms with their departure, Valerie dies in an accident in the Barlows' maisonette, and a distraught Ken decides to stay in the country. Even though Ken is not a blood relative, Albert has come to accept him as part of his family and eventually lets him lodge at No. 1, although he has made his disapproval that Ken has decided to send his and Val's twins Peter and Susan (Robert and Katie Heaneu) to live in Scotland with Val's parents, Alfred and Edith Tatlock (Clare Kelly) clear.

In the meantime, Albert's financial woes continue. He takes a job as co-caretaker at the local community centre and in 1973 suggests to his friend Minnie Caldwell (Margot Bryant) that they should marry for financial reasons (Minnie is also struggling with money). After months of being engaged, Minnie pushes Albert to set a date for the wedding. However, when her friend Ena points out that as a couple, they would earn less than they would separately, Minnie calls off the engagement. Both are relieved, as they are starting to get on each other's nerves.

Albert celebrates his 80th birthday in August 1975. To his surprise, the neighbours throw a surprise party for him. They have contacted his old regiment who sent along a bugler. In 1976, Albert has a dispute when he wins money at the bingo with Bertha Lumley (Madoline Thomas), as she does not share her winnings with him despite their agreement. Albert is threatened by Bertha's husband Nat (Eric Longworth), so he decides to leave them alone.

Albert is very proud of his war record and takes a dim view of Minnie's friend Handel Gartside (Harry Markham) when he finds out he is a conscientious objector, and even at one point refused to let Handel in his house. In 1980, Albert sells his military medal to go to London for Remembrance Day, to pay tribute to his war friend Monty Shawcross. When Ken sees how upset Albert is that he has sold his medal, he buys it back for him.

In the late 1970s, Albert spends his days taking care of his allotment, though he fears the council will take it from him because of his age. Ken has re-married but is now back at No. 1 after being widowed. However, in 1981, Ken marries for a third time, to Deirdre Langton (Anne Kirkbride). Ken and Deirdre plan to move out although Ken feels an obligation to take care of Albert, as Albert's daughter Beattie continues to visit him only a few times a year. Albert wants to stay in No. 1 but knows that if he leaves the house to Ken and Deirdre in his will it will upset Beattie, so the Barlows decide to buy it from him instead (although Beattie is still upset by the news). Albert agrees to move into the front parlour so that Deirdre's daughter Tracy (Holly Chamarette) can take his room.

Albert Tatlock died of a heart attack while sitting in his chair at 11 am on 14 May 1984, aged 88, after paying a visit to Beattie. His death mirrored the death of the actor who played him, Jack Howarth, who had died in hospital six weeks earlier. In 2014, Albert's medal is featured in a further storyline, when Tracy sells it. Deirdre is furious and demands she gets it back or else she will kick her out of No. 1.

In January 2019, Ken's long-lost son Daniel Osbourne (Rob Mallard) and his wife Sinead (Katie McGlynn) have a baby boy whom they name Bertie, after Albert.
