= Episode 1 (Coronation Street) =

- Coronation Street episode
- Episode no.: Series 1 Episode 1
- Directed by: Derek Bennett
- Written by: Tony Warren
- Production code: Stuart Latham
- Original air date: 9 December 1960
- Running time: 25 minutes

Episode chronology
← Previous —	Next → "Episode 2"

Map of ITV availability in 1960. The blue names indicate weekday franchise holders; Coronation Street was originally aired on Fridays.

Episode 1 of the British television soap opera Coronation Street was broadcast live on ITV on 9 December 1960, and was broadcast in black-and-white. Episode 2 was video taped shortly after the airing.

== Plot ==
The series first introduces Florrie Lindley (Betty Alberge), who has bought up the local Corner Shop from Elsie Lappin (Maudie Edwards), who has now retired after working there for many years. Elsie stays on in order to show Florrie the ropes; warning her about some of the residents on the Street.

At No. 11, Elsie Tanner (Pat Phoenix) berates her 18-year-old son Dennis (Philip Lowrie), who has recently been released from prison. She wants him to find work, which is not easy for him because of his criminal record, but she accuses him of not trying hard enough. Because he went to prison for theft, she also accuses him of stealing two shillings from her purse, which he denies. Elsie tells Dennis that she wishes they were more like the Barlow family, who apparently do not argue all the time.

At No. 3, 21-year-old student Ken Barlow (William Roache) is eating dinner with his parents, Frank (Frank Pemberton) and Ida (Noel Dyson). Frank starts accusing Ken of being too snobbish and being embarrassed by his working class family, but Ken defends himself, and Ida tries to keep the peace. Ken states that he is taking his middle class girlfriend, Susan Cunningham (Patricia Shakesby), to the Imperial Hotel, which Frank angrily forbids, as Ida works as a cleaner in the kitchens there and he does not like the thought of Ken spending money in the same establishment where his mother works hard to earn it. Ken's younger brother David (Alan Rothwell) arrives home from work and tells his father that his bicycle has got a puncture, which Frank is more than happy to repair. David sits at the table and asks Ken what is wrong and Ken tells him about the argument between him and Frank, which David is not surprised about. The two brothers seem to get on fine despite their differences.

Ken heads to The Rovers Return Inn, run by Annie Walker (Doris Speed). Ken orders cigarettes, while Dennis enters and orders a half pint of mild. Annie seems to approve of Ken more than Dennis. Dennis begins to wind up Ken about him being smart and being at university. When Dennis cannot afford cigarettes because of his drink, Ken gives him a pack. Annie disapproves of this, telling Ken not to waste his sympathy on Dennis, and that it is Elsie she feels sorry for.

Meanwhile, Elsie's daughter Linda Cheveski (Anne Cunningham) comes to visit Elsie. She reveals she was the one who took the two shillings from Elsie’s purse and also informs her that she has separated from her husband Ivan (Ernst Walder) and is planning a divorce, but refuses to explain why. Elsie decides to let Linda stay at No. 11. At the Corner Shop, Florrie serves her first customer, Ena Sharples (Violet Carson), the live-in caretaker of the nearby Glad Tidings Mission Hall, who fiercely questions her about her background and religious values. Ken goes to Number 1 to visit his friend, pensioner Albert Tatlock (Jack Howarth). Ida comes to inform Ken that Susan has arrived at No. 3. They go home, where Ken is relieved to find out that Susan likes his family.

== Characters and cast ==
As this is the first episode, this is also the first appearance of these characters:

- Maudie Edwards as Elsie Lappin
- Betty Alberge as Florrie Lindley
- Anne Cunningham as Linda Cheveski
- Pat Phoenix as Elsie Tanner
- Philip Lowrie as Dennis Tanner
- Frank Pemberton as Frank Barlow
- Noel Dyson as Ida Barlow
- William Roache as Ken Barlow
- Alan Rothwell as David Barlow
- Doris Speed as Annie Walker
- Violet Carson as Ena Sharples
- Jack Howarth as Albert Tatlock
- Patricia Shakesby as Susan Cunningham

== Subsequent showings ==
The episode is often aired when the soap reaches an important milestone in its history. In this regard it was broadcast in December 1990 when the soap reached its 30th anniversary. The first episode was shown again at 7:00pm on 9 December 2000 on the evening of the show's 40th anniversary, on the evening on the 50th anniversary celebrations on 6 December 2010, then once again on ITV3 in the week of the programme's 60th anniversary celebrations on 7 December 2020. The episode is available commercially via digital download from iTunes and DVD. The complete first seven episodes, all from 1960 including a bonus 1961 episode, as only seven episodes were aired in the debut year, is also available on Region 2 DVD, included in Network's Coronation Street: The Best of 1960–1969, a 10 disc box set released on 31 July 2006 and subsequently reissued on 5 September 2011.

The episode was also included on the 50th Golden Anniversary DVD boxset by ITV Studios Global Entertainment included with other episodes and specials. These include Corrie Controversies, The Stars Of Coronation Street; 50 Years, 50 Classic Characters; The First Colour Episode and the 40th anniversary live episode from 2000.
