= No Frills (TV series) =

1988 British television series

No Frills is a television sitcom broadcast on BBC1 in 1988, and consisted of 7 episodes. It starred Kathy Staff as Molly Bickerstaff, a recently widowed woman who moves from Oldham to live in London with her divorced daughter Kate (Belinda Sinclair) and goth granddaughter Suzy (Katharine Schlesinger).
