= Kathy Staff =

English actress (1928–2008)

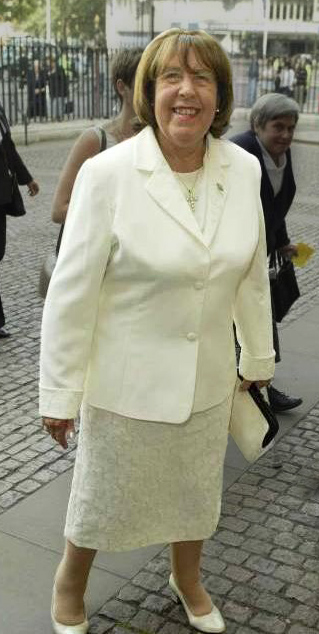
- Kathy Staff
- Born: Minnie Higginbottom; 12 July 1928; Dukinfield, Cheshire, England
- Died: 13 December 2008 (aged 80); Ashton-under-Lyne, Greater Manchester, England
- Resting place: Dukinfield Cemetery and Crematorium
- Occupation: Actress
- Years active: 1946–2008
- Spouse: John Staff (m. 1951)
- Children: 2

Kathy Staff (born Minnie Higginbottom; 12 July 1928 – 13 December 2008) was an English actress known for her work on British television. She was best known for her portrayal of Nora Batty in Last of the Summer Wine, the longest running sitcom in the world.

== Career ==
=== Early career ===
She began her acting career with touring repertory companies in 1946, changing her name to Katherine Brant. After she married John Staff in 1951, she adopted the surname as her stage name, becoming Kathy Staff. She retired from the stage at this point to raise her family, but started working as an extra for Granada Television in Manchester in the 1960s. In her autobiography, Staff revealed herself to be a Conservative, and noted that she had once stood as an election candidate for the party. This appears to have been in 1971, when a Ms. M. Staff contested the Central ward in the Municipal Borough of Dukinfield. The seat was comfortably held by Labour, with the Liberals beating all three Conservative candidates, the last-placed of whom was Staff.

=== Last of the Summer Wine ===
Staff was best known for her role as one of the main characters, Nora Batty, in the long-running BBC sitcom Last of the Summer Wine. She played Nora Batty from the pilot episode in 1973 until 2008, the year she died from a brain tumour, totalling 245 episodes.

Following the death of actor Bill Owen on 12 July 1999, Staff left the show briefly. She stated in interviews that things were not the same since his death, and her heart was no longer in it. She later returned to the show, remaining until her death in 2008.

=== Television ===
Staff had a regular role as Doris Luke in the popular ATV soap opera, Crossroads from 1978 to 1984 and 2001 to 2002. Her other television roles included Coronation Street as Vera Hopkins, No Frills as Molly Bickerstaff, Open All Hours as Mrs Blewett, Dawson's Weekly and The Benny Hill Show. She appeared in a television version of Separate Tables in 1983.

She was the subject of This Is Your Life in 1984 when she was surprised by Eamonn Andrews while shopping in Harrods. She also appeared on Lily Savage's Blankety Blank, plus a brief appearance in Follyfoot.

=== Theatre ===
Her theatre roles included Lady Bracknell in The Importance of Being Earnest at Birmingham Rep, Madame Arcati and Mrs Malaprop in touring productions of Blithe Spirit and The Rivals respectively and a touring production of the comedy Sailor, Beware!, as well as two West End plays: the farce Two into One and comedy When We Are Married, and many pantomimes.

=== Films ===
She appeared in A Kind of Loving (1962) as Thora Hird's character's neighbour, as well as The Family Way (1966), The Dresser (1983), Camille (1984), Little Dorrit (1988), and Mary Reilly (1996).

== Illness and death ==
Staff died on 13 December 2008, at the Willow Wood Hospice in Ashton-under-Lyne, aged 80, with her husband John at her bedside, after a brain tumour was diagnosed earlier in the year.

Her death was announced on 14 December. Her funeral took place at St Mark's Church, Dukinfield, where she was a lifelong member and sang in the choir. She is commemorated in a memorial screen at the church. Her remains are interred at Dukinfield Cemetery.

== Television roles ==
Year	Title	Role
1969	Castle Haven	Lorna Everitt
1970	Queenie's Castle	Mrs Blakely
1973	Hadleigh	Mrs Brennan
1973–2001; 2002–2008	Last of the Summer Wine	Nora Batty; 243 episodes
1973–1975	Coronation Street	Vera Hopkins
1975	Emmerdale	Winnie Purvis
1976–1981	Open All Hours	Mrs Blewett
1978–1984; 2001–2002	Crossroads	Doris Luke
1983–1986	The Benny Hill Show	Various
1988	No Frills	Molly Bickerstaff
