= Clare Kelly =

English actress (1922–2001)

- Born: 25 February 1922; Manchester, England
- Died: 18 February 2001 (aged 78); Bath, Somerset, England
- Occupation: Actress

Clare Kelly (25 February 1922 – 18 February 2001) was an English actress who worked primarily in television. She was known for roles in films such as Georgy Girl (1966), And Soon the Darkness (1970), The Fourth Protocol (1987). TV roles included Gideon's Way S1E25 (1964), Valerie Barlow's mother Edith Tatlock in long-running ITV soap opera Coronation Street (1969), as Connie Wagstaffe in The Cuckoo Waltz (1975), Mrs. Sergeant in Lady Killers (1980), Mrs. Rothwell in A Kind of Loving (1982), and as Violet Littlejohn in Rep (1982). Kelly also appeared in several roles in The Bill.
