= Harold Goldblatt =

British actor (1899–1982)

- Goldblatt in Children of the Damned, 1964
- Born: Israel Goldblatt; 5 July 1899; Manchester, Lancashire, England
- Died: 22 March 1982 (aged 82); London, England
- Years active: 1920s–1982

Harold Goldblatt (born Israel Goldblatt, 5 July 1899 – 22 March 1982) was a British actor, theatre director and theatre producer, born in Manchester, but mostly raised in Belfast.

== Career ==
Goldblatt was born in Manchester, England, to Russian Jewish parents, and subsequently moved with his family to Belfast, where he grew up. He married Leah (Lillie) Rosenzweig. They had two children, a daughter Joan, and a son Ivan. He founded the Jewish Institute Dramatic Society, and remained a prominent member after their merger with the Northern Ireland Players and the Ulster Theatre in 1940 to form the Group Theatre. He left the Group Theatre in 1959, and in 1963 he formed the Ulster Theatre Company, which included a number of former Group members.

In the 1950s, Goldblatt was frequently heard on BBC Radio as well as appearing in films and television. In film, he played Benjamin Guggenheim in A Night to Remember (1958), about the sinking of the Titanic, and on television, he played Concepta Riley's father Sean in four episodes of Coronation Street, Dr. O'Connell in Pathfinders in Space in 1961, and Professor Dale in the Doctor Who serial Frontier in Space in 1973; the latter two were both written by Malcolm Hulke. He also appeared in the TV series The Persuaders! (episode 2, The Gold Napoleon).

In 1966, Goldblatt received an honorary degree from Queen's University Belfast. He died in London, where he was working on the film Yentl, on 22 March 1982, aged 82. His documents and theatrical materials are archived at the Linen Hall Library, Belfast.

== Filmography ==
- Jacqueline (1956) – Schoolmaster
- The Rising of the Moon (1957) – Barney Donigan – farmer
- Rooney (1958) – Police Inspector
- A Night to Remember (1958) – Benjamin Guggenheim
- The Siege of Sidney Street (1960) – Hersh
- Pathfinders in Space (1960) – Dr. O'Connell
- Francis of Assisi (1961) – Bernard
- The Big Gamble (1961) – The Priest
- Coronation Street (1961) – Sean Riley
- The Inspector (1962) – Dr. Mitropoulos
- The Reluctant Saint (1962) – Father Giovanni
- Nine Hours to Rama (1963) – Selvrag Prahlad
- The Mind Benders (1963) – Professor Sharpey
- The Running Man (1963) – Tom Webster
- The Scarlet Blade (1963) – Jacob
- Children of the Damned (1964) – Harib
- Young Cassidy (1965) – Abbey Theatre Manager
- The Reptile (1966) – The Solicitor

"Sergeant Cork" (1966) - The Captain

- The 25th Hour (1967) – Isaac Nagy
- Sunday Bloody Sunday (1971) – Daniel's Father
- The Persuaders! (1971) – Maurice Devigne
- Something to Hide (1972) – Dibbick
- Doctor Who (In the serial "Frontier in Space") (1973) – Professor Dale
- The Abdication (1974) – Pinamonti
