= Ray Langton =

Fictional character from Coronation Street

- Coronation Street character
- Portrayed by: Neville Buswell
- Duration: 1966; 1968–1978; 2005
- First appearance: 21 February 1966
- Last appearance: 10 April 2005
- Introduced by: Peter Eckersley (1966); Michael Cox (1968); Tony Wood (2005)
- Spin-off appearances: Viva Las Vegas! (1997)
In-universe information
- Occupation: Wine Bar Owner; Pub landlord
- Mother: Mary Langton
- Sisters: Janice Langton
- Wife: Deirdre Hunt (1975–1978); Mrs Langton (1979–2000)
- Daughters: Tracy Barlow
- Granddaughters: Amy Barlow

Ray Langton is a fictional character from the British ITV soap opera Coronation Street, played by Neville Buswell.

== Development ==
Ray Langton's departure in 1978 came due to Neville Buswell quitting acting and later, leaving to work in Las Vegas. However, he returned in 2005 for a brief stint, 27 years since he portrayed the character.

Neville Buswell is the fourth cast member to have the longest break in Coronation Street, which is a 27-year absence from 1978 to 2005. As of 2011, Philip Lowrie, who played Dennis Tanner, has the record for the longest break between appearances in Coronation Street, having been absent for 43 years.

== Storylines ==
Ray Langton is born at Number 2, Gas Street. Throughout his childhood, he is often in trouble with the police. An ex-borstal boy, Ray has a reputation as a troublemaker. He first appears in the Street in 1966, but Len Fairclough (Peter Adamson) sends him away after Ray threatens Lucille Hewitt (Jennifer Moss). Nevertheless, Ray returns two years later. Len gives him a job at his building firm and invites him to move into his bachelor pad at No.9. Ray hopes to start his own business, but settles for a partnership with Len and Jerry Booth (Graham Haberfield). Ray's younger sister, Janice (Paula Wilcox), visits briefly in 1969.

Ray, a womaniser, is involved with many women while living in the Street, including Sandra Butler (Patricia Fuller), Audrey Fleming (Gillian McCann), Vicki Bright (Clare Sutcliffe) and Sue Silcock (Angela Scoular).

In 1975, he marries the yard's secretary, Deirdre Hunt (Anne Kirkbride), and they move into No.5; their daughter, Tracy Langton (Christabel Finch), is born in 1977. His roving eye leads him into an affair with waitress Janice Stubbs (Angela Bruce). Deirdre finds out, so he ends the affair, and makes plans to move to the Netherlands for a new life. He wants Deirdre, and Tracy, to come with him. Deirdre initially agrees, but changes her mind at the last minute, and Ray leaves the street on his own. Ray keeps in touch, sending Tracy presents, but this dwindles over the years. Eventually, he contacts Deirdre, asking for a divorce as his new partner is pregnant with his child. Ray divorces his second wife sometime around 2000.

When he discovers he has stomach cancer in 2005, he returns to Weatherfield so he can make amends with Tracy. Arriving on Ken and Deirdre's wedding day, he hits baby Amy Barlow (Rebecca Pike)'s pram. He meets Deirdre, Blanche Hunt (Maggie Jones), and Ken Barlow (William Roache), at the hospital and realises that Amy is his granddaughter, and Tracy is her mother. Ray informs them of his terminal stomach cancer, and that he has divorced his Dutch wife. He stays with Emily Bishop (Eileen Derbyshire). Tracy softens towards Ray. He attends Ken and Deirdre's wedding, and wishes the couple well. During the reception in the Rovers Return, Ray dies of his illness, much to Tracy's distress.

== Other appearances ==
In 1972, Ray, together with Jerry Booth and Fred Gee, appeared in a spin off from Coronation Street entitled Rest Assured.

The premise of the series was to follow the comic misfortunes of Street characters Ray Langton and Jerry Booth in the role of insurance salesmen and premium collectors. Part of their customer round is in Norville House, a block of flats in Weatherfield.

However the series only got as far as the recording of a half-hour pilot episode under the title Lift Off.

Ray made a brief cameo appearance in Viva Las Vegas!, a VHS spin-off written by Russell T. Davies and released in 1998, as Buswell was living in Las Vegas at the time. In the storyline Ray is working as a barman and unexpectedly meets Vera Duckworth (Liz Dawn), who is holidaying there. When Vera brings him up to date on some of the things that have happened in Weatherfield since his departure, Ray assumes she must be joking and responds by telling her he's now married to a man and is hiding from his evil twin.
