= List of Coronation Street characters introduced in 1967 =

Coronation Street is a British soap opera first broadcast on 9 December 1960. The following is a list of characters that first appeared in 1967, by order of first appearance.

== Steve Tanner ==
Steve Tanner
- Coronation Street character
- Portrayed by: Paul Maxwell
- First appearance: 3 May 1967
- Last appearance: 27 December 1967
- Introduced by: H.V. Kershaw
In-universe information
- Occupation: Soldier
- Mother: Emmeline Tanner
- Wife: Le Lan Tanner; Elsie Tanner (1967–1968)

Stephen Edward "Steve" Tanner, played by Paul Maxwell, was an old flame of Elsie Tanner's from the war. He returned to Weatherfield in 1967 and rekindled his relationship with Elsie. They married that year and moved back to Steve's hometown in America. In 1968 Elsie returned alone saying her marriage was over. Steve followed Elsie back to the Street but he was pushed down a flight of stairs and killed by Joe Donnelli.

== Joe Donnelli ==
Joe Donnelli
- Coronation Street character
- Portrayed by: Shane Rimmer
- Duration: 1967–1968, 1970
- First appearance: 21 August 1967; Episode 697
- Last appearance: 21 December 1970; Episode 103

Joe Donnelli, played by Shane Rimmer, is a former American GI. Joe is dealing with gambling debts and blames Steve Tanner for it, and in his idea of revenge, he pushes Steve down a flight of stairs, killing him. For nearly two years Joe gets away with the murder when the chief suspect is Len Fairclough. On 12 December 1970, Joe returns to the Street and kidnaps Minnie Caldwell but his plan backfires when he is cornered by Irma Barlow, so he holds her hostage in the corner shop and confesses to murdering Steve. Irma manages to escape and Joe goes to No. 5 Coronation Street and holds Minnie and Bobby hostage. Later Stan Ogden takes Minnie's place, but Stan is unaware that Joe is armed with a gun and is forced to sing Christmas carols to Joe. When the police arrive and surround the house, Joe commits suicide by shooting himself after realising there is no escape.

== Ernest Bishop ==
Ernest Bishop
- Coronation Street character
- Portrayed by: Stephen Hancock
- Duration: 1967, 1969–1978
- First appearance: 6 September 1967
- Last appearance: 11 January 1978
- Introduced by: Jack Rosenthal (1967); H.V. Kershaw (1969)
In-universe information
- Other names: Ernest Gordon Bishop
- Occupation: Photographer; Wages clerk
- Father: George Bishop
- Mother: Caroline Bishop
- Sisters: Edie Burgess
- Wife: Emily Nugent (1972–1978)
- Nieces: Freda Burgess

Ernest Bishop, played by Stephen Hancock, made his first screen appearance on 6 September 1967.

Ernest had been educated at Weatherfield Grammar School, and, despite being very academically inclined, he refused a place at Manchester Victoria University, in order to run his own photographic business. Operating under his "professional" name Gordon Bishop, he first appeared at Elsie Tanner's wedding as official photographer in 1967.

In 1969, Emily Nugent (Eileen Derbyshire) began working at Ernest's camera shop. Emily and Ernest had many things in common, not least firm religious beliefs (Ernest was a lay preacher), and they began a relationship. After a long courtship, they married on Easter Monday 1972 and moved into No. 3 Coronation Street together. The Bishops were unable to have children of their own but fostered two children at Christmas 1974, which helped mend a rough patch in their marriage.

In 1976, Ernest was unable to afford the rent on his camera shop and put his business into liquidation. Emily, however, was a tower of strength, insisting that she go out to work and be the bread winner. Ernest became the Street's first househusband; making him the butt of jokes from the other men on the Street, but Emily was proud of him.

Ernest was able to make some spare money by playing the piano in pubs and night clubs —he was accompanist for Rita Littlewood (Barbara Knox) at the Gatsby Club—but, despite being grateful for the money, Emily drew the line when Ernie played the piano for a stripper, who came round to their house to practice her act. Ernest's fortunes changed when factory owner Mike Baldwin (Johnny Briggs) offered him a job as wages clerk at Baldwin's Casuals. Mike's trust in Ernest effectively made him a second-in-command. One day in January 1978, when drawing up the workers' wage packets, two young men, one—Tommo—armed with a shotgun, burst into the office and demanded Ernest hand over the money. Ernest obliged, but Mike entered the office and accidentally knocked Tommo's arm, discharging the gun and shooting Ernest in the chest. He was rushed to hospital but later died. The shock of hearing what had happened made Emily faint in the Street. The two criminals were later apprehended and sentenced to life imprisonment.

28 years later, in 2006, Emily became friends with churchgoer Ed Jackson (Chris Walker). They became friends and bonded over their strong religious faith until Ed revealed his real name to be Thomas Jackson, the man who killed Ernest. Jackson claimed he had served his sentence and become a born-again Christian and wanted forgiveness from Emily for Ernest's murder. This caused Emily to have a crisis of faith as she couldn't bring herself to forgive him. However, upon learning Jackson was suicidal, she told him she forgave him and gave him one of Ernest's old cameras.

== Robert Croft ==
Robert Croft, played by Martin Shaw, made his first screen appearance on 13 December 1967. The role as "hippy student" Robert marked Shaw's television debut.

Robert was the leader of a hippie commune. When Lucille Hewitt (Jennifer Moss) develops a crush on Robert, she decides to join the hippies. Lucille asks Dennis Tanner (Philip Lowrie) to throw a New Year's party at 11 Coronation Street and Robert and the hippies come along. They stay and begin squatting in the house, causing a ruckus among the Street's other residents. Eventually Annie Walker (Doris Speed) reports the hippies to the landlord, who demands their removal and Robert decides that it is time for them to leave.
