= Betty Alberge =

English actress (1922–1991)

- Born: 22 January 1922; Manchester, Lancashire, England
- Died: 18 May 1991 (aged 69); Stoke-on-Trent, Staffordshire, England
- Occupation: Actress
- Spouse: Rupert Marshall (m. 1944)
- Children: Christine

Betty Alberge (22 January 1922 – 18 May 1991) was an English theatre, radio and television actress, with an extensive career which ran from the late 1930s to the 1980s. She was best known for her roles as Florrie Lindley in Coronation Street, in which she appeared between 1960 and 1965, and as Edna Cross in Brookside between 1983 and 1985.

== Early life ==
Alberge was born in Manchester, Lancashire on 22 January 1922, and received her formal education at Fallowfield Central School for Girls in Manchester. Whilst at school she became interested in acting after performing in a school theatrical production of Maurice Maeterlinck's The Death of Tintagiles with school friend Patricia Pilkington, later to become known as Pat Phoenix and play Elsie Tanner in Coronation Street.

== Acting career ==
After initial training to be an actress at the Repertory School of Acting in Manchester, Alberge completed her training with the Colwyn Bay Repertory Company, at the New Rialto Theatre in Colwyn Bay. During World War II she was employed as a performer with ENSA. In the 1950s she worked with a wide variety dramatic productions in theatre and with the British Broadcasting Corporation.

=== Coronation Street ===
Alberge was one of the original cast of the television serial drama Coronation Street, playing the character Florrie Lindley from episode one, on Friday 9 December 1960, until 1965 when she left the series. The show's creator, Tony Warren, originally wrote the part of Ida Barlow for Alberge, but after the first audition, he cast her in the role as shopkeeper. Alberge had the distinction of having the second line in the first scene of the first episode: "It's funny having me own name over me own shop, Florrie Lindley". The character let customers believe she was a widow when, in fact, she was estranged from her husband Norman. Under new producer Tim Aspinall, Alberge was written out of the serial in June 1965, after almost 300 episodes, when her character emigrated to Canada with her husband Norman.

=== Later work ===
After she left Coronation Street, Alberge continued to perform in theatre, and regularly appeared as a supporting character actress in television dramas and light entertainment shows from the 1960s to the 1980s, including Z-Cars, the Ken Dodd Show, Crown Court, Rentaghost, Odd Man Out and Juliet Bravo. In November 1983, she joined the cast of Brookside, playing pensioner Edna Cross. She remained in this role until the character's death in 1985, after just over 100 episodes. When Alberge learned that her character was to be written out of the soap, she said "Life goes on."

Her last on screen performance was in 1986 in an episode of the BBC's Casualty.

== Personal life ==
Alberge married Rupert Marshall in Manchester in 1944. The couple had one daughter, Christine, in 1947.

== Death ==
Alberge died on 18 May 1991, aged 69, in Stoke-on-Trent, Staffordshire.

== Filmography ==
=== Film ===
Year	Title	Role	Type
1959	Post and Pheasant	Mrs Throttle	TV movie
1960	Coronation Street: First Dry Run	Florrie Lindley	TV movie
1966	Second Honeymoon	Agnes Bowden	TV movie
1971	Crucible of Terror	Dorothy Clare	Feature film
1972	Disciple of Death	Dorothy	Feature film
1980	Exchange and Divide	Mrs Carr	Feature film

=== Television ===
Year	Title	Role	Type
1958	Television Playwright	Lucy Parkinson	TV play series, season 1, episode 14: "Red Rose for Ransom"
1958	ITV Play of the Week	Mrs Broome	TV play series, season 4, episode 1: "Mary Broome"
1959	The Ken Dodd Show		TV series, 1 episode
1960	BBC Sunday-Night Play	Mrs Doyle	TV play series, season 1, episode 17: "Twentieth Century Theatre: Love on the Dole"
1960	Knight Errant Limited	Receptionist / Mrs Rigby-Jones	TV series, season 2, 2 episodes
1960–65	Coronation Street	Florrie Lindley	TV series, 288 episodes
1968	The Wednesday Play	Ivy	TV play series, season 8, episode 3: "The Gorge"
1969	Nearest and Dearest	Mrs Rowbottom	TV series, season 2, episode 2: "Wish You Were Here"
1969	Softly Softly: Task Force	Mrs Dawkins	TV series, season 1, episode 1: "Arrival"
1969–72	ITV Playhouse	Mrs Milner / Marge	TV play series, 2 episodes
1969–76	Z-Cars	Various characters	TV series, 6 episodes
1970	Francis Durbridge's Paul Temple	Joan Langford	TV series, season 2, episode 13: "Re-take"
1971	Public Eye	Mrs Greene	TV series, season 5, episode 8: "Who Wants to Be Told Bad News?"
1971	The Fenn Street Gang	Mrs Mathews	TV series, season 1, episode 12: "Who Was That Lady?"
1973	Harriet's Back in Town	Mrs Henry	TV series, season 1, 2 episodes
1973	Crown Court	Mrs Winifred Cummings	TV series, season 2, episode 141: "A Message to Ireland: Part 3"
1974	A Raging Calm	Mrs Baxter	Miniseries, episode 6: "Missing Persons"
1974	Zodiac	Paula Sutton	TV series, season 1, episode 2: "The Cool Aquarian"
1974	Marked Personal	Mabel Green	TV series, season 1, 2 episodes
1974	Late Night Drama	Mother	TV series, season 1, episode 2: "A Brisk Dip Sagaciously Considered"
1974	Father Brown	Mrs Gow	TV series, season 1, episode 11: "The Head of Caesar"
1975	Rooms	Miss Gardner	TV series, season 1, episodes 18–19
1975	Rule Britannia!	Landlady	TV series, season 1, episode 6: "The Lost Weekend"
1975–79	Play for Today	Mum / Mrs Longstaff	TV play series, 2 episodes
1976–79	Rentaghost	Mrs Sheila Mumford	TV series, 17 episodes
1977	Centre Play	Lil	TV play series, season 6, episode 3: "Kipper"
1977	London Belongs to Me	Mrs Boon	TV series, season 1, 6 episodes
1977	Odd Man Out	Auntie Cissie	TV series, season 1, episode 1: "A Chip Off the Old Block"
1978	Parables	Mrs Shoppe	TV series, season 1, episode 4: "Another Weekend"
1978	Robin’s Nest	Cynthia Henderson	TV series, season 3, episode 6: "Once Two is Three"
1979	House of Caradus	Mrs Harris	TV series, season 1, episode 7: "Long Shadow"
1979	A Moment in Time	Rose	TV series, 3 episodes
1981	Funny Man	Mrs Gibson	TV series, season 1, episode 13: "Trumpet Voluntary"
1981	Lady Killers	Margaret Crossley	TV series, season 2, episode 3: "Perfect Husband"
1981	Angels	Mrs Marrit	TV series, season 7, episodes 15–18
1981–82	Juliet Bravo	Eunice Prebble / Mrs Webster	TV series, 2 episodes
1982	Never the Twain	Customer	TV series, season 2, episode 6: "The More We Are Together"
1983	Mr Right	Mrs Grover	TV series, season 1, episodes 1–4
1983–85	Brookside	Edna Cross	TV series, 103 episodes
1986	Casualty	Mrs Davies	TV series, season 1, episode 8: "Crazies" (final on-screen performance)
