= Lucille Hewitt =

Fictional character from Coronation Street

- Coronation Street character
- Portrayed by: Jennifer Moss
- Duration: 1960–1974
- First appearance: 21 December 1960; Episode 4
- Last appearance: 1 July 1974; Episode 1404
- Created by: Tony Warren
- Introduced by: Tony Warren
- Book appearances: Coronation Street: The Complete Saga
In-universe information
- Father: Harry Hewitt
- Mother: Lizzie Hewitt
- Stepmother: Concepta Riley
- Half-brothers: Christopher Hewitt
- Grandfathers: Thomas Hewitt
- Grandmothers: Mary Hewitt
- Aunts: Alice Burgess

Lucille Hewitt is a fictional character from the British ITV soap opera Coronation Street, played by Jennifer Moss. Created by Tony Warren as one of Coronation Street's original characters, at eleven years old Lucille was the show's only child character upon its inception and first appeared in the episode broadcast on 21 December 1960.

Daughter of widowed bus conductor Harry Hewitt (Ivan Beavis), Lucille spent several years in an orphanage in her youth, but occasionally visited her father. When Harry married again in 1961, this time to barmaid Concepta Riley (Doreen Keogh), Lucille was able to return home but took an instant disliking to her stepmother. The following year, Concepta gave birth to a half-brother for Lucille, Christopher Hewitt (Stephen Ward). When Christopher was kidnapped while in his sister's care, Lucille received the blame, which strengthened the hatred between Lucille and Concepta. In 1964, Harry and Concepta moved to Ireland alongside Christopher; however, Lucille refused to follow them, and ended up being fostered by local landlords Jack (Arthur Leslie) and Annie Walker (Doris Speed).

Both of Lucille's father figures died in the years that followed, with Harry being crushed to death in 1967 and Jack suffering a heart-attack in 1970. Another loss for Lucille came when she was jilted by her fiancée Gordon Clegg (Bill Kenwright), and Lucille longed to escape Annie's strictly-run household. Over the years, Lucille and Concepta mended their relationship, and in 1974 Lucille joined her and Christopher in Ireland, never to return.

== Development ==
=== Creation ===
One of Coronation Street's original characters conceived by Tony Warren, the character of Lucille existed as far back as the initial conception of the show, when Coronation Street was known as Florizel Street, although at this time she was named Janice. Jennifer Moss made her debut as Lucille in the second dry run, alongside her onscreen father Harry Hewitt (Ivan Beavis). Due to being four foot eleven, Moss could pass for eleven years old, though she was nearly sixteen when Coronation Street premiered on 9 December 1960. In her early years, Lucille was portrayed as an impressionable young schoolgirl who had a difficult relationship with her stepmother, Concepta Riley (Doreen Keogh). Four years older than her character, Moss related to the troubles Lucille went through as she got older: "If you're a teenager, a teenage rebel is quite easy to play because we've all gone through sort of the stroppy bit."

As she was a minor when the programme first started, Moss's appearances were initially restricted. This was explained by Lucille living in an orphanage following the death of her mother. She made 29 appearances in 1961, up to November of that year, when the Equity actors' strike began, leaving Moss unable to sign a new contract until industrial action ended the following April. During this absence, Lucille was still living at 7 Coronation Street and would be mentioned occasionally to keep her alive in viewers' minds. Lucille was the first regular character to return after the strike was over, re-appearing in Episode 142 on 23 April 1962.

=== Departure ===
Moss successfully battled alcoholism in the 1980s, which was the reason underlying her being sacked from Coronation Street for bad behaviour by then-producer Susi Hush in 1974. Moss stated that she drank to numb the pain she felt after the death of her father, Reg. In an interview with the Evening Times in 1979, Moss, then living in a three-apartment house in Wigan, found for her by the local Social Works Department when she was homeless, Moss said: "My youngest daughter, Sarah, is only three years old and is mentally handicapped... while I was pregnant I was drinking all the time. I will go to my grave with this damage to my child on my conscience." Her eldest daughter, Naomi (like Sarah) was taken into care, and her baby boy had died when he was three days old in 1976.

== Storylines ==
Lucille runs away from the orphanage in December 1960 and finds her way back home. Her father, Harry Hewitt (Ivan Beavis), gives in to her pleas and arranges for her to stay for the holidays. Ultimately, Lucille is allowed to return permanently from the orphanage when her aunt, Alice Burgess (Avis Bunnage), agrees to move in to look after her niece while her father is away working. However, the pair do not get on, and Alice's stay is a short one.

Harry marries barmaid Concepta Riley (Doreen Keogh) in 1961, and the pair have a baby boy Christopher Hewitt (Stephen Ward) on 6 August the following year. Lucille is initially jealous of the baby because of the attention he gets, and does not like the adjustments she has to make to accommodate the new arrival. She feels second-best to Christopher, and that she is losing the father who adores her to his new family.

Lucille briefly runs away from home, but is persuaded to return by Ena Sharples (Violet Carson). When she returns, the Hewitts plan a party to celebrate Harry and Concepta's first anniversary. Whilst Christopher is in Lucille's care, she goes away for a moment, and when she returns, he is gone. Lucille is suspected by the police of having an active part in Christopher's disappearance because of her jealousy towards him. Christopher is later found, having been kidnapped by Joan Akers (Anna Cropper).

Concepta is always wanting Harry to move the family to Ireland; in 1963, Harry concedes and for a moment the family looks set to leave Weatherfield. Lucille begs her father to change his mind, and only the issue of Lucille's schooling makes him decide to stay. A year later, Concepta presses Harry on the issue again, and this time he obliges. Lucille, however, is adamant that she is staying in Weatherfield to finish her exams. She moves in with Jack (Arthur Leslie) and Annie Walker (Doris Speed) in the Rovers Return. At one point, Concepta asks Lucille to consider moving to Ireland until she turns 21, but Harry is fine with her staying behind.

Unfortunately, later that day Harry is crushed to death while repairing a car. Lucille consequently stays in Ireland for a while with Concepta. Upon her return, she falls in love with Gordon Clegg (Bill Kenwright). Tired of their parents' interference, the couple attempt to elope to Gretna Green, but miss their train. The marriage is cancelled at the last minute when Gordon jilts Lucille and leaves to work in London as an accountant.

In 1974, Gordon returns for Maggie Clegg (Irene Sutcliffe)'s wedding. To avoid seeing him, Lucille goes to Ireland to visit her stepmother and half-brother. She never returns to Weatherfield.
