= Jennifer Moss (actress) =

English actress and singer

- Born: Jennifer Victoria Moss; 10 January 1945; Wigan, Lancashire, England
- Died: 29 September 2006 (aged 61); Dunfermline, Fife, Scotland
- Occupations: Actress, singer
- Years active: 1960–1997
- Known for: Lucille Hewitt (Coronation Street)
- Children: 3

Jennifer Victoria Moss (10 January 1945 – 29 September 2006) was an English actress and singer from Wigan, Greater Manchester . She was best known for her role as Lucille Hewitt on the long-running British soap opera Coronation Street, which she starred in from 1960 to 1974.

== Early career ==
Moss first achieved fame as a twelve-year-old, as one of the child actors on the BBC's light entertainment programme Children's Hour. It was there that she first came to the attention of actor and screenwriter Tony Warren, who would create Coronation Street. Moss moved into television in the early 1960s, and appeared in June Evening and Magnolia Street for BBC Television. At the age of 15, she joined Coronation Street in episode four as the programme's first wildchild Lucille Hewitt, a role she played until she left in 1974, after 14 years and 756 episodes.

== Music career/discography ==
In 1961, during the Equity strike, Moss used her freedom away from the Street to concentrate on other projects. She appeared in a West End musical, and made her debut on the big screen when she co-starred with David Hemmings, Veronica Hurst, John Pike and Joan Newell in the beat film Live It Up! (1963), singing "Please Let It Happen To Me". Her debut single, "Hobbies", produced by Joe Meek, failed to make the UK charts, and her music career fizzled out. She recorded a number of other songs, which remained unreleased until 1996, when a CD compilation, Let's Go With Joe Meek's Girls, was released.

The complete list of songs that Moss recorded with Meek is as follows:

- "Hobbies" / "Big Boys" - (Columbia DB 7063, June 1963)
- "Please Don't Say Goodbye"
- "Please Let It Happen To Me" (from Live It Up!)
- "When My Boy Comes Marching Home"

After the Equity strike, Moss returned to Coronation Street, where she would remain as Lucille until July 1974.

== Later career ==
After spending much of the 1970s and the early 1980s in relative obscurity, Moss finally beat her demons and slipped back into acting. She was heard on the Liverpool BBC radio soap opera The Merseysiders, and seen as an extra on Channel 4's Brookside. In 1986 she played Stephen McGann's mother in the BBC comedy series Help!, and in 1989, appeared as a waitress in the Bread Christmas special.

Moss returned to guest on television shows in the late 1990s, appearing on Tony Warren's episode of This Is Your Life, L!VE TV and Sky Soaps. In 1997, she acted opposite Patricia Routledge in an episode of Hetty Wainthropp Investigates, as a nosy neighbour. In 2000, Moss appeared on the programme After They Were Famous, and a year later was interviewed on Life After the Street.

== Personal life ==
In the 1980s, Moss successfully battled alcoholism, which was the reason underlying her being sacked from Coronation Street for bad behaviour, by then-producer Susi Hush in 1974. Moss stated that she drank to numb the pain she felt after the death of her father, Reg. In an interview with the Evening Times in 1979, Moss, then living in a three-apartment house in Wigan, found for her by the local Social Works Department when she was homeless, said: "My youngest daughter, Sarah, is only three years old and is mentally handicapped... while I was pregnant I was drinking all the time. I will go to my grave with this damage to my child on my conscience." Her eldest daughter, Naomi (like Sarah), was taken into care, and her baby boy had died when he was three days old, in 1976.

In August 1980, it was reported that Moss and her then fourth husband had broken into a local Labour club in a search for drink. She left court and was put on probation for two years.

Moss joined Alcoholics Anonymous and decided to settle in Liverpool in 1982, on the basis that the city had 28 Alcoholics Anonymous meetings weekly. She lived in a house owned by the Merseyside Housing Improvement Trust, and began to sort her life out. Before reviving her acting career, she took on various jobs as a waitress and a taxi driver, but there were also court appearances for breaking and entering and shoplifting, charges of which she was cleared.

She married five times. She wed her first husband, the son of a millionaire, in 1968, but they divorced the following year, after Moss gave birth to their daughter. She then married a Leeds motor dealer, Adrian Glick, who was violent towards her. Her third marriage was to a man ten years her junior and an alcoholic, while her fourth marriage, to a Liberal Party worker eighteen years younger than her, also dissolved quickly. In 1989, Moss wed her fifth husband, computer software expert and Cambridge graduate Stephen Ramsden, and was happily married to him until her death.

Towards the end of her life, she reconciled with her daughter Naomi, who later married and made Moss a grandmother. She was also often reunited with former and current Coronation Street stars, attending launches and anniversary parties. She and Ramsden ran an internet stamp collecting business.

According to the Wigan Evening Post, Moss had been in failing health for some time, but in her last year made a spiritual pilgrimage to India, where she finally came to terms with her father's death.

== Death ==
Moss died in September 2006 at her home in Dunfermline, Fife, Scotland. Her wish was to be buried next to her father, Reg, whose gravestone had already borne her name before she died. She had been estranged from her mother, Dora.
