= Stuart Latham =

English actor and television producer (1912–1993)

- Born: Harry Stuart Latham; 11 July 1912; Kingston upon Thames, Surrey, England
- Died: 31 August 1993 (aged 81)
- Occupations: Actor, director, television producer
- Spouse: Barbara Lott (m. 1940)

Harry Stuart Latham (11 July 1912 – 31 August 1993) was an English theatre and film actor, director and television producer.

== Biography ==
Latham was born in Kingston upon Thames, Surrey on 11 July 1912. After an apprenticeship in repertory theatre, including a period at Birmingham Rep, he played several small roles in films by Michael Powell in the 1930s. He also worked as a studio manager at Alexandra Palace before the Second World War. His acting work included minor parts in such films as Contraband (1940), The Ghost Train (1941) and The Man in the White Suit (1951). His work as a television director included ITV Television Playhouse (1950s), Biggles (1960s), Kipps (1960), Hobson's Choice (1962), The Victorians (1963), The Villains (1960s) and Victoria Regina (1966). In 1960, he became the first producer of the long-running soap opera, Coronation Street, for episodes 1–60, returning briefly for episodes 332–339.

He was married to the actress Barbara Lott from 1940 until his death on 31 August 1993.

== Selected filmography ==
- The Ghost Train (1941)
- Tawny Pipit (1944)
- The Man in the White Suit (1951)
- The Galloping Major (1951)
- Lady Killers (1981)
