= H. V. Kershaw =

British screenwriter and producer (1918–1992)

H. V. Kershaw, also known as Harry Kershaw, (29 May 1918 – 18 April 1992) was a British television scriptwriter and producer best known for his long association with the soap opera Coronation Street, a programme for which he continued to pen scripts until the late-1980s. His memoir, The Street Where I Live, reflects on the creation and casting of the serial, as well as its production until the early 1980s.

== Filmography ==
Title	As producer	As writer
Coronation Street	1962–1973; 580 episodes	1961–1988; 299 episodes
The Spoils of War		1981; 4 episodes
Leave it to Charlie		1978–1980; 26 episodes
Yanks Go Home		1976–1977; 4 episodes
Love Thy Neighbour		1975–1976; 2 episodes
Crown Court		1974–1975; 12 episodes
Village Hall		1975; 1 episode
The Life of Riley		1975; 7 episodes, also creator
Rest Assured: Lift Off	1972	1972
A Family at War		1970; 1 episode
Christmas in the Street	1968	
ITV Playhouse	1968; 2 episodes	
City '68	1967–1968; 19 episodes	1967–1968; 2 episodes, also creator
Pardon the Expression	1965–1966; 37 episodes	
Catch Hand		1964; 2 episodes
The Villains	1964; 1 episode	1964; 2 episodes
It's Dark Outside		1964; 1 episode
ITV Television Playhouse		1963; 1 episode
The Odd Man		1963; 1 episode
Knight Errant Limited		1960; 2 episodes
Biggles		1960; 21 episodes
The Verdict Is Yours		1959; 2 episodes
Shadow Squad		1957–1959 unknown episodes
Armchair Theatre		1956; 2 episodes

== In popular culture ==
Kershaw was portrayed by John Thomson in the 2010 television drama The Road to Coronation Street.
