= Ken Barlow =

Fictional character from Coronation Street

- Coronation Street character
- Portrayed by: William Roache
- Duration: 1960–present
- First appearance: Episode 1; 9 December 1960
- Created by: Tony Warren
- Introduced by: Stuart Latham
- Book appearances: Coronation Street: The Complete Saga; Coronation Street: The War Years
- Spin-off appearances: Ken and Deirdre's Bedtime Stories (2011)
- Crossover appearances: Corriedale (2026)
In-universe information
- Other names: Kenneth Barlow
- Occupation: Teacher; Warehouse executive; Taxi driver; Community Development Officer; Newspaper editor; Shop assistant
- Father: Frank Barlow
- Mother: Ida Barlow
- Brothers: David Barlow
- Wife: Valerie Tatlock (1962–1971); Janet Reid (1973–1977); Deirdre Langton (1981–1992, 2005–2015)
- Sons: Lawrence Cunningham; Peter Barlow; Daniel Osbourne
- Daughters: Susan Barlow
- Adoptive daughters: Tracy Barlow
- Grandsons: James Cunningham; Adam Barlow; Simon Barlow; Bertie Osbourne
- Granddaughters: Amy Barlow (adoptive)
- Grandmothers: Nancy Leathers
- Nephews: Darren Barlow

Kenneth "Ken" Barlow is a fictional character from the British soap opera Coronation Street, played by William Roache. He was created by Tony Warren as one of Coronation Street's original characters. December 2025 marked Barlow's 65th anniversary onscreen. He debuted in the soap's first episode on 9 December 1960. Having appeared in the role continuously since then, Roache is the longest-serving actor in a televised soap opera, and was honoured at the 2010 Guinness World Records ceremony for the achievement; the record was previously held by the actor Don Hastings from the American soap opera As the World Turns. Roache stated in 2010 that he had no plans to leave the role and would remain in Coronation Street for as long as the producers would have him. In November 2020, Roache was again presented with the Guinness World Record for the longest-serving TV soap star in the world for his six decades in Coronation Street.

Ken Barlow was introduced as the educated son of a working-class family. In being portrayed as arrogant, moralistic, and a political activist, he differed from the other characters in the soap opera, who were predominantly working class. The character developed a reputation as a ladies' man. Plots saw Ken dating numerous women, marrying four times to three different women. These were Valerie Tatlock in 1962, Janet Reid in 1972, Deirdre Barlow in 1981 and again in 2005. He fathered four children with three women (Lawrence Cunningham in 1961 from Ken's affair with Susan Cunningham – though he never knew about Lawrence until 2010 – twins Susan Barlow and Peter Barlow in 1965 from Ken's marriage to Valerie Tatlock, and in 1995 Daniel Osbourne from Ken's relationship with Denise Osbourne), as well as later adopting Deirdre's daughter Tracy Barlow. Of the many women Ken has been paired with, his relationship with Deirdre has been the most enduring. Ken and Deirdre's fictional relationship made newspaper headlines in Britain in 1983, due to Deirdre's adultery with Mike Baldwin. The storyline captured both media and viewer interest; 20 million people tuned in to watch Ken's discovery of the affair. The storyline led to a feud between Ken and Mike, prominent in both characters' narratives until Mike's screen death in 2006. In March 2017, Coronation Street centred a "whodunit" storyline around the character, in which Ken is pushed down the stairs by an unknown assailant; the storyline was dubbed "Who Attacked Ken?" On 26 May 2017, Ken's attacker was revealed as his son Daniel (Rob Mallard).

Despite his somewhat antagonistic role in the show's early years, Ken developed a reputation among critics for representing an archetypal "boring man." This is an allegation denied by Roache, who has cited Ken's evolution over the years, his chaotic love life and dysfunctional family as evidence to the contrary. Roache has been honoured with a lifetime achievement award at the British Soap Awards for his portrayal of Ken. Away from the canonical serial, Ken has been portrayed by Simon Chadwick in the play Corrie!. He has also been spoofed by impressionist Jon Culshaw.

== Creation and development ==
=== Casting ===
Frank (left) and Ken (right), in the Barlows' first scene. The juxtaposition of Frank eating in his shirtsleeves, meal smothered in brown sauce, and Ken in a tie, disdainful of the condiment, was used to establish Ken's characterisation as a snob, in conflict with his parents over his rejection of his working-class roots.

Ken Barlow is one of the twenty-two original Coronation Street characters devised by series creator Tony Warren. He made his debut in the soap's first episode, broadcast on 9 December 1960. While auditionees for the other twenty-one original roles were drawn from casting director Margaret Morris' contacts in the north of England, Warren spotted William Roache performing in the Granada Television play Marking Time, and knew that he was the right actor to play Ken. He attended the audition, at which he was asked to read The Daily Telegraph newspaper in a Lancashire accent. Roache believes that his indifference towards being cast had a positive impact on his audition, as it enabled him to relax. Two pilot episodes were filmed, with Ken played by Roache in one, and by actor Philip Lowrie in the other. Lowrie was later cast in the role of another original character, Dennis Tanner.

Roache was initially offered the role of Ken on a thirteen-episode, six-week contract. His agent convinced him to take it, as it would enhance his exposure around the broadcast of Marking Time. Coronation Street was a hit with viewers and its contract was extended. Roache was given a six-month contract in early 1961, followed by a one-year contract in June of that year, which he deemed amazing security at a time when he had been "leading a hand-to-mouth existence". The series became a long-running soap opera, airing multiple times weekly, and Roache continued in the role, though gradually ceased to affect a Lancashire accent. Roache was rumoured to have earned £10 per episode when he started compared to the £3,000 per episode that he earned in 2010. However, Roache himself confirmed this was untrue, citing the actual figure as £70. He stated in 2010 that although he initially only intended to feature in Coronation Street for a short time, once he had filmed it and it was transmitted with "such colossal impact", he realised it was something special.

According to writer Daran Little, Roache was partly responsible for the name of the street where the soap is set, Coronation Street, which also serves as the programme's title. The soap was originally titled Florizel Street when it was commissioned. Roache reportedly could not pronounce 'Florizel', so the name of the street was changed to Coronation Street.

=== Longevity ===
By 1984, following the departures of original characters Annie Walker, Albert Tatlock, Len Fairclough and Elsie Tanner, Ken was the only character from the original cast who remained in the soap opera. A potential storyline was devised in which Ken and his then-wife Valerie would move to Australia.

Spiritual enlightenment and a desire for self-improvement led Roache to consider quitting the series in the early 1970s, as he struggled with being in "the most ego-driven profession there is". He ultimately decided to stay—a decision he is happy with in retrospect, as his qualms were never with the series itself, but the way he felt personally. Roache said in 2010, "When people ask me why I've played the same role for 50 years I try to explain that I haven't because like all human beings, and thanks to clever script-writers, Ken's evolved. He's been married three times, had 24 girlfriends and is head of a totally dysfunctional family. He has a son [Peter] who's an alcoholic bigamist and a daughter [Tracy] who's a convicted murderer. How many actors get the chance to perform scenes with meaty content like that?"

=== Characterisation ===
"Ken has always been very earnest and honourable in his views, and he's tried to do the right thing. The trouble is that like any other human being he is flawed: we all are. When it came to the sort of job he would do, it was clear that teaching fitted perfectly with him as a person. Not only did it help satisfy him intellectually, it also allowed him to help others and at the same time give him a degree of control, which he probably always wanted. I always thought of him during that first decade as a young man who had a very stubborn streak in him when it came to his principles and what he thought was right."

— Roache on Ken's early characterisation.

Tony Warren created Ken as a "zeitgeist" of modern times in 1960, and it has been suggested that Ken is a "prism through which to read the political and cultural history of the last half century". In the soap's early years, Ken was frequently presented as resenting what he saw as the anti-intellectual, repressed climate around him, and author Dorothy Hobson has suggested that Ken was ashamed of his working-class roots. Roache concurs that Ken obviously had higher aspirations than "being stuck in Coronation Street", but notes that "he was also portrayed as a nice young guy who was happy to help out if he could". Roache considers himself "the guardian of Ken", responsible for ensuring that his actions and dialogue remain true to the character. This responsibility led to a two-year quarrel with his co-star Pat Phoenix, when she insisted that her character, Elsie Tanner, undermine Ken in an argument. Annoyed at Ken being belittled and the scene stripped of its "dramatic impact", Roache rowed with Phoenix, who did not speak to him again—outside of their scenes together—for two years.

The Guardian's Joe Moran likened Ken to Richard Hoggart's scholarship boy, "the 'uprooted and anxious' figure whose education had alienated him from his working-class origins". Moran suggested that Ken has led "what Hoggart once called a 'carousel life', a life not of the upward trajectory of the professional career but of living from year to year and taking whatever job turns up". Moran added that Ken "refused to go along with the last half century's stress on consumer aspiration and meritocratic elitism", but added that by modern standards, "Ken has wasted his education and his life. He has played little part in 'wealth creation' [...] and is still stuck in the same house he lived in when he was a student, leading his carousel life, stoically and decently".

Ken's political stance is left-liberal. He has been described as the most famous fictional reader of The Guardian, a newspaper that attracts readers of the mainstream left of British political opinion. Ken has had several forays into journalism for left-wing publications over the years, and was occasionally shown to be frustrated that his political views were not shared by others. A scathing article he wrote for a newspaper, in which he labelled his neighbours as "lazy-minded, politically ignorant, starved of a real culture and prejudiced against any advance in human insight and scientific progress", led to clashes with his father and a fistfight at the Rovers with Len Fairclough (Peter Adamson). Although Ken has occasionally espoused socialist ideology, Roache suggests that he is really more of a "liberal, fair-minded guy [...] always looking to right the wrongs of society", and "a man of integrity who fights for what he thinks is right".

Author Graeme Kay discussed Ken's evolution within the show: "He began as a bit of a prig, in the eyes of working-class father Frank, but matured into a sound family man, only to go astray. He changed from teacher to newspaper owner, through various jobs, but threw that away too. He has always liked to see himself as a big fish in a small pond, with his steely, domineering manner and feeling of superior intellect." Little suggested that Ken has transformed from an angry young man who never fitted in and was always challenging the system, into a bore next door, eventually discovering that he could not change the world after all. Little dubbed Ken Coronation Street's elder statesman and lynch-pin, a one-man Greek tragedy, and the greatest survivor in Weatherfield.

The character has a reputation amongst critics as boring and a man of morals; Moran dubbed him the archetypal boring man. Chronicling the history of Coronation Street in 2007, Virgin Media stated, "Perhaps unfairly dubbed boring, Ken is ultimately an intelligent man, frustrated by the cards life has dealt him – although the hair, clothes and strong morals haven't helped." Popular perception of Ken as being boring originated, in Roache's view, around the time of the Ken–Deirdre–Mike love triangle storyline. He denies the label, particularly given that Ken has had numerous romantic dalliances during his tenure. Karen Price of the Western Mail called him the Street's resident intellectual, who has never quite managed to break free from his roots.

=== Relationships ===
Ken is known for having had multiple relationships with women during his time in Coronation Street. Discussing this, author Hobson has suggested that Ken's numerous relationships could give the impression that the character is a lothario or a great romantic; however, Hobson noted that this would be inaccurate as Ken is "neither a great romantic nor someone with whom you would be wise to trust your romantic or emotional future. In fact, he is one of the characters about whom audiences would tend to want to warn any female characters to 'stay away, it'll end in tears'". Roache feels that Ken's approach to romance early in his tenure belied his educated, intellectual affectations, and revealed him to be a typical "northern working-class man at heart." He explained: "[Ken] was the sort who wanted to have a wife who would stay at home, look after the kids and make sure the house was run smoothly, while he went off to work to pursue a career. It was very old-fashioned in many ways, but he could never see it that way and it was often left to the women he had relationships with to remind him of that trait in his character."

Ken's many relationships have been marred by infidelities. Despite being generally "well-meaning", Roache assessed that for the first two decades of Coronation Street, Ken had a ruthless streak where women were involved. While he has since mellowed somewhat, he was initially a "sensitive, thinking chauvinist who liked the idea of having a wife who was always there for him, but at the same time [...] found nothing wrong with flirting or going off with another woman." ITV publicity referred to the number of relationships and flings he has had, stating "This could take a while ... Ken has had more girlfriends than most of the Street's male residents put together." Between the periods of 1960 and 2007, Ken married four times and dated 27 women, including a character played by the then unknown actress Joanna Lumley, who played headmaster's daughter Elaine Perkins in 1973.

==== Valerie Tatlock ====
Ken's first notable relationship in the serial was with the character Valerie Tatlock (Anne Reid) in 1961. Roache and Reid had been to neighbouring schools, which gave them common ground and a relaxed attitude to working together. Roache once attributed their success to his own rapport with Reid, citing it as a helpful element in their on-screen chemistry. Ken and Valerie married on 4 August 1962. Aware that the characters had become popular, executive producer H. V. Kershaw requested that Granada Television's evening duty officer be made available on the night of broadcast, to take viewers' congratulatory phone calls. Although no calls were made, 20 million viewers watched the wedding episode. Reid was "thrilled" with the reaction to the wedding. Roache was initially sceptical about the impact marriage would have on Ken's development. Roache said: "I was a sort of young semi-heartthrob in those days and thought getting married was going to finish all that." He felt that, given Ken's aspirations of upward social mobility and desire to leave Weatherfield, marriage conflicted with his characterisation, but realised it was necessary for the writers to anchor him in the area. Ken and Valerie were deemed an early example of a soap opera supercouple.

Valerie gave birth to twins, Peter and Susan, and became a housewife to look after them. All scenes involving the child actors were filmed separately from episodic shoots, to avoid unwanted noise ruining Roache and Reid's scenes. In one storyline, Ken had to start looking after the children more frequently, but he grew bored and would often leave them unattended. Valerie accused him of attempted murder on one occasion when a small house fire occurred – with the twins trapped inside. His boredom with his marriage caused him to have an affair with Jackie Marsh (Pamela Craig). There were only "kissing scenes" written into scripts, but the production team made it clear they were having a sexual relationship. The storyline "horrified" viewers, and Craig received abusive letters from angry fans. Craig knew nothing more than a short affair could occur between the pair. On-screen Elsie Tanner convinced him to end the affair; Valerie found out, but forgave him. Roache enjoyed the aftermath, as it added a new dimension to Ken, whereby "He was a married man with kids, and had all of those good intentions, but he was also liable to stray and clearly had trouble resisting the temptation of another woman."

Ken and Valerie's marriage came to an untimely end in 1971. Following Reid's decision to leave the role – having grown bored of playing the character – the producers opted to kill Valerie off. Reid and Roache were briefly concerned that her departure would result in Ken being written out, and Roache recalls that Ken emigrating with the twins was a scenario under consideration. To his relief, he was kept on. Valerie died after being electrocuted while trying to mend a faulty hair dryer. After the fatal shock, she knocked over an electric heater, setting the Barlow's house on fire. A then-record audience of 18 million viewers tuned in for Valerie's death, scripted by Leslie Duxbury. The following episode ended with Ken walking through the burned remains of their home, in a scene that Roache has deemed one of his "most enjoyable and satisfying moments in Coronation Street."

==== Janet Reid ====
"Janet clearly saw Ken as someone who might provide the sort of lifestyle she wanted if he was pushed and manoeuvred in the right direction. She had plans for them to move away from the Street and into a bigger house, and went along with the idea Ken had of getting the twins back to live with them, while all along having no intention of sharing a home with his kids. it soon became clear that the marriage was not going to be a happy one, and Janet was no Val."

— Roache, on Ken and Janet's relationship.

Ken's second marriage in the serial was to a character named Janet Reid (Judith Barker) in 1973; their relationship was short-lived. There was no buildup to their marriage; Ken returned from Scotland and introduced Janet as his wife. The storyline's fast pace angered Roache; he once stressed: "I was very cross about the whole thing. There was no wedding, she just arrived, no build-up to it. It was just like an idea that was shoved in. I wasn't happy." The storyline was unpopular with viewers, who did not approve of the wedding. Janet was already an unpopular character by then, because of her previous affairs with two other Coronation Street males. Barker said Janet was often perceived as treating Ken unfairly. She openly showed her dislike for his children and sent them to boarding school. The situation saw Ken realise he was in a "loveless marriage" – a match made whilst feeling lonely and under the presumption that she was his last chance of happiness. The breakdown of their marriage was accompanied by what Little dubbed "a series of spectacular rows", which saw Ken become violent towards Janet. One such row, which followed Ken's discovery of Janet's plans to send the twins to boarding school, was later used as an exercise in drama schools, which Roache deemed "a nice compliment to everyone involved in creating the moment."

Janet and Ken split up in 1974. Barker was included in the series on and off for a few years, as Janet would occasionally return to be with Ken. In late 1976, Barker was asked to reprise the role for a final time. Janet returned on-screen in 1977 and asked Ken for another chance, claiming she had changed. When he rejects her, she commits suicide by taking an overdose. Barker recalled the "exhausting" scenes she and Roache filmed, and said there was substantial "dramatic tracking" scenes as Ken discovered her dead in bed. Ken was described as "shattered" and "remorseful" by the death of Janet, and felt guilty over the fact he did not try to help her more. To worsen his situation, he was initially suspected of murdering her.

==== Deirdre Hunt ====
In 1972, Deirdre Hunt, played by Anne Kirkbride, was introduced into Coronation Street; the character would become synonymous with Ken's narrative when, in the early 1980s, Deirdre became Ken's third wife. A combined audience of 24 million viewers tuned in to see the nuptials.

Roache inferred that the writers no longer knew how to utilise Ken. Although he had rarely done so in the past, he voiced his concerns to the series' producer, dismayed that the character "seemed to be floating in a nebulous state". He believes that Ken was thereafter included in "much stronger stuff" as a result, including a storyline in which Deirdre had an affair with his rival, Mike Baldwin (Briggs). The storyline was devised in 1982. Then producer Mervyn Watson recalls: "It was normal story conference and we looked at the Ken/Deirdre marriage and had the idea of her having an affair with somebody in the Street. It was extremely passionately debated because there were categorical and opposite view points expressed." Watson believes that actors often feel "disturbed and uncomfortable" at the prospect of what their character will experience. In turn, he thought the scenario generated some of the best performances in the actors' careers. He concluded that Roache proved his theory correct, and praised his performance.

"The now famous 'love triangle showdown' scene on the doorstep on No.1 will always be my favourite. Ken's contempt for his wife, Deirdre, and her lover, Mike Baldwin, was at its most venomous, and I was given free reign [sic] to vent my spleen – so much so that even Anne Kirkbride didn't know how I was going to play the scene. All the anger and hurt Ken was feeling spilled out."

— Roache recalls his favourite Coronation Street scene. (1996)

A now infamous scene, in which Ken comes face-to-face with Mike following the discovery of the affair and a showdown ensues, was originally scripted differently. Roache disliked this version, as he believed Ken's response lacked realism. Partly fuelled by his previous frustration with Ken's "lame" characterisation, Roache approached the episode's director, Brian Mills, and requested that Ken be allowed to hit Mike. Though the filming set-up planned for the scene did not allow for this, it was agreed that Ken would attempt to hit Mike, and that Deirdre would intervene.

Roache recalls viewers taking it very seriously, to the point that he received letters reading: "Dear Ken, I thought you should know that Mike Baldwin is seeing your wife!" 20 million viewers tuned in for the episode; it attained the soap's second-highest recorded overnight ratings, surpassed only by the farewell episode of Hilda Ogden (played by Jean Alexander) in 1987.

Ken and Deirdre have been described as soap opera's version of Richard Burton and Elizabeth Taylor. Their relationship featured various affairs, break-ups and reunions over the years. The couple's first marriage eventually disintegrated in the early 1990s, this time when Ken had an affair with colleague Wendy Crozier, a dalliance which ended in divorce for the Barlows. Ken was kicked out of home on New Year's Day 1990. Their on/off relationship continued, with each having various other liaisons, until producers decided to reunite Ken and Deirdre in 1999. Ken and Deirdre's second marriage in 2005 was watched by an estimated 13 million viewers, compared to the nine million who watched the wedding of Prince Charles to Camilla Parker Bowles the following day. Coincidentally, Ken and Deirdre's first wedding in 1981 was screened within 48 hours of Prince Charles and Princess Diana's wedding, and just as in 2005, the Barlow wedding attracted more viewers than the royal wedding.

During Anne Kirkbride's lifetime, Roache was complimentary about Ken and Deirdre, as well as about Kirkbride—whom, he stated, he loved as much as Ken loved Deirdre—with this love explaining why Ken always ended up returning to her. Speaking in 2010, Roache said: "We have been together on screen for pretty much 30 years now and so much of what we do on camera is instinctive. We really are like an old married couple who have had their ups and downs, lived through them and come out the other side."

==== Denise Osbourne ====
Ken was paired romantically with hairdresser Denise Osbourne (Denise Black) in 1994, the romance scuppering the chances of a reconciliation between recent divorcees Ken and Deirdre. Scriptwriters had actually been planning to reunite Ken and Deirdre, but when Kirkbride fell ill and had to be written out, the scripts were changed and Ken was paired with Denise instead. Black has suggested that the romance came out of nowhere.

The Official Coronation Street Annual 1997 has described Ken and Denise as a "mis-matched pair" who were never destined to spend their lives together. In the storyline, Ken fathered Denise's son Daniel. They had an on/off relationship and a wedding was planned in 1996; however, in a plot twist, it was revealed to Ken that Denise, unable to "hold her primitive lusts in check", was having an affair with her brother-in-law, Brian. Upon the discovery, Ken's happiness was snatched away in what has been described by Sunday Mail as "harrowing circumstances", and one of the character's worst moments. Denise Black has discussed her character's ambivalence towards her relationship with Ken, revealing why she believed Denise engaged in infidelity: "The thing is that she's in love with both men. When she's with Brian she loves him. And she's completely in love with Ken when he's with her. So she has two loves and all the guilt that goes along with that scenario. Denise doesn't mean to cause so much pain. Her problem is that she just doesn't know whether she's coming or going." When Ken discovered the truth the wedding was called off, with Ken telling Denise to "get out before I kill you".

Following the revelation and amidst the fallout, Denise absconded, leaving her son in Ken's custody. This facilitated Black's desire to have a six-month break from the serial. The character returned in the winter of 1996, for the last part of her storyline, Black having decided to quit the role. Denise's return storyline was scripted to coincide with Coronation Street's increase to four weekly episodes. It focused upon a custody battle for Daniel between Ken and Denise after Denise snatched Daniel. A source at the time discussed the storyline and Ken's reaction to losing his son: "Ken is devastated when he returns home the week before Christmas and finds his son gone. He simply can't believe he's been snatched by the woman who dumped them. He immediately starts a custody battle. Denise plays heavily on the fact that she is the mother, while Ken [claims] that he is back in a relationship with his ex-wife Deirdre. Deirdre actually goes to court with him for support, but she gets angry when she finds out he tries to use their friendship as a lever to get Daniel back." When Denise was awarded custody, she left Coronation Street and Ken lost contact with his son.

Denise was reintroduced for several months in 2007, over a decade after she had last appeared. Ken tracked down his son following marital unease with Deirdre, which led to interactions with Denise when he turned up unannounced for a visit. Black was pleased to be invited back, saying "I don't think that you can have Ken Barlow's baby and forget about it, can you?" Denise's return was used as a catalyst to cause further problems in Ken and Deirdre's marriage, Ken having grown discontented. It was only a brief return; once Denise's advances towards Ken were rejected, Denise was written out again. Denise briefly returned in 2017 as part of Who Attacked Ken?, for her son Daniel was the attacker.

==== Martha Fraser ====
In January 2009, Martha Fraser (played by Stephanie Beacham), a new love interest for Ken, was introduced to the show. Ken meets Martha by the canal while he is walking his dog, Eccles. Martha reveals that she is a theatre actress who travels to performances on her barge. Ken seeks her out again, and he helps her go through her lines. Roache told What's on TV that Ken is happy to find a "like-minded person" who is easy to talk to. He enjoys telling Martha about his problems, his son and his grandchildren, as she is not judgmental. When asked if Ken mentions Deirdre, Roache said "Er... no. Martha asks him about Peter's mum and Ken tells her that she's dead, which is the truth, so Martha automatically assumes he's a widower and he doesn't put her right." Ken also chooses not to mention Martha to Deirdre; Roache believed that she would be angry if she found out. Roache revealed that Ken is not thinking about having an affair with Martha, but he is "captivated" by her, and does have feelings for her. During the storyline, Roache's wife, Sara, died. Roache was given compassionate leave from the soap, and writers were forced to rework Ken's storyline. Ken and Martha eventually consummate their relationship, and Ken considers leaving Deirdre and Weatherfield. He changes his mind at the last minute, and Martha leaves, alone.

Alison Graham of Radio Times said Martha was Ken's soulmate, because "she's the most perfectly bourgeois bit-on-the-side." Graham said that Martha allowed Ken's "middle-class heart" to sing after the pair bonded over a love of BBC Radio 4, books and plays. Comparing Ken's relationships with Martha and Deirdre to a prison sentence, Graham said Martha offered Ken a deserving parole from the "years of breaking rocks in the prison yard of his marriage to Deirdre." She hoped that Ken and Martha were "soon in the throes of ecstasy", because Ken deserved it. Following the conclusion to Ken's relationship with Martha, Roache expressed an interest in having more girlfriends for Ken introduced in the future. The actor said, "I thought it was great last year having a girlfriend, especially at my age. A few more would be great. I've lost count of romances I've had in the show, not to mention the four weddings." Ken and Martha's romance was later depicted in the Coronation Street musical, Corrie!. Ben East of The Stage said the romance was "genuinely funny".

==== Other relationships ====
Ken's first on-screen relationship was with Susan Cunningham (Shakesby), whom he dated throughout the first ten episodes. Ashamed of his family and background, Ken was constantly apologising to her. This frustrated Susan, who actually liked Coronation Street. Fifty years later, it transpired that their relationship had left Susan pregnant, resulting in the birth of a son, Lawrence. After Susan, Ken's early love interests included Marian Lund (Patricia Heneghan), a librarian eleven years his senior; Yvonne Chappell (Alex Marshall), a hotel receptionist he met en route to first wife Valerie's funeral; Norma Ford (Diana Davies), an impressionable young shop-assistant; Wendy Nightingale (Susan Tebbs), a married woman who moved in with Ken, making them Coronation Street's first unmarried cohabiting couple; and Elaine. Roache believes that Ken was in love with Elaine, though her feelings for him were less intense. He recalls some discussion of re-introducing her to the series in 2009; however, this did not come to fruition. Upon separating from Elaine, Ken confided in his friend Rita (Knox) that, "There were other fellers more glamorous, more successful, more wealthy and more interesting than me." According to Roache, the line offers insight into Ken's psyche, evidencing that he truly belongs on Coronation Street, despite his desires to the contrary.

Although the number of romances Ken was involved in declined from the 1980s onwards, Roache states that those relationships he did have "tended to be bigger and more involved". His later love interests included Wendy Crozier (Kerr), Alma Sedgewick (Barrie) and Maggie Redman (Kerman).

=== Family ===
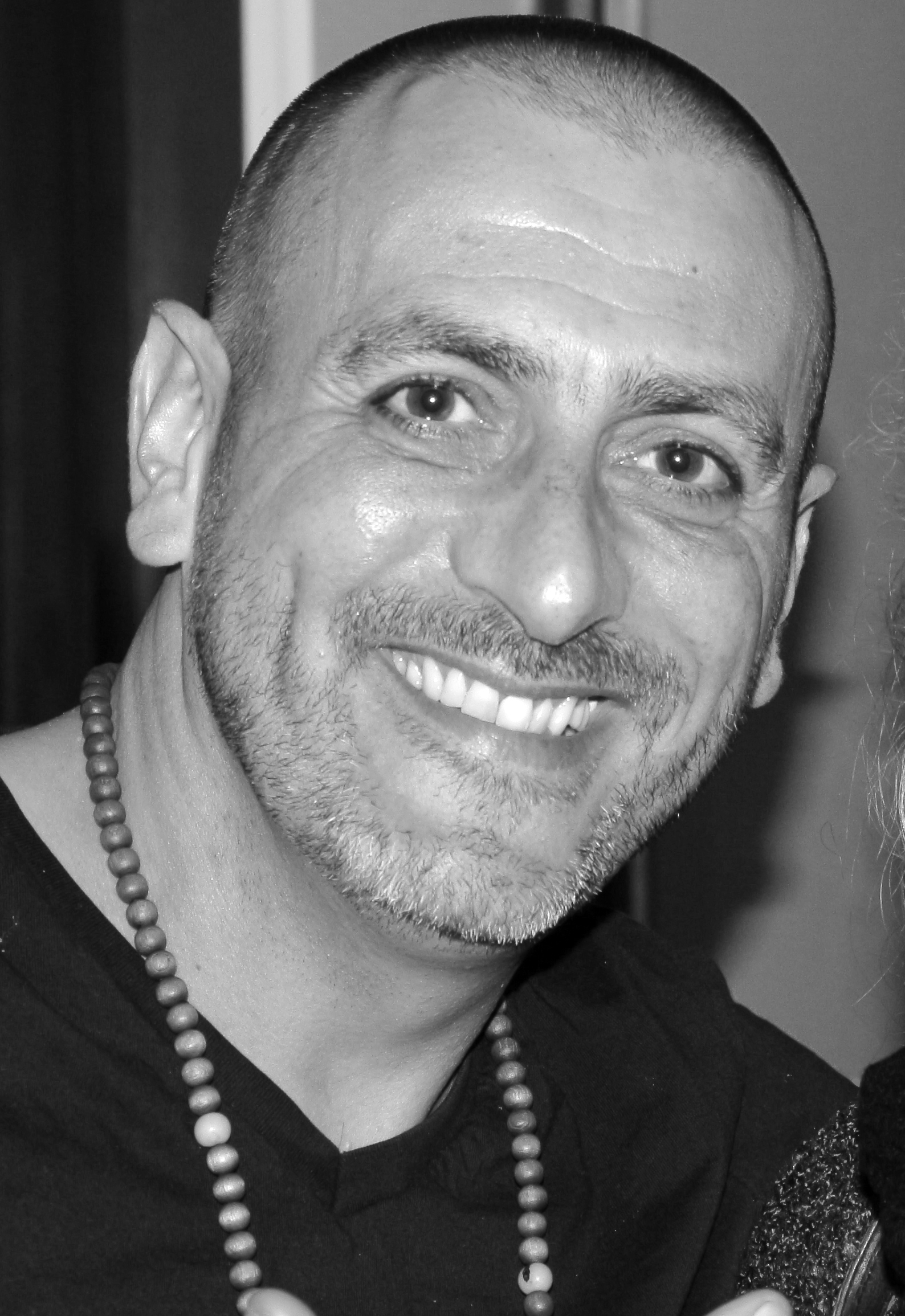
Chris Gascoyne plays Ken's son Peter Barlow.

Ken was disdainful of his parents, Frank (Pemberton) and Ida (Dyson). Their strained familial relationship was apparent from his very first scene, in which conflict arose over his reluctance to eat a meal with brown sauce. Roache called it "good character-defining stuff", which established the antagonism between Ken and his father, borne from Ken's snobbery and desire to abandon his roots. The death of his mother further illuminated the father-son relationship. Roache recalls that, "although their relationship could often be stormy, with Ken's views and attitude rubbing Frank up the wrong way on a number of issues, the fact was that they had been thrown together by her death and they had to get used to living with each other without the buffer that Ida had often provided." While Dyson left the series under her own volition, Pemberton later became one of several cast members fired under Aspinall's tenure as producer. By 1984, both of Ken's parents had left the Street. Ken was originally intended to have a sister named Enid. Warren decided against her inclusion, and instead created a younger brother, professional footballer David (Rothwell), to enable the show to represent teenage males. Rothwell feels that an "underlying antagonism" existed between Ken and David, which stemmed from the fact Ken had the advantage of a university education, while his brother did not.

Ken was bored with looking after the children, Peter and Susan, before Valerie's death. Afterwards, further problems occurred and Ken was no longer able to cope. The writers were initially uncertain whether to continue with Ken as a single father, or dispatch the children and pursue a less-encumbered lifestyle. Roache said, "Ken tried to bring up the kids on his own, but he wasn't doing so good. So he sent them up to Glasgow to live with his mother-in-law." Ken still remained in contact; Roache recalled Ken often saying: "Right, I'm off to Scotland.'" Roache has suggested that the subsequent problems in his children's adulthood were Ken's fault: "I blame Ken for how they've all turned out. He shoved his kids up in Scotland, didn't really look after them. But you don't want a happy family in the Street. You want a wonderful dysfunctional one like the one I've got, they're great and Deirdre is wonderful." The animosity between Ken and his children has been explored throughout the programme's duration. Chris Gascoyne, who took on the role of Peter in the 2000s, has suggested that there is a lot of tension between Ken and Peter due to the dysfunctional nature of the Barlow family. Guilt over the twins' upbringing led Ken to dote on his youngest son, Daniel, as he was keen to avoid repeating his past mistakes. Their close relationship resulted in Roache challenging the series producers when a script required Ken to allow Daniel to be taken away by his mother. The actor felt that Ken would not accept this; he would fight. The scriptwriters apologised, but it was too late to re-write the plot.

After Valerie's death, Ken became responsible for looking after her uncle, Albert, and he later became known as Ken's "Uncle Albert". Albert would often make attempts to interfere in Ken's life, as he had no one else. At one stage, Ken was making plans to leave Weatherfield. When Albert revealed he could not pay his bills on his pension, Ken opted to stay. The storyline has been called a turning point for Ken—when he realised he belonged in Coronation Street and had to help the community and Albert alike. Ken moved in with him and Albert gradually saw Ken as "the son he never had". Roache enjoyed the opportunity to work closely with Howarth, whom he first met as a schoolboy. He characterised Ken and Albert's relationship as "often a little bumpy and uncomfortable, but underlying all of that was an affection the two had for each other."

Ken had a largely antagonistic relationship with his "acid-tongued" mother-in-law Blanche, Deirdre's mother, who has been described as a "thorn in Ken's side". She would criticise his looks, and on one occasion she accused him of being homosexual. When Ken's affair with Martha was exposed, Blanche took her comments too far: she tormented Deirdre for staying with him, which resulted in her being thrown out of the Barlow household and forced to live with Peter. However, she was seen as "the glue" of the Barlow family in the modern era, holding them together. Blanche was willing to put her wit aside and fight to ensure that Ken and Deirdre stayed together, although most of the time, she interfered in his life. Even in death, Blanche managed to make a final remark aimed at Ken, through her will. The storyline was described as giving her the chance to have "the last laugh".

In 2010, it was announced that Roache's own children, Linus and James, would be joining the cast. They played his long-lost son and grandson, respectively. In the storyline, Ken finds a letter which discloses he had a secret son with a short-term girlfriend. Roache said he looked forward "immensely" to working with his children during the fiftieth-anniversary year. The reunion was short-lived due to a rift between Lawrence and James. Lawrence was a bigot who could not accept that the fact James was homosexual. The producers decided to run the storyline to highlight the fact homophobia still exists. Gay rights activists approved of the storyline because the producers showed both sides of the issue. On-screen, Ken was opposed to Lawrence's views and decided to embrace James' sexuality. He urged him to be true to himself and ignore his father's bigoted views. Lawrence does not agree with Ken's liberal stance. In 2011, James returned to stay with Ken. Ken was grateful for the chance to get to know him better. Ken sees James as his "intellectual match", and has a lot of respect for him because he is a "well-educated, erudite young man". He became carried away and moved him in because Ken has always "longed for intelligent conversation".

=== Feud with Mike Baldwin ===
Television researcher Helena Robson has discussed the appeal of soap operas, and suggests that "many soap stories are never finally resolved and conflicts between characters may run throughout the programme's history". She uses the "undying hatred" between Ken Barlow and Mike Baldwin (Johnny Briggs) as an example of this, suggesting that viewers "welcome the sense of stability this offers although the element of change offers as much enjoyment for viewers." It was suggested in an ITV documentary in 2006 that Ken and Mike's hatred was a clash of cultures: "Barlow the lefty do-gooder versus Baldwin, the cut-and-thrust money grabber." Briggs has claimed that Ken was envious of Mike because he was rich and successful while Ken was not, and Roache has claimed that the reason Ken disliked Mike was because he was a self-centred and self-made individual.

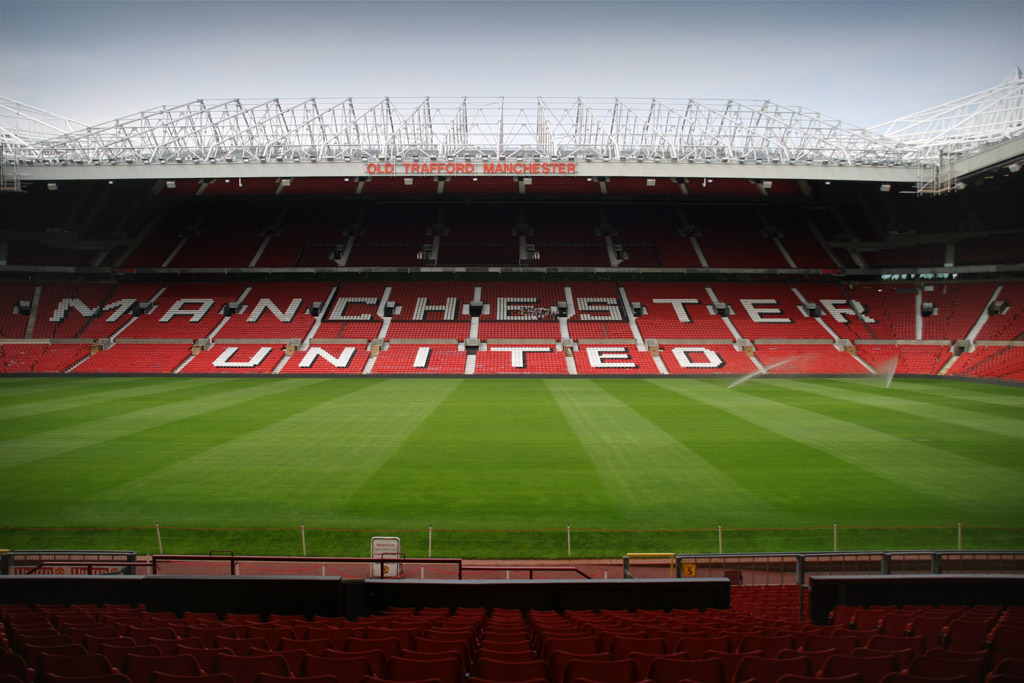
The Old Trafford football ground. During the Ken-Mike-Deirdre love triangle in 1983, fans watching a match were informed that Deirdre was staying with Ken. The scoreboard flashed "Ken 1, Mike 0".

Ken's feud with Mike—spanning over 20 years—began in 1983, when Ken discovered that his wife, Deirdre, was having an affair with Baldwin. His dislike for Mike pre-dated the affair, however, and Roache has stated:

"The truth was that Ken never liked him, but having his wife go off and have an affair with Mike turned dislike into hatred, which was wonderful for the programme. Just the mention of Baldwin's name was enough to get Ken twitching with barely contained anger, and for Johnny Briggs and me it was absolutely wonderful. At best the two characters sometimes tolerated each other in an uneasy truce, but at worst the two of them not only threw insults at each other, but punches too. It was a relationship that ran for many years, and although towards the end of Mike Baldwin's time on the show you might say there was a little mellowing going on, it was never a relationship that was going to be anything other than uneasy."

— William Roache, 50 Years on the Street.

Of the love triangle storyline, Briggs has said, "the way it captured the nation was amazing. Everyone was talking about it and the pubs were empty. Men were shouting out: 'Go on Mike, give her one.' People were disappointed when she went back to Ken". The storyline had significant cultural impact, with the press claiming that the country was divided between those who thought Deirdre should remain with Ken, and those who thought she should leave with Mike. In her 2003 book, Hobson suggested that Ken "spent at least nineteen years unable to cope with the sense of rejection and betrayal" caused by Mike and Deirdre's affair.

Scriptwriters capitalised on the rivalry between the characters when, in 1986, Mike married Ken's daughter Susan, a union that Ken strongly opposed. Numerous fights between Ken and Mike were featured, and Briggs has suggested that they became famous for their brawls. The first fight between the pair occurred in 1986, when Ken confronted Mike in his factory about Mike's maltreatment of his daughter. Of the confrontation, Briggs has said, "It was a classic – Baldwin getting it in his own territory, the factory. It took a lot to get Ken angry but after the way Mike had treated his daughter, he was furious. He marched into the office and let him have it. This was one of those rare times he caught Mike off-guard." Mike was shown to get revenge on Ken, though it took a further four years before he could do so on-screen. In a scene which aired in 1990, Mike punched Ken, knocking him over a table in the Rovers Return public house. Briggs has suggested that he and Roache became old hands at doing on-screen fistfights, and that both really enjoyed doing the stunts. According to Briggs, no choreographers were ever used. In 1998, one incident left Briggs with an injury after he fell backwards.

Ken and Mike were forced to work together in 2000, when they were featured in a storyline dubbed the "Freshco siege". Ken and Mike were among several series regulars held up at gunpoint in the soap's local supermarket, where Ken had been working as a trolley pusher. The episode was broadcast after the 9 pm watershed due to its depiction of violence. Ken and Mike were bound together by armed robbers, which facilitated an end to their feud; Ken helped Mike to combat a panic attack. The pair resolved to put the past behind them; it was a temporary reprieve. Mike had unknowingly fathered a son, Adam, during his brief marriage to Susan Barlow; she kept the baby a secret from him. Mike discovered Adam's existence in 2001; Susan attempted to flee, but was killed in a motor accident. Then followed a battle between Mike and Ken for custody of Adam, with Ken adamant that Mike should not look after his grandson. The storyline led to the fifth fistfight between Ken and Mike in the soap's history, with the pair brawling at the funeral of Susan.

The feud came to an end on-screen in 2006, when Briggs quit the role of Mike. Mike was killed off, dying of Alzheimer's disease; he died in Ken's arms. In the final scenes, a disorientated and dying Mike was found wandering the streets by Ken, and as Ken cradled Mike in his arms, the rivals talked about old times before Mike died, signifying the end of their 20-year feud. To promote Mike's final scenes, Radio Times released a series of photographs with Ken and Mike re-enacting Arthur Devis's (1807) painting of the death of Horatio Nelson—Baldwin was shown surrounded by his nearest and dearest during his final moments, with Ken prominently positioned next to him, taking on the role of Captain Hardy, Nelson's trusted colleague to whom Nelson famously uttered "Kiss me" before he died. Producer Maire Tracey said, "The fact that Mike dies in Ken's arms says it all. For most of Mike's life, it was his battles with Ken that kept him going. Like two cowboys, they spent their lives sizing each other up. Behind the scenes Bill Roache has even suggested to Johnny Briggs that they should make a version of Brokeback Mountain for the two elderly cowboys. Both Ken and Mike will miss the bust-ups."

Reflecting on the feud in 2006, Roache gave reasons why he thinks Ken and Mike clashed so often: "Ken felt threatened when Mike arrived on the street, but it made the part more exciting for Bill. Ken is a nice guy, a loyal guy, a reliable guy. But he isn't terribly exciting. So the exciting guy [Mike] comes along and he's a bit flash, isn't he? But I've always liked the physical side of acting, so my punch-ups with Johnny were probably the best bits. I shall miss those terribly."

=== Who Attacked Ken? ===
In March 2017, Ken was at the centre of a "whodunit" storyline which saw an unknown assailant push him down the stairs of his house after striking him over the head with a blunt object. The suspect list was initially narrowed down to six: Adam Barlow (Sam Robertson), Peter Barlow (Chris Gascoyne), Tracy Barlow (Kate Ford), Daniel Osbourne (Rob Mallard), Pat Phelan (Connor McIntyre) and Sinead Tinker (Katie McGlynn). However, other suspects such as Amy Barlow (Elle Mulvaney), Simon Barlow (Alex Bain), Rob Donovan (Marc Baylis) and Chloe Tipton (Jo-Anne Knowles) were later added into the frame. That May, it was revealed Daniel was the attacker.

== Storylines ==
Ken Barlow is born and raised at 3 Coronation Street, Weatherfield, Lancashire, the eldest son of Frank (Frank Pemberton) and Ida Barlow (Noel Dyson). An intelligent pupil, Ken attends grammar school after passing his eleven plus exam, and in 1957 wins a scholarship at the University of Manchester where he lives with his parents and brother David (Alan Rothwell). There, he gains a second class honours degree in History and English.

After his mother dies in a car crash in 1961, Ken turns down a teaching post to support his father. Previous tensions between him and his father over his father's perception that Ken was making an effort to distance himself from his working class roots come to a head in 1964. Ken begins teaching and married Valerie Tatlock (Anne Reid) in July 1962. Two years later, he has a fling with exotic dancer Pip Mistral (Elaine Stevens), but his marriage survives. He and his wife have twins Peter (Robert Heanue) and Susan (Katie Heanneau) on 15 April 1965. In January 1966, Ken has an affair with reporter Jackie Marsh (Pamela Craig). Valerie leaves when she finds out about this but is later persuaded to return.

Ken continues to stand up for his political beliefs throughout the series and spends seven days in prison in March 1967 after being arrested for protesting. David dies in 1970, followed by Ken's father in 1975, leaving him the sole surviving Barlow. He is left a single parent following Valerie's untimely death after she is electrocuted in January 1971, and he is left heartbroken. Ken is supported by Valerie's uncle Albert Tatlock (Jack Howarth), with whom he shares a close relationship, but caring for the twins proves too difficult and they are sent to live with their grandparents in Glasgow.

Ken has numerous flings, including a one-night stand with Rita Littlewood (Barbara Knox), but his next serious relationship occurs in 1973, when Ken marries Janet Reid (Judith Barker), in the hope that she will mother his two children. Janet refuses to do this, and in 1974 they separate. Janet flits in and out of Ken's life until 1977, when she kills herself by taking an overdose when Ken turns down a reconciliation.

When Ray Langton (Neville Buswell) leaves his wife Deirdre (Anne Kirkbride) in 1978, Ken supports her. In 1981, they marry, with Ken adopting Deirdre's four-year-old daughter Tracy (Christabel Finch). However, by 1983, Deirdre grows bored with Ken and has an affair with his rival, Mike Baldwin (Johnny Briggs). Ken and Deirdre's marriage suffers; the couple separate in 1990, and eventually divorce following Ken's affair with Wendy Crozier (Roberta Kerr), his colleague at the local newspaper, The Weatherfield Recorder. Ken takes the separation badly and attempts suicide by overdose, but is prevented from doing so by his friend, Bet Gilroy (Julie Goodyear).

Ken and Mike, who are the moral opposites of each other, remain enemies; Ken is incensed when his daughter, Susan, falls in love and has a short-lived marriage with Mike. In 1991, Ken and Mike compete for the same woman, Alma Sedgewick (Amanda Barrie). When she is dumped by Mike in favour of Jackie Ingram (Shirin Taylor), she starts seeing Ken. On Christmas Day 1991, Mike lures Alma back into his bed to get back at Ken. Later in 1992, Ken falls for one of his pupil's mothers – Maggie Redman (Jill Kerman). The Baldwin/Barlow feud erupts again, as Mike is the father of Maggie's son, Mark Redman (Christopher Oakswood). Mike hates the thought of Ken spending Christmas Day with his son, but Ken's pride gets the better of him. He cannot handle the situation, and he and Maggie split.

Ken has a relationship with hairdresser Denise Osbourne (Denise Black) in 1994 and fathers her child; their son Daniel (Lewis Harney) is born in 1995. Denise agrees to marry Ken, but is having an affair with her brother-in-law Brian Dunkley (Benny Young) at the same time. She leaves Weatherfield in 1996, leaving Daniel with Ken. It is a short-lived custody as, later that year, Denise returns and snatches Daniel; Ken's attempts to reclaim his son fail.

Ken and Deirdre remain close, despite their other relationships. They reunite in 1999, following encouragement from Deirdre's mother Blanche Hunt (Maggie Jones). They eventually remarry on 8 April 2005; although in January 2003 Ken discovers that Deirdre had sex with Dev Alahan (Jimmi Harkishin) during Christmas 2001, he forgives her and they remain together. Deirdre supports Ken in October 2002 when he loses his teaching post for assaulting a pupil, Aidan Critchley (Dean Ashton), who has been terrorising him. Marital problems arise in 2006 when, following Mike's death from Alzheimer's disease, Ken grows jealous of Deirdre's consequent grief; he leaves home and tries to rebuild a relationship with his estranged son Daniel. Daniel's mother Denise, now single, gets the wrong idea and attempts to rekindle a romance with Ken; Ken rebuffs her advances and returns to Deirdre. Ken does stray in 2009, after meeting Martha Fraser (Stephanie Beacham); he falls in love with her, and in May, plans to leave with her. He cannot go through with it, and jilts Martha, returning to Deirdre. Eventually, he admits to the infidelity. Although Deirdre is angry, she forgives him as he had forgiven her fling with Dev; however, Deirdre later cheats on Ken again, kissing Lewis Archer (Nigel Havers). Relations are once again strained between Ken and Deirdre. The couple acknowledge their mutual unhappiness with their marriage but remain together.

In late August 2010, Norris Cole (Malcolm Hebden) discovers an unopened letter addressed to Ken, dating back to the 1960s. The letter is written by Ken's first girlfriend, Susan Cunningham (Patricia Shakesby), whom Ken had dated in 1960. Susan has a son named Lawrence (Linus Roache), who turns out to be Ken's child. Ken and Lawrence bond, which temporarily threatens Ken's relationship with his other son Peter. When Ken discovers that Lawrence is intolerant of the homosexuality of his own son, James (James Roache), Ken severs contact. Realising that he has been unappreciative and neglectful of Peter over the years, he makes an effort to bond, supporting him through his relationship and health problems that follow.

In December 2010, Peter is caught up in the Joinery Bar gas leak explosion, which results in an unforgettable tram crash as the explosion severs the tramline above. Ken is fearful that his son is going to die, and this almost happens when Peter goes into cardiac arrest, after marrying Leanne Battersby (Jane Danson) on his hospital bed; However, Peter survives. Ken supports Peter and Leanne as Peter struggles to regain a sense of reality, the explosion having left him paralysed, potentially for life. Meanwhile, James comes to stay with the Barlows for a while, with no-one knowing that his role in a soup kitchen in town is actually part of a scam. When Ken discovers this, James packs his things and leaves; Ken tries to make him stay but James pushes him out of the way, knocking him unconscious. Ken is not seriously hurt, though.

Ken doesn't know where his loyalties lie when Peter is found to be having an affair with Carla Connor (Alison King), and he is estranged from his son, Simon (Alex Bain). Ken is then shocked to discover that Peter has been indicted for the murder of Frank Foster (Andrew Lancel), who had been found not guilty of raping Carla. He tries to help but is pushed away. Eventually, it is found that Frank's mother Anne was the real culprit. She is given a custodial sentence, whilst Peter is free to go. In mid-2013, Ken leaves the street temporarily to look after his grandson Adam in Canada. (a plot devised due to actor William Roache being on leave after being arrested). He returns in August 2014 to find his family in chaos. Peter has been imprisoned for the murder of his secret lover Tina McIntyre (Michelle Keegan) and Tracy is engaged to Carla's brother Rob Donovan (Marc Baylis). Carla had been pregnant with Peter's baby but had a miscarriage after they separated and Deirdre has fallen apart at the prospect of dealing with all this on her own. Ken is infuriated that Deirdre did not tell him sooner about all this and sets out to clear Peter's name, only to find that the majority of residents on the street, including Simon, believes that Peter did kill Tina. Ken is not sure whom to believe anymore. He later discovers that Peter has sacked his lawyer and it becomes even more likely that he will be found guilty of the murder.

Deirdre goes to stay with her friend, Bev Unwin (Susie Blake), in October 2014, when it becomes clear the stress of the trial is destroying her. Peter is found guilty of the murder and sentenced to life in prison. However, the verdict is quickly reversed, when it is discovered that it was actually Rob who murdered Tina. Peter is released from prison but makes the decision to leave the street, as he has hardly anything keeping him around, which hurts Simon. Ken tries to make Peter change his mind, but he is adamant on leaving, so Ken respects his wishes and sees him off. At this point, Deirdre should have come home but called back to say she was staying with Bev a while longer, as one of her relatives had just died. In July 2015, Deirdre dies and Ken is absolutely devastated by this news. Liz announces Deirdre's death in The Rovers Return. Deirdre's funeral is held the week after. It is revealed that Deirdre would have been home earlier. However, news of Tracy and Tony's fling reached her and she was ashamed to come home and face Liz. As a result, Ken feels animosity toward Tracy for seemingly stealing Deirdre's last two months from him, when she could have been home when she died.

Ken later begins dating Nessa Warner (Sadie Shimmin), much to the disapproval of Rita and Emily. Tracy is deeply upset and accuses Ken of betraying Deirdre. Ken kicks Tracy out when he discovers that Tracy has seen her ex–fiancée Rob, who's in prison for murder. In early 2016, Ken dumps Nessa after finding out Nessa had an affair with her sister Cathy's late husband. In October 2016, Ken is shocked to see his son Peter. He accuses Peter of drinking and after their argument, Ken suffers a stroke and he is hospitalised.

In early 2017, Ken's son Daniel is offered a place at Oxford University. He decides not to go choosing to support his new girlfriend Sinead Tinker (Katie McGlynn), who fell pregnant. Ken later turns on Sinead saying she has trapped Daniel and blames her for his son not going to university, something that he wishes he had done in 1960. He realized that he had wasted his time being with Deirdre, and wishes that he had not married her, but truly loved her more than his other wives, despite her affair with men like Adam's father, Mike in 1983. He mentions to Audrey that he has chosen his adoptive daughter Tracy as his favourite, for her mother's true love, over his other children, despite her actions, and wanted to leave her in his will everything. After pushing his family away from him and making Sinead have a secret abortion Ken is pushed down the stairs and left for dead by an unknown assailant. He recovers from his injuries in hospital.

In early 2019, Ken begins a relationship with Audrey's frenemy Claudia Colby (Rula Lenska). In 2020, Ken decided to move away from the street for a new adventure and moved into the Stillwaters retirement complex with Claudia. After moving in, they were introduced to Charles Moore, the chairman of the residents' committee, and Ken also discovered his old friend Norris living at Stillwaters. After missing Eccles (his dog), he sneaks her in, but is caught by Charles who sues him for damages, soon after this incident, Eccles dies of a tumour, Norris informs Ken that he had heard Charles make a comment at Eccles' expense, making him go up against Charles for election for the head of the residence committee, Ken and Norris did some digging and discovered Charles's abuse of power, secretly stealing money from the residents and after exposing this, Ken won the vote, but he handed it over to Norris as he felt unsuited for the environment of Stillwaters. As Ken and Claudia agreed they both wanted different things, Ken left, ending up back at No.1 Coronation Street. After returning, Ken makes sporadic appearances throughout late 2020. He initially announced that he would sell No.1 Coronation Street which led to a bidding war between Tracy and Steve, and Peter and Carla. However, Ken eventually changes his mind.

== Appearances in other media ==
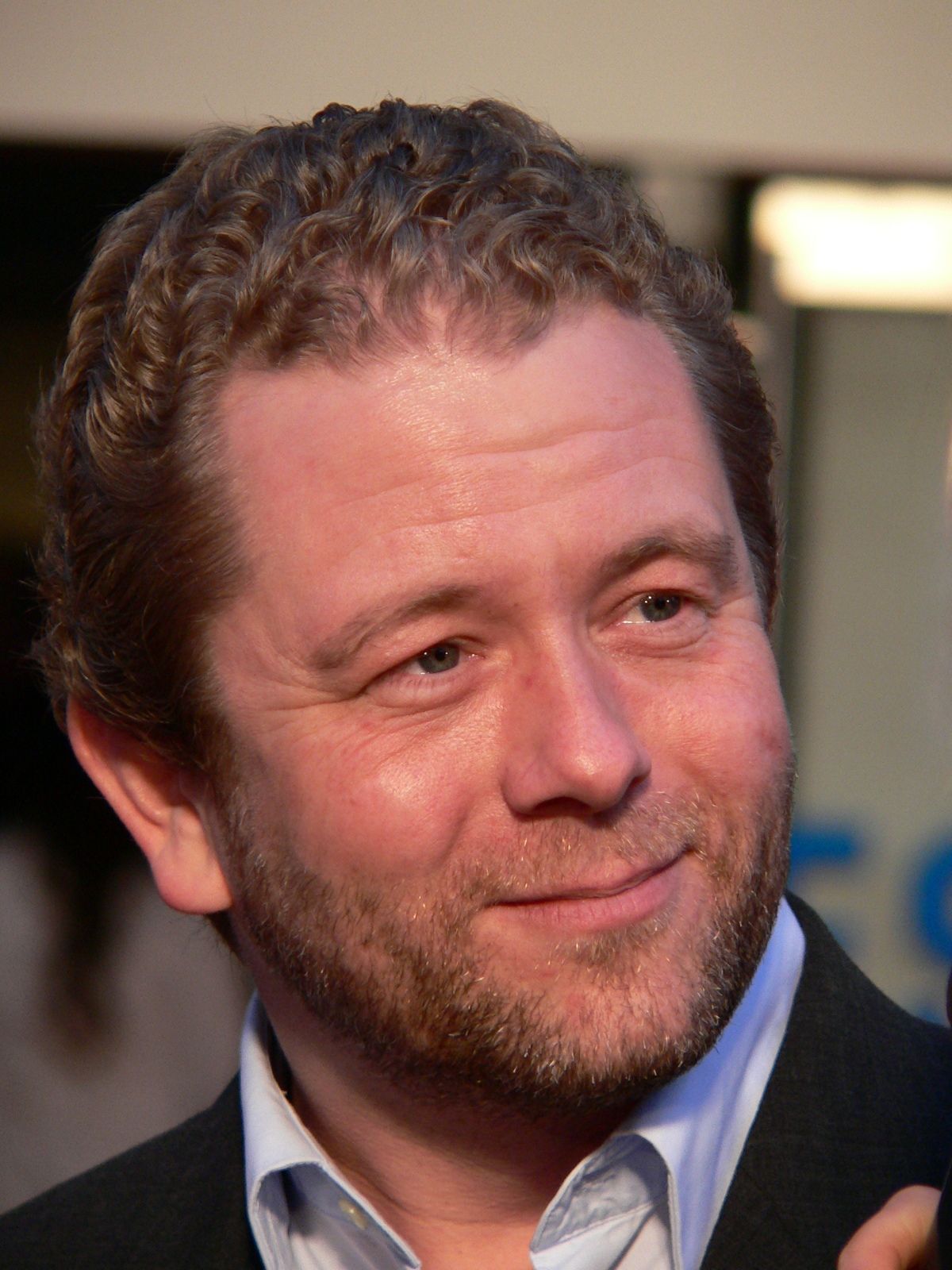
Impressionist Jon Culshaw has impersonated Ken Barlow for his sketch show.

In September 2010, coinciding with the 50th anniversary of Coronation Street, BBC Four aired a drama film titled The Road to Coronation Street, which depicted Tony Warren's struggle to get his soap opera commissioned, and the filming of its pilot. Roache himself (as well as playing the character Ken Barlow) appeared in the film and was portrayed by Roache's son, James.

In 2011, ITV filmed a spin-off web-based series featuring Ken and Deirdre, entitled Ken and Deirdre's Bedtime Stories. Created by Coronation Street writer Jonathan Harvey, the webisodes featured Ken and Deirdre mulling over the events of their day while in bed.

In 2010, a comedy play about Coronation Street was produced; titled Corrie!, it was penned by scriptwriter Jonathan Harvey. Ken Barlow was played by Simon Chadwick in the production. Harvey has suggested that when he researched the play, in the top five storylines for each of the 50 years of Coronation Street, three characters regularly featured—Ken, Deirdre and Gail Platt. Harvey therefore tried to shape the play around their journeys over the years.

In February 2011, Ken was among various Coronation Street characters to have his portrait auctioned for charity in the exhibition 'Behind the Street' at Manchester's Generation Pop Gallery. The black-and-white shots were taken by photographer Rob Evans, and raised £8,600 for charity. The highest bid on a photograph was for a shot of Ken, standing amongst rubble after the Weatherfield tram crash in 2010, a storyline marking the show's 50th anniversary. In 2010 ITV began selling Coronation Street merchandise featuring Ken, including gift wrap and novelty congratulations cards.

A parody song written about the character, entitled "Ken!", was included on Harry Hill's debut album, Funny Times. The track features vocals from Hill and Roache. Ken has been spoofed by Jon Culshaw in The Impressions Show, where he is having a secret affair with Pat Butcher from EastEnders, spoofed by Debra Stephenson. Culshaw wanted to include his impression of Ken in the show, saying "We were just looking for an excuse to get him in", so he decided that Ken and Pat would have a "secret romantic tryst at a motorway service station" somewhere between Weatherfield and the EastEnders' setting of Walford.

In May 2012, Trisha Ward's stage musical, Street of Dreams, debuted. The production, which is based on Coronation Street, featured Roache playing his on-screen alias, Ken, in a pre-recorded segment. Roache was one of several actors from the television series to feature in the musical. Others included Julie Goodyear, Kevin Kennedy and Brian Capron (who played Bet Lynch, Curly Watts and Richard Hillman respectively).

== Reception ==
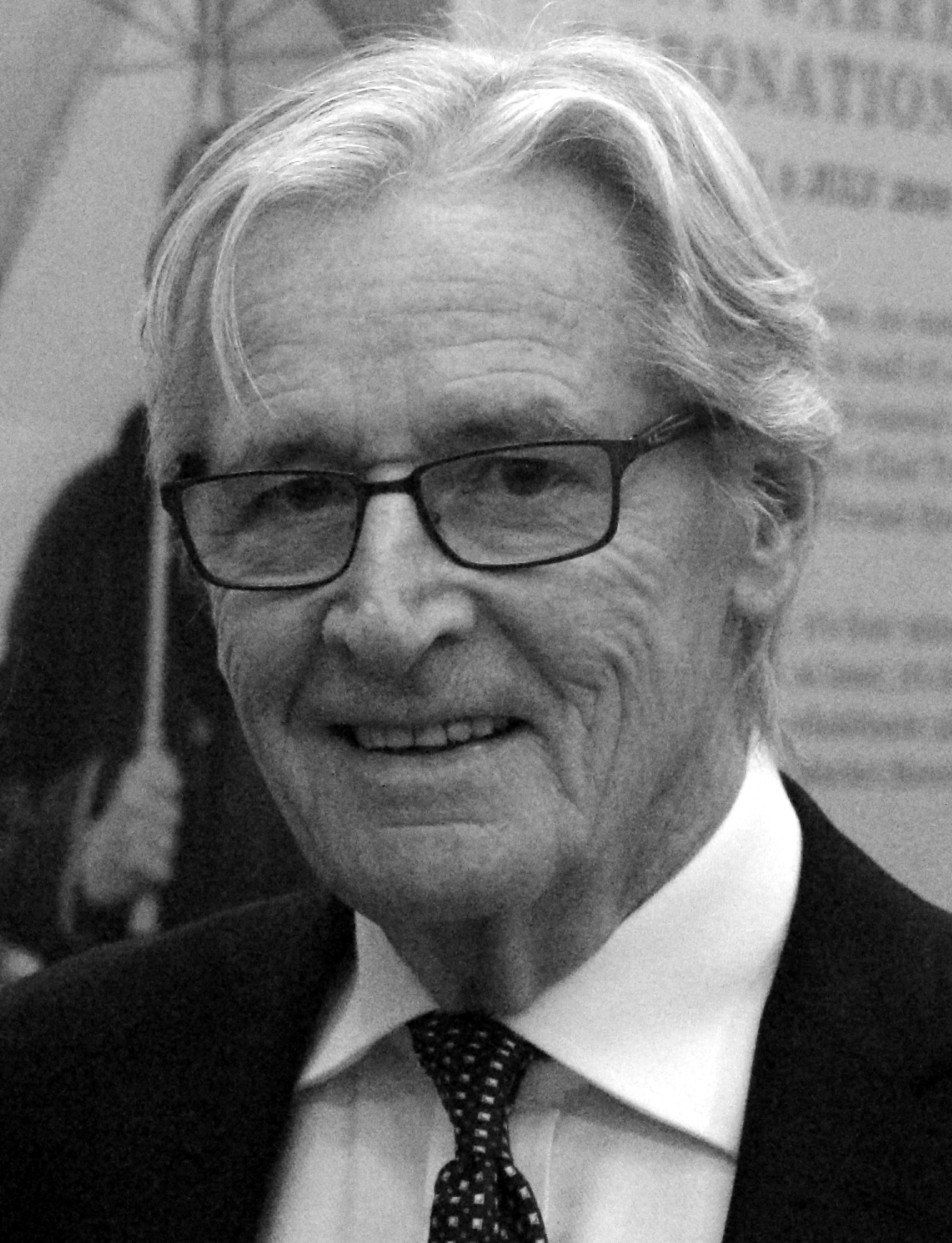
William Roache (pictured) received the first ever 'Lifetime Achievement' award at The British Soap Awards, for his role as Ken.

For his portrayal of Ken, Roache won the Lifetime Achievement award at The British Soap Awards 1999. In November 2010, Ken surpassed Bob Hughes (Don Hastings) from US soap opera As the World Turns to become the longest-serving soap opera actor. Roache was honoured at a Guinness World Records ceremony in New York. In 1983, Roache, Kirkbride, and Briggs were named TV Personalities of the Year at the Pye Colour Television Awards, for their performances in the Ken–Deirdre–Mike love triangle storyline. Journalist Brian Viner of The Independent has suggested that Roache has not been given the accolades he has deserved as a performer because of his longevity in the role of Ken. He felt that it may be a common assumption that Roache is merely playing himself on-screen; this notion diminishes a "rather remarkable acting performance." He added, "although the bouquets tend to go to actors who repeatedly display their versatility, it is in many ways even harder to inhabit one role for five decades. That said, for sheer staying power Ken and Bill are clearly indivisible: one has lived in the same street practically all his life, the other in the same role [...]. That we have been able to watch the evolution of that young man into the Ken Barlow we know today, no less self-righteous but with 50 years of experiences behind him, is frankly one of the wonders of British television."

Ken has a reputation for being boring. The British band Half Man Half Biscuit highlighted this point in their 2001 song "Lark Descending," comparing him unfavourably with a member of the US underground music scene, with the lyric: "I could have been like Lou Barlow, but I'm more like Ken Barlow". Despite Ken being fictional, critic Jim Shelley, writing for the Daily Mirror in 2009, labelled Ken "the most boring man you could ever meet". Roache sued for libel in 1990 when The Sun newspaper ran an article branding Ken boring and making allegations that Roache was disliked among the cast of Coronation Street. Roache said to the jury at the court case, "I felt extremely distressed. I could not believe those words had been written, that they had raked into my past. I broke out in a sweat. [...] They were saying that I was not doing my job, that I was a joke to the storyline writers, which is not true". Roache added in regard to Ken, "If people find someone who has had 23 girlfriends and three wives boring, that's fine by me." Roache won the case and was awarded £50,000; however, he was forced to pay legal costs, which bankrupted him. Brian Viner has suggested that it is remarkable that Ken has been labelled boring in spite of the many plots he has been involved with over the years. Brian Viner said, "It is easy enough to see, despite the extraordinary number of broken relationships and personal crises in his wake, why Ken tends not to make the pulse race when he opens his mouth. After all, he usually opens it only to drink halves of bitter, or to say something sensible or worthy. For 50 years he has been the nearest thing Weatherfield, the fictional area of Greater Manchester where Coronation Street is located, has had to a social conscience."

In a Channel 4 televised poll that was broadcast in 2001, Ken Barlow was voted the third most-hated TV character of all time, coming behind Phil Mitchell from EastEnders and Mr Blobby. In a Radio Times poll of over 5,000 people in 2004, 15% chose Ken as the soap character they would most like to see retired. He came second in the poll, behind EastEnders' Den Watts (17%).

Television personality Paul O'Grady wrote the foreword to Roache's 2010 autobiography, 50 Years on the Street. In it, he hailed Ken as "one of the iconic British soap characters", an all-time great who has been integral to Coronation Street. In 2005, Grace Dent of The Guardian suggested that Coronation Street archetypes have influenced latter soap opera characters. On Ken, she stated: "another heavily plagiarised Corrie stalwart is Ken Barlow, who as 'resident intellectual' has been looking down his nose at the proletariat since 1960. Just like poor hangdog-faced Ken, brainy people in soapland (Dr Truman [from EastEnders], Roy Cropper, Todd Grimshaw [both from Coronation Street], Emmerdale's Ethan the curate) are always miserable and brooding, due to the terrible burden of their mighty intellect in the face of so many simpletons. It rarely pays to be too clever or too rich in soapland as the majority of plotlines rely upon tragic Shakespearian falls from grace which everyone laughs their socks off at."

In 2009, viewers complained to ITV as well as the media regulator Ofcom after Coronation Street broadcast scenes in which Ken made derogatory comments about Christianity. A spokesperson for the show defended the opinions expressed by Ken in the scripts, saying, "Coronation Street is a soap opera set in modern society and therefore represents views from all side of the religious spectrum". The Guardian columnist Nancy Banks-Smith spoke highly of Ken's affair with Martha Fraser in 2009, calling it "a muted ingenious storyline". Gareth McLean of Radio Times was critical of the storyline: "When it comes to self-delusion, Ken takes the biscuit, claims the cake and wolfs down the éclair. Nursing the notion that he's been thwarted by life, he decides to leave Deirdre to sail off into the sunset – or possibly Runcorn – with Martha. All these years and Ken still doesn't realise it's not Deirdre who's the dead weight in his life, it's he himself." The BBC has said of him: "During his record-breaking time on the hit soap, Roache's character has led a life full of incident". Holy Soap suggested that Ken being labelled a gigolo in the local newspaper after his client, Babs, died halfway through eating her meal, was his most memorable moment. In her book Soap Opera, Hobson said Ken and his brother David initially represented the younger males of society. She noted that although Ken had many relationships, "he could hardly be described as an early 'Dirty Den'", a character notable for his womanising in the soap opera EastEnders.

== Bibliography ==
- Egan, Sean (25 September 2010). 50 Years of Coronation Street: The (Very) Unofficial Story. London: JR Books. ISBN 978-1-906779-80-1.
- Hobson, Dorothy (2003). Soap opera. Cambridge; Malden, MA: Wiley-Blackwell. ISBN 978-0-7456-2655-0.
- Hobson, Dorothy (2008). Channel 4: The Early Years and the Jeremy Isaacs Legacy. London: I.B. Tauris. ISBN 978-1-84511-613-2.
- Kay, Graeme (1991). Life in the Street. London: Boxtree. ISBN 978-1-85283-161-5.
- Little, Daran (1995). The Coronation Street Story. London: Boxtree. ISBN 978-0-7522-1019-3.
- Roache, William (1 October 2008). Soul on the Street. London: Hay House. ISBN 978-1-84850-015-0.
- Roache, William (7 October 2010). 50 Years on the Street: My Life with Ken Barlow. Edinburgh: Mainstream Publishing. ISBN 978-1-84596-655-3.
- Sharp, Rob (1996). The Official Coronation Street Annual 1997. World International. ISBN 978-0-7498-2815-8.
