= Deirdre Barlow =

Fictional character from Coronation Street

- Coronation Street character
- Portrayed by: Anne Kirkbride
- Duration: 1972–2014
- First appearance: Episode 1236; 20 November 1972
- Last appearance: Episode 8486; 8 October 2014
- Introduced by: Eric Prytherch
- Book appearances: Weatherfield Life; Coronation Street: The Complete Saga; Deirdre: A Life on Coronation Street
- Spin-off appearances: Ken and Deirdre's Bedtime Stories (2011)
In-universe information
- Other names: Deirdre Hunt; Deirdre Langton; Deirdre Rachid; Deirdre Ann Barlow
- Occupation: Secretary; Shop assistant; Caretaker; Factory manager; Councillor; Medical receptionist; HPP Engine Mechanic
- Father: Donald Hunt
- Mother: Blanche Hunt
- Husband: Ray Langton (1975–1978); Ken Barlow (1981–1992, 2005–2015); Samir Rachid (1994–1995)
- Daughters: Tracy Barlow
- Stepsons: Peter Barlow; Daniel Osbourne; Lawrence Cunningham
- Stepdaughters: Susan Barlow
- Granddaughters: Amy Barlow
- Grandmothers: Iris Linfield
- Aunts: Beryl Linfield; Irene Linfield
- First cousins: Bradley; Marion

Deirdre Barlow (also Hunt, Langton and Rachid) is a fictional character from the British ITV soap opera Coronation Street, played by Anne Kirkbride. She made her first screen appearance during the episode broadcast on 20 November 1972. Her final appearance was on 8 October 2014.

Kirkbride decided to take an extended break from the soap in autumn 2014 and last appeared on-screen on 8 October 2014. She died in January 2015 before she could return to work. The character of Deirdre was killed-off and given a farewell storyline on 8 July 2015, with her funeral taking place on 13 July 2015. An official book focusing on the character's history was released as a tribute for fans of the show in October 2015.

== Creation ==
=== Background ===
Deirdre was played by actress Anne Kirkbride from 1972 to 2014. Originally named Deirdre Hunt, her character's earliest screen appearances were as "a young 17 year old 'dolly bird', someone that liked a bit of fun". The character made an initial one-off appearance in episode 1236 on 20 November that year. The producers and writers were convinced that the character had more mileage and Kirkbride returned for a couple of appearances from episode 1272 on 26 March 1973 and as a contracted regular from episode 1288 on 21 May 1973.

Deirdre's trademarks included a gravelly, scratchy voice (intensified by actress Kirkbride's real-life chain smoking) and big glasses. She wore the same style of glasses for almost thirty years, before Dev Alahan crushed them with a box when she put them down for a second. Later, the frames were much smaller, and Kirkbride herself did not wear glasses away from the role, opting for contact lenses. The large glasses made a comedic reappearance when character Claire Peacock (Julia Haworth), who bore an uncanny resemblance to the young Deirdre, was also to wear the same style of spectacles.

=== Casting ===
After leaving Oldham Rep at the age of 17, Anne Kirkbride featured in a Granada TV play by Jack Rosenthal titled Another Sunday and Sweet F.A. (1972). Kirkbride then auditioned for a part in a pilot for a new Granada series, gaining the attention of Coronation Street's casting director who offered her a part in the show. She was first seen doing her part when character Elsie Tanner came into a pub to find husband Alan Howard drinking with Deirdre. Kirkbride said: "That was my first scene and I was petrified at the thought of coming into something I'd been watching since the age of seven." Kirkbride remained with the show until her death on 19 January 2015, although what turned out to be her last appearance was broadcast the previous October.

== Development ==
=== Relationship with Ken Barlow ===
Ken and Deirdre have been described as soap opera's version of Richard Burton and Elizabeth Taylor. Their relationship has featured various affairs, break-ups and reunions over the years. The couple's first marriage eventually disintegrated in the early 1990s, this time when Ken had an affair with colleague Wendy Crozier, a dalliance which ended in divorce for the Barlows. Ken was kicked out of home on New Year's Day 1990. Their on/off relationship continued, with each having various other liaisons, until producers decided to reunite Ken and Deirdre in 1999. Ken's and Deirdre's second marriage in 2005 was watched by an estimated 13 million viewers, compared to the nine million who watched the wedding of Prince Charles to Camilla Parker Bowles the following day. Coincidentally, Ken's and Deirdre's first wedding in 1981 was screened within 48 hours of Prince Charles and Princess Diana's wedding, and just as in 2005, the Barlow wedding attracted more viewers than the royal wedding.

=== "Free the Weatherfield One" campaign ===
When the story of Deirdre Rachid being jailed for fraud was aired in 1998, a public campaign developed in the UK. A campaign led by tabloid newspapers and the occasional graffiti artist, with the slogan of "Free the Weatherfield One!". Despite Rachid being a fictional character, politicians expressed their opinions on the story as if she had been imprisoned in real life. Prime Minister Tony Blair said that he would be commanding his Home Secretary, Jack Straw, to investigate the issue. William Hague, the then leader of the Conservative Party, announced that his party was also concerned about Rachid's treatment, stating that "The whole nation is deeply concerned about Deirdre, Conservatives as much as everyone else".

The "Free Deirdre Rachid" campaign was likened to the "Free George Jackson" campaign in 1984 after Brookside character George Jackson was falsely imprisoned for a warehouse robbery. In the story for Brookside, George served his sentence.

== Storylines ==
Deirdre first came to Weatherfield in November 1972.

At the age of eighteen, Deirdre goes on a date with Jimmy Frazer (John Barrie) for a while until she is introduced to his business partner Alan Howard (Alan Browning); she quickly loses interest in Jimmy and flirts with Alan instead. Local neighbour Elsie Howard (Pat Phoenix) finds them in the pub where they are drinking, and announces herself as Alan's wife. Deirdre then sets her sights on Billy Walker (Kenneth Farrington) and, despite the fact that he is nearly twenty years older than her, the pair grow close to the point of having a few dates together at The Rovers Return public house. Eventually they become engaged in 1974, much to the horror of Billy's domineering mother Annie (Doris Speed), who disapproves of Deirdre and sees her as a harlot. The wedding is meant to be a low-key matter paid for by Billy and scheduled for May the following year, but weeks away from the wedding, Deirdre begins to have doubts, wondering whether she is prepared to be tied down to Billy. She asks Billy for more time and he agrees, but a little while later he calls the engagement off and leaves to run a wine bar in Jersey.

Soon enough, Deirdre's typist skills are noticed by troublesome Ray Langton (Neville Buswell), and he hires her as a secretary in the builder's yard, but due to Ray's constant needling she resigns in June 1975 after they have a blazing row. However, the hate turns to feelings for him, and they marry in July. They later move into No. 5 Coronation Street in March 1976, shortly after their daughter Tracy (Christabel Finch) is born on 24 January 1977. After Deirdre is attacked by a rapist while walking home, she contemplates suicide, standing on the parapet of a motorway bridge and only snaps back to reality when a lorry driver asks her for directions. Her marriage to Ray fails, and by September 1978, he is having an affair with waitress Janice Stubbs (Angela Bruce). When Deirdre finds out, they decide to start afresh and emigrate to the Netherlands, where Ray has been offered a job, but at their farewell party two months later, Deirdre decides not to go and Ray leaves alone; they subsequently divorce. From then onwards Deirdre attempted to pursue other relationships and she even attempted to reconcile with Billy at one point, but none of them worked out in the end.

In 1979, Deirdre is touched when Sally Norton (Yvonne Nicholson) – who had been in the bed next to her when Deirdre was giving birth – brings Tracy a doll, but she makes excuses to stop Sally taking Tracy out. Later, Deirdre leaves Tracy outside the Rovers whilst she visits Annie for knitting patterns but they are disturbed by the sound of a crash and Deirdre finds a lorry outside has spilt a load of timber into the front of the Rovers, crushing the front of the pub. Deirdre hysterically claws at the timber screaming for Tracy, who she believed was underneath. Sally had been unstable since she had been persuaded by a social worker to put her daughter up for adoption shortly after the birth, and Deirdre later discovers she has taken Tracy, moments before the lorry crashed.

It was at this point Deirdre had started dating Ken Barlow (William Roache) and the two realized they are perfectely suited to each other. In January 1980, she strongly hints to Ken that if he proposed to her then she would not say no. This scares Ken away as he feels he is too old for her and he has been married twice already. A year later, she and Ken sought a reconciliation; this came under threat when Deirdre has a brief fling with Ray's colleague Dirk van der Stek (Lex van Delden) until she decides to end this liaison. After Dirk leaves, she goes out for a meal with Ken and they agree to see more of each other without getting tied down. In 1981, more than 24 million viewers watched Deirdre's wedding to Ken Barlow (which generated higher ratings for ITV than the wedding of Prince of Wales to Lady Diana Spencer). Ken adopts Ray and Deirdre's daughter, Tracy, and they live with Ken's uncle-in-law Albert Tatlock (Jack Howarth) at Number 1.

In February 1982, Deirdre suggests they have a baby but Ken firmly dismisses the idea. A few months later in May that year, there are a number of muggings in the area. Deirdre's suspicions centre on local boy Raymond Attwood (Joe Searby), a member of the youth club where Ken helps out, but Ken refuses to call the police, not wanting to betray Raymond's confidence until he has evidence. After The Rovers Return barmaid Betty Turpin (Betty Driver) is mugged, Deirdre goes against Ken's wishes – and Raymond turns out to be the mugger. Ken feels Deirdre has turned against him, but nevertheless agrees they should try for a baby.

In late-1982, however, the marriage gets into a trouble when Deirdre cheats on Ken and has an affair with his rival Mike Baldwin (Johnny Briggs); she previously dated Mike a few years ago and they had a mutual passion for each other before Deirdre decided that Ken suited her better. The story runs on into 1983 and ends up becoming a ratings winner, with the UK's newspapers giving the story much coverage. The episode in 1983 when she ends her affair with Mike and reconciles with Ken was the highest-rated episode and the news was so big it ended up being announced on the scoreboard during a Manchester United v Arsenal match at Old Trafford, with the words "Ken and Deirdre reunited. Ken 1 – Mike 0" leading to cheers from the spectators.

Years later, Deirdre is encouraged by Ken to contest THE local council elections as an independent candidate. Her candidacy is intended, by Ken at least, to split the vote in favour of the Labour candidate. However, Deirdre is unexpectedly elected; thus deposing her former employer Alf Roberts (Bryan Mosley), also the sitting Councillor, in the process. Early in her term, Deirdre's workload as a councillor causes tensions with Ken, and their marital woes are compounded by the professional conflicts that arise between them. As a local newspaper editor, Ken causes Deirdre political embarrassment by publishing damaging stories about Weatherfield Council, making use of council secretary Wendy Crozier (Roberta Kerr) as his mole, but Deirdre's reputation is tarnished. Wendy is sacked and Ken, feeling responsible, employs her as his secretary and begins an affair with her; which leads to Deirdre starting divorce proceedings in 1990. Deirdre dates plumber Dave Barton (David Beckett) and later conman Phil Jennings (Tommy Boyle), who tricks her into investing in his nightclub. After a series of gaffes and minor scandals, Deirdre loses her seat on Weatherfield Council to Alf in 1991. This ends her short but tumultuous career in local politics.

In 1994, Deirdre leaves to look after her ailing mother Blanche Hunt (Maggie Jones), foiling a potential reunion with Ken. This was a plot devised by the then-writers of the show, to allow actress Anne Kirkbride to go on medical leave for several months. She had been diagnosed with Non-Hodgkin's lymphoma, and needed time to recuperate.

When Deirdre returns, she hopes that she and Ken will reconcile, but is saddened to learn that not only did Ken end up sleeping with Denise Osbourne (Denise Black) while she was away but that Denise is now expecting Ken's baby. Needing a holiday, Deirdre goes to Morocco where she meets and falls in love with Samir Rachid (Al Nedjari). He comes back to Weatherfield, insisting their relationship is more than a holiday romance. To keep Samir in the UK, and not have him deported back to Morocco, Deirdre decides that she and Samir get married, despite him being nearly twenty years younger than her. They marry in November 1994, despite the disapproval of Deirdre's teenage daughter Tracy, at this point played by Dawn Acton. Deirdre and Samir decide to move to Morocco for the foreseeable future, leaving No. 1 Coronation Street in the capable hands of Mike Baldwin, so he can put the house up for sale.

A few months later and the day before Samir is due to donate a kidney to Tracy, he is attacked by thugs. Tracy had suffered kidney failure following a drugs overdose. In hospital, Deirdre keeps a vigil by his bedside, hoping that Samir will wake up and recover. Sadly, he slips away, leaving Deirdre devastated, but also angry, because of the cruel way he has been taken from her. A day later, the kidney transplant goes ahead and Tracy gradually makes a full recovery.

In 1997, Deirdre falls in love with Jon Lindsay (Owen Aaronovitch), who claims to be an airline pilot. Ken exposes Jon as a fraud after seeing him working at a tie shop at Manchester Airport. Jon claims that he was embarrassed to admit that he had lost his pilot's licence due to failing eyesight. Deirdre forgives Jon, unaware he is implicating her in his numerous financial scams. They split up after she finds out he is married – but when she tries to retrieve the money she gave Jon towards a mortgage, she is charged with theft. Jon portrays her as the brains behind the crime and Deirdre is found guilty of fraud, receiving a prison sentence of eighteen months while Jon walks free. While in prison, Deirdre meets her cellmate Jackie Dobbs (Margi Clarke) and they become friends. In the meantime both Ken and Mike, despite becoming sworn archenemies ever since the Deirdre 1983 love triangle scenario, work together to exonerate Deirdre and have Jon jailed for his crimes. Her case looks hopeless at first until a woman called Mary Docherty (Victoria Alcock), who has been previously tricked by Jon, backs up Deirdre's version of events; she is released and Jon is finally brought to justice. Mike comes to her rescue with legal fees and a place to stay, upsetting both Ken and Mike's wife Alma (Amanda Barrie). The traumas of the past year and Tracy's wedding to Robert Preston (Julian Kay) leads Deirdre to reunite with Ken in February 1999.

In January 2001, Ken tells Deirdre that his daughter Susan Barlow (Joanna Foster) had a child named Adam (Iain De Caestecker) and that the boy's father is Mike – having acquired the information from Ken's son and Susan's twin brother Peter (Chris Gascoyne) at the time. Deirdre incidentally causes Mike to learn the truth. Thereafter Susan dies in a car crash, Adam is injured, and Mike later gets custody of Adam to Ken's frustration.

On Christmas Day 2001, Deirdre becomes unhappy with Ken after having a row with him and Peter on separate occasions. She seeks comfort from shopkeeper Dev Alahan (Jimmi Harkishin) and they have a one-night stand, but the next day Dev makes it clear that he regrets what happened and they keep their liaison secret. After keeping the secret throughout 2002, however, Deirdre is forced to confess her fling with Dev in January after he begins dating her daughter Tracy (now played by Kate Ford) at that point. Ken is initially unhappy that Deirdre slept with Dev, but he steadily forgives her and they stay together.

In early-2005, Ray resurfaces in the UK. While both Deirdre and Tracy are at Weatherfield General Hospital, they spot him there. He announces that he is currently seeking treatment for stomach cancer. He also says that the cancer is terminal, and therefore the treatment he is receiving will only prolong his life for another six months at the most. Before he dies, he is determined to get to know his daughter Tracy a lot more, as she was only 20 months old when he left in 1978. He discovers that Tracy has a young daughter called Amy, and wants to be a part of her life as well.

On 8 April, Ken and Deirdre remarried. The marriage is supposed to coincide with the wedding of the Prince of Wales and Camilla Parker-Bowles, just as Ken and Deirdre's first marriage coincided with Charles and Diana's nuptials, but scheduling conflicts caused by Prince Charles' attendance at the funeral of Pope John Paul II result in one day's discrepancy. Nearly 12,000,000 people watch the television event, while only 9,000,000 watch the royal nuptials; Ken and Deirdre's second ratings victory against the royal family makes the national newspapers. The wedding reception is held at the Rovers Return. Ray attends and a few minutes later, during a conversation with Deirdre's mother Blanche, passes away, while sitting at one of the tables enjoying a drink.

Two years later, in early 2007, Deirdre's life is turned upside down once again, after Tracy bludgeons her boyfriend Charlie Stubbs (Bill Ward), to death. Tracy claims that it was only done in self-defence, but admits to Deirdre that she did murder him. Deirdre is nevertheless devastated when Tracy is found guilty, and sentenced to a minimum of fifteen years, after which her sentence would be reviewed by the parole board. After weeks of turmoil at Number 1 Coronation Street, Ken offers Deirdre a shocking ultimatum, announcing that, if she leaves the house, he will be gone by the time she gets back. True to his word, Ken leaves and begins rebuilding a relationship with both Denise and their estranged son Daniel Osbourne (Dominic Holmes). Deirdre, full of resentment, confronts Denise, and they row in front of an audience at the Rovers Return, an argument which results in Deirdre slapping Denise. Deirdre tries to mend her relationship with Ken and apologises for her behaviour but fails to convince him to come back to her; they are later reconciled.

In July 2009, Deirdre has to reapply for her job as a council employee when redundancies are announced. In August, she loses her job and confides in Betty that she does not know what to do. When Peter decides to open a bar with girlfriend, Leanne Battersby (Jane Danson), Ken is so against the idea that he calls a meeting at The Rovers and has an article written in a newspaper which also details Deirdre's relationship with Jon Lindsay and Tracy murdering Charlie. Deirdre and Ken fall out but Eileen Grimshaw (Sue Cleaver) helps them reconcile. In 2010, Deirdre has a row with Eileen's nemesis Gail McIntyre (Helen Worth) over family problems between them; Gail ends up throwing a pie in Deirdre's face. Ken, despite repeated requests by Deirdre to "do something", fails to come to her assistance. Earlier on, Deirdre is saddened that Blanche has died in Portugal. She and Ken are even more surprised to learn that Blanche had been romantically involved with a man called Arnold. Deirdre flies to Portugal to meet him, learning more about her mother's final days. At Blanche's funeral, she is happy to see Tracy and gives an emotional eulogy paying tribute to her mother's unique character. In September, she is disgusted to discover that Lawrence Cunningham (Linus Roache) is Ken's son and that Lawrence has a gay son James Cunningham (James Roache). Deirdre is delighted when Tracy is released from prison on Christmas Day 2010. Despite knowing about Tracy's manipulative personality, Deirdre supports her but she finds Tracy in a pool of blood on New Year's Day, with Steve McDonald (Simon Gregson), Amy's father, standing over her. When Tracy awakes from her coma, she claims that Steve's wife Becky (Katherine Kelly) is responsible for her injuries. When Ken doubts Tracy's word, Deirdre stands by her; Becky is arrested and questioned by the police. Tracy's lies are exposed again when her former friend Claire Peacock (Julia Haworth) admits she attacked Tracy in revenge for insulting her recently deceased husband, Ashley (Steven Arnold).

In August 2012, Tracy complains of stomach pains but no one believes her except Deirdre. Ken assumes that Tracy is making excuses so that they will look after Amy (now played by Elle Mulvaney) but are stunned to find that Tracy has collapsed of kidney failure, after she doesn't collect Amy from football training. Tracy is hospitalised and she apologises to Deirdre for all the trouble she has caused and that she is the only person who has repeatedly forgiven her for her mistakes. In April 2013, Ken leaves Weatherfield and flies to Canada to visit Adam (now played by Sam Robertson) who is seriously ill and it is revealed that Ken will be staying in Canada for the foreseeable future to aid Adam in his recovery. Whilst Ken was away, much changed: Peter's adversary Rob Donovan (Marc Baylis) has become Tracy's new love interest and has ended up cleaning out Peter's bookies, which in turn leads to the business shutting down. Tracy and Rob go on to rent the premises from Peter and set up Barlow's Buys which sells everything from televisions to jewellery. Deirdre is suspicious of Rob, particularly his intentions towards Tracy and their entire family. At the same time, however, she supports Peter's marriage with Rob's half-sister Carla Connor (Alison King) and attends their 2013 Christmas Day wedding.

As time moves on, Rob moves into No. 1 with Tracy and Deirdre, causing initial tension in the household. In May 2014, Deirdre is shocked to learn Peter had an affair with his son's babysitter Tina McIntyre (Michelle Keegan) for most of the year. Moments later, Tina is found dead after being pushed from the balcony in the builder's yard and then being hit over the head with a blunt object. Carla breaks up with Peter and he has to rely on Deirdre's support as she protests his innocence to the rest of the street. At Tina's funeral, Rob and Peter argue again as Rob urges Peter to admit that he killed Tina and that he ruined her life. Peter responds by saying "yeah well she ruined my life so that makes us even", which the other mourners take as a confession of guilt. Peter's defence team urge him to plead guilty, and Deirdre suggests that he do as they recommended. Peter then stops talking to Deirdre and refuses to see her in prison.

In August 2014, Ken returns to the street and Deirdre is happy to see him. She doesn't want to tell him about Peter's situation yet, but Ken ends up finding out from Carla rather than Deirdre herself. This leads to a major row between Ken and Deirdre, who says that he abandoned his family when they needed him most – further stating that her reservations about Rob have also changed because he has been a real rock for her and Tracy at the time. Ken goes to bed to sleep off his jet lag, but Deirdre continues weeping alone over the row; when Tracy and Rob return home, she falls into their arms crying as they console her. Ken forgives Deirdre and wants to take her on holiday. He orders a caravan so he can take Deirdre to North Wales; she is disappointed as she wanted to go abroad. The holiday is disastrous, and Ken takes her back home; Tracy reveals that Peter is drinking again, leaving Deirdre and Ken shocked. In October, Deirdre begins to struggle with the stress of the trial, and after Tracy and Carla argue during a meal she has prepared, she loses her temper and throws an unset trifle against the wall. Ken then suggests that she stay with her old friend Bev Unwin (Susie Blake) for a while, and Deirdre then leaves to stay with Bev until the trial is over. After the trial is over, she decides to stay longer as Bev's brother Lenny Baker has recently died.

It is not until July 2015 that Deirdre prepares to return to Coronation Street. Her family arrange a surprise sixtieth birthday party for her at The Rovers, but Bev arrives at the Barlow house to break the news that Deirdre has died, possibly after suffering a brain aneurysm, caused by her many years of chain smoking. Ken also hears from Bev that Deirdre was planning to return to him a few weeks earlier, but decided to stay longer as she felt humiliated about Tracy's affair with Liz's boyfriend Tony Stewart (Terence Maynard) earlier on. Deirdre's funeral takes place on 13 July and many turn up to pay their respects to her. While their longtime friend Emily Bishop (Eileen Derbyshire) is reading a poem, Ken snaps at Tracy.

In March 2017, Ken mentions Deirdre while arguing with Daniel's girlfriend Sinead Tinker (Katie McGlynn) over their relationship; Ken admits that although he deeply loved Deirdre, he was never fulfilled in their marriage due to their having such different personalities and expectations from life, such that he felt trapped. He said his life with Deirdre was not what he would have chosen as a young, ambitious man, and predicted that for the same reasons, Sinead would eventually cause similar resentment in his son if she did not see sense and break up with Daniel at his father's insistence.
