= List of Coronation Street characters introduced in 1983 =

This is a list of Coronation Street characters that made their first appearance in 1983.

== Robert Lowther ==
Robert Lowther
- Coronation Street character
- Portrayed by: David Scase
- Duration: 1983–1985, 1987
- First appearance: 23 March 1983
- Last appearance: 2 December 1987
- Introduced by: Mervyn Watson
In-universe information
- Occupation: Doctor
- Husband: Joan Lowther (1946-1987)

Doctor Robert Lowther, was the husband of Joan Lowther, who employed Hilda Ogden (Jean Alexander) as a part-time cleaner in their house on Oakfield Drive. He first appeared in March 1983. During the Second World War, Robert fought in the Western Desert. In May 1983, Robert and Joan visited No.13 Coronation Street, where Hilda lived whilst she was out, and Robert discovered that her husband, Stan Ogden (Bernard Youens) had fought alongside him in the Western Desert.

In 1985, after Stan had died, the Lowthers let Hilda house sit for them, however No. 13 was burgled whilst she was away. Hilda took pride in cleaning such a big house and was unhappy when Sally Seddon (Sally Dynevor) offended them whilst taking her place. Hilda and Joan became good friends and invited her and Robert to her and Stan's Ruby Wedding Anniversary in 1986, but Joan didn't attend as Audrey Roberts (Sue Nicholls) accidentally dyed her hair orange. In 1987, the Lowthers decided to retire to Hartingdon. Joan initially offered to recommend Hilda as a cleaner for the next occupants, but whilst they were packing, they were burgled and both ladies were attacked. Joan received a bump on the head and subsequently died in Weatherfield General Hospital, whereas Hilda survived. Grieving Robert didn't change his plans to retire and asked Hilda to come with him, which she accepted.

== Damian Ogden ==
Damian Ogden
- Coronation Street character
- Portrayed by: Neil Ratcliffe
- First appearance: 27 June 1983
- Last appearance: 29 June 1983
- Introduced by: H. V. Kershaw
In-universe information
- Father: Trevor Ogden
- Mother: Polly Ogden
- Sisters: Jayne Ogden
- Grandfathers: Stan Ogden
- Grandmothers: Hilda Ogden
- Uncles: Tony Ogden
- Aunts: Irma Barlow; Sylvia Ogden

Damian Ogden was the son of Trevor (Don Hawkins) and Polly Ogden (Mary Tamm) and grandson of Stan (Bernard Youens) and Hilda Ogden (Jean Alexander).

In June 1983, Trevor brought Damian to Weatherfield to stay with Stan and Hilda while he went to Chester for a job interview. The Ogdens were pleased to have Damian although Stan suspected Trevor had a hidden agenda as they'd recently received an inheritance from Hilda's brother, Archie Crabtree (John Stratton). Hilda hoped Stan was wrong but Trevor did indeed ask for a loan the next day, which Hilda refused.

In October 1986, Hilda was drafted in again when Trevor and Polly went on holiday for two weeks

== Percy Sugden ==
Percy Sugden played by Bill Waddington. He appeared between 1983 and 1997. The character was introduced to Coronation Street as a potential caretaker of the Community Centre. Percy's niece, Elaine Prior, stayed with him until she married Bill Webster (Peter Armitage). Percy was also a school traffic warden, and Phyllis Pearce (Jill Summers) came to respect him greatly after he was injured trying to protect her.

== Bob Statham ==
Bob Statham
- Coronation Street character
- Portrayed by: Michael Goldie
- Duration: 1983, 1987–1988
- First appearance: 26 September 1983
- Last appearance: 11 July 1988
- Introduced by: Mervyn Watson
In-universe information
- Occupation: Newspaper Editor
- Wife: Joan

Bob Statham was the owner of the Weatherfield Recorder Newspaper. He first appeared when he sold Ken Barlow (William Roache) a 33% share of the business, but became a sleeping partner as Ken became editor after the departure of Pamela Mitchell. Despite this, Statham did put his foot down when Ken wanted to write a critical article on Mike Baldwin's (Johnny Briggs), who had recently had an affair with his wife, Deirdre Barlow (Anne Kirkbride), Graffiti Club. Statham told Ken to write a positive article on Baldwin's club, which caused Ken hurt after the recent events that took place.

In 1987, Statham returned again when Alf Roberts (Bryan Mosley) contacted him to complain about Ken using the Recorder to help his campaign for standing at the council against him. Statham didn't approve but Ken wasn't put off. When an angry Councillor pulled out of advertising, Statham stepped in and told Ken that there was a conflict of interest and that he would have to either withdraw from the election or he'd buy him out of the Recorder. Ken backed down but as Deirdre took his place in the campaign, she beat Alf. In 1988, Statham retired to Spain after asking Ken to make him an offer on his shares, which he did offering £30,000

== Sally Waterman ==
Sally Waterman
- Coronation Street character
- Portrayed by: Vikki Chambers
- Duration: 1983–1985
- First appearance: 28 September 1983
- Last appearance: 27 February 1985
- Introduced by: Mervyn Watson
In-universe information
- Occupation: Secretary; Newspaper Reporter

Sally Waterman was originally the secretary for Bob Statham (Michael Goldie) at Weatherfield Recorder when Ken Barlow (William Roache) bought a 33% share of the business in November 1983. Sally worked alongside Ken in the office. Ken and Sally clashed when he wouldn't advertise Mike Baldwin's (Johnny Briggs) new Graffiti Club due to him having an affair with his wife, Deirdre Barlow (Anne Kirkbride). When Ken wrote an underwhelming article on Mike, she reported it to Statham, who forced Ken to write a positive article.

In January 1984, Ken saw potential in Sally, who had never written for a paper before, and got her an interview with Stan (Bernard Youens) and Hilda Ogden (Jean Alexander) regarding a compensation claim they made against the council after Stan stubbed his toe on uneven paving slabs. In February 1985, after writing articles for many residents of Weatherfield, Sally applied for a trainee reporter role at the Weatherfield Gazette. She subsequently handed her notice in with Ken.

== Kevin Webster ==
Kevin John Webster is a fictional character in the UK television ITV soap opera Coronation Street. Portrayed by actor Michael Le Vell, the character first appeared onscreen during the episode airing on 19 October 1983. Le Vell was suspended from the soap in 2013 due to allegations of sexual offences, with scenes he had already filmed cut from broadcast. Le Vell was found not guilty of all charges in September 2013, and briefly returned in early 2014, before taking another 3-month break from the show and returning once again.

== Mark Redman ==
Mark Redman
- Coronation Street character
- Portrayed by: Thomas Hawkeswood (1983); Christopher Oakes (1986); Michael Bolstridge (1991); Christopher Cook (1992–1996); Paul Fox (1999–2006)
- Duration: 1983, 1986, 1991–1994, 1996, 1999–2001, 2006
- First appearance: 31 October 1983
- Last appearance: 17 April 2006
- Introduced by: Mervyn Watson (1983); John G. Temple (1986); Carolyn Reynolds (1991); Brian Park (1996); Jane MacNaught (1999); Steve Frost (2006)
In-universe information
- Occupation: Pub Landlord
- Father: Mike Baldwin
- Mother: Maggie Dunlop
- Adoptive father: Harry Redman
- Stepmother: Susan Barlow (1986–1988); Jackie Ingram (1991); Alma Halliwell (1992–1999)
- Half-brothers: Danny Baldwin; Adam Barlow
- Grandfathers: Frank Baldwin
- Grandmothers: Mary Baldwin
- Uncles: Harry Baldwin
- Nephews: Jamie Baldwin; Warren Baldwin
- Other relatives: Frankie Baldwin (sister-in law, 1986–2006)

Mark Redman (also Dunlop) made his first appearance on 31 October 1983. He is the son of long-running character Mike Baldwin and Maggie Dunlop. He was played by Thomas Hawkeswood from 1983 till 1984, by Christopher Oakes in 1986, Michael Bolstridge in 1991 and then by Christopher Cook from 1992 till 1996 and then most recently Paul Fox from 1999 till 2006. He first appeared during the episode airing on 31 October 1983 and last appeared on 17 April 2006.

Maggie married Harry Redman soon after splitting up with Mike and Harry brought up Mark as his son. Mike found out about Mark after Harry's death and he started interfering with Mark's and his mother's lives, paying for Mark to go to Oakhill Grammar School and alienating him from his old friends. Mark was relieved to move to Felixstowe when his mother remarried.

After leaving school, Mark returned to Weatherfield in 1999 to see his father and stayed for a while, helping out in the factory, but fell in love with Mike's fiancée, Linda Sykes. They began an affair in the new year and both became partners in the company. Mark tried to make it work but it was too much and he eventually decided to leave Weatherfield again, for Amsterdam, agreeing to return for the wedding. When he did, the secret came out on the wedding day and Mike was furious. He told Mark to leave and never come back. While things went on to be slightly friendlier between them, their relationship never entirely recovered and Mark moved to Holland soon after.

By 2006, Mark was living with his girlfriend in Doncaster and estranged from his father. He was shocked to find a confused Mike on his doorstep, unaware that his father now had Alzheimer's disease. Mike initially believed Mark to be his youngest son, Mike later remembered that Adam Barlow was his youngest son, but upon remembering Mark's affair with Linda, he left. Later that week, Mike died of a heart attack and Mark attended his funeral from a distance. Afterwards, he visited the factory and introduced himself to Adam. When Adam explained that Mike's older son Danny Baldwin had used Mike's illness to get him to leave him everything in his will, Mark urged Adam to contest it.
