= Alma Baldwin =

Fictional character from Coronation Street

- Coronation Street character
- Portrayed by: Amanda Barrie
- Duration: 1981–1982, 1988–2001
- First appearance: Episode 2110; 22 June 1981
- Last appearance: Episode 5060; 20 June 2001
- Introduced by: Bill Podmore (1981, 1988); Mervyn Watson (1989)
In-universe information
- Other names: Alma Sedgewick; Alma Halliwell
- Occupation: Caterer; Café owner Assistant supermarket manager
- Father: George Halliwell
- Mother: Florrie Halliwell
- Sisters: Kath Simpson
- Husband: Jim Sedgewick (until 1982); Mike Baldwin (1992–2000)
- Stepsons: Mark Redman; Danny Baldwin
- First cousins: Richard Hillman

Alma Baldwin (also Sedgewick and Halliwell) is a fictional character from the British ITV soap opera Coronation Street, played by Amanda Barrie. She was originally introduced as a recurring character from 1981 to 1982 before later becoming a regular character from 1988 to 2001.

During her time on the show, Alma was best-known for her long-running problematic marriage with established character Mike Baldwin (Johnny Briggs) that occurred throughout the majority of the 1990s. She was also featured in other high-profile storylines that included her brief relationship with Mike's love rival/sworn archenemy Ken Barlow (William Roache); having close friendships with both longtime companion Audrey Roberts (Sue Nicholls) and the latter's daughter Gail Platt (Helen Worth) respectively; getting romantically seduced by Audrey's estranged son Stephen Reid (Todd Boyce); being kidnapped by Mike's other nemesis Don Brennan (Geoffrey Hinsliff) that ended when he drove her in his taxi into a canal; growing jealous of Mike's romantic feelings for Ken's beloved spouse Deirdre Barlow (Anne Kirkbride); and finding herself caught up in a supermarket robbery siege. Eventually Barrie decided to leave the soap in 2001, and Alma was ultimately killed-off in a cervical cancer storyline.

== Creation and casting ==
Alma was introduced in 1981 as a recurring/guest character, the wife of café proprietor Jim Sedgewick. The role saw the return to mainstream television for actress Amanda Barrie, who was previously best known to viewers as Cleopatra in the 1964 comedy film Carry On Cleo. Barrie played Alma in a recurring role for a year, and then, after six years away from the show, she was asked to return as a regular character, Alma taking over control of the café she was given in her divorce settlement from Jim. Barrie has recalled that her first scene was opposite a Coronation Street "legend", Elsie Tanner, played by Pat Phoenix: "She came for a job at the café and I had to tell her she couldn't have one. That was quite scary. It was my first episode but I didn't think the Street took me to its heart because I wasn't called for another eight years. By that time, Jim had gone - I never actually met him!" After Alma's reintroduction as a regular, the British press labelled her as "the next Elsie Tanner", a comparison that Barrie refuted: "I think they always do that. There was only one Elsie Tanner, and I think they will go on looking." Barrie has revealed that it was thanks to her mother that she was given a permanent role in Coronation Street. According to the actress, she "bombarded" Granada studio with calls pretending to be a series of fans requesting that Alma be brought back, even speaking directly with producer Bill Podmore.

== Development ==
=== Relationships ===
The character went into a business partnership with Gail Platt (Helen Worth), formed a close friendship with Audrey Roberts (Sue Nicholls), and had several romantic relationships most notably with Mike Baldwin (Johnny Briggs).

Alma and Mike's romance stemmed back to 1989 and they wed on-screen in 1992, the marriage lasting seven years. It has been suggested in a 2006 ITV documentary that Mike, an antagonistic womanising character, met his match in Alma. William Roache who plays Ken Barlow has stated that of all Mike's many women in the serial, he always felt that Alma was Mike's true love, the one that was right and good for him. Briggs has stated that he always enjoyed watching the scenes between Mike and Alma, because Alma knew how to handle Mike. Barrie has discussed the way she approached playing the romance between Mike and Alma, suggesting that as Alma she treated Mike in the same way that she [Barrie] treated Briggs off-set, poking fun at him.

Barrie has suggested that she and her co-star Sue Nicholls who plays Audrey Roberts share a friendship that emulates the screen friendship between their two characters. She commented, "Sue Nicholls, who plays Audrey Roberts, is one of my best friends in the Street. We're all so close that we instinctively know how each other is feeling on any given day and we even know how the others will play each scene. If I'm reading a script I can actually hear Sue's voice saying her part, and what expression she will use."

=== Kidnapping (1997) ===
One of the character's most notable storylines was her kidnapping by Don Brennan (Geoffrey Hinsliff), who attempted to kill Alma by driving her into the River Irwell in a bid for revenge on Mike Baldwin. The events were screened in an hour long special in 1997. The episode ended on a cliffhanger and viewers were left guessing as to whether Alma and Don had survived the crash. Both characters survived, but the storyline marked the exit of Don, who had been written out of the soap. More than 15 million viewers watched the episode.

=== Cervical cancer and death (2001) ===
In November 2000 it was announced that Barrie had decided to leave the programme. She stated, "I thought it was about time I bowed out in the hope that there's one more show in me. I want to endlessly thank Granada and Coronation Street. I've had a very happy time and I feel blessed and proud to have been in the show. But everything has its time. I feel it's time to hand over to the youngsters in the show, who I think are so brilliant [...] I thought it was about time I bowed out. This is something I've been thinking about for ages but couldn't face up to the emotion of leaving or tear myself away." Executive producer Jane Macnaught commented, "We are sorry to see Amanda go and wish her well for the future. She has been a much-loved character and we truly appreciate her loyalty and commitment to the show. I respect her decision and appreciate that she feels she has to move on. We will now work on an exciting exit for the character."

Producers opted to kill off Alma in the serial with terminal cervical cancer, which had already spread to her other organs before detection. A source reported to The Mirror, "we believe Alma's sad death has every ingredient to make it one of the all-time Coronation Street greats." As a precursor to the storyline, Alma had begun a romance with a security guard Frank O'Connor (Eamon Boland) and both had decided to leave Weatherfield to begin a new life together. Discussing the storyline, the source said, "Alma agrees to go and live with Frank. They decide to make a new start together somewhere in the country and begin excitedly telling their plans to people back home. Alma has had her fair share of ups and downs with men in the past and she sees Frank a dependable chap to see out her days with. There's even a surprise farewell party planned at the Rovers. But just as it looks as if they are off into the wide blue yonder the devastating news hits Alma." In the scripts, Alma was faced with a choice, leave Weatherfield, or remain and die with her friends. The source added, "Alma is wrestling with her innermost thoughts about what to do for the best. She is agonising about starting a new life away from Weatherfield with Frank and his children Joe and Danny. But it is Audrey who tells her that she should stay amongst her friends who will be able to nurse her when the time comes. After a lot of hard thinking Alma realises that she will be better off staying with the people who have known and loved her. So she makes the emotional decision to remain with her friends until she dies. We have had some tear-jerking episodes in the past, and Alma's farewell will have to rank as one of the most sorrowful in Corrie's history."

An estimated 15 million viewers tuned in to see Alma's death on-screen. It was reported that a power surge occurred at the episode's climax as there was a 1000 megawatt demand on the National Grid as more than 400,000 kettles were switched on by viewers after the episode. A National Grid spokesman said "Soaps normally average between 400 and 600 megawatts, so it was a considerable increase."

Cancer Research UK was critical of the cervical cancer storyline. They suggested that the writers tried to write the disease around the plot rather than the other way around, leading to unrealistic depiction of cancer. A spokesman for Coronation Street responded in defence of the storyline, saying that Alma's cancer progressed so quickly as she had missed a smear test, and the storyline did have a positive impact on female viewers, resulting in a significant increase in smear testing in the UK. However, a British Medical Journal paper in 2003 warned that the storyline could have unduly worried audiences and placed a burden on the National Health Service (NHS).

== Storylines ==
Alma Halliwell is first introduced in 1981 as the wife of cafe owner, Jim Sedgewick (Michael O'Hagan). The marriage is a disaster and when Alma falls pregnant a year later, she has an abortion rather than bring a child into their loveless home. Alma takes over Jim's Café after they divorce in 1982. She emigrates to Florida for a while with a pools winner named Phillip but when he squanders the money, Alma returns to Weatherfield. The character properly begins to make an impact when she takes a more active role in the management of the café in late 1988. This is the beginning of a long-running working relationship with local resident Gail Tilsley (Helen Worth), who becomes Alma's business partner in 1989 and it ended when Alma sells her share to fellow neighbour Roy Cropper (David Neilson) in 1996. Nevertheless, Alma remains one of Gail's closest friends and also forms a strong companionship with Gail's mother Audrey Roberts (Sue Nicholls) at the same time.

Soon enough, Alma gets acquainted with local businessman Mike Baldwin (Johnny Briggs). They have a tempestuous on-off relationship when the pair started dating each other, but then Mike dumped Alma and went on to marry his partner Jackie Ingram (Shirin Taylor) in 1990. It was then Alma began dating Mike's love rival and sworn archenemy Ken Barlow (William Roache), but she is seduced by Mike after he decides he wants her back and her relationship with Ken dissolves. Alma and Mike marry in 1992. Their marriage, while longstanding, proves to be complicated - as Alma is often the motherly and sympathetic liberal-minded character in many events that see her off-setting Mike's frequent harsh and high-minded attitudes. As such, Mike's patronising and chauvinistic mannerisms alienate Alma at times; she occasionally rebels, buying herself a 1979 MG Midget convertible and seeking employment against his wishes. Then in 1996, Mike plans to go into business partnership with Stephen Reid (Todd Boyce); the latter being Audrey's estranged son and Gail's long-lost brother. Alma soon becomes attracted to Strphan and makes a pass at him, only to get rebuffed and she is left further distraught when Mike responds with nonchalance to the incident. However, when Stephan later attempts to use Alma to make Mike jealous, she slaps him and reconciles with Mike.

In 1997, Alma finds herself caught in the crossfire of Mike's dangerous quarrel with his other nemesis Don Brennan (Geoffrey Hinsliff). She mostly felt sympathy for Don after learning that Mike had sold him a garage business at a knowingly inflated price and then watched as Don lost everything after going bankrupt. Don eventually has a breakdown and became obsessed with revenge on Mike - going as far as to impulsively tell Alma that she is just as much to blame for his plight as her husband is due to fact that she is currently Mike's wife. Later on, Don decided to target Alma after his attempt to frame Mike for both arson and insurance fraud had backfired. When Alma calls a taxi to return home after a night out with her friends, Don kidnaps her and she becomes increasingly unnerved by his disturbing mannerisms. Alma's attempt to appeal to Don's good nature is unsuccessful and he attempts to kill her by driving the taxi with her as his passenger into a canal; both survive and Don is held in police custody whilst Alma is nursed back to health by Mike and Gail over her ordeal. Months later, however, Don is admitted to hospital and is dying of cancer. He requests for Alma to visit him so he can make peace with her; she does so and forgives him, much to Mike's chargin. However, Don later escapes from custody and he begins stalking Alma at work. Mike calls the police on Don when he finds out about it, but is frustrated when the police are unable to provide Alma protection from Don's potential wrath. However, it soon turns out that Don was merely seeking out Mike as he has resolved to kill him at all costs. Don ambushes Mike at his factory and attempts to kill him by stealing Alma's car before driving the vehicle at her husband; Mike dodges and Don ends up driving the car into a viaduct, which causes the vehicle to explode and Don is killed as Mike watches on in amazement.

From then onwards, Alma begins to settle her marriage with Mike. But she soon becomes jealous of Mike's passionate feelings for Ken's old spouse Deirdre Rachid (Anne Kirkbride), especially as Mike previously had an affair with Deirdre while she was still married to Ken - which in turn led to the long-running feud between Ken and Mike that has gone on for decades up to the point where Alma became involved in the scenario. This is mainly the case in 1998 when Mike is forced to team up with Ken to exonerate Deirdre after she is framed and later wrongfully jailed for committing fraud; though Alma supports the two men in their efforts to help Deirdre, she feels unhappy at the prospect that Mike is treating her second best in contrast to his feelings for Deirdre. However, once Deirdre has been exonerated, Mike assures Alma that he loves her and they once again reconcile. But then their marriage ends a year later in 1999 when Alma discovers that Mike has cheated on her; she subsequently breaks up with Mike and they divorce afterwards.

Following the end of her marriage with Mike and ignoring his efforts to win her back, Alma moves in with Audrey and manages to find employment at the local Freshco supermarket, Alma excels in the job and is promoted. But then in 2000 she is taken hostage alongside many others, including both Mike and Ken, in an armed siege that ended when one gunman is shot dead by the police. Following this, Alma grows romantically close to a Freshco security guard named Frank and they consider leaving the county to start anew together. But their happiness is cut short when Alma makes an upsetting discovery about herself - due to a missed smear test and a further misdiagnosis, she has inoperable terminal cervical cancer. When Frank learns about this, he cannot face watching her die and leaves the street for good. But then Alma is supported by her friends when they find out about her cancer. When Mike eventually finds out, he decides to spend some time with Alma when it becomes clear that the two genuinely loved each other despite how their marriage ended. Alma eventually opts to die at home with the people she loves. At one point she summons Mike and Ken to request that they call a truce and end their rivalry, to which the two men agree to do on her behalf. A few hours later, Alma ultimately succumbs to her condition and dies in front of her loved ones; she passes away at Audrey's home, 5 Grasmere Drive on 17 June 2001, aged 55, with Mike and her friends surrounding her.

Following her death, Alma's funeral takes place just days later and at her wake Audrey plays a goodbye video she'd taken shortly before her death.
