= Rob Donovan =

Fictional character from Coronation Street

- Coronation Street character
- Portrayed by: Marc Baylis
- Duration: 2012–2017, 2025
- First appearance: 9 July 2012
- Last appearance: 26 March 2025
- Introduced by: Phil Collinson (2012); Stuart Blackburn (2015); Kate Oates (2017); Kate Brooks (2025)
In-universe information
- Occupation: Criminal; Factory Manager; Businessman; Pawnbroker
- Mother: Sharon Donovan
- Half-sisters: Carla Connor
- Sons: Bobby Crawford
- Daughters: Connie Waring

Rob Donovan is a fictional character from the British ITV soap opera Coronation Street, played by Marc Baylis. Introduced as the brother of Carla Connor (Alison King), he made his first screen appearance during the episode broadcast on 9 July 2012. It was announced in June 2014 that Baylis would be leaving the role after two years following his involvement in a storyline where Rob was responsible for murdering Tina McIntyre (Michelle Keegan). Rob departed on 5 November 2014. It was reported in August 2015 that Baylis would be reprising the role as Rob, and he returned to filming in October for a short storyline. His return aired on 4 December 2015 and he departed a month later, on 4 January 2016. He returned again on 19 April 2017 and departed on 8 May 2017. Rob returned once again in January 2025.

== Creation and development ==
Rob is the estranged brother of Carla Connor (Alison King). Rob was originally named "Darren" and had previously been mentioned in the series and by cast and crew members during interviews. He was not in Carla's life as he was serving an eight-year stint in Strangeways prison for armed robbery. In 2008, the serial's executive producer Kim Crowther told Kris Green from Digital Spy that her team had discussed the character. She said that there were no plans to introduce him, but it was likely that he would appear in the future. While King told Green that she imagined Carla's brother to be "stunningly charming, but a complete minger inside". She explained that he was likely to be "rough as old boots" because they are from a "really rough family". She added that Carla would have "a brother who's absolutely brilliant with her". Coronation Street fans later got the wrong impression that Luke Strong (Craig Kelly) was Carla's brother. In 2010, King told Green that she always expressed her interest in him joining the series but nothing came of it. She said that she would like him to come and live with Carla and "get off with" Michelle Connor (Kym Marsh).

=== Casting ===
In March 2012, the serial announced that their intention to introduce Rob and started the casting process. A Coronation Street representative said that they were going to see "lots of different actors" audition for the role. They also planned "exciting storylines" because fans had "been keen to meet [Rob] for some time". A writer from itv.com said that Rob will "turn heads and break hearts as the new moody bad lad of the Street". Rob will "ruffle a few feathers" and "waste no time in setting his sights on some of Coronation Street's most eligible women". Among those who auditioned for the role was Jamie Lomas; while actor Marc Bannerman also expressed his interest in the part. However, Baylis was cast in the role and his casting was announced on 3 May 2012. Of joining the soap, Baylis said "I feel incredibly honoured to be joining the very talented cast of Coronation Street. Rob is an exciting character to play and I am hoping he is going to ruffle a few Weatherfield feathers." Coronation Street's producer Phil Collinson added that he was pleased to welcome Baylis to the cast and branded him "the latest in a long line of handsome Corrie charmers." Collinson said Rob would "set hearts fluttering" and he soon develops a reputation as a ladies man, especially when he sets his sights on Eva Price (Catherine Tyldesley). A writer for itv.com's official Coronation Street website described Rob as "a bit of a rogue with a twinkle in his eye", while Collinson called him a "handsome bad boy". When asked by Digital Spy's Daniel Kilkelly about the character's name, Collinson revealed that Darren is Rob's middle name and that Carla does not have another brother.

=== Departure and returns ===
On 16 June 2014, it was announced that Baylis would be leaving his role as Rob towards the end of year and won't be being killed off. He will be leaving at the same time as Carla's husband, Peter Barlow (Chris Gascoyne) so fans will be left wondering which man is punished for the murder of Tina McIntyre (Michelle Keegan) - the crime that Rob committed. Baylis spoke about his exit, "Chris and I are both leaving at the end of the year, around the same time. This is why we can't talk openly about it because it doesn't give anything away. It entices everyone a little bit more. We're trying to keep it as open as possible so it's fortunate that we are both moving on to pastures new." Talking about his departure from the soap, he said, "It is with a heavy heart that I move on, but it is an experience that I will treasure forever."

In August 2015, it was revealed that Baylis would reprise the role of Rob later the same year, his return 'rumbled' the cobbles residents despite being in prison. In March 2017 filming began for a second return stint. In January 2025, it was revealed that Rob would be one of the characters set to return to the cobbles.

== Storylines ==
Rob arrives in Weatherfield after being in prison and he seeks Carla's help to make a fresh start. When Carla and Peter leave Weatherfield for Los Angeles, Rob steps in to help Michelle Connor (Kym Marsh) run the factory. Shortly after Carla and Peter return for Christmas, Carla announces that she is going back to Los Angeles and selling the factory to the highest bidder. Knowing that he cannot find the money to make a bid, Rob falsifies the accounts so the broker gives them a low valuation. When Carla returns for good, Rob and Michelle worry they will be caught out. Carla does find out and sacks Rob, threatening to report him for fraud. Rob goes into business for himself, stealing clients and orders from Underworld. Realising that she cannot beat him, Carla offers Rob's 30% share in the factory, much to Michelle's annoyance. Rob begins dating Tracy Barlow (Kate Ford); they stay at No. 1 Coronation Street with Deirdre Barlow (Anne Kirkbride) and run a shop, Barlow's Buys, on the site where Barlow's Bookies used to be. After becoming engaged, Rob and Tracy embark on a series of illegal schemes, which are witnessed by Tina McIntyre (Michelle Keegan). Rob also discovers that Tina is having an affair with Peter behind a pregnant Carla's back. On the night of his engagement party, Rob visits Tina and asks her not to tell Carla about the affair, as it will ruin her happiness. Tina refuses and threatens to expose his scams. Rob chases her up to the balcony of the building yard and pushes her, causing her to lose her balance and fall onto the cobbles below. To Rob's horror, Tina survives the fall, but when she threatens to go to the police, Rob beats her with a metal pipe and she dies in hospital the following week.

Feeling guilty and angry with Peter, Rob plans to frame him for Tina's murder. Peter is sentenced to life imprisonment, but after Carla told the police the truth, Rob flees Weatherfield. He asks Tracy to run away with him, but she calls the police herself. A devastated Rob disowns both Carla and Tracy, and gives himself up to the police. A month later, he is sentenced to 25 years imprisonment.

Rob requests a visit from Tracy and tells his unnamed prison cellmate that he plans for revenge on Tracy and Carla of how they disowned him and how they called the police and had him imprisoned. After Tracy's visit, Rob requests a visit from Johnny Connor (Richard Hawley), and reveals that he is Carla's biological father, as his mother shared the secret with him years ago.

In April 2017, during the investigation over who pushed Ken Barlow (William Roache) down the stairs, Tracy goes to the old gym, where she meets a figure with a hood over its head, she shouts out at the figure and then the figure steps forward and takes down the hood to reveal Rob. Rob tells her that he has escaped from prison because he ratted on a gang in prison and when he was being transferred to another prison, the van crashed into a river and the police think he is dead. Until Robert is once again finally apprehended and transferred to a different prison.

Off-screen, Rob discovers that he has a son named Bobby Crawford (Jack Carroll) who was conceived prior to Rob's previous imprisonment for armed robbery. Rob sent Bobby in the direction of Coronation Street to meet Carla.

When Carla begins suffering with kidney failure in January 2025, Bobby goes to visit his father in prison. Rob isn't happy, due to Bobby disowning him previously when finding out about him killing Tina, and feels he has only visited because he wants something. Rob later apparently has a change of heart and rings Bobby up agreeing to be a donor for Carla.

== Reception ==
Baylis was nominated for Best Newcomer at the Inside Soap Awards. He also received nominations for "Sexiest Male" at the 2013 and 2014 British Soap Awards. He was longlisted for "Best Actor" and "Best Bad Boy" at the 2014 Inside Soap Awards.

The character's 2017 reintroduction was praised by Laura-Jayne Tyler, writing for Inside Soap, who wrote, "The highlight of Rob's return was what is perhaps the greatest comeback line of all time: 'I suppose a bunk-up is out of the question?'"

== See also ==
- List of soap opera villains
