= Mark Redman (disambiguation) =

Mark Redman (born 1974) is an American baseball player.

Mark Redman may also refer to:

- Mark Redman (American football) (born 2002), an American football player
- Mark Redman, a character on the soap opera Coronation Street
