= Ken and Deirdre's Bedtime Stories =

- Opening titles.
- Genre: Soap opera, Comedy
- Created by: Phil Collinson
- Written by: Jonathan Harvey
- Starring: William Roache; Anne Kirkbride
- Opening theme: Eric Spear
- Country of origin: United Kingdom
- No. of seasons: 1
- No. of episodes: 10

Production
- Executive producer: Phil Collinson
- Camera setup: Multiple-camera setup
- Running time: 3 minutes
- Production company: ITV Studios

Original release
- Network: ITV Player
- Release: 14 February – 18 April 2011

Ken and Deirdre's Bedtime Stories is an online spin off from the ITV soap opera Coronation Street. The episodes were announced in January 2011, being made available on the Coronation Street website from the 14th of February. The series featured the characters Ken Barlow and his wife Deirdre Barlow talking in bed before going to sleep.

== Production ==
In January 2011, Coronation Street producers confirmed that Ken and Deirdre Barlow would take centre stage in a series of special webisodes. The online-only content would explore the discussions and banter which takes place in the couple's bedroom before the lights go out each night. The show's official website confirmed that ten webisodes have been commissioned and each would run for three minutes.

Revealing details of what is in store, a statement said: "With spilt tea on the sheets, flickering street lights from the cobbles and snoring habits high on the agenda, the night-time natter provides one last chance before the day ends for the bickering Barlows to discuss their differing approaches to life and living." The series started airing on the show's website on 14 February and ran for ten weeks thereafter. News of the internet spinoff followed the success of exclusive online-only content which was introduced for Coronation Street's 50th anniversary the month before.

== Episodes ==
The series is made up of ten three-minute episodes.

No.	Title	Written by	Original release date
1	"The one after the wedding blessing"	Jonathan Harvey	14 February 2011
Ken and Deirdre relax after the drama at Leanne & Peter's wedding.
2	"The one with the sticky drawer"	Jonathan Harvey	21 February 2011
Ken and Deirdre are both in the mood for talking but a sticky drawer gets in the way.
3	"The one where Ken wears a bra"	Jonathan Harvey	28 February 2011
Ken ends up wearing a bra when Deirdre gets sick of his loud snoring.
4	"The one with the Street lamp"	Jonathan Harvey	7 March 2011
Ken and Deirdre reminisce about childhood memories while a street light keeps them awake.
5	"The one where Ken's had a lot to drink"	Jonathan Harvey	14 March 2011
Ken's had a lot to drink and asks Deirdre to swap sides of the bed so he's closer to the bathroom.
6	"The one with the damp bed"	Jonathan Harvey	21 March 2011
Deirdre's side of the bed is wet because Ken left a damp towel there and she won't let the matter go.
7	"The one with the coffee creams"	Jonathan Harvey	28 March 2011
Ken and Deirdre enjoy a nice film with a box of chocolates.
8	"The one with the spanner and an egg"	Jonathan Harvey	4 April 2011
Deirdre can't remember how she ended up with a spanner and an egg.
9	"The one with something in the loft"	Jonathan Harvey	11 April 2011
Deirdre can't sleep when she worries there's someone in the loft.
10	"The one where Ken forgets to put the bins out"	Jonathan Harvey	18 April 2011
After weeks of asking Ken if he's put the bins out Deirdre asks him again this week and Ken hasn't.
