= Corrie! =

Comedy stage play written by Coronation Street scriptwriter Jonathan Harvey

- Official show logo
- Written by: Jonathan Harvey
- Characters: 3 male, 3 female
- Subject: British TV soap opera Coronation Street
- Genre: Comedy drama
- Setting: "The Street"

Premiere
- Date premiered: 12 August 2010
- Place premiered: United Kingdom

Corrie! is a comedy stage play written in 2010 by award-winning playwright and Coronation Street scriptwriter Jonathan Harvey. The play premiered at The Lowry in Salford Quays in August 2010. Written as part of the 50th anniversary celebrations of ITV's long-running soap opera Coronation Street, the play was scheduled to tour the UK in 2011. Guest star narrators include actors from the original TV series such as Roy Barraclough, Ken Morley and Gaynor Faye.

The production was presented by ITV Studios and Phil McIntyre Entertainments.

In 2013, the play toured New Zealand, with shows in Auckland, Christchurch, and the capital city, Wellington.
