= James Roache =

English former actor (born 1985)

- Born: William James Roache; 29 December 1985 (age 40); United Kingdom
- Education: Oxford Brookes University
- Occupation: Actor
- Years active: 2005–2011
- Father: William Roache
- Relatives: Linus Roache (half-brother); Rosalind Bennett (half-sister-in-law)

William James Roache (born 29 December 1985) is an English former actor who is perhaps best known for his roles in connection with his father William Roache. In Coronation Street, he played James, the long-lost grandson of Ken Barlow (played by his father). He also played the role of his own father William as a young man in the drama The Road to Coronation Street.

== Personal life ==
Roache was educated at Oxford Brookes University. He is the son of William Roache and the late Sara Roache and the half-brother of actor Linus Roache.

== Career ==
Roache has appeared on popular television shows such as Cold Blood and Four Seasons before going on to join the cast of Coronation Street alongside his father and older brother as part of a storyline surrounding Ken Barlow and his long-lost son, played by his real-life son Linus. The characters were introduced as part of the soap's fiftieth anniversary. Linus Roache played Roache's father Laurence on Coronation Street which saw the pair's relationship strained by Laurence's attitudes towards James' homosexuality. The storyline was left open, and both executive producer Phil Collinson and William Roache have expressed interest in revisiting the story in the future.

He then appeared in The Road to Coronation Street, playing a younger version of his father William Roache during the time Coronation Street creator Tony Warren was attempting to bring the soap to television.

It was announced on 20 December 2010 that Roache would be joining the cast of Coronation Street full-time in 2011 reprising the role of James Cunningham. He returned on 29 April 2011 and departed in July.

== Filmography ==
Year	Title	Role	Note
2005	The Marchioness Disaster	Matthew	
2006	Sellafield	Student Presenter	voiceover
2006	The Innocence Project	Stuart	
2007	Cold Blood	Joss	
2007	Rise of the Foot Soldier	Happy Eater Waiter	
2009	Four Seasons	Lucas Conroy	
2010	The Road to Coronation Street	William Roache / Ken Barlow	
2010–2011	Coronation Street	James Cunningham	Recurring role
