= Marc Baylis =

British stage, television and film actor

- Born: 3 April 1977 (age 49); Stourport-on-Severn, Worcestershire, England
- Occupation: Actor
- Years active: 2001–present

Marc Baylis (born 3 April 1977) is a British stage, television and film actor. He trained at Mountview Academy of Theatre Arts, where he was awarded the Stage Scholarship. He is best known for his role as Rob Donovan in Coronation Street from 2012 to 2014, to which he returned for guest appearances in 2015, 2016, 2017 and later in 2025.

== Theatre ==
His stage work includes playing Courtall in the 2011 London revival of Hannah Cowley's The Belle's Stratagem at the Playhouse Theatre, Southwark, directed by Jessica Swale. Michael Billington (The Guardian) heralded it "eminently revivable"; and Libby Purves (The Times) commented "Theatrical enterprise like this makes you proud to be British".

In 2010, Baylis was in Jez Butterworth's multi-award-winning production of Jerusalem at the Apollo Theatre. The production was directed by Ian Rickson and starred Mark Rylance as Johnny "Rooster" Byron and Mackenzie Crook as Ginger.

Other theatre productions include Sonia Friedman's Prick Up Your Ears (Harold Pinter Theatre) directed by Daniel Kramer; King Arthur (Arcola Theatre) directed by John Terry and Mike Bartlett; Futures (Theatre 503); and Hamlet and The Tempest, both for Thelma Holt and the Theatre Royal, Plymouth.

== Television ==
On screen Baylis made his television debut in 2001 playing the young Albert Finney in My Uncle Silas. He has also played various roles in Channel 4's Sirens, The Bill, EastEnders, Doctors and Hollyoaks.

On 3 May 2012, it was announced Baylis had joined the cast of Coronation Street as Rob Donovan, the younger brother of Carla Connor. He made his first on-screen appearance on 9 July 2012. It was announced in June 2014 that Baylis would be leaving the role of Rob in Coronation Street. The character was written out on 5 November 2014; due to his character receiving a 25-year prison sentence for the murder of Tina McIntyre. In August 2015, it was revealed that Baylis was to reprise his role as Rob later in the year, despite the fact his character was still in prison. He departed for a second time in January 2016, and made a surprise return to Coronation Street in April 2017; having escaped from prison.

== Other appearances ==
Baylis appears in the music video for the song "Propane Nightmares" by Australian drum and bass group, Pendulum, released in 2008. He has also starred in short films most notably My Dad Marie.

== Filmography ==
=== Film ===
Year	Title	Role	Notes
2008	A New Dawn	Michael	Short film
2008	Changing Faces	Dale	
2008	End of the Tour	Robert	Short film
2008	Diva	Michael	Short film
2011	Release	Kelvin	Short film
2011	Wounded	Wacker	
2012	Strippers vs Werewolves	Carlos	
2016	Arcadia	Charlie	
2018	Redcon-1	Rowan	
2019	Off Grid	The Stranger	Short film
2020	My Dad Marie	Marie	Short film

=== Television ===
Year	Title	Role	Notes
2001	My Uncle Silas	Young Silas	Episode: "Silas & Goliath/The Revelation"
2005	Doctors	Ed Allen	Episode: "For Better, for Worse"
2006	When Evil Calls	Al	Miniseries, 2 episodes
2009	EastEnders	Carouser	Episode: "New Year's Day 2009"
2010	The Bill	Mike Stratton	Episode: "The Truth Will Out"
2011	Sirens	Dave	Episode: "Two Man Race"
2011	Misfits	PC Mitchell	Episode: "Series 3, Episode 1"
2011	Law & Order: UK	Stevie	Episode: "Dawn Till Dusk"
2012-2017, 2025	Coronation Street	Rob Donovan	Series regular, 316 episodes
2019	London Kills	Andrew Charr	Episode: "Family Affairs"

== Awards and nominations ==
Year	Award	Category	Result	Ref.
2013	The British Soap Awards	Sexiest Male	Nominated	
2013	The British Soap Awards	Best Newcomer	Nominated	
2013	TV Choice Awards	Best Soap Newcomer	Shortlisted	
2013	Inside Soap Awards	Best Newcomer	Shortlisted	
2014	19th National Television Awards	Best Newcomer	Nominated	
2014	The British Soap Awards	Sexiest Male	Nominated	
2014	Inside Soap Awards	Best Actor	Nominated	
2014	Inside Soap Awards	Sexiest Male	Nominated	
2014	Inside Soap Awards	Best Bad Boy	Won	
2015	20th National Television Awards	Serial Drama Performance	Nominated	
