= William Roache =

English actor (born 1932)

William Roache OBE
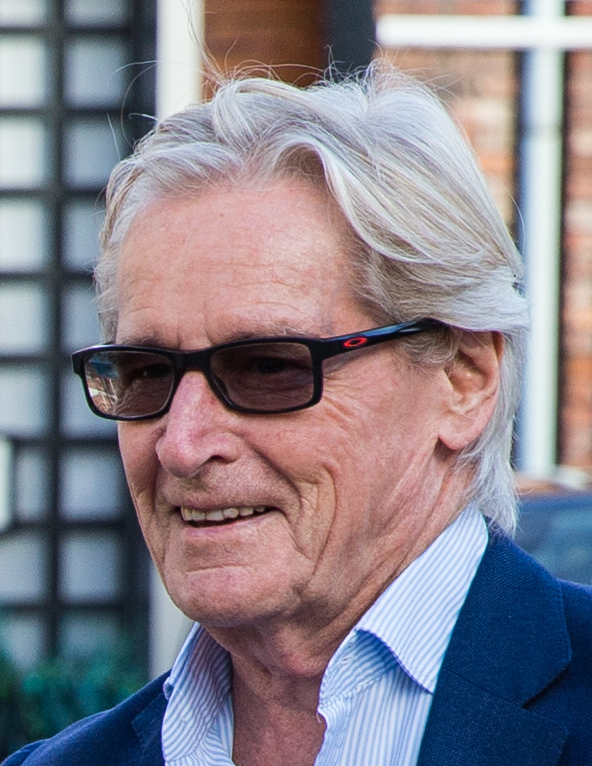
- Roache in 2021
- Born: 25 April 1932 (age 94); Basford, Nottinghamshire, England
- Occupation: Actor
- Years active: 1958–present
- Known for: Coronation Street (1960–present); Ken and Deirdre's Bedtime Stories (2011)
- Spouses: Anna Cropper (m. 1961; div. 1974); Sara McEwan Mottram (m. 1978; died 2009)
- Partner: Emma Jesson (2010–2012)
- Children: 5, including Linus and James
- Relatives: Rosalind Bennett (daughter-in-law)

William Patrick Roache (born 25 April 1932) is an English actor. He is best known for playing Ken Barlow in the ITV soap opera Coronation Street and is the longest-serving cast member in the series as well as a world record holder, having appeared in the show continuously since its first broadcast on 9 December 1960. He is listed in the Guinness World Records as the longest-serving television star in a continuous role.

== Early life ==
William Patrick Roache was born in the Basford suburb of Nottingham on 25 April 1932 the son of Hester Vera (née Waddicor) and Joseph William Vincent Roache, a doctor. His mother was the daughter of Albert and Mary Zillah Waddicor, a successful businesswoman, who ran a restaurant and tea rooms at Alton Towers, which had been opened as a tourist attraction – but not at that time a theme park – after the death of the 20th Earl of Shrewsbury; Albert was a violent drunk.

Roache grew up in Ilkeston, Derbyshire, where he attended a Steiner school set up by his grandfather, a physician and surgeon, in the family's garden. His grandfather was a Freemason who was interested in such things as theosophy, esotericism, hypnotism, spiritualism, and homoeopathy, as well as the teachings of philosopher and educationalist Rudolf Steiner. Roache was later educated at Rydal School. He joined the British Army and was commissioned into the Royal Welch Fusiliers in 1953. A year later, he was promoted to the rank of lieutenant. He left in 1956 with the rank of captain. Due to an exploding mortar round during his military service, he suffered from tinnitus.

== Career ==
After leaving the military, Roache turned to acting. He appeared in various stage productions, then had uncredited roles in several films, and later won small parts in television serials including Knight Errant Limited and Skyport. He played the minor role of a space centre operator in the Norman Wisdom film The Bulldog Breed. Shortly before joining Coronation Street at the beginning of the programme in 1960, Roache played the leading role in a Granada Television play called Marking Time, transmitted on ITV in 1961. In an interview with the Liverpool Post in 2007, Roache recalled "I played a young soldier in Germany who fraternised with a German girl, although I can't remember now how it ended. It was highly prestigious, though, and I have tried to hunt it down but there is no trace of it." He added: "But Tony Warren, who created Coronation Street, saw it and thought I was right for Ken Barlow."

On 16 October 1985, just weeks before the 25th anniversary of his debut on Coronation Street, Roache appeared as the subject of TV show This Is Your Life. Ken and Me, Roache's first autobiography, was published in 1993, covering his life on and off screen. In 1999, Roache was the recipient of the British Soap Awards Lifetime Achievement Award for his role as Ken Barlow. In 2003, Roache appeared on Celebrity Stars in Their Eyes as Perry Como singing the song "Catch a Falling Star". In September and October 2005, he appeared as a celebrity contestant in Ant & Dec's Gameshow Marathon. He was the winner of The Golden Shot (a remake), progressing through to Bullseye in which he was beaten by television presenter Vernon Kay. He later entered All Star Family Fortunes, hosted by Kay, but lost by two points to his competitors.

Roache's 2008 autobiography Soul on the Street contains a substantial amount of philosophical content in which Roache affirms his belief in the afterlife. In October 2008, he revealed on BBC Breakfast he had had a two-year feud with actress Pat Phoenix, a fellow Coronation Street cast member, during which they did not speak to each other: this stemmed from her changing a scene involving the two of them. However, they did reconcile and became good friends. In 2010, 50 Years on the Street: My Life with Ken Barlow, a memoir focusing on Roache's work on Coronation Street, was published to coincide with his 50th year playing Barlow.

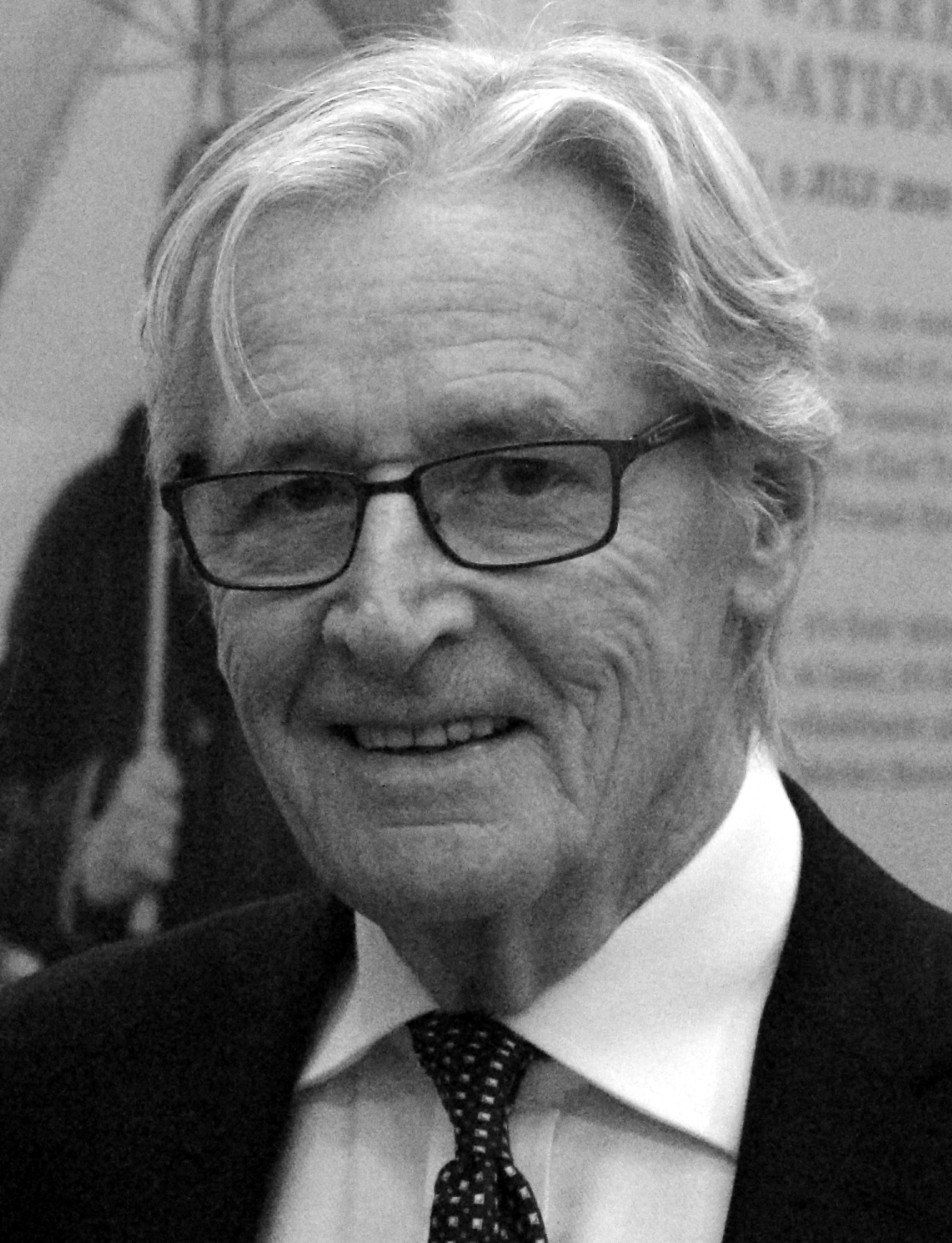
Roache attending Four Miles from Manchester; Tony Warren's Coronation Street exhibition at Salford Museum & Art Gallery in October 2017

On 13 April 2012, Piers Morgan interviewed Roache for his ITV series Piers Morgan's Life Stories. During this show Roache said he had had sex with around 1,000 women. On 26 September 2012, Roache was featured in the BBC series Who Do You Think You Are?, researching his family history. He is currently Coronation Street's longest-serving actor, having been in the cast from the first episode. In 2018, the book Life and Soul: How to Live a Long and Healthy Life was released, in which Roache shares his personal philosophy and life experiences.

As of March 2018, Roache was the world's longest-serving television actor in a continuous role following the 2010 cancellation of the American soap opera As the World Turns, in which Don Hastings had played Bob Hughes since October 1960 without a break.

Roache's biography, The Times and Life of William 'Bill' Roache: Actor for the Ages, was released to coincide with his 90th birthday on 15 April 2022.

== Personal life ==
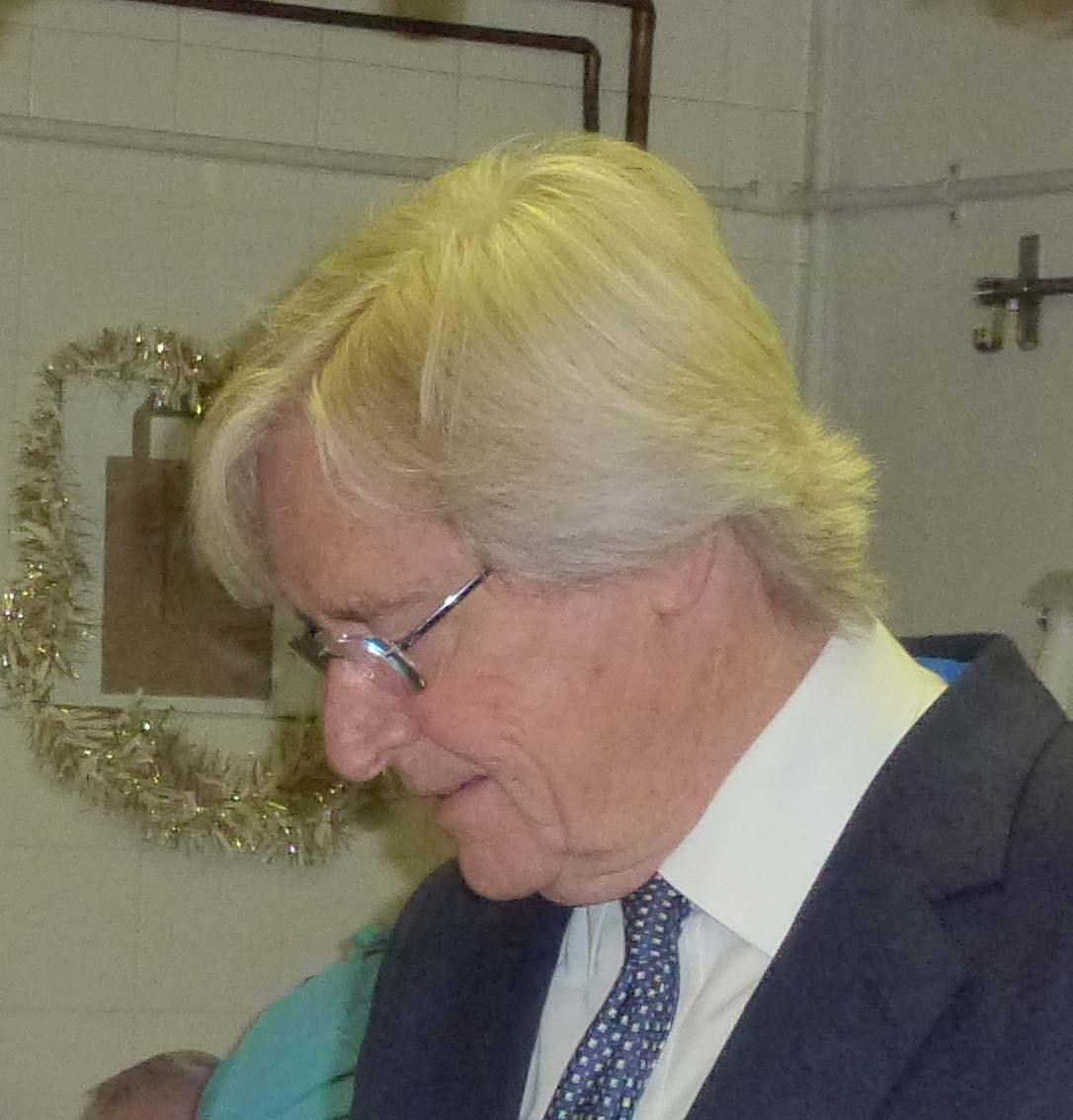
Roache opening a Caketastic store in Wythenshawe in December 2012

Roache lives in Wilmslow, Cheshire. His eldest son, with his first wife Anna Cropper, is actor Linus Roache (born 1964). The couple also had a daughter, Vanya (1967–2018). Roache and Cropper were married from 1961 until divorcing in 1974. Roache married his second wife, Sara McEwan Mottram, in 1978. She died suddenly on 7 February 2009 at their home, aged 58. With McEwan Mottram, he had a daughter (born 1981) and a younger son, actor James Roache (christened William; born 1985). A second daughter died aged 18 months, on 16 November 1984.

In 1991, Roache won a libel action against The Sun, which had described him as boring and unpopular with his fellow Coronation Street stars. He was awarded £50,000 in damages by the jury, the same amount that he had turned down in an out-of-court settlement offered by the newspaper before the case. As a result, he was liable for the £120,000 costs incurred. Roache sued his law firm for negligence in 1998, and was declared bankrupt in April 1999.

Roache is a supporter of the Conservative Party, in stark contrast to his character Ken Barlow, who has been stereotyped as a Labour Party supporter. In 2007, as a guest for Daily Politics, he championed John Major as Britain's greatest post-war prime minister. He backed Conservative MP Neil Hamilton in the 1997 election against Martin Bell. Roache opposed instant-runoff voting in favour of first-past-the-post voting during the 2011 referendum on the issue.

Roache became patron of the Ilkeston-based production company Sustained Magic Ltd in 2006.

Roache dated weather reporter Emma Jesson from 2010 to 2012.

Roache wrote about his interest in astrology in his biography, which he learned by taking a correspondence course from the Faculty of Astrological Studies. He said he had impressed members of the Coronation Street cast by the accuracy with which he read their astrological charts for them.

== Legal issues ==
On 1 May 2013, Roache was arrested by Lancashire Police on suspicion of having raped a 15-year-old girl in 1967, an allegation he denied. The Crown Prosecution Service subsequently announced that he was to be charged with two counts of rape. There was a preliminary hearing in a Magistrates' court on 14 May 2013 and a Crown Court hearing took place on 10 June 2013. On 6 June 2013, Roache was charged with a further five counts of indecent assault against girls aged between 12 and 16. Roache appeared at Preston Crown Court on 2 September and pleaded not guilty to all charges. The full trial started on 14 January 2014 at Preston Crown Court, before Judge Anthony Russell QC. During the trial, one charge was dismissed by the judge citing a lack of evidence. Some details in two witnesses' accounts changed in the course of the trial.

On 6 February 2014, Roache was found not guilty on all charges. Following his acquittal, Roache gave a brief statement saying that there had been "no winners" and expressing his intent to "get back to work". A waxwork of Ken Barlow had been removed from the Madame Tussauds waxwork exhibition in Blackpool due to fears it might be vandalised. The waxwork was returned to the exhibition in February 2014 following Roache's acquittal. Roache resumed filming on Coronation Street in June 2014, and returned to the screen on 4 August of that year.

== Awards ==
In 1999, Roache was awarded the British Soap Awards Lifetime Achievement Award for his role as Ken Barlow.

In March 2007, Roache was awarded the Honorary degree of Doctor of Letters by the University of Chester in recognition of his contribution to television.

Roache was appointed Member of the Order of the British Empire (MBE) in the 2001 New Year Honours and Officer of the Order of the British Empire (OBE) in the 2022 New Year Honours for services to drama and charity.

== Filmography ==
Year	Show	Role	Note
1958	Behind the Mask	Young Doctor	Uncredited
1960–present	Coronation Street	Ken Barlow	4,935 episodes
1960	The Bulldog Breed	Space Centre operator	Uncredited
1960	Knight Errant Limited	Various	2 episodes
1961	The Queen's Guards	Field Radio Operator	Uncredited
1969	All Star Comedy Carnival	Ken Barlow	
1999	Comic Relief Special - Wetty Hainthropp Investigates	Ken Barlow	
2005	Comic Relief	Ken Barlow	
2011	Ken and Deirdre's Bedtime Stories	Ken Barlow	Coronation Street spin-off series; 10 episodes
2017	The Missing Crown Jewels	Himself	Part of Ant & Dec's Saturday Night Takeaway

== See also ==
- Michael Le Vell, a fellow Coronation Street actor who was acquitted of sexual offences in a separate case
