= Barlow (surname) =

Barlow is an English surname.

== Origins and variants ==
One theory suggests that the surname is related to the place of the same name in Derbyshire and mean "[lives on] the bare hill". At the time of the British census of 1881, the frequency of the surname Barlow was highest in Cheshire (4.4 times the British average), followed by Lancashire, Nottinghamshire, Staffordshire, Buckinghamshire, Derbyshire, Berkshire, Rutland and Warwickshire.

== People with the surname ==
- Ambrose Barlow (1585–1641), English Roman Catholic martyr
- André Barlow (born 1953), South African minister from the Dutch Reformed Church
- Andrew Barlow (1899–1961), Australian cricket umpire
- Andrew Henry Barlow (1837–1915), politician in Queensland, Australia
- Andy Barlow (footballer) (born 1965), English football player
- Andy Barlow (producer), English musical producer, member of band Lamb
- Barriemore Barlow (born 1949), English drummer, former member of Jethro Tull
- Ben Barlow (born 1994), Welsh vocalist with pop punk band Neck Deep
- Bill Barlow (1931–2020), Canadian politician
- Billy Barlow (1871–1963), Canadian ice hockey player
- Bryan Alwyn Barlow (born 1933), Australian botanist, former director of the Australian National
- Calvin S. Barlow (1856–1920), Washington state pioneer, businessman, and politician
- Celia Barlow (born 1955), British Labour Party politician
- Charles Sydney Barlow (1905–1979), South African conservationist, for whom Barlow's lark is named
- Chloe Barlow, author
- Clarence Barlow (1945–2023), composer of classical and electroacoustic works
- Colby Barlow (born 2005), Canadian ice hockey player
- Colin Barlow (1935–2018), English football player
- David Barlow (disambiguation), multiple people
- Denise P. Barlow (1950–2017), British geneticist
- Dick Barlow (1851–1919), Lancashire and England cricketer
- Eddie Barlow (1940–2005), South African cricketer
- Eeben Barlow, founder of Executive Outcomes
- Elmer E. Barlow (1887–1948), American jurist
- Emilie-Claire Barlow (born 1976), Canadian jazz singer, voice actress
- Erasmus Darwin Barlow (1915–2005), British psychiatrist
- Francis Barlow (artist) (est. 1626–1704), British painter, etcher, and illustrator
- Francis C. Barlow (1834–1896), US lawyer, politician, and general
- Frank Barlow (disambiguation), several people
- Ferdinand Barlow (1881–1951), French classical composer
- Gary Barlow (born 1971), English singer-songwriter, best known for being a member of the boy band Take That
- George Barlow (disambiguation), several people
- Sir George Barlow, 1st Baronet (1763–1846), Acting Governor-General of India from 1805 to 1807
- George Hilaro Barlow (physician) (1806–1866), Royal College of Physicians, first editor of Guy's Hospital Reports
- Graham Barlow (born 1950), English Test and county cricketer (Middlesex CCC)
- Haven J. Barlow (1922–2022), American politician
- Henry Clark Barlow (1806–1876), English writer on Dante
- Horace Barlow (1921–2020), Cambridge physiologist, neuroscientist, vision scientist
- Howard Barlow (cryptographer) (1918–2003) American cryptographer and telecommunications expert
- Iman Barlow (born 1993), English martial artist
- Jack Barlow (1924–2011), American country music singer-songwriter
- James A. Barlow (1923–2015), American geologist and politician
- James Barlow Hoy (1794–1843), Irish-born politician
- Joe Barlow (born 1995), American baseball player
- Joel Barlow (1754–1812), American poet and diplomat
- John Barlow (disambiguation), several people
- John Barlow (1815–1856), veterinary scientist at the University of Edinburgh
- John Henry Barlow (1855–1924), British Quaker statesman, pacifist and co-founder of the Friends Ambulance Unit
- Ken Barlow (basketball) (born 1964), American former professional basketball player
- Kevan Barlow (born 1979), NFL running back
- Kim Barlow (born 1969), a Canadian folk singer
- Leonard Monteagle Barlow (1898–1918), British World War I flying ace
- Lillian Barlow (1876–1942), American Shaker eldress, woodworker
- Lou Barlow (born 1966), musician, member of the bands Dinosaur Jr and Sebadoh
- Marcus Barlow (1890–1955), Australian architect
- Martin T. Barlow (born 1953), British mathematician
- Matt Barlow (born 1970), vocalist of the heavy metal band Iced Earth
- Maude Barlow (born 1947), Canadian author and activist
- Michael Barlow (born 1987), Australian rules footballer
- Micah Barlow (1873–1936), English cricketer
- Mike Barlow (born 1948), American Major League Baseball player
- Milt G. Barlow (1843–1904), American vaudeville and minstrel player
- Patrick Barlow (born 1947), British actor and dramatist
- Peter Barlow (disambiguation), several people
- Phyllida Barlow (1944–2023), British sculptor and art academic
- Randy Barlow (1943–2020), American country music singer
- Reginald Barlow (1866–1943) American soldier and stage and screen actor
- Richard E. Barlow (1931–2024), American mathematician and mathematical statistician
- Richard Barlow (cricketer) (born 1972), English cricketer
- Richard Barlow (intelligence analyst), CIA whistleblower
- Robert Barlow (disambiguation), several people
- Sam Barlow (disambiguation), several people
- Scott Barlow (disambiguation), several people
- Stephen Barlow (disambiguation), several people
- Thelma Barlow (born 1929), British actress
- Thomas Barlow (disambiguation), several people
- Tim Barlow (1936–2023), English actor
- Walter Jarvis Barlow (1868–1937), founded Barlow Sanatorium in 1902, now Barlow Respiratory Hospital, in Los Angeles
- William Barlow (disambiguation), several people

== Fictional characters ==
- Charles Barlow, a police inspector in the British crime dramas Z-Cars, Softly, Softly, Barlow at Large and Second Verdict
- Kurt Barlow, character in Stephen King's novel Salem's Lot
- Nora Barlow, a character in the book series Leviathan
- Kate Barlow, a character in the movie Holes
- Elder Joseph Barlow, a character in August Wilson's play Radio Golf
- Barlow (no first name), Sherlock Holmes's dentist in "How Watson Learned the Trick", by Arthur Conan Doyle
- Maxine Barlow, character in Waterloo Road

=== Coronation Street ===
The British soap opera Coronation Street has featured the Barlow family since its inception in 1960, and had therefore featured numerous characters with the surname, who are listed alphabetically below.

- Adam Barlow
- Amy Barlow
- Carla Barlow
- David Barlow
- Deirdre Barlow
- Frank Barlow
- Ida Barlow
- Irma Barlow
- Janet Barlow
- Jessica Barlow
- Ken Barlow
- Leanne Barlow
- Lucy Barlow
- Peter Barlow
- Sarah Barlow
- Shelley Barlow
- Simon Barlow
- Susan Barlow
- Tracy Barlow
- Valerie Barlow

== See also ==
- Barlowe
- Bartow (name)
