= James Barlow =

James Barlow may refer to:

- James Barlow (author) (1921–1973), British novelist
- James A. Barlow (1923–2015), American geologist and politician
- James E. Barlow (1881–1958), American civil engineer and city manager
