= 1960 NSWSF season =

NSW Federation of Soccer Clubs
- Season: 1960
- Champions: Sydney Prague
- Premiers: Canterbury-Marrickville
- Matches: 186
- Top goalscorer: Herbert Ninaus (46 goals)
- Biggest home win: Prague 10–1 Manly
- Biggest away win: Auburn 1–8 Manly
- Highest scoring: Manly 6–9 Prague

The 1960 New South Wales Federation of Soccer Clubs (NSWSF) season was the fourth season of football in New South Wales under the administration of the federation since its breakaway from the NSW Soccer Football Association in January of 1957. The home and away league season began on the 20th of March with fourteen teams, the same amount as the previous season. Sydney Prague were minor premiers for a second consecutive season after twenty-six rounds of competition.

Once again a finals series was used decide the First Division champions of New South Wales in the format of a four team page playoff system. Canterbury-Marrickville prevented Prague again winning the league double, defeating them 5–2 in the grand final.

Other tournaments held this season included the Ampol Cup and the third edition of the Federation Cup. Budapest won the Ampol Cup defeating APIA Leichhardt in the final and Bankstown defeated Canterbury in the Ascot Thousand Federation Cup final.

== Clubs ==
Changes from last season

- Manly Warringah was promoted into the competition from Second Division
- Concord was relegated to Second Division and was absorbed by Concordia.
- North Side United merged with Illawarra District Soccer Association club, E.P.T. to form North Side United–E.P.T.

Club	Ground	Colours	Founded	App	Debut	Last season
A.P.I.A.	Lambert Park, Leichhardt	Maroon and blue	1954	4th	1957	2nd (runners-up)
Auburn SFC	Mona Park, Auburn	Green and gold	1957	4th	1957	6th
Balgownie Rangers	Judy Masters Oval, Balgownie	Black and white	1889	2nd	1959	13th
Bankstown SFC	Bankstown Oval, Bankstown	Green and gold	1944	4th	1957	12th
Budapest	Sydney Athletics Field, Moore Park	Red, white and green	1957	2nd	1959	11th
Canterbury-Marrickville	Arlington Oval, Dulwich Hill	Blue and gold	1896 (Note: As Canterbury Bankstown in 1943. As Canterbury-Marrickville in 1951.)	4th	1957	5th
Corrimal United	Memorial Park, Corrimal	Red and white	1958	3rd	1958	3rd (minor semi-finalist)
Gladesville-Ryde	Gladesville Sports Ground, Gladesville	Amber and black	1951	4th	1957	8th
Granville AEK	Macarthur Park, Granville	Amber and black	1885	2nd	1959	10th
Hakoah	Sydney Athletics Field, Moore Park	Sky Blue and White	1953	4th	1957	4th (preliminary finalists)
North Side United–E.P.T.	Chatswood Oval, Chatswood	Blue and gold	1953	4th	1957	7th
Prague	Sydney Athletics Field, Moore Park	Sky Blue	1952	4th	1957	1st (winners)
Sydney Austral	Sydney Cricket Ground No. 2, Moore Park	Red, white and blue	1952	4th	1957	9th

== Regular season ==
=== Table and results ===
Pos	Team	Pld	W	D	L	GF	GA	GD	Pts	Qualification or relegation
1	Prague	26	21	4	1	106	34	+72	46	1960 Federation Finals
2	APIA	26	18	5	3	71	25	+46	41	1960 Federation Finals
3	Canterbury-Marrickville (C)	26	18	2	6	79	48	+31	38	1960 Federation Finals
4	Auburn	26	17	2	7	81	55	+26	36	1960 Federation Finals
5	Gladesville-Ryde	26	16	3	7	62	43	+19	35	
6	Budapest	26	13	3	10	70	62	+8	29	
7	North Side United-E.P.T.	26	10	5	11	67	59	+8	25	
8	Bankstown	26	10	4	12	50	51	−1	24	
9	Hakoah	26	10	3	13	62	59	+3	23	
10	Sydney Austral	26	7	5	14	43	69	−26	19	
11	Corrimal United	26	7	4	15	56	62	−6	18	
12	Granville AEK (R)	26	6	3	17	45	80	−35	15	Relegation to NSWSF Second Division for next season.
13	Balgownie Rangers (R)	26	6	1	19	40	77	−37	13	Relegation to NSWSF Second Division for next season.
14	Manly Warringah (R)	26	1	0	25	41	149	−108	2	Relegation to NSWSF Second Division for next season.

Source: www.rsssf.org
Rules for classification: 1) points; 2) goal difference; 3) number of goals scored.
(C) Champions; (R) Relegated

=== Results ===
Home \ Away	API	AUB	BAL	BAN	BUD	CAN	COR	GLR	GRN	HAK	MAN	NSU	PRA	SAU
APIA		2–3	6–0	3–1	2–1	0–1	3–2	0–2	3–0	3–2	7–0	3–0	1–0	4–0
Auburn	1–2		4–3	0–2	9–2	4–0	2–0	1–4	4–2	1–2	2–0	4–3	2–3	3–3
Balgownie Rangers	0–4	2–3		1–3	2–5	1–5	3–2	1–3	2–1	2–5	3–1	2–3	1–4	1–0
Bankstown	1–1	0–4	4–0		3–5	0–4	2–5	1–3	2–1	2–2	6–1	0–0	0–1	3–3
Budapest	3–3	3–2	1–1	0–3		3–5	3–0	4–2	5–1	2–1	7–1	3–0	1–3	3–3
Canterbury-Marrickville	0–3	6–8	5–3	2–0	2–1		3–2	3–2	1–0	3–1	6–0	0–0	1–1	2–0
Corrimal United	0–3	1–3	2–3	2–0	3–4	3–1		2–3	0–1	3–1	6–2	4–5	1–4	4–1
Gladesville Ryde	1–2	2–3	4–1	1–0	2–1	3–2	1–1		4–2	1–0	4–2	1–3	0–2	3–1
Granville AEK	2–2	1–4	2–1	0–1	3–2	0–2	3–4	3–0		2–5	7–4	1–6	2–6	0–1
Hakoah	0–2	1–1	1–2	3–1	2–3	4–6	3–1	2–2	5–0		4–0	5–4	2–5	0–1
Manly Warringah	1–7	1–8	0–3	2–6	1–4	3–6	2–1	2–8	3–4	2–6		2–4	6–9	2–4
North Side United	2–3	1–2	3–1	1–5	4–1	0–5	5–5	1–2	3–3	3–1	8–0		3–3	2–0
Prague	1–1	8–0	4–0	4–1	4–0	5–3	3–1	2–2	7–1	4–0	10–1	3–2		7–0
Sydney Austral	0–3	1–3	2–1	2–5	0–3	1–5	0–0	1–2	3–3	3–4	9–2	2–1	2–3	

Legend: Blue = home team win; Yellow = draw; Red = away team win.

== Finals series ==
Semi-finals
Major semi-final
1	Prague	1
3	APIA Leichhardt	0
Minor semi-final
3	Canterbury	2
4	Auburn	0

Final
2	APIA Leichhardt	2
3	Canterbury	3

Grand Final
1	Prague	2
3	APIA Leichhardt	5

=== Semi-finals ===
17 September 1960 Minor semi-final	Canterbury-Marrickville	2–0	Auburn	ES Marks Athletics Field, Moore Park
	Baumgartner 23'; Smith 43'	Report		Attendance: 5,100; Referee: Roy Pearce

18 September 1960 Major semi-final	Prague	3–0	APIA Leichhardt	Sydney Sports Ground, Moore Park
	Ninaus 39', 72'; Jaros 79'	Report		Attendance: 13,189; Referee: John Ipenburg

=== Preliminary final ===
25 September 1960	APIA Leichhardt	2–3 (a.e.t.)	Canterbury-Marrickville	Wentworth Park, Glebe
	Schio 18', 77'	Report	J. Warren 30', 31'; Smith 93'	Attendance: 10,800; Referee: Roy Pearce

=== Grand final ===
An Australian record crowd of 17,872 delivered £4,216 in gate takings. They saw the only second defeat of Prague throughout the season. Prague could not field Walter Tamandl, one of their Austrian stars, due to injury. The final was also broadcast on television by the ABC, albeit with a week delay. The trophy for the winner was name sponsored by Bisleri.

2 October 1960
Grand Final

Prague	2–5	Canterbury-Marrickville
Jaros 52'; Sherwin 83'	Report	Amigo 14'; Smith 26'; Baumgartner 63'; G. Warren 68'; Salisbury 78'

Henson Park, Marrickville
Attendance: 17,872
Referee: John Ipenburg

GK	1	(Australia) Ron Lord
RB	2	(Australia) Ken Hiron (capt.)
LB	3	(Australia) Kevin O'Neill
RH	4	(Australia) Stuart Sherwin
CH	5	(Austria) Erwin Ninaus
LH	6	(Germany) Les Scheinflug
OR	7	(Austria) Erich Schwarz
IR	8	(Hungary) Andreas Saghi
CF	9	(Austria) Herbert Ninaus
IL	10	(Austria) Karl Jaros
OL	11	(Australia) Fred Durenberger
Coach:
(Australia)

GK	1	(Australia) Ron Brown
RB	2	(Australia) John Curry
LB	3	(Australia) Ed Jones
RH	4	(Australia) Johnny Watkiss
CH	5	(Australia) Tom North
LH	6	(Australia) Geoff Campbell
OR	7	(Spain) José "Joe" Amigo
IR	8	(Australia) Brian Smith
CF	9	(Austria) Leo Baumgartner
IL	10	(Australia) Barry Salisbury
OL	11	(Australia) Geoff Warren
Coach: (Hungary) József "Joe" Vlasits

NSWSF First Division
1960 Premiers

Canterbury-Marrickville
Second Title

== Awards and statistics ==
=== Top goal-scorers ===
Rank	Player	Club	Goals
1	Herbert Ninaus	Prague	46
2	Bruce Morrow	Auburn	37
3	Leo Baumgartner	Canterbury	30
4	Bill Hume	Gladesville-Ryde	29
5	Tony Varglien	North Side United–E.P.T.	27

=== Attendance ===
Below is a list of total attendances per club in all matches, both home and away.

Club	Attendance
APIA Leichhardt FC	113,000
Sydney FC Prague	96,000
Canterbury-Marrickville	72,000
Sydney Hakoah	61,000
Auburn SFC	60,000
Budapest	58,000
Gladesville-Ryde DSFC	50,000
Corrimal United	34,000
Granville AEK	31,000
Bankstown SFC	30,000
North Side United–E.P.T.	26,000
Sydney Austral SFC	26,000
Balgownie Rangers FC	24,000
Manly Warringah	18,000

== Other competitions ==
=== Ampol Cup ===
Originally formed in 1957 as the William Kennard Cup, this was the third year to be sponsored by Ampol.

Final

11 March 1960
Final

Budapest	5–2	APIA Leichhardt
	Report

=== Ascot Thousand Federation Cup ===
This was the fourth year contesting the Federation Cup, named the Ascot Thousand for sponsorship reasons.

Final

23 October 1960
Final

Bankstown	1–0	Canterbury-Marrickville
	Report

Henson Park, Marrickville
Attendance: 10,500
Referee: Roy Pearce
