= George Barlow =

George Barlow may refer to:

- George Barlow (MP), Member of Parliament (MP) for Haverfordwest
- George Barlow (English poet) (1847–c. 1913), English poet, who sometimes wrote under the pseudonym James Hinton
- George H. Barlow (1921–1979), United States federal judge
- George Hilaro Barlow (physician) (1806–1866), English physician and first editor of Guy's Hospital Reports
- Sir George Barlow, 1st Baronet (1763–1846), acting Governor-General of British India 1805–07
- Sir George Barlow, 2nd Baronet (c. 1680–1726), British landowner and politician
- George Barlow (footballer, born 1885) (1885–1921), British footballer
- George Barlow (footballer, born 1914), British football player
- George Barlow (American poet) (born 1948), American poet
- George Barlow (American football) (born 1967), American football coach
- George Barlow (soccer) (1933–2021), Australian footballer
- George W. Barlow (1929–2007), American ichthyologist
