= George Hilaro Barlow =

George Hilaro Barlow may refer to:

- Sir George Barlow, 1st Baronet (1763–1846), acting Governor-General of British India 1805–07
- George Hilaro Barlow (physician) (1806–1866), English physician and first editor of Guy's Hospital Reports
