= John Barlow =

John Barlow may refer to:

== Politicians ==
- John Barlow (died 1718), MP for Haverfordwest
- John Barlow (died 1739), MP for Pembrokeshire (UK Parliament constituency)
- Sir John Barlow, 1st Baronet (1857–1932), British businessman and member of parliament
- Sir John Barlow, 2nd Baronet (1898–1986), British member of parliament 1951–1966
- John Barlow (Canadian politician) (born 1971), Canadian member of parliament from 2014 until present
- John M. Barlow (1833–1903), American businessman and politician

== Others ==
- John Barlow (diplomat), English Tudor diplomat and spy
- John Barlow (priest) (1799–1869), Anglican clergyman and scientist
- John Barlow (entomologist) (1872–1944), American entomologist and college administrator
- John Barlow, New Zealander convicted of murdering businessmen Gene and Eugene Thomas
- John Barlow (novelist) (born 1967), English novelist
- John Barlow (veterinary surgeon) (1815–1856), British professor in Edinburgh and father of John Henry Barlow
- John Brereton Barlow (1924–2008), South African cardiologist
- John Henry Barlow (1855–1924), British Quaker "ambassador for peace", son of John Barlow (veterinary scientist)
- John Noble Barlow (1861–1917), English impressionist painter
- John Peleg Barlow (1918–1985), American oceanographer
- John Perry Barlow (1947–2018), American digital rights activist and former lyricist for the Grateful Dead
- John W. Barlow (1838–1914), career officer in the United States Army
- John Y. Barlow (1874–1949), Mormon fundamentalist and polygamist
- John Barlow (footballer, born 1875), played for Everton, Reading, Tottenham and Leicester
- F. John Barlow, American businessman and mineral collector, see Barlow Planetarium
- Sir John Barlow, 1st Baronet of Slebetch (c. 1652–1695), of the Barlow baronets

== See also ==
- Jack Barlow (1924– 2011), American country music singer and songwriter
