= Barlog =

Barlog (Polish: Barłóg) is a Polish surname literally meaning "bear's lair". Notable people with the surname include:

- Boleslaw Barlog (1906–1999), German stage, film, and opera director
- Cory Barlog (born 1975), American video game designer

== See also ==
- Barlow (surname)
