= Howard Barlow =

Howard Barlow may refer to:

- Howard Barlow (cryptographer)
- Howard Barlow (musician)
