= Bartov =

Bartov is a surname. Notable people with the surname include:

- David Bartov (1924–2018), Israeli judge
- Hanoch Bartov (1926–2016), Israeli author and journalist
- Omer Bartov (born 1954), Israeli academic, son of Hanoch

== See also ==
- Bartow (name)
