= 1959 NSWSF season =

NSW Federation of Soccer Clubs
- Season: 1959
- Champions: Sydney Prague
- Premiers: Sydney Prague
- Best Player: Bobby Young (Corrimal) and Joe Vasvary (APIA)
- Top goalscorer: Leo Baumgartner (29 goals)

The 1959 New South Wales Federation of Soccer Clubs (NSWSF) season was the third season of football in New South Wales under the administration of the federation since its breakaway from the NSW Soccer Football Association in January of 1957. The home and away league season began on the 28th of March with fourteen teams, increasing its number by two clubs from the previous season. Sydney Prague were minor premiers after twenty-six rounds of competition.

Once again a finals series was used decide the First Division champions of New South Wales in the format of a four team page playoff system. Sydney Prague won the league double, becoming this season's champions with a 3–2 the grand final win over APIA Leichhardt FC.

Other tournaments held this season included the Ampol Cup and the third edition of the Federation Cup. Both competitions were won by Sydney Prague, meaning the club won all three competitions held by the federation.

== Clubs ==
Changes from last season

- Number of teams increased from twelve (12) to fourteen (14)
- Balgownie Rangers FC, Budapest and Granville AEK were all new entries into the competition
- Villawood was relegated to Second Division

Club	Ground	Colours	Founded	App	Debut	Last season
A.P.I.A.	Lambert Park, Leichhardt	Maroon and blue	1954	3rd	1957	8th
Auburn SFC	Mona Park, Auburn	Green and gold	1957	3rd	1957	3rd (runners-up)
Balgownie Rangers	Judy Masters Oval, Balgownie	Black and white	1889	1st	1959	2nd NSWSFA First Div.
Bankstown SFC	Bankstown Oval, Bankstown	Green and gold	1944	3rd	1957	7th
Budapest	Sydney Athletics Field, Moore Park	Red, white and green	1957	1st	1959	1st in Second Div.
Canterbury-Marrickville	Arlington Oval, Dulwich Hill	Blue and gold	1896 (Note: As Canterbury Bankstown in 1943. As Canterbury-Marrickville in 1951.)	3rd	1957	2nd (winners)
Concord	Concord Oval, Concord	Black	1949	3rd	1957	11th
Corrimal United	Memorial Park, Corrimal	Red and white	1958	2nd	1958	1st (preliminary finalist)
Gladesville-Ryde	Gladesville Sports Ground, Gladesville	Amber and black	1951	3rd	1957	6th
Granville AEK	Macarthur Park, Granville	Amber and black	1885	1st	1959	5th in NSWSFA First Div.
Hakoah	Sydney Athletics Field, Moore Park	Sky Blue and White	1953	3rd	1957	5th
North Side United	Chatswood Oval, Chatswood	Blue and gold	1953	3rd	1957	10th
Prague	Sydney Athletics Field, Moore Park	Sky Blue	1952	3rd	1957	4th (minor semi-finalist)
Sydney Austral	Sydney Cricket Ground No. 2, Moore Park	Red, white and blue	1952	3rd	1957	9th

== Regular season ==
=== Table and results ===
Pos	Team	Pld	W	D	L	GF	GA	GD	Pts	Qualification or relegation
1	Prague (C)	26	21	3	2	109	44	+65	45	1959 Federation Finals
2	APIA	26	19	4	3	72	33	+39	42	1959 Federation Finals
3	Corrimal United	26	16	4	6	66	51	+15	36	1959 Federation Finals
4	Hakoah	26	13	5	8	54	42	+12	31	1959 Federation Finals
5	Canterbury-Marrickville	26	13	3	10	56	45	+11	29	
6	Auburn	26	10	6	10	70	63	+7	26	
7	North Side United	26	9	8	9	50	49	+1	26	
8	Gladesville-Ryde (Note: Deducted four points)	26	9	11	6	49	34	+15	25	
9	Sydney Austral	26	9	5	12	39	52	−13	23	
10	Granville AEK	26	7	8	11	59	62	−3	22	
11	Budapest	26	7	5	14	61	86	−25	19	
12	Bankstown	26	5	5	16	39	80	−41	15	
13	Balgownie Rangers	26	4	5	17	37	65	−28	13	
14	Concord (R)	26	2	4	20	34	89	−55	8	Relegation to NSWSF Second Division for next season.

Rules for classification: 1) points; 2) goal difference; 3) number of goals scored.
(C) Champions; (R) Relegated

=== Results ===
Home \ Away	API	AUB	BAL	BAN	BUD	CAN	CON	COR	GLR	GRN	HAK	NSU	PRA	SAU
APIA		5–4	2–0	3–1	4–0	1–0	7–1	2–3	5–0	1–0	3–2	2–1	3–4	3–0
Auburn	3–3		4–1	6–2	0–3	4–1	5–1	2–3	2–2	5–1	1–1	1–1	2–5	1–2
Balgownie Rangers	1–2	1–1		2–5	4–2	1–3	2–1	0–2	0–0	0–0	0–3	0–2	0–7	4–1
Bankstown	2–3	1–0	2–1		3–3	1–5	3–1	1–5	1–1	4–4	0–0	0–2	0–3	1–2
Budapest	2–6	4–5	5–3	7–2		2–6	2–2	1–2	3–2	4–4	0–1	1–0	3–6	2–2
Canterbury-Marrickville	1–1	1–2	2–1	3–0	1–2		1–1	3–2	2–1	2–3	0–1	1–2	2–2	1–3
Concord	1–4	1–1	3–2	0–4	4–6	2–1		1–3	2–6	2–4	1–3	1–3	0–6	1–3
Corrimal United	1–1	2–5	3–2	4–3	9–2	0–4	3–3		2–1	2–1	2–1	2–1	0–2	4–1
Gladesville Ryde	2–0	6–0	0–0	3–0	0–0	0–2	2–1	1–1		1–1	3–1	2–3	4–4	2–0
Granville AEK	1–3	7–1	3–0	3–1	8–1	4–5	3–1	1–2	0–3		2–5	0–6	1–2	2–2
Hakoah	1–1	2–1	3–6	3–1	3–1	0–2	4–2	2–1	1–4	0–0		4–4	2–4	5–0
North Side United	0–2	2–7	2–2	0–0	3–2	1–2	1–0	3–3	1–1	3–3	0–5		5–1	1–2
Prague	2–3	4–2	3–1	11–0	3–1	7–3	8–1	6–3	2–2	5–2	3–0	4–2		3–1
Sydney Austral	0–2	1–5	4–3	5–2	3–2	1–2	2–0	1–2	0–0	1–1	0–1	1–1	1–2	

Legend: Blue = home team win; Yellow = draw; Red = away team win.

== Finals series ==
Semi-finals
Major semi-final
1	Prague	1
2	APIA Leichhardt	0
Minor semi-final
3	Corrimal	2
4	Hakoah	4

Final
2	APIA Leichhardt	4
4	Hakoah	3

Grand Final
1	Prague	3
3	APIA Leichhardt	2

=== Semi-finals ===
19 September 1959 Minor semi-final	Corrimal United	2–4	Hakoah

20 September 1959 Major semi-final	Prague	1–0	APIA Leichhardt

=== Final ===
27 September 1959	APIA Leichhardt	4–3	Hakoah

=== Grand final ===
4 October 1959
Grand Final

Prague	3–2	APIA Leichhardt
	Report

Henson Park, Marrickville
Attendance: 12,451
Referee: Roy Rearce

GK	1	(Australia) Ron Lord
RB	2	(Australia) Ken Hiron (capt.)
LB	3	(Germany) Les Scheinflug
RH	4	(Australia) Stuart Sherwin
CH	5	(Australia) Kevin O'Neill
LH	6	(Austria) Karl Jaros
OR	7	(Austria) Erich Schwarz
IR	8	(Austria) Walter Tamandl
CF	9	(Austria) Leo Baumgartner
IL	10	(Hungary) Andreas Saghi
OL	11	(Austria) Herbert Ninaus
Coach:
(Austria) Leo Baumgartner

GK	1	(Australia) Max Trisic
RB	2	(Australia) L. Stedman
LB	3	(Australia) R. Hawkshaw
RH	4	(Australia) G. Cinat
CH	5	(Australia) Joe Marston (capt.)
LH	6	(Australia) G. Alocca
OR	7	(Australia) I. Pittioni
IR	8	(Australia) Joe Vasvary
CF	9	(Australia) A. De Paoli
IL	10	(Australia) P. Turella
OL	11	(Australia) Phil Bottalico
Coach:
(Australia) G. Polgar

NSWSF First Division
1959 Premiers

Prague
First Title

== Awards and statistics ==
The following awards were reported on by Soccer World in the lead up to the league grand final.

=== Player of the Year ===
Rank	Player of the Year
1	Bobby Young (Corrimal United) and Joe Vasvary (APIA)
3	Walter Tamandl (Prague)
4	John Wong (North Side United)
5	Les Scheinflug (Prague)
6	Karl Jaros (Prague)

=== Top goal-scorers ===
Rank	Player	Goals
1	Leo Baumgartner (Prague)	29
2	Bruce Morrow (Auburn)	28
3	Walter Tamandl (Prague)	27
4	Joe Galambos (Budapest)	23

=== Other awards ===
Award	Person
Captain of the Year	Ken Hiron (Prague)
Coach of the Year	G. Polgar (APIA)
Referee of the Year	Roy Pearce

=== Teams of the Year ===
"A" Team	Position	"B" Team
K. Speigel (Hakoah)	Goalkeeper	W. Henderson (Auburn)
J. Prestwell (Gladesville)	Right back	L. Stedman (APIA)
J. Aird (Hakoah)	Left back	R. Hawkshaw (APIA)
Karl Jaros (Prague)	Right half	Phil Peters (Corrimal)
J. Curry (Canterbury)	Center half	J. Pettigrew (Gladesville)
Bobby Young (Corrimal)	Left half	Les Scheinflug (Prague)
Bruce Morrow (Auburn)	Outside right	A. Levinson (Hakoah)
Joe Vasvary (APIA)	Inside right	Walter Tamandl (Prague)
Keith Learmonth (Corrimal)	Centre forward	Joe Galambos (Budapest)
John Wong (North Side Utd)	Inside left	Andreas Saghi (Prague)
Barry Salisbury (Canterbury)	Outside left	Herbert Ninaus (Prague)

Club championship (unofficial)

Club	Points
APIA Leichhardt	107
Canterbury-Marrickville	107
Hakoah	89
Auburn	82
Prague	80
Granville AEK	80
North Side United	74
Gladesville-Ryde	69
Bankstown	71
Sydney Austral	47
Budapest	45
Concord	37

Note: Corrimal United and Balgownie Rangers are not included as they did not field a third grade team.

== Other competitions ==
=== Ampol Cup ===
Originally formed in 1957 as the William Kennard Cup, this was the third year of competition and the first to be solely known as the Ampol Cup.

Final

15 April 1959
Final

Prague	7–0	Auburn

=== Ascot Thousand Federation Cup ===
This was the third year contesting the Federation Cup, named the Ascot Thousand for sponsorship reasons.

Final

25 October 1959
15:45 AEST (UTC+10:00)
Final

Prague	0–2	Hakoah

Redfern Oval, Redfern
Attendance: 10,500
Referee: Roy Pearce
