= Thomas Barlow =

Thomas Barlow may refer to:

== Politicians ==
- Thomas Barlow (merchant) (1788–1844), New Brunswick merchant, banker and politician
- Thomas Barlow (New York politician) (1805–1896), New York lawyer and politician
- Thomas Barlow (Kentucky politician) (1940–2017), U.S. Congressman from Kentucky

== Sportspeople ==
- Thomas Barlow (basketball) (1896–1983), American basketball player
- Tom Barlow (baseball) (1852–?), American baseball player
- Tom Barlow (rugby union) (1864–1942), Welsh international rugby player and cricketer
- Tom Barlow (English footballer) (1874–?), British football player
- Tom Barlow (American soccer) (born 1995), American soccer player

== Others ==
- Thomas Barlow (bishop) (1607–1691), British librarian and bishop
- Sir Thomas Barlow, 1st Baronet (1845–1945), British physician
- Sir Thomas Barlow, 3rd Baronet (1914–2003), British naval commander, grandson of the above
- Thomas Barlow (British businessman) (1883–1964), British businessman
- Thomas Oldham Barlow (1824–1889), British printmaker
- Thomas Worthington Barlow (1823–1856), British antiquary
- Tom Barlow (musician) (born c. 1965), Canadian singer
- T. B. Walker (Thomas Barlow Walker, 1840–1928), American timber tycoon and art collector
