= Bill Hume (footballer) =

Association football player (1937–2005)

Personal information
- Full name: William McLeod Hume
- Date of birth: 1 December 1937
- Place of birth: Alloa, Scotland
- Date of death: 10 December 2005 (aged 68)
- Position: Forward

Youth career
- 1955–1956: Hibernian

Senior career*
Years	Team	Apps	(Gls)
1957	Morrinsville Rangers		
1958–1959	Hamilton Wanderers		
1959–1960	Gladesville-Ryde SC		
1961–1964	Sydney Hakoah		
1965	Hamilton AFC		
- Claudelands Rovers

International career
1958	New Zealand	5	(6)
1959	Australia XI	2	(0)
- * Club domestic league appearances and goals

William McLeod Hume (1 December 1937 – 10 December 2005) was a footballer who played as a Forward.

== Career ==
Born in Alloa, Scotland, Hume signed as an apprentice for Hibernian in 1955, before emigrating to New Zealand the following year. Hume represented both New Zealand and Australia at international level.

His senior career began with Morrinsville Rangers shortly after arriving in New Zealand. Hume was then selected for the Waikato regional representative side before signing with Hamilton Wanderers. He then moved to Australia to join Gladesville-Ryde SC in 1959, scoring 29 goals in the 1960 NSWSF season. In December 1960 Hume transferred to Sydney Hakoah for a deal reported to be in excess of £1000. He returned to New Zealand in the mid 1960s playing out his career with Waikato club sides Hamilton AFC (a 1964 merger of Hamilton Technical Old Boys and Hamilton Wanderers) and Claudelands Rovers.

Hume made his full All Whites debut in a 3–2 loss to Australia on 16 August 1958 and made four more appearances over the following month, scoring a total of six goals, the last of his A-international caps being in a 2–1 win over New Caledonia on 14 September 1958.

He moved to Australia in 1959 and later that year he made his two appearances for Australia in unofficial matches against Scottish club Heart of Midlothian in Sydney and Melbourne, scoring in the Melbourne match.

== Death ==
Hume died of a heart attack on St Andrews golf course on 10 December 2005.
