= Barlow baronets of Fort William (1803) =

Baronetcy in India under British rule

The Barlow baronetcy, of Fort William in Bengal, was created in the Baronetage of the United Kingdom on 29 June 1803 for George Barlow. He was Provisional Governor-General of India from 1805 to 1807 and Governor of Madras from 1807 to 1813. He was succeeded by his son, the second Baronet, a Judge of the Supreme Court of Calcutta. His line of the family failed on the death of his unmarried son, the third Baronet, in 1889. The late Baronet was succeeded by his first cousin, the fourth Baronet: the son of Richard Wellesley Barlow, younger son of the first Baronet. His grandson, the fifth Baronet, was a Colonel in the Royal Artillery.

== Barlow baronets, of Fort William (1803) ==
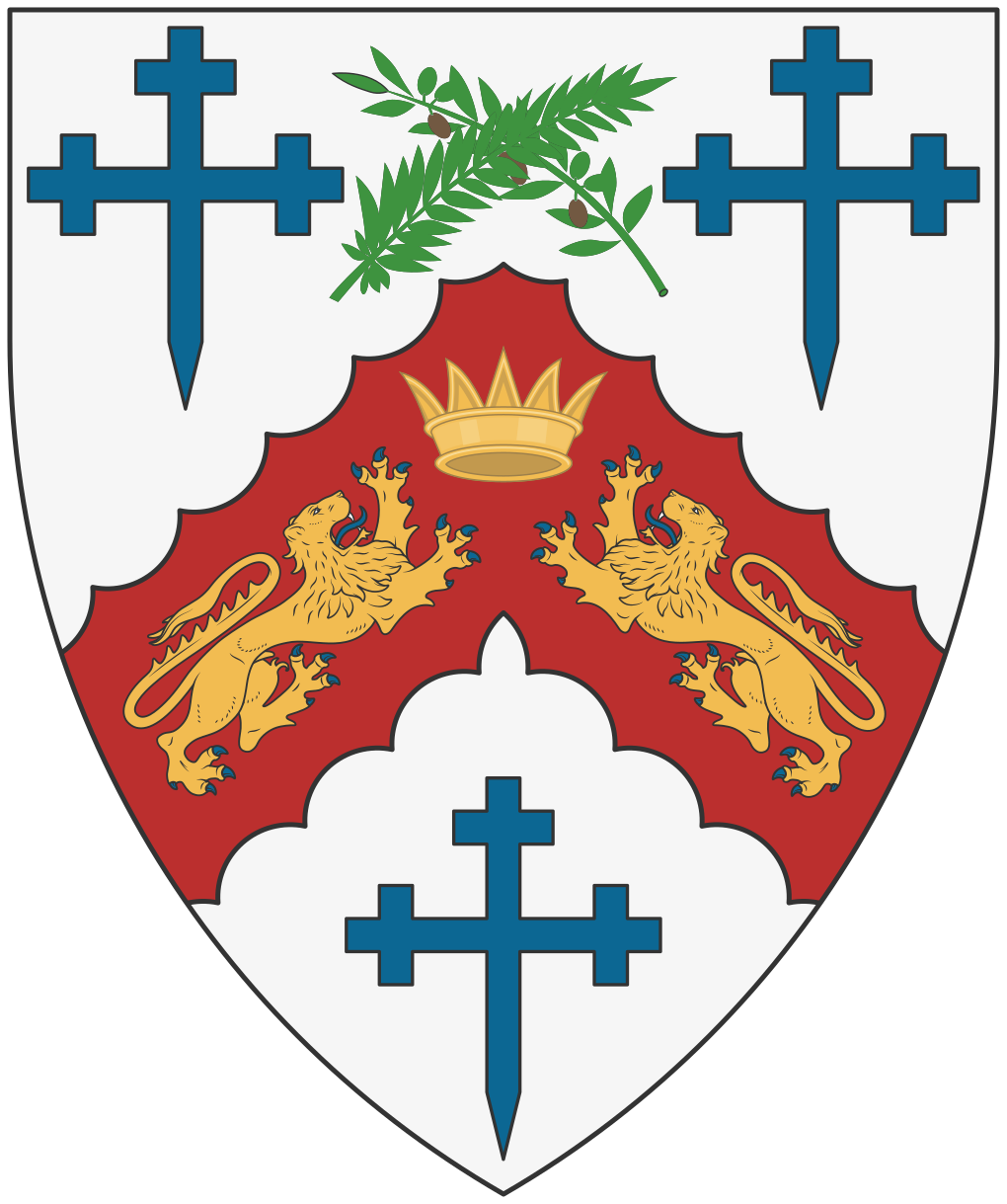
Arms of Barlow of Fort William

- Sir George Hilaro Barlow, 1st Baronet (1762–1846)
- Sir Robert Barlow, 2nd Baronet (1797–1857)
- Sir Morison Barlow, 3rd Baronet (1835–1889)
- Sir Richard Wellesley Barlow, 4th Baronet (1836–1904)
- Sir Hilaro William Wellesley Barlow, 5th Baronet (1861–1941)
- Sir Richard Hugh Barlow, 6th Baronet (1904–1946)
- Sir Christopher Hilaro Barlow, 7th Baronet (1929–2022)
- Sir Crispian John Edmund Audley Barlow, 8th Baronet (born 1958)

The heir presumptive is Peter Stephen Barlow (born 1961), a kinsman of the present holder.

== Notes ==
Baronetage of the United Kingdom
Preceded by Stronge baronets	Barlow baronets of Fort William; 29 June 1803	Succeeded by Wedderburn baronets
