= Francis Barlow =

Francis Barlow may refer to:

- Francis Barlow (artist) (c. 1626–1704), British painter, etcher, and illustrator
- Francis C. Barlow (1834–1896), US lawyer, politician, and general

== See also ==
- Frank Barlow (disambiguation)
