= Guy's Hospital Reports =

- Language: English

Publication details
- History: 1836–1974
- Publisher: Guy's Hospital (England)

Standard abbreviations
- ISO 4: Guy's Hosp. Rep.

Indexing
- CODEN: GHREAA
- ISSN: 0017-5889
- OCLC no.: 01462583

Guy's Hospital Reports was a medical journal of clinical practice that was published by Guy's Hospital of London from 1836 to 1974. Initially edited by George H. Barlow, it covered case reports and other topics arising in the large teaching hospital. Other editors have included Sir Henry Greenway Howse.
