= Robert Barlow =

Robert Barlow may refer to:

- Robert Barlow (Royal Navy officer) (1757–1843), Royal Navy officer
- Robert Barlow (cartographer) (1813–1883), Canadian cartographer
- Robert Barlow (cricketer) (1827–1907), English cricketer and British Army officer
- R. H. Barlow (1918–1951), American author
- Bob Barlow (born 1935), Canadian ice hockey player
