= Helen Belyea =

Canadian geologist

Helen Reynolds Belyea
- Born: February 11, 1913; Saint John, New Brunswick
- Died: May 20, 1986 (aged 73); Calgary, Alberta
- Awards: Order of Canada

Northwestern University is where Belyea earned her Ph.D. in 1939

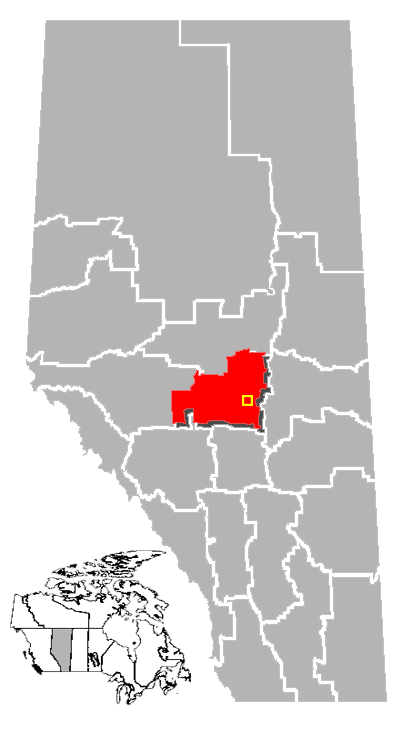
Location of Leduc, Alberta, the city in which Belyea was sent to monitor the oil discovery. She was one of the two geologists sent.

Helen Reynolds Belyea, OC FRSC (February 11, 1913 – May 20, 1986), was a Canadian geologist best known for her research in Western Canada on the Devonian System, a geologic period of the Paleozoic era.

== Personal life ==
Belyea was born in Saint John, New Brunswick, to a family with French Huguenot origins. Her parents were William Belyea and Elizabeth McDonald.

Belyea was also active in mountaineering, skiing, walking, and horseback riding. She often rode horseback in the mountains of Alberta, British Columbia and the Great Slave Lake area. She was a member of the Calgary Continuing Arts Association, the Women's League of the Calgary Philharmonic and associate director of the Calgary Zoological Society.

Belyea promoted feminism in her field as a result of her presence within the geological world. Societal norms of the 19th century confined women to the role of housewives, however Belyea's notable contributions and efforts enabled her to work in the field alongside men as equals. She became the first woman to work in the field studies, proving that women were capable of working in the same field as men. As women got accepted into jobs in the field of geology, they faced significant challenges in securing respectable positions. Notably, these women were expected to remain unmarried, marriage often resulted in the loss of their jobs. It is likely that as a result of this, Belyea never married. Helen Belyea established herself as an authority figure within her field of study, specifically her research and analysis of the Devonian geologic system in Western Canada.

Belyea formally retired in 1975 after 35 years of contribution to the Geological Survey of Canada. However, her study of geology didn't end with her retirement as she continued working with the Institute of Sedimentary and Petroleum Geology.

On May 20, 1986, Helen Belyea died at the age of 73 in Calgary, Alberta.

== Education ==
Belyea received both her Bachelor's and Master's degrees in geology from Dalhousie University in Nova Scotia, she was the only woman in her class and was also President of the Dawson Geology Club. She went on to earn a Ph.D. from Northwestern University in Evanston, Illinois, in 1939. Her doctoral thesis was titled "The Geology of Musquach Area, New Brunswick." After receiving her doctorate in geology, Belyea worked as a teacher in private high schools, both in Victoria and Toronto. During the Second World War, Belyea contributed to the war efforts in Ottawa, joining and eventually becoming a lieutenant in the Women's Royal Canadian Naval Service in the Naval Service HQ. Belyea finished her career within the Naval Service in May 1945, after being released from service.

Following her scientific career within geology Belyea received two honorary doctorates, an Honorary Doctor of Science from the University of Windsor in 1976 and an Honorary Doctor of Laws from the Dalhousie University in 1977.

During her education, Belyea also acted as a thesis supervisor for fellow female geologist Dr. Frances Wagner's master's thesis between 1948 and 1950.

== Research and career ==
After her release from Naval Service in 1945 the Geological Survey of Canada (GSC) hired Belyea to become a technologist. In 1947, Belyea was promoted to the position of geologist. Her career within the GSC originated in Ottawa however, in 1950 she transferred to the office in Calgary, Alberta. This made Belyea the second woman to work for the Geological Survey of Canada, second to Dr. Alice Wilson. During February of the same year, oil was struck in Leduc, Alberta, which Belyea was sent to monitor three years later in 1950. In Leduc, Belyea specifically studied the rock segments that were at the surface as a result of the oil drills. She used this information to map the geology to further predict where oil would likely be found. After the oil was struck, the Geological Survey opened an office in Calgary, Belyea was then sent to monitor the discovery. This office eventually led to the creation of the Institute of Sedimentary and Petroleum Geology in 1967.

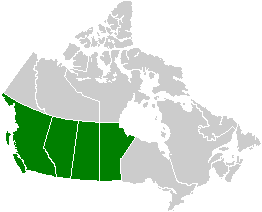
Map of Western Canada, where most of Belyea's research took place.

Throughout her career in geology, Belyea wrote and published over 30 scientific papers. Her first paper, on facies relations and reef-off-reef sequences in the upper Devonian, was published in Geological Survey of Canada in 1952. The Devonian system, a geological period from the Paleozoic era 358 to 419 million years ago, along with studying the reefs, helped Belyea to map what Alberta looked like 350 million years ago. She is best known for her contribution on the volume 'The Atlas' in the Geological History of Western Canada, where she wrote maps and text for the whole Devonian region. This was based on her work from the late 1950s on a geological survey that mapped the Southern Northwest Territories. She specifically contributed on the region west of Hay River and south of the Mackenzie. Her knowledge of the regional geology helped produce a synthesis for the Devonian rocks of that region. Other written works of Helen Belyea include her book "The Story of the Banff National Park" which was published in 1960. Being the first in a series of geological pamphlets, the 121 pages are intended for the National Park's interpretation staff.

In 1976, Belyea was made an Officer of the Order of Canada. Here is the ribbon bar for that distinction.

Belyea was noticed for her contribution to geology in Alberta, where she spent 35 years with the Geological Survey of Canada. Her many awards included the Barlow Memorial Medal for her paper, "Distribution and Lithology of Organic Carbonate Unit of Upper Fairholme Group, Alberta," awarded in 1958, from the Canadian Institute of Mining, Metallurgy and Petroleum. She was the first woman honoured this way. She was elected a Fellow of the Royal Society of Canada in 1962, which was a rare achievement for a woman, and was later made an honorary member of the Canadian Society of Petroleum Geologists in 1964. In 1966, Helen Belyea became the co-chairman of the First International Symposium on the Devonian System, which the Alberta Society of Petroleum Geologists sponsored. She was one of two geologists sent to open a Calgary office and the only woman to do field work there. In 1976, she was made an Officer of the Order of Canada.

== Works cited ==
- Fleming, Iris. "Rocks are Her Forte." Geosciences. Fall 1975, pp. 12–14.
- McLaren, Digby J. "Helen Belyea 1913–1986." Transactions of the Royal Society of Canada. Ser. 5, vol. 2. 1987, pp. 198–201.
- Ogilvie, Marilyn, and Harvey, Joy, editors. The Biographical Dictionary of Women in Science. Vol. 1. New York: Routledge, 2000, pp. 110–111.
