= Balgownie Rangers FC =

Balgownie Rangers
- Full name: Balgownie Rangers Football Club
- Nicknames: Bally, Rangers
- Founded: 1883; 143 years ago
- Ground: Judy Masters Oval
- President: Steve Buckley
- First Grade Coach: Justin Potter
- League: Illawarra Premier League 2 (5)
- 2025: The Fraternity Club District League, 8th of 12
- Website: facebook.com
Home colours	Away colours

Balgownie Rangers Football Club is an association football club based in Balgownie, New South Wales. They play in the Illawarra District League. Founded in 1883, Balgownie is believed to be the oldest running association football club in Australia.

== History ==
Balgownie Rangers is the oldest running registered association football club in Australia, being formed in 1883. The club was formed in 1883 where it played against other social clubs and also between Balgownie teams. In 1890, Balgownie Rangers was officially registered to play in the newly formed N.S.W. Football Association.

Balgownie was the 4th club to form in Australia. Wanderers, Arcadian and Granville had formed 1883. Since then all of these clubs have folded, Granville being the last to fold in the early 1980s, making Balgownie Rangers the oldest registered running soccer club in Australia.

The club is full of tradition and has produced many famous football players over the years. Some include James ‘Judy’ Masters (who is listed in the Football Australia Hall of Fame), Tom Thompson, Dave Ward and Frank Smith in the early 1900s, George Barlow in the 1950s and more recently Matt Horsley who went on to captain the Wollongong Wolves, win 4 National Soccer League titles and also represent Australia. Matt has recently retired his footballing career after finishing as captain of Perth Glory during December 2005.

== Safeway United ==
When the NSW Federation of Soccer Clubs formed a breakaway league in 1957, another team from the Wollongong region, Corrimal Rangers voted on joining the rebel league, however the motion was refused. Many of the players and staff would form a new club called Corrimal United to play in the Federation league in 1958 with the Corrimal Rangers continuing to play in the Association league (just as Balgownie did). Corrimal United won the minor premiership in its first season. By 1960, with the Association league now abolished, Corrimal United amalgamated with Woonona-Bulli, also from the Wollongong region, to form South Coast United. This team would continue to participate in the federation premiership until 1972 when the name would be changed to Safeway United. The club would also win one championship in 1963 and two minor premierships in 1966 and 1969.

In 1974, Balgownie finished second on the league table in NSW Federation Division Two earning promotion into NSW Federation Division One for the following year. As Safeway United was already competing in Division One, for the 1975 season it was decided the clubs would pool their resources, merging as a single entity but playing under the Balgownie Rangers moniker, with Balgownie effectively absorbing Safeway United. The merged club would be called Wollongong City for the 1976 and 1977 seasons. In 1978, the Rangers would return to the Illawarra District League.

== Seasons ==
Divisional History

- Initially competed in matches with the South Coast British Football Association / New South Wales Soccer Football Association
- When the Federation of Soccer Clubs broke away from the Association, Balgownie continued to play with Association until its final year of competition in 1958, joining the Federation in its Division One for the 1959 season.
- Balgownie continued competing in Federation tournaments until 1975 with the exception of 1964 to 1966 when they amalgamated with local district side, Hellas, and competed as Wollongong Olympic. In seasons 1976 and 1977, Balgownie participated with Safeway United as Wollongong City before returning to the Illawarra Soccer Association in 1978 as Balgownie Rangers.

Year	Division	Placed	Trophies
1905	South Coast British Association Football	2nd	
1906	South Coast British Association Football	2nd	4th Grade Champions
1907	South Coast British Association Football	1st	1st Grade Champions
1908	South Coast British Association Football	2nd	3rd Grade Champions
1909	South Coast British Association Football	2nd	3rd Grade Champions
1910	South Coast British Association Football	1st	1st, 2nd, 3rd & 4th Grade Champions
1911	South Coast British Association Football	2nd	
1921	South Coast British Association Football	1st	Undefeated Champions
1957	NSW Soccer Football Association	1st	Sydney Cup Winners
1958	NSW Soccer Football Association		
1959	NSW Div. 1	13th	
1960	NSW Div. 1	13th	Relegated
1961	NSW Div. 2	3rd	
1962	NSW Div. 2	2nd	
1963	NSW Div. 2	3rd	
1967	NSW Div. 2	10th	
1968	NSW Div. 2	5th	
1969	NSW Div. 2		
1970	NSW Div. 2	4th	
1971	NSW Div. 2	5th	
1972	NSW Div. 2	5th	
1973	NSW Div. 2	2nd	
1974	NSW Div. 2	2nd	
1975	NSW Div. 1	9th	
1990	Illawarra Premier League	5th	
1991	Illawarra Premier League	4th	Illawarra Premier League Grand Final Winners
1992	Illawarra Premier League	4th	
1993	Illawarra Premier League	7th	
1994	Illawarra Premier League	8th	
1995	Illawarra Premier League	6th	
1996	Illawarra Premier League	8th	Illawarra Premier League Player of the Year – Andrew Naylor
1997	Illawarra Premier League	11th	Relegated
1998	Conference League		Illawarra Conference League Reserve Grade League Champions; Illawarra Conference League Reserve Grade Grand Final Winners
1999	Conference League	16th	
2000	Conference League	2nd	Illawarra Conference League First Grade Grand Final Runners-Up; Illawarra Conference League Reserve Grade Grand Final Winners
2001	Illawarra Premier League	5th	Fraternity Cup Runners-Up; Illawarra Women's Soccer League – Bonnie Lassie Cup Winners ‘Balgownie Babes’
2002	Illawarra Premier League	11th	Fraternity Cup Winners; Illawarra Youth Cup Winners
2003	Illawarra Premier League	11th	Illawarra Premier League Fair Play Award
2004	Illawarra Premier League	9th	Illawarra Premier League Player of the Year – Adam Hughes; Balgownie-Tarrawanna Derby Cup Winners
2005	Illawarra Premier League	14th	Relegated
2006	District League – 1st Division	5th	
2007	District League – 1st Division	4th	
2008	District League – 1st Division	1st	Illawarra District League First Grade League Champions
2009	District League – 1st Division	1st	Illawarra District League First Grade League Champions; Illawarra District League Division One (Reserve Grade) League Champions; Illawarra District League Division One (Reserve Grade) Grand Final Winners; Illawarra District League Best & Fairest – Glen Smede; Illawarra District League (First Grade) Top Goal Scorer – Joshua Faulks
2010	District League – 1st Division	1st	Illawarra District League First Grade League Champions; Illawarra District League First Grade Grand Final Winners; Illawarra District League Matt Horsley Medal – Rick Metcalf; Illawarra District League Coach of the Year – Stewart Oliver; Illawarra District League Best & Fairest – Joshua Faulks; Illawarra District League (First Grade) Top Goal Scorer – Joshua Faulks (24 goals); Illawarra District League (Youth Grade) Top Goal Scorer – Daniel Vardareff (18 goals)
2011	District League – 1st Division	3rd	Illawarra District League Reserve Grade League Champions; Illawarra District League Youth Grade League Champions; Illawarra District League Youth Grade Grand Final Winners
2012	District League – 1st Division	6th	
2013	District League – 1st Division	6th	Illawarra Women's Division 2 League Champions
2014	District League – 1st Division	13th	
2015	District League – 1st Division	12th	
2016	District League – 1st Division	5th	
2017	District League – 1st Division	8th	Women's 21W League Champions & Grand Final Winners
2018	District League – 1st Division	7th	
2019	District League – 1st Division	9th	
2020	District League – 1st Division	10th	Youth Grade League Champions
2021	District League – 1st Division	10th	
2022	District League – 1st Division	8th	
2023	District League – 1st Division	6th	
2024	District League – 1st Division	7th	
2025	District League – 1st Division	8th	

== Honours and awards ==
- (New South Wales) Illawarra Premier League
  - Champions (1): 1991
- (New South Wales) Illawarra District League
  - Premiers (3): 2008, 2009, 2010
  - Champions (1): 2010
