= Frances Wagner =

Canadian paleontologist and public servant

Frances Joan Estelle Wagner FRCGS (28 May 1927 – 8 November 2016) was a Canadian paleontologist and public servant. Specializing in the use of micropaleontology to study marine geology, she was one of the first female scientists to be permitted to conduct fieldwork by the Geological Survey of Canada, and in 1973 was elected as a Fellow of the Royal Canadian Geographical Society in recognition of her achievements and scientific research.

== Early life and education ==
Born on 28 May 1927 in Hamilton, Ontario, Wagner was the daughter of Muriel (née Konkle) and Harold Wagner. She had one younger brother, David, with whom she spent many hours of her youth exploring the flora, fauna and geology of the Canadian Shield around her family's Muskoka vacation cottage on Mary Lake. In addition to exploration of the natural environment, Wagner's love of the outdoors also meant she became an accomplished canoeist, long distance swimmer, and horsewoman.

Wagner graduated with a BA degree from the University of Toronto in 1948, having specialized in paleontology, and remained at the same institution to complete an MA in invertebrate paleontology in 1950. Her research work for this higher degree focused on the stratigraphy and fauna of an Ordovician limestone sequence within a small quarry to the northeast of Ottawa. During the middle summer of her MA studies, in 1949, Wagner was employed by the Geological Survey of Canada (GSC) to catalogue samples at the Victoria Museum in Ottawa, and she began work full-time with the GSC on her 23rd birthday in May 1950. After a year in the field, she went to Stanford University where she earned her doctorate in Pleistocene paleontology. Her PhD, completed in 1954, focused on micropaleontology.

== Research career ==
At the time of her hiring by the GSC, Wagner was one of only three female research scientists working within the survey, alongside fellow paleontologist Alice Wilson, and sedimentologist and oil field geologist Helen Belyea; Wilson was instrumental in bringing Wagner into the organization.

== Personal life ==
Frances Wagner died at the age of 89, on 8 November 2016 in Falmouth, Nova Scotia.
