= Geological Survey of Canada =

Canadian government agency

- Commission géologique du Canada

Agency overview
- Formed: 1842
- Jurisdiction: Government of Canada
- Headquarters: Ottawa, Ontario
- Employees: 600
- Annual budget: CAD $97 million
- Minister responsible: Tim Hodgson, Minister of Energy and Natural Resources

The Geological Survey of Canada (GSC; French: Commission géologique du Canada, CGC) is a Canadian federal government agency responsible for performing geological surveys of the country developing Canada's natural resources and protecting the environment. A branch of the Geoscience and Earth Monitoring Sector of Natural Resources Canada, the GSC is the country's oldest scientific agency and was one of its first government organizations.

== History ==
In September 1841, the Province of Canada legislature passed a resolution that authorized the sum of £1,500 sterling be granted to the government for the estimated expense of performing a geological survey of the province. In 1842, the Geological Survey of Canada was formed to fulfill this request.

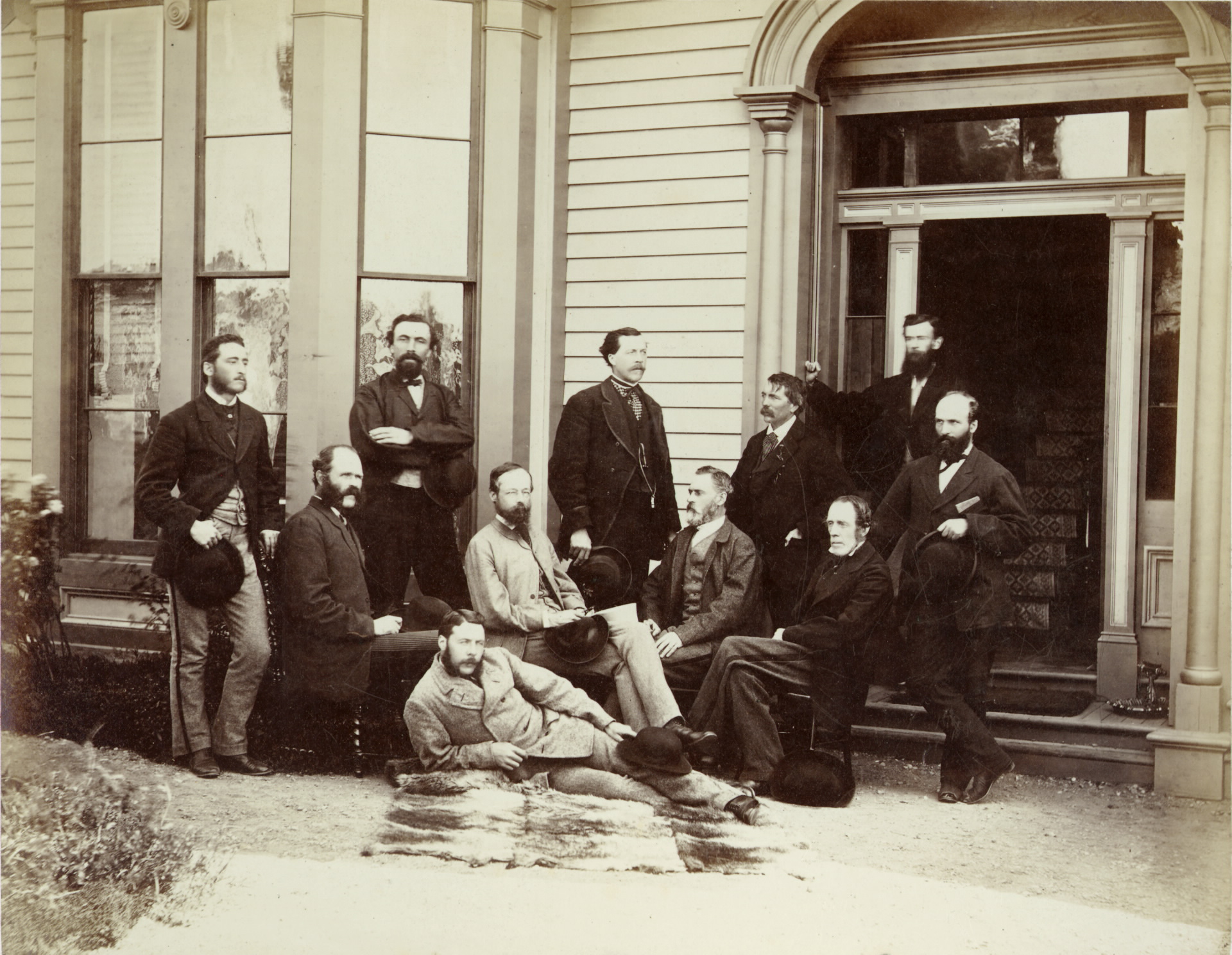
The First Canadian Pacific R.R. and Geological Survey parties for British Columbia, July 22, 1871. Photographer: Benjamin F Baltzy. Courtesy: Toronto Public Library Digital Collections

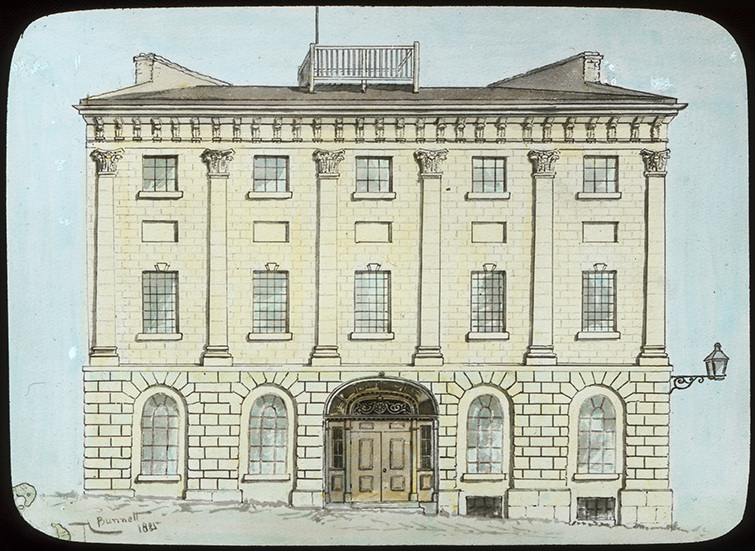
Geological Survey of Canada building in Montreal, 1852–1874

William Edmond Logan was in Montreal at the time and made it known that he was interested in participating in this survey. Gaining recommendations from prominent British scientists, Logan was appointed the first GSC director on April 14, 1842. Four months later, Logan arrived in Kingston, Ontario, to compile the existing body of knowledge of Canada's geology. In the spring of 1843, Logan established the GSC's headquarters in Montreal (in his brother's warehouse and then in a rented house on Great St. James Street (now Saint Jacques Street). One of the prominent cartographers and the chief topographical draughtsman was Robert Barlow, who began his work in 1855. Chemist T. Sterry Hunt joined in the early days and the Survey added paleontological capability in 1856 with the arrival of Elkanah Billings. After Aylesworth Perry was appointed as acting librarian in 1881 he prepared the catalogue of reference works on geology, mineralogy, metallurgy, chemistry and natural history. George Mercer Dawson became a staff member in 1875, progressed to assistant director in 1883 and finally to director of the Geological Survey of Canada in 1895. The Geological Survey of Canada first began allowing women to conduct fieldwork in the early 1950s. Dr. Alice Wilson, the first of these women, lobbied for the inclusion of paleontologist Frances Wagner shortly afterward. Around this same time, the GSC employed a third woman Dr. Helen Belyea.

== Programs and activities ==
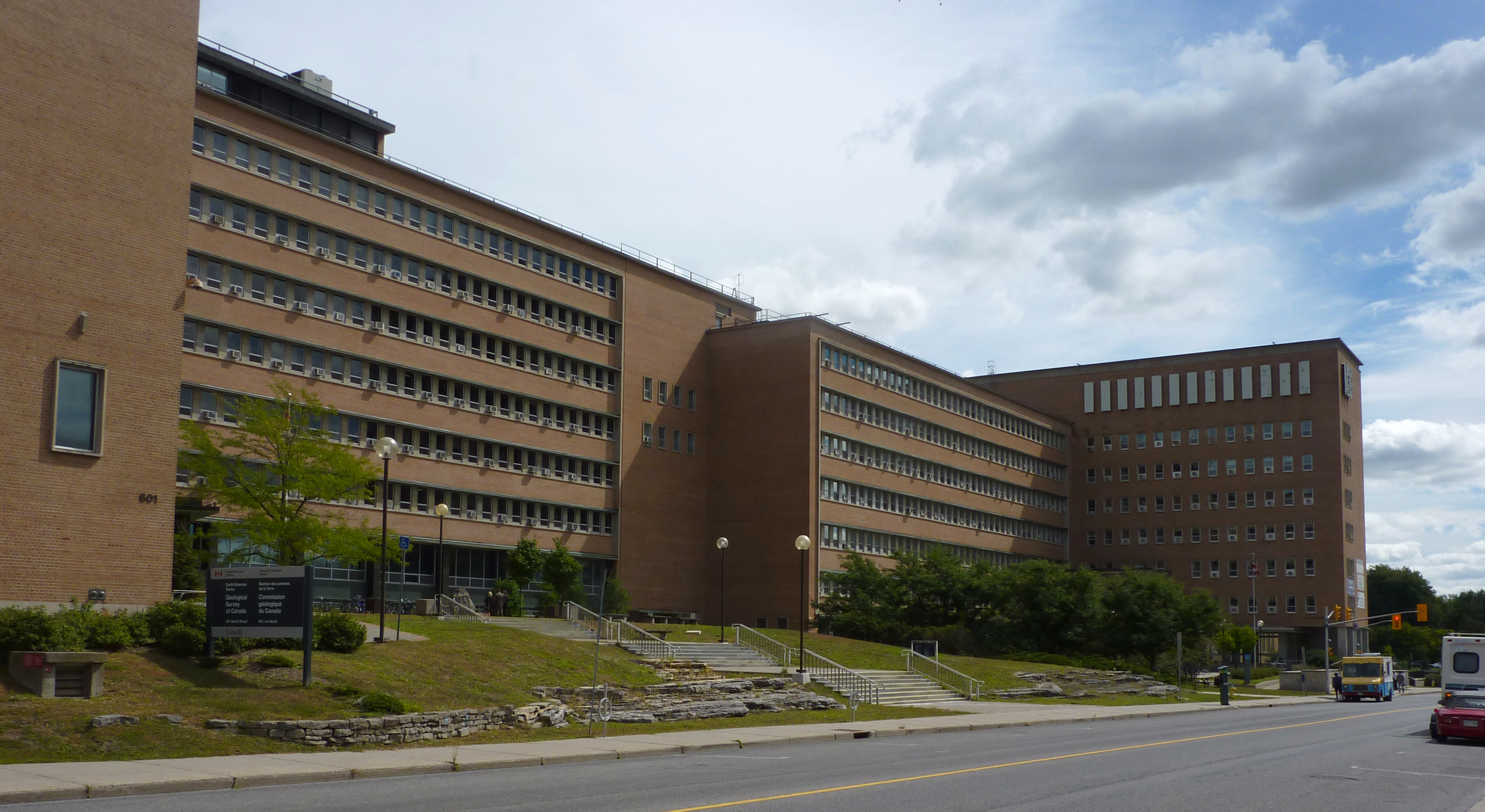
Geological Survey of Canada building, Ottawa

=== 1. Geoscience for mineral and Northern Development ===
Canada has the geoscience required to attract mineral investment across Canada, to inform sustainable development of the North, and to work with allied countries to become a leading supplier of responsibly developed minerals.

=== 2. Geoscience for land management ===
Canada has the geoscience required to inform responsible resource development and environmental stewardship in both terrestrial and marine environments, and to support its extended continental shelf submissions to the United Nations.

=== 3. Geoscience for climate and disaster resilience ===
Decision makers and communities have access to the geoscience that they need to make Canada more resilient to natural hazards and climate change, and to achieve a net-zero future.

== See also ==
- Geology of Canada
- Former Geological Survey of Canada Building
