= Barstow (surname) =

Barstow is a surname. Notable people with the surname include:

- Arthur Edward Barstow (1888–1942), officer in the British Indian Army
- David Barstow (born 1963), American journalist
- Gamaliel H. Barstow (1784–1865), American representative from NY 1831–1833
- George Barstow (civil servant) (1874–1966), British civil servant
- Gideon Barstow (1783–1852), American representative from Massachusetts
- John Anderson Barstow (1893–1941), British Army officer and brother of Arthur Edward Barstow
- John L. Barstow (1832–1913), American teacher and politician
- Josephine Barstow (born 1940), English soprano
- Stan Barstow (1928–2011), English novelist
- Susie M. Barstow (1836–1923), American painter
- Percy Barstow (1883–1969), UK Member of Parliament 1941–1950
- William A. Barstow (1813–1865), third governor of Wisconsin

Fictional person:

- Bonnie Barstow, character in the Knight Rider TV series

== See also ==
- Bartow (name)
