= Scott Barrow =

Scott Barrow may refer to:

- Scott Barrow (footballer) (born 1988), Welsh footballer
- Scott Barrow (born 1987), Australian rapper known as Kerser
- Scott Barrow (rugby) (born 1980), British rugby union and rugby league player

== See also ==
- Scott Barlow (disambiguation)
- Scott Barrows (born 1963), American football player
