= Stephen Barlow =

Stephen Barlow may refer to:

- Stephen Barlow (conductor) (born 1954), British conductor
- Stephen Barlow (director) (born 1973), Australian opera director
- Stephen Barlow (Pennsylvania politician) (1779–1845), member of the U.S. House of Representatives
- Steve Barlow of The Two Steves
- Stephen Hart Barlow (1895–1962), Quartermaster General of New Jersey
- Stephen Steele Barlow (1818–1900), Attorney General of Wisconsin, legislator

== See also ==
- Barlow (surname)
