= Barlowe =

Barlowe is a British surname. Notable people with the surname include:

- Arthur Barlowe (1550–1620), English explorer
- Wayne Barlowe (born 1958), science fiction and fantasy painter

Fictional characters:

- Beverly Barlowe, a character on the television series Eureka
- Barlowe, a main character in the videogame Castlevania: Order of Ecclesia

== See also ==
- Barlow (surname)
- Bartow (name)
