= Robert Barlow (cartographer) =

Robert Barlow (18 February 1813 – 16 February 1883) was a cartographer and topographical draftsman from England who spent most of his career there with the Ordnance Survey of Great Britain.

Barlow and his family came to Canada in 1855 as a recruit of William Edmond Logan for the Geological Survey of Canada. He became the chief draughtsman and contributed greatly to the survey with the production of topographical maps. Much of his work was published although he was not always given proper credit at the time.

He was a top rate topographical draughtsman and made a large contribution to Canada in that field.
