= Sam Barlow =

Sam Barlow may refer to:

- Sam Barlow (rugby league) (born 1985), rugby league player for Halifax R.L.F.C.
- Samuel L. M. Barlow I (1826–1889), American lawyer
- Samuel L. M. Barlow II (1892–1982), American composer
- Sam Barlow (game designer), British video game director and writer
- Sam Barlow (pioneer) (1795–1867), U.S. pioneer toll road builder
  - Sam Barlow High School, Gresham, Oregon, USA
- Sam Barlow, fictional character from Home and Away, see List of Home and Away characters

== See also ==
- Sam Barlow Williams (1921–2009), U.S. inventor
