= David Barlow =

David Barlow may refer to:

- David Barlow (basketball) (born 1983), Australian basketball player
- David Barlow (Coronation Street), a fictional character in the British soap Coronation Street
- David Barlow (judge) (born 1971), United States Attorney for the district of Utah
- David Barlow (biologist), British biologist and filmmaker
- David H. Barlow (born 1942), American psychologist
- A fictional character in the 2012 film Safe House
