= Bartow (name) =

Bartow is a given name and surname. Notable people with the name include:

== Surname ==
- Edward Bartow (1870–1958), American chemist
- Francis S. Bartow (1816–1861), American politician and Confederate officer in the American Civil War
- Gene Bartow (1930–2012), American basketball coach
- Murry Bartow (born 1961), American basketball coach and son of Gene
- Rick Bartow (1946–2016), Native American artist

== Given name ==
- Bartow Sumter Weeks (1861–1922), New York Supreme Court Justice
- Bartow White (1776–1862), American physician and politician

== See also ==
- Barlow (surname)
- Barlowe, surname
- Barstow (surname)
