= Ferdinand Barlow =

French composer

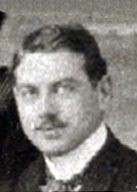
- Born: Ferdinand Frédéric Barlow; 2 October 1881; Mulhouse
- Died: 3 January 1951 (aged 69); Boulogne-Billancourt
- Occupation: Composer

Ferdinand Frédéric "Fred" Barlow (2 October 1881 – 3 January 1951) was a 20th-century French classical composer.

Fred Barlow started music at age 28 and studied with Charles Koechlin in Paris.

In 1926, he joined the Quakers, an engagement which had influence on his music.

== Selected works ==
- Sylvie ou Le Double Amour, opéra comique, libretto by Pierre Bettin after Gérard de Nerval, created in 1923 in Paris
- Mam'zelle Prud'homme, operetta, libretto by C. Bével, created in 1932 in Monte-Carlo
- La Grande Jatte, ballet, accepted at the Opera in 1939 and created during the sommer 1950.

== Bibliography ==
- Raymond Oberlé, « Fernand Fred Barlow », in Nouveau dictionnaire de biographie alsacienne, vol. 2, (p. 108)
