= Henry Clark Barlow =

English writer

- Born: 12 May 1806; Churchyard Row, Newington Butts, Surrey
- Died: 8 November 1876 (aged 70); Salzburg

Henry Clark Barlow, M.D. (May 12, 1806 – November 8, 1876) was an English writer on Dante.

== Early life ==
Barlow was born in Churchyard Row, Newington Butts, Surrey, 12 May 1806. He was the only child of Henry Barlow, who, after spending the years 1799–1804 in the naval service of the East India Company, settled at Newington; passed fourteen years (1808–1822) at Gravesend as a revenue officer; and died at Newington, in his seventy-fifth year, 12 January 1858. Barlow's mother, who lived till 14 January 1864, was Sophia, youngest daughter of Thomas Clark, a solicitor. Barlow was educated at Gravesend and Hall Place, Bexley; and in 1822 was articled to George Smith, an architect and surveyor, of Mercers' Hall. He soon became a student of the Royal Academy.

In 1827, after an accident to his right thumb, he gave up his profession, and spent two years in private study. In 1829 he was in Paris attending the public lectures in the Jardin des Plantes and at the Collège de France. He matriculated at Edinburgh University, after a preliminary course of classical study at Dollar, as a medical student, in November 1831, and took the degree of M.D. on 3 August 1837. After a time he moved to Paris, where he worked on medical and scientific studies, but also on art criticism.

From Paris in 1840, he travelled to Belgium, the River Rhine, and Holland. In the course of these and other journeys, Barlow filled sketch-books and journals with drawings and descriptions, and a cabinet with geological specimens. He returned home to study Italian, and in the spring of 1841 again went to the continent. He spent the summer in Switzerland, in the autumn crossed the St. Gothard Pass to Milan, and remained in Italy nearly five years.

== Student of Dante ==
It was at Pisa, during the winter of 1844–5, that Barlow became acquainted with the works of Dante. In 1846, after revisiting England, he returned to Florence. In October 1847 he made ‘a pilgrimage' to Ravenna, the Mecca of all Dantophilists.’ In 1848 to 1850 he extended his travels.

He published in 1850, from Newington Butts, a short paper, and Barlow's whole subsequent life seems to have been consecrated to further study of Dante. In 1852 he was in Paris, engaged in the examination of the Codici of Dante in libraries. He later collated above 150 other manuscripts in Italy, Germany, Denmark and England. In 1853 Barlow was in Germany, prosecuting his favourite studies; in the autumn of 1854 in the south of France; in 1856 in Denmark and Sweden; and, revisiting Edinburgh in 1857, was attracted to Manchester by the Art Treasures' Exhibition of that year.

In the celebration of the sixth centenary of Dante's birth (14–16 May 1865), at Florence, Barlow took a prominent part. Barlow was also present for a time at the festival which took place at Ravenna on 24–26 June following, in consequence of the recent discovery there of the bones of Dante. Before the first of these two celebrations Victor Emmanuel II of Italy bestowed on Barlow the title of Cavaliere dell' Ordine dei SS. Maurizio e Lazzaro. After the Dante commemoration he spent his time in seclusion and travel at home and abroad.

== Death ==
Barlow died on a tour, at Salzburg, on Wednesday, 8 November 1876. He was at the time a fellow or member of many learned societies in England, Italy and Germany.

== Works ==
In 1851 Barlow was in England, where he published a short work ‘Industry on Christian Principles, London, 1851.

He published at London ‘Letteratura Dantesca: Remarks on the Reading of the 114th Verse of the 7th Canto of the Paradise of the "Divina Commedia"’ (1857), and two years afterwards ‘Francesca da Rimini, her Lament and Vindication; with a brief Notice of the Malatesti’ (1859, 2nd edition, 1875). An Italian translation, ‘Francesca da Rimini, suo Lamento e Difesa,’ &c., in Filippo Scolari's ‘Esercitazioni Dantesche,’ appeared at Venice in 1865. Barlow published in 1862 ‘Il Gran Rifiuto, what it was, who made it, and how fatal to Dante Allighieri,’ on verses 58 to 63 of the 3rd canto of the Inferno; an Italian translation by G. G[uiscardi] appeared at Naples in 1864. Barlow also issued in 1862 ‘Il Conte Ugolino e l'Arcivescovo Ruggieri: a Sketch from the Pisan Chronicles,’ and a fragment of English history, entitled ‘The Young King and Bertrand de Born,’ from which the author deduced an amended reading in line 135 of the 28th canto of the ‘Inferno.’

In 1864 Barlow published the final result of his work on the ‘Divina Commedia,’ ‘Critical, Historical, and Philosophical Contributions to the Study of the "Divina Commedia."’ He described the festivals in his ‘Sixth Centenary Festivals of Dante Allighieri in Florence and at Ravenna. By a Representative’ (London, 1866).

He read a paper, which he had been contemplating since 1854, at the Royal Institute of British Architects, on ‘Symbolism in reference to Art’ (1860), and an article of his on ‘Sacred Trees’ was reprinted ‘for private circulation’ from the ‘Journal of Sacred Literature’ for July 1862. These papers, with a third, on the ‘Art History of the Tree of Life,’ originally read, 11 May 1859, before the Royal Society of Literature, were collected in a volume entitled ‘Essays on Symbolism,’ and published in 1866.

He was a prolific contributor to the Athenæum, to which he communicated around 50 articles on topics related to Dante and Italy.’ He was a constant correspondent of the Morning Post, to which, besides articles referring to Dante, he addressed over forty ‘Letters on the National Gallery,’ 1849–67, as well as ‘Letters on the British Museum’ and ‘Letters on the Crystal Palace at Sydenham.’ His writings as poet, critic, and student are numerous. He was the author of an inaugural ‘Dissertation on the Causes and Effects of Disease, considered in reference to the Moral Constitution of Man’ (Edinburgh, 1837); and he left several treatises in manuscript, one of which, the ‘Harmony of Creation and Redemption,’ 4 vols., was placed thirteenth amongst the candidates for the Burnet Theological Prize awarded at Aberdeen in 1854.

== Legacy ==
Barlow left by will £1,000 to University College, London, for the endowment of an annual course of lectures on the Divina Commedia, as well as the books and prints, in his library which related to Dante and Italian history and literature. He also left £500l to the Geological Society.

== Collections ==
University College London holds two collections relating to Barlow: the Dante collection was founded on his bequest of books in 1876, and the related documents form the Barlow Papers.
