= Chloe Barlow =

American novelist

Chloe T. Barlow is a contemporary romance novelist. She has authored two full-length novels and one short story. Her debut novel, Three Rivers, was featured in the September 7, 2014, edition of the Pittsburgh Post-Gazette. Her second novel, City of Champions, was featured in the January 27, 2015, edition of the Pittsburgh Post-Gazette. Chloe has also been featured in the Mt. Lebanon Magazine.

Barlow's short story, "Shanghai Wind," was featured in an anthology of eighteen previously unpublished short stories by multiple best selling authors titled Pink Shades of Words, which was created to raise money for the Avon Walk, which supports the fight against breast cancer.

On July 17, 2015, the Pittsburgh Tribune-Review published an interview with Barlow wherein she listed her five favorite date spots in Pittsburgh. On July 21, 2015, lupus.org featured Barlow in an article describing how writing helps Barlow cope with Lupus.
