= William Barlow =

William, Bill, or Billy Barlow may refer to:

== Religion ==
- William Barlow (bishop of Chichester) (c. 1498–1568), English cleric
- William Barlow (bishop of Lincoln) (died 1613), English Anglican priest and courtier
- William Barlow (archdeacon of Salisbury) (died 1625), Welsh churchman and writer on magnetism
- William Rudesind Barlow (1585–1656), English Benedictine monk
- William Barlow (dean of Peterborough) (1833–1908), Anglican priest

== Others ==
- William Henry Barlow (1812–1902), English civil engineer
- William Barlow (pioneer) (1822–1904), American pioneer in Oregon
- William Barlow (vice-chancellor) (1834–1915), Irish-Australian lawyer and academic
- William Barlow (geologist) (1845–1934), English geologist
- Billy Barlow (1870–1963), Canadian ice hockey player
- Bill Barlow (1931–2020), Canadian politician in Ontario
- William K. Barlow (1936–2022), American politician in Virginia

== Other uses ==
- William Barlow House, American historic building in Clackamas County, Oregon
- William V. N. Barlow House, American historic building in Albion, New York
