= Frank Barlow =

Frank Barlow may refer to:

- Frank Barlow (footballer) (born 1946), British football coach and manager
- Frank Barlow (historian) (1911–2009), British historian known for his biographies of medieval figures
- Frank Barlow (Coronation Street), fictional character in the British soap opera Coronation Street
- Frank D. Barlow (1891–1982), member of the Mississippi Senate
- Frank Barlow (1930–2019), British media mogul

== See also ==
- Francis Barlow (disambiguation)
