= Lillian Barlow =

American woodworker

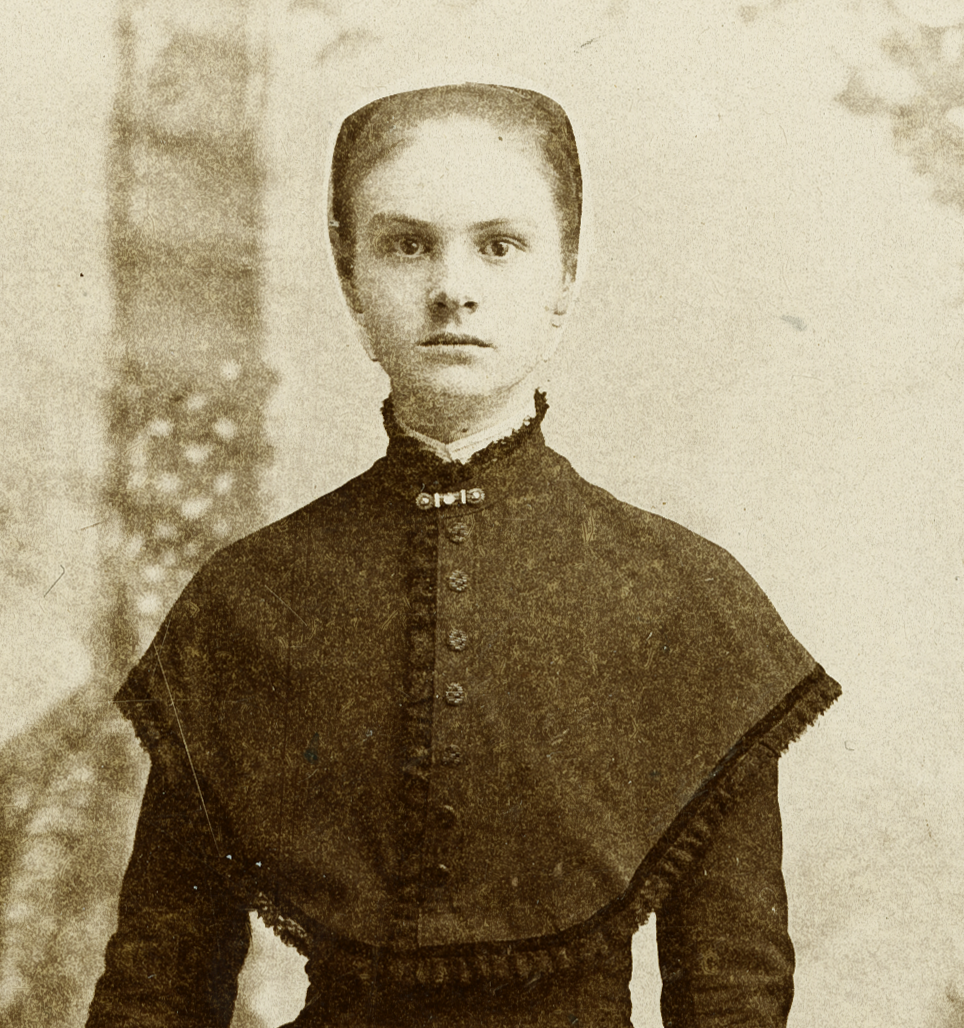
- Born: May 11, 1876; Greenville, Mississippi, U.S.
- Died: February 7, 1942 (aged 65); New Lebanon, New York
- Occupations: Woodworker, community leader
- Organization: Shaker community

Lillian Ida Barlow (May 11, 1876 – February 7, 1942) was an American crafter and community leader. For many years, she ran the woodworking shop at the Mount Lebanon Shaker Village in New York State. She is considered "the last Shaker chair maker".

== Early life and education ==
Barlow was born in 1876, in Greenville, Mississippi. By age 10, she was an orphan and living in New York state.

== Career ==
Barlow joined the Shaker community at Mount Lebanon, New York in 1886, when she was ten years old. In 1909 her relationship with her co-worker Ernest Pick raised concerns, and "she did admit that possibly she had shown more friendship for Elder Pick than she should have done." Pick was dismissed as an elder by Bishop M. Catherine Allen, and left the community for about ten years.

Barlow ran or co-ran the community's woodshop for many years, and made it a success, especially producing chairs for sale. She was also involved in a short-lived venture with Burpee to market Shaker-grown vegetables as canned goods. Barlow was the last Shaker to make chairs at Mount Lebanon, before the Shaker community sold its property there in 1940.

== Death and legacy ==
Barlow died in 1942, at age 63, in New Lebanon, New York. Chairs attributed to Barlow's craftsmanship are still valued by collectors, and several of her projects and work items are in the collection of the Shaker Museum. There are letters written by Lillian Barlow in the Winterthur Library. In 2023 she was one focus of a Women's History Month event in Spencertown, New York.
