= Peter Barlow =

Peter Barlow may refer to:

- Peter Barlow (mathematician) (1776–1862), English writer on pure and applied mathematics
- Peter W. Barlow (1809–1885), English civil engineer and son of the mathematician
- Peter W. Barlow (author) (1847–1890), engineer and author, son of Peter W. Barlow (English civil engineer)
- Peter Barlow (Coronation Street), a fictional character in the UK television soap opera Coronation Street
- Peter Barlow (footballer) (born 1950), former forward in the Football League
- Peter Townsend Barlow (1857–1921), American jurist in New York City
