= George Barlow (soccer) =

Australian soccer player (1933–2021)

Personal information
- Full name: George William Barlow
- Date of birth: 7 February 1933
- Place of birth: Stoke-on-Trent, England
- Date of death: 7 May 2021 (aged 88)
- Positions: Centre half; inside right

Senior career*
Years	Team	Apps	(Gls)
1952–1959	Balgownie Rangers FC		

International career^{‡}
1958	Australia	1	(0)
- * Club domestic league appearances and goals as of 07 February 2015 ‡ National team caps and goals as of 07 February 2015

George William Barlow (7 February 1933 – 7 May 2021) was an Australian footballer.

== Club career ==
George Barlow spent his adult career (1952-1959) playing for Balgownie Rangers FC. This included the period of 1957-1959 during which he captained the side. Barlow led the side to victory in the 1957 Sydney Cup (State League Div 1 championships). He represented NSW (against Blackpool in their 1958 tour) and was selected for the national side once. Barlow began his career as a junior with Port Vale FC.

Barlow initially played as an inside right but transitioned into a centre half later in his career. He retired in 1959 after an ankle injury.

== Personal life and death ==
Barlow was born in Stoke-on-Trent, England on 7 February 1933. He died on 7 May 2021, at the age of 88.

== Honours ==
=== Club ===
Balgownie Rangers FC

- NSW State League Div 1: 1952-1959
