= Scott Barlow =

Scott Barlow may refer to:

- Scott Barlow (baseball) (born 1992), American baseball pitcher
- Scott Barlow (businessman) (born 1976), Australian businessman

== See also ==
- Scott Barrow (disambiguation)
