= James E. Barlow =

James E. Barlow (October 14, 1881 – October 4, 1958) was an American civil engineer and city manager.

== Education and civil engineering ==
Barlow was born in 1881 in Somerville, Massachusetts. He graduated from Phillips Andover Academy the Massachusetts Institute of Technology in 1905 and taught at the university for a year and at Brooklyn Polytechnic for three. Trained as a civil engineer, Barlow worked on the construction of the Catskill Aqueduct in upstate New York. He later worked on the original Charles River Dam in Massachusetts.

== City Manager ==
In 1914, Barlow was the first city manager of Dayton, Ohio, which was the first major city to adopt the system. In 1921, he became the first city manager of New London, Connecticut. In 1928, Barlow replaced Harry Brinkerhoff as Portland, Maine's second city manager. As city manager of Portland during the Great Depression, Barlow was known for opposing tax increases intended to provide jobs to unemployed residents.

== Anti-union activities ==
Barlow was known for his opposition to organized labor. Following the passage of the federal Taft–Hartley Act of 1947, Barlow became the foremost proponent of enacting a right-to-work law in Maine. The "Barlow bill" was defeated in a statewide vote on September 13, 1947.
