= Thomas Worthington Barlow =

Thomas Worthington Barlow (1823? – 10 August 1856), was an English antiquary and naturalist.

== Life ==
Barlow was the only son of William Worthington Barlow of Cranage, Cheshire. Educated for the legal profession, he became a member of Gray's Inn in May 1843, and was called to the bar 14 June 1848. The April before he had been elected a fellow of the Linnean Society, and was also an early member of the Wernerian Club. He afterwards lived at Manchester, where he practised as a special pleader and conveyancer. In 1853 he started an antiquarian miscellany called the Cheshire and Lancashire Historical Collector, the last number of which appeared in August 1855.

He had previously published Cheshire, its Historical and Literary Associations (1852, enlarged edition 1855), and seventy copies of a Sketch of the History of the Church at Holmes Chapel, Cheshire (1853). In April 1856 he accepted the appointment of Queen's Advocate for Sierra Leone; but within less than four months after his arrival in the colony he fell a victim to the fatal climate, dying at Freetown on 10 August, aged 33. In addition to the works mentioned above, Barlow was the author of: A Chart of British Ornithology(1847), The Field Naturalist's Note Book (1848), The Mystic Number: a Glance at the System of Nature (1852), and Memoir of W. Broome, with Selections from his Works (1855).
