= James A. Barlow =

American politician (1923–2015)

Member of the Wyoming House of Representatives
- In office 1983–1987

Mayor of Casper, Wyoming
- In office 1966–1968

Personal details
- Born: James A. Barlow Jr. September 4, 1923 Englewood, New Jersey, U.S.
- Died: January 2, 2015 (aged 91) Jackson Hole, Wyoming, U.S.
- Party: Republican
- Education: Middlebury College; University of Wyoming
- Profession: Politician, geologist

Military service
- Allegiance: United States
- Branch/service: United States Army
- Battles/wars: World War II

James A. Barlow Jr. (September 4, 1923 – January 2, 2015) was an American geologist and politician.

Born in Englewood, New Jersey, he served in the United States Navy during World War II. He received his bachelor's degree from Middlebury College and his master's and doctorate degrees from University of Wyoming. He worked for several oil companies and then had his own business. From 1960 to 1966, Barlow served on the Casper, Wyoming city council and then was the mayor from 1966 to 1968. From 1983 to 1987, Barlow served in the Wyoming House of Representatives as a Republican. He died in Jackson Hole, Wyoming.
