= John Henry Barlow =

English novelist and critic

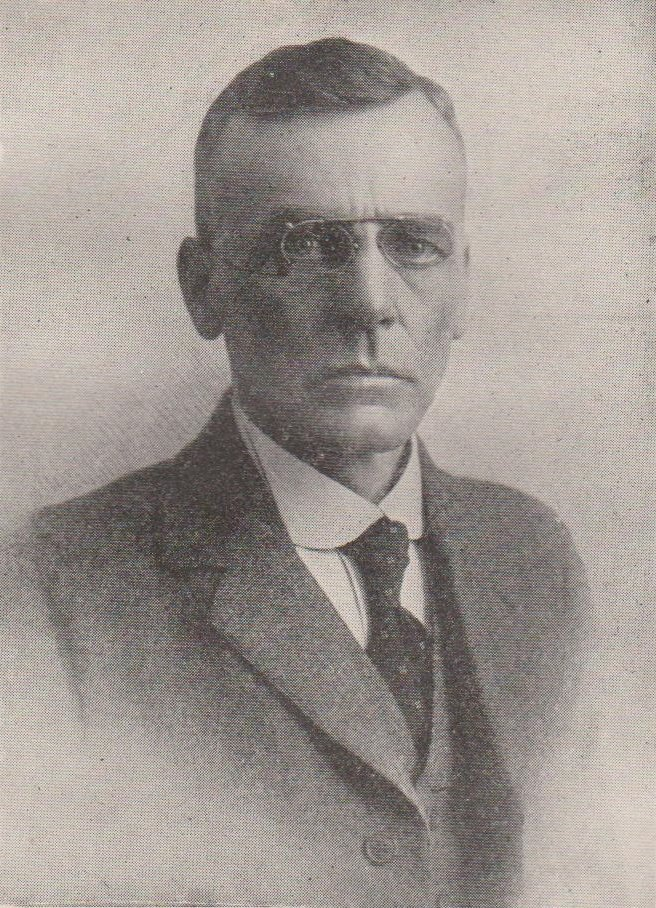
- Born: 3 October 1855; Edinburgh, Scotland
- Died: 8 August 1924 (aged 68); Selly Oak, Birmingham, England
- Known for: Peace activism
- Spouse: Mabel Barlow
- Children: four
- Parent(s): John Barlow, Eliza Barlow

John Henry Barlow (3 October 1855 – 8 August 1924), widely called "the outstanding Quaker statesman of his generation", was an ambassador for peace in the war years and clerk of London Yearly Meeting for seven years. He was the person who most held the Society together at a taxing moment in its history. He was one of the first members of the Friends' Ambulance Unit. Later he served 23 years as the first secretary and general manager of the Bournville Village Trust. In 1920 he led a delegation to Ireland to look into the Black and Tans atrocities.

== Family ==
Descended from two old Quaker families, John Henry Barlow was born in Edinburgh in 1855 the son of John Barlow of the Royal (Dick) School of Veterinary Studies, Edinburgh University and his wife Eliza Nicholson. His father, one of the respected scientists of his generation, died at the age of 40 in 1856, when Barlow was hardly a year old. The money left to provide for his wife and family was mostly lost due to an almost simultaneous collapse of the City of Glasgow Bank and a Cornish tin mine in which he had invested. He was brought up by his mother with the assistance of Quaker cousins, first in Edinburgh then in Carlisle, where she moved to be with her sister Mary, who had married Jonathan Carr, founder of Carr's Biscuits.

Barlow went to the Quaker Stramongate School in Kendal but was prevented by his family's finances from going to university and studying medicine as his father had done. He joined The Clydesdale Bank, where he earned enough for the family to move in 1881 to Murrell Hill Cottage in Carlisle, where Eliza Barlow remained until she died in 1894.

Barlow was increasingly involved in charitable work, giving talks to the Temperance League with his cousins Bertram and Theodore Carr. He funded notable work for poor communities in the city such as Willow Holme. In 1889 he left the Bank for Carr's, where he met as manager another Quaker, Ernest Hutchinson. Ernest had recently married Louie Cash and before long John Henry met her sister Mabel Cash, whom he married in 1895.

The couple decided to revive the charitable work that the Carrs' eldest son, Henry, had begun. As Mabel Barlow wrote in a memoir of her husband for their children in 1927, Willow Holme "was a dark and dangerous neighbourhood... with drunken brawls and horrible fights between women as well as men; terrified shrieks issued as wife or child was being ill-treated...." Other Quakers who helped including their cousin, Richard Cadbury of the chocolate firm and it was here that many young people received their first lessons in reading and writing. There was also a club room for boys, where Barlow went regularly to read stories and organise games.

Richard and his brother George Cadbury, in view of the work Barlow was doing in Carlisle, invited him in 1900 to become the first manager of the newly formed Bournville Village Trust (BVT), an experiment in housing the poor from the city of Birmingham and those working for Cadbury's. He remained in Birmingham until he died in 1924, when his task was carried on by his youngest son, F. Ralph Barlow.

The Barlow family, including John Henry, was related to the Cadburys, Frys and Lloyds. All of these famous chocolatier-bankers were also Quakers.

== Birmingham and Bournville ==
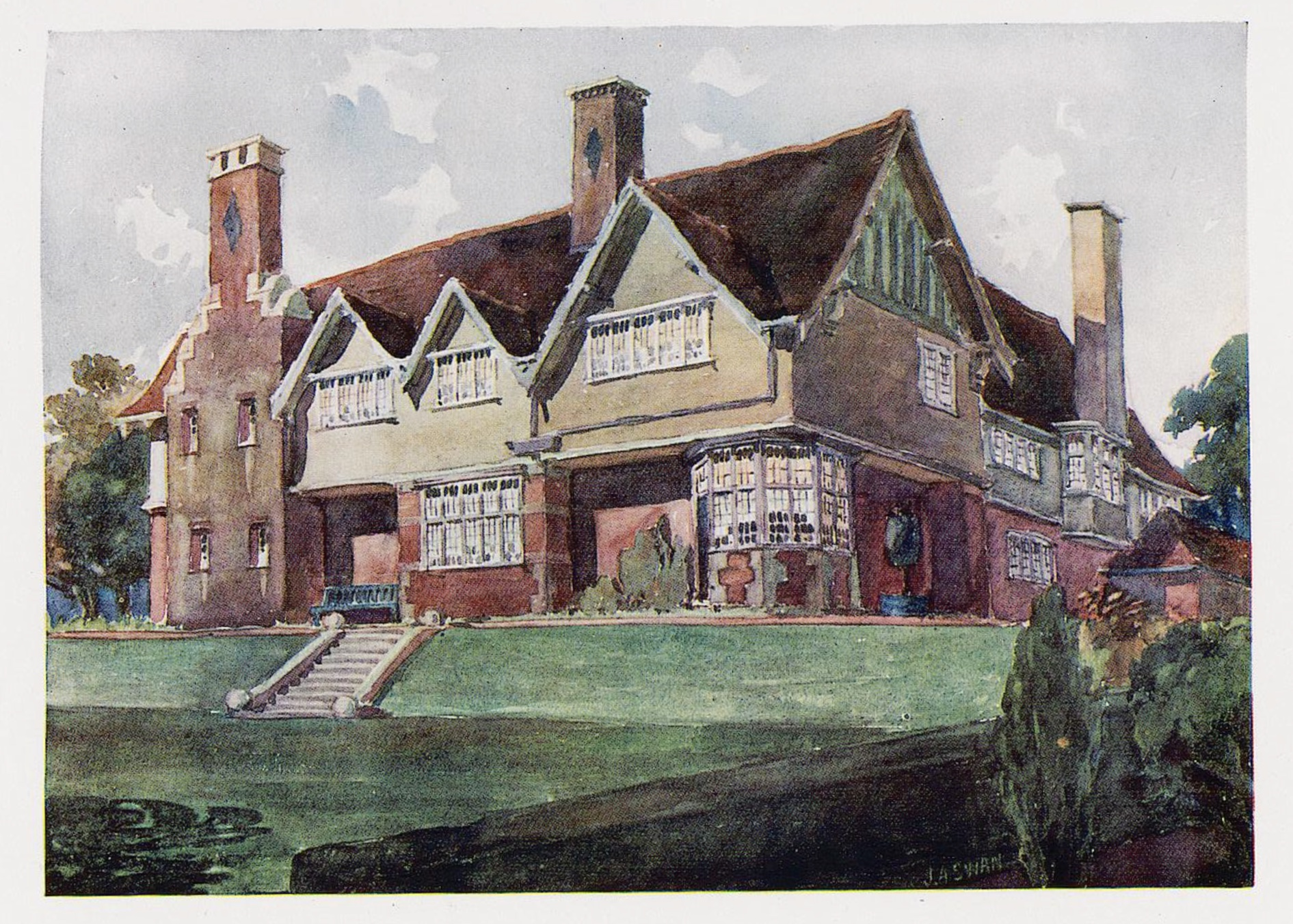
Sunnybrae by the architect William Alexander Harvey

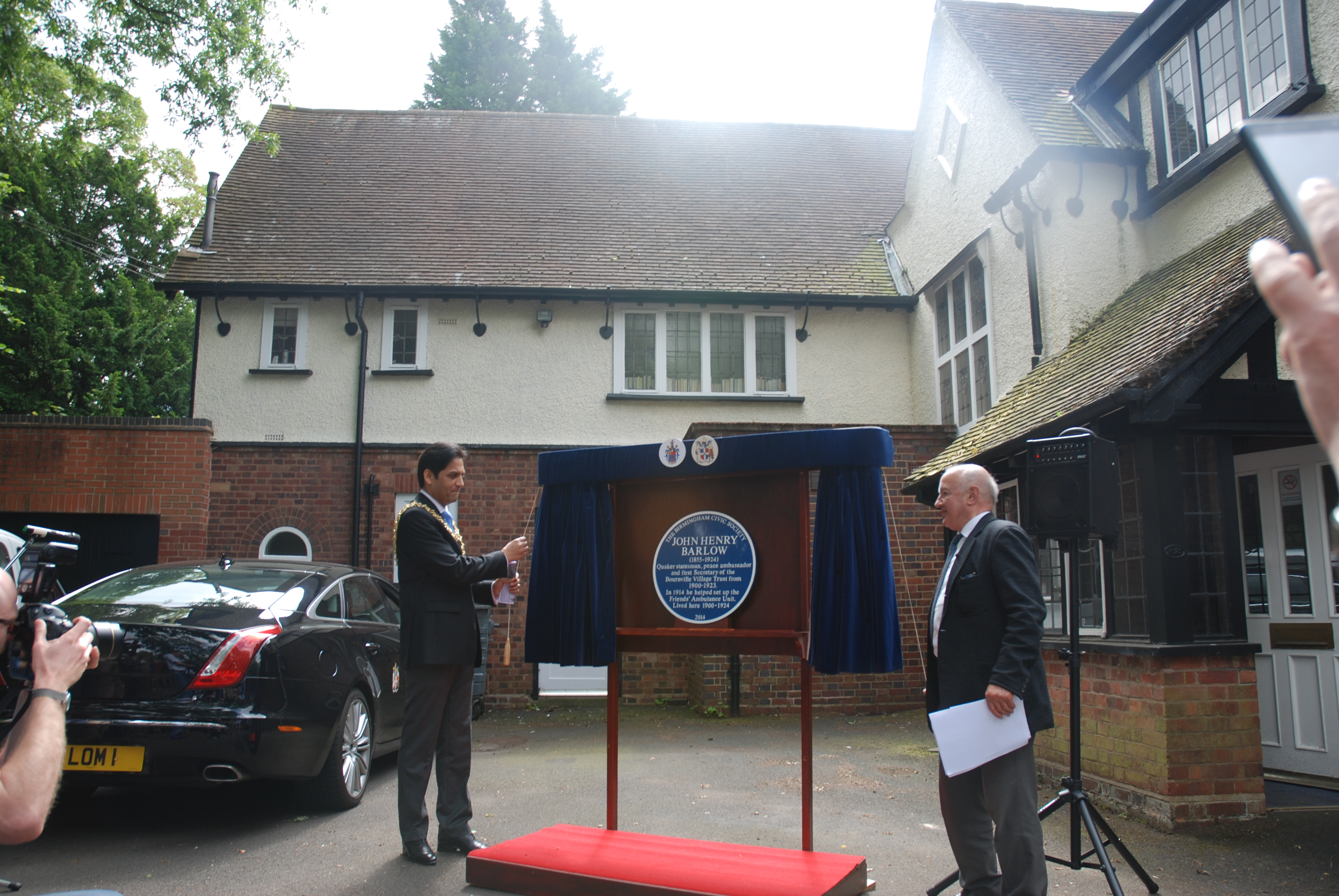
John Henry's grandson, Antony Barlow unveils a plaque at his grandfather's former home Sunnybrae.

John Henry Barlow and his wife lived in Birmingham first at Woodbrooke, still a Cadbury home before it became a Quaker college in 1903. Later they moved to Sunnybrae, near the Bournville Estate, which was provided by George Cadbury. He studied housing developments in Europe and became an authority on community housing, while chairing committees for David Lloyd George and influencing people such as Henrietta Barnett, founder of Hampstead Garden Suburb.

On Barlow's retirement in 1923, Aldridge wrote as Chairman of the National Housing Council: "Your work has been of vital concern to the housing movement. In fact, what this would have been without the example of Bournville help I can hardly conceive." Elizabeth Cadbury, then Chairman of the BVT, wrote, "The Trustees of the Bournville Village Trust, on the retirement of John Henry Barlow, wish to record their high appreciation of his devoted service help. For over twenty-two years he has directed the administration and development of the Estate. They know that the work which he has so lovingly performed has not only served the community which has immediately benefited from it, but will live as an example for all who follow this pioneer movement for housing reform. In addition, his public work in other spheres, has won him the honour and respect of all with whom he has come in contact."

== Quaker peace work ==
In 1915 Barlow was chosen to lead a delegation to the Netherlands to try to bring non-aligned countries together to find a basis for peace negotiations. He was Clerk of the Quaker Yearly Meeting from 1913. In 1920 he was chosen to head up a Quaker delegation to Ireland (see below) to appraise the situation during the atrocities committed by the Black and Tans. In 1922 he was chosen as the British representative to the Five-Year Quaker Meeting in Richmond, Indiana.

The UK Defence of the Realm Act 1914 (DORA) gave the government wide-ranging powers in the war period, for instance to requisition buildings or land for the war effort or make regulations creating criminal offences. In particular it ushered in a variety of authoritarian social-control mechanisms, such as censorship. When the act was brought in, Friends' Service Committee, of which Barlow was a prominent member, recommended that conscientious objectors append the following to National Registration documents: "Whilst registering as a citizen in conformity with the demand of the Government, I cannot conscientiously take part in military service, in any employment necessitating the taking of a military oath, nor in the production of materials, the object of which is the taking of human life."

Regulation 27C ordered that no pamphlet or similar publication dealing with the war or the making of peace be issued without being first passed by the Censor. It was decided by Meeting for Sufferings that to submit to this would be to give up the case for liberty of speech. The minute drafted by Barlow stated, "The Executive Body of the Society of Friends, after serious consideration, desires to place on record its conviction that the portion of the recent regulations requiring the submission to the Censor of all leaflets dealing with the present war and the making of peace is a grave danger to the national welfare. The duty of every good citizen to express his thoughts on the affairs of his country is hereby endangered, and further we believe that Christianity requires the toleration of opinions not our own. Beyond this there is a deeper issue involved. It is for Christians a paramount duty to be free to obey, and to act and speak in accord with the law of God, a law higher than that of any State and no government can release men from this duty. We realize the rarity of the occasions on which a body of citizens find their sense of duty to be in conflict with the law and it is with a sense of gravity of the decision that The Society of Friends must on this occasion act contrary to the regulation and continue to issue literature on war and peace without submitting it to the censor and is thus acting in the best interests of the nation."

Quakers continued to issue pamphlets such as "A Challenge to Militarism", with information on those imprisoned for their beliefs and for opposition to the war through such leafleting. In particular, two ladies were arrested but released with their summonses deferred until proceedings could be taken against the authors. This resulted from the Friends' Service Committee acting on behalf of Yearly Meeting. Other Committee members were already in custody.

== Guildhall Court ==
The court was convened on 24 May, while the Yearly Meeting was in session, with John Henry Barlow as presiding Clerk reading the minute as quoted above. When the Aldermen retired to consider the verdict, John Henry's clear and commanding voice was heard asking for Friends in court "to devote themselves to silent prayer."

The occasion was recorded in the New York Evening Post: "At the Guildhall Court, one of two police courts of the City of London, at which the presiding judge is always one of the city aldermen... the defendants in the case were prominent Quakers, and the body of the court contained a large number of Quakers. Then the magistrate retired to consider his decision and the Clerk, of the Yearly Meeting, John Henry Barlow, rose and invited Friends who were present to engage in silent prayer. For a time, the court then became a Quaker meeting, during which the silence was occasionally broken by a few words of vocal prayer. As one of the reporters present remarked: 'It was like a throw back to the 17th century.' The incident was not only curious in itself, but is likely to be historic. Future historians may record it as a landmark in the relation of the British churches to the State. It is probably the first occasion since the Stuart period on which an organized religious body has deliberately challenged the State's authority."

As the war continued, censorship became stricter and freedom of speech almost non-existent. The outspoken document issued by Yearly Meeting of Friends in 1916, dealing with the matter of conscription, seemed likely to infringe the law. Such a statement opposing the Defence of the Realm Act and conscription was widely considered dangerous by Friends. In particular they questioned whether it was fair to allow John Henry Barlow as Clerk, to sign the document himself on behalf of Friends, thus risking his own imprisonment. "At which point John Barlow rose and with his characteristic gesture of drawing himself up and throwing back his shoulders, his voice rang out across that crowded hall – 'Surely at such a time, no one is playing for safety.... [Neither] the Society nor am I concerned with what is safe, but what is true and right and I propose to sign the document.' He signed and read the whole document out aloud ending with the words, 'signed John H Barlow, Clerk'."

In 1916 the Government introduced the Military Service Act, by which all British males between aged 18–41 could be conscripted. Since 1757, Quakers had been exempted from the militia, and although the 1916 Act was unique in providing for exemption on conscientious grounds, the wording was unfortunately undefined and it was dealt with on a case-by-case basis. Many who sought exemption were Quakers accepting the Quaker rejection of war. Some other Christian denominations and political movements also rejected the ultimate control of the state over life and limb. They agreed that participation in war was a matter for individual conscience which overrode legal and social pressures. With the advent of war, many of the Friends' War Victims Relief Committee of 1870 came together in the No-Conscription Fellowship, formed in 1914 by Barlow. He also joined Philip Noel-Baker in the fledgling Friends' Ambulance Unit, which started in 1914 as the Anglo-Belgian Ambulance Unit. Training took place at the old Quaker centre at Jordans in Buckinghamshire. It was dissolved in 1919 only to be resurrected in 1939 at the outbreak of the Second World War, when Barlow's son Ralph Barlow was a leading light.

== Post-war ==
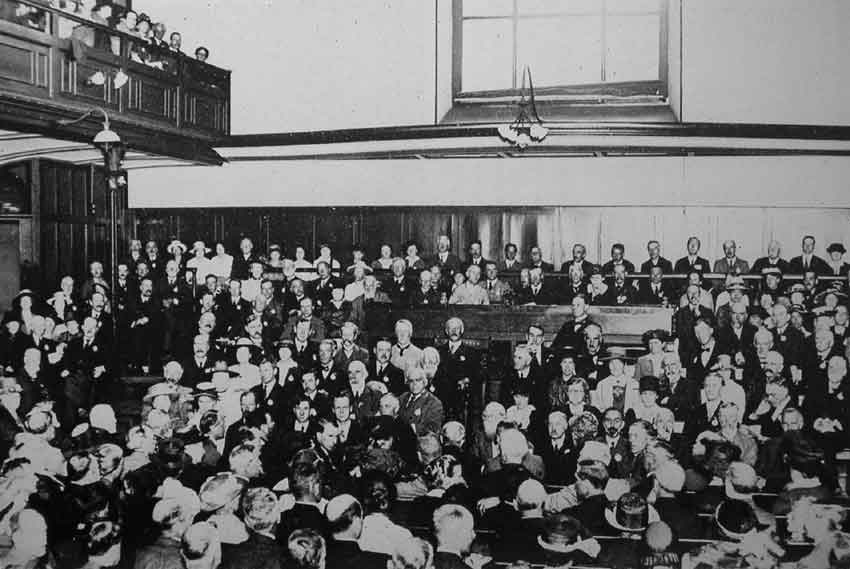
The All Friends Conference, London, 1920 first of the world conferences of the Society. Held in Devonshire House, London and clerked by John Henry

The report of Barlow's 1920 deputation to Ireland with two other leading Quakers, Roger Clark, of Clarks Shoes and Edith M. Ellis, twin sister of Marian Crips, appeared in The Times on 5 October 1920 as a "model of judicial restraint and the more damning for it". The report was also read on 16 December 1920 among evidence presented to the American Commission on Conditions in Ireland.

Barlow suffered a fatal heart attack in August 1924. There was strong press appreciation. The general Quaker feeling was summed up in The American Friend, "The Passing of a Statesman": "It was not alone the timbre of his voice that keeps it so fresh in the memory; it was also the character behind the voice and the force of the message it conveyed. In a life tireless of industry and distinguished service, John Henry Barlow was a living expression of Quakerism at its highest and best – he was both a preacher and a doer of the word; and eloquent as was his preaching, it was not more so than the steadfast devotion and the fine capacity with which he served his fellow men."

John Henry and Mabel Barlow had four children.

== Sources ==
- Minutes of Britain Yearly Meeting, held at The Library of the Society of Friends, London.
- An Account of the Life of John Henry Barlow by Mabel C Barlow 1927
- Letters in The Imperial War Museum
