= Kevin O'Neill (soccer) =

Australian soccer player (born 1925)

Kevin O'Neill OAM
Personal information
- Date of birth: 14 November 1925 (age 100)
- Place of birth: Cessnock, New South Wales
- Position: Utility player

Senior career*
| Years | Team | Apps | (Gls) |
| 1943 | Kurri Kurri | | |
| 1944 | West Wallsend | | |
| 1945–1958 | Cessnock | | |
| 1959–1960 | Prague | | |
| 1961–1963 | Lake Macquarie | | |

International career
| 1950–1958 | Australia | 12 | (0) |
- * Club domestic league appearances and goals

Kevin O'Neill (born 14 November 1925) is an Australian soccer player who played the majority of his career for Cessnock at club level and for Australia in international football. He is believed to be the world's oldest-living soccer player.

In 2000, O'Neill was inducted into the Soccer Australia Hall of Fame. In May 2021, at the age of 95, O'Neill was noted for being the oldest living former player of the Australia national football team. On his 100th birthday in 2025 he was presented with a Socceroos shirt numbered 100 by current Socceroo Mark Milligan. He was awarded the Medal of the Order of Australia in the 2024 King's Birthday Honours.
