= John Barlow (veterinary surgeon) =

British veterinarian

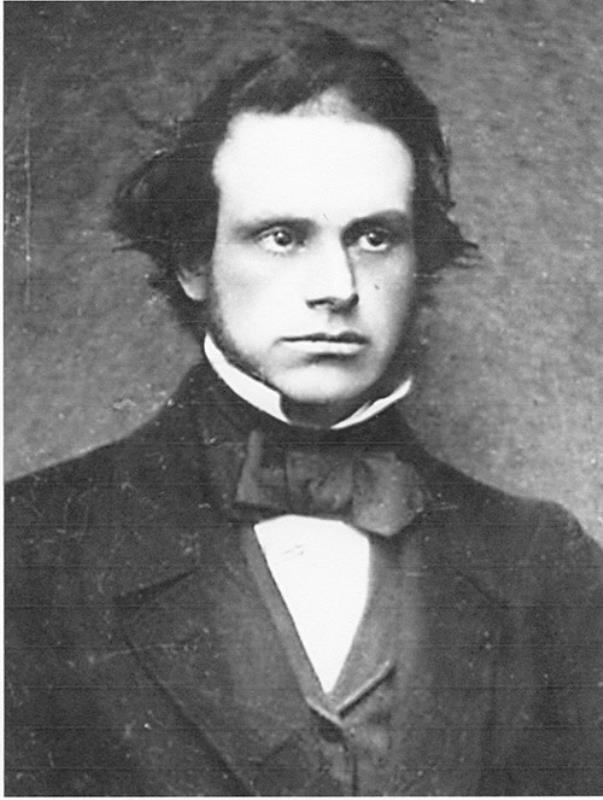
- Born: 20 September 1815; The Oaks, Chorley, Cheshire
- Died: 29 January 1856 (aged 40); Pilrig Street, Edinburgh
- Occupation: Veterinary surgeon
- Spouse: Eliza Nicholson
- Children: Alfred, Mary, John Henry

John Barlow (1815–1856) is best known as a pioneer of veterinary studies and professor at Royal (Dick) School of Veterinary Studies, Edinburgh, Scotland. He is credited with being the first to introduce the microscope to the school and his many scientific papers which appeared in such publications as The North British Agriculturalist were and remain to this day the basis of much modern research. He came from an old Quaker family in Cheshire, England.

== Early life ==
John Barlow was born on 20 September 1815 in Chorley near Alderley Edge in the old picturesque house known as The Oaks, which had been in the family for some 200 years. He was the oldest of seven children, three sons and four daughters, to another John Barlow (1789–1846) and his wife Deborah Neild (1790–1850). His father was a farmer and it was always assumed that as he grew up he too would help on the farm, but his love of the animals led him another direction.

== Education ==
He went first to the Quaker school Ackworth in South Yorkshire for four years, before for a while helping on the farm, where he became fascinated by the illnesses the animals were prone to. This interest eventually took him to Edinburgh in 1842 where he enrolled at Royal (Dick) School of Veterinary Studies in Clyde Street. In 1844 he gained his diploma and was awarded various medals including the silver medal for the best paper submitted on ‘puerperal fever’ in cows.

== Career ==
He moved to Edinburgh and William Dick, founder and head of the veterinary college, realising his potential, took him on as assistant professor of anatomy and physiology and in 1855 as full professor. He was the first to introduce the microscope to the scientific studies at the school and his many scientific papers which appeared in such publications as The North British Agriculturalist were and remain to this day the basis of much modern research. He was a close friend of Joseph Lister and John Bright whom he was with at Ackworth.

Professor William Williams, the founder and Principal of the New Veterinary College in Edinburgh said some years after Barlow's death, that "Professor Barlow was a pioneer of Veterinary Science, a man living one hundred years before his time. The others were rule of thumb practitioners, while he brought the light of science to bear upon the profession." His contemporary James Simpson, the pioneer of chloroform, described him as "a man destined to advance and elevate veterinary science"; Professor William Gairdner, Glasgow's first Medical Officer, called him "a great original thinker, so truthful and so unselfish". His colleague Professor John Goodsir said Professor Barlow's achievements "were the result of a very remarkable ability."

== Personal life ==
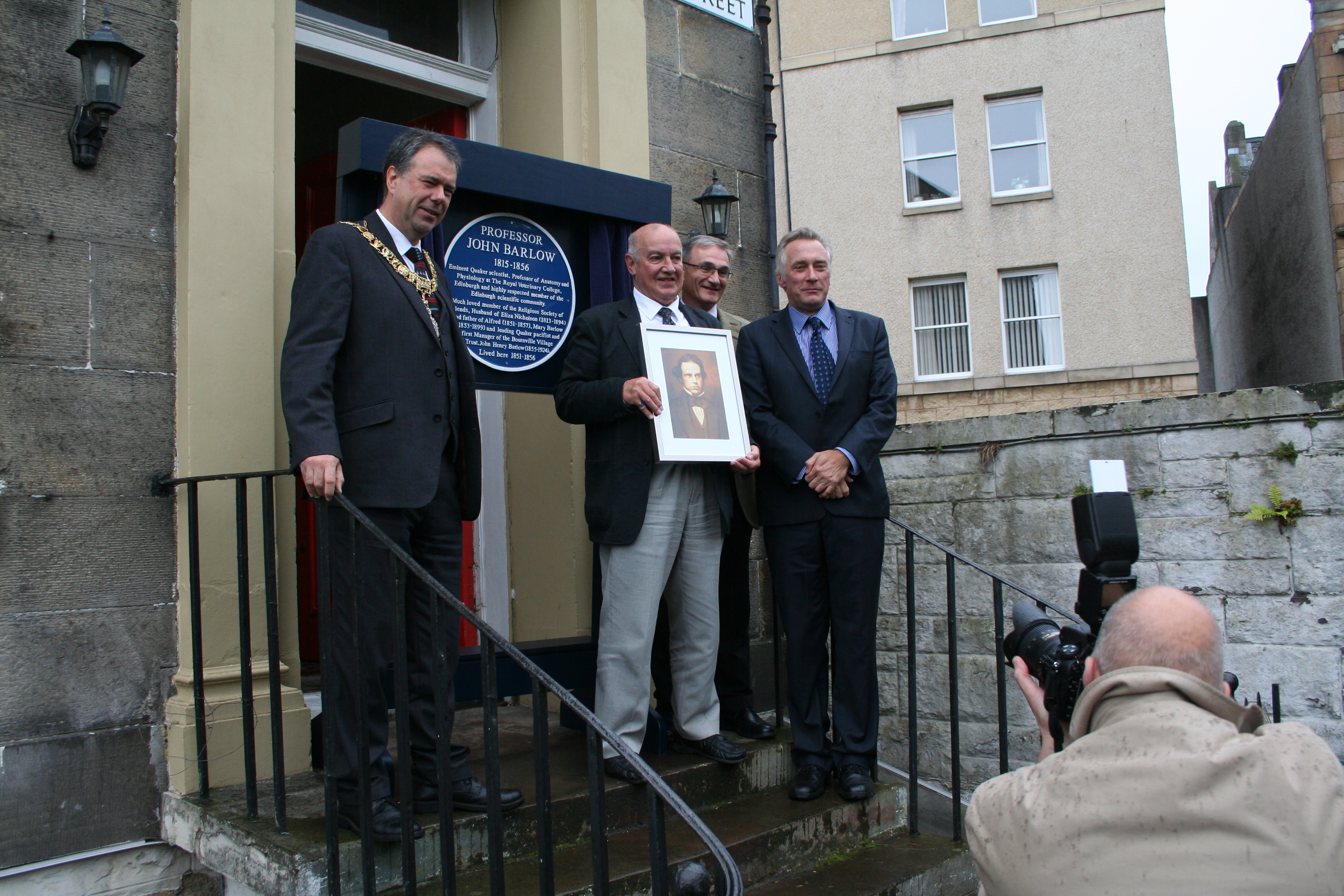
The unveiling of a Blue Plaque in 2015 in memory of John Barlow on his former home at 1 Pilrig Street, Edinburgh, in the presence of - from left to right - the Lord Provost, The Rt Hon Donald Wilson, John Barlow's two great-grandchildren, Antony and Nicholas Barlow, Professor Brendan Corcoran from the Royal (Dick) School of Veterinary Studies, University of Edinburgh

In 1851 he met Eliza Nicholson (1813–1894) of Whitehaven whom he married on New Year's Day that year and they moved into No. 1 Pilrig Street. They had three children, Alfred (1851–7), Mary (1853–1899) and John Henry (1855–1924). He contracted meningitis and died from acute spinal infection at the age of 40 on 29 January 1856.

Eliza was left quite well off. However within a very short time much of the money was eroded away, due to the collapse of both the Clydesdale Bank and the Cornish tin mines. The family initially lived with Quaker cousins, the Wigham's in Edinburgh but later moved to Carlisle where their cousins Jonathan and Jane Carr of Carr's Biscuits brought them up. John Henry grew up and made his early life there until he moved to Birmingham in 1900 to join George Cadbury at Bournville.

Professor Barlow was also a highly esteemed member of the Edinburgh Quaker community and the house where the family lived at Pilrig Street, Edinburgh is still there. A plaque has now been erected at the house.

== Quaker life ==
All his life, John Barlow followed the doctrines of the Society of Friends (Quakers) whose Christian beliefs shaped his gentle, modest, unassuming character. The Edinburgh Friends were a group of strong Liberals in politics and amongst Barlow's close circle was Joseph Lister, later Lord Lister, the pioneer in antiseptic surgery.

Like most Quakers of the period John Barlow married within the faith. His wife, Eliza Nicholson of Whitehaven, was herself a descendant of James Lancaster, one of the first followers of George Fox, the founder of Quakerism.

Of their three children, John Henry Barlow, went on to be one of the Society's most prominent elder statesmen in World War I, leading the pacifist cause and securing the right to abstain on grounds of conscience and helping to start The Friends Ambulance Unit. He was also the founder of George Cadbury's pioneer housing experiment, The Bournville Village Trust in Birmingham.

== Bibliography ==
- Barlow, J. (1846), 'On the Breech Presentation of the Foetus', The Veterinarian, vol 19, (Sep) pp. 500–501
- Barlow, J. (1848), 'Shoulder Lameness', The Veterinarian, vol 21, (Sep) pp. 507–509 [Clinical point made about Percivall's paper on pp. 357–365, Jul 1848]
- Barlow, J. (1854), 'Cases of Cancer in Horses', The Veterinarian, vol 27, (Aug) pp. 429–434. [In which he mentions his friend W. T. Gairdner 'the eminent pathologist'].
- Barlow, J. (1854), ‘Cases of Irregular Strangles’ The Veterinarian, vol 27, (Sep) pp. 490–497. [In which he mentions his friend Mr. Hallen, V.S., now at Cavalry Depot, Canterbury]
- Barlow, J. (1854), ‘Acute Laminitis with Enteritis and Pneumonia’ The Veterinarian, vol 27, (Nov) pp 625–629
- Barlow, J. (1855), ‘Pleurisy. Formation of Fluid in the Pleural cavities; Tapping; and Death', The Veterinarian, vol 23, (Jan) pp.4-9
- Barlow, J. (1855), ‘On the conformation of the chest in horses and cattle’ North British Agriculturist and Edinburgh Evening, Journal, No 39, Vol 7, pp. 281 (col.3)-284 (col. l)
- Barlow, J. (1856), 'Note on the occurrence of paralysis and muscular atrophy in the horse in connection with arterial obstruction and obliteration’ by the late John Barlow' Edinburgh Metlical Journal vol l, No 12 (Jun)
