= George Hilaro Barlow (physician) =

British physician

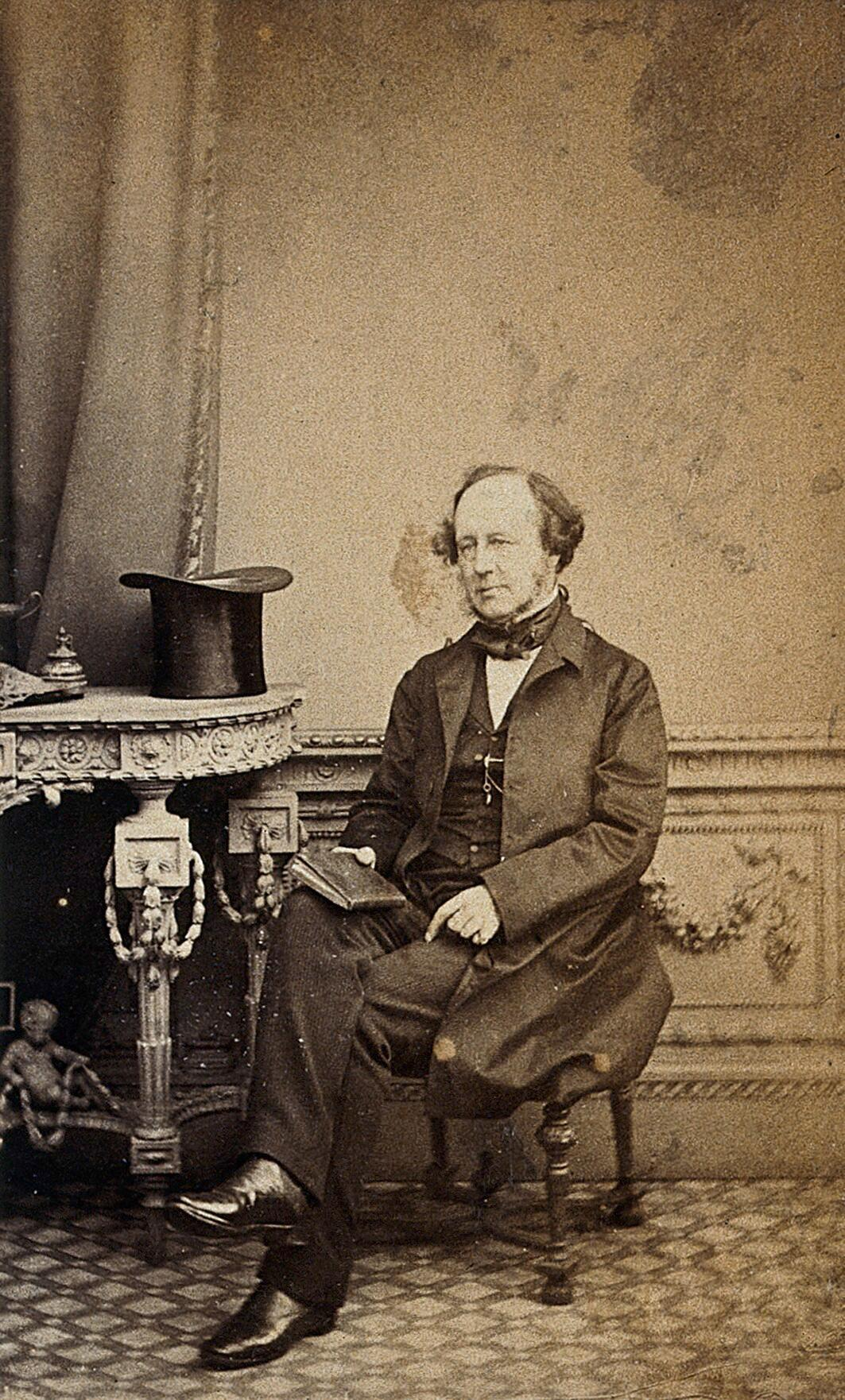
Portrait of G.H. Barlow. Credit: Wellcome Collection

George Hilaro Barlow (1806–1866) was a British physician. He was a Fellow of the Royal College of Physicians, the first editor of Guy's Hospital Reports, and the principal author of A Manual of the Practice of Medicine.

The son of a clergyman, he was named after Sir George Barlow, 1st Baronet. Disliking life in the Royal Navy, he went to Trinity College, Cambridge, where he read arts and medicine. Gaining his B.A. there in 1829, he went to Guy's the following year and furthered his formal studies in medicine.

Barlow married Lydia, daughter of Stephen Babington, in 1839. He became an assistant physician in 1840, then a full physician three years later.

At Guy's Hospital, he and George Owen Rees were supervised by Richard Bright in jointly investigating renal diseases. This team approach to a subject was regarded as pioneering. Barlow was a contemporary and colleague of both Thomas Addison, and Henry Marshall Hughes, to whom he dedicated his Manual.

He promoted, and became president of, the Clinical Reports Society. He was described as highly analytical, considering many contending possibilities for every diagnosis. He died at Sydenham.

== Works ==
- "On diseases arising from the defective expansion of the lungs in early youth" London Medical Gazette (1844) Vol. 30, pp. 705–12,785-90
- A Manual of the Practice of Medicine (1856) London:John Churchill, Philadelphia:Blanchard & Lea
