= Howard Barlow (cryptographer) =

American cryptographer

Howard C. Barlow (1918–2003) was an American cryptographer, telecommunications expert, and high-ranking civilian employee of the National Security Agency (NSA) of the United States.

Barlow, a graduate of Carnegie Institute of Technology with a B.S. in Electrical Engineering, served in the European Theatre of World War II. One of his major assignments was the Communications Planning Officer for the invasion of Normandy in 1944. While he was overseas, he designed various types of specialized communications equipment.

After the war, Barlow stayed in the cryptologic profession and joined, as a civilian, the Armed Forces Security Agency, which later became the NSA. He worked in the research and development division as one its first communications security (COMSEC) engineers. By 1954, he had risen to the level of division chief.

From 1955-1956, Barlow attended the Harvard University Middle Management Program, graduating with a master's degree in business administration.

Returning to NSA, he took a tour in operations before being named the deputy director for research and development in 1958. He held this position until 1962, when he was made assistant director for COMSEC (ADC), a position that he held until 1973. His insights and management skills created a world-class analytic and engineering organization that was able to meet the communications needs of the Vietnam War and the Cold War. His political skills enabled NSA to forge significant COMSEC relationships with U.S. Allies and become the leader for COMSEC in NATO.

Howard Barlow received many awards over his long career, including the NSA Exceptional Civilian Service Award in 1967 and, in 1973, the Department of Defense Distinguished Civilian Service Award, the highest award granted to a civilian by the DoD.

Barlow died in 2003.
