= Stan Ogden =

Fictional character from Coronation Street

- Coronation Street character
- Portrayed by: Bernard Youens
- Duration: 1964–1984
- First appearance: 29 June 1964
- Last appearance: 7 March 1984
- Introduced by: H. V. Kershaw
In-universe information
- Occupation: Window cleaner; artist; milkman; professional wrestler; coalman; ice-cream salesman; chauffeur; photographer
- Father: Isaiah Ogden
- Mother: Mary Ogden
- Wife: Hilda Crabtree (until 1984)
- Sons: Trevor Ogden; Tony Ogden
- Daughters: Irma Barlow; Sylvia Ogden
- Grandsons: Darren Barlow; Damien Ogden
- Granddaughters: Jayne Ogden
- Uncles: Edwin
- Aunts: Clara Etheridge

Stan Ogden was a fictional character from the British ITV soap opera Coronation Street, played by Bernard Youens. He debuted in the episode airing 29 June 1964 and remained a key character for twenty years until his death on 21 November 1984. Stan's character, introduced by executive producer H. V. Kershaw, has been portrayed as a well-loved layabout, and many of his storylines centred on his marriage to Hilda Ogden (Jean Alexander).

== Development ==
=== Relationship with Hilda Ogden ===
The Ogdens, Stan and his wife Hilda (Jean Alexander), have been hailed as one of Coronation Street's favourite couples with the bickering pair staying together through mishap and financial difficulty. A working-class couple, they remained a screen double act for 20 years until actor Bernard Youens died on 27 August 1984, forcing the writers of the soap to kill off Stan on-screen. A scene following Stan's screen funeral, showing Hilda weeping at the sight of his signature spectacles, has been described as "one of the most moving moments in TV history" and "instrumental in winning [Jean Alexander] the Royal Television Society's Best Performance Award for 1984–1985".

Commenting on the screen partnership, actress Jean Alexander remarked, "It was a real pleasure working with Bernard Youens, who played my screen husband, Stan. Any success I have had is really down to Bernard because we worked well as a team and each knew how the other would want to play a scene. It was a happy screen partnership but it was strictly professional. We didn't socialise after work." Alexander has stated that the Ogdens were a brilliant set-up: "They were the only couple in the street who were married – permanently. They were the only ones who owned their own house where everyone else rented, they stayed together and didn't stray or have affairs and, yes, they bickered among themselves but let anyone else criticise either of them and they would be up in arms."

Hilda and Stan Ogden were voted Britain's top romantic TV couple in 2002, in a poll of more than 5,000 people carried out by NTL:Home, beating off competition from Friends' couple Monica Geller and Chandler Bing (Courteney Cox and Matthew Perry) and Dot Cotton and Jim Branning from EastEnders (June Brown and John Bardon). In 2005 the couple topped another poll as the Ogdens were voted ITV's favourite TV characters in a survey by Broadcast magazine, which took place to coincide with the 50th anniversary of the network. They beat Minder's Arthur Daley and Prime Suspect's DCI Jane Tennison, who took second and third place respectively.

== Storylines ==
Stan and Hilda Crabtree (Jean Alexander) met in 1943, when Hilda fell over an inebriated Stan in the blackout. Six days later, they married. The morning after they married, Stan was arrested by the Military Police for overstaying his leave. Their bad luck carried on throughout their marriage.

Stan Ogden first appeared in the Street in 1964, looking for his eighteen-year-old daughter Freda (Sandra Gough), who had run away from home. Freda had changed her name to Irma and was working as Florrie Lindley's (Betty Alberge) assistant in the corner shop. Stan worked as a long-distance lorry-driver, and was away from home much of the time, leaving Hilda to look after their four children. When he was home, he was given to drinking bouts and terrible rages, which had caused their two younger children to be taken into care.

Stan managed to convince Irma that he had changed his ways, giving up lorry driving, making attempts to control his temper, and promising Irma anything if she would return to the family. At the time, No.13 Coronation Street was for sale – Jerry (Graham Haberfield) and Myra Booth (Susan Jameson) had been forced out by financial troubles – and Irma made it a condition of her return that Stan buy the house to provide the family with a permanent home. Stan surprised her by finding a deposit and buying the house for £565. In June 1964, Stan moved his family; wife Hilda, son Dudley (Jonathan Collins) (who followed his sister's lead and changed his name to Trevor) and Irma, into No. 13 Coronation Street.

Hilda quickly found work as a cleaner in the Rovers Return Inn, and Irma also worked there for a while as a barmaid. Trevor proved more troublesome, however. Age 14, he ran away with money stolen from the neighbours and wrote to his parents telling them to disown him. Stan complied with the letter and Trevor went unmentioned for years. Irma later fell for footballer David Barlow (Alan Rothwell), and the pair were married in late-1965. After that, Stan and Hilda were left on their own.

Stan had mended his ways, although he was still quite fond of his beer and quickly became Newton and Ridley's best customer. His reward: a free pint every day for life. However, this came under threat, when a mysterious illness led doctors to suspect he was allergic to alcohol. After a few days of desperation, test results proved otherwise, and Stan memorably burst into the Rover's Return, yelling "It's eggs!"

While Stan remained faithful to his local, for a few years he drifted from job to job. At various times, he was a milkman (early mornings compensated by afternoons in the pub), a coalman, an ice-cream salesman, a chauffeur, a street photographer, a professional wrestler (in his only match he was thrown from the ring into Hilda's lap) and an artist (creating sculptures from scrap metal; this backfired when his masterpiece was taken to the tip by mistake). However, in 1969, Stan bought a window cleaning round, and this would remain his primary means of support for the rest of his life.

Through many harsh years of drinking and rages, Hilda stuck by him, believing that he was her man, no matter what. They were uncommunicative to each other, and Stan left Hilda to take all responsibilities for their home, including trying to pay the bills with their limited resources. This proved too much for Hilda, and in 1967 she suffered a nervous breakdown and disappeared. She was found wandering in Liverpool a few days later, and recovered, but the lack of promise in their lives hung over them like a shadow. For Stan and Hilda, life was marginal at best. They were never more than a short step from absolute poverty.

To prove himself a dab hand at whatever he turned his hand to, Stan installed a serving hatch between the kitchen/living room and the front room, but goofed and made it big enough for a canteen. Hilda liked the hatch, but pointed out that she had little use for it, as they never used the front room anyway. He also ruined Hilda's precious Alpine "muriel" that covered one entire living room wall when he fell asleep in the bath and overflowed water seeped through the floor.

The 1970s brought the Ogdens a long streak of bad luck beginning when their grandson Darren Barlow was killed along with his father David in a car accident in Australia in 1970. Later their house had to be fumigated, Stan was suspected of being a Peeping Tom, and a chimney accident caused coal soot to ruin their furniture. Hilda blamed their bad luck on No. 13 and ordered Stan to change the house number to No. 12A. Hilda prepared a roast lamb dinner to celebrate, but when she went outside to see the new numbers inadvertently locked them both out. By the time Stan broke in, their dinner was burned. It seemed that No. 13 wasn't unlucky, Hilda and Stan were. On top of this, the council ordered them to change the number back. On 12 December 1970, Stan heard about Minnie having been taken hostage at No. 5 by Joe Donnelli (Shane Rimmer), and exchanged himself for her, unaware that Joe was armed with a gun. He was forced by Joe to sing Christmas carols to him at gunpoint until the Police arrived and Joe ended it all when he shot himself.

As the 1970s moved on, Stan aged, he grew weaker and more tired. He often didn't work, claiming his back wasn't up to the job. Hilda had to assume responsibility not only for all the household chores and looking after Stan, but also scraped to make ends meet on her wages as a charwoman. One day she had had enough, and ordered Stan out. He went, and disappeared for three weeks, much to everyone's shock. Hilda enlisted the aid of Stan's drinking buddy Eddie Yeats (Geoffrey Hughes) to find Stan. Eddie finally tracked him to Hilda's brother's chip shop, where he was helping himself to the chips and his brother-in-law's girlfriend, Edie Blundell (Avis Bunnage). Hilda dragged Stan home, and things went right back to the way they were.

Thirteen years after his disappearance, Stan and Hilda tracked Trevor down. He was married and living in a semi-detached house in Chesterfield. Stan and Hilda made a special visit, only to have his wife Polly (Mary Tamm) tell them that Trevor had led her to believe that his parents were dead.

One high point of the Ogdens' marriage was in the late-1970s, when they won a second honeymoon at the Savoy Hotel. A limousine whisked them from Coronation Street to the hotel, where they received free champagne. Hilda decked out in a silk nightdress, only to find that, typically, Stan had fallen fast asleep. Although the night was a quiet one, it was a fond memory for Stan and Hilda as they entered old age.

In the early-1980s, Eddie secured a job as a binman, and became Stan and Hilda's lodger. He saw Stan and Hilda as surrogate parents, and they saw him as a son. Stan was in his sixties and slowing down (mirroring the deteriorating health of actor Bernard Youens). Eddie helped him on his window-cleaning round, later buying it and making Stan his employee. However, Stan's deterioration was rapid and Hilda took extra cleaning jobs to make some money, including cleaning Mike Baldwin's (Johnny Briggs) factory and Dr. Lowther's house.

In December 1983, Stan and Hilda celebrated their greatest milestone, their ruby wedding anniversary. Eddie left the same night to move to Bury, and thanked Stan and Hilda for being there for him and acting as surrogate parents.

Stan's disappearance was explained as him being in bed, ill, and later admitted to hospital offscreen. He made his last on-screen appearance on 7 March 1984. After that, actor Bernard Youens became too ill to continue working and died on 27 August 1984. Shortly afterwards, the decision was made to kill off the character.

On 21 November 1984, Hilda received a phone call telling her that Stan had died in hospital of gangrene. This led to a memorable scene as Hilda returned from the hospital after his funeral with a small package of Stan's belongings. As she silently opened the package, she found a case containing his spectacles. Opening the case, she begins to cry, and the episode ends in silence, without the usual theme tune.

== Reception ==
In Dorothy Catherine Anger's book "Other worlds: society seen through soap opera," she brands Stan as one of the "middle aged men" who "over the years have, stymied their wives' efforts to be accepted as respectable".

In the January 1985 issue of British current affairs magazine Third Way Magazine, Coronation Street was slated for its attitude to unemployment, stating it seemed not to be a problem because Stan was a "well loved layabout".
