= Rovers Return Inn =

Fictional public house in Coronation Street

- Coronation Street organization
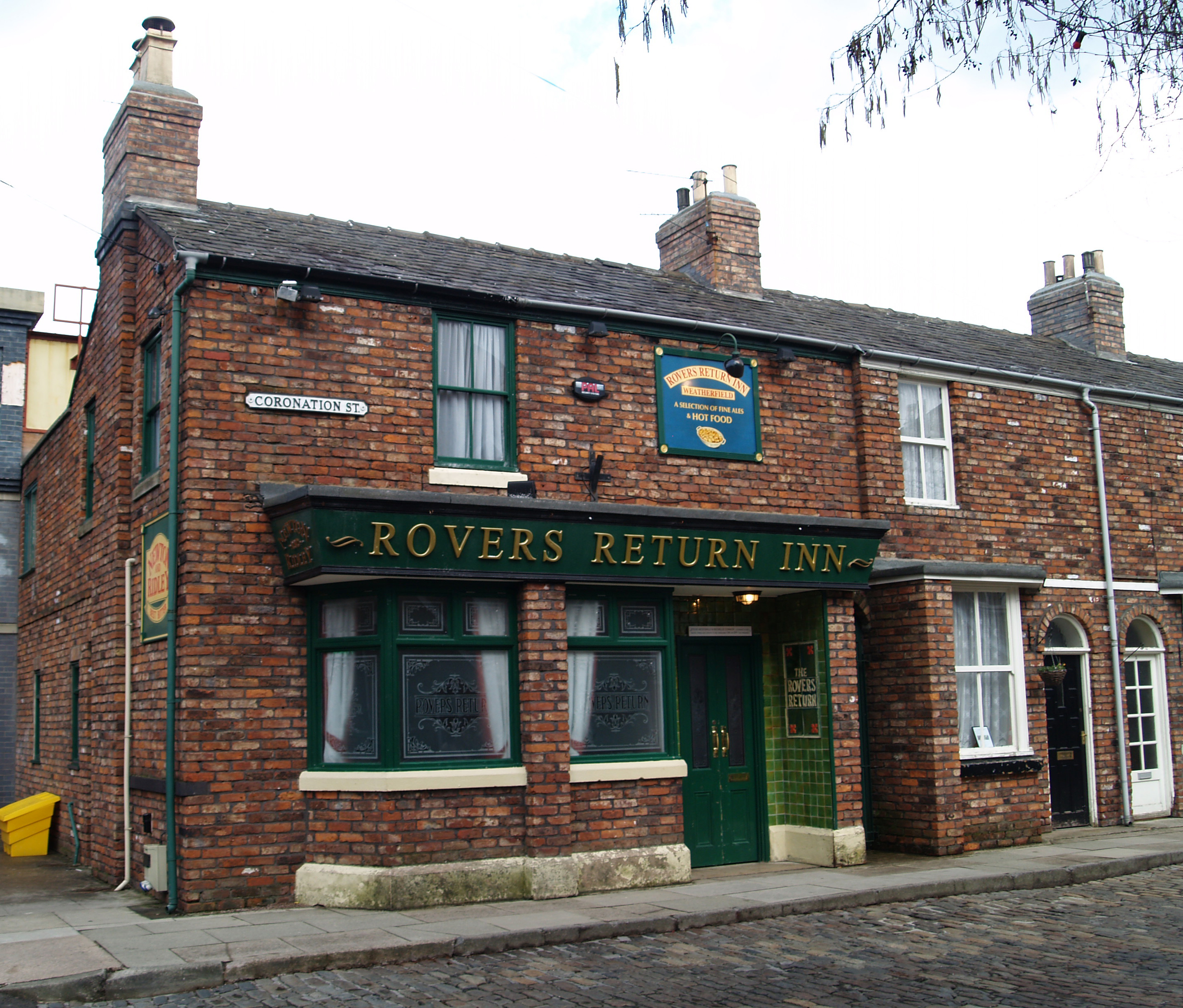
- Rovers Return Inn exterior, as it appeared onscreen, from May 2013 to January 2014.
- First appearance: Episode 1 (1960)
- Created by: Tony Warren
- Genre: Soap opera

In-universe information
- Type: Pub
- Founded: 1902
- Address: Rovers Return Inn, Coronation Street
- Location: Weatherfield
- Owners: Ben & Maggie Driscoll

The Rovers Return Inn, also known simply as the Rovers, is a fictional public house in the long-running British soap opera Coronation Street.

The Rovers Return occupies a corner of the fictional Coronation Street and Rosamund Street set location in the show, set in the fictional Lancashire town of Weatherfield. The pub was constructed by the fictional brewery Newton and Ridley.

The name comes from the Ye Olde Rovers Return in Withy Grove, Manchester, a 14th-century building that operated as a licensed public house but ceased to be so in 1924 and was demolished in 1958.

The fictional pub has had three in-universe layouts. The original layout generally consisted of the style of a public bar. The fictional pub was later destroyed after a fire, caused by character Jack Duckworth. Later, the original layout was replaced by a single bar, until once again, being destroyed by a fire.

== History ==
The Rover's Return Inn opened in 1902 on the newly built Coronation Street (1902 being Coronation year for Edward VII). It was originally to be called The Coronation, but the brewery was forced to change the name as the go-ahead had already been given for the street to be named Coronation Street. When Lieutenant Philip Ridley returned from active service in the Boer War, the pub was named in his honour.

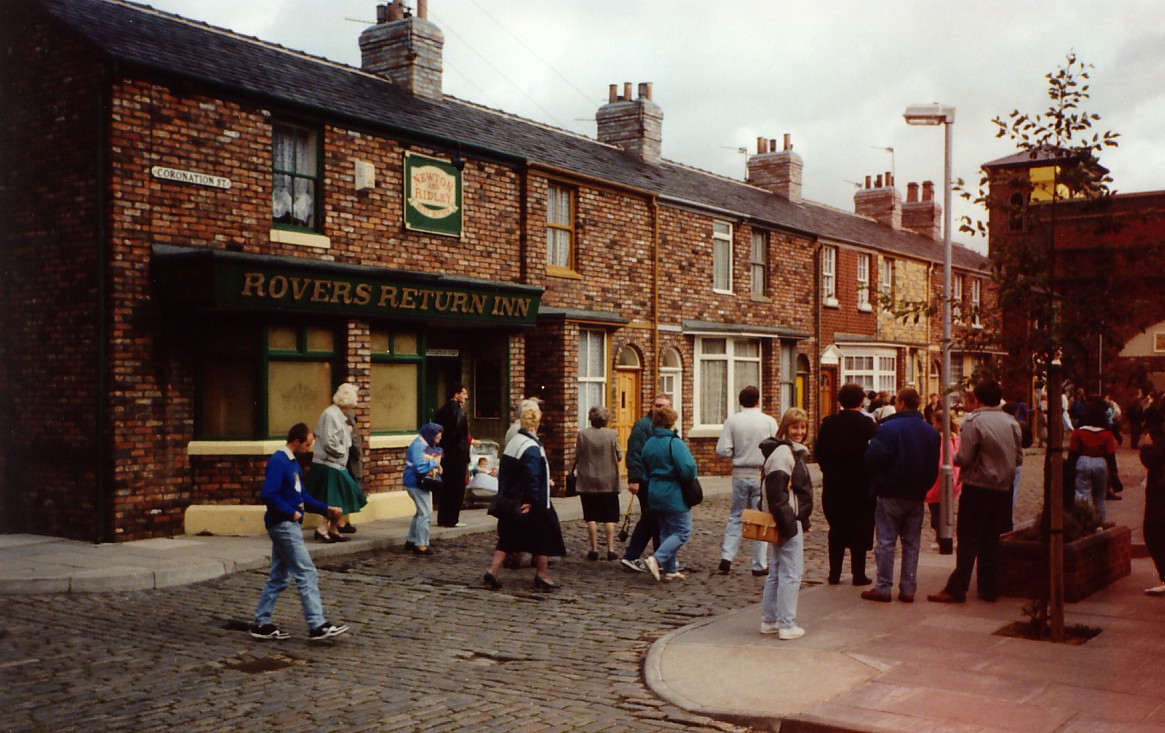
Visitors tour the Coronation Street set.

Originally, the pub was divided into three separate bars: the public bar, the snug (usually inhabited by unaccompanied ladies, where drinks were half a penny cheaper), and the select (where drinks were pricier but were served by a waitress). As late as 1960, the ruling in the pub was that ladies were not allowed to remain at the bar after being served. These archaic rules were dropped soon afterwards. When the pub was damaged by an accidental fire in 1986, the three bars were knocked into one large room.

The living quarters downstairs bear no resemblance to the exterior set of the pub. In reality, the living room (the "backroom") would be in the middle of the street at the side of the pub, outside the medical centre.

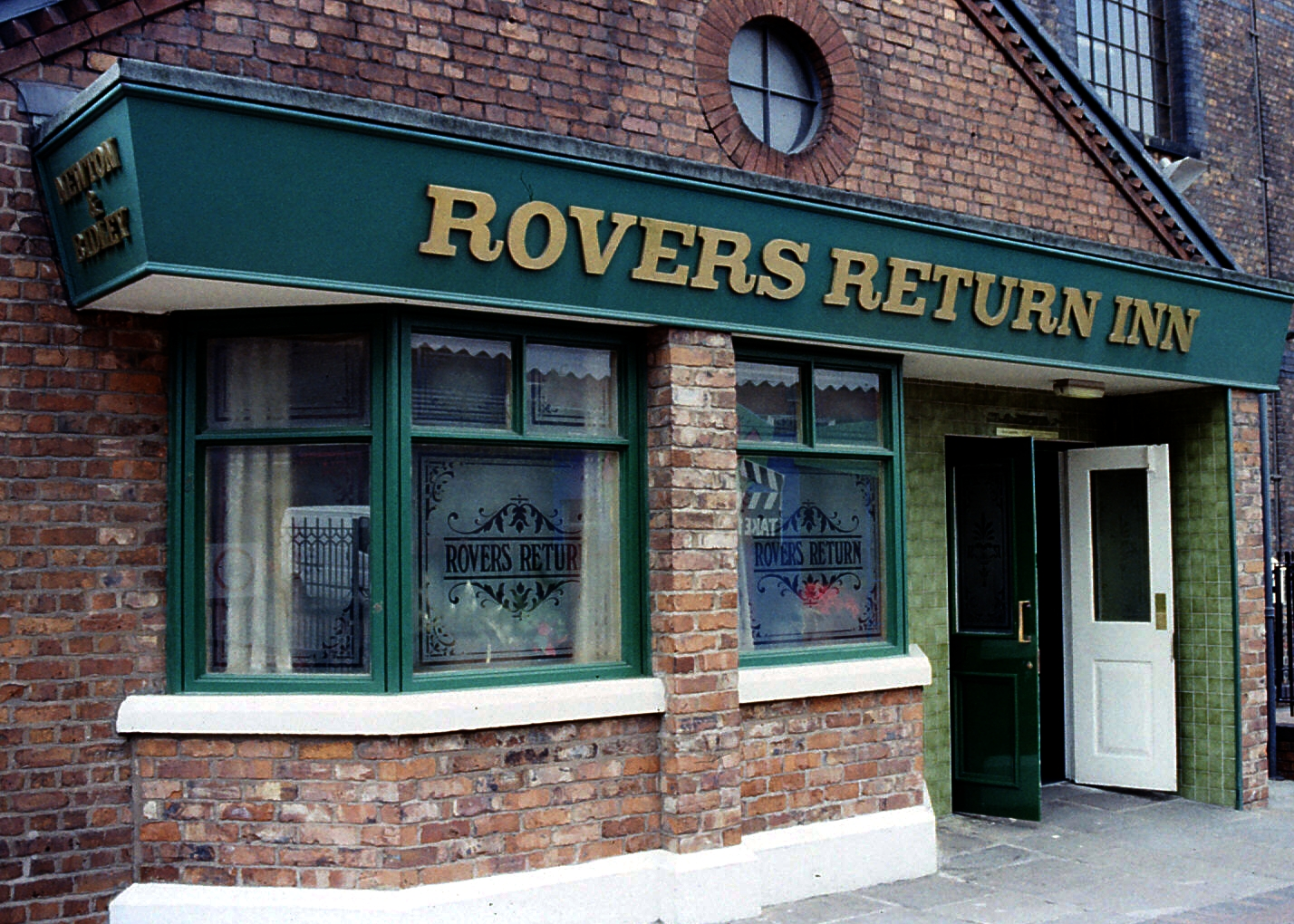
A replica of the Rovers Return pub, from the British soap opera Coronation Street. This pub, open to the public, was located on the Granada Studios Tour Manchester, England, in the same complex as the set used on the show.

Since 2008, viewers have seen scenes in a kitchen/dining room in the upstairs of the pub (for use by the licensee/residents), although no other characters had ever used or referred to this room previously. A mock-up of the snug was a feature of the Granada Studios Tour.

The set's exterior doors are narrower than the doors on the interior set. This has always been the case as the exterior set is reduced in scale.

The Rovers before and after with the new wallpaper, floor and soft furnishings

The Rovers in late 2008, with new wallpaper similar to the original style. Shown are Jason Grimshaw, Steve McDonald, Lloyd Mullaney, Dev Alahan and Kirk Sutherland mourning Liam Connor, killed in a hit and run planned by Tony Gordon.

In early 2008, the Rovers Return was redecorated, giving it a fresh look more than 20 years after the refurbishment that followed the fire of 1986. It received new wallpaper, re-upholstered seating, new flooring, and new light fittings. A smoking shelter was built, reflecting the recent introduction of a national ban on smoking in enclosed public places, which is accessed by a new door in the main pub area.

Since that makeover in February 2008, the wallpaper was changed again in October 2008, making its on-screen debut on 17 October 2008. The producers were dissatisfied with the choice of wallpaper in February 2008. The new wallpaper is similar to the wallpaper used after the 1986 fire, which hung in The Rovers for 22 years.

The Rovers before and after with the new taps, pumps at the bar and new curtains

The change of décor in February 2008 was a storyline in the show, in which Liz McDonald's (Beverley Callard) husband Vernon Tomlin (Ian Reddington) hired friends to redecorate. The new look of The Rovers in October 2008 was not explained in the story. A few weeks later, Emily Bishop (Eileen Derbyshire) commented to Jed Stone (Kenneth Cope) that the local pub had "recently" been redecorated.

== Events ==
The fictional timeline proceeds as follows:

- 13 May 1964: Martha Longhurst (Lynne Carol) dies after suffering a heart attack in the snug of The Rovers.
- 7 March 1979: A lorry crashes into The Rovers Return, injuring several people including Alf Roberts (Bryan Mosley), Mike Baldwin (Johnny Briggs) and Betty Turpin (Betty Driver). Deirdre Langton (Anne Kirkbride) panics because she left a young Tracy (Christabel Finch) sitting outside in her pram, but it emerges that she was kidnapped by Sally Norton (Yvonne Nicholson).
- 18 June 1986: A faulty electricity box starts a fire in the pub, and the whole interior explodes. Bet Lynch (Julie Goodyear) is asleep upstairs, but is eventually rescued by Kevin Webster (Michael Le Vell).
- 12 February 1993: Outside the pub, Lisa Duckworth (Caroline Milmoe) is run over by a speeding motorist while crossing the road. She is taken to hospital, but never regains consciousness and is pronounced dead a few days later.
- 13 April 2001: Toyah Battersby (Georgia Taylor) is raped in the alleyway beside The Rovers by an unseen assailant who is later revealed to be Phil Simmonds (Jack Deam).
- 10 April 2005: Tracy Barlow's (Kate Ford) biological father Ray Langton (Neville Buswell) dies of stomach cancer during a party to celebrate the second wedding of his ex-wife Deirdre Rachid (Anne Kirkbride) to Ken Barlow (William Roache).
- 22 February 2008: Violet Wilson (Jenny Platt) gives birth to her son Dylan assisted by Marcus Dent (Charlie Condou).
- 23 January 2012: During the wedding reception of Tracy Barlow (Kate Ford) and Steve McDonald (Simon Gregson), Steve's ex-wife Becky (Katherine Kelly) reveals that Tracy suffered a miscarriage the day before she blamed Becky for the miscarriage, thus meaning that Tracy was lying. Steve subsequently leaves Tracy.
- 9 September 2012: Kirsty Soames (Natalie Gumede) goes into labour after a fight with barmaid Tina McIntyre (Michelle Keegan). She later gives birth to her daughter Ruby Dobbs in the back room.
- 18 March 2013: In an attempt to frame Jason Grimshaw (Ryan Thomas) for arson, Karl Munro (John Michie) sets fire to The Rovers, leaving Stella Price (Michelle Collins) and Sunita Alahan (Shobna Gulati) hospitalised, and killing Toni Griffiths (Tara Moran) and later Sunita.
- 26 May 2013: After telling Izzy Armstrong (Cherylee Houston) that Gary Windass (Mikey North) had made a pass at her, Tina McIntyre (Michelle Keegan) goes into labour with their child two months early.
- 14 October 2013: After accusing barmaid Tina McIntyre (Michelle Keegan) of having an affair with her husband David (Jack P. Shepherd), Kylie Platt (Paula Lane) attacks her in The Rovers, leading to an explosive catfight. During the fight, Liz McDonald (Beverley Callard) returns to Coronation Street and announces that she is now co-owner of The Rovers.
- 25 December 2013: A drunken Kylie Platt (Paula Lane) makes a pass at Rob Donovan (Marc Baylis) and ends up brawling with Tina McIntyre (Michelle Keegan) yet again outside of The Rovers.
- 22 January 2014: Anna Windass (Debbie Rush) walks into The Rovers and reveals the news of Hayley Cropper's (Julie Hesmondhalgh) death to the regulars.
- 27 May 2014: Peter Barlow (Chris Gascoyne) tells his wife Carla Connor (Alison King) about his affair with Tina McIntyre (Michelle Keegan) in the backroom. She storms into the pub, shouting that she wants to "kill" Tina. When Tina is later attacked and dies, Carla becomes the prime suspect.
- 13 May 2015: Liz McDonald (Beverley Callard) is attacked by two thugs, but she is unaware that her partner Tony Stewart (Terence Maynard) arranged the horrific attack.
- 21 October 2016: Following David Platt's (Jack P. Shepherd) horrific car accident on the street, an explosion caused by leaking petrol rips through the street and blows in The Rovers' windows, which also leaves Michelle Connor (Kym Marsh) in a state of shock.
- 15 September 2017: Rita Tanner (Barbara Knox) publicly collapses at Jenny Bradley (Sally Ann Matthews) and Eva Price's (Catherine Tyldesley) joint hen party, as a result of a brain tumour.
- 25 December 2019: Derek Milligan (Craige Els) storms into the pub armed with a shotgun and holds many residents hostage, including Gary Windass (Mikey North), Ali Neeson (James Burrows), Johnny Connor (Richard Hawley), Jenny Connor (Sally Ann Matthews), Rita Tanner (Barbara Knox), Izzy Armstrong (Cherylee Houston), Fiz Stape (Jennie McAlpine), Tyrone Dobbs (Alan Halsall), Seb Franklin (Harry Visinoni), Tracy McDonald (Kate Ford), Liz McDonald (Beverley Callard), Steve McDonald (Simon Gregson) and Emma Brooker (Alexandra Mardell). He later fights with Gary and Ali, before shooting outside to show the locals that the gun is in fact loaded, however the bullet hits Robert Preston (Tristan Gemmill), who is about to enter the pub. Robert later dies in hospital from the shooting.
- 27 March 2023: As she and Ryan Connor (Ryan Prescott) prepare to leave the pub to go to her wedding to Daniel Osbourne (Rob Mallard), Daisy Midgeley (Charlotte Jordan) is confronted by her stalker Justin Rutherford (Andrew Still), who throws a bottle of sulphuric acid at her. Ryan comes to Daisy's defence and jumps in front of her and gets most of the acid in his face and upper body whilst Daisy gets some on her chest. Justin flees the scene but is later arrested after Daisy confronts him in Weatherfield General's car park and alerts the police.
- 29 March 2024: Glenda Shuttleworth (Jodie Prenger) is left alone to run a speed dating night in the pub after Jenny and Daisy make plans that coincide with the night. She meets a man who she jokingly complains to about being left alone. Later that night, Glenda closes the pub as a group of masked men enter and attack her whilst looting the pub.

== Employees ==
=== Current staff ===
Character	Job role(s)	Duration
Ben Driscoll	Co–owner (50%) / Landlord	2025–present
Maggie Driscoll	Co–owner (50%)	2025–present
Eva Price	Landlady	2025–present
Sean Tully	Barman / Cook	2005–present
Gemma Winter-Brown	Barmaid	2018–present
Glenda Shuttleworth	Barmaid	2025–present
Lauren Bolton	Barmaid	2025–present
Ollie Driscoll	Cook	2025–present

=== Previous staff ===
Job role	Characters
Owners	Jack Duckworth, Vera Duckworth, Alec Gilroy, Natalie Barnes, Mike Baldwin, Duggie Ferguson, Fred Elliott, Stella Price, Gloria Price, Tony Stewart, Steve McDonald, Liz McDonald, Peter Barlow, Toyah Battersby, Johnny Connor, Newton & Ridley, Jenny Bradley, Daisy Midgeley, Carla Connor
Landlords	Jim Corbishley, George Diggins, Jack Walker, Billy Walker, Alec Gilroy, Jack Duckworth, Duggie Ferguson, Fred Elliott, Steve McDonald, Peter Barlow, Johnny Connor
Landladies	Nellie Corbishley, Mary Diggins, Annie Walker, Bet Lynch, Vera Duckworth, Natalie Barnes, Eve Elliott, Stella Price, Michelle Connor, Liz McDonald, Toyah Battersby, Jenny Bradley
General managers	Vince Plummer, Brenda Riley, Billy Walker, Glyn Thomas, Gordon Lewis, Fred Gee, Frank Harvey, Liz McDonald, Rodney Bostock, Jim McDonald, Linda Baldwin, Lillian Spencer, Shelley Unwin, Stella Price, Peter Barlow, Carla Connor, Glenda Shuttleworth
Barmaids	Janey Atkinson, Sarah Bridges, Avis Buck, Flo Chad, Lil Foyle, Edna Tatlock, Sally Todd, Lottie Kemp, Gracie Ashton, Lizzie Hewitt, Concepta Riley, Nona Willis, Doreen Lostock, Irma Ogden, Emily Bishop, Lucille Hewitt, Betty Williams, Bet Lynch, Blanche Hunt, Gail Platt, Dawn Perks, Arlene Jones, Carole Fairbanks, Diane Hawkins, Suzie Birchall, Kath Goodwin, Maureen Barnett, Gloria Todd, Sally Webster, Alison Dougherty, Margo Richardson, Tina Fowler, Liz McDonald, Angie Freeman, Raquel Watts, Tanya Pooley, Vera Duckworth, Carol Starkey, Lorraine Ramsden, Tricia Armstrong, Joyce Smedley, Judy Mallett, Samantha Failsworth, Natalie Barnes, Lorraine Brownlow, Leanne Battersby, Amy Goskirk, Toyah Battersby, Geena Gregory, Shelley Unwin, Edna Miller, Eve Elliott, Linda Sykes, Maria Connor, Tracy Barlow, Bev Unwin, Violet Wilson, Michelle Connor, Lauren Wilson, Becky McDonald, Kelly Crabtree, Poppy Morales, Tina McIntyre, Eva Price, Sunita Alahan, Gloria Price, Mandy Kamara, Eileen Grimshaw, Sarah Platt, Emma Brooker, Daisy Midgeley
Barmen	Ivan Cheveski, Sam Leach, Jacko Ford, Terry Bradshaw, Stan Ogden, Fred Gee, Wilf Starkey, Frank Mills, Charlie Bracewell, Jack Duckworth, Andy McDonald, Bill Webster, Sandy Hunter, Martin Platt, Gary Mallett, Spider Nugent, Vinny Sorrell, Jim McDonald, Harry Flagg, Timothy Spencer, Steve McDonald, Ciaran McCarthy, Vernon Tomlin, Lewis Archer, Karl Munro, Jason Grimshaw, Tony Stewart, Henry Newton, Ryan Connor
Cooks	Betty Williams, Ciaran McCarthy, Mandy Kamara
Cleaners	Martha Longhurst, Clara Midgeley, Hilda Ogden, Amy Burton, Sandra Stubbs, Tricia Armstrong, Joyce Smedley, Vera Duckworth, Edna Miller, Harry Flagg, Anna Windass

== Incidents ==
=== Martha's death (1964) ===
Episode 357, transmitted: 13 May 1964

In 1964, the producership of Coronation Street was handed to the young and enthusiastic Tim Aspinall. He immediately began to implement changes. Since it had been fully networked across the various ITV regions in 1960, Coronation Street had never been out of the top ten ratings of the week (that continues 61 years on). However, competition came from the BBC (there were only two channels in those days, BBC Television and ITV – BBC 2 was to follow later that year). The BBC placed their most popular comedy series Steptoe and Son opposite the programme. In the pre-video recorder days, viewers were forced to choose what to watch, and, as a consequence, Coronation Street began to lose the ratings. It was decided, by Aspinall, that several "blockbuster" storylines would have to be staged, the most radical being the death of Martha Longhurst (Lynne Carol).

Despite being a nosy old gossip and, in the Mancunian dialect of the show was "... no better than she should be....", Martha was a highly popular character; thus, she was chosen to be killed off in a highly cynical bid to boost the ratings.

On the night of her death, the credits rolled in silence for the very first time (something that would later become the norm whenever a character was "killed off"), with the rooftop scene replaced by a close up of the snug table that contained a sherry glass, a passport and Martha's famous NHS spectacles.

=== Lorry crash (1979) ===
Episode 1893, transmitted: 7 March 1979

Deirdre Langton (Anne Kirkbride) wheeled her young daughter Tracy (Christabel Finch) down to The Rovers in her pram. She was to see Annie Walker (Doris Speed) with regards to a knitting pattern. Knowing Annie's strict rules concerning children on licensed premises, Tracy was left outside in her pushchair.

No more than two minutes had passed as Deirdre and Annie spoke in the back room. Suddenly, their conversation was halted by the screeching of brakes followed by a terrible crash, which shook the pub. Annie froze but Deirdre rushed through the pub and outside where she had left Tracy. In that very spot was a 6-foot pile of timber. Accompanying the pile was a lorry, turned on its side and smoking from the crash.

Inside the pub, Alf Roberts (Bryan Mosley) had been sitting with friend, Len Fairclough (Peter Adamson) in front of the window. Alf lay unconscious as Len, whose own arm was broken, desperately tried to help him.

The story concluded when Tracy was found not to be under the timber but had been snatched away moments before the pub was hit. The snatcher was a crazed young woman called Sally Norton (Yvonne Nicholson) who had become obsessed with Tracy. Mother and daughter were reunited later by the canal as Tracy was rushed into the arms of Deirdre. For Alf, the scars remained, and he underwent a personality change months after he returned from the hospital.

=== Fire (1986) ===
Episode 2631, Transmitted: 18 June 1986

During a sing-along night, when the guests stood around the piano, the lights in the pub had been flickering and cutting out all night, much to the frustration of Bet Lynch (Julie Goodyear) and the rest of the punters. Jack Duckworth (Bill Tarmey), potman at the time, decided to fix the problem. Upon return, he was graciously thanked for solving the problem. However, he had replaced the fuse with a far stronger one, leaving the problem of a potential explosion. Bet retired to bed that night, having locked up. In the middle of the night, the inevitable happened, and the fuse caught fire. This scene was shown at the end of the previous episode, Episode 2630 on 16 June 1986.

Inside, Bet had finally woken up and raced out of her bedroom to attempt to escape, only to find her exit down the stairs blocked by flames that leapt up at her from the hallway. She released a blood-curdling scream and ran back into the bedroom, fearing for her life, and collapsed unconscious, overcome from the smoke, before she could reach the window. Julie Goodyear later revealed that her nightdress, supposedly fire-proofed, had, in fact, caught fire during filming of the scene, and she was in genuine danger. She said in the 2010 documentary "Coronation Street – 50 Years, 50 Moments" that "the scream at the top of the stairs was for real. I was terrified."

Kevin climbed up the ladder and arrived at the window, using a brick to smash and then open it. Shouting to the rest of the residents that he could see Bet, he climbed in. Down below, the front windows of the pub exploded out into the Street, sending shocked residents screaming and running. As Kevin dragged Bet to the window, the Fire Brigade arrived to take over.

The fire was quickly extinguished, but the Rovers was completely destroyed, and the cause was quickly identified as an electrical fault after an examination of the ruined fuse box. Breaking with convention, the episode ended not with Bet fighting for her life, which would have been the usual soap opera cliché, but the pub itself, which Newton and Ridley thought was not worth saving and initially intended to demolish. Once the Rovers was renovated and refurbished, however, Bet pinned an electrician's number up on the board telling Jack to call upon the services of a professional, as they had the Rovers back and she intended on keeping it.

=== Ray Langton's death (2005) ===
In 2005, Ray Langton (Neville Buswell) returned to Coronation Street, where he died of stomach cancer. His death was the second death in the history of Coronation Street to take place inside The Rovers.

=== Dylan Wilson's birth (2008) ===
In February 2008, barmaid Violet Wilson (Jenny Platt) gave birth in the pub to Dylan who was fathered by gay barman Sean Tully (Antony Cotton). Landlady Liz McDonald (Beverley Callard), Eileen Grimshaw (Sue Cleaver) and Vernon Tomlin (Ian Reddington) were present at the birth. Sean's boyfriend, Marcus Dent (Charlie Condou), delivered the baby.

=== Cellar (2008) ===
Episode 6834, Transmitted: 6 June 2008

In June 2008, Steve McDonald (Simon Gregson) and Dan Mason (Matthew Crompton) became engaged in a petty feud. Steve believed that Dan scratched his car (the real culprit was Norris Cole (Malcolm Hebden) ), which resulted in Steve stealing Dan's mobile phone. At closing time, Dan went to the pub to confront Steve. He ended up hitting Steve by accident. Steve then struck Dan with a crate and threw the mobile down the cellar stairs. When Dan went to retrieve it, Steve locked him in the cellar. Dan, suffering pain from the blow of the crate, fell over in agony on the stairs. Steve, however, had already left and did not hear his shouts for help. The next day, Michelle Connor (Kym Marsh) found Dan and he was rushed to hospital. Steve was arrested for attempted murder and unlawful imprisonment.

=== Fire (2013) ===
On 18 March 2013, Karl Munro (John Michie) set fire to the pub's cellar to frame Jason Grimshaw (Ryan Thomas) but was caught by Sunita Alahan (Shobna Gulati) who was knocked unconscious by Karl when he fled to the Bistro to do his "Full Monty" act. Norris Cole (Malcolm Hebden) and Emily Bishop (Eileen Derbyshire) came into the restaurant to tell everyone about the fire, and Karl discovered Stella was upstairs in one of the pub's bedrooms, so he went back in to save her. As he got to her, the stairs collapsed, trapping them. Luckily Paul Kershaw (Tony Hirst) managed to get to them and got Stella out while his friend and fellow firefighter Toni Griffiths (Tara Moran) got Karl out before the roof collapsed on top of her and killed her. Shortly afterwards the fire brigade arrived, put out the fire and were able to get Sunita out. The fire caused significant damage and caused financial problems for Stella meaning that she could not afford to hire Owen Armstrong (Ian Puleston-Davies) to do the refurb but after a failed attempt of offering Owen half the pub in exchange for the refurb, Stella's mother Gloria (Sue Johnston) paid him the £80,000 required to complete the work. Sunita was in a coma for a while and was killed by Karl when she began to recover. The Rovers re-opened on 26 May 2013.

== Interior set ==
The Rovers Return set features walls and windows that can be removed to allow filming from different angles. There is a painted backdrop which looks over to the Metcalfes' house, Audrey's salon and the flat above the salon.

== See also ==
- List of businesses in Weatherfield
- John Waite named his 1987 album Rover's Return after the famous meeting place.
- The Korgis also had an album track named Rover's Return on their 1980 album Dumb Waiters

== References in popular culture ==
In a 2021 episode of podcast, Something Rhymes with Purple, 'Torquemada', Susie Dent and Gyles Brandreth discuss cryptic crosswords. One clue is: "Bar of Soap." The answer is the Rovers Return, because this is a bar, within (or 'of') a soap (this soap being Coronation Street).

== Bibliography ==
- Little, Daran. Life and Times at 'The Rovers Return'. Boxtree, 1994.
- Banham, Martin. The Cambridge Guide to Theatre. Cambridge University Press, 1995. page 1067.
