= Martha Longhurst =

Fictional character from Coronation Street

- Coronation Street character
- Portrayed by: Lynne Carol
- Duration: 1960–1964
- First appearance: 14 December 1960; Episode 2
- Last appearance: 13 May 1964
- Created by: Tony Warren
- Introduced by: Stuart Latham
In-universe information
- Occupation: Cleaner
- Father: Jack Hartley
- Mother: Mary Hartley
- Husband: Percy Longhurst (backstory)
- Sons: Harold Longhurst
- Daughters: Lily Haddon
- Granddaughters: Sandra Haddon; Pauline Haddon

Martha Longhurst is a fictional character from the British ITV Soap Opera Coronation Street. She was played by Lynne Carol from the show's inception in 1960, from the second episode until the character's death in 1964.

== Creation and casting ==
The character of Martha was conceived early on, when Tony Warren realised that the character he devised Ena Sharples (Violet Carson) would need some drinking companions. His experiences of the real-world Enas and their cronies greatly informed the character; Warren said of it, "Whenever you got tough old viragoes like Ena, they always had henchmen. They generally had a talkative one that could be shouted down, and then there was always a silent one who nodded but was a bit rebellious". The former character outline turned into Martha Longhurst, and the latter Minnie Caldwell (Margot Bryant).

Martha was present in the second of the two dry runs made in November 1960, where she was played by fellow Welsh-born actress Doris Hare. During final casting for the show proper, casting director Margaret Morris offered Hare the larger part of Ena Sharples, but Hare, a noted theatre actress had to turn it down as she had commitments with the Royal Shakespeare Company.

Lynne Carol had been a child performer since the age of three and went on to have a long career in theatre, radio and television. Though Martha was said to be the second-oldest character in the programme, 46-year-old Carol was given the part of the 64-year-old Martha. Her relative youth compared with her co-stars was obscured by the character's wardrobe, with Martha normally wearing a hairnet, beret, spectacles, and an old mackintosh, all of which were provided by Carol who bought them second-hand in a jumble sale.

== Development ==
=== Friendships ===
Martha and Minnie were initially supporting characters, with their storylines revolving around Ena Sharples. Over time, they got stories of their own, notably Martha's attempts to effect a relationship with her old school friend Ted Ashley (Jerold Wells).

The three were most often seen in the Rovers snug, where they reminisced and shared the latest gossip over glasses of milk stout. Most of these scenes weren't connected to any storylines, but proved very popular with viewers. Carol stated in an interview, "The scriptwriters used to say that. 'We don't need to think about scenes for you, you three, we can say anything, and as soon as they see those three chairs round the table that's it, and you can make it funny without meaning to, just by being ordinary.'" About the popularity of Martha in particular, Carol once told Weekend: "There are an awful lot of Marthas in the world. Some viewers used to tell me to mind my own business but most people could see that Martha was really a pathetic old dear."

=== Departure ===
In 1964, 29-year-old ex-journalist Tim Aspinall replaced Margaret Morris as Coronation Street's producer. January that year had seen Coronation Street beaten to first place in the ratings by a regular episode of another TV programme for the first time since November 1961 (the sitcom Steptoe and Son on BBC One). Although ratings were actually up on the same month in 1963, Aspinall felt that Coronation Street needed a shake-up.

Carol was one of several unsuspecting cast members informed by Margaret Morris that they had been fired. Nearly half the cast were axed, although some of them were granted a reprieve by H.V. Kershaw when he returned as producer in September after working on Granada's The Villains. Carol was the first to depart, with Martha suffering a fatal heart attack in the Rovers snug in Tim Aspinall's inaugural episode as producer, broadcast on 13 May 1964. Due to the nature of the character's exit, and her popularity with the cast and viewers, Carol's colleagues fought her sacking, with Violet Carson threatening to resign. She was talked round by Carol. When rehearsing the death scene, Peter Adamson refused to deliver the line "she's dead", and during recording he hesitated before saying it so that his words could be cut, with the order likely to come from Cecil Bernstein, one of Granada's chairmen who was the programme's strongest advocate within senior management. However, no such order was given. After her sacking was announced by the press on 7 April, Carol spoke to a reporter, where she was resigned to her fate: "They've been three wonderful years, and I am sorry to be leaving so many good friends behind me."

Martha was the first character to have an on-screen burial. The graveside scenes were shot on location at Manchester General Cemetery in Harphurey on 12 May. The episode featuring Martha's death was shown with silent end credits played over a shot of Martha's glasses, passport and sherry glass on the snug table she was sitting at when she died. Carol played Martha one further time; her voice was heard in the following episode, when Ena and Minnie played an old recording of Martha's in which she and an unknown man called Philip proclaimed their love for each other. The same episode featured Stephanie Bidmead as Lily Haddon, Martha's daughter who previously had been spoken of frequently but never seen.

== Storylines ==
By the 1960s, Martha has retired and is drawing her pension. Money is tight, but she makes it last, without having to work to supplement it. In December, when Ena Sharples (Violet Carson) collapses due to stress and has a spell in hospital, Leonard Swindley (Arthur Lowe) asks Martha to temporarily take over Ena's caretaker duties at the Glad Tidings Mission Hall. Martha accepts but only lasts a few days, as Ena's suspicious nature leads her to walk out of hospital and return to her vestry, senile decay or not. Dismissing Martha from her post, Ena catches her friend using her feather duster, and accuses her of rooting through her things. Martha protests her innocence, and the pair spend a few weeks not speaking to each other, until they agree, to forgive and forget.

In March 1963, Martha is taken on by Jack (Arthur Leslie), and Annie Walker (Doris Speed), as the new Rovers Return Inn cleaner. She also works in the same capacity at Laurie Fraser's (Stanley Meadows) Viaduct Sporting Club, the following year. Although she pushes herself hard, Martha is pleased to be able to put some money away.

In the summer of 1963, Martha sees a doctor and is put on pills which she takes three times a day - a fact she keeps private, even from her family and friends. With health issues and money stashed away, Martha is of a mind to break from her mundane routine. The catalyst is the return of Ted Ashley (Jerold Wells), a former classmate at Bessie Street who has long since emigrated to Australia, and makes a good life for himself, as a farmer and shopkeeper. Ted is back in Weatherfield to look up old friends, and visit his cousin Clara - who also happens to be Martha's next-door neighbour. Setting her cap at Ted, who is now a widower, Martha asks Clara to invite him over to hers for tea. Ena's suspicions are aroused when Martha buys a tin of the best salmon from the corner shop, and invites both her, and Minnie Caldwell (Margot Bryant), to tea, even though it isn't a Sunday. Ted does turn up, but he barely remembers the ladies from his school days, and gets his memories of them hopelessly confused. Martha clings to Ted throughout his stay, and the man is too gentlemanly to put her off. When Martha tells him that she has never been out of Lancashire, Ted suggests that she could go to London to stay with his sister, Alice, as she misses the north. Martha took this as an invitation to go along with him when he leaves Weatherfield, and she immediately makes travel arrangements - much to the surprise of Ted, who has no romantic interest in Martha. Martha goes to London, expecting a proposal from Ted, but none comes, and instead she spends her time sightseeing on her own. Back in Weatherfield, a humiliated Martha hides away from her friends, although Frank Barlow (Frank Pemberton) spots her going into her house, and tells everyone that she is back. Ena and Minnie confront her and she sheepishly admits that Ted has shown no affection for her whatsoever.

Martha enjoys London itself, and the excursion had whet her appetite for travel. When invited to go on holiday in Spain with her daughter Lily Haddon (Stephanie Bidmead) and family, Martha buys her first passport and proudly shows it off to anyone who showed the slightest interest. It was during a singsong at a party in the Rovers, thrown by Frank Barlow, to celebrate his selling his shop that Martha becomes ill and retreats to her usual chair, in the empty snug. Unnoticed by anyone else, Martha has a sudden heart attack, which kills her almost instantly. She is eventually spotted by Myra Booth (Susan Jameson), who thinks that she has fallen asleep. When Jack Walker fails to revive her, he alerts Annie, and Len Fairclough (Peter Adamson). While Jack calls for a doctor, the revellers stop singing and look towards the snug, one by one. Ena, on the pub's piano, is the last to notice. Failing to find a pulse, Len declares Martha dead.

Martha is laid out in the vestry bedroom prior to being buried in the family plot with her husband, Percy. Her insurance policies only comes to £22, 4s and 9d; not enough for a funeral, so Lily and her husband Wilf (Henry Livings) have to pay the rest. Helping Lily clear out the house, Ena and Minnie happen upon the record Martha and an unnamed man had made, in Blackpool, in 1934. Although unable to identify the man in the recording, they realise that Martha had an affair with him, and are pleased to know that their friend had once had some fun in her life before returning to her violent husband.

The 1964 episode of her death, was not the last time Martha Longhurst featured in a Coronation Street storyline. Over ten years after her death, Betty Turpin (Betty Driver) reports hearing a voice like Martha's in the snug. Ena also claims that she has seen Martha's ghost in the snug on several occasions. The residents later use a Ouija board to try and call Martha from beyond the grave; the storyline concludes with Martha's glasses being found in the snug, in the exact position they were, when they toppled off her face as she suffered her heart attack.

== Reception ==
The killing of Martha has since been heavily criticised, with H.V. Kershaw describing it as one of the worst decisions in Coronation Street history. Kershaw: "No doubt Tim Aspinall felt that by such action he would bring the programme a great deal of publicity and in this he certainly succeeded. However I do feel - and this is only a personal opinion - that he broke the rule of conservation. By killing an established character he doubtlessly gave us a few episodes of high drama and created a talking-point in the factories and laundrettes which boosted our viewing figures for a period, but when the dust settled we were simply left with a Coronation Street without Martha Longhurst. The trio had been reduced to a rather sad duet and there is little doubt that by that one action many future stories were denied us."

Subsequent producers have lamented the loss of Martha, with Bill Podmore referring to it as "the Street's greatest mistake". After the death of actress Margot Bryant in 1988, Podmore appeared with Carol on a BBC Open Air programme where they discussed the possibility of Carol returning to the programme as Martha's twin sister, who had been living in Australia, although the idea went no further.
