= Sheila Birtles =

Fictional character from Coronation Street

- Coronation Street character
- Portrayed by: Eileen Mayers
- Duration: 1961–1963, 1966, 1969, 1974
- First appearance: Episode 8; 4 January 1961
- Last appearance: Episode 1431; 2 October 1974
- Created by: Tony Warren
- Introduced by: Tony Warren (1961); H.V. Kershaw (1962, 1969); Peter Eckersley (1966); Susi Hush (1974)
In-universe information
- Occupation: Machinist
- Father: Dick Birtles
- Mother: Marge Birtles
- Brothers: Raymond Birtles; Eric Birtles
- Husband: Neil Crossley (1966–present)
- Sons: Danny Crossley
- First cousins: Edwin Birtles

Sheila Birtles (also Crossley) is a fictional character from the British ITV soap opera Coronation Street. She was portrayed by actress Eileen Mayers. The character is known for her "controversial" suicide plot which was ultimately axed.

== Casting ==
Mayers left the series in 1963 and was asked to return for two episodes in 1969. In 1974, the actress returned to filming for another stint as Sheila.

Actress Eileen Mayers died on 27 June 2026, aged 94.

== Storylines ==
Through his many faults, Sheila falls hard for Neil Crossley (Geoffrey Matthews), so much so, that she does not see how badly he treated her. Neil only thinks of Sheila as a bit of fun, and after he stands her up on a date, she confronts him. Angered, Neil hits Sheila and leaves, leaving her devastated and she sinks into a deep depression. She pushes her friends away, and loses her job for not turning up. After she and Neil meet again, and he tells her in no uncertain terms that they are over, Sheila attempts suicide, but is found by Dennis Tanner (Philip Lowrie). On the doctor's recommendation, Sheila leaves Weatherfield, and moves in with her parents. Whilst there, Sheila discovers she is pregnant and gives birth to a baby boy in 1964, who she names Danny, before giving him up for adoption.

In 1966, Sheila is set up on a blind date by a friend, and is shocked to find her date is Jerry Booth (Graham Haberfield), who she went on an unsuccessful date with years ago. Sheila and Jerry reconnect, and Sheila returns to Weatherfield and moves in with Elsie Tanner (Pat Phoenix), securing a job at the new factory. Sheila and Jerry quickly fall in love, and intend to marry, but when Sheila bumps into Neil later that year, her feelings for him come rushing back, and Neil proposes. Jerry is heartbroken when Sheila leaves with Neil.

== Reception ==
After learning that Sheila's character was to commit suicide in 1963, the public was outraged. Instead, it was re-written and viewers saw the character take pills before the screen faded to black. Actress Eileen Mayers has claimed that "It was disappointing, it was good and it wasn't shown", referring to the suicide scenes. However, in 2011, the scenes were shown in the documentary The Corrie Years. Upon the announcement that the scenes were to air 50 years later, a Coronation Street insider told the Daily Mirror that "At the time it was deemed too controversial. But compared to what goes on in soaps these days, I don't think the scene will be very shocking." The character's suicide plot has been compared to that of Natasha Blakeman's in 2010 in the soap.
