= Ye Olde Rovers Return =

Former pub in Manchester, England (c. 1306–1958

- Ye Olde Rovers Return c. 1900

- Location within Greater Manchester

General information
- Type: Late medieval dwelling
- Architectural style: Vernacular architecture
- Location: 12 Shudehill, Manchester, England
- Coordinates: 53.484442°N 2.239458°W
- Completed: c. 1306; 720 years ago
- Demolished: 1958; 68 years ago

Technical details
- Structural system: Timber framing

Ye Olde Rovers Return was a public house in the Withy Grove area of Manchester, England, constructed in the early-14th century. Demolished in 1958, it was the inspiration for the fictional Rovers Return Inn featured in the long-running British soap opera Coronation Street, first broadcast in 1960.

== History ==
=== Construction ===
The original timber-framed building was completed in 1306, and formed part of the outbuildings of Withingreave Hall, a medieval mansion house that would later become the Manchester residence of the 17th-century philanthropist, William Hulme. Following his death in 1691, the inn — along with the adjacent numbers 10 (then used as a warehouse), 14 (a shop) and 16 (the Mosley Arms public house) — passed into the possession of Hulme's Charity, until sold at auction in October 1908.

At the time of its construction, Manchester was a small medieval market town, mostly consisting of arable land, and Withingreave Hall was built on a lane with a stream and a grove (or "greave") of willow trees ("withies") running along the opposite side, from which it took its earliest name, "Withy Greave."

=== Ale house ===
Although no records survive to establish when it first became an ale house, it was long claimed that it was the oldest pub in Manchester, a title also claimed by the nearby Seven Stars inn. The Seven Stars was completed in 1326, and first licensed in 1356, but appears to have been destroyed and rebuilt some time around 1500; the licensees of Ye Olde Rovers Return would boast that their pub had supplied the drinks "to the men who built the Seven Stars." It was also claimed that beer was sold there when the first stones of Manchester Cathedral were being laid in 1421, and "there the masons retired between whiles to refresh themselves with good home-brewed beer." Similarly, the first couple to be married in the cathedral celebrated their wedding breakfast at Ye Olde Rovers Return.

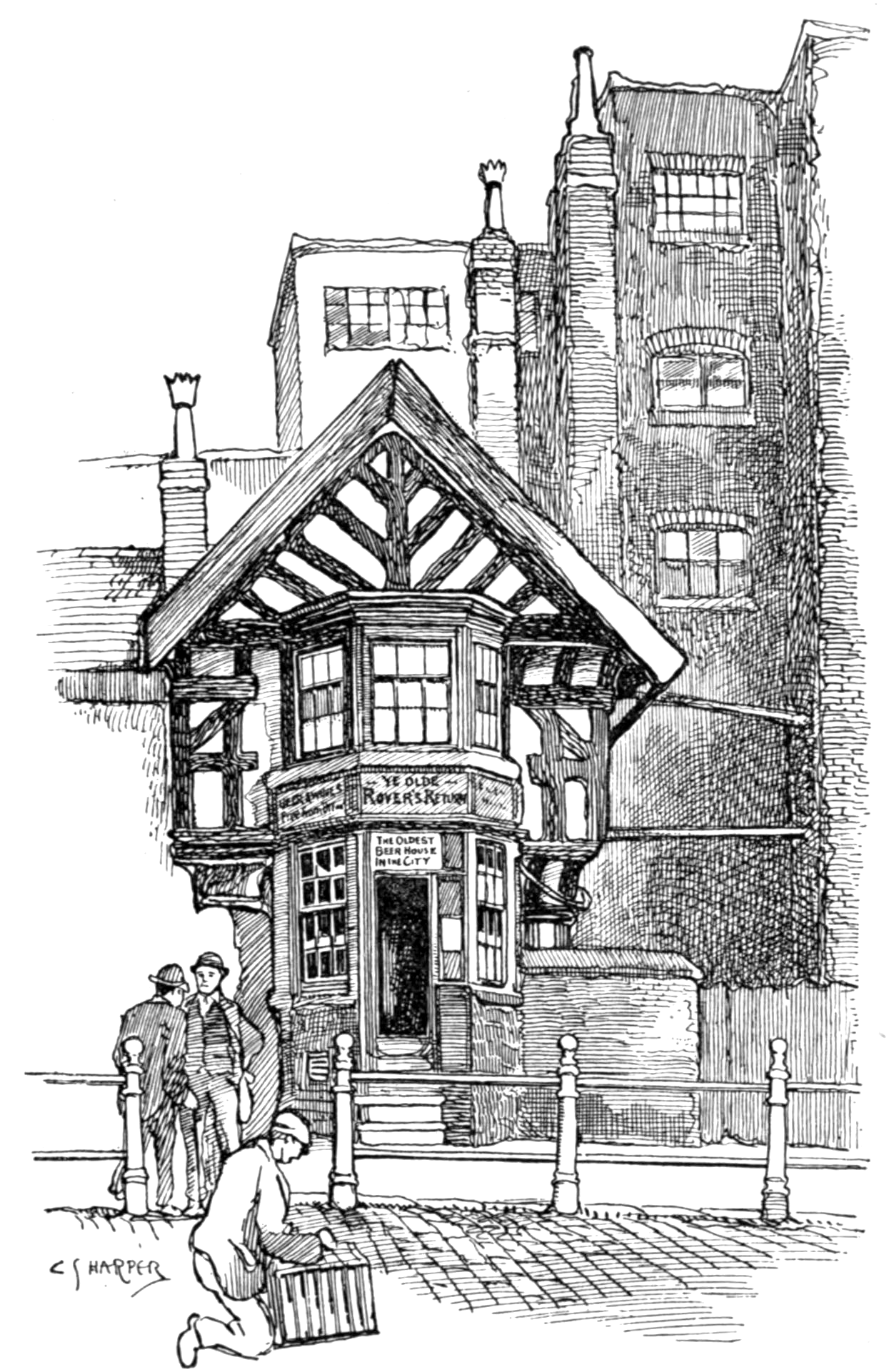
Ye Olde Rovers Return sketched by Charles George Harper for The Old Inns of Old England c. 1906

In October 1905, the pub was sketched by Frank Lewis Emanuel (1865–1948) as part of his series "Impressions of Manchester" for The Manchester Guardian (later collected and published as Manchester Sketches). His accompanying description reads:

The name of this quaint little inn suggests brine, the Spanish Main, and the roaring forties, yet its christening probably took place some two or three hundred years before Manchester became a seaport [...] The bowed front of the house lends it a good-natured, enticing appearance, and its little central flight of stone steps are no less than a cordial invitation to walk up and in. Doubtless the crowds who attend the teeming poultry market just outside do not fail to accept the invitation. Young by comparison, yet old and very worn, is the dingy factory that overtops the inn on two of its sides. It is buttressed like some tall cripple on crutches, and by no means interferes with the picturesqueness of the scene.

=== Closure ===
The Seven Stars ceased trading as a pub in June 1911, and Ye Olde Rovers Return surrendered its license in September 1923, leaving the Old Half Moon, first licensed in 1645, to lay claim to the title of the oldest licensed pub in the city. Ye Olde Rovers Return retained its name and subsequently operated as a bookshop and an antique shop. By 1946 it was under threat of demolition as part of Manchester and District Regional Planning Committee's "Manchester Plan" for redevelopment of the city. It was eventually demolished in 1958; its original site is now beneath the Arndale Centre, where construction began in 1975.

In 1960 it was the inspiration for the fictional Rovers Return Inn featured in the long-running British soap opera Coronation Street.
