= Neil Crossley =

Neil Crossley may refer to:

- Neil Crossley (Coronation Street), fictional character introduced in 1963
- Neil Crossley (EastEnders), fictional character introduced in 2016
- Neil Crossley, member of British rock band Half Man Half Biscuit
