= List of Coronation Street characters introduced in 1964 =

Coronation Street is a British soap opera, initially produced by Granada Television. Created by writer Tony Warren, Coronation Street first broadcast on ITV on 9 December 1960. The following is a list of characters introduced in the show's fifth year, by order of first appearance.

In what remains one of the serial's most dramatic and influential years to date, 1964 saw no less than four producers take the helm of the show. Apart from a short month-long break in which original producer Stuart Latham took over for one last stint, Margaret Morris presided over Coronation Street until May, in which she introduced Irma Ogden (Sandra Gough) in late January. Radical young producer Tim Aspinall took the reins in May and quickly made his mark by writing out several characters including Frank Barlow, Harry and Concepta Hewitt, Jerry and Myra Booth and most controversially, Martha Longhurst, a favourite with viewers who Aspinall chose to kill off in his first episode. A week later, Aspinall introduced a new regular in the form of Charlie Moffitt (Gordon Rollings).

In June, Aspinall chose to give newcomer Irma Ogden a family, and cast Bernard Youens and Jean Alexander in the roles of her parents Stan and Hilda. The couple remained with the series for the next twenty years. Hilda Ogden is considered an iconic character in Coronation Street's history. After a short, turbulent stint, Aspinall departed the show in September and H.V. Kershaw returned to the role. Kershaw introduced Sandra Petty (Heather Moore) in October, originally in a guest role. Barbara Mullaney also made her first appearance as Rita Littlewood for a single episode in December, eight years before returning as a regular cast member.

== Irma Barlow ==
Irma Barlow
- Coronation Street character
- Portrayed by: Sandra Gough
- Duration: 1964–1971
- First appearance: 27 January 1964; Episode 326
- Last appearance: 8 December 1971; Episode 1137
In-universe information
- Other names: Freda Ogden
- Father: Stan Ogden
- Mother: Hilda Ogden
- Brothers: Trevor Ogden; Tony Ogden
- Sisters: Sylvia Ogden
- Husband: David Barlow (1965–1970)
- Sons: Darren Barlow
- Grandfathers: Isaiah Ogden; Arnold Crabtree
- Grandmothers: Mary Ogden; Florence Crabtree
- Uncles: Norman Crabtree; Archie Crabtree
- Nephews: Damien Ogden
- Nieces: Jayne Ogden

Irma Barlow (also Freda Ogden) was played by Sandra Gough between 1964 and 1971. Having previously changed her name from Freda, Irma came to Weatherfield with the sole purpose to escape her family, with whom she did not get on. Just months after her arrival however, the rest of the Ogden family, Irma's mother Hilda, father Stan and brother Trevor, followed her and moved into number thirteen Coronation Street.

Irma struck up a relationship with local footballer David Barlow in 1965 and the pair get married in December that year. Following David's decision to cut short his footballing career after several setbacks, David and Irma went into business together, and bought the Corner Shop when it went up for sale in 1966. Settled in their new life, Irma and David try for a baby in 1967 but after a brief four-month pregnancy, Irma suffered a miscarriage. Broken hearted, she resigned herself to the fact she would never have children. Irma eventually grew tired of being a postmistress, and David eventually relaunched his football career. After David is signed to an Australian team, the Barlows moved to Australia in April 1968. Whilst there, Irma discovered she was pregnant again and gave birth to a son, Darren Barlow, in November 1968.

In 1970 the producers of Coronation Street decided to reintroduce the Barlows, but Alan Rothwell, the actor who played David, turned down the opportunity to return as he had found work elsewhere. Still keen to bring back Irma, the producers decided that instead of splitting the couple, David and two-year-old Darren were to be killed in a car crash off-screen. Upon arriving back on the Street, Irma was rehired at the Corner Shop by the new owner Maggie Cooke and shared the flat above, her former home, with barmaid Bet Lynch. Irma had a brief fling with Ray Langton in 1971. In December Irma left suddenly with the explanation that she was "going to stop with a friend for a bit". Irma never returned to Weatherfield and it was later revealed that she had contacted Maggie Clegg to buy her out of the shop and had moved to Llandudno in North Wales. She was believed to still be living there at the time of her parents' ruby wedding anniversary in 1983. She then emigrated to Canada and did not return for her father Stan's funeral in November 1984, much to the disappointment of her brother Trevor.

== Eddie Thomas ==
Eddie Thomas
- Coronation Street character
- Portrayed by: Douglas Austin
- Duration: 1964
- First appearance: 17 February 1964
- Last appearance: 18 March 1964
- Created by: Stuart Latham
- Introduced by: Tony Warren

Eddie Thomas was the young apprentice of Len Fairclough at the builder's yard. He dated 16-year-old Lucille Hewitt, but the teen romance did not last. Eddie also briefly dated Joyce Lennox. When a mistake by Len leads to elderly resident Minnie Caldwell falling through the banister on the stairs at the Viaduct, Minnie is persuaded to take action and sue Len. To pay compensation to Minnie, he is forced to make both Eddie and Jerry Booth redundant. Both men left Weatherfield soon after in search of work although Jerry later returned.

== Ted Ashley ==
Ted Ashley
- Coronation Street character
- Portrayed by: Jerold Wells
- Duration: 1964
- First appearance: 9 March 1964
- Last appearance: 18 March 1964
- Created by: Stuart Latham
- Introduced by: Adele Rose

Ted Ashley returned to his native Weatherfield after fifty years spent living in Australia. Martha Longhurst remembered her first love, and threw herself at him, only for Ted to turn her down. In truth, Ted had always loved Ena Sharples, but Ena was not interested. She stepped aside once again when she heard her friend Martha was hoping to marry him. Two months after Ted left, Martha died after suffering a heart attack.

== Gus Lowman ==
Gus Lowman
- Coronation Street character
- Portrayed by: Alister Williamson
- Duration: 1964
- First appearance: 25 March 1964
- Last appearance: 17 June 1964
- Created by: Margaret Morris
- Introduced by: Jack Rosenthal

Gus Lowman was introduced as the new manager of the Viaduct Sporting Club. On opening night, the ceiling collapsed and Len was blamed for shoddy workmanship, with Gus refusing to pay Len for his work. As it turned out, the collapse had been Gus' fault as he'd placed too much weight on the ceiling by using the upstairs as a liquor store, and Len was eventually paid.

== Rosemary Fraser ==
Rosemary Fraser
- Coronation Street character
- Portrayed by: Clare Owen
- Duration: 1964
- First appearance: 1 April 1964
- Last appearance: 8 April 1964
- Created by: Margaret Morris
- Introduced by: John Finch
In-universe information
- Spouse: Laurie Fraser

Rosemary Fraser was the wife of Laurie Fraser. Laurie had been seeing Elsie Tanner behind Rosemary's back, and he brazenly employed Elsie at the club where his wife was a regular customer. Elsie found out his betrayal and finished the relationship.

== Stuart Hodges ==
Stuart Hodges
- Coronation Street character
- Portrayed by: Vernon Joyner
- Duration: 1964–1965
- First appearance: 15 April 1964
- Last appearance: 20 January 1965
- Created by: Margaret Morris
- Introduced by: Peter Eckersley

Stuart Hodges took over the role of preacher at The Glad Tidings Mission Hall when Leonard Swindley was forced to take a rest after having a minor breakdown. Emily Nugent, a regular at the Mission, fell for Hodges as did most of the women. Even Ena Sharples took a liking to him when he helped her out with her cleaning job. Hodges left the Street to allow Swindley to take his job back, but returned months later with the news that the Mission was to merge with another in Weatherfield.

== Lily Haddon ==
Lily Haddon
- Coronation Street character
- Portrayed by: Stephanie Bidmead
- Duration: 1964
- First appearance: 18 May 1964; Episode 358
- Last appearance: 20 May 1964; Episode 359
- Created by: Tim Aspinall
- Introduced by: Peter Eckersley
In-universe information
- Father: Percy Longhurst
- Mother: Martha Longhurst
- Brothers: Harold Longhurst
- Husband: Wilf Haddon
- Daughters: Sandra Haddon; Pauline Haddon
- Grandfathers: Jack Hartley
- Grandmothers: Mary Hartley

Lily Haddon (also Longhurst) was the daughter of Rovers cleaner Martha Longhurst. Martha mentioned her frequently during her time on the show, and her absence became something of a running joke. Lily and her husband Wilf finally made their first and last appearances at Martha's funeral.

== Charlie Moffitt ==
Charlie Moffitt
- Coronation Street character
- Portrayed by: Gordon Rollings
- Duration: 1964–1965
- First appearance: 20 May 1964
- Last appearance: 15 December 1965
- Created by: Tim Aspinall
- Introduced by: John Finch

Charlie Moffitt moved into number 5 with dog Little Titch and his pigeons to lodge with Minnie Caldwell following the departure of Tickler Murphy. Charlie fancied himself as a comedian, and worked as so at the Viaduct Sporting Club. Charlie made enemies of the female residents when he organised a night of exotic dancers at the club, causing a lot of consternation for the men who visited. One of the exotic dancers had been a red-haired young lady called Rita Littlewood, who Dennis Tanner took home, though his hopes were dashed when she took to Elsie's bed instead.

The next year, Charlie quit showbusiness and borrowed £50 from Ena Sharples to invest in insurance. However, when he lost half of the money, he left the area fearing the sack. The lost money was in fact in the hands of Hilda Ogden, who'd found it and had spent it. When she learnt that the money was Charlie's she returned the goods she'd bought and set about on returning the money. About a month later Charlie was eventually tracked down to a working men's club, and was persuaded to return home. He left the Street once again at the end of the year for a season in pantomime and never returned.

== Pip Mistral ==
Pip Mistral
- Coronation Street character
- Portrayed by: Elaine Stevens
- Duration: 1964
- First appearance: 1 June 1964
- Last appearance: 3 June 1964
- Created by: Tim Aspinall
- Introduced by: Peter Eckersley

Pip Mistral was an exotic dancer who meets Charlie Moffitt and asks him to a party. Charlie invited his friends by her request, so Ken Barlow, Harry Hewitt and Len Fairclough join them. To Ken's surprise, he soon finds himself immersed in conversation with Pip and they talk all night. Ken tells Pip she is wasted as a dancer, and that he would like to see her again, but Pip senses what he is alluding to and rejects his advances. Ken's wife Valerie finds out the next day, and is deeply hurt that he connected with someone on such a deep level. She claimed she'd rather he'd have kissed her.

== Trevor Ogden ==
Trevor Ogden
- Coronation Street character
- Portrayed by: Jonathan Collins (1964); Don Hawkins (1973–1984)
- Duration: 1964, 1973, 1975, 1983–1984
- First appearance: 6 July 1964
- Last appearance: 28 November 1984
- Created by: Tim Aspinall
- Introduced by: Tony Warren
In-universe information
- Other names: Dudley Ogden
- Father: Stan Ogden
- Mother: Hilda Ogden
- Brothers: Tony Ogden
- Sisters: Irma Barlow; Sylvia Ogden
- Wife: Pauline Watson
- Sons: Damian Ogden
- Daughters: Jayne Ogden
- Grandfathers: Isaiah Ogden; Arnold Crabtree
- Grandmothers: Mary Ogden; Florence Crabtree
- Uncles: Archie Crabtree; Norman Crabtree
- Nephews: Darren Barlow

Trevor (also Dudley) Ogden was the son of Stan and Hilda Ogden. He arrived with his family in 1964, but when the Street residents took cover in the Mission hall basement during a bomb scare, 15-year-old Trevor took his opportunity to raid the houses and left for London with the stolen goods. He was still in London in 1967, where he called his father to tell him that Hilda - who was missing after having a nervous breakdown - was not with him.

Six years later, Stan and Hilda tracked Trevor down to Chesterfield where he was living with his wife and son. Trevor was horrified to see them, as he had told his wife Polly that his parents had died in a car crash. The family patched up their differences and the Ogdens went home. Their son, Damian was born in 1973. Polly and Trevor lived in a detached house in Chesterfield, far removed from the working class community Trevor ran away from when he was fifteen. Stan and Hilda were thrilled to learn that they were grandparents again (their first grandchild, Darren Barlow, was killed in a road accident in 1970). Subsequently, Stan and Hilda were only contacted when the younger Ogdens wanted something, such as in December 1975 when Hilda was called on to look after Trevor and Damian while a heavily pregnant Polly was in hospital with toxaemia. A month later, Damian's younger sister Jayne was born.

Trevor made three visits to Weatherfield, making his last appearance in November 1984 when he attended his father's funeral, expressing his disappointment that his sister Irma (by then living in Canada) had not made the effort to attend. After making sure his mother was OK, Trevor got in his car and drove home.

== David Graham ==
David Graham
- Coronation Street character
- Portrayed by: Roger Adamson
- Duration: 1964
- First appearance: 3 August 1964
- Last appearance: 26 August 1964
- Created by: Tim Aspinall
- Introduced by: John Pennington

David Graham was an art teacher at a School of Design where Elsie Tanner took an evening job as a life model. David became infatuated with Elsie, but the affair was brief when his intensity proved too much for Elsie. When she attempted to end their relationship, David produced a gun and threatened to kill her. Before he could do anything, however, Elsie's son Dennis arrived and stopped him and Elsie resigned from her job.

== Tickler Murphy ==
Tickler Murphy
- Coronation Street character
- Portrayed by: Patrick McAlinney
- Duration: 1964
- First appearance: 14 September 1964
- Last appearance: 7 October 1964
- Created by: Tim Aspinall
- Introduced by: Tony Williamson

"Tickler" Murphy was a man who Minnie Caldwell took in as lodger. Irish Tickler swept shopkeeper Florrie Lindley off her feet, and the pair enjoyed a short romance until Florrie began speaking of marriage and the future. Tickler ended the relationship, and fled the country, leaving Florrie alone once again.

== Sandra Petty ==
Sandra Petty
- Coronation Street character
- Portrayed by: Heather Moore
- Duration: 1964–1965
- First appearance: 2 November 1964
- Last appearance: 1 December 1965
- Created by: H.V. Kershaw
- Introduced by: John Finch (1964); Jack Rosenthal (1965)
In-universe information
- Father: Lionel Petty
- Mother: Mary Petty

Sandra Petty was the daughter of shopkeeper Lionel Petty, who she followed to Weatherfield when he bought the Corner Shop. Soon after her arrival, Emily Nugent gave her a job at Gamma Garments and she met Dennis Tanner. Sandra and Dennis began a relationship which lasted for months until Sandra grew annoyed by the way in which Dennis treated her like a sister rather than a girlfriend. She split up with him, resigned from her job, moved into a new flat and left the Street.

== Sgt. Bowden ==
Sgt. Bowden
- Coronation Street character
- Portrayed by: James Beck
- Duration: 1964–1967
- First appearance: 9 November 1964
- Last appearance: 28 August 1967
- Created by: H.V. Kershaw
- Introduced by: Harry Driver and Vince Powell

Sgt Bowden, played by actor James Beck (later known for his role in Dad's Army), was the local police officer in charge of Weatherfield district who appeared intermittently between 1964 and 1967. He is first seen when, after taking his new post, he introduces himself to the local residents and fines Jack Walker for serving drinks in the Rovers Return pub after hours. In all, he made 8 appearances on the programme. His last appearance came when he caught Steve Tanner, Len Fairclough and Albert Tatlock gambling, but rather than take action, he joined in the game.

== Alf Chadwick ==
Alf Chadwick
- Coronation Street character
- Portrayed by: Eddie King
- Duration: 1964–1965, 1968
- First appearance: 9 November 1964
- Last appearance: 23 December 1968
- Created by: H.V. Kershaw
- Introduced by: Harry Driver and Vince Powell

Alf Chadwick was employed to play piano in the Rovers when the Walkers got a new license. Alf appeared infrequently for the next year and played piano for the Coronation Street pantomimes in both 1964 and 1968, when regular pianist Ena Sharples was otherwise engaged.

== William Piggott ==
William Piggott
- Coronation Street character
- Portrayed by: George A. Cooper
- Duration: 1964–1965, 1970–1971
- First appearance: 9 December 1964
- Last appearance: 3 November 1971
- Created by: H.V. Kershaw
- Introduced by: Tony Warren
In-universe information
- Sons: Brian Piggott

William Piggott was the father of a pupil at the Weatherfield high school where Ken Barlow had recently taken a job. In a bribe, William offered Ken £100 to ensure his son passed an exam. Ken considered the opportunity, needing the money, but his morals were too strong and he publicly returned the money to William and called the police. Valerie stated afterwards that it was a shame he did so, the money would have been helpful as she was pregnant with twins.

== Others ==
Character	Date(s)	Episode(s)	Actor	Circumstances
Jennifer Knott	13–15 January	322–323	Sarah Aimson	Member of the Brett Falcon fan club, of which Lucille Hewitt is president. Jennifer makes Lucille furious by posing for a photograph as the President of the fan club which goes in the Weatherfield Gazette. Together the girls also make an enemy of Ena Sharples when they scrawl "I love Brett" on the vestry.
Cheryl	13 January	322	Jackie Lenya	A group of Brett Falcon fans who gather outside number eleven.
First fan	13 January	322	Heather Spratt	A group of Brett Falcon fans who gather outside number eleven.
Second fan	13 January	322	Valerie Duffey	A group of Brett Falcon fans who gather outside number eleven.
Norma	13 January	322	Shirley Stelfox	
Tony Leonard	27 January	326	David Glover	
Joyce Lennox	27 January – 18 March	326–341	Yvonne Walsh	Machinist at Elliston's Raincoat Factory who briefly dates Len Fairclough. Len's friends believe that Joyce, who is much younger, is only after his money. Soon enough however Joyce becomes uninterested and stands him up to go out with Eddie Thomas instead. She later leaves Coronation Street to work at Laurie Fraser's club.
Mavis	27 January; 23 March	326; 342	Frances Brozel	
Wilf Haddon	18–20 May	358–359	Henry Livings	Husband of Lily Haddon and son-in-law of the recently deceased Martha Longhurst. Wilf and Lily arrive in the Street for Martha's funeral; however, Ena Sharples rows with Lily when she pretends to be upset, and the two leave the Street soon after. Martha was immensely proud of Wilf and Lily, but Wilf earned all his money by working nights. Wilf and Lily had a daughter, Sandra.
