= Society of Graphic Fine Art =

British art organisation founded in 1919

The Society of Graphic Fine Art (known until 1988 as the Society of Graphic Art) is a British arts organisation dedicated to drawing in all of its forms, established in 1919.

== History ==
The Society of Graphic Art was founded in 1919 by Frank Lewis Emanuel, whose idea it was, in collaboration with Frank Brangwyn. Brangwyn was appointed President, and Emanuel Honorary Secretary. The society held an annual exhibition in the Royal Institute Galleries between 1921 and 1940.

According to an art journal in 1921, "The foundation of a body to protect the existence of draughtsmanship was never more needed than at the present time." The editorial welcomed the formation of the SGA, as part of "a renascent school of thought", and praised the inaugural exhibition, held at the RBA Galleries in London on 1–29 January, 1921.

Over the years the "black and white" Society adopted the use of colour and broadened the range of techniques employed by its artists. The name changed to Society of Graphic Fine Art in 1988.
