= Lynne Carol =

British actress (1914–1990)

- Born: Josephine Caroline Gertrude Mary Faith Harber; 29 June 1914; Usk, Monmouthshire, Wales
- Died: 30 June 1990 (aged 76); Blackpool, Lancashire, England
- Occupation: Actress
- Years active: 1917–1980
- Spouse: Bert Palmer (m. 1934; died 1980)
- Children: 3

Josephine Caroline Gertrude Mary Faith Harber (29 June 1914 – 30 June 1990), known by the stage name Lynne Carol, was a Welsh born actress, primarily in TV series and telemovies. She was best known for playing busybody Martha Longhurst in the soap opera Coronation Street from the second episode in 1960 until the character was killed off in 1964.

== Biography ==
=== Early life ===
A descendant of six generations of actors, Lynne Carol (also known as Josephine Palmer) was born in Monmouthshire, south east Wales, where her actor parents Charles Harber and Mina Harber (née McKinnon) were touring in a stage play. Carol started her own acting career at age three. Before landing the part of Martha Longhurst, Carol worked in the provincial theatre for many years.

=== Career ===
Carol, although only 46 years old at the time, played Martha Longhurst as a waspish beldam many years her senior, who first appeared in December 1960; with Ena Sharples, played by Violet Carson and Minnie Caldwell, played by Margot Bryant she made up the formidable trio that held court in the snug of local public house, the Rovers Return. The verbal interplay between the three epitomised the serial's North of England humanity and yielded some of the 'richest moments' in the programme. The renown of Martha Longhurst became such that Carol's unpublicised visit to the Ideal Home Exhibition caused a near riot. She was advised to leave the premises for her own safety.

After only three years in the series, the character of Martha Longhurst was axed by a new producer, who assumed that Carol would be likely to find other acting jobs. Carol was deeply shocked to read in the newspaper that the days of her character were now numbered. Martha died quietly of a heart attack in the snug (one of the three bars in the Rovers, the others being the public and the select) of the public house in May 1964. The subsequent burial took place in the Manchester General Cemetery where a special grave had been prepared. Carol remained bitter about Martha's death and believed to the end that a terrible mistake had been made, as her character was so popular. Viewers responded by complaining in their thousands and later the writers acknowledged that they had made a mistake.

Carol later appeared in the short-lived BBC serial The Newcomers, alongside Alan Browning, who later appeared in Coronation Street as Alan Howard. She also appeared in the 1979 film Yanks starring Richard Gere.

== Personal life ==
Carol married Herbert (Bert) Newell Palmer in 1934 in Bideford, Devon. Palmer, born 22 April 1900, was a character actor from Easingwold, Yorkshire, who appeared in numerous television roles, including two episodes of Coronation Street and the pilot episode of its first spin-off, Pardon the Expression. The couple made their home in Blackpool, had two sons and a daughter, and remained married until Palmer's death on 15 January 1980, aged 79. Her eldest son, Michael, was killed in an R.A.F. parachutists' air crash disaster at Abingdon, on 7 July 1965.

In April 1990, it was reported that Carol had died in a nursing home in Lytham St Annes, following a hoax telephone call received by Granada Television, while she was visiting her family in Düsseldorf, Germany.

Carol suffered from angina, being hospitalised in May 1990. She died of a heart attack in hospital in Blackpool on 30 June 1990, aged 76.

== Filmography ==
year	title	role
1960–1964	Coronation Street (TV series)	Martha Longhurst
1965	San Ferry Ann	Grandma
1966	The Newcomers (TV series)	Mrs Tyser
1967	Those Two Sellers (TV series)	
1967	The Fellows (TV series)	
1968	The Gamblers (TV series)	Auntie Maggie
1968	Champion House (TV series)	Mrs Birley
1968	The War of Darkie Pilbeam (TV series)	Mrs Cloth
1971	Hadleigh (TV series)	Mrs Morley
1972	ITV Summer Night Theatre (series)	Woman with Dog
1969–1972	Albert! (TV series)	Bessie/Alice Hoddinot
1972	Nearest and Dearest (TV series)	Mrs Butterworth
1972–1973	Z-Cars (TV series)	Florence Marsden/Mrs. Tain
1975	Crown Court (TV series)	Gladys Wellbeloved
1975	Nightingale's Boys (TV series)	Mrs Fryer
1975	Sadie, It's Cold Outside (TV series)	Mrs Bellamy
1976	Bill Brand (miniseries)	Elsie Wright
1976	Angels (TV series)	Mrs McKinney
1977	The Heavy Mob (TV movie)	Old Lady
1978	Me! I'm Afraid of Virginia Woolf (TV movie)	
1979	All Day on the Sands (TV movie)	Mrs Thornton
1979	House of Caradus (TV series)	Old Woman
1979	Yanks	Annie
1980	BBC Playhouse (TV series)	Mrs Russell
