= Frank Lewis Emanuel =

British artist (1865–1948)

Frank Lewis Emanuel (usually signing as Frank L. Emanuel) (15 September 1865 – 7 May 1948), was a British painter, etcher, teacher and writer.

He was born in Bayswater, London, on 15 September 1865. In his early years, he assisted to University College School, London. Later he studied under Alphonse Legros, at the Slade School of Fine Art, and under William-Adolphe Bouguereau and Tony Robert-Fleury at the Académie Julian in Paris. He was a founder and Honorary Secretary of the Society of Graphic Art (SGA), an examiner for the Royal Drawing Society, and a member of the Art Workers' Guild and the Society of Marine Artists. He taught etching at the Central School of Arts & Crafts between 1918 and 1930, and was the author of 'Etching and Etchings: a guide to the technique and to print collection', Pitman, 1930.

His work was often exhibited in several main galleries, including the Royal Academy (almost annually for over forty years), the Paris Salon, and in different countries like Australia, Germany, Holland, Japan, or the US, and was further popularized by his publication as postcards by the well-known firm Raphael Tuck & Sons. He died on 7 May 1948 at St Charles' Hospital, London.

Among other museums, his work can be found in the Tate Gallery, the Metropolitan Museum of Art, the Ashmolean Museum, Oxford, Hastings Museum and Art Gallery, the Imperial War Museum, Guildhall Library and the Victoria and Albert Museum.
