= Sandra Gough =

English actress

- Born: 2 August 1943 (age 82); Manchester, England
- Occupation: Actress

Sandra Gough (born 2 August 1943) is an English actress, best known for her role as Irma Ogden in the soap opera Coronation Street, which she played from 1964 to 1971.

Other roles have included Nellie Dingle in the soap opera Emmerdale in 1995, her second role in the soap as she played Doreen Shuttleworth in 1985. She also starred as the mother of layabout Paul Calf (Steve Coogan) in The Paul & Pauline Calf's Video Diaries, and later Coogan's Run.

== Filmography ==
Year	Title	Role	Notes
1963	ITV Television Playhouse	Girl in Pharmacy	
1963	Coronation Street	Marjorie Platt	2 episodes
1964–1971	Coronation Street	Irma Ogden (later Barlow)	Series regular, 398 episodes
1969	All Star Comedy Carnival	Irma Ogden (later Barlow)	
1974	It's Magic		
1977	Moynihan		2 episodes
1983	Bingo!	Kay	TV movie
1983	The Dresser	Actress on Station	
1984	Foxy Lady	Rene Watson	2 episodes
1984	Call Earnshaw	Rose	TV movie
1984–1985, 1989, 1991	Emmerdale	Doreen Shuttleworth	Recurring role, 24 episodes
1985	Travelling Man	Ruby	
1986	Hideaway	Woman at Bar	
1987	Screen Two	Mrs. Hilton	
1988	All Creatures Great and Small	Mrs. Bell	
1988	How to be Cool	Sylvianne	2 episodes
1989	The Play on One	Housing officer	
1989	4 Play	Mrs. Brickton	
1990	Medics	Mrs. Grundig	
1992	Screenplay	Rita/Vox Pop	2 episodes
1993	Roy Chubby Brown: Exposed	Housewife 2	Video release
1993	Paul Calf's Video Diary	Mum	TV short
1994	Cracker	Second woman	
1994	The Wanderer	Fortune teller	
1994	Pauline Calf's Wedding Video	Mum	TV short
1995	Coogan's Run	Mum	
1995	Emmerdale	Nellie Dingle	Series regular, 76 episodes
1999	City Central	Irene Caplett	
2000	Fat Friends	Mrs. Chadwick	2 episodes
2000	The Van Boys	Mother	Video release
2001	Vacuuming Completely Nude in Paradise	The Spaniard	TV movie
