= List of Coronation Street characters introduced in 1962 =

Coronation Street is a British soap opera, initially produced by Granada Television. Created by writer Tony Warren, Coronation Street first broadcast on ITV on 9 December 1960. The following is a list of characters introduced in the show's third year, by order of first appearance.

For the majority of the first half of 1962, Coronation Street was caught up in the midst of a strike by the actors' union Equity, which began in November 1961 and meant members could not sign new contracts for the duration. As a result, the show was forced to rely on just fourteen regular cast members for five months, as those actors had previously signed year-long contracts, a rarity in television at the time. The strike caused regulars such as Emily Nugent (Eileen Derbyshire), Leonard Swindley (Arthur Lowe) and, later, Dennis Tanner (Philip Lowrie) to disappear from screens and no new characters were introduced until the strike ended in April.

Series producer Derek Granger departed the show in April, and was replaced by H.V. Kershaw in his first of eight separate stints in the role over the next ten years. With the strike over, most of the cast lost at the end of 1961 returned to their respective roles, and in July Kershaw introduced kind-hearted young builder Jerry Booth, played by Graham Haberfield. Jerry would become a major character for the next thirteen years until Haberfield's sudden death in 1975. August saw the Street's second birth as Christopher Hewitt was born to parents Concepta and Harry, and long-term recurring character Dave Smith made his first appearance in September.

== Philippa Scopes ==
Philippa Scopes
- Coronation Street character
- Portrayed by: Jacqueline Jones
- Duration: 1962
- First appearance: 14 May 1962; Episode 148
- Last appearance: 30 May 1962; Episode 153
- Created by: Harry Driver
- Introduced by: H.V. Kershaw

Philippa Scopes is the glamorous girlfriend of Billy Walker. Billy's mother Annie takes an instant dislike to the leggy blonde, and her presence certainly catches the eye of many of the male regulars. An aspiring actress, Philippa refuses to give up her luxurious lifestyle for Billy, and ends the relationship before heading back to London.

== Colin Appleby ==
Colin Appleby
- Coronation Street character
- Portrayed by: Lawrence James
- First appearance: 13 June 1962; Episode 157
- Last appearance: 20 June 1962; Episode 159
- Created by: Harry Driver
- Introduced by: H.V. Kershaw
In-universe information
- Father: Edward Appleby
- Wife: Christine Hardman (1962)

Colin Appleby is introduced in June as an old boyfriend of Christine Hardman's whom she bumped into while on a night out with Sheila Birtles. The chance encounter leads to a whirlwind romance and Colin and Christine are wed only days later on 20 June 1962. They leave for London that night, but in October Christine returns alone — Colin having sadly been killed in a car accident, leaving her a widow in only her twenties.

== Phyllis Gregory ==
Phyllis Gregory
- Coronation Street character
- Portrayed by: Mary Quinn
- Duration: 1962
- Appears on: 11 July 1962; Episode 165
- Created by: Harry Driver
- Introduced by: H.V. Kershaw
In-universe information
- Husband: Bill Gregory

Phyllis Gregory is married to Bill Gregory who appeared seeking a reconciliation with him, causing complications for Bill and his lover Elsie Tanner. Bill was forced to choose between the two women, and he waited for a sign from Elsie to tell him to end his marriage. When none came, Bill agreed to try again with Phyllis and they left the Street together. By 1970, Phyllis had died, and although it took them 22 years, Bill and Elsie did end up together.

== Jerry Booth ==
Jerry Booth
- Coronation Street character
- Portrayed by: Graham Haberfield
- Duration: 1962–1968, 1971–1975
- First appearance: 23 July 1962; Episode 168
- Last appearance: 29 October 1975; Episode 1543
- Created by: Harry Driver
- Introduced by: H.V. Kershaw
In-universe information
- Occupation: Builder
- Father: Ernest Booth
- Mother: Nellie Booth
- Wife: Myra Dickenson (1963–68)
- Uncles: Sam Leach
- Aunts: Maureen Leach

Gerald William "Jerry" Booth is played by Graham Haberfield. Jerry is introduced in July 1962 as Len Fairclough's new apprentice at the builder's yard, and the men soon become firm friends. Initially, Jerry pursues and falls for Sheila Birtles but Sheila becomes infatuated with her new boss Neil Crossley the next year and forgets about Jerry. Although they briefly split, Neil and Sheila later go on to marry after leaving the street.

Jerry meets Myra Dickenson in 1963. Not long after getting together, Myra pushes Jerry into proposing and Jerry went along with her plans. Jerry and Myra marry in October 1963, only a couple of months after meeting, and move into number thirteen after their honeymoon. However, with Myra playing housewife and overspending on luxuries, they find they can not survive on just Jerry's income and the bills start to pile up. The message eventually reached Myra of the trouble they were in and she broke down. Myra organised with her parents that the couple would move in with them until they can sort out their finances. The Booths left Weatherfield in May 1964.

Jerry returns in February 1965, having split from Myra. He revealed that Myra was pregnant when they left but their baby girl was stillborn and the devastation drove them apart. In 1966, Jerry almost finds happiness again when former flame Sheila returns to the area but is put off when he learns of Sheila and Neil's life together and of their son Danny. In 1968, Myra returns in hope of a reconciliation but Jerry is adamant he has moved on, and continues divorce proceedings as Myra returns to her parents'. Jerry eventually becomes a partner in Len's building company but ends the partnership when he unexpectedly left for a fresh start after being best man at Dennis Tanner's wedding. Jerry returns in 1971 and Len offers him his old job back. Jerry eventually moves in with Len and Ray Langton to help keep the house in order.

In 1972 Jerry, together with Ray Langton and Fred Gee, appeared in a spin off from Coronation Street entitled Rest Assured. The premise of the series was to follow the comic misfortunes of Street characters Jerry Booth and Ray Langton and in the role of insurance salesmen and premium collectors. Part of their customer round is in Norville House, a block of flats in Weatherfield.

However the series only got as far as the recording of a half-hour pilot episode under the title Lift Off.

Mavis Riley enters Jerry's life in 1973, and they become good friends. Jerry and Mavis develop feelings for each other but they are both too shy to admit it and the timing is never quite right. The blossoming romance comes to an abrupt end when tragedy strikes. Jerry dies suddenly of a heart attack in November 1975 aged just thirty-four, due to the real-life sudden death of actor Graham Haberfield, who had played Jerry for thirteen years. Jerry's friends and neighbours are left in a state of shock and sadness.

== Sam Leach ==
Sam Leach
- Coronation Street character
- Portrayed by: Frank Atkinson
- Duration: 1962
- First appearance: 6 August 1962; Episode 172
- Last appearance: 5 September 1962; Episode 181
- Created by: Harry Driver
- Introduced by: H.V. Kershaw
In-universe information
- Sisters: Nellie Booth
- Wife: Maureen Leach
- Nephews: Jerry Booth

Sam Leach is Jerry Booth's uncle who turns up from Newcastle, and soon gets a job as potman in the Rovers. Jack provides him with a bed at the Rovers, but Sam's appearance puzzles Jerry who wonders why he's left his aunt. He impresses the locals with his acts of charity until the police turn up looking for him. The locals speculate on the reasons why, believing he may have killed his wife Maureen. In fact he is only wanted for deserting her, and returns home.

== Christopher Hewitt ==
Christopher Hewitt
- Coronation Street character
- Portrayed by: Stephen Ward
- Duration: 1962–1964
- First appearance: 6 August 1962; Episode 172
- Last appearance: 19 August 1964; Episode 385
- Created by: Harry Driver
- Introduced by: H.V. Kershaw
- Book appearances: Coronation Street: The Complete Saga
In-universe information
- Father: Harry Hewitt
- Mother: Concepta Hewitt
- Half-sisters: Lucille Hewitt

Christopher Hewitt is the child born to Harry and Concepta Hewitt in 1962, played by child actor Stephen Ward. His mother's pregnancy causes a stir in the Street as most believe Concepta, at 34 years of age, is too old to have a baby. However, his birth comes as a joy to everyone. To mark the Hewitt's first wedding anniversary, they throw a party in the Rovers to celebrate but the celebrations are cut short when Christopher is abducted from outside Swindley's shop. Three days later Elsie Tanner bumps into one of her daughter Linda's school friends Joan Akers and was surprised to find her with a baby. Recognizing the child as Christopher, Elsie rings the police. Joan is arrested and Christopher is returned safely. The Hewitt family, minus Lucille, leave the Street in 1964.

== Dave Smith ==
Dave Smith
- Coronation Street character
- Portrayed by: Reginald Marsh
- Duration: 1962, 1966–1971, 1976
- First appearance: 17 September 1962; Episode 184
- Last appearance: 28 January 1976; Episode 1569
- Created by: Harry Driver
- Introduced by: H.V. Kershaw (1962, 1967, 1969, 1970); Peter Eckersley (1966); Richard Doubleday (1968); John Finch (1969); Leslie Duxbury (1971); Susi Hush (1976)
In-universe information
- Wife: Lillian Smith

Dave Smith is a bookmaker and small-town businessman played by actor Reginald Marsh on a recurring basis between 1962 and 1976. Dave is introduced as owner of the local bookies when he appears for two episodes in September 1962. Dave is immediately interested in Elsie Tanner and he invites her to go on holiday with him. Elsie returns a couple of weeks later, having got bored of Dave's company.

Dave returned in 1966 and made sporadic appearances for the next ten years. He made his final appearance in 1976, leaving Weatherfield to go to Kenilworth with Blanche Hunt, an old flame to run a country club.

== Joan Akers ==
Joan Akers
- Coronation Street character
- Portrayed by: Anna Cropper
- Duration: 1962
- First appearance: 1 October 1962; Episode 188
- Last appearance: 10 October 1962; Episode 191
- Created by: Harry Driver
- Introduced by: H.V. Kershaw

Joan Akers was a school friend of Linda Cheveski's who abducted Christopher Hewitt. Joan's baby died a year before and after Christopher was returned to his mother, she begged her forgiveness but Concepta refused.

== Susan Schofield ==
Susan Schofield
- Coronation Street character
- Portrayed by: Ann Mitton
- Duration: 1962
- First appearance: 5 November 1962; Episode 198
- Last appearance: 14 November 1962; Episode 201
- Created by: Harry Driver
- Introduced by: H.V. Kershaw
In-universe information
- Father: Jim Schofield
- Mother: May Schofield

Susan Schofield was a pupil of Bessie Street School where Albert Tatlock served as a lollipop man. Albert grew concerned with Susan when he noticed she was frequently covered in bruises, and befriended her. When asked about her home life, Susan broke down and admitted that her father was violent. Following a visit to Susan's house by Albert, her father Jim threatened him, but Albert refused to back down. With the support of the men of Coronation Street, they made their own threat to Jim to call the police if the violence continued. Two years later, in 1964, Susan was knocked down and killed by a lorry on Rosamund Street.

== Others ==
Character	Date(s)	Episode(s)	Actor	Circumstances
Billy Makin	30 April – 2 May	144–145	Jimmy Ogden	A young boy who was meeting with his gang of friends in the empty number nine, until he is caught by Len Fairclough.
Matilda Grimshaw	28–30 May	152–153	Marion Dawson	A lady from another 'Coronation Street' in Weatherfield, who comes to defend her street when she hears seven of the eight streets in the area are to be renamed. Matilda starts an argument with Ena Sharples when she tells her that her street is the one to remain, to which Ena refuses to back down. Matilda eventually leaves having lost the argument, and Ena is applauded by her friends and neighbours.
Geoffrey Simpson	6 August; 5 November	172; 198	Stephen Cartwright	An old friend of Ken Barlow's, they bump into each other while out and bore Ken's wife Val rigid as they talk for so long about subjects she does not understand. Ken invites Geoffrey and his girlfriend Sandra to dinner a few months later. Val is again stuck for anything to say.
Ted Young	15 August	175	Eric Nicholson	A neighbour of Sam Leach's from Newcastle. He starts the locals speculating about Sam's situation at home when he reveals that Sam's wife is a nag, joking that perhaps Sam killed her.
DS Swann	22 August	177	Gordon Fairclough	A policeman who comes looking for Sam Leach when his wife Maureen reports him as missing.
Woman	12 September	183	Kitty Attwood	An unnamed regular at the Flying Horse.
PC Rose	3 October – 19 November	189–202	Stanley Walsh	A policeman who discovered Christopher Hewitt empty pram abandoned by Joan Akers. He also investigated the theft of Jerry Booth's wash basins, which he bought in bulk.
Mrs Webb	8–10 October	190–191	Jean Alexander	Joan Akers's landlady, who answered questions from police when Joan was suspected of abducting Christopher Hewitt.
Mr Spinks	29 October – 28 November	196–205	Stephen Hancock	Leonard Swindley's agent when he runs for the local council elections. Mr Spinks helps Swindley canvas for votes, but Swindley ultimately loses.
Edward Appleby	29–31 October	196–197	Fred Ferris	Colin Appleby's father, who comes to Weatherfield to try to convince his daughter-in-law Christine Appleby to return with them to live. A dejected Christine refuses, and Mr Appleby has to explain to her friends and neighbours why she has come back — Colin is dead.
Heckler	31 October	197	Reg Passingham	A heckler at a pre-election meeting held by Leonard Swindley and Mr Spinks.
Sandra	5 November	198	Anne Lloyd	The girlfriend of Geoffrey Simpson, whom he took to dinner at the Barlows.
Workman	12 November	200	Geoffrey Reed	A workman hired to dig up the street to lay a telephone cable.
Jim Schofield	12–14 November	200–201	Richard Butler	Alcoholic father of Susan Schofield, who Albert Tatlock discovered had been beating her. Albert warned Jim off, and the violence stopped.
May Schofield	12–14 November	200–201	Margery Mason	Wife of Jim Schofield and mother to Susan.
Tom Russell	3 December	206	Geoffrey Brightman	
Marge Birtles	3–5 December; 28 January 1963	206–207; 222	Sheila Raynor	Parents of Sheila Birtles, they come to Weatherfield to ask Sheila to return with them.
Dick Birtles	5 December; 28 January 1963	207; 222	John Comer	Parents of Sheila Birtles, they come to Weatherfield to ask Sheila to return with them.
