= Dennis Tanner =

Fictional character from Coronation Street

- Coronation Street character
- Portrayed by: Philip Lowrie
- Duration: 1960–1968, 2011–2014
- First appearance: Episode 1; 9 December 1960
- Last appearance: Episode 8437; 30 July 2014
- Created by: Tony Warren
- Introduced by: Stuart Latham (1960); H.V. Kershaw (1963); Phil Collinson (2011)
- Book appearances: Coronation Street: The Complete Saga; Coronation Street: The War Years
- Spin-off appearances: Coronation Street: Text Santa Special (2012)
- Dennis in the 1960s
In-universe information
- Occupation: Talent agent; Salesman; Newsagent assistant
- Father: Arnold Tanner
- Mother: Elsie Tanner
- Stepfather: Steve Tanner; Alan Howard; Bill Gregory
- Stepmother: Norah Tanner
- Sisters: Linda Cheveski
- Wife: Jenny Sutton; Rita Sullivan (2012–2015)
- Grandfathers: Wally Tanner; Arthur Grimshaw
- Grandmothers: Amy Tanner; Alice Grimshaw
- Uncles: Albert Tanner; Jack Grimshaw
- Aunts: Phyllis Bailey; Fay Butler; Ethel Grimshaw; Connie Grimshaw; Iris Grimshaw; Freda Grimshaw; Nancy Grimshaw; Polly Grimshaw
- Nephews: Paul Cheveski; Martin Cheveski
- First cousins: Gary Bailey; Bernard Butler; Sandra Butler
- Other relatives: Arnley Grimshaw; Colin Grimshaw; Eileen Grimshaw; Julie Carp; Jason Grimshaw; Todd Grimshaw

Dennis Tanner is a fictional character from the British ITV soap opera Coronation Street, played by Philip Lowrie. The character was created by writer Tony Warren and was introduced in the first episode on 9 December 1960. Lowrie remained in the role for just over a year before being written out unexpectedly in 1962 when a strike by the actor's union Equity prevented new contracts being signed. Although the strike ended a few months later, Lowrie chose not to return until a year later. After a further five years, Lowrie became frustrated with the material his character was getting and decided not to renew his contract. Dennis departed Coronation Street on 12 June 1968, shortly after marrying girlfriend Jenny Sutton.

It was announced in January 2011 that the character would be returning to the soap once again after a 43-year absence. His return made it the longest any actor in Coronation Street has taken a break. His return aired on 12 May 2011.

In September 2011, Lowrie was presented with a certificate by Guinness World Records for being the person with the longest gap between television appearances in the same show, having returned to Coronation Street as Dennis Tanner.

It was announced on 14 December 2013 that Lowrie was to leave Coronation Street. He departed, alongside co-star Sue Johnston, who plays Gloria Price, on 21 February 2014. Dennis returned again briefly for another storyline from April to July 2014.

It was announced in February 2020 to mark the soap's 10,000th episode that Dennis Tanner was killed off-screen.

Introduced as a teenage tearaway, Dennis quickly became a reformed character and for most of his time on the show, he was primarily used as the show's comic relief with his storylines revolving around his interest in show business, much to the annoyance of his mother Elsie (Pat Phoenix). Dennis was later described as "immensely popular".

== Creation and development ==
=== Casting ===
Dennis was one of the original characters created by Tony Warren when devising his new serial, then named Florizel Street. Warren had envisaged Dennis as the show's bad boy, and was initially attracted to the idea of casting himself in the role. Warren explained "It was a much better part than Ken, as originally written. There were infinite possibilities in Dennis that were never explored. The criminal side. In those streets there is always a bad 'un, a wrong 'un. And he was the wrong 'un." Producers auditioned several actors for the part, of which two were picked to play Dennis in the pilots. Both proved to be unsuitable and Dennis was one of the last characters to be cast. Eventually it was down to two actors, Ken Farrington and Philip Lowrie, who were called in for camera tests opposite Pat Phoenix, who was cast already as Dennis' mother. Lowrie was chosen to play Dennis just days before rehearsals began, while Farrington was assured that despite not getting the part of Dennis, they wanted him to play another character due to be introduced later in the series, which turned out to be Billy Walker.

Lowrie remained in the series until he was written out in 1962, due to a strike at the time which prevented him from signing a new contract. Since his contract was just slightly longer than most of his peers, it meant Dennis' exit was timed a little later than the other cast members who had to leave because of the strike. Lowrie had wanted to leave with his screen sister Anne Cunningham, who played Linda, at the end of 1961 but producers vetoed the idea as they did not want all of Elsie's family deserting her at the same time. Lowrie returned to Coronation Street in 1963, and remained for a further five years, before tiring of the role and handing in his notice in 1968. In 2011, forty-three years after his last appearance, it was announced Dennis was to return to the Street, after Philip Lowrie agreed to reprise the role. His return made it the longest any actor in Coronation Street has taken a break.

=== Characterisation ===
Dennis was originally written as the local villain, but once cast, Lowrie's portrayal put a twist to Tony Warren's original scripts. It was commented in The Coronation Street Story, a 35th anniversary celebratory book, that Lowrie has immense charm that bubbled over into the character. Lowrie recalls a conversation with producer Harry Latham, who commended him on his performance, saying he "gave it some comedy", and that he was glad as they had once been considering writing the character out. John Dingwall of the Daily Record again notes the actor's "knack for comedy". Lowrie said upon his return in 2011: "It feels good to be back. Dennis is a really wonderful character to play because he's a lovable rogue, but there's a depth to him too."

=== Departure (2014) ===
On 14 December 2013, it was announced that Lowrie was to leave Coronation Street. However, the door was left open for a potential return. Lowrie left Coronation Street on 21 February 2014, along with his co-star Sue Johnston, who played Gloria Price, but he returned again on 18 April 2014. Dennis remained in the soap opera until 30 July 2014, when his storyline finally reached its conclusion.

=== Off-screen death ===
In January 2020, six years after his departure, it was announced that Dennis would be killed off off-screen. His death is the focus of the soap's 10,000th episode, broadcast in February. Producer Iain MacLeod billed the episode as "uniquely Corrie: funny, poignant and characterful - and a glorious homage to the comedic charabanc trips of times past". In the episode, Rita receives Dennis' ashes and a request from him for them to be scattered in Blackpool. Rita is then accompanied by Ken and other friends as they travel to Blackpool for the day. On the episode MacLeod added, "It's a really great exhibition of Coronation Street's classic qualities as we start a new decade on the cobbles."

== Storylines ==
=== Backstory ===
In his fictional backstory, Dennis was born on 1 April 1942 to Elsie and Arnold Tanner (Frank Crawshaw). When his parents' marriage collapses in 1945, Arnold left Elsie to bring up Dennis and his older sister Linda (Anne Cunningham) alone. Linda is often responsible for looking after Dennis while Elsie entertains her male friends. As a result, Dennis goes off the rails and frequently plays truant from school. He is eventually led into petty crime by new friend Jed Stone (Kenneth Cope), ending with both being sent to prison for six months in 1960.

=== 1960–1968 ===
Dennis appears in the first episode of Coronation Street. He has just been released from prison for petty theft from a newsagents and moves in with his mother, Elsie, who becomes frustrated with Dennis's poor efforts to find a job. Shortly before Christmas 1960, he gets one at the Orinoco club, a somewhat seedy bar in Weatherfield and begins a career in show business, despite having no real talent. Jed returns to the street asking if Dennis is interested in some money to do a crime; Dennis turns him down. They later make up and become good friends.

Dennis regularly brings home his work, a variety of circus acts he has booked for the club, annoying Elsie and causing several arguments. Dennis is later offered a spot as a singer and, performing under the pseudonym 'Ricky Dennis', he is popular with the regulars. It is short-lived as talent agent Lenny Phillips (John Barrie), who Dennis hoped would sign him, informs him that he is not very good and offers him a job as a talent scout instead and in March 1962, he offers Dennis the opportunity to head a new talent office in London. Dennis accepts and leaves Weatherfield. Dennis returns a year later and soon finds a new star in his hometown. Window cleaner Walter Potts (Christopher Sandford) seems to be the key to Dennis's future when he reveals a talent for singing. Dennis becomes Walter's manager but Walter moves to another agency when Dennis does not sign him officially. Dennis later moves to another club when Lenny's partner, Laurie Fraser (Stanley Meadows), arrives but he has now decided to train as a hairdresser. While on the course, he meets Sandra Petty (Heather Moore), a teenage girl who falls for him when he cuts her hair. Dennis is not interested in Sandra, who proceeds to send a love letter to him professing her feelings, but he tells her that he is engaged. To his horror, Sandra persuades her father, Lionel (Edward Evans), to buy the corner shop and the Pettys move in. Sandra continues to try and win Dennis over, which she eventually does. They date for a while but he is not that upset when Lionel sells the shop and she moves away a few months later.

Over the next year, Dennis flits from job to job until Len Fairclough (Peter Adamson) gives him a job at the builder's yard, which ends when he sets Len's house on fire while decorating. He moves on to Gamma Garments, working with Emily Nugent (Eileen Derbyshire) and begins an affair with Swedish colleague Inga Olsen (Gabrielle Drake), which costs him his job when they are caught in the shop late at night. Dennis and Inga leave for Sweden soon after to meet her family but he returns with Inga's sister, Karen (Jennie Woodford). It does not last and Karen goes home. Dennis is left to his own devices in 1967 when Elsie marries Steve Tanner (Paul Maxwell). He takes in various lodgers and acts, as he returns to show business. Wild parties lead to Dennis's eviction, which he does not fight when he meets Jenny Sutton (Mitzi Rogers), a hippie girl with whom he becomes besotted. Jenny abruptly leaves for London not long afterwards and Dennis follows.

Dennis and Jenny return a few weeks later with the news that they're engaged. He gets a job as a salesman and his dedication to his new work quickly gets Dennis a promotion. The couple marry in June and move to Bristol for Dennis's new job.

Off-screen, Dennis is arrested in 1973 for conning old age pensioners in a double glazing scam and sentenced to prison, an act which causes Jenny to leave him. Elsie visits him at prison, although the character remains off-screen due to Philip Lowrie's unwillingness to return to the role during that period (the character however does appear during this story in the novelisation of the show). This would be Dennis' last proper mention in the show until his return 38 years later in 2011.

=== 2011–2014 ===
In May 2011, teenage couple Sophie Webster (Brooke Vincent) and Sian Powers (Sacha Parkinson) volunteer at a soup kitchen for homeless people where they meet Dennis, unaware of his past and that he used to live on the street. He is too late for soup so the girls take him to the café, where Sylvia Goodwin (Stephanie Cole) takes an instant dislike to him. Later on, while Dennis is walking along the street, he spots "Dennis Tanner 1951" that he carved into the windowsill of No. 11 sixty years earlier. A woman approaches him and looking up he sees old flame Rita Sullivan (Barbara Knox), and she recognises him but, embarrassed, Dennis runs off. The next day, Rita goes to the soup kitchen and she and Dennis are reunited. Dennis tells Rita that his mother Elsie and her husband, Bill Gregory; died in a car crash in Portugal seven years earlier. Rita, teary-eyed, tells Dennis how sorry she is. After a clean-up back at Rita's flat, they go to The Rovers Return for a drink and a chance to meet old friends Emily and Ken Barlow (William Roache). He also meets Norris Cole (Malcolm Hebden), who takes a dislike to Dennis.

Resident Julie Carp (Katy Cavanagh) believes she could be related to Dennis after he reveals that Elsie's maiden name was Grimshaw, just like her half-sister Eileen Grimshaw (Sue Cleaver), and her family (who are the current residents of No. 11). She later invites Dennis and Rita to Eileen's and Dennis remembers the times he had in the house when he lived there. Julie begins to question him about his family, and he gives some details and after some research, Julie learns that Dennis is their cousin as Elsie Tanner was the sister of her grandfather, Arnley Grimshaw.

Dennis develops feelings for Rita and reveals all to Tina McIntyre (Michelle Keegan). Dennis receives a job offer in Birmingham and Tina tries to convince him to stay but Dennis leaves briefly before returning and declares his love for Rita. He proposes and she accepts. They marry on the day of the Queen's Diamond Jubilee, although there had been some doubt if the wedding would go ahead as the bride was angry with her groom and then was, unbeknownst to the groom, kidnapped by loan shark Rick Neelan (Greg Wood).

Dennis gets a job as a lollipop man as he is fed up with Norris constantly making jibes about him sponging. However, Dennis soon gets bored and meets an old client of his, Ritchie de Vries (Robin Askwith), to try to relaunch his musical career. He organises a gig at the bistro for him, which goes well, and he and Gloria Price (Sue Johnston) later agree to become his full-time managers. Rita becomes concerned about how close he is getting to Gloria, who makes no secret that she feels she would be better suited to Dennis. In February 2014, Dennis patches his relationship up with Rita after falling out over Gloria, but when Gloria announces her departure to explore the world and offers Dennis the chance to join her, he declines, however changes his mind, and sneaks out of the Rovers later that night to join Gloria. Gloria's family look on with disgust as Dennis jumps into her car. Rita emerges from The Rovers just as Dennis and Gloria drive past in a Jaguar E-Type. Dennis laughs and waves at Rita from the car, bidding her farewell. Rita watches her husband depart as she stands on the street with her friends and onlookers.

Several months later, Rita finds Dennis in hospital, having been sleeping rough after being dumped by Gloria. Rita refuses to forgive him but allows him to sleep on her sofa. Dennis consoles Rita when her close friend, Tina, dies after being murdered by Rob Donovan (Marc Baylis). Having helped Rita through her grief, they reconcile, although Dennis hatches a plan where he stages an almighty argument with Julie in The Rovers which ends in her throwing him out onto the streets, knowing that Rita would take him in. Norris, however, is suspicious of Dennis and has been giving him a hard time since he returned. When moaning about Dennis to Julie, Norris learns of Dennis' plan after Julie accidentally reveals all, so Norris then tries to persuade Rita to leave Dennis. An argument ensues in The Kabin between Dennis and Norris, which results in Dennis punching Norris in the face and causing him to fall over, just as Rita enters. Rita physically throws Dennis out of The Kabin, and he sadly bids farewell to Julie before leaving Weatherfield for the last time. Over a year later, Dennis writes to Rita asking for a divorce.

Six years later, Rita is surprised to receive a parcel from Dennis' solicitor containing a funeral urn and a letter, and is shocked to learn that Dennis has recently died from dementia and wants her to scatter his ashes in Blackpool, prompting a gang of street residents to get a party bus to travel there. During a rest stop, Rita sets the urn down but it is crushed by an ambulance, effectively scattering Dennis' ashes.
