= List of Coronation Street characters introduced in 1963 =

Coronation Street is a British soap opera, initially produced by Granada Television. Created by writer Tony Warren, Coronation Street first broadcast on ITV on 9 December 1960. The following is a list of characters introduced in the show's fourth year, by order of first appearance.

In April, outgoing series producer H.V. Kershaw saw the return of original cast member Philip Lowrie as Dennis Tanner after a year's absence. Kershaw vacated his position a month later, to be replaced by Margaret Morris — who in June secured a short return spot for David Barlow (Alan Rothwell), appearing in two episodes. Morris introduced two significant recurring characters in July, as Neil Crossley (Geoffrey Matthews) and Walter Potts (Christopher Sandford) made their first appearances, while Myra Booth (Susan Jameson) became the only new regular character to be introduced in 1963 when she arrived in September.

Myra's father George Dickenson (Stan Jay) followed her to Weatherfield in September, and Laurie Fraser (Stanley Meadows) began a five-month stint as a new love interest for Elsie Tanner in November. Jon Rollason also joined the cast as Dave Robbins in December.

== Neil Crossley ==
Neil Crossley
- Coronation Street character
- Portrayed by: Geoffrey Matthews
- Duration: 1963, 1966
- First appearance: 15 July 1963; Episode 270
- Last appearance: 7 December 1966; Episode 625
- Introduced by: Margaret Morris (1963); H.V. Kershaw (1966)
In-universe information
- Wife: Sheila Birtles
- Sons: Danny Crossley

Neil Crossley came to Weatherfield to take over as manager of Gamma Garments on Rosamund Street. He quickly caught the eye of Sheila Birtles, who was dating Jerry Booth at the time. Neil was unpopular with the locals, who believed he was no good, but Sheila was infatuated with him. After finding them together, Jerry fought with Neil and knocked him unconscious, prompting Sheila to dump Jerry, telling him she loved Neil. Neil, however, did not feel the same way and quickly dropped her, leaving the area soon after due to Emily Nugent reporting him to their boss Mr Papagopoulos for stealing from the petty cash. His exit sent Sheila into a downward spiral and she attempted suicide. Luckily Dennis Tanner rescued her and she left the Street for her parents' house. Sheila then discovered that she was pregnant and had a son, Danny, in 1964. She gave him up for adoption and eventually returned to Coronation Street, moving in with Elsie Tanner. Neil returned in 1966 and reunited with Sheila. They later married.

== Walter Potts ==
Walter Potts
- Coronation Street character
- Portrayed by: Chris Sandford
- Duration: 1963–1964
- First appearance: 15 July 1963; Episode 270
- Last appearance: 22 January 1964; Episode 325
- Introduced by: Margaret Morris

Walter Potts was Dennis Tanner's big discovery in his short-lived career as a talent agent. Walter was a window cleaner, who Dennis was determined to turn into a singing sensation. Using the stage name Brett Falcon, he recorded a song 'Not Too Little, Not Too Much' with help from a man from Dennis's agency, Laurie Fraser. Laurie soon sacked Dennis for incompetence, and the song proved a hit. Actor Chris Sandford even got the song to No. 17 in the charts in the real world.

== Myra Booth ==
Myra Booth
- Coronation Street character
- Portrayed by: Susan Jameson
- Duration: 1963–1964, 1968
- First appearance: 4 September 1963; Episode 285
- Last appearance: 21 February 1968; Episode 750
- Introduced by: Margaret Morris (1963); Michael Cox (1968)
In-universe information
- Occupation: Typist
- Father: George Dickenson
- Husband: Jerry Booth (1963–1968)

Myra Booth (also Dickenson) was the wife of Jerry Booth. Typist Myra stunned Jerry by planning their wedding just two weeks after they had met, and Jerry got too carried away with the idea to stop it. They married on 19 October 1963, and moved into number 13 after a brief honeymoon. Jerry and Myra had money troubles due to taking on a mortgage in the purchase on their house, and Myra, who'd been handling the finances, had got the couple into debt. After Myra became pregnant and gave up her job at Gamma Garments, their only choice was to sell the house, and the Booths moved away. Myra returned in 1968 to seek a reconciliation with Jerry but it was not to be, and they were divorced only days later.

== George Dickenson ==
George Dickenson
- Coronation Street character
- Portrayed by: Stan Jay
- Duration: 1963–1966, 1968
- First appearance: 4 September 1963; Episode 285
- Last appearance: 28 February 1968; Episode 752
- Introduced by: Margaret Morris (1963, 1964); H.V. Kershaw (1965, 1966); Michael Cox (1968)
In-universe information
- Daughters: Myra Booth

George Dickenson was the over-protective father of Myra Booth, who turned up several times to sort out their problems, both personally and financially.

== Laurie Fraser ==
Laurie Fraser
- Coronation Street character
- Portrayed by: Stanley Meadows
- Duration: 1963–1964
- First appearance: 13 November 1963; Episode 305
- Last appearance: 8 April 1964; Episode 347
- Introduced by: Margaret Morris
In-universe information
- Wife: Rosemary Fraser

Laurie Fraser was a friend of Lenny Phillips, the owner of the theatrical agency of which Dennis Tanner was a representative. Laurie knew the business far more than Dennis, and made Dennis' only hope Walter Potts his own project instead. Elsie Tanner fell for Laurie, but the romance never lasted when Elsie discovered Laurie was married.

== Dave Robbins ==
Dave Robbins
- Coronation Street character
- Portrayed by: Jon Rollason
- Duration: 1963–1964, 1969, 1971
- First appearance: 16 December 1963; Episode 314
- Last appearance: 28 July 1971; Episode 1099
- Introduced by: Margaret Morris (1963); H.V. Kershaw (1969); Leslie Duxbury (1971)

Dave Robbins was a colleague of Ken Barlow's, who moved into number 9 with Ken and his wife Valerie as lodger when he needed a place to stay. Valerie resented having to share her home, and had him move into the flat above Frank's DIY shop. When young Susan Schofield was knocked down and killed on Rosamund Street, in the exact spot Ken and Dave had been petitioning for a children's crossing, Dave broke down. While Ken took advantage of the situation by appearing on television to debate with a local councillor, Valerie felt compelled to comfort Dave. Valerie began to question her marriage to Ken and she fell deeper for Dave, with the situation coming to a head when Val packed her bags and left, only to turn up on Dave's doorstep. She felt humiliated when Dave turned her down and she was forced to call Ken to take her home. Dave left the flat soon after when Frank sold the property.

== Others ==
| Character | Date(s) | Episode(s) | Actor | Circumstances |
|---|---|---|---|---|
| Johnny Alexander | 7–21 January | 216–220 | Thomas Baptiste | Bus conductor who fights with Len Fairclough. Len is prejudiced as Johnny is black, and refuses to pay his bus fare, though he swears he did. Len lodges a complaint and Johnny is sacked. Later, finding that his friends are disgusted by his actions, Len admits he had not paid and Johnny is given his job back, though he refuses to work at the company again. |
| Jim Baker | 16 January | 219 | Derek Benfield | |
| Mrs Alexander | 21 January | 220 | Barbara Assoon | Wife of Johnny Alexander. |
| Miss Welch | 4–6 February | 224–225 | Rhoda Lewis | Lucille Hewitt's teacher at school. |
| Mr Henshaw | 13 February | 227 | Richard Jacques | Representative of Newton & Ridley brewery, he reports Annie Walker for selling non-brewery goods. |
| Fred Hamilton | 20 February | 229 | Donald Eccles | Area manager for Newton & Ridley, he invites Jack Walker for a meeting. He has Jack under the impression that he is getting fired, before revealing he is just joking. Fred tells Jack that the regulars had written to him in support of the Walkers. |
| Policeman | 25 March; 28 October – 6 November; 2 March 1964; 9 September 1964 | 238; 300–303; 336; 391 | Brian Steele | Policeman who investigates a report of excessive noise. He returns in October after the Mission vestry is ransacked, and again the following year during a bomb scare. He evacuates the residents to the cellar of the Mission while the bomb is defused. |
| Georgina | 1 April | 240 | Judy Cornwell | |
| Mr Clegg | 1 April | 240 | Geoffrey Hibbert | A man who turns up at Elsie Tanner's door to collect the overdue rent. Elsie refuses to pay it. |
| Rita Spears | 8–17 April | 242–245 | Elizabeth Valentine | Fifteen-year-old schoolgirl friend of Lucille Hewitt who had a crush on their teacher Ken Barlow. Lucille promised to get Rita a picture of Ken, and she asked his wife Val if she could have one, prompting Valerie to believe Lucille had a crush on him. When it was discovered Rita was the one who lusted after Ken, he began to avoid her. This led to Rita flirting with local builder Jerry Booth, seven years her senior, and to make his on/off girlfriend Sheila Birtles jealous, he took her to The Rovers to show her off, unaware of Rita's age. When Ken recognised her, Jerry marched her outside and told her off. |
| Mr Riding | 8–17 April | 242–245 | Jack McNaughton | Bailiff who arrives at the Tanners to settle Elsie Tanner's debt. |
| Postman | 8 April | 242 | Roy Maxwell | |
| Van driver | 17 April | 245 | Alan Hockey | Driver of the van in which the bailiffs loaded Elsie Tanner's furniture into, before she gave in and paid up. |
| Mavis Fox | 24 April – 1 May | 247–249 | Maureen Davis | A girl who follows Dennis Tanner back to Weatherfield when he returns from London. Mavis' mother owns a chain of hotels and Dennis had told her he too was wealthy, making his money as a mill-owner. Elsie forces Dennis to come clean when she finds out that he had also told her he only came to Coronation Street to visit his grandmother, and her nurse (Elsie). Disillusioned, Mavis goes back home soon after. |
| Alf | 24 April | 247 | Douglas Austin | Van drivers who fool Emily Nugent and Doreen Lostock into believing they work for Gamma Garments and have come to transfer some stock to another branch. Without manager Leonard Swindley present, they succeed in stealing the stock. |
| Fred | 24 April | 247 | David Sumner | Van drivers who fool Emily Nugent and Doreen Lostock into believing they work for Gamma Garments and have come to transfer some stock to another branch. Without manager Leonard Swindley present, they succeed in stealing the stock. |
| DS Shorrocks | 29 April – 1 May | 248–249 | David Morell | Detective who investigated the theft at Gamma Garments. |
| Ministry of Pensions Supervisor | 6 May | 250 | Julian Somers | Pension workers who deal with the case of Ena Sharples' missing pension book. |
| Ministry of Pensions Assistant | 6 May | 250 | Alison Morris | Pension workers who deal with the case of Ena Sharples' missing pension book. |
| Michael Butterworth | 8 May; 11 November | 251; 304 | Roy Holder | Schoolboy who stole Ena Sharples' pension book and withdrew a week's money. Michael returned the book, and was put on probation. Months later, Ena's vestry was ransacked and initially Len Fairclough was thought to be the culprit, but the police soon discovered it was in fact Michael, who was punished for his crime. |
| Jim Whitehead | 15 May | 253 | Graham Rigby | |
| Alan Mather | 15 May | 253 | Alan Downer | A cousin of Florrie Lindley, who accompanied her to a builders' dance in May 1963, where they bumped into Florrie's neighbours Elsie Tanner and Len Fairclough. |
| Mr Cresswell | 22 May | 255 | Terence Cooper | A buyer who came to Gamma Garments. Emily Nugent and Doreen Lostock take a liking to him, thinking he is their new manager to replace Leonard Swindley, and are disappointed to discover the truth. |
| Mr Battersby | 27 May | 256 | Victor Tandy | |
| Della Dee | 27–29 May | 256–257 | Yvonne Walsh | Chorus girls hired by theatrical agent Dennis Tanner. |
| Gloria Dee | 27–29 May | 256–257 | Sheila Fearn | Chorus girls hired by theatrical agent Dennis Tanner. |
| Pop singer | 27 May | 256 | Leslie Southwick | A singer who auditions for Dennis Tanner. |
| Arthur Forsythe-Jones | 3–12 June; 25 December | 258–261; 317 | Ian Colin | A friend of Annie Walker's, she meets him while on holiday and they keep in touch. Arthur visits her and his closeness with Annie makes her husband Jack jealous. Arthur later returns when Dennis Tanner organises a This Is Your Life-style show honouring Annie. |
| Ethel Tyson | 17 June; 16 September – 9 October | 262; 288–295 | Susan Field | Lives in a flat on Victoria Street. She refuses an increase in rent when Frank Barlow opens a DIY shop on the ground floor below her flat. Frank threatens Ethel with eviction, and so Ethel enlists the help of her brother George and his son Jim. George threatens violence, and Jim ends up starting a fire in the shop. Luckily Frank manages to put out the fire and Ethel is left stunned that her family might have been the death of her. She leaves the flat the next day, still owing rent. |
| Miss Read | 1–3 July | 266–267 | Nancie Jackson | A lady from personnel at Miami Modes, she settles a dispute between Elsie Tanner and Christine Appleby by transferring Christine to another branch. |
| Delivery man | 10 July | 269 | John Evitts | A man who delivered a large amount of post to Dennis Tanner after he advertised in the local newspaper for new acts. |
| Marjorie Platt | 15 July | 270 | Sandra Gough | |
| Fred | 15 July | 270 | George Betton | |
| Pat Lynch | 22–24 July | 272–273 | Loelia Kidd | An acquaintance of Neil Crossley, who owes Pat £15. She refuses to leave until he has paid her. |
| Dr Aston | 12 August – 16 September; 27 April 1964; 14–16 June 1965; 20–22 December 1965 | 278–288; 352; 470–471; 524–525 | Aleksander Browne | Local Weatherfield GP between 1963 and 1965. His finest moment was rescuing Sheila Birtles from her attempted suicide along with Dennis Tanner. |
| First Policeman | 26 August | 282 | Geoffrey Reed | A couple of policemen who came across a broken down van containing the drunken Rovers darts team. The men did not take the policemen seriously following a warning to lower the noise, and ended up spending a night in the cells. |
| Second Policeman | 26 August | 282 | Roy Minton | A couple of policemen who came across a broken down van containing the drunken Rovers darts team. The men did not take the policemen seriously following a warning to lower the noise, and ended up spending a night in the cells. |
| Waiter | 26 August | 282 | Ralph Broadbent | A waiter at a restaurant on a lay-by, he ordered the Rovers darts team to leave. |
| Delivery man | 4 September | 285 | Vincent Worth | |
| George Pickup | 23 September – 9 October | 290–295 | Paul Dawkins | Brother and nephew of Ethel Tyson. She enlists them to help warn off Frank Barlow, but Jim goes too far when he sets fire to Frank's shop. Frank agrees not to report him if the family leave the area. |
| Jim Pickup | 23 September – 9 October | 290–295 | Bunny May | Brother and nephew of Ethel Tyson. She enlists them to help warn off Frank Barlow, but Jim goes too far when he sets fire to Frank's shop. Frank agrees not to report him if the family leave the area. |
| Woman customer | 23 September | 290 | Doris Wellings | Customer at Frank Barlow's DIY shop. |
| Vincent | 14 October | 296 | Geoffrey Hinsliff | A friend of Jerry Booth's, who he asks to be best man at his wedding to Myra Dickenson, without the knowledge that Myra took it upon herself to ask Dennis Tanner instead. |
| Credit salesman | 14–16 October | 296–297 | Derek Benfield | |
| Barman | 23 October | 299 | Bud Bennett | Present at Jerry Booth and Myra Dickenson's wedding and the following reception. |
| Verger | 23 October | 299 | Eddie King | Present at Jerry Booth and Myra Dickenson's wedding and the following reception. |
| Drummer | 23 October | 299 | Anthony Wingate | Present at Jerry Booth and Myra Dickenson's wedding and the following reception. |
| Doctor | 28 October | 300 | Geoffrey Alexander | Doctor who tends to Ena Sharples upon returning home to find the vestry had been ransacked. |
| DS Bowen | 6 November | 303 | Christopher Gover | Detective investigating the break-in at the Mission. |
| Geoff Webster | 11 November | 304 | David Burke | |
| Viv | 27 November | 309 | Bobbie Oswald | Schoolgirls taking part in Ken Barlow's school play. |
| Beryl | 27 November | 309 | Margaret Lambert | Schoolgirls taking part in Ken Barlow's school play. |
| Joyce | 27 November | 309 | Kate Allitt | Schoolgirls taking part in Ken Barlow's school play. |
| Factory girl | 2 December | 310 | Sandra Gough | |
| Woman | 2 December | 310 | Beatrice Nield | |
| Mr Thornley | 9 December | 312 | Alan Curtis | Father of one of Lucille Hewitt's classmates. |
| Man | 9–11 December | 312–313 | Denver Hall | A man who steals Florrie Lindley's handbag. |
| Charlie Pimlott | 11 December | 313 | Harold Goodwin | |
| Barman | 25 December | 317 | John Garrie | Barman who covered for the Walkers when they were out for the night. |
| George Stubbins | 25 December | 317 | William Wymar | Old friends of Annie Walker's, they arrived for a This Is Your Life-style celebration organised by Dennis Tanner. |
| Edgar Nuttall | 25 December | 317 | Michael Barrington | Old friends of Annie Walker's, they arrived for a This Is Your Life-style celebration organised by Dennis Tanner. |
| Norman Phillips | 30 December – 1 January 1964; 24 August – 7 October 1964 | 318–319; 386–399 | Ray Brooks | Nephew of Lenny Phillips, he is hired to take over the running of the talent agency locally when Dennis Tanner is sacked. |
