= Emily Bishop =

Fictional character from Coronation Street

- Coronation Street character
- Portrayed by: Uncredited (1960); Eileen Derbyshire (1961–2019)
- Duration: 1960–2016, 2019
- First appearance: Episode 4; 21 December 1960
- Last appearance: Episode 9895; 9 October 2019
- Created by: Tony Warren
- Introduced by: Stuart Latham (1961); Iain MacLeod (2019)
- Spin-off appearances: The Life and Loves of Elsie Tanner (1987); Coronation Street: Text Santa Special (2012–2013)
In-universe information
- Other names: Emily Nugent; Emily Swain
- Occupation: Shop assistant Café waitress Charity shop manager Hospital chaplain
- Father: James Nugent
- Mother: Agnes Nugent
- Brothers: Edgar Nugent
- Sisters: Joan Corrie; Norah Seddon; Brenda Nugent; Marjorie Nugent
- Husband: Ernest Bishop (1972–1978); Arnold Swain (1980; void)
- Aunts: Mary Nugent; May Nugent
- Nephews: Spider Nugent

Emily Bishop (also Nugent and Swain, also credited as Miss Nugent) is a fictional character from the British ITV soap opera Coronation Street. Played by Eileen Derbyshire, the character is the longest-standing female character in the serial, having first appeared on-screen during the fourth episode on 21 December 1960, played by an uncredited walk on actress. From January 1961 onwards, she was credited as played by Eileen Derbyshire. Derbyshire announced in November 2015 that she would be taking a retirement from the show and Emily departed on New Year's Day 2016 after 55 years on screen. It was announced on 9 August 2019 that Derbyshire had agreed to briefly reprise the role. She made a brief cameo on 9 October 2019 for Ken Barlow's (William Roache) 80th birthday celebration.

== Creation ==
=== Casting ===
In December 1960, actress Eileen Derbyshire was approached by Granada to play a part in the show, but the actress was tied up in a Christmas stage play. Of this Derbyshire said: "Four weeks after it started (airing) they said I could either wait until they introduced a new family into the programme or take the tiny part of a little, shy woman helper at the Mission Hall" going on to say "I have always been a fatalist, so I took the bird in one hand, not realising what a momentous decision I was making".

=== Background ===
An early image of Emily Bishop (then Nugent) as she appeared in 1961

The character of Emily was introduced when actress Eileen Derbyshire took on the role in Episode 15 on Friday, 27 January. At first, the character was simply called "Miss Nugent"; it was not until 1962 that she was given the name "Emily" by the show's writers. She continued to be credited on the programme as "Miss Nugent" until 1969.

Although rarely seen, the set of Emily's kitchen is the oldest surviving set. (The second-oldest set is Ken's kitchen, with the famous avocado-green tiles.) All other sets have been redecorated at least once since we first saw Emily's kitchen. Emily's back room/parlour, however, was redecorated off screen. In the story a fire was caused by a candle left unattended by Spider and Toyah when they made their way upstairs after a romantic evening. Spider was able to track down matching wallpaper to cover up the fire damage so that Emily would not know what had happened, but in reality, the wallpaper was no longer obtainable, so the whole set was re-decorated in a very similar style. Emily has lived at No. 3 Coronation Street since 1972. It is mentioned that Emily is from Harrogate.

== Development ==
=== Longevity ===
During an interview in 1991, Derbyshire spoke about her character's thirty years in the show, stating: "The writers have a tough enough task as it is, trying to find new storylines for a character who has been in the serial for three decades." Going on to say "I just get on with it. Emily has had a more colourful past than you might think. She has had lots of men friends and liaisons. In the early days, when they were stuck for something to do with her, I think the writers used to say 'Let's give Emily another boyfriend.' I've lost count of the number of men friends she has had".

Over the years, the character has proved her good neighbour image by taking in a number of lodgers, most notably Percy Sugden (Bill Waddington), Curly Watts (Kevin Kennedy), her nephew Spider Nugent (Martin Hancock), Rita Tanner (Barbara Knox), and Norris Cole (Malcolm Hebden).

=== Departure and brief return ===
In November 2015, Coronation Street confirmed that Derbyshire had requested a six-month break with immediate effect, which she was granted. Derbyshire was one of four cast members to announce their temporary exit around the same time as Alison King, David Neilson, and Les Dennis, who play Carla Connor, Roy Cropper and Michael Rodwell respectively, were also announced to be doing this. Derbyshire's exit scenes aired on 1 January 2016 in which Emily left the street to visit her nephew Spider.

Derbyshire later extended her leave until the end of 2016. In November 2016, it was reported that Derbyshire would not be reprising the role. A source told The Sun that there was "no expectation that she will be back". They went on to say: "All of her cast mates have accepted she won't be returning. She's 85 and has been out of the show for a year, so she probably would have found it tough to get back into the fast pace of filming." However, a spokesperson later said the door is still open for her when she is ready, saying: "Eileen is taking an extended break, and has given no indication that she doesn't plan to return."

During an episode broadcast on 3 January 2018, Ken Barlow remarked to Sophie Webster that Emily had returned to the UK to look after her niece Freda, who had fallen ill. This led to speculation that the character would soon be returning to the show.

In April 2019, producer Iain MacLeod stated that there were no plans to bring Emily back at that moment, but that the door would be left open for a possible future return. However, four months later, on 9 August 2019, it was announced that Derbyshire had agreed to return briefly to reprise her role as Emily Bishop. She appeared in the first episode broadcast on 9 October 2019 in a special video message to Ken Barlow to mark his 80th birthday.

== Storylines ==
Emily first moved to Weatherfield in the late-1940s from Harrogate to work for Leonard Swindley (Arthur Lowe) at the Glad Tidings Mission Hall. A very quiet and pious woman, she hardly knew anyone up on the street except Ena Sharples (Violet Carson) the caretaker of the Mission Hall and the owners of the Corner Shop, Elsie Lappin (Maudie Edwards) and then Florrie Lindley (Betty Alberge). She eventually meets the residents of the street following a gas leak in January 1961 which forced them to stay overnight at the Mission Hall. After that, she soon becomes friends with many of the residents and became a pillar of the community.

Swindley soon ventures out becoming manager of the Rosamand Street branch of Gamma Garments, a clothing chain with Emily as his head assistant, their relationship becomes stronger and they decide to get married; however, Swindley's pompousness and arrogance forces her to jilt him at the altar. A very moral woman, Emily prides herself on saving herself for marriage, but her resolve is eventually weakened and she begins a relationship with a Hungarian man called Miklos Zadic (Paul Stassino). She later confides in her friend Valerie Barlow (Anne Reid) that she has no regrets about the encounter; Emily is, by that time, 39 years old and assumes it will be now or never. With Miklos out of the picture, Emily falls in love with mild-mannered Ernest Bishop (Stephen Hancock) after meeting him at his mother's funeral in 1969. Their courtship is tested many times over and lasts for three years. They get engaged in 1971. The next year, Ernest is jailed while in Mallorca; when he is subsequently released, Emily and Ernest decide to get married. The wedding was broadcast across the UK on Easter Monday (3 April 1972).

Despite rough patches, Emily and Ernest's marriage is relatively stable and they love each other very much. Emily miscarries and later starts menopause, dashing their chances of having a child of their own. This leads to many arguments between them, and they are forced to re-evaluate their marriage after just two years. They turn to short-term fostering to assuage Emily's need to connect with young children. Tragedy strikes when Ernest is shot and killed in a botched robbery, leaving Emily devastated. Emily only starts to heal from heartbreak by playing with a baby, namely Deirdre Langton's (Anne Kirkbride) infant daughter Tracy (Christabel Finch). To occupy her time, Emily leaves her post at the local hospital and becomes manager of a café, with Gail Potter (Helen Worth) as her assistant. When the cafe is abruptly sold and new owner Jim Sedgwick (Michael O'Hagan) makes drastic changes to the food and service, Emily walks out and Gail takes over, although eventually Jim's wife Alma Sedgewick (Amanda Barrie) starts managing the cafe. In many respects, Emily has never let Ernest go but does marry again, to Arnold Swain (George Waring). He turns out to be a bigamist. After she ends their relationship, he visits her and plans a murder-suicide. Emily tells him that God would not approve of what he is doing but Arnold insists she is wrong and goes upstairs to find a Bible. While he is gone, Emily runs outside for help. Arnold is sent to an institution where he dies ten months later. When factory boss Mike Baldwin (Johnny Briggs) needs a new wages clerk, he turns to Emily and she starts working in the same job held by her husband before he died.

In June 1992, Emily has a mental breakdown. She cannot remember appointments, becomes confused and her appearance suffers. Lodger Percy Sugden (Bill Waddington), protects her, covering up these very unusual actions. He becomes increasingly concerned about her behaviour and alerts Emily's friends and neighbours. One day, Emily disappears without a word. When friends and neighbours ignore Percy's call for help, he calls the police who find Emily wandering aimlessly, clearly having suffered a breakdown. When Emily has recovered enough to leave hospital, she tells Percy that he is a good friend, and thanks him for all he had done. Percy later leaves. Emily falls in love once more, with Bernard, a vicar. He breaks off the engagement when he finds out she had suffered a mental breakdown. Because of his own past mental conditions, he cannot face the possibility of it recurring. Since then, Emily has sworn off love completely, pushing herself into more topical endeavours instead. When her nephew Spider (Martin Hancock) arrives on the scene, Emily takes him in and they become friends as well as partners in saving the Red Rec from Alf Roberts' (Bryan Mosley) proposed plans for a "Millennium Bowl". Emily spends a night up a tree standing by her convictions that the Red Rec is the last green space in Weatherfield and it deserves preservation.

Richard Hillman (Brian Capron), Gail's husband, attempts to murder Emily for financial reasons. He breaks in while she is watching television and babysitting for Ashley (Steven Arnold) and Maxine Peacock (Tracy Shaw). Richard knocks her unconscious with a crowbar but is interrupted by Maxine's premature return. He attacks Maxine with the same weapon, killing her instantly. Emily makes a full recovery but suffers terrible guilt for surviving when Maxine did not. She prevents a murder when grief-crazed Brenda Fearns (Julia Deakin) almost jumps off a 43-foot church tower with baby Bethany Platt (Amy and Emily Walton).

Emily befriends Ed Jackson (Chris Walker), a new member of the congregation at her church. He soon becomes a regular visitor to her house, doing odd jobs and they remain friends after he confesses that he has recently been released from prison. However, Emily is devastated when Ed admits why he has been in prison—he was the man who shot and killed Ernest. He tells her that, after finding God while in prison, he has come looking for her, attempting to atone for his misdemeanours. Enraged, Emily throws him out, and goes on to question her faith. Eventually, Emily forgives Ed as he contemplates suicide, and gives him Ernest's camera as a keepsake, asking him to send her a photo of him every year so that she can make sure he is alive and well.

When Norris Cole (Malcolm Hebden) finds an envelope in Emily's drawer while looking to see what her PIN was when she has forgotten it. The envelope reads: "to be opened after my death". Norris tells Rita Sullivan (Barbara Knox) about it and she tells Emily about the situation so Emily agrees to tell Norris. She makes him promise not to tell anyone but it turns out that the envelope contains plans for her funeral. Norris discovers that this envelope is not the one he has seen and tries hard to find out what really is in the envelope. It is revealed to be old photos of Rita from her singing days. Emily encounters Jed Stone (Kenneth Cope), a former resident of the street, when she is working at the canteen at Weatherfield General Hospital. Taking pity on him as he has no home to go to, Emily invites him to come and lodge with her and Norris. When Jed later goes missing, Emily is worried as he has left his cap behind. When Maria Connor (Samia Ghadie) returns from holiday she is surprised to learn that Jed has disappeared as they both had believed Tony Gordon (Gray O'Brien) was a killer. After Maria accuses Tony of killing Jed both Maria and Emily are relieved when Jed turns up "unharmed" but Jed is really hiding marks on his neck from when Tony had strangled him. Emily is later upset to hear that Jed has suffered a second heart attack after he receives a visit from Tony's henchman.

Norris' half-brother Ramsay Clegg (Andrew Sachs) arrives after them not seeing each for many years. Emily tries to get Norris to forgive Ramsay before his return to Australia, and in doing so begins to fall for the man. She is very upset when he departs the Street, and is later shocked when he dies suddenly on his flight home. She condemns Norris for treating Ramsay in the cold manner that he did. Emily later forgives Norris for his treatment of Ramsay. Emily took in Tracy (now played by Kate Ford) and her daughter Amy Barlow (Elle Mulvaney) as lodgers in her front parlour, after they were made homeless. However, she kicks them out after Tracy deliberately ruins Ernest's pair of shoes mistakenly believing that they belong to Norris. Emily tells Norris of her ambition to do charity work in Peru and to see her nephew, Spider again. She books a flight and she departs the street in January 2016.

In 2018, Ken Barlow (William Roache) tells Sophie Webster (Brooke Vincent) that Emily is back in the United Kingdom to look after a sick Freda Burgess (Ali Briggs) in Edinburgh. Mary Taylor (Patti Clare) mentions to her son Jude Appleton (Paddy Wallace) and his wife Angie (Victoria Ekanoye) that Norris has visited Emily in Scotland. In 2019, Emily speaks to Ken via Skype to wish him a happy eightieth birthday. In 2021, Ken calls Emily to inform her that Norris has died of a stroke.

== Reception ==
In 2001, a storyline involving Emily lending her nephew Spider £15,000 for a new business venture was criticised for not being authentic. Journalist Tony Bridgland writing for the Telegraph said of the plot; "It is beginning to look as though Coronation Street's researchers failed to do enough homework to make their plot watertight." The Guardian compiled a list of ten favourite Christmas moments from soap; on the list was the 2002 Christmas episode where Richard Hillman came close to suffocating Emily with a pillow as she slept.

Discussing the scene where Emily was attacked by Richard Hillman in 2003, critic Chris Diamond wryly commented: "Surely Emily wouldn't be in the line of fire? Poor, drippy, sensible shoes Emily? But she was and the scene where Richard laid the blow on her was one of the most genuinely shocking things I have ever seen on television. I just couldn't believe my eyes. And that was where the genius of the episode lay. I knew Emily was going to get it. I saw Richard creeping up behind her and I was fully cognisant of the fact that the crowbar in his hand was not for snagging her cardie. But I was sure that even at this point something was going to happen that would divert Richard from his target. When the blow actually fell I was utterly amazed."

Dek Hogan writing for media website Digital Spy in 2005 praised Eileen Derbyshire's comedic abilities; "the book club storyline doesn't exactly fill me with joy but does have the advantage of giving some fine comedic material to the underused talents of Eileen Derbyshire. As Emily Bishop she has shown a major flair for these scenes in the past." In 2006, writer Eve-Marie Wilson in an article criticised the plot which saw Emily forgiving her husband's killer: "...on Coronation Street recently, Emily Bishop was having a crisis of conscience, could she or couldn’t she forgive Ed, the man who had killed her husband all those years ago. After two or three episodes the matter was resolved. Had that incident occurred on a soap opera she’d still be undecided six months later!"

In 2009 Ruth Deller of entertainment website Lowculture commented that Emily is underused in storylines, but praised her stating: "Emily is one of those characters who seems to have always been around but rarely gets singled out for attention, yet she can be both funny and heartbreaking. She's really stood out in her scenes this month and has been the only good thing about the Norris/Ramsay storyline of infinite tedium." In the book "Women and soap opera: a study of prime time soaps", Christine Geraghty describes Emily as being "shy, frightened of speaking out until roused, a spinster type whose complex marital history is seldom referred to".

== Video and DVD references ==
- Coronation Street: The Early Days. Video. Granada Media Group, 2001.
