= Jed Stone =

Fictional character from Coronation Street

- Coronation Street character
- Portrayed by: Kenneth Cope
- Duration: 1961–1963, 1966, 2008–2009
- First appearance: Episode 38; 24 April 1961
- Last appearance: Episode 7004; 2 February 2009
- Created by: Tony Warren
- Introduced by: Stuart Latham (1961); H. V. Kershaw (1962); Howard Baker (1966); Kim Crowther (2008)
- Spin-off appearances: Minnie Caldwell Remembered (1988)

Jed Stone is a fictional character from the British ITV soap opera Coronation Street, played by Kenneth Cope. He was a lodger of Minnie Caldwell's in the 1960s, and her nickname for him was "Sunny Jim". He made a reappearance after an absence of 42 years, only to tangle with local villain Tony Gordon. Cope also appeared in the 1988 special Minnie Caldwell Remembered.

== Development ==
Jed Stone in the 1960s.

Kenneth Cope made his first appearance as Jed Stone in April 1961, which was originally intended to be a one-off. But Kenneth Cope impressed the producers, and was brought back in September that year. Due to an Equity strike, Kenneth Cope could not return to the series until 1962, so was absent for a year. Jed Stone appeared for four more months from November 1962 to March 1963, and was reintroduced for the best part of 1966.

In 2008, plans were made for increasingly villainous Tony Gordon to menace a pensioner named Mr. Gamble. Casting director June West suggested they bring Jed Stone back instead, initially for four episodes. Jed was brought back later in the year, in which he was originally intended to be killed off at the hands of Tony Gordon, although this was changed.

== Storylines ==
Jed served time in a borstal in Manchester in 1960. He first appeared in April 1961 to see if his friend Dennis Tanner (Philip Lowrie), who he had met in Borstal would help him on a job – of dubious legality – but Dennis was not into that sort of thing anymore and turned him down. He returned on 13 September (the same day as Ida Barlow's funeral), reformed but unemployed, to find legitimate work with Dennis' help. Dennis was promoted at the Orinoco club and managed to get Jed his old job. Jed was a regular fixture in the street from then on and became best friends with Dennis, Christine Hardman, and Jean Stark, who he briefly dated.

After some time away, Jed reappeared in November 1962, as Dennis had told him he would be able to lodge at No.11, but Dennis' mother, Elsie, was not having it. A sympathetic Minnie Caldwell let him live with her at No.5. Having finished at the Orinocco, he made money by doing odd jobs for friends and trying out the occasional business idea, including selling wash basins, waxwork dummies, operating a market stall and working in an auction room. Whatever the job, they were always short-term and he never earned a lot. He was initially intended to be a somewhat nefarious character, but during an argument with Ena Sharples (Violet Carson), actor Kenneth Cope thought the cameras had stopped rolling and said, "Give us a kiss!" The line was kept in, and Jed became a more lighthearted figure, running various schemes while helping Minnie out when he could. He became known for his trademark flat cap, which he even wore during a bed scene. Jed was arrested on Minnie's birthday in 1966 and sentenced to nine months in prison for stealing blankets. He is released off-screen in 1967. Although he doesn't return to the street, he keeps contact with Minnie until her departure in 1976. Jed also plays a part in the introduction of Eddie Yeats in 1974, as he sends Eddie (revealed to be his former cellmate) to stay with Minnie for the Christmas period.

Jed returned on 8 August 2008, wearing his cap and holding a cat (as Minnie had always held her cat) named Sonny Jim. Landlord Tony Gordon (Gray O'Brien) barged into Jed's home, but he refused Tony's attempts to persuade him to move out by saying he'd lived there for 40 years and in spite of his health problems, he was still more of a man than Tony. Ten days later, Tony returned in an attempt to buy Jed out of the flat. Tony returned a few hours later, and Jed suffered a heart attack. Tony delayed calling the ambulance, instead calling Jason Grimshaw (Ryan Thomas) who was helping to develop the flats. He then told the paramedics that Jed had been ready to sign the papers before he collapsed. He left Jed's cat on the streets to fend for itself. Jed was last seen in the hospital when Tony informed him of clearing the house out and said some harsh words to Mr. Stone, Jed then began to cry in turmoil over losing his cat and home.

On 17 November 2008, Emily Bishop met him while working in the canteen at Weatherfield General and recognised him from his time on the street and later invited him to move in with her and Norris Cole. His nemesis Tony was stunned to see him on the Street and the pair clashed, with Jed demanding that Tony give him money for having ruined his life. In December 2008, he paid Maria Connor a visit; he told her all about his experience at the hands of Tony and supported her strong suspicions that Tony had killed her husband Liam. Jed became more suspicious when he later saw Tony talking with Jimmy Dockerson. Tony tried to bribe Jed with a sum of money in the ginnel which Jed accepted but he assured Tony that he would not get rid of him that easily.

On Christmas Eve 2008, Jed paid Tony a visit in the Underworld factory, demanding money for evicting him from his home, and continually accused him of Liam's murder. Tony eventually strangled Jed with a piece of lingerie, a gift he had planned to give to his wife, Carla (Alison King). He then loaded Jed's lifeless body into a hamper, before covering it with party decorations for a party with the factory girls, who were oblivious to the situation. Tony returned to the factory on Christmas Day to dispose of Jed's body, only to discover that Jed was still alive in the hamper. He then bound and gagged Jed; Tony then offered him a new apartment, which was rent-free and he would also get £3,000 to help get him started. Jed agreed to this and Tony drove off with Jed in the back of his van. Later in the episode, Tony was seen cleaning the back of the van, which made people speculate that Jed may have been murdered by Tony. This later would be proven wrong though.

On 23 January 2009, Tony told Maria that he had killed Jed on Christmas Eve, rather than merely rendering him unconscious. She proceeded to tell everyone in the Rovers what he told her, but no-one believed her. On 28 January 2009, Tony Gordon arranged for Jed to return to the street to discredit Maria's accusations. Jed followed Tony's instructions to tell everyone that he'd been living in Wigan for the past weeks. After "outstaying his welcome" as Tony put it, Tony hurried him outside. Carla followed, and became suspicious by the angry words exchanged as Tony pushed him into a Wigan-bound cab with Jed's cat which Emily had found & looked after for him. Carla began to get suspicious of Tony, so she decided to visit Jed. They went out for something to eat and Carla told Jed she found out what Tony had done to him. Jed begged Carla not to tell Tony about the visit and she promised not to. When she discovered the marks on his neck, she asked him what happened but Jed got upset and ran off. When Carla confronted him about the mark on the old man's neck, Tony claimed Jed had attempted suicide. Then with more lies, Tony said he had given Jed a home because he felt sorry for him and guilty that he had pushed Jed so far. Tony then phoned Jimmy and sent him to sort Jed out. When Jed returned to his flat, Jimmy confronted Jed and warned him not to tell Carla or anyone. Jed was shocked and upset by the threat. Carla later found out from Emily that Jed had another heart attack and was back in hospital. The outcome of the character's fate has never been disclosed.

== In other media ==
In 1988, after the death of actress Margot Bryant, Kenneth Cope hosted the special Minnie Caldwell Remembered. Wearing Jed's flat cap, he knocked on the front door where Minnie had once lived, and called out for "Ma". He then weaved in and out of character as he mentioned Bryant's passing. Interspersed with flashbacks of Minnie's time with Jed and other characters were interviews with Bryant's co-stars such as Doris Speed, Lynne Carol, and Eileen Derbyshire.
