= List of Coronation Street characters introduced in 1960 =

Cast of Coronation Street, 1960

Coronation Street is a British television soap opera/serial, initially produced by Granada Television. Created by screenwriter Tony Warren, Coronation Street first broadcast on ITV on 9 December 1960. The following is a list of characters introduced by Warren upon the series' inception, by order of first appearance.

These include flame-haired siren and series' first sex symbol Elsie Tanner (played by Patricia Phoenix), staunch up-tight battleaxe Ena Sharples (played by Violet Carson), typically middle class town mayor and publican landlady Annie Walker (played by Doris Speed), grumpy war veteran Albert Tatlock (played by Jack Howarth), and university graduate Ken Barlow (played by William Roache) – all of whom would go on to star in the series for twenty years or more. Another long-term character was Minnie Caldwell (played by Margot Bryant), who would remain with the series for 16 years and also in the original line-up was loveable rogue Dennis Tanner (played by Philip Lowrie), who is significant for his 43-year gap between appearances. As of 2025, Roache is the only original character from 1960 remaining in the cast.

Other significant characters to appear this year include Elsie Lappin (played by Maudie Edwards) the original owner of the corner shop and most famous for speaking the first words on the show; Susan Cunningham (played by Patricia Shakesby), Ken's first girlfriend and the subject of a 2010 storyline in which it was discovered she had later given birth to his son; and May Hardman (played by Joan Heath), who became the first character to die in the series on 30 December.

== Elsie Tanner ==
One of the most memorable characters in the series, Elsie (Pat Phoenix) was immediately identified as the siren of the street. She is described as being feisty and bolshy, but with a good heart, and was liable to get hurt by her various men. She would flirt on-and-off for years with Len Fairclough (Peter Adamson). At the start of the series, Elsie worked in the department store "Miami Modes", and had two adult children, Linda (Anne Cunningham) and Dennis (Philip Lowrie), from her marriage to Arnold Tanner (Frank Crawshaw).

== Dennis Tanner ==
Dennis (Philip Lowrie) was the teenage tearaway son of Elsie Tanner (Pat Phoenix), and newly released from prison when the series opens. He works at a seedy club, where he has showbusiness ambitions of which his mother is sceptical. After failing as a singer, he moves to London as a talent scout. At this point, he was written out of the story because of a strike by the actors' union Equity, but made many re-appearances in the series.

== Linda Cheveski ==
Linda Cheveski
- Coronation Street character
- Portrayed by: Anne Cunningham
- Duration: 1960–1963, 1966–1968, 1984
- First appearance: 9 December 1960
- Last appearance: 20 June 1984
- Created by: Tony Warren
- Introduced by: Stuart Latham
- Book appearances: Coronation Street: The Complete Saga; Coronation Street: The War Years
- Spin-off appearances: The Life and Loves of Elsie Tanner (1987)
In-universe information
- Father: Arnold Tanner
- Mother: Elsie Tanner
- Stepfather: Steve Tanner (1967); Alan Howard (1970–1978); Bill Gregory (1984–2004)
- Stepmother: Norah Tanner
- Brothers: Dennis Tanner
- Husband: Ivan Cheveski (until 1984)
- Sons: Paul Cheveski; Martin Cheveski
- Grandfathers: Arthur Grimshaw; Wally Tanner
- Grandmothers: Alice Grimshaw; Amy Tanner
- Uncles: Albert Tanner
- Aunts: Phyllis Bailey; Fay Butler
- First cousins: Gary Bailey; Bernard Butler; Sandra Butler
- Other relatives: Arnley Grimshaw; Colin Grimshaw; Eileen Grimshaw; Julie Carp; Jason Grimshaw; Todd Grimshaw

Linda Cheveski (also Tanner) is played by actress Anne Cunningham between 1960 and 1984. The character was created by series creator Tony Warren as part of the original cast, and she appears in the first episode along with family members including her mother, aging 'good-time girl' Elsie Tanner and her 'lovable rogue' brother Dennis. She is later joined by her Polish husband Ivan, and the young couple are central to early storylines as they cope with Linda's pregnancy affecting their marriage. Cunningham was written out after a year due to a strike at the actor's union Equity preventing new contracts being signed, and the actress chose not to return when the strike ended. This has thus far proved to be Cunningham's last appearance as a member of the regular cast, but she has returned for several short stints since, most recently in 1984.

Linda was the daughter of Arnold and Elsie Tanner. She was born in Annie Walker's living room at The Rovers Return Inn on 8 January 1940, being delivered by Ena Sharples. Linda grew up in the Street, presumably attending Bessie Street School.

Like her mother Elsie, Linda was interested in men and eager to marry. At thirteen, she fought off her mother's boyfriend Chuck Nelson when he tried to rape her. She took a job at Elliston's Raincoat Factory and briefly dated David Barlow before falling for Roy Newman, an American GI stationed at Burtonwood. The pair became engaged but the whirlwind romance did not last.

In 1957, she met Ivan Cheveski, a Polish immigrant, and they married in 1958. Their lives together began happily with a move to Warrington, but Linda quickly grew dissatisfied with the marriage as Ivan wanted to support her and did not want her to work or to begin a family until they were financially secure. When she became pregnant in late 1960, she fled to Weatherfield and moved back in with Elsie and younger brother Dennis. Ivan tracked her down but she was surprised when he liked the idea of having a baby, so they reconciled.

Deciding to stay in Weatherfield for the time being, the Cheveskis bought 9 Coronation Street and moved in. Linda gave birth to a baby boy on 14 June 1961 after two days in labour. Although Linda settled into motherhood well in Weatherfield, Ivan became interested in a job at his friend's firm in Canada. Linda was less keen on emigrating and ripped up the forms. Eventually she agreed, but did not tell Elsie - eventually Ena Sharples told her. The Cheveskis left the country as planned a week later.

Linda, Ivan and Paul returned to the UK for Christmas 1962, and Linda admitted to Elsie she was not happy in Canada. Although Ivan was offered his old job back, they returned to Montreal. During her brief visit, Linda became suspicious that Elsie was having an affair with Len Fairclough.

Linda and Ivan had a second son, Martin Cheveski, born in 1964.

The family returned again in 1966, but although Linda wanted to stay in Weatherfield, Ivan had his heart set on Birmingham. Linda had been having an affair with a Canadian called Mike, and did not know whether or not to return to Ivan.

As Linda was about to follow her husband to Birmingham, Paul went missing - he later turned up, having been rescued from the canal by a mystery man. The incident brought Ivan back to Weatherfield, and the Cheveskis reconciled again, and moved to Birmingham.

Aside from a brief return for Elsie's wedding to Steve Tanner in 1967, Christmas that year and Dennis' wedding the following year, Linda was not seen on the Street again until 1984, when she was entrusted by Elsie to take care of the sale of No.11 after she had left to live in Portugal. By this time, Linda was estranged from Ivan and hoped to stay in Weatherfield, but Elsie was adamant that the house be sold. Linda sold up to Bill Webster for £11,500 and left the Street again.

Following Dennis' death in 2020, Ken Barlow mentions to Dennis' ex-wife Rita Tanner that Linda is still alive and now lives in Toronto.

== Frank Barlow ==
Frank Barlow (Frank Pemberton) is a postman, devoted to his family, but uneasy about his son Ken (William Roache) starting on a university career and acquiring sophisticated ideas. The premature death of his wife Ida (Noel Dyson) brings the two of them together.

== Ida Barlow ==
Ida Barlow (Noel Dyson) is the wife of Frank Barlow (Frank Pemberton) and mother to Kenneth (William Roache and David (Alan Rothwell). She is a dedicated home-maker, who dotes on her family. Her friendship with next-door neighbour Albert Tatlock (Jack Howarth) sometimes causes friction with Albert's daughter Beattie Pearson (Gabrielle Daye). Ida was the first regular character to be killed off.

== Ken Barlow ==
Ken (William Roache) is the elder son of Frank Barlow (Frank Pemberton) and Ida Barlow (Noel Dyson). His clash with his postman father as the first university student in a traditional working-class family forms the opening situation of the series. Although he becomes a political activist with a complex love-life, some critics found the character boring. But Ken went on to become the longest-running character in any soap opera.

== David Barlow ==
David Barlow
- Coronation Street character
- Portrayed by: Alan Rothwell
- Duration: 1960–1961, 1963–1968
- First appearance: Episode 1; 9 December 1960
- Last appearance: Episode 764; 10 April 1968
- Created by: Tony Warren
- Introduced by: Stuart Latham (1960); Margaret Morris (1963); H.V. Kershaw (1964, 1965)
- Book appearances: Coronation Street: The Complete Saga; Coronation Street: The War Years
In-universe information
- Occupation: Footballer
- Father: Frank Barlow
- Mother: Ida Barlow
- Brothers: Ken Barlow
- Wife: Irma Ogden (1965–1970)
- Sons: Darren Barlow
- Grandmothers: Nancy Leathers
- Nephews: Lawrence Cunningham; Peter Barlow; Daniel Osbourne
- Nieces: Susan Barlow; Tracy Barlow (adoptive)

David Barlow was played by Alan Rothwell for a period of eight years between 1960 and 1968.

David was born on 4 July 1942 in Weatherfield, Lancashire. The Barlow family at 3 Coronation Street consisted of David, his academic older brother Ken (William Roache), his mother Ida (Noel Dyson) and his absent father Frank (Frank Pemberton), who was away fighting in World War II until 1945.

David was an apprentice engineer but he wanted to pursue a career in football. He signed for Weatherfield County FC and in his first match he scored the only goal. He was one of the team's best players and in June a Second Division London team wanted to transfer David and offered £1,000 to sign him. David left Weatherfield to play for the team and did not return until 1963, except for a brief trip up for Ida's funeral which he watched from afar. By 1963, he was quite well off financially and did not fit in with the locals.

He next visited over Christmas 1964 and stayed with Ken and his wife, Valerie (Anne Reid). He did not tell them that he was suspended from playing for accepting a bribe, but by February was cleared. He was off the field again in April after tearing a ligament and stayed with the Barlows so he could date Irma Ogden (Sandra Gough), who he started seeing during his previous visit. By now, Frank had moved away, and Ken was David's only family in the area. David announced he was retiring from football but took a job as player-coach for Weatherfield Athletic. He was also contracted to write for a football gossip column in the Weatherfield Advertiser.

Fun-loving Irma was flattered by David's interest in her and was receptive to his advances. He wanted to move the relationship to the next level and asked her to marry him when the street residents went on a trip to the Blue John Mines. Irma accepted.

David had big plans for them to move to Cheshire and Irma's parents, Stan (Bernard Youens) and Hilda Ogden (Jean Alexander), were keen for her to have the well-off lifestyle they could not provide. Irma's parents were an old-fashioned couple and Stan hit Irma when he found David in Irma's bedroom. David convinced Irma they should marry quietly and without telling their families, but everybody found out anyway and surprised them by showing up for a reception.

While playing at a charity football match, David was injured and rushed to hospital, where he was told by the doctor that he would not be able to play football again. The newlyweds had to cancel their plans to buy a house as he could not continue at the club. His football career over, he considered a factory job but hesitated as it was such a step down. Irma convinced him it might be a better idea to buy the Corner Shop in Coronation Street as owner Lionel Petty was selling. At first, he was too proud to accept living in Coronation Street, which caused a brief split between him and Irma. Valerie talked David round, telling him marriage is sometimes difficult and he has to put the effort in.

David had trouble getting to know the Ogdens. In 1966, Irma left the shop to work in the PVC factory across the street as shop work bored her, and David was lumbered with free-loading Hilda as shop assistant. David was never happy in the shop as it was typically where the women of the street went to share gossip. Irma soon returned to work in the shop.

In 1967, David considered standing for Council elections, but Irma hated the idea and he eventually decided not to go through with it.

Irma told David she wanted to have a baby. She got pregnant the same year but suffered a miscarriage. David reminded Irma that they could try again but Irma was devastated and was convinced this meant she could not have children. David was fraught about how to make Irma happy and went to an adoption agency to see if that was an option for them. David still hoped Irma would change her mind but at Christmas the couple fostered Jill Morris for a few days.

In 1968, David was rapidly growing tired of the shop, and aspired to return to football, still being young enough to have a good career ahead of him. Despite his earlier injury, he played a game, and his leg was fine. He took this as a sign that he might just be able to return to the sport full-time, for a team in Australia, but Irma was dead against it - the prospect of living somewhere where they did not know anyone appealed to David much more than it did to Irma. However, when David was offered the position he wanted he took it and set about selling the shop. To interest potential buyers, he had an article published in the Weatherfield Gazette but the tone of the article made it seem as though David and Irma were emigrating because streets like Coronation Street were beneath them. Maggie Clegg eventually bought the shop.

David and Irma became parents in late 1968 when their son Darren was born in Australia.

In 1970, the Barlows were involved in a car accident. David and Darren were both killed, but Irma survived and returned to Weatherfield shortly after the crash.

== Elsie Lappin ==
Elsie Lappin
- Coronation Street character
- Portrayed by: Maudie Edwards
- First appearance: 9 December 1960; Episode 1
- Last appearance: 14 December 1960; Episode 2
- Created by: Tony Warren
- Introduced by: Tony Warren
In-universe information
- Husband: Tommy Foyle (1930–1945); Les Lappin (1947–1952)
- Daughters: Hilda Foyle; Shelagh Foyle

Elsie Castleway (also Foyle and Lappin) was the owner of the Corner Shop on Coronation Street from 1945 to 1960. She is notable for delivering the very first lines of the show, telling Florrie Lindley; "Now the next thing you've got to do is get a signwriter in. That thing above the door will have to be changed." Once Elsie hands over the lease to the shop to Florrie, she leaves the Street.

A variety singer in her youth, Elsie's singing days ended when she injured her vocal chords at twenty-three. In 1930, she married widower Tommy Foyle and ran the Corner Shop in Coronation Street with him until his death in 1945. They had two children together, Hilda and Shelagh. Elsie enjoyed working behind the counter and took over the running of the shop when Tommy was confined to bed after a stroke.

When rationing laws were in place during World War II, Elsie helped her neighbours by buying black market goods to supplement their allotments. Elsie's scheme was rumbled by the police and she was fined.

The war ended on 8 May 1945, but as the other Street residents celebrated, Tommy died from a heart attack. An invalid in his later years, Tommy had urged Elsie to remarry so she would not have to run the shop alone after his death, and although she could cope perfectly well at the shop Elsie did get married again, to Les Lappin in 1947. Elsie was a widow again in 1952 when Les died from a heart attack.

Hilda and Shelagh remained at the shop until 1957 and in 1960 Elsie decided to retire. Buying a bungalow at Knott End, she sold the shop to Florrie Lindley. After the sale, Elsie remained for a few days to show Florrie the tricks of the trade and warn her about the neighbours.

== Florrie Lindley ==
Florrie Lindley
- Coronation Street character
- Portrayed by: Betty Alberge
- Duration: 1960–1965
- First appearance: 9 December 1960; Episode 1
- Last appearance: 2 June 1965; Episode 467
- Created by: Tony Warren
- Introduced by: Tony Warren
In-universe information
- Father: Arnold Arkwright
- Mother: Nellie Arkwright
- Husband: Norman Lindley
- First cousins: Alan Mather

Florence Lena 'Florrie' Lindley is one of the original characters of Coronation Street.

Shy, retiring Florrie was a barmaid at the Farrier's Arms on Collier Street for "a tidy while" before moving from Esmerelda Street to Coronation Street in 1960, buying the Corner Shop from Elsie Lappin and renaming it "Lindley's Provisions". She was worried about moving to a place where she did not know anyone and told the neighbours that she was a widow, when in fact she was separated from Norman Lindley who had left for engineering work in India.

Her first few days in the shop were marred when she was caught by the police selling firelighters after closing time. She was fined £1 in court, but she was mainly worried about the local newspaper carrying the story and sullying her reputation.

Florrie settled in well, making a few friends such as Elsie Tanner and Albert Tatlock, and she hoped romance would be on the horizon with widower Harry Hewitt, but he was largely oblivious to her interest and ended up marrying barmaid Concepta Riley shortly after her arrival. She had no close friends in the street and usually went to bingo when she was lonely.

Sometimes Florrie had trouble paying her suppliers, so to generate a regular source of income, Florrie rented out the flat above the shop, while she lived in the accommodation behind the shop. The first tenants were Phil Braithwaite and Norman Dobson, and they were followed by Sheila Birtles and Doreen Lostock.

In 1962, Florrie and Elsie went on a few blind dates together. Elsie was more experienced at dating than Florrie and still acted youthfully when actually both were the same age. Florrie ended up seeing Frank Barlow when they were both stood up, but they kept their meetings secret at first as Frank was also recently widowed. His intentions were never more than honourable and it soon dawned on Florrie that Frank wanted them to be just close friends. Florrie poured her heart out to him but he still would not open up to her and he later admitted that he was not interested in her romantically. To save face, Florrie said she felt the same. They remained friends.

After one trip to the bingo with Emily Nugent in 1963, Florrie won £100 but was mugged. She was relieved when Jerry Booth got her handbag back.

In 1964, Florrie decided to make some changes to the shop. She opened a sub post office and moved the door to stop the draughts. She took on Dennis Tanner as assistant but he was not up to the job and was replaced by Irma Ogden. However, Florrie was trying to distract herself from the loneliness she felt and occasionally she lashed out at Irma. One particularly bad day saw Florrie have a breakdown in the shop, throw a tin through the shop window, and collapse in a sobbing heap.

Shortly afterwards things picked up as Florrie returned to the shop against her doctor's orders and she started seeing Irishman Tickler Murphy. Tickler was interested in the shop and kept up the relationship until Florrie started talking about marriage, too soon apparently as he was afraid of commitment and fled back to Ireland.

In 1965, Florrie's estranged husband Norman tracked her down and appeared at the shop, seeking a reconciliation. The neighbours were stunned that Florrie was not a widow as she had always claimed. Florrie was not sure how to react to him, as he said if she did not go to Canada with him they might as well get a divorce.

Norman's head was turned by Elsie Tanner, and they went out while Norman laboured under the impression that Florrie was going to turn him down. Florrie deliberated over it but eventually went to Canada with Norman after all.

== Ena Sharples ==
Ena (Violet Carson) is the widowed caretaker of the Mission Hall, and also the local gossip, casting judgment on what she sees as the immoral behaviour of her neighbours in the street, notably Elsie Tanner (Pat Phoenix), with whom she feuds regularly. But as she spends her evenings drinking with her old schoolfriends Martha Longhurst (Lynne Carol) and Minnie Caldwell (Margot Bryant), she in turn comes under criticism from lay-preacher Leonard Swindley (Arthur Lowe).

== Annie Walker ==
Annie (Doris Speed) was the landlady of the Rovers Return Inn - immaculately kept, regarded as snobbish and condescending, yet still liked and respected by the other characters, who seemed to need a queenly figure on the scene. She and her mild-mannered husband Jack (Arthur Leslie) remained a popular double-act for years; their two children were Billy (Ken Farrington) and Joan (June Barry).

== Albert Tatlock ==
Albert (Jack Howarth) is a grumpy retired widower with nothing to do, except work on his allotment and talk about his service in World War I. However he is good friends with his next-door neighbours the Barlows, and is especially pleased when Ken Barlow (William Roache) marries his niece Valerie (Anne Reid). He was a regular at the Rover's Return, where he would call for "half a stout".

== Susan Cunningham ==
Susan Cunningham
- Coronation Street character
- Portrayed by: Patricia Shakesby
- Duration: 1960–1961
- First appearance: 9 December 1960; Episode 1
- Last appearance: 6 January 1961; Episode 9
- Created by: Tony Warren
- Introduced by: Tony Warren
- Book appearances: Coronation Street: The Complete Saga
In-universe information
- Sons: Lawrence Cunningham
- Grandsons: James Cunningham
- Granddaughters: Chloe Cunningham

Susan Cunningham attends university with Ken Barlow and becomes his first girlfriend. She appears in the very first episode of Coronation Street and makes her last appearance in early 1961.

Susan Cunningham was a contemporary of Ken Barlow at Manchester University who unwittingly caused trouble at home for Ken. Ken arranged to meet her for drinks at the Imperial Hotel, where his mother was employed as a kitchen hand. Ken's father Frank objected to Ken spending money in the same place his mum worked hard to earn it and forbade Ken from meeting Susan. When Ken did not show, Susan drove to Coronation Street to see if he was alright. Ken's university education had turned him into "a proper stuck-up little snob", as Albert Tatlock put it - "snooty" was the simple way in which Ken's father, Frank, defined Ken's change in attitude. Thus, Ken gradually became embarrassed about his surroundings; his contemporaries lived in more affluent areas and he was put out when Susan arrived at No.3, the family home. Susan realised this but soon put his mind at rest: she liked Ken for himself and was not bothered by his home. Ken and Susan split up in 1961, shortly after they took part in a "Ban the Bomb" protest, as they felt that their backgrounds were too different.

Some time later, Susan discovered that she was pregnant and wrote to him, asking if he wanted to try again with their relationship, but the letter was misplaced and Ken did not read it or become aware of its existence. Her son, Lawrence Cunningham (Linus Roache), was born later that year. Lawrence went on to become an English lecturer and had two children of his own, James Cunningham (James Roache) and Chloe, with Ken none the wiser until August 2010 when Susan's letter was found behind a skirting board at No.3. By this time, Susan had been dead for several years but the discovery of the letter prompted Ken to contact Lawrence and on meeting him, it became obvious to Ken that Lawrence was his son. Ken began to bond with his son but after discovering that Lawrence was homophobic and disapproved of his son James' homosexuality, Ken cut all contact with him, angry that he would disown his own son for being different.

== Ivan Cheveski ==
Ivan Cheveski
- Coronation Street character
- Portrayed by: Ernst Walder
- Duration: 1960–1963, 1966–1967
- First appearance: 14 December 1960; Episode 2
- Last appearance: 27 December 1967; Episode 734
- Created by: Tony Warren
- Introduced by: Tony Warren
- Book appearances: Coronation Street: The Complete Saga
In-universe information
- Father: Kazimierz Cheveski
- Mother: Biasia Cheveski
- Wife: Linda Tanner (until 1984)
- Sons: Paul Cheveski; Martin Cheveski
- Uncles: Rizard Cheveski

Ivan Cheveski played by actor Ernst Walder until 1967. He is a Coronation Street resident in the early 1960s, and the husband of Elsie Tanner's daughter Linda. He and Linda originally move to Warrington but buy a house in Coronation Street when Linda wants to be closer to her family. Ivan, Linda and their newborn son Paul move to Canada in 1961, making the occasional visit to Weatherfield on their return to the UK in 1966.

Born in Poland, Ivan and his family left their home during the war as Ivan's grandparents' shop was burned down by the Nazis when they were found to be harbouring a Jewish doctor. After the war, Ivan emigrated to the UK, and found a home in Warrington with his uncle Rizhard.

On 1 April 1958, Ivan married eighteen-year-old Linda Tanner and the pair settled in Warrington. Hard-working Ivan saw it as his duty to provide for his wife and preferred that Linda did not work. Linda fled to her hometown Weatherfield to stay with her mum Elsie Tanner, telling her she was not returning to Ivan, but when he followed her to get her back, she admitted she was pregnant. Ivan was thrilled and agreed to stay in Coronation Street - Ivan bought No.9 and the couple moved in.

While Linda and Elsie prepared the house for the baby, Ivan concentrated on money. He worked in Warrington, and kept up the job while living in Weatherfield. For extra money, he took an evening job as potman at the Rovers Return Inn. Linda convinced Ivan to take a day job in Weatherfield, at an ironworks.

In June 1961, Linda gave birth to a baby boy - Ivan wanted to name him Rizhard after his uncle, but they settled on Paul.

The new parents were worried when Paul developed a lingering chesty cough, and it made them realise how unhealthy living in the inner city was. When Ivan received a letter from one of his workmates in Canada, he became taken with the standard of living his friend had and when offered a job that would see him earn just as much as his friend, Ivan convinced Linda that they should emigrate. Linda agreed, for better or worse, and the family moved.

The Cheveskis made several return visits to Weatherfield, including once for Christmas in 1962 and again in 1966 when Ivan had set his mind on moving to Birmingham. The marriage was in crisis as Linda had had an affair with a Canadian and returned to Weatherfield. Ivan got a job in Birmingham and waited for Linda to come to her senses. It took an accident in which Paul fell into a canal to bring Ivan up to Weatherfield, and the Cheveskis got back together after all. Ivan was furious when he found out that councillor Len Fairclough had voted against the erection of a fence by the canal, and hit him when drunk, blaming him for what could easily have killed his son.

Ivan and Linda had a second son, Martin, in 1964 and stayed in Birmingham, next visiting for Elsie's wedding to Steve Tanner in 1967.

In 1984, Ivan and Linda split up, apparently for good.

== Harry Hewitt ==
Harry Hewitt
- Coronation Street character
- Portrayed by: Ivan Beavis
- Duration: 1960–1965, 1967
- First appearance: 14 December 1960; Episode 2
- Last appearance: 6 September 1967; Episode 702
- Created by: Tony Warren
- Introduced by: Tony Warren
- Book appearances: Coronation Street: The Complete Saga
In-universe information
- Father: Thomas Hewitt
- Mother: Mary Hewitt
- Sisters: Alice Burgess; Frances Hewitt
- Wife: Lizzie Harding (1948–1959); Concepta Riley (1961–1967)
- Sons: Christopher Hewitt
- Daughters: Lucille Hewitt
- Grandfathers: Samuel Hewitt; Alfred Makepiece
- Grandmothers: Dolly Hewitt; Ivy Makepiece

Harry Hewitt is played by actor Ivan Beavis.

Harry Hewitt was the second of Thomas and Mary Hewitt's children, born on 24 February 1921. Like his older sister Alice, he was educated at Hardcastle's Factory School, which later became Bessie Street School, before going out to work at fifteen and landing a job as a clippie on the newly established Weatherfield Bus Service.

Harry and Alice both suffered from Mary's mental problems. During the Depression, Thomas had been so desperate for work that he joined a raid on Elliston's Raincoat Factory, only to be caught by the police and imprisoned. By the time he returned home, Mary had changed into resentful and angry woman, but her problems were ignored until the night Harry returned home from a pub crawl after receiving his first wage from the buses. As he stumbled into the house blind drunk, Mary came charging down the stairs in her nightgown, a carving knife in her hand, and started slashing at her son in a psychotic episode. While the neighbours held her down, the doctor was called and Mary was carted off in a van. She spent the rest of her life in a mental asylum, dying in 1936. Harry, who had sustained cuts to his arms in the attack, did not attend the funeral.

Thomas Hewitt was not particularly close to either of his children, and after war broke out, was ashamed of Harry not being accepted into service (due to foot problems). In June 1940, Alice's husband Sam Burgess was killed in battle, and Thomas shamed his son into enlisting. Harry rarely visited Weatherfield during his leave from service, preferring to stay with his sister, but returned briefly for his favourite cousin Sally Todd's wedding.

Living with his father after the war, Harry returned to the buses, where he was promoted to conductor. One of the new clippies was Nellie Briggs, with whom Harry arranged a double date, with his mate Len Fairclough and her friend Lizzie Harding making up the numbers. Harry and Len quickly realised they were both after Nellie and Harry ended up going for Len when he made a play for Nellie first, only to be knocked to the floor by Len. It was only when Lizzie leaned down to nurse his bloody nose that Harry noticed that she was not bad either, and arranged a date!

Harry and Lizzie were married in 1948, and in 1949 their daughter Lucille was born. With Thomas's death in 1947, the Hewitts remained at 7 Coronation Street, now the third generation of their family to inhabit Coronation Street.

The Hewitts led a peaceful life in the Street until the cold winter of 1959, when Lizzie was hit by an out-of-control bus which had skidded on the ice. Harry latterly comforted the driver, before being informed by Ena Sharples that it was his own wife who had been hit in the crash. Harry tried for some months to look after Lucille on his own but, despite help from his neighbours, he realised he was unable to properly support her alone and so he applied to the council to take her into care. When the day arrived for Lucille to go to the children's home, Harry was almost as distressed as Lucille, feeling the sense of loss from his daughter's departure almost as much as he had with Lizzie.

Lucille, unwilling to spend Christmas in the orphanage, walked all the way to Coronation Street in late December 1960, convincing Harry to let her stay at least until after Christmas. Harry arranged for his neighbour Esther Hayes to look after Lucille when he was away at work. For a short while the following year Harry's sister Alice moved into his home to help look after Lucille, but neither party enjoyed the arrangement and shortly afterwards Alice left to take a housekeeping job elsewhere. Harry was not short of female attention though, as local shopkeeper Florrie Lindley and one of his colleagues Eileen Hughes fought over his attentions. Harry was not romantically attracted to either lady.

The barmaid of the Rovers Return, Concepta Riley, also returned to Weatherfield from her native Ireland in 1960. A flirtation sprang up between Concepta and Harry, with Harry taking Concepta to the Bus Depot Dance. While on a coach trip to Blackpool Harry proposed to Concepta, who accepted. Despite her family's initial reservations due to Harry being a Protestant, Harry and Concepta were married on 1 October 1961 in a Catholic ceremony, with Concepta's parents' blessing. The couple honeymooned on the Isle of Man.

Harry did not settle down easily into his second marriage. Arguments over furniture and Harry's tendency to spend the evenings drinking with Len Fairclough followed.

Concepta found she was pregnant and Harry found himself father to a son, Christopher. During a party to celebrate the first wedding anniversary of Harry and Concepta, Christopher went missing while in Lucille's care. His disappearance sparked a police search, and the empty pram was discovered on waste ground. After being questioned by the police, Lucille admitted to Harry that she had left Christopher with a girl from her class, Brenda Cowan, while she was in Gamma Garments. Elsie Tanner eventually found Christopher alive and well with Joan Akers, whose own baby had died, and convinced her to return the baby to the Hewitts herself. Throughout the crisis, Harry remained a tower of strength and supported Concepta and Lucille.

In 1963, when Harry became ill with a chesty cough, Concepta began considering a move to the Irish countryside, making a living by buying her father's garage-cum-grocers. Harry was immediately won over and handed in his resignation at work, but when faced with Lucille's refusal to move, he changed his mind. Concepta threatened to move on her own, but after a row with Harry and Lucille, she backed down and resigned herself to a life in Weatherfield. After a month on the dole, Harry got a new job as a chauffeur for Amalgamated Steel.

The following August, Concepta's father's failing health forced him into retirement, and Concepta once again pushed Harry to move to Ireland to take over the business. History repeated itself as Harry was caught between two women, with Concepta and Lucille equally stubborn in their opposing positions. However, Harry realised that Concepta was not going to let the matter drop a second time and made preparations to emigrate. Annie Walker, Concepta's former employer at the Rovers, offered to take Lucille in as the Walkers' ward so that she could finish her schooling in Weatherfield, an offer graciously accepted by the Hewitts. Although Harry was unsure about leaving Lucille behind, Lucille's acceptance of her new situation did much to allay his fears.

Harry returned to Weatherfield the following year to escort Lucille to her new family home only to find that his daughter, now a young, independent woman, had a job and no intentions of leaving Lancashire. Harry decided to respect her wishes and for the time being she remained with the Walkers.

The Hewitts returned to Weatherfield one last time in September 1967, to attend the wedding of Elsie Tanner to Steve Tanner. After the wedding, Harry and Len went to visit an old mate in Len's van. En route, the van broke down, and Harry tried to repair it himself, jacking up the van with bricks. While underneath, the bricks slipped and Harry was crushed. He died in hospital.

== Esther Hayes ==
Esther Hayes
- Coronation Street character
- Portrayed by: Daphne Oxenford
- Duration: 1960–1963, 1971–1972
- First appearance: 14 December 1960; Episode 2
- Last appearance: 5 April 1972; Episode 1171
- Created by: Tony Warren
- Introduced by: Tony Warren
In-universe information
- Father: Sidney Hayes
- Mother: Alice Hayes
- Brothers: Tom Hayes; Fred Hayes
- Sisters: Ada Harvey

Esther Hayes is played by Daphne Oxenford. Esther, a spinster who spent many years looking after her mother, was living alone at Number 5 Coronation Street by December 1960. She is one of the few non-Mancunian characters in the early years of the show. Esther was a kind and friendly person who would come to the aid of anyone who had a problem. During her time on the street she was a listening ear to the likes of Christine Hardman, Ken Barlow and Lucille Hewitt. She moved into a luxury flat on the other side of Weatherfield in 1962 (the character having been dropped after an Equity strike), although she returned to the street for different occasions, her last visit was for the wedding of Emily Nugent and Ernest Bishop in 1972.

== Jack Walker ==
Jack Walker
- Coronation Street character
- Portrayed by: Arthur Leslie
- Duration: 1960–1970
- First appearance: 14 December 1960; Episode 2
- Last appearance: 24 June 1970; Episode 983
- Created by: Tony Warren
- Book appearances: Coronation Street: The Complete Saga; Coronation Street: The War Years
In-universe information
- Occupation: Pub landlord (former)
- Father: Amos Walker
- Mother: Joan Walker
- Brothers: Arthur Walker; Jim Walker; Fred Walker; Ernest Walker
- Sisters: Louise Walker; Alice Walker; Gertie Walker
- Wife: Annie Beaumont (1937–1970)
- Sons: Billy Walker
- Daughters: Joan Davies
- Aunts: Mabel
- First cousins: Sarah
- Other relatives: Tom Walker; Mavis Walker

John "Jack" Walker is portrayed by Arthur Leslie between 1960 and 1970. Jack was born on 26 April 1900 in Accrington, Lancashire. He was born to parents Joan and Amos, who was a veterinarian. Jack married the love of his life Annie Beaumont in 1937, and shortly afterward the couple bought the Rovers Return Inn. They ran it together and Annie gave birth to a son, Billy, in 1938 and later a daughter Joan, the apple of Jack's eye. Jack soon had to go and fight for his country in the Second World War and Annie was left to run the pub until Jack returned. Jack was a long-suffering husband as Annie was a snob and saw herself as a more educated person than the rest of the people on Coronation Street, Jack had to put up with Annie's antics and enjoyed watching his daughter Joan marry in 1961.

Jack and Annie were offered the Royal Oak by the brewery but they decided that their heart belonged in the Rovers Return. In 1964, Annie left Jack after she suspected him of cheating on her. Jack remained calm as he knew that her accusations were untrue and he had not been having an affair. Annie soon realized this and returned to the Rovers. Three years later, Annie again suspected that Jack was having an affair, this time with Elsie Tanner in 1967, but Annie had incorrectly interpreted the situation as Jack wanted Elsie to make some clothing for Annie. Jack also helped his good friend Ena Sharples recover from the death of her daughter in 1967.

In 1969, the residents of Coronation Street arranged a trip but the coach crashed and Jack was left in a bad way, which left Annie in tears but Jack recovered in time to serve behind the bar again. Jack and Annie had run the Rovers for 33 years when Jack fell ill and went to stay with his daughter Joan in Derby. Jack died of a heart attack while at Joan's house. His death was the result of actor Arthur Leslie dying from the same cause. He was the first main character on Coronation Street to be written out due to the death of the actor who played them, so it was a huge shock at the time. Out of respect for Leslie's family, Jack's funeral took place off-screen, and his death (unlike those of future characters who were written out for the same reason) was presented as a known fact to the main characters from the beginning of Episode 987 (broadcast 8 July 1970), and did not dominate the storyline. Jack left a devastated street of residents and a heartbroken wife, but as he would have wanted, the Rovers remained open and Annie continued to be landlady for another 13 years.

== Martha Longhurst ==
Martha (Lynne Carol) was one of the three gossips of the Snug Bar, along with the aggressive Ena Sharples (Violet Carson) and the self-effacing Minnie Caldwell (Margot Bryant). They made such a good comedy team that it was claimed that they could get laughs without comic dialogue. Martha becomes the cleaner at the pub and suffers embarrassment when old schoolfriend Ted Ashley (Jerold Wells) revisits Weatherfield to catch up with old friends, and she mistakenly thinks he is courting her.

== Minnie Caldwell ==
Minnie Caldwell
- Coronation Street character
- Portrayed by: Margot Bryant
- Duration: 1960–1976
- First appearance: 14 December 1960; Episode 2
- Last appearance: 7 April 1976; Episode 1589
- Created by: Tony Warren
- Introduced by: Stuart Latham
In-universe information
- Occupation: Mill Worker
- Father: Bob Carlton
- Mother: Amy Carlton
- Sisters: Lettie Carlton
- Husband: Armistead Caldwell (1925–1935)
- First cousins: Bertha; Ethel Broadbent

Minnie Caldwell is one of the original characters in the long-running British soap opera Coronation Street.

Minnie, played by Margot Bryant from 1960 to 1976, was a timid and lovable elderly woman who went about with the more dominant characters of Martha Longhurst and Ena Sharples. Minnie was known to be very indecisive, which often led Ena to label her as slow-witted or "daft". Minnie originally lived with her (unseen) domineering mother, Amy Carlton. When Amy died in 1962, aged 94, Minnie moved from 15 Jubilee Terrace to 5 Coronation Street, where she lived with her beloved tomcat, Bobby.

An old flame, Handel Gartside (Harry Markham), came back to woo her in 1970 after he had made a bit of money in an overseas business venture in Quebec. She flirted with him for a while but he was eventually driven off by Billy Walker. Later that year, Minnie's former lodger Joe Donnelli came back to the Street and held her at gunpoint, as he became nervous about being prosecuted for the murder of Steve Tanner. Stan Ogden came to Minnie's house, ready to fight with Joe as he had had a dalliance with his daughter Irma Barlow; when Stan realised what was going on, he offered himself in Minnie's place. Joe agreed to release Minnie (and Bobby), making Stan sing Christmas carols at gunpoint before eventually killing himself.

Minnie considered marrying Albert Tatlock in 1974 but realised that she would be financially burdened by Albert, as Ena erroneously claimed that she would receive just £1,250 for a married couple whilst she already received £775 in pensions as a single occupant; she also found that Albert annoyed her considerably. Eventually, it was the usually indecisive Minnie who called off their engagement.

In 1976, Minnie went to stay with Handel Gartside and later accepted his offer to live with him in Whaley Bridge. She moved away without informing Ena, afraid that Ena would try and talk her out of her decision.

In 2008, former lodger Jed Stone reappeared after an absence of over 42 years, clutching a cat and with a framed photo of Minnie in his home. He and Emily Bishop reminisced about her briefly, where Jed mentioned that he had regretted getting arrested on Minnie's birthday in 1966. Jed also had a box containing photos of he and Minnie together, later visiting her grave.

== Leonard Swindley ==
Swindley (Arthur Lowe) is a lay-preacher at the Mission Hall, organising excursions for the locals and theatricals for charity. Although an experienced actor, Lowe was not nationally famous until he was given this role. Owing to a strike of the actors' union Equity, he had to quit the series after only one year, but returned later.

== May Hardman ==
May Hardman
- Coronation Street character
- Portrayed by: Joan Heath
- First appearance: 16 December 1960; Episode 3
- Last appearance: 30 December 1960; Episode 7
- Created by: Tony Warren
- Introduced by: Tony Warren
In-universe information
- Father: Frank Mason
- Brothers: Edwin Mason
- Sisters: Madge Mason
- Husband: George Hardman (backstory)
- Daughters: Christine Appleby
- Nephews: Reggie Mason

May Hardman (also Mason) is the first resident of number 13 Coronation Street along with her daughter Christine Hardman. Prior to the series' start May had spent a few weeks in a psychiatric hospital, but when she returns home in the third episode she starts suffering headaches and eventually dies in her own home on New Year's Eve, in the seventh episode, from what is discovered to be a brain tumour. This is the first death in the history of Coronation Street.

May Hardman returns from hospital to No.13 and worries what the neighbours will say about her nervous breakdown. May is upset when Christine does not want to see her boyfriend Malcolm Wilkinson anymore. May complains of headaches but Christine thinks she is attention seeking. In pain, May tries to summon help over her headaches but dies in the hallway of No.13, where Florrie discovers her. The hospital gives her belongings to Christine, among them May's wedding ring. She breaks down in Esther's company.

== Lucille Hewitt ==
Lucille Hewitt, played by Jennifer Moss, was the first child character in the series. As Moss was small for her age at sixteen, she was able to act the 11-year-old Hewitt. Escaping from her orphanage, she tries living with her widowed father who has re-married to barmaid Concepta Riley (Doreen Keogh), but responds badly to her stepmother and new half-brother Christopher Hewitt (Stephen Ward). When they move to Concepta's Irish homeland, Hewitt is fostered by Annie and Jack Walker of the Rovers Return, but when her heart is broken, she decides to mend her relationship with Concepta and never comes back to Weatherfield.

== Concepta Riley ==
Riley (Doreen Keogh) has the distinction of being the first barmaid to be seen at the Rover's Return, as employee and confidante of pub landlady Annie Walker (Doris Speed). She marries bus station inspector Harry Hewitt (Ivan Beavis) and becomes stepmother to his rebellious daughter Lucille (Jennifer Moss) and soon mother to his son Christopher, before moving back to her native Ireland.

== Harry Bailey ==
Harry Bailey
- Coronation Street character
- Portrayed by: Ray Mort
- Duration: 1960–1962, 1964
- First appearance: 23 December 1960; Episode 5
- Last appearance: 16 November 1964; Episode 410
- Created by: Tony Warren
- Introduced by: Tony Warren
In-universe information
- Wife: Nellie Fairclough (1963–1964)
- Stepsons: Stanley Fairclough

Harry Bailey (originally credited as Ron Bailey) is an insurance agent who originally arrives in the Street to investigate May Hardman's health, but usually spends most of his day in the Rovers. He returns briefly in 1962 with a different forename, but no explanation is given for the change. In his final stint in 1964 it transpires that he is in a relationship with Len Fairclough's wife Nellie, who subsequently leaves her husband and the pair flee to Nottingham with Nellie's son Stanley. Harry and Nellie later marry off-screen.

== Vera Lomax ==
Vera Lomax
- Coronation Street character
- Portrayed by: Ruth Holden
- Duration: 1960–1961, 1963, 1966–1967
- First appearance: 23 December 1960; Episode 5
- Last appearance: 16 January 1967; Episode 635
- Created by: Tony Warren
- Introduced by: Tony Warren
In-universe information
- Father: Alfred Sharples
- Mother: Ena Sharples
- Brothers: Ian Sharples
- Sisters: Madge Sharples
- Husband: Bob Lomax
- Sons: Colin Lomax
- Grandsons: Jason Lomax
- Grandfathers: Thomas Schofield
- Grandmothers: Mary Schofield
- Uncles: Tom Schofield
- Aunts: Alice Raybould
- First cousins: Tom Schofield Jr. Clifford Schofield; Alan Raybould; Willie Raybould

Vera Lomax is the daughter of Ena Sharples. Vera visits her mother occasionally but does not see her half as much as Ena would like, not that she would admit it. In March 1961, Vera leaves her son Colin in Ena's care for the afternoon (Colin was played by a young unknown, David Jones, who would rise to stardom as one of The Monkees.) At Christmas 1966, Vera makes her last visit; she is suffering from a terminal brain tumour which only Ena knows about. Vera dies a month later, leaving Ena devastated.

In 2004, decades after her death, Norris Cole believes The Kabin is haunted by her ghost. The Kabin stands on the same site as the mission of Glad Tidings. A seance is held but Norris later discovers the "haunting" is caused by damp.

== Malcolm Wilkinson ==
Malcolm Wilkinson
- Coronation Street character
- Portrayed by: Antony Booth
- Duration: 1960–1961
- First appearance: 23 December 1960; Episode 5
- Last appearance: 4 January 1961; Episode 8
- Created by: Tony Warren
- Introduced by: Tony Warren

Malcolm Wilkinson dates Christine Hardman for a few weeks until his decision to stay away following the death of Christine's mother May leads to her ending the relationship.

May is upset when Christine does not want to see her boyfriend Malcolm anymore. Christine accuses Malcolm of being ashamed of her but he invites her to the rugby club dance. She accepts his invite and Malcolm and Christine go to the dance together. After May dies, Christine is annoyed that Malcolm did not come to see her whilst she was mourning and slams the door in his face. They split up.

== Others ==
Character	Date(s)	Episode(s)	Actor	Circumstances
Christine Farrar	9 December	1	Jennifer Moss (uncredited)	A local girl who Elsie Tanner admonishes for playing in her back yard; Christine retaliates by calling Elsie a "silly old bag". Christine was played by Jennifer Moss, to give her experience of live television before making her debut as Lucille Hewitt three episodes later. Christine did not appear in the episode, but her voice was heard.
Policeman	14 December; 15 May 1961; 9 August 1961	2; 44; 69	Bill Croasdale	An undercover policeman who reported Florrie Lindley for breaking licensing laws at the Corner Shop by selling firelighters to them after 7pm.
Policewoman	14 December	2	Penelope Davis	An undercover policewoman who reported Florrie Lindley for breaking licensing laws at the Corner Shop by selling firelighters to them after 7pm.
Sandra Haddon	14 December	1	Jennifer Moss (uncredited)	Sandra Haddon was Lily Haddon's elder daughter and Martha Longhurst's granddaughter. In 1960, Martha went into the Rovers Return Inn to buy a packet of crisps for impatient Sandra, who had fallen and scraped her knee outside the pub. Sandra was played by Jennifer Moss, to give her experience of live television before making her debut as Lucille Hewitt two episodes later. Sandra did not appear in the episode, but her voice was heard.
Children	16 December	3	Pamela Barnett; Sam Clarkson; Doreen Jones; Anthony Lees; Jennifer Smet; Howard Sutcliffe	A group of children who sang Cliff Richard's Living Doll in the street. When Christine Hardman told them to move on, they taunted her about her mother's recent stay in hospital.
Day Nurse	23–28 December	5–6	Christine Shaw	An unnamed Nurse who worked in Weatherfield in 1960. She admitted Vera Lomax and Martha Longhurst to see Ena Sharples when she spent a time in hospital towards the end of 1960 and felt the rough end of Ena's tongue, although she refused to be cowed by her patient, earning Ena's grudging admiration.
Night Nurse	23–28 December	5–6	Louise Jervis	An unnamed Nurse who worked the night shift in a Weatherfield hospital in December 1960 when Ena Sharples spent a short period there. Ena was abusive to the young glasses-wearing girl, calling her "specky four-eyes".
Children	23–28 December	5–6	Elisabeth Butler; Joy Nicholson Stuart Russell	A group of schoolchildren playing by the Mission Hall.
St John's Church Choir	23–28 December	5–6	St John's Church Choir	A choir who sang Christmas carols at the hospital before Ena Sharples, and again on Coronation Street.
Dr Tinsley	30 December – 13 January 1961	7–11	Cyril Luckham	Doctor Tinsley was a Weatherfield GP in the early 1960s. Ena Sharples and Albert Tatlock were among his patients. When Ena walked out of hospital before she was cleared following a collapse in 1960, Dr. Tinsley visited her at the Glad Tidings Mission Hall to check on her, and told her she had senile decay. In early 1961, when Albert had a collapse, Dr. Tinsley made a house call and told Albert he should have somebody to look after him. Within a couple of months, he retired to Bournemouth, mostly for the air for his sick wife, and Dr. Graham took over his practice.
