= Margot Bryant =

English actress (1897–1988)

- Margot Bryant as Minnie Caldwell
- Born: Kathleen Mary Margaret Bryant; 8 March 1897; Hull, East Riding of Yorkshire, England
- Died: 1 January 1988 (aged 90); Heald Green, Greater Manchester, England
- Occupations: Actress and dancer
- Years active: 1910s/1920s–1976 • 1982

Kathleen Mary Margaret Bryant (8 March 1897 – 1 January 1988), known professionally as Margot Bryant, was an English stage and television actress best known for playing Minnie Caldwell in the soap opera Coronation Street from its inception in 1960 until her departure in 1976.

== Early life and career ==
Bryant was born in Hull, the daughter of general practitioner Dr. William Arthur Bryant and Catherine Lewis. Bryant moved to London with her parents on completing her education. There, she became interested in theatre, and appeared in the chorus lines of various productions before moving on to musical comedies. She danced in Fred Astaire's show Stop Flirting in London's Queen's Theatre (1923).

Bryant appeared in a number of films, such as The Cure for Love (1949) and Beat Girl in 1960 and also in a West End role, as Lucy in Gay's the Word at the Saville Theatre. Bryant toured in My Mother Said and later appeared in the show's 1949 television production. She appeared in The Bell Family and in the films I Get Myself Arrested and The Large Rope (1953).

Bryant appeared in various television series including Charlesworth at Large (1958), Champion Road (1958), Probation Officer (1960), and Boyd Q.C. (1960)

=== Coronation Street ===
Bryant's most notable role came later in life, playing the timid, elderly Minnie Caldwell in the soap opera Coronation Street, a role she occupied from 1960 to 1976, over the course of 987 episodes. The character's life tended to revolve around her ginger tomcat, Bobby. Caldwell was a diminutive figure, with a distracted manner and often appeared drinking milk stout in the snug of the soap's public house, the Rovers Return Inn.

The character, consequently, was a put upon companion of her two friends, busybody Martha Longhurst (played by Lynne Carol) and battle-axe Ena Sharples (played by Violet Carson). On the formation of the trio, the show's creator Tony Warren explained, "I noticed that whenever you get tough, old viragos, they've got henchmen. Generally had a talkative one, who could be shouted down, and a silent one, who nodded but was a bit rebellious."

Bryant suffered severe memory loss in March 1976 and was unable to continue in the role; her penultimate episode involved her reading her lines off prompts and on props such as her handbag. Her final episode was broadcast in April 1976, with Minnie leaving the street to live with an old friend, Handel Gartside (played by Harry Markham), in Derbyshire. Bryant never returned to the programme and her character had died off-screen by 2008 (her character being born circa 1901, presumably long before), when returning former character Jed Stone (played by Kenneth Cope) was seen visiting Minnie's grave.

== Personal life and death ==
Bryant was a dedicated performer, always insisting on high standards of professionalism and good manners. She was later distressed by her difficulty to remember her lines as her health deteriorated. She also suffered from depression. According to her co-star Betty Driver (who played Betty Turpin), Bryant "was a little tinker" who "swore like a trooper". Driver, who was friends with both Doris Speed (Annie Walker) and Bryant, said that the pair "were at each other's throats all the time. Doris was staunch Labour and Margot was Tory." After Bryant had left Coronation Street and retired from acting, she went to live in a nursing home, where she was "often visited" by Driver and her sister Freda.

Bryant was later diagnosed with Alzheimer's disease and admitted to Cheadle Royal Hospital in Heald Green, where she remained as an in-patient until her death on New Year's Day 1988. She never married or had children, but had a love of cats. Bryant was close friends with fellow Coronation Street actress Eileen Derbyshire.

Bryant's funeral was held at Manchester Crematorium on 11 January 1988, attended by members of the Coronation Street cast, including Thelma Barlow, Eileen Derbyshire, Julie Goodyear, Barbara Knox and William Roache.
