= Ernst Walder =

Austrian actor

- Born: Ernst Tahedl; 17 November 1926; Salzburg, Austria
- Died: 6 September 2021 (aged 93); Austria
- Occupation: Actor

Ernst Tahedl (17 November 1926 – 6 September 2021), professionally known as Ernst Walder, was an Austrian actor, best known for his role as Ivan Cheveski, one of the original characters in the long-running British television soap opera Coronation Street.

== Early life and career ==
Born as Ernest Tadehl in 1926 in Salzburg, Austria, Walder was the fourth child of an Alpine worker and a housewife. The family lived in a small village in the Austrian mountains. In early 1945, Walder was conscripted into the Nazi army, the Wehrmacht. Following his capture in Italy, he escaped and was hidden by a farmer in the mountains on the Italian-Austrian border. Walder fled along a snowbound mountain path, and after getting lost in a snowdrift, he crossed the border into Austria. Exhausted, Walder collapsed and was found on the roadside by a peasant woman who nursed him back to health.

In 1948, Walder made his acting debut, touring with a troupe in Austria, Germany and Switzerland. He arrived in England in 1952 after escaping from the Russian zone of Eastern Europe, following his arrest for helping refugees to move west. In England, he worked as a valet and butler in a country house in Kent. In 1955, Walder moved to London and joined the Ariel School for Dance and Drama. He appeared in stage productions of Richard III, Albert and Victoria, Once More With Feeling and The Eagle Has Two Heads. His first film role was in 1957 in The One That Got Away. Walder then played numerous German roles in television programmes and in films, before joining Coronation Street in 1960.

== Coronation Street ==
On 14 December 1960, Walder made his Coronation Street debut in the second episode of the newly-launched British television soap opera, playing Ivan Cheveski, the husband of Linda Cheveski (Anne Cunningham). He continued in the role until December 1961, and subsequently made brief appearances from 1962 to 1963 and 1966 to 1967. He was the only member of the original cast without a North of England connection.

Walder's character was the husband of Elsie Tanner's (Pat Phoenix) daughter Linda. He and Linda originally move to Warrington, but buy a house in the eponymous Coronation Street when Linda wants to be closer to her family. Ivan, Linda and their new-born son Paul move to Canada in 1961, making the occasional trip to Weatherfield until their return to the UK in 1966. In 1961, Walder was written out of the serial, along with Anne Cunningham, due to their contracts being unable to be renewed during the dispute between ITV and Equity. They both subsequently returned to the programme.

The Cheveskis made several return visits to Weatherfield, including for Christmas in 1962, and again in 1966 when Ivan had set his mind on moving to Birmingham. The marriage was in crisis, as Linda had had an affair with a Canadian, and returned to Weatherfield. Ivan got a job in Birmingham and waited for Linda to change her mind. It took an accident, in which Paul fell into a canal, to bring Ivan back to Weatherfield, and the Cheveskis got back together. Ivan and Linda had a second son, Martin, in 1964, and stayed in Birmingham, next visiting for Elsie's wedding to Steve Tanner (Paul Maxwell) in 1967. Walder's final appearance was on 27 September 1967.

== Later career ==
After leaving Coronation Street in 1961, Walder starred in two detective films shot in Munich. He appeared in Crossroads in 1964, and had a role in Castle Haven, a drama serial created by future Emmerdale creator Kevin Laffan, between 1969 and 1970. In 1968 he appeared in the episode The Double Death of Charlie Crippen in the series Department S. Walder also appeared in the sitcom Backs To The Land between 1977 and 1978. In 1983, he played a German guard in the World War II-set television series The Fourth Arm.

Walder continued to have theatre roles, including in Clifford Odets' Awake and Sing at the Hampstead Theatre Club in north-west London.

== Personal life and death ==
In the early 1960s, Walder ran an antiques stall on Portobello Road in Notting Hill, west London, with his former Coronation Street screen wife Anne Cunningham, who played Linda Tanner. He was openly gay, and had a relationship with Coronation Street creator Tony Warren during the 1960s. Walder lived with Warren on South Molton Street in Mayfair, and the couple subsequently lived in a cottage in Hayfield, Derbyshire. It was when Walder and Warren were living together that Walder was questioned by the Austrian Police for the attempted murder of a man on the staircases and in the cellars of Panther Strasse number nineteen; the murder charge was subsequently dropped. Warren stayed in Judenburg with Walder's sister, Frieda, and her husband, Willi, during his travels around Austria. Walder subsequently lived in Kensington Gardens Square in Paddington, west London, before moving to Skipton, North Yorkshire, where he resided in the late 1970s. Walder enjoyed painting as a hobby and had an exhibition of his work in Germany in 1962. He was a close friend of fellow Coronation Street actress Pat Phoenix.

In 1966, on his way to filming of The Quiller Memorandum in West Berlin, his flight landed in the Russian sector. Walder was arrested and held for four hours in East Berlin, before being driven to Checkpoint Charlie and released.

Walder's charity work included, in 1969, an appeal for old toys, games and books for children for Oulton Hospital, West Yorkshire, and in 1998, while living in Bradley, North Yorkshire, he raised £1000 for kidney research in memory of Graham Beecroft, a Gargrave resident killed in a road accident.

After retiring from acting, Walder returned to Austria. He died on 6 September 2021, aged 94, in Austria. His death was not reported until Coronation Street writer Daran Little broke the news on social media in June 2022. Little wrote: "Very sad to read of the passing of dearest Ernst Walder. An original C St cast member who quickly became Tony Warren's boyfriend before Tony caught him in bed with another cast member. Ernst used to send my sons chocolates every Christmas and was the loveliest man." Upon his death, Walder's body was transferred to the Anatomical Institute for research purposes.
