= List of Coronation Street characters introduced in 1980 =

In 1980, several new characters were added to the British television soap opera Coronation Street: they were Jeff Bateman, Martin Cheveski, Arnold Swain and Frankie Baldwin. None of them stayed in the show for more than a few months.

== Jeff Bateman ==
Jeff Bateman
- Coronation Street character
- Portrayed by: Peter Dean
- First appearance: 14 January 1980; Episode 1960
- Last appearance: 23 April 1980; Episode 1989
- Introduced by: Bill Podmore
In-universe information
- Occupation: Lorry Driver

Jeff Bateman, played by Peter Dean, made his first appearance on 14 January 1980. Dean appeared as Bateman for seven episodes. Five years later, in 1985, Dean was cast as Pete Beale, one of the original cast, in the newly launched BBC soap opera EastEnders. A role he played for eight years. Jeff Bateman was a lorry driver, who was one of the first customers at the newly refurbished and renamed Jim's Cafe, which was close to the newly opened lorry park.

== Arnold Swain ==
Arnold Swain
- Coronation Street character
- Portrayed by: George Waring
- Duration: 1980–1981
- First appearance: 23 April 1980; Episode 1989
- Last appearance: 11 March 1981; Episode 2081
- Introduced by: Bill Podmore
In-universe information
- Sisters: Flora Swain
- Wife: Margaret Swain (1965–1981); Emily Bishop (1980–1981)

Arnold Henry Swain was a pet shop owner who bigamously married Emily Bishop in 1980. He died in a mental hospital in 1981, after unsuccessfully trying to coerce Emily into joining him in a suicide pact. Arnold was a man who knew what he wanted from life but brushed over the mistakes he made a little too easily. One of his tendencies was to disregard other people's feelings or push them to get his way - something which meant he was not always popular but some forgave him as he was charming. Arnold married Margaret in 1965 and they honeymooned in Shanklin, on the Isle of Wight. The union apparently did not work out as Arnold walked out on Margaret after the honeymoon, but told other people that she had left him. They stayed married, but after a while Arnold started telling people that Margaret was dead (later explaining that in his mind, she was).

By 1980, Arnold owned a pet shop and ran it with his spinster sister Flora, who he also lived with. In April of that year, he met widow Emily Bishop when he hired the Coronation Street Secretarial Bureau to do the shop's books. Arnold took a shine to Emily and asked her out - an invitation the shy Emily accepted when she found a poem Arnold had written which impressed her. Emily had not been with anyone since her husband Ernest died two years previously and had not expected another man to take an interest in her but was very flattered and kept on seeing Arnold, which delighted him. In fact, Emily was so surprised at first that she worried he might be interested in her finances, but her fears were quelled when Deirdre Langton checked Arnold's finances and learned that he had his money well invested. A few weeks later - a short time by any standards - Arnold proposed to Emily. Emily initially turned him down, feeling he was rushing her, but Arnold was persistent, turning to Emily's lodger Deirdre Langton for advice. Emily was resolute that she would never marry Arnold but changed her mind when Deirdre pointed out the benefits of being married again, and that Arnold obviously loved her, so when he asked again, Emily accepted. Their engagement party at 3 Coronation Street (Emily's house) was eventful as a fire at No.11 occurred at the same time, and Hilda Ogden broke up the party to get help and save Elsie Tanner from the flames.

As Emily was religious, she was worried about Arnold's intention to marry in a Registry Office and not a church. The matter was settled with a coin toss, which Arnold won. They got married on 10 September, with best man George Turner getting Arnold drunk the night before, and went on their honeymoon in Newport - at the same hotel where Arnold had taken Margaret. Arnold then began making plans for the future. He firstly insisted that Deirdre and her daughter Tracy vacate No.3 so that he and Emily could have their privacy - but his plans did not stop there; he thought they could do better than Coronation Street and started trying to persuade Emily to move to a country cottage. Emily was not convinced but Arnold started telling the neighbours that they were moving, fobbing Emily off by telling her that she would eventually change her mind.

In October, Arnold was involved in a dispute with builder Len Fairclough when Len fitted a door at No.3 which hurt Emily when she put her hand through the glass, which resulted in her having six stitches in her hand. Arnold confronted Len in the Rovers, threatening to sue him, but decided to settle for not paying him for the work. Len offered to repair the door if Arnold paid the initial fee. With Arnold still refusing, Emily paid the bill herself, but let Arnold believe that Len had repaired it himself for free. He was furious to learn the truth.

The truth about Arnold's previous marriage finally came out in December. When Arnold had to go Birmingham on business, Emily looked after the shop. She was behind the counter when an insurance man called asking her to tell Arnold that Mrs Swain wanted to finish her policy. Emily confirmed that this was referring to his wife, who was very much alive. On Arnold's return, Emily showed him the insurance form and questioned him. Arnold explained that Margaret was dead to him, and that she was never a consideration when he married Emily. Arnold broke down when Emily told him to leave as he was not her husband; he was a bigamist. Arnold then walked out of Emily's life.

Arnold's life then fell to pieces. He was stung to find out Emily had reported him to the police and entered her house in March 1981, waiting for her to return. In the months between, Arnold had been affected by his ordeal and had become obsessed with Emily. Trapping her in the house, Arnold told Emily that he wanted them to die together in a suicide pact so they could be with God. Emily was terrified as he was obviously mentally disturbed but played along with it as when he let her go upstairs to fetch her Bible she ran out of the house. Knowing the game was up, Arnold fled. He later contacted Emily and asked her to meet him at the park, but when she showed up she was accompanied by the police. Arnold was admitted to a psychiatric hospital, where he died at the end of the year, days after Emily turned down an invitation to see him. Arnold left Emily £2,000 in his will.

== Martin Cheveski ==
Martin Cheveski
- Coronation Street character
- Portrayed by: Jonathan Caplan
- First appearance: 16 June 1980; Episode 2004
- Last appearance: 31 December 1980; Episode 2061
- Introduced by: Bill Podmore
In-universe information
- Father: Ivan Cheveski
- Mother: Linda Cheveski
- Brothers: Paul Cheveski
- Grandfathers: Kazimierz Cheveski; Arnold Tanner
- Grandmothers: Biasia Cheveski; Elsie Tanner
- Uncles: Dennis Tanner
- Other relatives: Wally Tanner; Arthur Grimshaw; Alice Grimshaw; Bernard Butler; Sandra Butler; Gary Bailey; Phyllis Bailey; Fay Butler; Jack Grimshaw; Arnley Grimshaw; Colin Grimshaw; Eileen Grimshaw; Jason Grimshaw; Todd Grimshaw

Martin Cheveski was introduced in 1980 as Elsie Tanner's second grandson. Previous scripts had established that Elsie only had one grandson, 19-year-old Paul; however, producers were keen to introduce a younger character and invented a second son for Elsie's daughter Linda. However, despite this decision the show cast an older actor in the role, with Daran Little later stating in his book The Life and Times of Coronation Street that this damaged the character's popularity as 'Jonathan Caplan never managed to look 16'. Little also commented on the irony of producers opting not to introduce Elsie's existing 19-year-old grandson, stating 'the actor would have been perfect for the part'.

Martin was born in Canada in 1964. His parents Ivan and Linda, and older brother Paul, had emigrated there in 1961 but the family returned to England in 1966, specifically Birmingham, where Martin went to school.

After leaving school at sixteen, Martin struggled to find a job and got into rows with Ivan. After a fall-out, Martin decided to stay with his grandma Elsie Tanner in Weatherfield. He made his own way there, arriving unannounced at Elsie's door on 16 June 1980 (although technically as Elsie was not at home, Martin climbed over the back wall and was grabbed by Len Fairclough, who thought he was breaking in). Elsie agreed to Martin living there, with Linda's approval.

As it transpired, Martin had made the right decision, at least on the employment front. He was good with his hands, and Len, who owned the local Builder's Yard, was a close friend of Elsie's and readily agreed to take Martin on as an apprentice. This upset the yard's labourer Eddie Yeats as there was not enough work at the yard for the three of them, and unsurprisingly it was Eddie who faced the chop, having unsuccessfully tried to put Martin off the job.

In August, Martin was repairing the water boiler at Baldwin's Casuals when he took a shine to the new trainee Karen Oldfield. Karen returned his affections and they went to a dance together. They soon fell for each other but a complication then arose in the form of Karen's protective father, who barred Karen from seeing Martin when Martin got Karen drunk on Elsie's gin while entertaining her at No.11 in Elsie's absence. Martin arranged to meet Karen despite the ban but to his shock it was Mr. Oldfield who showed up, to warn him off Karen personally. Karen was still willing to see Martin, but as Elsie would not let them use No.11, Martin used the yard as a meeting place, with them seeing each other there on nights.

The relationship continued. In October, the pair got their ears pierced but Martin took his out when his ear went septic. Later, they were caught together at the yard by the police, resulting in Oldfield finding out that they were still together. With Oldfield threatening Martin with court action, Martin decided to return to Birmingham, deciding that if he could not see Karen then there was nothing for him in Weatherfield. This surprised Oldfield, who agreed to let him see Karen - but warned him about getting her drunk again.

At Christmas, Martin faced a complication as Karen wanted him to celebrate the day with her instead of his family, and threatened to leave him otherwise. Martin left for Birmingham but came back later, deciding to be with Karen after all, but interrupted a date between Karen and Paul Sidall, and shoved Paul across a table at the Rovers. Martin realised he had gone too far and risked pushing her closer to Paul, but after getting an idea from Elsie, bought an engagement ring and proposed to Karen, hoping that a big gesture would show his commitment to her and thus sort out their problems. Karen initially accepted but after consideration returned the ring, telling him they were too young. She also finished with him. Even though it was New Year's Eve, Martin immediately packed his things and returned to Birmingham, telling Elsie he was swearing off girls.

== Frankie Baldwin ==
Frankie Baldwin
- Coronation Street character
- Portrayed by: Sam Kydd
- Duration: 1980–1982
- First appearance: 1 December 1980; Episode 2052
- Last appearance: 4 January 1982; Episode 2166
- Introduced by: Bill Podmore
In-universe information
- Wife: Mary Baldwin (1941–1979); Sue Baldwin
- Sons: Mike Baldwin; Harry Baldwin
- Grandsons: Danny Baldwin; Mark Redman; Adam Barlow
- Other relatives: Jamie Baldwin; Warren Baldwin

Frank "Frankie" Baldwin is the father of factory owner Mike Baldwin. Frankie is a former docker and Cockney wideboy, more so than his son. He is present on the Street between December 1980 and January 1982. He cons barman Fred Gee out of money over a wedding video scam, and conning Fred a second time also managed to con Alf Roberts out of money. The police turn up accusing Fred of distributing blue movies.

In 1981, after repaying his debts to Fred and Alf, he turns up at Mike's flat, apparently having come into money with a blonde he describes as his "secretary". Later that year, the blonde returns to Weatherfield to visit family and Mike asks her to accompany him to a business dinner. Some days later Frankie turns up, takes offence with Mike and leaves for London in early January 1982. He is never seen again on the Street, but news of his death reaches Mike in July 1982, four months after the death of Sam Kydd, the actor who had played the role.

In 2002, Mike reveals that Frankie was 61 when he died of a heart attack on a golf course.
