= Anne Cunningham =

English actress (born 1937)

- Born: Anne Margaret Cunningham; 1937 (age 88–89); Leeds, Yorkshire, England
- Occupation: Actress
- Spouse: Darrol Blake (m. 1965)
- Children: 3

Anne Margaret Cunningham (born 1937) is an English actress, best known for her role as an original cast member of Coronation Street, in which she played Linda Cheveski, daughter of Elsie Tanner (Pat Phoenix).

== Early life ==
Cunningham, an only child, was born in Leeds. As a child, the family emigrated to South Africa. At school, her performance in As You Like It prompted her drama teacher to suggest she should train as an actor in England. The family returned to England when Cunningham was aged 16, and she attended the Rose Bruford College of Speech and Drama, taking a combined teaching and acting course. She is a trained actor and teacher; however, she has never taught.

== Career ==
Cunningham's acting career began at the Bristol Old Vic before she joined the Royal Shakespeare Company in a production of Twelfth Night. She was appearing in Repertory Theatre in Buxton when a casting director from Granada Television came to see the show. A couple of months later, she was asked to audition in Manchester, and was cast in the role of Linda Cheveski in the soap opera Coronation Street, this being her first television role.

Cunningham appeared in the first episode of Coronation Street on 9 December 1960, as Linda Cheveski, daughter of Elsie Tanner (Pat Phoenix) and older sister to Dennis Tanner (Philip Lowrie). The character was a regular for the programme's first year, leaving just as the Equity actors' strike kicked in, causing the character of Linda and her husband Ivan (Ernst Walder) to be written out. Cunningham continued the role in a recurring capacity until 1968, before returning for a brief period in 1984 upon the exit of Phoenix's character. Following Dennis' death in 2020, Ken Barlow (William Roache) mentioned to Dennis' ex-wife Rita (Barbara Knox) that Linda is still alive and now lives in Toronto.

Cunningham appeared on one of the first programmes on BBC2, Impromptu, a light entertainment programme written by David Croft. She also appeared in A World of His Own, in 1964, alongside Roy Kinnear (playing Stanley Blake) as his wife Helen Blake.

Alongside her stage acting, Cunningham has also had numerous television roles, including Z-Cars in 1962, The Avengers in 1966, The Dick Emery Show in 1973, The Fall and Rise of Reginald Perrin in 1976, and Are You Being Served? in the same year. She narrated five episodes of a Play School story in August 1972.

Cunningham's film roles include Doctor in Clover (1966), playing Ella in Bitter Harvest and Judith in This Sporting Life (both 1963). Other stage work includes Lady Percy in Chimes at Midnight, Vera in Come Laughing Home and Amy in Duty Free.

She played Linda Cheveski for the last time in a video special, The Life and Loves of Elsie Tanner, which was made as a tribute to Pat Phoenix following her death in 1986. Cunningham's character, Linda, was the first woman on Coronation Street to give birth, when on 12 June 1961, she had a son, Paul (Marcus Saville). In 2010, she appeared in Coronation Street: 50 Years, 50 Moments.

== Personal life ==
While on the set of A World of His Own, Cunningham met set designer and theatre director Darrol Blake. The couple married in 1965, have three daughters and live in London. Cunningham's daughter, Philippa, was named after her on screen brother, Philip Lowrie. Cunningham has run an antiques shop with her former Coronation Street screen husband Ernst Walder, who played Ivan Cheveski.
