= Bispham Parish Church =

- All Hallows Church, Bispham
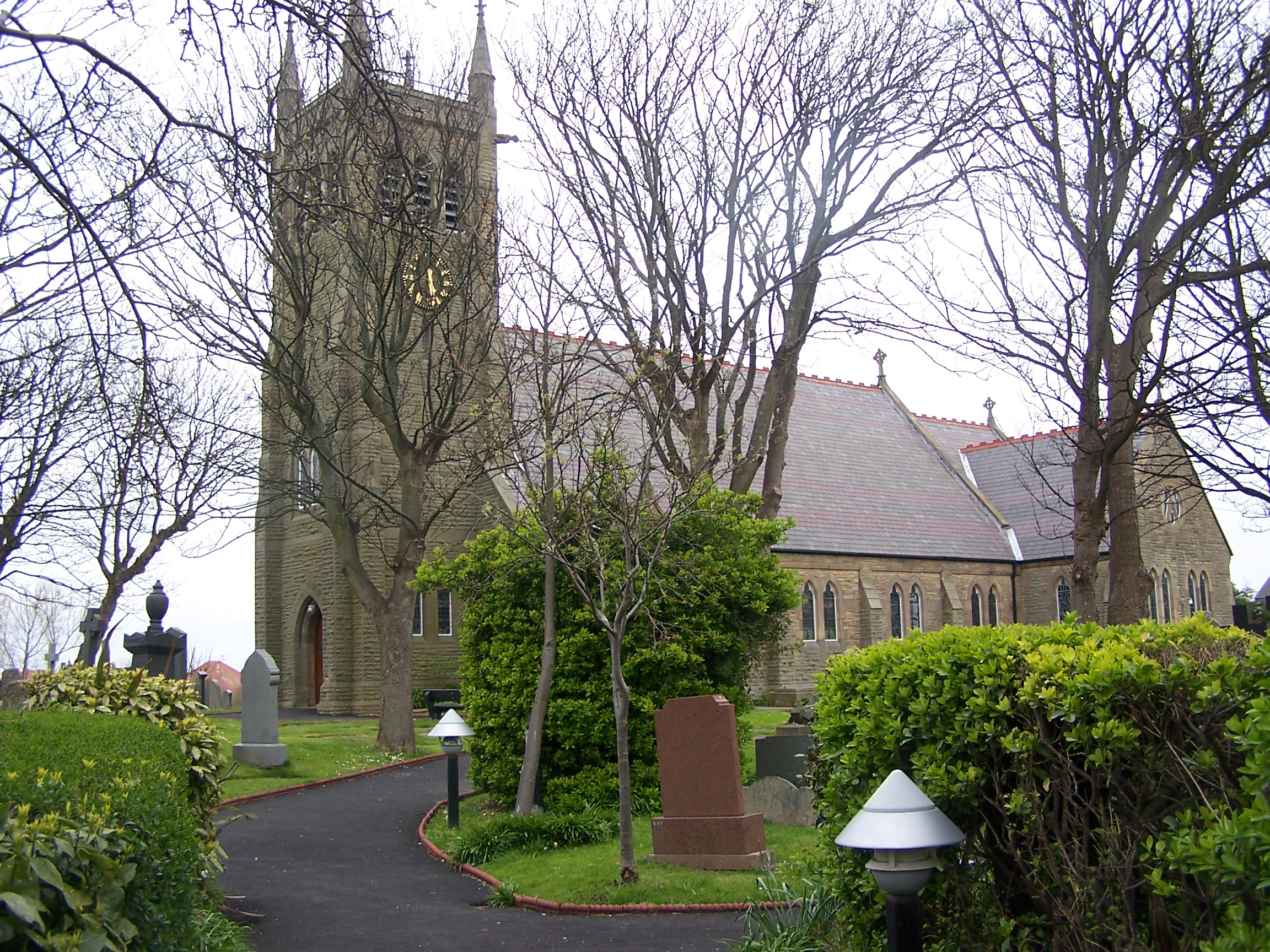

- Bispham Parish Church shown within Blackpool
- OS grid reference: SD 31902 40578
- Location: Bispham, Blackpool
- Country: England
- Denomination: Church of England
- Website: bisphamchurch.co.uk

History
- Consecrated: 1883

Architecture
- Functional status: Parish church
- Designated: Grade II listed

Administration
- Diocese: Blackburn
- Archdeaconry: Lancaster
- Parish: Bispham

Clergy
- Rector: The Revd Jonny Lee

Bispham Parish Church, also known as All Hallows Church, is a Church of England parish church located in Bispham, Blackpool, Lancashire, England, known as the Mother Church of Blackpool. It is part of the Diocese of Blackburn and Blackpool Deanery.

The church building is a Grade II Listed Building. It is the third church on the site and was built in 1883.

Until 1821 the parish church of Bispham was the only place of worship in Blackpool.

== History ==
The earliest reference to the church dates from the reign of King Richard I, when Theobold Walter in 1189 passed on his rights to the churches of Poulton-le-Fylde and Bispham to St Mary's of Lancaster. Another reference in 1345, from the records of the Archdiocese of Richmond, tells of the lamentable state of disrepair of both the church of Poulton and the chapel of Bispham, implying that Bispham was a chapel annexed to the parish of Poulton.

In 1351, in the aftermath of the Black Death, the Archdeacon made a visit to ascertain whether the chapel had sufficient parishioners to make it viable as a place of worship, and also enquired of St Mary's of Lancaster by what right they held the claim to Bispham. The Archdeacon was evidently persuaded not to sell off the chapelery and its lands.

The first mention of Blackpool is found in the Register of Bispham Parish Church in 1602 in which is recorded the Christinary on 22 September of that year of a child belonging to a couple who reside on the bank of the Black Pool.

18th century records show that there existed a church of red sandstone, with a double-gable roof, supported by offal pillars, laid down in the centre of the nave. There was a separate chancel, black oak pews in the nave, with three lancet windows in the east end and a low tower at the west.

In 1773, the pillars were deemed unsafe and removed and the building heightened, but by the middle of the 19th century, the church was in danger of collapse, and in 1883 had to be demolished. A new church of limestone was built on the same site, and during the rebuilding, were discovered a Saxon piscina and a Norman sandstone arch, with chevron carvings, enclosing the twelve signs of the Zodiac. Supposedly, the emblems of Taurus, Cancer and Virgo were excavated, that prompted the current Victorian carving that forms the Zodical frieze over the inner south doorway which contains fragments of the Norman masonry. The building has a five-bay nave, a chancel with transepts and a south-west tower, in a minimally Early English belf style.

=== Present day ===
All Hallows Church is within the Conservative Evangelical tradition of the Church of England, and it receives alternative episcopal oversight from the Bishop of Ebbsfleet.

== Churchyard ==
The churchyard contains the tombs of many shipwreck victims, including the captain and crew of the brig Favourite, which sank off Blackpool in 1865, and passengers from the Ocean Monarch, which caught fire in the Irish Sea in 1848. Also commemorated in the churchyard is the actress Violet Carson, who lived in Bispham and who died in 1983 and gained fame between 1960 and 1980 for her portrayal of Ena Sharples in TV's Coronation Street.

== Sundial ==
The sundial, located in the graveyard, on a one metre high stone shaft, is a Grade II Listed Building. It is said to be the base of a former cross.

== War Graves ==
The churchyard contains war graves of four service personnel of World War I and nine of World War II.
