= Arthur Leslie =

British actor and playwright

- Born: Arthur Leslie Scottorn Broughton; 8 December 1899; Newark-on-Trent, Nottinghamshire, England
- Died: 30 June 1970 (aged 70); Cardigan, Wales
- Other name: Arthur S. Broughton (pen name)
- Occupations: Actor, playwright
- Years active: 1916–1970
- Spouse: Betty Powell (m. 1925)
- Children: 1

Arthur Leslie Scottorn Broughton (8 December 1899 – 30 June 1970), better known as Arthur Leslie, was a British actor and playwright, best known for original character of public house landlord Jack Walker in television soap Coronation Street.

== Early life ==
Leslie was born in Newark-on-Trent, Nottinghamshire, but moved to Lancashire at an early age. He served in the British Merchant Navy, during World War I, where he served aboard convoys in the North Atlantic.

== Career ==
His first job was in 1916 at the Old Queen's Theatre in Farnworth, and he also had a spell as actor-director at the Hippodrome theatre in Wigan. Leslie's best known role is as Jack Walker, genial landlord of the Rovers Return Inn in television soap Coronation Street. Jack ran the pub alongside his wife Annie (played by Doris Speed). The Walkers were extremely popular characters, and both Leslie and Speed were much liked and respected by fellow cast members. Jack appeared in the show from the second episode on 14 December 1960 until his last appearance on 24 June 1970. In addition to acting, Leslie was also a playwright, and wrote under the name "Arthur S. Broughton". One such play, Welcome Little Stranger, enjoyed success in repertory theatre.

== Death ==
On 30 June 1970, six days after his last appearance on Coronation Street, Leslie died suddenly of a heart attack whilst on holiday in Cardigan, Wales. His character, Jack Walker, was the first character to be written out of the soap following the death of the actor who played them, by means that he suffered the same fate. Out of respect for Leslie's family, Jack's funeral took place off-screen, and his death (unlike those of future characters who were written out for the same reason) was presented as a known fact to the main characters from the beginning of the episode broadcast on 8 July 1970, and did not dominate the storyline. Doris Speed considered leaving the programme as well, but was persuaded to stay, which she did until 1983. Leslie is buried in the churchyard of St Stephen on-the-Cliffs in Blackpool. He was survived by his wife of 45 years, Betty Powell, and their son, actor Tony Broughton, who would go on to appear in several episodes of Coronation Street.
