= Champion Road =

British television series

- Genre: Drama
- Written by: Constance Cox
- Directed by: Hal Burton
- Starring: William Lucas
- Country of origin: United Kingdom
- Original language: English
- No. of series: 1
- No. of episodes: 8

Production
- Producer: Hal Burton
- Running time: 30 minutes
- Production company: BBC

Original release
- Network: BBC 1
- Release: 12 September – 31 October 1958

Champion Road is a British eight-part television series that originally aired on the BBC in 1958.

== Main cast ==
- William Lucas as Jonathan Briggs
- Anna Turner as Nellie Greenhalgh
- Joby Blanshard as Alf Burton
- John Paul as AJ Clough
- Jennifer Wilson as Janet Pemberton
- Bryan Hulme as Steven Briggs
- George A. Cooper as Abe Duckworth
- Peter Bryant as Raymond Kempshaw
- Nan Marriott-Watson as Grandma Pilling
- Violet Carson as Mrs Briggs
- Fred Fairclough as Grandfather Briggs
- Jennifer Hales as Geraldine Forbes
- Prunella Scales as Betty Gray
- Brenda Cowling as Miss Doubleday
- Brian Rawlinson as Fred Pennington
- Rex Robinson as Tommy Dog
- Norman Pierce as Joe Hesketh
- John Woodvine as Ben, the Barman
- Jack Howarth as Mr Briggs
- Margot Bryant as Mrs Furness

== Bibliography ==
- Baskin, Ellen . Serials on British Television, 1950-1994. Scolar Press, 1996.
