= Elsie Tanner =

Fictional character from Coronation Street

- Coronation Street character
- Portrayed by: Pat Phoenix
- Duration: 1960–1973, 1976–1984
- First appearance: Episode 1; 9 December 1960
- Last appearance: Episode 2375; 4 January 1984
- Created by: Tony Warren
- Introduced by: Stuart Latham (1960); Bill Podmore (1976)
- Book appearances: Coronation Street: The Complete Saga; Coronation Street: The War Years
In-universe information
- Other names: Elsie Howard; Elsie Gregory
- Occupation: Shop assistant Retail clerk Factory supervisor Machinist; Café manageress Barmaid; Bar owner
- Father: Arthur Grimshaw
- Mother: Alice Grimshaw
- Brothers: Jack Grimshaw
- Sisters: Phyllis Bailey; Fay Butler; Ethel Grimshaw; Connie Grimshaw; Iris Grimshaw; Freda Grimshaw; Nancy Grimshaw; Polly Grimshaw
- Husband: Arnold Tanner (until 1962); Steve Tanner (1967–1968); Alan Howard (1970–1978); Bill Gregory (1984–2004)
- Sons: Dennis Tanner
- Daughters: Linda Cheveski
- Stepsons: Mark Howard
- Grandsons: Paul Cheveski; Martin Cheveski
- Nephews: Gary Bailey; Bernard Butler
- Nieces: Sandra Butler
- First cousins: Arnley Grimshaw
- Other relatives: Colin Grimshaw; Eileen Grimshaw; Julie Carp; Jason Grimshaw; Todd Grimshaw; Billy Platt

Elsie Tanner (also Howard) is a fictional character from the British ITV soap opera Coronation Street, played by Pat Phoenix from the series' inception in 1960 to 1973, and again from 1976 until 1984. Elsie Tanner was one of the original core characters on Coronation Street and appeared in the first episode. She is considered to be an icon in soap history and regarded as one of the greatest ever characters to appear in Coronation Street.

Her final appearance came in January 1984, when Elsie emigrated to Portugal. Phoenix decided to quit the series in 1983 to pursue other projects.

Three years after leaving, Phoenix died, and a few months later, in the VHS special The Lives and Loves of Elsie Tanner, Anne Cunningham returned as Elsie's daughter Linda, hinting about Elsie's previous passing and including archive footage for flashbacks. However, 24 years later, when Philip Lowrie returned as Elsie's son Dennis Tanner, it was revealed that Elsie had died in a car crash, along with Bill Gregory, in 2004 meaning that the VHS release is not part of the canon of the show (on which these events have not been mentioned).

In 2011, it was revealed that she and her son Dennis were related to Eileen Grimshaw and Julie Carp, as Elsie's cousin, Arnley Grimshaw, was their grandfather.

== Development ==
=== Characterisation ===
Elsie is dubbed as the "siren of the street throughout the 1960s". She is described as being feisty and bolshy, but with a good heart, and is also said to have a passion for men, but was hurt by all of them. In her later years she is described as struggling to keep up her glamour and has a series of sleazy one-night stands and dead-end jobs.

=== Departure ===
In 1983, it was announced that Phoenix would be leaving her role of Elsie and was to leave Weatherfield. Her final appearance was screened at the beginning of 1984. Phoenix died of lung cancer in September 1986 at the age of 62. Elsie, her character, died in a car crash, at the age of 81 in 2004 after leaving Weatherfield twenty years earlier, although it was not mentioned in the show until 2011.

== Storylines ==
Elsie Tanner in 1961

At the beginning of the series, Elsie had two adult children, Linda (Anne Cunningham) and Dennis (Philip Lowrie), from her marriage to Arnold Tanner (Frank Crawshaw).

Linda had trouble with her Polish husband Ivan Cheveski (Ernst Walder) and his short temper, but they eventually reconciled and had two sons, Paul (Victoria Elton, Marcus Saville and Nigel Greaves) and Martin (Jonathan Caplan). Coronation Street's creator, Tony Warren, had originally planned the character of Dennis to be rather gritty and a real "bad boy", but actor Philip Lowrie's charm and knack for comedy led to Dennis becoming much more lighthearted. Dennis was shown to be sneaky and up to shenanigans, and embarked on many "get rich quick" schemes to help himself and his mother.

Elsie flirted on and off for years with Len Fairclough (Peter Adamson), but that ended when he married Rita Littlewood (Barbara Knox) in 1977. Even after Len's marriage to Rita, she remained a close friend.

Elsie married an ex-lover from the war, American serviceman Steve Tanner in 1967 (played by Canadian actor Paul Maxwell). Due to Elsie's massive popularity during the 1960s, Steve was given the same surname so that Elsie would not have to change her name. Elsie emigrated to the United States with Steve but returned to Coronation Street after they split up. Steve also returned, attempting to win her back, but was found dead at the bottom of a flight of stairs soon after his return. This led many residents to be in the frame for murdering Steve, but it was later revealed that one of Steve's former servicemen, Joe Donelli (Shane Rimmer), had committed the crime. Now a widow, Elsie married Alan Howard in 1970 (Alan was played by Alan Browning, who would become Patricia Phoenix's real-life husband). This marriage was also rocky; shortly after they married, script-writers bankrupted affluent Alan so Elsie would stay in Weatherfield. Eventually, in 1973, in an unseen plotline that developed off screen, the two went to live in Newcastle-upon-Tyne but Elsie returned alone in 1976 as she and Alan had separated and later got divorced. Elsie was also involved with bookie Dave Smith (Reginald Marsh) in the early 1970s, owner of local football team Weatherfield County FC.

After her third failed marriage, Elsie surrounded herself with youngsters and acted as mother figure to Suzie Birchall (Cheryl Murray) and Gail Potter (Helen Worth), who lodged with her during the late 1970s. Elsie saw a lot of herself in young Suzie, who was somewhat gregarious and enjoyed the company of men, but it was Elsie's relationship with Gail that was inevitably the strongest.

During her time, Elsie took a diverse range of jobs, including shop worker, croupier, machinist, factory supervisor, café worker and model. At the start of the series, Elsie worked in the department store "Miami Modes", before moving on to "Sylvia's Separates" dress shop in the 1970s. She also worked under Mike Baldwin (Johnny Briggs) alongside Vera Duckworth (Liz Dawn), Ivy Tilsley (Lynne Perrie) and Ida Clough (Helene Palmer) at Baldwin's Casuals clothing factory, where she spent some time as supervisor.

A plotline also took Elsie to Torquay: Ron Mather (Joe Lynch - who also played the character Harold Digby in 1975) an Irishman who had worked on the markets and had tried immigrating to Canada. As well as being a championship ballroom dancer, he liked a flutter on the horses. He actually worked as a self-employed taxi driver and one of his fares in August 1978 was Elsie. They fell in love following the break-up of her third marriage.

Tiring of life as a taxi driver, Ron found a job as a chauffeur to a Mr. Frazer. Here was a nasty piece of work who had made his fortune as a Manchester industrialist – and had then retired to Torquay. Ron persuaded Elsie to apply to be Mr. Frazer's housekeeper. At the last minute, Elsie backed out – even the idea of Ron driving a Rolls Royce along the then traffic-bound Fleet Street couldn't tempt Elsie to the English Riviera.

In November 1979, Ron cropped up again, and this time Elsie agreed to take up the still-vacant housekeeper's job. Gail was going to marry Brian, and Ron had agreed to give her away. But Mr. Frazer said he was needed that weekend. Elsie left for Torquay with Ron, planning to return for the wedding, though she fell ill and so both couldn't attend Gail's happiest day. They weren't aware at the time that Gail would have many other happy days, and even more challenging ones…

She finally left Torquay because Frazer had been sexually harassing her, and returned on Christmas Eve 1979. Ron had begged her to stay in Torquay with him, but he had turned a blind eye to Frazer's behaviour in order to keep his job. Feeling betrayed, Elsie ended their relationship and told him to leave.

In late 1983, Bill Gregory (Jack Watson) returned to the Street (she had an affair with him more than twenty years earlier and last saw him in 1970) and confessed to Elsie that he was still in love with her. He asked her to marry him and help him run a wine bar in Portugal. After much agonising and thought, she decided to accept Bill's proposal. On the night she left, Elsie walked down the street and old memories filled her head; squabbles with Annie Walker (Doris Speed) and Ena Sharples (Violet Carson) and fights with her son, Dennis. While clutching photographs of Linda and Dennis, she smiled, knowing that her life in Coronation Street had left her with no regrets. As she entered the taxi that was to take her to the train station, the driver asked her if she was to be away for long. Giving him a knowing smile, Elsie replied: "Ah! Now there's a question!". The taxi drove off into the night as Elsie left Weatherfield forever.

== Reception ==
In Dorothy Catherine Anger's book Other worlds: society seen through soap opera, she brands Elsie a "tarty woman" who has the ability to "attract men like bees to honey". In Larry Warren's book Left at East Gate a First Hand, he joked about the probability of UFO landing being "as unlikely as Elsie Tanner getting into a nunnery" and branded her as having dubious morals. In Women and soap opera: a study of prime time soaps, Christine Geraghty describes Elsie as having open family situations to deal with in her later years. She stated that Elsie always seemed ill-equipped to offer other characters advice on their love lives when they needed it.

== Cultural references ==
"Wrap Her Up", a 1985 single by Elton John and George Michael, mentions Elsie Tanner in a roll call of strong famous women's names at the end of the song.
