= Doris Speed =

English actress (1899–1994)

Doris Speed MBE
- Born: 3 February 1899; Chorlton, Lancashire, England
- Died: 16 November 1994 (aged 95); Bury, Greater Manchester, England
- Occupation: Actress
- Years active: 1905–1988
- Known for: Role of Annie Walker in Coronation Street (1960–1983)

Doris Speed (3 February 1899 – 16 November 1994) was an English actress, best known for her role as landlady of the Rovers Return Inn and later mayor of the fictional Weatherfield, Annie Walker, on the British television soap opera Coronation Street. Speed was one of the original cast members and played this role from the programme's first episode in 1960 until her departure in 1983.

== Early life and career ==
Speed was born in Chorlton, Lancashire (later part of Manchester) on 3 February 1899. As a child, she toured with her parents George, a singer and Ada (née Worsley) Speed, an actress, moving to different schools almost every week. She made her debut at the age of three years old, as she toddled onstage in a nightdress to sing a song about a golliwog. Two years later, she made her acting debut as the velvet-suited infant Prince of Rome in a Victorian melodrama, called The Royal Divorce. Speed was later quoted as saying "Acting was all I ever wanted to do".

Speed took a course in shorthand and typing at a local technical college in 1915, and shortly after finishing it, took a job with Guinness in Manchester to support her parents' stage careers. She joined Guinness as a clerk, but over her 41 years working for the company, rose to become personal assistant to the regional manager. However, she was also an active member of the local amateur dramatics group, The Unnamed Society, who were well regarded, and she received good notices in The Manchester Guardian for her roles with the group from 1937 onwards. Appearing in The Unnamed Society's 1949 production of Hamlet, the paper's reviewer noted that Speed "acted splendidly" playing the Queen.

She also worked with Chorlton Rep and other companies. On stage, she performed a number of Shakespearean parts, led the chorus of women in Murder in the Cathedral, played Mrs Sullen in The Beaux' Stratagem, the mother in The Lady's Not For Burning and in Amphitryon 38 by Jean Giraudoux, appeared as the Greek beauty Leda.

Following the end of the Second World War, Speed appeared in hundreds of radio plays, and subsequently went into television. In ITV's early days on air, she was in two Granada Television series: Shadow Squad, a 1950s police television series, in an episode written by Tony Warren, and a year later, in its spin-off, Skyport, as the tea lady. Speed was in two television plays, The Myth Makers and Vital Statistics, in addition to the 1959 Hammer Studios Stanley Baker vehicle Hell Is a City, set in her native Manchester.

== Coronation Street ==
In 1960, while Speed was appearing in the BBC radio serial The Tenant of Wildfell Hall (based on Anne Brontë's novel) and appearing on stage in Bristol, she was asked to audition for the role of Annie Walker in Tony Warren's new series, Coronation Street. He had written the part specifically for her, having admired her as an actress when he was aged 12 in the late 1940s. The pair had already met, when she worked on the BBC's Children's Hour radio programme. However, Speed turned down two auditions for Coronation Street, as "it seemed such a long way to travel" from Bristol. 57 actresses had already unsuccessfully auditioned for the role before Speed.

She was said to have based her performance on her Aunt Bessie, who led the Speed family in Christmas charades and had "a withering look". According to The Daily Telegraph, "Annie Walker struck a chord in the national psyche, as the embodiment of the genteel social climber, an icon of the proud petit-bourgeois tidiness which was subject to such virulent cultural attack in the 1960s." Speed herself described the character as "always a silly vain woman".

Speed was originally on a three-week contract, first appearing in the December 1960 opening episode. However, she went on to appear in 1,746 episodes of Coronation Street, and was one of only a small number of original cast members still appearing in the 1980s. In 1983, the Daily Mirror published a story revealing that Speed was 15 years older than she publicly claimed she was (though her birth certificate, which showed she was born in 1899 and not 1914 as she had always claimed, was not printed alongside the story). "It broke her spirit completely," a friend said, adding "she would never go back on the Street after that." Whilst filming, Speed collapsed, and was taken to hospital, suffering from stomach pains. At home, she said that she had every intention of returning to Coronation Street after she had recovered. However, her ill health meant she stayed at home; her hearing also declined, and she became reclusive. Speed's last broadcast appearance on Coronation Street was during the episode shown on 12 October 1983.

In 1985, her house was burgled while she was asleep. Following this, Speed went into hospital, and would never return to her home in Chorlton-cum-Hardy. She made her last appearance as Annie Walker during the 1988 ITV Telethon, looking "frail but happy" behind the bar. Aged 91, Speed appeared on a 1990 television programme to mark thirty years of Coronation Street. Helped on stage by the host, Cilla Black, Speed was given a standing ovation from the Coronation Street cast present.

Speed's final television appearance was an interview given with actor Ken Farrington, who played her on-screen son Billy, in 1993.

In the fictional drama The Road to Coronation Street about the creation of the soap, broadcast by the BBC in 2010 as a tribute to the fiftieth anniversary of the first episode of Coronation Street, Speed was portrayed by Celia Imrie.

== Honours ==
Speed was awarded the MBE in 1977. Two years later, Speed received a Pye Television Award for Outstanding Contribution to Television. She was also an honorary member of the Licensed Victuallers' Association.

She was recognized with a Heritage plaque by The Heritage Foundation placed outside Manchester's Granada Studios in 2000. She was later recognized with a Bronze plaque by Manchester City Council in 2011.

== Personal life ==
Speed never married. She lived in Southport for many years, until returning to Manchester to care for her mother after she became ill. Speed's mother Ada died in 1973, aged 95. Her father George had died in 1945, aged 76.

The actress said that Annie Walker "stood for everything I'm not"; Speed disliked pubs, and lacked patience with her character's posturing. Her Coronation Street colleagues described her as "intellectual", "very politically minded" and "a keen socialist". In 1966, Speed, along with Pat Phoenix (Elsie Tanner) and Arthur Leslie (who played Speed's on-screen husband Jack Walker), were guests of Prime Minister Harold Wilson, his wife Mary and Chancellor of the Exchequer James Callaghan at 10 Downing Street. "This was to give our friends a send-off on their Australian tour, to wish them all the luck," Wilson commented.

Recalled by her friend and co-star Betty Driver (who played Betty Turpin), Speed was described as "a gentle lady, a quiet soul who lived with her mother. She didn't suffer fools but was generous and kind-hearted." Driver, who was also friends with Margot Bryant (Minnie Caldwell), noted that the pair "were at each other's throats all the time. Doris was staunch Labour and Margot was Tory."

Upon her death, Coronation Street writer Leslie Duxbury wrote, "Annie Walker was not a lady to be trifled with and neither was Doris Speed," adding that the actress "looked at the world through a wry eye and expressed what she saw with a sharp wit." Duxbury wrote of her "Dorisisms", described as "often off-the-cuff cameos of her fellow thespians", which "were a common delight in Granadaland."

When she was not recording or rehearsing, Speed played bridge with other Coronation Street cast members, and did the crossword in The Guardian. "She played bridge like a professional, and went through crosswords like a knife through butter," Jean Alexander (Hilda Ogden) recalled. Speed's hobbies at home were reading theatrical biographies and watching Coronation Street. "I study Annie to make sure that no silly mannerisms creep in," the actress commented. "It's her I'm watching, not myself." Speed was said to have never forgotten the hardships of her childhood, and after a "lifetime of thrift", the success of Coronation Street enabled her to take holidays abroad. She also enjoyed travelling to the theatre in Stratford-upon-Avon, as well as the Chichester and Pitlochry festivals.

== Death ==
After leaving Coronation Street, Speed moved into the Highbank nursing home in Walshaw, Bury, where she lived until her death. She died during an afternoon nap on 16 November 1994, and was found by a member of staff who had gone to collect her afternoon tea tray. Speed was said to have fallen asleep reading the novel To Sir, With Love by E. R. Braithwaite, while a cigarette was still burning at her side. The owner of the nursing home said, "What was remarkable was that she got up and put on her best dress and make-up. It is something she never did, unless she was expecting a guest. Nobody was due to see her yesterday and I wonder if she knew what was going to happen." Speed was 95, the same age at which her mother had died.

Tributes were paid by her former colleagues. Granada Television said in a statement: "Because of Doris Speed's wonderful performance, the character of Annie Walker became one of the legends of Coronation Street and British TV. She maintained a close link with the programme and Granada." Speed had been due to attend a tribute to Coronation Street on 28 November at Manchester Town Hall. Show creator Tony Warren said, "She was a superb actress and the most loyal of friends." Her funeral took place on 23 November 1994 at the New Jerusalem Church in Kearsley, Bolton, and was attended by fellow Coronation Street stars, including Jean Alexander, Betty Driver, Julie Goodyear (Bet Lynch), Daphne Oxenford (Esther Hayes) and Irene Sutcliffe (Maggie Clegg). Bryan Mosley, who had played Alf Roberts in the show, gave a Bible reading, and Kenneth Farrington, who played her on-screen son Billy Walker, told the service: "She was admired by the whole world." Speed was cremated in Blackley, Manchester. ITV's tribute programme in the month of her death attracted an audience of 10.11m viewers, which was a higher figure than that week's episode of Blind Date, a flagship Saturday night game show on the same network. Speed left an estate worth £514,192 (equivalent to over £1m in 2022).

== Legacy ==
Speed is commemorated by two plaques in her native Manchester: including a blue plaque outside Granada Studios, where she filmed most of her work as Annie Walker, and another at 13 Sibson Road, Chorlton-cum-Hardy, her home for many years.
