= Variety on View =

British TV variety series (1946–1947)

- Country of origin: United Kingdom
- No. of episodes: 6

Original release
- Release: 1946 – 1947

Variety on View is a British television programme which aired for a total of six episodes from 1946 to 1947 on the BBC. It was a live variety telecast from the Bedford Theatre, with music hall acts of various kinds. The series is missing, believed lost.
