= Violet Carson =

British actress and singer (1898–1983)

Violet Carson OBE
- Publicity photo of Violet Carson
- Born: Violet Helen Carson; 1 September 1898; Ancoats, Manchester, England
- Died: 26 December 1983 (aged 85); Blackpool, Lancashire, England
- Occupations: Actress, singer, pianist
- Years active: c.1913–1980
- Spouse: George Peploe (m. 1926; died 1929)
- Relatives: Nellie Kelly (sister)

Violet Helen Carson (1 September 1898 – 26 December 1983) was a British actress of radio, stage and television, and a singer and pianist, who had a long and celebrated career as an actress and performer during the early days of BBC Radio, and during the last two decades of her life as the matronly Christian widow, town gossip and elderly battle-axe Ena Sharples in the ITV television soap opera Coronation Street. She was one of the original characters from the series debut in 1960 and would feature in the role for twenty years.

== Early life and career ==
Carson was born on German Street (later re-named Radium Street) in Ancoats, Lancashire. Her Scottish father, William Brown Carson, ran a flour mill and her mother, Mary Clarke Carson (née Tordoff), was an amateur singer. As a child, she took piano lessons while attending a Church of England school and performed with her younger sister Nellie as a singing act called the Carson Sisters. In 1913, she became a cinema pianist providing the musical accompaniment for silent films. As silent films fell out of fashion following the arrival of "talkies", Carson took up singing.

She married road contractor George Peploe on 1 September 1926, her 28th birthday. Peploe died in 1929 at the age of 31. They had no children and Carson never remarried.

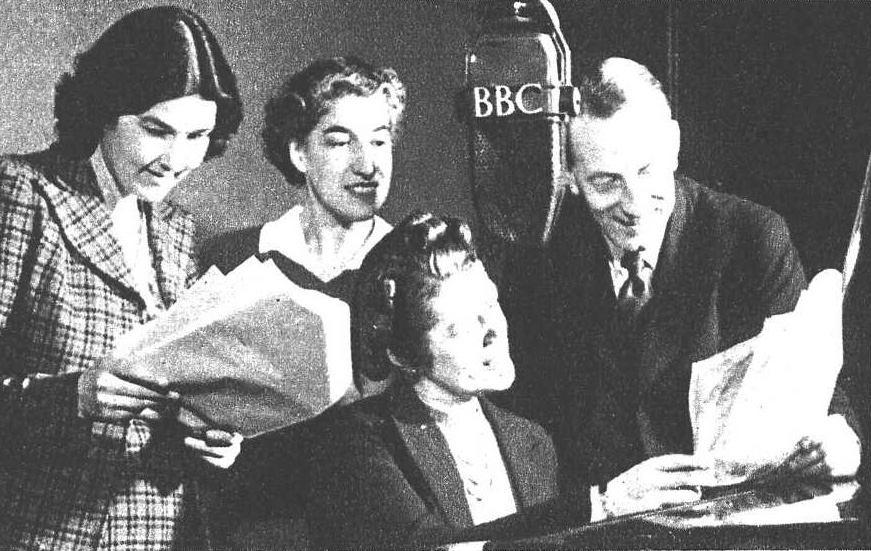
Violet Carson performing in a radio broadcast in 1946 (third from right) with Nan McDonald, Muriel Levy and Wilfred Pickles

== Radio and theatre career ==
In 1935, Carson joined BBC Radio in Manchester, singing a range of material from comic musical hall style songs to light operatic arias. She began in a show called Songs at the Piano and was a regular member of Children's Hour on the BBC Home Service. Carson was also the star of Nursery Sing Song from Manchester, in which she frequently sang with producer Trevor Hill, many years her junior. Contrary to popular opinion, she was never known as "Auntie Vi", that epithet belonging only to Violet Fraser in the 1920s. "I was never anyone's aunt", Carson exclaimed when Hill produced a BBC Radio programme about her in 1981.

In 1938, Carson provided piano accompaniment for two songs in an Al Bowlly recording session, which were released on a His Master's Voice 78 with Carson being credited. She worked with the Council for the Encouragement of Music and the Arts during the Second World War, and was for six years the pianist for the Wilfred Pickles radio show Have A Go.

Her extensive radio career included a period as a presenter and interviewer on Woman's Hour for five years, and she acted in numerous radio dramas. It was while recording a children's programme in 1951 that she first worked with Tony Warren, who would later become the creator of Coronation Street.

== Coronation Street ==
Carson is best remembered for her role as Ena Sharples, the flint-faced and gruff moral voice of Coronation Street, a role she played from 1960 to 1980. In 1962, she was named ITV Personality of the Year for her portrayal of Ena.

For much of her time on the programme, Ena's moralising caused her to spar regularly with Elsie Tanner (Patricia Phoenix). She appeared in the first episode, which aired on 9 December 1960. Long after her departure from the programme and after her own death, Carson continues to be synonymous with the hairnet that Ena chose to wear for almost every occasion. As a singer, Carson was in the soprano range and was a regular on the Christian hymnal programme Stars on Sunday during its ten-year run from 1969.

On 14 February 1968, Carson sailed from Southampton on the Orient Line's liner Oriana, bound for Australia. She arrived in Fremantle on 6 March 1968 and Melbourne on 9 March. Thousands of Australians greeted her on the docks. On 22 March 1968, she attended the 10th Annual TV Week Logie Awards (named after John Logie Baird) at the Southern Cross Hotel in Melbourne, where she presented awards to some of the winners that year.

During the 1970s, Carson suffered from ill health, and only played Ena sporadically from 1972 onwards. She was absent from Coronation Street for most of 1974 after suffering a stroke.

In April 1980, Carson made what would ultimately be her final appearance on Coronation Street. A storyline involving Ena moving to Lytham St. Annes to stay with a friend while her flat at the street's community centre was being renovated, was aired. When the character returned, the flat was not ready and Ena announced on screen (to characters Ken Barlow and Albert Tatlock) that she would return to her flat — but only if she felt like doing so. It was at this point that Carson became ill with pernicious anaemia and was forced to leave the programme, although at the time it was anticipated that she would return at some stage. However, this did not happen and all subsequent storylines involving Ena were shelved due to Carson's poor health, although Ena was not written out.

Carson lived in a bungalow in Bispham, Blackpool, with her sister Nellie, and refused to make any public appearances after her retirement. The year after she retired, Carson underwent surgery for an abscess from which she never fully recovered.

== Recordings ==
Violet Carson released an EP Violet Carson Sings and Plays for You on the Columbia label in 1961. She later recorded an album Stars on Sunday: Miss Violet Carson for the York label.

== Death ==
Carson died of heart failure on Boxing Day 1983 at the age of 85. She was cremated in a private ceremony at Carleton Crematorium, Blackpool, on 4 January 1984, and is commemorated at Bispham Parish Church in Blackpool.

A memorial service dedicated to Carson was held at Manchester Cathedral on 28 February 1984, the same Cathedral where she was baptised and married. The service was attended by 500 people, as well as many of her Coronation Street colleagues including William Roache (Ken Barlow) and Granada Television president Lord Bernstein. Sir Charles Groves conducted the BBC Philharmonic Orchestra, including an arrangement of Carson's favourite song, "Cherry Ripe".

Carson left £193,190 in her will, with bequests including to the Grand Theatre Trust in Blackpool, the Sharp Street Ragged School in Manchester, for whom she was the former president, and Friends of Manchester Cathedral. The residue of her estate went to her sister, Nellie Kelly.

== Honours ==
Carson was made an Officer of the Order of the British Empire in 1965 and had a rose cultivar named after her ('Violet Carson', McGredy 1964). Wax statues of her are held at Madame Tussauds in London and Blackpool. She switched on the Blackpool Illuminations in 1961.

Carson is commemorated by a blue plaque outside Granada Studios in Manchester, where she filmed the majority of her work as Ena Sharples.

Year	Award	Category	Work	Result	Ref
1961	Daily Mirror TV Awards	Woman's Character Of The Year	Coronation Street (Ena Sharples)	Won	
1962	Variety Club of Great Britain Awards	ITV Personality of the Year	Coronation Street (Ena Sharples)	Won	

== Selected filmography ==
Title	Year	Role
Variety on View (TV series)	1947	Music Illustrator
A Job for the Boy (TV movie)	1957	Maggie Lomax
When We Are Married (TV movie)	1957	Maria Helliwell
One Man Absent (TV movie)	1958	Mrs. Trubble
Television Playwright (TV series)	1958	Sarah Oldroyd
Champion Road (TV series)	1958	Mrs. Briggs
Make Yourself at Home (TV miniseries)	1958	Various roles
Hilda Lessways (TV series)	1959	Aunty Hamps
Saturday Playhouse (TV series)	1959	Emily Baxter
BBC Sunday-Night Play (TV series)	1960	Fanny Brighouse
An Age of Kings (TV mini-series)	1960	Duchess of York
A Royal Gala (TV series)	1963	Guest
All Star Comedy Carnival (TV movie)	1969-1970	Ena Sharples
Spectrum (TV series documentary)	1972	Guest
Stars on Sunday (TV series)	1970-1972	Guest
This Is Your Life (TV series documentary)	1971-1980	Various Appearances honouring Wilfred Pickles (1971); Pat Phoenix (1972); Jack Howarth (1974); Julie Goodyear (Self voice)
Coronation Street (TV series)	1960-1980	Ena Sharples
