= Ena Sharples =

Fictional character from Coronation Street

- Coronation Street character
- Portrayed by: Violet Carson
- Duration: 1960–1980
- First appearance: Episode 1; 9 December 1960
- Last appearance: Episode 1983; 2 April 1980
- Created by: Tony Warren
- Introduced by: Stuart Latham (1960); Susi Hush (1975); Bill Podmore (1978)
- Book appearances: Coronation Street: The Complete Saga; Coronation Street: Keeping The Home Fires Burning; Coronation Street: The War Years
In-universe information
- Occupation: Mission caretaker (retired)
- Father: Thomas Schofield
- Mother: Mary Schofield
- Brothers: Tom Schofield
- Sisters: Alice Raybould
- Husband: Alfred Sharples (backstory)
- Sons: Ian Sharples
- Daughters: Vera Lomax; Madge Sharples
- Grandsons: Colin Lomax
- Grandfathers: William Schofield
- Uncles: Tom
- Nephews: Tom Schofield; Clifford Schofield; Alan Raybould; Willie Raybould
- First cousins: Lettie
- Other relatives: Jason Lomax; Tom Schofield

Ena Sharples is a fictional character from the British ITV soap opera Coronation Street, played by Violet Carson. She appeared in the first episode, broadcast on 9 December 1960, and stayed with the show until 2 April 1980.

== Development ==
Ena Sharples was the matronly widowed caretaker of the Glad Tidings Mission Hall. A retired pensioner, she spent much of her time criticising the activities and loose morals of the street's other residents. One of the main characters during the 1960s, she was featured less regularly in the 1970s due to the declining health of actress Violet Carson and was written out in 1980. Almost always wearing a double-breasted overcoat and hairnet, she spent much of her free time in the serial's early years with her two cronies, Martha Longhurst (Lynne Carol) and Minnie Caldwell (Margot Bryant), in the snug bar of local pub The Rovers Return Inn, drinking milk stout. Ena particularly criticised Elsie Tanner (Pat Phoenix), who she believed had loose morals. In turn, Elsie strongly disliked Ena for her seemingly incessant gossip and desire to know about the private lives of others, and the two confronted each other frequently.

The final episode featuring Ena was broadcast on 2 April 1980. It attracted little media or public attention, as the producers intended for her to continue in the serial and the character was merely going to stay with a friend, Henry Foster, in St Annes while her flat in Coronation Street was being renovated. However, all subsequent storylines involving Ena had to be scrapped owing to Carson developing symptoms of pernicious anemia and becoming too ill to appear.

Carson died on Boxing Day 1983 at the age of 85. No further mention of Ena was made, and it was assumed she had moved to St Annes permanently. The first reference to her after this was in the 1985 spin-off video The Jubilee Years when Ken Barlow revealed that Ena died "a couple of years ago", placing her death around the same time as that of Carson's. The first mention of Ena's alleged death in the show itself was on 27 November 1989, during a scene in the Rovers Return when Deirdre says to builder Maurice Jones: "Ena Sharples would be turning in her grave."

In 2010, a short online video titled Ken: A Life on the Street stated that she was no longer alive when Ken Barlow (William Roache) told his grandson Simon (Alex Bain) that she was "long dead now". This is available as an extra on the Tram Crash DVD, released in 2011. It's unknown whether this extra is considered officially canon within the show's main continuity.

== Storylines ==
=== Backstory ===
Ena Schofield was born in Weatherfield on 24 November 1899. She had two elder siblings, Alice Raynold (née Schofield) (1885–1965) and Tom Schofield (d. 1973). During her school days Ena met Martha Hartley (Lynne Carol) and Minnie Carlton (Margot Bryant), establishing lifelong friendships. An attentive student with a strong Christian upbringing, Ena became devoted to her religion and developed a firm belief in the importance of rules, regulations and morals. She also quickly learned to be self-sufficient, taking on factory work when she was only eleven.

In 1915, Ena became engaged to Phil Moss, nephew of Gladys Arkwright, her mentor at the Glad Tidings Mission Hall. However, he enlisted for military service in the Great War and was killed in battle, devastating Ena. In 1914, Ena had become friends with Albert Tatlock after Dinky Low, a local boy Ena had a crush on, asked her to write to Albert. Ena and Albert became close enough that he would stay with her family while on leave but, when he asked her if she wanted to be more than friends, she declined, stating that she was still mourning Phil. Around 1917, Ena met Alfred Sharples, who had been sent home because of a leg injury. There was an instant chemistry, but Ena was upset to learn he was already married, and broke contact with him. When the war ended Alfred and Ena met up again and he told her that his marriage had been in name only – he'd had to marry the daughter of someone his father had owed money to. Alfred also informed Ena that his wife had recently died, so Ena decided to give him another chance. Ena married Alfred in 1920 and they had three children: Vera, Madge and Ian. Ian died after only two days and Alfred died in 1937 during the Depression, leaving Ena a widow with two children. As Vera and Madge grew up Ena alienated them through her judgemental and frequently interfering nature – a point of much contention for Ena. Madge and her mother became almost completely estranged after Madge emigrated in 1950.

=== 1960–1980 ===
In 1960, Ena was in conflict with the Mission's new lay preacher Leonard Swindley (Arthur Lowe), who objected to her frequenting the Rovers. Ena collapsed due to the stress but walked out of hospital to return to her post so that Martha Longhurst (Lynne Carol), who had taken on her responsibilities while she recovered, could not steal her job. In 1961, Ena was sacked for spreading a rumour that Coronation Street was being demolished, which turned out to be untrue. Swindley was forced to rehire her when a suitable replacement could not be found (Ena had bribed the other candidates to turn the job down). Still unhappy with the working conditions, however, Ena walked out of the job later in the year and moved in with Minnie Caldwell (Margot Bryant), with Albert Tatlock (Jack Howarth) briefly taking on the caretaker position. She was eventually offered her job back.

Ena had a health scare in 1962 when she suffered a minor stroke, brought on by hypostatic pneumonia. She quickly regained her speech and mobility, but the following year was diagnosed with arteriosclerosis. Despite her willingness to gossip Ena was very guarded about her private life, and berated Martha for discussing her health problems with Ena's daughter, Vera Lomax (Ruth Holden).

Later that year Ena's great nephew, Tom Schofield (David Holliday), visited her and invited her to her brother's home in the US for an extended stay. Ena jumped at the chance to go abroad for the first time and meet the family she never knew she had. Upon her return, Ena was horrified to see the Mission converted into a Community Centre, with social worker Ruth Winter (Colette O'Neil) employed there full-time. She quit upon hearing the news and moved in with Minnie at No.5. Despite being out of work, Ena was soon occupied with other problems as Vera came to stay, having separated from her husband Bob Lomax. Vera had debts to pay but not the money to pay them, so Ena gave her the money – even though it was all her savings. A disoriented Ena was later caught accidentally stealing from a supermarket. In court Ena pleaded not guilty, but refused to give her age when questioned, saying only that she was over 21. She was subsequently fined 40 shillings. To offset her money problems Ena took on the job of live-in housekeeper at No.9 for Len Fairclough (Peter Adamson) although, when the Community Centre at the Mission closed down, Ena moved back into the vestry.

Vera came to stay again later in 1966, claiming to be ill. Ena did not believe her until she spoke to Vera's doctor, who said that Vera had a brain tumour and had just a month to live; however, Vera had not yet been told that her condition was terminal. Ena watched her daughter decline over several weeks until she died in Ena's bed in January 1967.

The Mission was closed permanently a year later, when it was demolished along with the factory to make way for a block of two-storey maisonettes. Ena was offered a place at an old people's nursing home, which she unsurprisingly declined, choosing to lodge with her old friend Henry Foster at St. Annes after briefly living with Minnie; nevertheless, when the maisonettes were built Ena moved into No.6, a purpose-built OAP ground floor flat. Ena was pleased, as it occupied the exact spot where the vestry had been.

In 1969, Ena became bored with the maisonette and moved into a flat above Ernest Bishop's (Stephen Hancock) camera shop. With Glad Tidings gone, Ena's closest place of worship was the Victoria Street Mission, and she kept close tabs on the comings and goings there. She was delighted in 1970 to meet young Tony Parsons (David Hill), who shared her passion for the harmonium. Recognising his talent, Ena made him her protégé and gave him lessons, while seeing about getting him a scholarship.

When the maisonettes were demolished in 1971, one of the buildings which replaced them was a community centre. Despite her age, Ena was determined to secure the position of caretaker, and scared off her competitor Hetty Thorpe (Margery Withers) by warning her about the violence in the area. With no-one else to take the job, Ena was selected for the job, and she moved into a flat adjacent to the centre. Ena's age and ability to do the work was a constant concern to the council. A co-caretaker was foisted on her (none other than Albert Tatlock), though she insisted on being called "senior caretaker". In 1973, Ena suffered two heart attacks, but refused to move away as she wanted to die in the street. When she disappeared with the centre's keys at Christmas, preventing the children from getting any presents, Ena assumed she would be sacked and left to stay with Henry Foster in St. Annes. However, she was allowed to keep her job.

Later in the 1970s, Ena alternated between Weatherfield and St. Anne's. Her friends gradually left her life – Martha had died in 1964 and Minnie left in 1976 to live at Whaley Bridge with their old friend Handel Gartside (Harry Markham). In 1977, Councillor Tattersall (George Waring) tried to sack Ena so that his niece could take her job, but Alf Roberts (Bryan Mosley) fought on Ena's behalf. The Lomaxes offered to house Ena in Hartlepool, but she declined. In 1980, Ena dumped herself on Elsie Tanner (Pat Phoenix) and later Albert, while the flat was being redecorated. Angered by the lack of progress that prevented her from moving back into her home, she left to stay in St. Annes, unsure about whether or not to return to Coronation Street.

Ena was never seen in Weatherfield again, and all subsequent references to her were in the past tense. In 1989, Deirdre Barlow (Anne Kirkbride) said that, due to recent events in Coronation Street, "Ena Sharples would be turning in her grave", with the assumption that she had died by this time.

== Reception ==
In a book written about Women and Soap Opera, Ena was described as "brusque and uncompromising, refusing to adjust to the changing times". Ena has also been described as "a Coronation Street prototype, a strong, bossy woman". In an interview, Violet Carson described Ena as "the eternal busybody, the rock of ages; when things are going well, she is the old bag, when things are going wrong, she is the first one they turn to", in another interview she said that "children were not frightened of Mrs. Sharples", Violet Carson said "children will come and hold Mrs. Sharples' hand".

Actor Michael Melia has claimed in an interview that he thought the character of Ena was "the most forbidding face on the street. A harridan in a hairnet with a surly expression that could stop a grown man in his tracks."
