= Pat Phoenix =

English actress (1923–1986)

- Phoenix in the 1960s
- Born: Patricia Frederica Manfield; 26 November 1923; Fallowfield, Manchester, England
- Died: 17 September 1986 (aged 62); Cheadle, Greater Manchester, England
- Other name: Patricia Pilkington
- Occupation: Actress
- Years active: 1948–1986
- Spouses: Peter Marsh (m. 1953; div. 1961) Alan Browning (m. 1972; died 1979) Tony Booth (m. 1986)

Patricia Phoenix (born Patricia Frederica Manfield; 26 November 1923 – 17 September 1986) was an English actress who became one of the first sex symbols of British television through her role as Elsie Tanner, an original cast member of Coronation Street, a role which she portrayed from its first episode in 1960 to 1973, and again from 1976 until she quit the role in 1984. In Elsie Tanner, she is credited with creating one of the most famous characters in British soap history.

== Early life ==
Phoenix was born at St Mary's Hospital in Fallowfield, Lancashire, to Annie (née Noonan), originally of County Galway, Ireland, and Thomas "Tom" Manfield. Phoenix also claimed that she had been born in Galway, although she later stated that she was merely agreeing with something her elderly mother had already told the press.

When Phoenix was eight years old, her father was involved in a car accident; in court, it was revealed that his marriage was bigamous as he had never divorced his first wife, who was living some miles away and who he had been paying maintenance to for many years. She later described this period in her life as a "nightmare", saying that "I lost my safe, secure, normal world". Her mother later married Richard Pilkington.

Phoenix attended Fallowfield Central School. As a child, she nursed early theatrical ambitions, appearing regularly on the radio in Children's Hour at the age of 11, after having submitted a monologue. After leaving school, she worked as a filing clerk for the electricity charging department of Manchester Corporation, performing in amateur dramatics in her spare time. She joined the Arts Theatre in Manchester and other Northern repertory companies.

== Career ==
Phoenix's big break came in 1948, when she played Sandy Powell's wife in the Mancunian Film Studios film Cup-tie Honeymoon, followed by a summer season in Blackpool with Thora Hird in the show Happy Days. Exposure led to more serious work with Joan Littlewood's Theatre Workshop at the Theatre Royal, Stratford East. She also worked as a writer for ventriloquist Terry Hall and comedian Harry Worth. Some undistinguished film work followed in Blood of the Vampire (1958) and Jack the Ripper (1959) and in 1960, she returned to Manchester with her ambition all but spent.

Phoenix's fortunes improved when she was given her best known role as Elsie Tanner, the devil-may-care divorcée who lived at No. 11 in Coronation Street. By this time, she had changed her name from Pilkington to Phoenix, after the mythological bird that rose from the ashes. She featured in the programme from 1960 to 1973 and again from 1976 to 1984. Her character became known for her fiery red hair and was described by Prime Minister James Callaghan as "the sexiest thing on television". During her periods of absence from the series, she failed in her attempts to find suitable alternative roles. She left the series for the final time in January 1984, having filmed her last scenes during November 1983, her 60th birthday. In the story, her character moved to Portugal to meet up with an old flame until 2004 when the character died in a car crash (off screen).

Phoenix's profile gained her a part in the British film The L-Shaped Room (1962) in which she played a prostitute and which also featured her future husband Anthony Booth in a small role. She was the subject of This Is Your Life in 1972 when she was surprised by Eamonn Andrews on the set of Coronation Street.. After her final departure from Coronation Street, she appeared in a one-act television play, Hidden Talents, in 1986. At this time, she was suffering from advanced lung cancer; in the play, she played a woman dying of cancer. That same year, she also starred in short-lived sitcom Constant Hot Water, playing a Bridlington landlady. In 1985, she was interviewed for a magazine by long-time fan, the singer Morrissey, who also featured her on the cover of one of the Smiths' singles, "Shakespeare's Sister".

== Personal life ==
Phoenix's love life was often fodder for tabloid stories. Her first marriage was to actor Peter Marsh, whom she married in Bradford Cathedral in 1953; the couple divorced in 1961. On 23 December 1972, she married her Coronation Street co-star Alan Browning. The marriage lasted just under seven years, as Browning had alcohol-related problems and died from liver failure in September 1979. She began a relationship with actor Anthony Booth, the father-in-law of future Prime Minister Tony Blair, in 1980, marrying him shortly before she died.

Phoenix wrote two volumes of autobiography; All My Burning Bridges (1974) and Love, Curiosity, Freckles and Doubt (1983). She was a practising Catholic and a lifelong supporter of the Labour Party, campaigning for her future stepson-in-law Tony Blair at the 1983 general election for him to be elected as the Member of Parliament for Sedgefield where he was returned. Phoenix also campaigned with Booth for former Minister for Technology Tony Benn at the 1984 Chesterfield by-election, which Benn won. She owned the Navigation Inn, a pub in Buxworth, Derbyshire.

== Illness and death ==
In March 1986, Phoenix, who smoked 60 cigarettes a day, was diagnosed with lung cancer after collapsing at home. She continued to work following her diagnosis, hiding her illness from most people, including her lover Tony Booth. In the summer of 1986, her condition deteriorated, forcing her to undergo more extensive treatment and confirming mild speculation in the press that she had health problems. It later leaked that she had just weeks to live and had been given the last rites.

Phoenix married Booth in the Alexandra Hospital in Cheadle, Stockport, on 9 September 1986, attracting much media attention. Eight days later, she died in her sleep, aged 62. At her request, her funeral service at the Holy Name Church in Manchester featured a large brass band; according to Coronation Street histories written by show historian Daran Little, she wanted the event that marked her death to be as lively as her life. Booth's daughter Cherie was amongst the mourners, alongside her husband, Tony Blair.

== Legacy ==
Since her death, Phoenix has been portrayed by Kym Marsh, Denise Black, Debbie Rush, Sue Johnston, Lynda Rooke and Jodie Prenger (who have all also appeared in Coronation Street as, respectively, Michelle Connor, Denise Osborne, Anna Windass, Gloria Price, Laura Collins/Lucy Woodrow and Glenda Shuttleworth) and Jessie Wallace in various dramas depicting her life, both on stage and television.

As part of the Coronation Street 40th anniversary celebrations in 2000, blue plaques were unveiled outside the Granada Studios, the location for most of her work on Coronation Street, to four of the soap opera's stars, including Phoenix. The other plaques commemorated the lives of Doris Speed, Bryan Mosley and Violet Carson.

In 1985, The Smiths used an image of Phoenix on the sleeve of their UK single release "Shakespeare's Sister", thereby adding her to what would become a significant set of musical releases, made iconic by their design (other Smiths 'cover stars' included Truman Capote, Alain Delon, Terence Stamp, Elvis Presley, Yootha Joyce, Viv Nicholson, Billie Whitelaw and Shelagh Delaney)

== Awards and nominations ==
Year	Ceremony	Category	Work	Result
1973	TV Times Awards	Best TV Personality	Coronation Street	Won
1974	Variety Club of Great Britain	Best Actress on Television	Coronation Street	Won
1985	BAFTA TV Awards	Special Award	Coronation Street	Won
2000	Heritage Foundation	Heritage Plaque	Coronation Street	Won

== Filmography ==
Year	Title	Role	Notes
1948	Cup-Tie Honeymoon	Mrs. Butler	credited as Patricia Pilkington
1958	Blood of the Vampire	Woman	uncredited
1958	ITV Television Playhouse	Actress	Episode: "Strictly for the Sparrows"
1959	Jack the Ripper	Rowdy Woman in the Crowd	uncredited
1959	Blackpool Show Parade	Actress	Episode: "Happy Days"
1959	The Artful Dodger	Actress	Episode: "Taxi!"
1960-1984	Coronation Street	Elsie Tanner	1583 episodes
1962	The L-Shaped Room	Sonia	
1986	Constant Hot Water	Phyllis Nugent	6 episodes
1986	Unnatural Causes	Nellie	Episode: "Hidden Talents"
