= Tony Warren =

English television scriptwriter (1936–2016)

Tony Warren MBE
- Born: Anthony McVay Simpson; 8 July 1936 Eccles, Lancashire, England
- Died: 1 March 2016 (aged 79) Manchester, England
- Occupation: Screenwriter, actor
- Years active: 1957–2016
- Notable works: Coronation Street

Anthony McVay Simpson (8 July 1936 – 1 March 2016), writing under the pen name Tony Warren, was an English television screenwriter and actor, best known for creating the ITV soap opera Coronation Street. He also worked on other television dramas and wrote critically acclaimed novels.

== Early life ==
Warren was born in Eccles and raised at 3 Wilton Avenue, Pendlebury, Lancashire. He attended Clarendon Road Primary School and Eccles Grammar School. He trained at the Elliott-Clarke theatre school in Liverpool. He adopted Warren as a stage name in his early acting career. He became a regular on BBC Radio Children's Hour and acted in many radio plays, performing with many actors who later became household names through Coronation Street, most notably Violet Carson who played Ena Sharples and Doris Speed who played Annie Walker.

In his memoirs, Over the Airwaves, Children's Hour producer Trevor Hill explains that Warren was an excitable young teenager at rehearsals, so much so that on one occasion Violet Carson warned, "If that boy doesn't shut up, I'll smack his bottom!" During a later unexpected transmission break from London while performing at the Leeds studio, Carson played and sang to the children a dialect song called "Bowtons Yard" in which the storyteller speaks about his neighbours. Starting at Number 1 and ending at Number 12, the storyteller describes each person in turn and Warren later said that this was what gave him the inspiration for Coronation Street.

== Career ==
Warren acted on stage and in several early ITV Plays of the Week.

According to BBC producer Olive Shapley, who had worked with Warren on Children's Hour, the idea for Florizel Street (which became Coronation Street) came to him late one night in 1959 while they were returning to Manchester by train. Shapley recalled:

At about Crewe, after a long period of silence, Tony suddenly woke me up saying, "Olive, I've got this wonderful idea for a television series. I can see a little back street in Salford, with a pub at one end and a shop at the other, and all the lives of the people there, just ordinary things and ..." I looked at him blearily and said "Oh. Tony, how boring! Go back to sleep." ... Tony has never let me forget my error of judgement.

In 1960, Harry Elton at Granada commissioned a script from Warren for a show about "a street out there". Warren wrote all 13 episodes of the serial that ITV initially decided to air. When the show became a success, as creator of the show he continued to write scripts until 1968, after which he moved on to other fields. However, he continued to write occasional scripts until the late 1970s. He was also retained by ITV Studios as a consultant to Coronation Street. "Created by Tony Warren" appears in the closing credits of every Coronation Street episode to this day.

Warren made a cameo appearance in the 50th-anniversary live episode of Coronation Street in December 2010. He was played by David Dawson in the BBC drama The Road to Coronation Street in September that year.

In the 1990s he wrote a series of critically acclaimed novels: The Lights of Manchester (1991), Foot of the Rainbow (1993), Behind Closed Doors (1995) and Full Steam Ahead (1998).

He was the subject of a This Is Your Life television programme on 11 October 1995.

== Awards and honours ==
Warren won a number of awards, all in relation to devising Coronation Street. He received a Special Achievement Award in Soap at the 2000 British Soap Awards and the National Television Landmark Award in 2005. At the Royal Television Society awards, he was honoured with a Lifetime Achievement Award. The society described the show as "the most successful television programme in British history".

In 1994, Warren was appointed a Member of the Order of the British Empire. In 2008 he was awarded an honorary degree from Manchester Metropolitan University "in recognition of his contribution to ground-breaking television and creative writing which has helped put Manchester and Salford on the cultural map". In 2016, following his death, the British Soap Awards announced that they would be renaming their Outstanding Achievement Award (Off Screen) as the Tony Warren Award.

== Personal life ==
Warren was openly gay from his early years of Coronation Street, at a time when male homosexual acts were illegal. Warren battled with drug and alcohol addiction before attending rehabilitation.

He lived in Swinton, Salford, for over thirty years.

== Death ==
Warren died on 1 March 2016 after a short illness, aged 79. His death was announced on Coronation Street's Twitter account.
