= List of Coronation Street characters introduced in 1975 =

Coronation Street is a British soap opera first broadcast on 9 December 1960. The following is a list of characters that first appeared in 1975, by order of first appearance.

== Donna Parker ==
Donna Parker
- Coronation Street character
- Portrayed by: Rachel Davies
- Duration: 1975–1976
- First appearance: 14 July 1975
- Last appearance: 18 February 1976
In-universe information
- Occupation: Canteen worker Hairdresser

Donna Parker, played by Rachel Davies, made her first screen appearance on 14 July 1975. Donna was a love interest for Alf Roberts (Bryan Mosley). Of Alf and Donna's relationship, Mosley said "no one in the street, only viewers, knew.".

While Donna is working in the canteen at the post office, she meets Alf Roberts. Donna asks Alf if he can retrieve a letter that she regretted posting, but Alf turned her down as he did not want to break the law. Donna and Alf become good friends and he takes her in when she loses her home. Alf becomes infatuated with Donna, but she is only interested in Alf for what she can get out of him. When Donna tells Alf that she wanted to run her own hair-dressing business, Alf gives her £500. Donna suddenly disappears from Alf's life and he refuses to press charges against her. The following year, Len Fairclough (Peter Adamson) meets Donna at a club and, recognising her as the woman who fleeced Alf, decides to try to get Alf's money back. When Len learns that Donna wants to buy a new premises for another salon, he gets her interested in The Kabin flat. Donna agrees to pay a £500 deposit for the flat, but when she hands the money over, Len brings over Alf to return the money. However, Alf then reveals that Donna had already paid back the £500 and given him a watch as a thank you.

== Monkey Gibbons ==
Monkey Gibbons
- Coronation Street character
- Portrayed by: Arthur Kelly
- Duration: 1975–1977, 1982
- First appearance: 8 September 1975
- Last appearance: 29 September 1982

Monkey Gibbons, played by Arthur Kelly, made his first screen appearance on 8 September 1975. Monkey was a friend and former cellmate of Eddie Yeats (Geoffrey Hughes).

Eddie Yeats and his friend Monkey reunite to case some houses for Monkey to burgle. They store the proceeds of the burglaries at Minnie Caldwell's (Margot Bryant) house. However, the police quickly catch them and they are sent to prison. When they are released from prison the following year, Eddie and Monkey go to the Rovers Return, hoping to find somewhere to stay. Ray Langton (Neville Buswell) tells them that Number 11 is empty and Eddie and Monkey let themselves in and go to sleep. The owners, Elsie (Patricia Phoenix) and Gail (Helen Worth), return home and throw them out. In desperation, Eddie and Monkey let themselves back in and fell asleep in the living room. The following morning, Elsie and Gail threaten to ring the police, but Eddie begs her not to and she agrees. Eddie and Monkey find separate lodgings in the area and when Eddie is thrown out of his, Monkey invites him to stay with him. Monkey gets some cheap watches and sells them to Eddie, who then sells them on. When one of the watches stopped working after a few days, everyone assumed the watches were dodgy. Eddie throws the lot down a drain, but Monkey explains that the watches were not stolen and they try unsuccessfully to retrieve them. A few years later, Monkey helps Eddie to get back some items that have been stolen and return them to their owners.

== Vince Denton ==
Vince Denton
- Coronation Street character
- Portrayed by: Mike Heywood (1975); Constantin de Goguel (1977)
- Duration: 1975, 1977
- First appearance: 8 September 1975
- Last appearance: 30 March 1977
- Introduced by: Leslie Duxbury
In-universe information
- Occupation: Haulage contractor

Vince Denton, played by Mike Heywood, made his first screen appearance on 8 September 1975. When the character returned in 1977, actor Constantin de Goguel was recast in the role. Vince was brought in as a love interest for Janet Barlow (Judith Barker).

After leaving her husband, Ken (William Roache), Janet began dating Vince and they lived together. When Ken picked Janet up in his taxi one night, he let her stay the night with him as Vince was drunk and violent. Ken becomes worried about Janet, but decides not to interfere when Vince arrive to take her back home. A couple of years later, after being thrown out by Vince, Janet takes an overdose and dies. Vince comes to see Ken after the funeral to tell him that the money in Janet's building society account belonged to him. He had asked her to put some money into her account as a tax dodge. Ken does not believe Vince and stalls him by contacting Janet's sister to ask about her finances. Vince assumes Ken wants the money for himself, but Ken finally accepts Denton's story when he sees documents detailing the financial matters. He agrees to give Vince everything, except for Janet's own savings. While Ken does not hide his contempt for Vince, Vince is satisfied with the outcome.

== Fred Gee ==
Fred Gee
- Coronation Street character
- Portrayed by: Fred Feast
- Duration: 1975–1984
- First appearance: 29 September 1975
- Last appearance: 28 November 1984
- Introduced by: Leslie Duxbury
In-universe information
- Occupation: Barman
- Siblings: A brother and a sister
- Wife: Edna Gee (until 1975); Eunice Nuttall (1981–1982)

Frederick "Fred" Gee, played by Fred Feast, made his first screen appearance on 29 September 1975.

Fred arrived on Coronation Street in 1975 after his wife Edna (Mavis Rogerson) died in a warehouse fire. Annie Walker (Doris Speed), landlady of the Rovers Return, was ordered by the brewery to take on a resident cellar man after the pub had been broken into. Annie was instantly impressed by the quietly spoken, dapper Fred with his old world charm and impeccable manners. This, like so much else of Fred, was just a front to cover his true self: idle, ignorant and coarse.

One of Fred's early storylines included a brief fling with Vera Duckworth (Elizabeth Dawn) and brought her back to the Rovers to have afternoon tea with Annie, but nothing came of the relationship.

Fred was unlikeable and devious, and often did things for the sheer devilment, such as tossing bread on top of Eddie Yeats's (Geoffrey Hughes) dustcart to attract pigeons in order to ruin his chances of winning the Best Kept Dust-Cart competition. Despite the fact that he liked to think he was in charge of the pub, Annie dominated him, Bet Lynch (Julie Goodyear) ridiculed him and Betty Turpin (Betty Driver) did nothing to hide her contempt for him; the only person he did carry some clout over, cleaner Hilda Ogden (Jean Alexander), spoke to him with sarcasm and only begrudgingly obeyed him, after being prompted by Bet or Betty.

Billy Walker (Kenneth Farrington) sacked Fred after goading him into punching him. Fred made his last appearance at Stan Ogden's (Bernard Youens) funeral in November 1984. In 1999, Eunice Gee (Meg Johnson) returned for a brief time and announced that Fred had died of a heart attack some months previously.

Feast himself died five months later, from cancer.

Sarah Mulford from the Daily Record called the character a "grumpy, hapless barman".

== Others ==
| Date(s) | Character | Actor | Circumstances |
|---|---|---|---|
| 8–20 January | Lynn Johnson | Ann Kennedy | Lynn turns to Len Fairclough for help after enduring several years of abuse from her husband, Roy. Lynn insists that she meets Len in private and during the day, so Roy does not find out. Len is horrified to see Lynn's bruises and he gives her the number of a women's refuge, but Lynn refuses the idea. Lynn visits Len several times, but he grows tired of her rejecting his advice. He later loses his temper with her and Lynn finally agrees to go to the police. While Len steps out to for a brief moment, someone enters his house and beats Lynn to death. |
| 10 February | Harold Digby | Joe Lynch | Harold is a councillor and former mayor who attends a dinner hosted by Alf Roberts with his wife, Dawn. Harold is attracted to Rita Littlewood, the hostess for the evening. Harold begins sending Rita gifts, including a see-through nightie and a bracelet. Rita calls Harold and tells him she is not interested. She does not hear from him again. |
| 10–24 February | Dawn Digby | Sandra Bryant | Dawn is Harold's glamorous young wife and former sales demonstrator. When Dawn and Harold attend a dinner hosted by Alf Roberts, Dawn gets on well with Rita Littlewood. Harold begins sending Rita presents and Dawn soon turns up to speak with her. Dawn explains while she has a happy marriage, she knows that Harold's weakness is sending women he fancies gifts. Dawn jokes that it is a good job Rita and Harold were not having an affair, as Rita is a terrible liar. |
| 14 May – 13 February 1980 | Ralph Lancaster | Kenneth Watson | Ralph owned The Gatsby Club, where Rita Littlewood would often sing. Ralph made numerous advances towards Rita and was hated by Len Fairclough. |
| 14 May | Clarkie | Bill Moores | Clarkie is a thief who steals a pile of valuable copper piping stored in the Builder's Yard by distracting the guard dog with a bone. |
| 29 September – 1 October | Jack Tilsley | Bert Gaunt | Jack was the husband of Ivy Tilsley, who appeared alongside his wife having a drink at the Rovers Return Inn with Edna and Fred Gee to celebrate Edna's birthday. The character was mentioned before and in 1972, Ivy mentioned she and Jack had gone through a rocky patch. In 1979 another husband of Ivy's - Bert - was introduced, alongside her son Brian. Although its possible Bert is meant to be Jack, producer Bill Podmore joked in his autobiography that he made Ivy a bigamist when introducing Bert. The name change also came into play as Vera Duckworth later would have a husband called Jack. |
| 8–10 December | Eunice Wheeler | Brenda Elder | While Eunice is in The Kabin, she shows an interest in some wind-up toys. Having made her purchases, she takes advantage of Mavis Riley being distracted and steal one of the toys. Mavis realises that Eunice has taken the toy and tells Len Fairclough, who chases after her. Len insists that Eunice returns to The Kabin and makes Mavis call the police. Mavis does not want to pursue the matter any further, but is forced to give a statement. Eunice's husband, Bob, tells Mavis that she has ruined their Christmas. Mavis comes to Eunice and Bob's flat with presents, but Bob refuses to accept them. |
| 8–10 December | Bob Wheeler | Johnny Caeser | |
