= Eddie Yeats =

Fictional character from Coronation Street

- Coronation Street character
- Portrayed by: Geoffrey Hughes
- Duration: 1974–1983, 1987
- First appearance: 23 December 1974
- Last appearance: 2 December 1987
- Introduced by: Susi Hush (1974); Bill Podmore (1976)
In-universe information
- Occupation: Bin man Window cleaner Builder
- Wife: Marion Willis (1983–present)
- Daughters: Dawn Yeats

Eddie Yeats is a fictional character from the British ITV soap opera Coronation Street, played by Geoffrey Hughes. He made his first screen appearance on 23 December 1974 and remained a regular until 1983, when Hughes opted to quit. However, he reprised his role in November 1987 to facilitate the departure of Jean Alexander as Hilda Ogden.

== Casting ==
Hughes joined the cast of Coronation Street as Eddie in 1974. He departed in 1983, but made a brief return in 1987 as part of Hilda Ogden's (Jean Alexander) departure from the show. Hughes was approached several times about a return to Coronation Street, but he declined all offers.

== Storylines ==
Eddie Yeats was born in Liverpool on 22 August 1941. In adulthood, Eddie had low-paid jobs and made extra cash by helping out disreputable friends with carrying out burglaries and selling stolen goods. In 1973, Eddie was caught by the police and sentenced to 18 months' imprisonment. His cellmate at Walton Gaol was Jed Stone (Kenneth Cope). When he was released, Eddie visited Jed's former landlady Minnie Caldwell (Margot Bryant) in Coronation Street, hoping she would give him a room before he had to go back to Walton. His friend, Nobby Harris (Donald Webster), asked for his help to rob a supermarket but Eddie chose to stay clean and pursue barmaid Bet Lynch (Julie Goodyear), but during a date, the police arrived to escort him back to prison. Eddie had told Bet he was on leave from the army, and she went off him. After serving the remainder of his sentence, Eddie returned to the street and ingratiated himself with the neighbours, hoping someone would let him stay with them. He tried to fix a date with Bet again but settled for friendship when he stopped her from taking an aspirin overdose when she found out her son, Martin Downes (Louis Selwyn), that had been adopted, was dead.

Eddie went into partnership with Stan Ogden (Bernard Youens) in his window cleaning business and lodged with Minnie at Number 5 and later with builder Len Fairclough (Peter Adamson) at Number 9, but in September 1975 he hid a suitcase containing the proceeds of a burglary carried out by his friend Monkey Gibbons (Arthur Kelly) in Minnie's house, where it was found by the police. Eddie turned himself in and was charged with dishonest handling of stolen goods and sentenced to another year in prison. Eddie returned to Coronation Street again when he was released from Walton in 1976. No one was happy to see him, but he found lodgings at Number 13 for a few weeks when he got special wallpaper for Hilda Ogden's (Jean Alexander) mural and helped her decorate. Eddie built a playground at the back of the Community Centre for the local children, helping out Ken Barlow (William Roache). He was not trusted by the children's parents because of his criminal history, and forcibly removed from the project, despite Ken defending him.

After his brief stay with the Ogdens, Eddie lived at Monkey Gibbons' house. Stan and Hilda began to regard Eddie as a son. In 1977, he started a short-lived curtain-making business with Hilda, but this ended when Mike Baldwin (Johnny Briggs) would not let Hilda use his factory. Eddie regularly tried to sell products to his neighbours, insisting nothing was stolen or faulty, but there was always a problem of some sort. He sold Rovers Return landlady Annie Walker (Doris Speed) a carpet with her initials on it. The initials were the same because the carpet came from the Alhambra Weatherfield Bingo Hall. His promise to get a colour television for the Ogdens was similarly unsuccessful as he only managed to get them a colour tinted screen. In 1978, Eddie was suspected by the police of stealing Stan's handcart and filling it with lead stolen from Farraday Street, even though Eddie's friend, "Tiny" Hargreaves (Jimmy Gardner), was the real culprit. The cart was impounded by the police when Hilda took it back and Eddie and Stan claimed it was stolen. But the police found Eddie's fingerprints on the cart and Stan discredited Eddie's alibi by claiming not to know him. Eddie forgave Stan when he told the police the truth, but to clear themselves, they had to admit who the real culprit was, and Eddie hated the thought of shopping his friends to the police.

Eddie started working for Len Fairclough in 1979, fixing roofs. In April, he took possession of six hens and made a coop for them in Number 13's garden. He convinced Hilda to keep them by promising they would bring the Ogdens money. However, when the Ogdens were ridiculed for their ownership of the hens, Hilda made Eddie cook them for food. Eddie found himself facing prison again when he entertained his friend Herbie Cook (Joe Black) at Betty Turpin's (Betty Driver) house, where Eddie was insulating Betty's loft. When Herbie stole a clock, Eddie was suspected as he had a key to Betty's house, due to the job he had been given. Herbie would not admit taking the clock, but Eddie convinced Betty not to tell the police. In 1980, now nearly 40 years old, Eddie was keen to settle down and marry, firstly dating Lorna Ferguson (Annie Hulley) then Pat Marshall (Barbara Pierson). Eddie began experiencing difficulties and lost his job at the builder's yard when Len took on apprentice Martin Cheveski (Jonathan Caplan) and sacked Eddie because there was not enough work for all of them. Eddie considered starting his own business, but his neighbours ridiculed the idea, so he took a job as a binman. The Ogdens let him live at Number 13 on hearing he was earning a reasonable wage.

On one shift, Eddie discovered a half-full can of hair dye in the Rovers' bins, belonging to landlady Annie Walker and returned it to her, believing she had discarded it by accident. Annie was angry and embarrassed and forbade Eddie from touching her bins again, going as far as to ask the council for new bin men. Eddie told Annie that his men were boycotting the Rovers, making him unpopular as the smell permeated the pub. The situation was not resolved until Annie apologised.

In 1982, Eddie met Marion Willis (Veronica Doran) after talking to her on CB radio, calling himself "Slim Jim". To impress Marion, who referred to herself as "Stardust Lil", Eddie told her that he was a businessman and was not expecting to meet her, so when the situation arose, he borrowed the key to Mike Baldwin's flat from Hilda, then Mike's housekeeper, and told Marion the flat was his. Hilda found out first but Eddie, was unsure how to tell Marion the truth, had copied the keys and started meeting Marion there regularly. Mike found out when he found post and phone messages for Eddie, but he let Eddie meet Marion there one last time to tell her the truth. To Eddie's relief, the truth made Marion even more attracted to him, as she had been having doubts that they were right for each other due to his supposed wealth. When he realised he was in love with her, Eddie told Marion about his time in prison and when she accepted it, he proposed to her. They got engaged but Marion did not want to marry immediately. After a few months, Marion's ex-boyfriend, Phil Moss (Ken Kitson), turned up to try to win her back. Thinking he might not be good enough and feeling jealous, Eddie ended their engagement and Marion left but returned to tell Eddie that she wanted him. After reconciling with Marion, Eddie intended to raise money to buy a house and invested £1,000 in Geoff Siddall's (Edward Judd) car business. When Eddie realised that he had been conned, Marion left him and told him to stay away. Eddie did not take this well and disappeared but was eventually found in Liverpool. When Marion followed Eddie there, they reconciled again and their engagement was back on.

In 1983, Marion discovered that she was pregnant, and they brought the wedding forward. Eddie took an instant dislike to Marion's mother, Winifred Willis (Joan Scott), as she constantly complained about Eddie and wanted Marion to live in Bury with her. At his stag night, Eddie got a black eye when he tried to stop Fred Gee (Fred Feast) from announcing Marion's pregnancy to the entire pub. Eddie's colleague, Curly Watts (Kevin Kennedy), was a replacement best man (when Eddie's old friend from Liverpool was late getting there), and Hilda stood in for his mother as he married Marion at All Saints' Church. After the wedding, Winifred decided that she did like Eddie after all. The Yeats' returned from their honeymoon to the news that Winifred had had a stroke and was seriously ill. Eddie was thinking about buying a new house, but Marion persuaded him to move to Bury so that she could give her mother full-time care. Eddie got a transfer on the bins and the couple left Weatherfield to start a new life in Bury, with Eddie telling the Ogdens that they had been like parents to him. The following year, Eddie and Marion's daughter, Dawn, was born and Eddie phoned Hilda to ask her to tell everybody at the Rovers.

Between November-December 1987, Eddie returned to Weatherfield to visit Hilda after she had been attacked and injured in a burglary. He left again soon after.

== Reception ==
In 2019, a writer from Soap World included Eddie and Marion's ceremony in their feature profiling soap weddings. They wrote "the Corrie couple endured a rocky road but have maritally blessed. Nice one!"
