= List of Coronation Street characters introduced in 1982 =

Coronation Street is a British soap opera created by writer Tony Warren. It was first broadcast on ITV on 9 December 1960. The following is a list of characters that first appeared in 1982, by order of first appearance.

== Caroline Clegg ==
Caroline Clegg
- Coronation Street character
- Portrayed by: Elaine Donnelly (1982); Sarah Thurstan (1995, 2002)
- Duration: 1982, 1995, 2002
- First appearance: 11 January 1982
- Last appearance: 10 June 2002
- Introduced by: Bill Podmore (1982); Jane MacNaught (2002)
In-universe information
- Husband: Gordon Clegg (1982–)
- Sons: Peter Clegg

Caroline Clegg (née Wilson) is the wife of Gordon Clegg. Caroline and Gordon had met in 1982, and got engaged. Gordon introduced Caroline to his mother Betty Turpin. Betty took a shine to Caroline, although felt Gordon was rushing into things. Nevertherless, they were later married, although it was a quick registry office affair and Betty was not told about it until after it happened. In 1985, their son Peter was born. In 1995, Caroline attended Betty's wedding to Billy Williams alongside Gordon and Peter. Seven years later in 2002, they attended the retirement party for Betty at the Rovers Return where she had been an employee since 1969. Caroline was not pleased when Gordon offered for Betty to come and stay with them in London. Betty moved in with them but soon felt isolated and unwanted. She left to return to her home in Weatherfield. When Betty died in 2012, Caroline did not attend the funeral with Gordon for unknown reasons.

== Chalkie Whitely ==
Chalkie Whitely
- Coronation Street character
- Portrayed by: Teddy Turner
- Duration: 1982–1983
- First appearance: 15 February 1982
- Last appearance: 3 August 1983
In-universe information
- Wife: Mary Whitely
- Sons: Bob Whitely
- Grandsons: Craig Whitely

Thomas "Chalkie" Whitely is a fictional character from the ITV soap opera Coronation Street, portrayed by actor Teddy Turner.

By 1982, Chalkie was a widower and living in Viaduct Street with his grandson Craig, who was living with him while his son Bob, a merchant seaman whose wife had also died, was at sea. Chalkie worked as binman alongside Eddie Yeats and Curly Watts, as a driver. When Chalkie learned that his home was to be demolished, he started house-hunting and became interested in 7 Coronation Street, recently rebuilt by Len Fairclough seventeen years after it collapsed in 1965. Len and his wife Rita lived next door at No.9 and were asking for £14,000 for the adjacent property, which Chalkie thought was too much. Rita also had her eye on the new house and tried to interest Chalkie in No.9, with the Faircloughs moving next door. Chalkie offered £10,000 - less than Len wanted but eventually Len was talked round, and in August Chalkie moved into the house with Craig. More disputes with the Faircloughs were to come; just before the Whitelys were to move in, Rita sold the house's carpets to Chalkie, only for them to be ruined when Len threw an impromptu farewell party at the house. When Chalkie forgot to pass on a letter to Len for a week, Len lost his temper and shouted at Chalkie, resulting in Chalkie refusing to pass on any of Len's post, costing his plumbing business work. Rita later settled it by paying to have Len's post redirected: a victory for Chalkie.

Looking after Craig was an arrangement which worked for Chalkie but it was not without difficulties. Craig was starting to become rebellious by skiving off school and playing his drums, annoying Chalkie and the neighbours, but worst of all was Craig's maternal grandmother Phyllis Pearce, who tracked the pair down even though Chalkie had not passed on their new address to her. Phyllis thought Chalkie was not meeting Craig's needs and started hanging around the house to keep an eye on them both (as Chalkie had feared). When Chalkie and Craig built a pigeon coop together, Phyllis released the pigeons as she thought they were dirty. Chalkie got the pigeons back and looked after them. In November, Bob returned from the Navy to a welcome home party thrown by Chalkie. To Chalkie's surprise, Bob wanted to leave the Navy and settle in Australia to raise Craig. Chalkie was also invited but although the prospect of being out of Phyllis's reach appealed to him, Chalkie had made a life in Weatherfield and felt too old to start again. Phyllis appealed to Chalkie to talk Bob into letting Craig stay but Chalkie decided against it, feeling that Craig would be better off in Australia with his father.

In January 1983, now living alone, Chalkie fell ill with flu and, against his will, was looked after by Phyllis. He kept in touch with the Whitelys in Australia as much as possible and in February decided to sell No.9 and live somewhere smaller so that he could give the money to Bob. Phyllis saw this as an opportunity to get her man and asked Chalkie to move in with her but unsurprisingly the idea did not appeal to him. At the time, Chalkie was pursuing widow Alice Kirby and agreed to live with her, despite being somewhat frightened of Alice. He was ready to sell No.9 to Mr and Mrs Cheetham but Phyllis put them off buying the house, aware that losing that would mean losing any chance of Craig returning. Just as he was to move, Chalkie found out that Alice had dumped him for a retired all-in wrestler. In July, Chalkie put £10 on a five-horse accumulator and came up trumps with £3,554.75 winnings. He immediately started making plans to move to Australia by quitting his job and, leaving No.9 to be auctioned, left for Australia in August. Phyllis made a plea for Chalkie to take her with him but they were dutifully ignored.

== Marion Yeats ==
Marion Yeats
- Coronation Street character
- Portrayed by: Veronica Doran
- Duration: 1982–1983
- First appearance: 15 February 1982
- Last appearance: 7 December 1983
In-universe information
- Occupation: Shop assistant
- Mother: Winifred Willis
- Husband: Eddie Yeats (1983-present)
- Daughters: Dawn Yeats

Marion Yeats (also Willis) was a shop assistant at Maggie Dunlop's florist, who was living in lodgings in Weatherfield. When she arrived, she was at the end of her relationship with her landlady's son, Phil Moss who was in the army. As a result they did not see much of each other, therefore the relationship ended. Subsequently, Marion began chatting to Eddie Yeats (Geoffrey Hughes) and once she realised that she could have a future with him, she moved out of her lodgings and into no. 11 with Elsie Tanner (Pat Phoenix), who lived next door to Eddie at No. 13 with Stan (Bernard Youens) and Hilda Ogden (Jean Alexander).

After many troubles, Marion and Eddie managed to get married and went on honeymoon to Benidorm. In October 1983, Marion's mother Winifred, who lived in Bury, was taken ill. As a result, Eddie and Marion both moved to Bury to be closer to Winifred. In 1984, their daughter Dawn was born. Eddie returned in 1987 for Hilda's leaving party and revealed that he and Marion were still happily married.

== Sharon Gaskell ==
Sharon Gaskell
- Coronation Street character
- Portrayed by: Tracie Bennett
- Duration: 1982–1984, 1999, 2021
- First appearance: Episode 2176; 1 March 1982
- Last appearance: Episode 10361; 25 June 2021
- Introduced by: Bill Podmore (1982); David Hanson (1999); Iain MacLeod (2021)
In-universe information
- Occupation: Sales Assistant; Kennel Maid; Drug Lord
- Father: Geoffrey Gaskell
- Mother: Karen Gaskell
- Adoptive father: Len Fairclough (foster)
- Adoptive mother: Rita Tanner (foster)
- Brothers: Wayne Gaskell; Gary Gaskell; Darren Gaskell
- Half-sisters: Jenny Bradley (foster)
- Husband: Ian Bentley (1999–2021)
- Nephews: Harvey Gaskell

Sharon Gaskell (formerly Bentley), played by Tracie Bennett, first appeared onscreen during the episode airing on 1 March 1982, and remained until her departure on 4 January 1984, later making a brief return in 1999. Sharon is introduced as a sixteen-year-old in foster care and is due to go to long-term foster parents, the Boltons. She is instead fostered by Len (Peter Adamson) and Rita Fairclough (Barbara Knox) in Weatherfield. She enjoys her stay initially, coming to see Len and Rita as parents, but she argues with Len at her 17th birthday party. After Len finds Sharon's boyfriend Steve Dunthorne (Howard Grace) trying to lead her upstairs, he forbids the pair from having sex. She decides to meet the Boltons, her other potential foster family, but decides that she prefers Len and Rita.

Sharon falls for Brian Tilsley (Christopher Quinten) and begins pursuing him, despite the fact he is married. Brian notices her interest, but remains faithful to Gail (Helen Worth) and although he did not encourage Sharon, he does not put her straight either, since he enjoys the attention. She begins babysitting for the couple, and on Brian's birthday, Sharon gives him a keyring, making Brian finally set her straight; however, she ignores him and steals a photograph. Gail sees them fighting over this, and dismisses Sharon's feelings as a teenage crush and asks Rita to have a word with her. Sharon claims that she and Brian are in love, and that Brian had initiated it. Later that year, she begins working as a kennel maid in Sheffield, living with the Stringer family. Len offers her an apprenticeship at the yard so she could stay in Weatherfield but Sharon refuses, feeling she needs a new start.

Sharon returns after hearing about Len's death in a road accident. There, she catches Curly Watts' (Kevin Kennedy) eye. She is embarrassed when Curly reads out a poem about his feelings for her, but agrees to go out with him. On their date, they meet Terry Duckworth (Nigel Pivaro), and Sharon ditches Curly to go to a UB40 concert with Terry. Sharon returns to Sheffield the next day.

Fifteen years later, Sharon returns to Weatherfield to invite Rita to her wedding. She is engaged to Ian Bentley (Jonathan Guy Lewis), a sales representative, and Rita persuades Sharon to get married in Weatherfield. Sharon makes friends with Sally Webster (Sally Dynevor), who like Sharon, has a close relationship with Rita. Ian begins an affair with the recently widowed Natalie Barnes (Denise Welch). Sharon discovers the affair, but intends to marry Ian regardless, dismissing the affair as one last fling. However, during the service, Sharon calls Ian a liar and jilts him. Happy that Sharon has decided to stay, Rita offers her a job at the Kabin and Alec Gilroy's (Roy Barraclough) old flat, No.12. Sharon happily accepts, despite clashing with Rita's assistant, Leanne Battersby (Jane Danson). Rita gives the Kabin to Sharon for her 34th birthday.

Soon afterwards, Sharon begins dating Danny Hargreaves (Richard Standing), but it ends when Danny realises that he is in love with Sally. A depressed Sharon attempts suicide, but cannot go through with it. After her suicide bid, she gets in touch with Ian, and the pair rekindle their relationship, as they realise they still love each other. Rita is furious when Sharon announces her plan to marry Ian and sell the Kabin, so that she could buy a house in Bolton. Rita buys the Kabin back from Sharon and tells her not to expect anything else from her. Sharon marries Ian and leaves Weatherfield.

In March 2021, it was announced that Bennett would be reprising her role as Sharon. On her return, she commented: "I am absolutely thrilled to be returning to the cobbles. It is a dream come true for me. I had such an amazing time there, and I am looking forward to working with Barbara again and getting my teeth into the storylines they have planned for Sharon." She was initially approached by producers 18 months prior to her return, but due to her work schedule and the impact of the COVID–19 pandemic on television, it meant that her return date was pushed back. She finally made her return on the April 21, 2021 episode, reuniting with Rita, and informing her of her past battles with cancer and her breakup with Ian. After scrutiny and suspicion from Jenny Connor (Sally Ann Matthews), she once again leaves after giving Rita a cheque for £10,000. She returns again on the 23 April episode, where she patches things up with Jenny and after breaking down and telling Rita and Jenny of her loneliness, Rita agrees to let her move back in with her. She questions various people about the whereabouts of Leanne Battersby (Jane Danson) and when she goes to visit drug lord Harvey Gaskell (Will Mellor) in prison, it is revealed that she is his aunt. Over the following weeks she tries to find the location of Simon, Leanne and Nick, befriending Nick's son Sam Blakeman (Jude Riordan) and using him to inform Simon that his dad has been sent to hospital for a liver transplant. When Simon arrives at the hospital, his father Peter (Chris Gascoyne) saves him from being abducted and is attacked. Simon leaves his address with Peter, but Sharon finds it on Carla's phone, only to find that the flat is empty. She makes several further attempts to track down Simon, and Harvey insists she resort to intimidating Sam. Harvey arranges Sam's kidnapping. Nick returns to the street, but is warned by Harvey that, if Simon and Leanne give evidence against him, he will harm Sam. Jenny’s husband Johnny recognizes Sharon, having seen her visiting Harvey. When Jenny confronts her, Sharon uses a Taser, and then tries to flee but is interrupted by Rita who locks them both in The Kabin before Gary Windass (Mikey North) breaks in. Seeing Sharon in the white van that Sam was kidnapped in, Gary steals the keys and is pursued by the armed driver, whose attempt to shoot at them is foiled by Sam.

== Wayne Gaskell ==
Wayne Gaskell
- Coronation Street character
- Portrayed by: Philip Pollitt
- Appears in: Episode 2189; 24 March 1982
- Introduced by: Bill Podmore
In-universe information
- Father: Geoffrey Gaskell
- Mother: Karen Gaskell
- Brothers: Gary Gaskell; Darren Gaskell
- Sisters: Sharon Gaskell
- Sons: Harvey Gaskell

Wayne Gaskell is the brother of Sharon Gaskell (Tracie Bennett). He arrives at Sharon's 17th birthday party at her foster parents Len (Peter Adamson) and Rita Fairclough's (Barbara Knox) home unannounced and causes trouble by making unwanted advances towards Trish Keegan (Debbie Bowers) and picks a fight with Steve Dunthorne (Howard Grace) after Steve confronts him about his behaviour toward Trish. Sharon goes to get Len from the Rovers Return, who then throws Wayne out and he is not seen again.

In 2021, it emerges that Wayne has since died and Sharon has inherited his estate. Sharon visits Wayne's son, Harvey Gaskell (Will Mellor), in prison.

== Maggie Redman ==
Maggie Redman
- Coronation Street character
- Portrayed by: Jill Kerman
- Duration: 1982–1984, 1986, 1991–1994
- First appearance: 12 May 1982
- Last appearance: 29 August 1994
- Introduced by: Mervyn Watson (1982); John G. Temple (1986); Carolyn Reynolds (1991)
In-universe information
- Occupation: Florist
- Husband: Harry Redman (1982-1991); Gerry Woodward (1994-present)
- Sons: Mark Redman

Maggie Redman (also Dunlop) was a florist, who owned Maggie's Flowers where Marion Willis worked. She later had a brief relationship with Mike Baldwin (Johnny Briggs), who she met at Marion and Eddie Yeats' (Geoffrey Hughes) engagement party in May 1982. She later fell pregnant with Mike's baby, Mark Redman (Paul Fox), but unlike Mike, who was joyous at the news, Maggie did not want to have a baby and did not want to be tied down to Mike. Maggie then met a man named Harry Dunlop and they married. As a result, he raised Mark as his own. In 1984, Mike saw Maggie with Mark and wanted him to be a part of his life, but Maggie refused.

In 1991, when Mike married Jackie Ingram, she ordered flowers from Maggie's florist, unbeknownst to her that she was marrying Mike. In 1992, Maggie returns again and begins a relationship with Ken Barlow (William Roache) and moved in with him. Ken's daughter, Tracy Barlow (Dawn Acton) discovered that Mark was Mike's son and revealed it to him in January 1993, which annoyed Maggie, who in turn told Tracy about her mother, Deirdre Barlow's (Anne Kirkbride) affair with Mike in 1983. In 1994, Maggie married Gerry Woodward and they moved to Felixstowe.

== Craig Whitely ==
Craig Whitely
- Coronation Street character
- Portrayed by: Mark Price
- First appearance: Episode 2222; 19 July 1982
- Last appearance: Episode 2261; 1 December 1982
- Introduced by: Bill Podmore
In-universe information
- Father: Bob Whitely
- Mother: Margaret Whitely
- Grandfathers: Chalkie Whitely; Harold Pearce
- Grandmothers: Mary Whitely; Phyllis Pearce

Craig Whitely, played by Mark Price. Craig was living with Chalkie while his dad Bob, a merchant seaman, was at sea. In moving to No.9 from their house in Viaduct Street, Chalkie hoped to escape from Phyllis Pearce, Craig's maternal grandmother, who doted on Craig and also had her eye on Chalkie. On moving in, Craig upset the neighbours with his drums, which annoyed even Chalkie. Craig wanted to start a band and skived off school with his friends. Within a few weeks, Phyllis tracked her errant relations down and tried to convince Chalkie to let Craig move in with her, telling him that No.9 was a tip and not fit for a growing lad to live in. When Chalkie and Craig built a pigeon coop together, Phyllis released the pigeons as she thought they were dirty. Chalkie got the pigeons back and looked after them.

In November, Bob returned ashore and announced he was leaving the Navy and emigrating to Australia with Craig. Craig did not think much of the prospect but came round to the idea when Bob invited Chalkie to come along if he could afford it. Chalkie felt too old to make a new start and joined forces with Phyllis to persuade Bob to keep things as they were, but Bob wanted to make up for his absences from Craig's life to date and Chalkie, realising Craig would have better opportunities in Australia, convinced him to go. The following year, Chalkie won on a five-horse accumulator and moved to Australia to settle with the family after all.

== Phyllis Pearce ==
Phyllis Pearce, played by Jill Summers, made her first appearance on 20 September 1982. Summers had previously played the role of Bessie Proctor, a cleaner who worked with Hilda Ogden (Jean Alexander) at a night club. Phyllis is introduced into the series as the grandmother of Craig Whitely (Mark Price). She tracks Craig down to Number 9 Coronation Street, where he is living with his paternal grandfather Chalkie Whitely (Teddy Turner). Phyllis' daughter Margaret had previously died of cancer and Craig moved in with Chalkie following her death. Phyllis is also widowed when she debuts and she decides to reconnect with Craig because he is her only remaining living family. Phyllis later gains employment at Jim's Café. Phyllis is characterised by her trademark blue-rinse hair style. She is also "man-mad", often portrayed trying to find a new partner. Writers created a partnership between Phyllis and Percy Sugden (Bill Waddington), which lasted through most of her duration. Summers regularly received fan mail from young viewers who told her that Phyllis is "funny" and how they wished Phyllis was their own grandmother.

== Joan Lowther ==
Joan Lowther
- Coronation Street character
- Portrayed by: June Broughton
- Duration: 1982–1983, 1985, 1987
- First appearance: 13 October 1982
- Last appearance: 23 November 1987
- Introduced by: Mervyn Watson
In-universe information
- Occupation: Cleaner
- Sisters: Helen Ashcroft
- Husband: Robert Lowther (1946-1987)

Joan Lowther, was the wife of Doctor Robert Lowther who employed Hilda Ogden (Jean Alexander) as a part-time cleaner in their house on Oakfield Drive. She first appeared when she had an interview with Hilda, with the help from two references, Mike Baldwin (Johnny Briggs), who gave a glowing reference, and Annie Walker (Doris Speed), with whom Hilda was not on the best of terms. Hilda was always anxious about making a good impression. In May 1983, she was shocked when the Lowthers appeared at her home, No. 13 Coronation Street while she was out and was met by her husband, Stan Ogden (Bernard Youens) who was in his string vest. The house was also untidy, but the Lowthers were not bothered.

In 1985, after Stan had died, the Lowthers let Hilda house sit for them, however No. 13 was burgled whilst she was away. Hilda took pride in cleaning such a big house and was unhappy when Sally Seddon (Sally Dynevor) offended them whilst taking her place. Hilda and Joan became good friends and invited her and Robert to her and Stan's Ruby Wedding Anniversary in 1986, but Joan did not attend as Audrey Roberts (Sue Nicholls) accidentally dyed her hair orange. In 1987, the Lowthers decided to retire to Hartingdon. Joan initially offered to recommend Hilda as a cleaner for the next occupants, but whilst they were packing, they were burgled and both ladies were attacked. Joan received a bump on the head and subsequently died in Weatherfield General Hospital, whereas Hilda survived. Grieving Robert did not change his plans to retire and asked Hilda to come with him, which she accepted.

== Victor Pendlebury ==
Victor Pendlebury
- Coronation Street character
- Portrayed by: Christopher Coll
- Duration: 1982–1984, 1990–1992
- First appearance: 10 November 1982
- Last appearance: 24 January 1992
- Introduced by: Mervyn Watson
In-universe information
- Occupation: Businessman
- Husband: Yvonne Pendlebury (1990-present)

Victor Pendlebury, worked in the housing department at Weatherfield Town Hall and was later the owner of Pendlebury Paper Products, or for short PPP. Victor was the main man in Mavis Riley's (Thelma Barlow) aside from Derek Wilton (Peter Baldwin) after they met through doing an English Literature course. The two of them spent a lot of time together between 1982 and 1984, such as taking her camping in the Lake District for her birthday. Victor left after he discovered that she had another man, Derek in her life.

In 1990, Victor returned after a six-year absence. He met with Mavis, who had now married Derek on the second attempt, but she did not tell Derek. However, Victor learned that Derek was unemployed, so Victor offered him a job at PPP. Derek swallowed his pride and took the job, but Victor was still in love with Mavis. Earlier that year, he married a Mavis lookalike named Yvonne. Eventually, when Derek decided to try to impress Victor by writing an analysis of the business' shortcomings, potentially saving thousands. Victor was impressed, but not in the way Derek intended - he took its recommendation for making cutbacks and told Derek he had been made redundant as a result of his idea. Mavis went to Victor and asked if he would reinstate him, but Victor told Mavis her charms were wasted on him as he no longer had feelings for her.

== Other characters ==
Character	Episode date(s)	Actor	Circumstances
Raymond Attwood	28 April – 10 May	Joe Searby	A teenager whose spending attracts the suspicions of Deirdre Barlow (Anne Kirkbride) who informs her husband Ken but he refuses to contact the police. The following week, the police arrest Raymond for Betty Turpin's (Betty Driver) mugging.
Ted Farrell	21–23 June	Gerald Sim	Betty Turpin's wartime sweetheart who fathered her son Gordon Clegg. Ted reads about Betty's recent mugging in the local paper and visits her in hospital. It transpires that Ted has settled in Portsmouth, married and fathered a daughter. Betty decides not to tell him the truth about Gordon, not wanting to drag up the past. Ted leaves after he and Betty agree to remember each other as just sweethearts.
Bob Whitely	8 November – 1 December	Freddie Fletcher	The son of Chalkie Whitely and father of Craig, a merchant seaman who, after his wife Margaret died, left his son with his father whilst he was at sea. In November 1982, he decided he had enough of the sea and decided to settle down, in Australia, and he took Craig with him. Chalkie followed the next year, after winning a bet on the horses. During his brief stay with his father, Bob caught the eye of barmaid Bet Lynch, but he only settled for her when he discovered that his preferred option, Deirdre Barlow, was married. However, Bob and Bet's date consisted of them, watching television alongside Bob's family - Chalkie, Craig and Phyllis Pearce.
