= List of Coronation Street characters introduced in 1981 =

1981 saw four new characters making their debuts on Coronation Street: Nick Tilsley, Neil Grimshaw, Eunice Gee and Alma Halliwell.

== Nick Tilsley ==
Nicholas Paul "Nick" Tilsley (also Platt) was born off screen during an episode broadcast on 31 December 1980, but made his first appearance on 5 January 1981. He was played by Warren Jackson from 1981 until 6 September 1996. Adam Rickett took over the role on 15 October 1997 until 21 April 1999 but returned for three separate stints between 2002 and 2004 and made his final appearance as Nick on 11 July 2004. Ben Price took over the role on 21 December 2009. Nick is the first-born child of Brian (Christopher Quinten) and Gail Tilsley (Helen Worth). He is the older brother of Sarah Platt (Tina O'Brien) and David Platt (Jack P. Shepherd) as well as the uncle of Bethany (Lucy Fallon), and Lily Platt and the grandson of Audrey Roberts. Nick's storylines have included his adolescent problems and his role in the fraught relationship between his parents, his teenage marriage to Leanne Battersby (Jane Danson) and their divorce, and his engagement to Maria Connor (Samia Smith). Since his return in 2009 his storylines have featured him remarrying and once again divorcing Leanne, his one-night stand with David's wife Kylie Platt (Paula Lane), suffering brain damage after being involved in car accident which was caused by David, and his business partnership with and later one-day marriage to Carla Connor (Alison King).

== Neil Grimshaw ==
Neil Grimshaw, played by Michael Le Vell, was a paperboy for The Kabin, who appeared on the 5 and 7 January 1981. Two years after playing Grimshaw, Le Vell was reintroduced to Coronation Street as Kevin Webster, who became a regular character in 1984.

== Eunice Gee ==
Eunice Gee
- Coronation Street character
- Portrayed by: Meg Johnson
- Duration: 1981–1982, 1999
- First appearance: 23 March 1981
- Last appearance: 24 May 1999
- Introduced by: Bill Podmore (1981); Jane McNaught (1999)
In-universe information
- Father: Sid Clarke
- Sisters: Dolly Clarke
- Husband: Fred Gee (1981–1982)
- Daughters: Debbie Nuttall

Eunice Gee (née Clarke, previously Nuttall) born 1937 had been a barmaid and was a dry-cleaner when she met Fred Gee at a singles evening. This fitted in with his plans, as he had the chance of the licence of The Crown and Kettle - but the brewery would only consider married couples. They married after a whirlwind romance, but The Crown and Kettle had already been taken and then the next pub fell through when the brewery found out Eunice had previously been sacked from the Foundryman's Arms after £30 disappeared, although she always blamed this on another barmaid.

Annie Walker threw them out of the Rovers Return Inn when they were refused the pub, as the overbearing Eunice acted as though she owned the place and upset both Annie and Betty Turpin. For a while, they ran the Community Centre and moved in there with Eunice's daughter, Debbie, but the marriage started to fall apart. Councillor Ben Critchley, Chairman of the Social Services committee found that the Gees had got the Community Centre through Alf Roberts, without his authority and proceeded to evict them. Conveniently, Ben Critchley was able to offer positions at his Park View Hotel in Weatherfield, and even more conveniently, as he had an eye for Eunice, he knew she would accept but Fred refuse. Fred reluctantly accepted that their marriage would not work; he moved back into the Rovers and the marriage ended. In November 1983 she said she wanted to remarry and divorced Fred.

In 1999 she turned up again, running the Park Road B&B where Jack and Vera Duckworth stayed after leaving the Rovers. In May 1999 her brother-in-law died suddenly in Spain, and Eunice went out there to help her sister Dolly run her bar, leaving the Duckworths running the B&B.

== Don Worthington ==
Don Worthington
- Coronation Street character
- Portrayed by: Brian Capron
- Duration: 1981–1982, 1986
- First appearance: 22 June 1981
- Last appearance: 22 January 1986
- Introduced by: Bill Podmore (1981); John G. Temple (1986)
In-universe information
- Occupation: Social Worker

Donald "Don" Worthington was a social worker who interviewed Len (Peter Adamson) and Rita Fairclough (Barbara Knox) as prospective foster parents. He was played by Brian Capron, who later played villain Richard Hillman in the soap between 2001 and 2003, and he made his first appearance in June 1981. Don's character was seen to be polite and professional in his line of work and took a direct and honest approach with the children. The Faircloughs passed and Don placed John Spencer in their foster care. He returned the following year when he asked Len and Rita to take in Sharon Gaskell (Tracie Bennett). They eventually applied to be Sharon's long-term foster parents, which Worthington was against, but Rita managed to talk them around.

Don returned in 1986 after the police broke the news to Rita's paper deliver, Jenny Bradley (Sally Ann Matthews) that her mother had been killed. Don was called in to get Jenny a placement at Larchfield Children's Home. However, Rita went on to foster Jenny and after her father, Alan Bradley (Mark Eden) was traced down in Leeds, Don asked Rita to mediate between Alan and Jenny.
