= List of Coronation Street characters introduced in 1971 =

Coronation Street is a British soap opera, initially produced by Granada Television. Created by writer Tony Warren, Coronation Street first broadcast on ITV on 9 December 1960. The following is a list of characters introduced in the show's twelfth year, by order of first appearance.

== Ivy Tilsley ==
Ivy Joan Tilsley (also Nelson and Brennan) was played by Lynne Perrie. She was originally credited as Ivy Tyldesley. Ivy worked as a machinist at Mike Baldwin's (Johnny Briggs) factory, and was elevated to supervisor. Her best friend was Vera Duckworth (Liz Dawn). In the 1975 episode where the factory was burnt down, Ivy mentions that she is childless and her husband's name is "Jack"; before that, her husband was called "Wilf Tyldesley", and before that "Arthur". Jack himself made two appearances in 1975. By the time she became a street resident and a more regular character, her husband was named "Bert" and they had an adult son, Brian (Christopher Quinten). Ivy's storylines have included her feud with daughter-in-law Gail Tilsley (Helen Worth), losing her husband and son and her relationship with Don Brennan (Geoffrey Hinsliff).

== Edna Gee ==
Edna Gee
- Coronation Street character
- Portrayed by: Mavis Rogerson
- Duration: 1971–1975
- First appearance: Episode 1086; 16 June 1971
- Last appearance: Episode 1535; 1 October 1975
- Introduced by: H.V. Kershaw
In-universe information
- Occupation: Machinist
- Spouse: Fred Gee (?–1975)

Edna Gee was played by Mavis Rogerson. Edna first appeared in 1971 working at the Mark Brittain mail order warehouse. Edna was the first wife of Fred Gee. Edna was well known in Weatherfield as being a bit of a flirt. In 1973 she attended Hilda Ogden's (Jean Alexander) birthday party and flirted with Ray Langton (Neville Buswell), but ended up in the Ogdens' bedroom with Billy Walker (Ken Farrington). Hilda thought Edna was in the room with Stan. Edna also enjoyed a gossip and along with workmate Ivy Tilsley (Lynne Perrie) started spreading rumours that Elsie Tanner's (Pat Phoenix) husband Alan Howard (Alan Browning) was having an affair. Her other workmates included Elsie, Ken Barlow (William Roache), Emily Nugent (Eileen Derbyshire), Vera Duckworth (Liz Dawn), Gail Potter (Helen Worth) and Tricia Hopkins (Kathy Jones). She attended Emily's wedding to Ernest Bishop (Stephen Hancock) in 1972. In October 1975, Edna celebrated her 40th birthday with Fred in The Rovers Return. The next day Edna was found dead in the warehouse fire, Len Fairclough (Peter Adamson) broke the news to all her friends and workmates.

== Mavis Wilton ==
Mavis Wilton (née Riley) played by Thelma Barlow. A long-running series regular, Mavis appeared in the show for 26 years from 1971 to 1997. Introduced for a one-off cameo appearance, she proved popular with producers and viewers and subsequently became a regular. Mavis was portrayed as moralising, repressed, and dithering, and often appeared in comic scenes with her boss Rita Sullivan or her husband Derek Wilton. She was generally well received by critics, described as a national institution and one of Coronation Street's best loved characters, an old-fashioned spinster. Barlow has been praised for her portrayal of Mavis, a character notably spoofed by impressionist Les Dennis during the 1980s. Barlow decided to leave Coronation Street in 1997; her character left to run a guest house in Cartmel following the death of her husband. Barlow has said that the producers of Coronation Street repeatedly asked her to return as Mavis, but she declined.

== Laura Howard ==
Laura Howard
- Coronation Street character
- Portrayed by: Stella Tanner
- Duration: 1971–1972
- First appearance: Episode 1107; 25 August 1971
- Last appearance: Episode 1205; 2 August 1972
- Introduced by: H.V. Kershaw
In-universe information
- Husband: Alan Howard (until 1969)
- Sons: Mark Howard

Laura Howard was the first wife of Alan Howard. Their son Mark was born in 1952. The marriage was over by 1969 when Alan came to Weatherfield to oversee the salon he had just purchased. Alan briefly met Laura in 1971 when he was staying at a hotel in Leeds. She admitted that there were times when she missed him but he was honest and said he didn't feel the same way. The reason he gave for seeing her was to enquire after Mark who he was estranged from.

By 1972 Laura had opened up her own salon in Harrogate and helped Alan financially in order for him to buy the Canal Garage. In August of the same year, Laura came to Coronation Street to tell Alan and Elsie Tanner that she was getting re-married and wanted to drop Alan's loan – although Elsie refused.

Despite appearing in the programme, before her appearance dialogue in 1970 names Alan's first wife as Dorothea and later on Alan states that his wife was much younger than himself. The age difference once Stella Tanner had been cast eighteen months' later did not seem to be as great as implied.

== Edie Burgess ==
Edie Burgess, played by Elizabeth Kelly, appeared in two episodes in 1971. She is the mother of Freda Burgess (Ali Briggs) and the sister-in-law of Emily Bishop (Eileen Derbyshire). Kelly later gained prominence on another soap opera, EastEnders, as Nellie Ellis.
