= Fred Feast =

British actor (1929–1999)

- Born: Frederick Feast; 5 October 1929; Scarborough, North Riding of Yorkshire, England
- Died: 25 June 1999 (aged 69); Bridlington, East Riding of Yorkshire, England
- Occupation: Television actor
- Spouse: Kathleen Feast
- Children: 3

Frederick Feast (5 October 1929 – 25 June 1999) was a British television actor, best remembered for playing the role of Fred Gee in 552 episodes of Coronation Street between 1976 and 1984.

== Early life ==
He attended the Scarborough High School for Boys and served as a physical training instructor for the Parachute Regiment with the rank of sergeant. This led him to become an adviser on, and appear in, the 1954 British World War II film The Red Beret. He worked as a variety artist and stand-up comic at the Windmill Theatre and appeared in summer seasons and pantomimes. Other occupations included driving instructor, butcher, compere of a performing dolphin show, barman and carpet salesman.

== Early roles ==
Feast acted in numerous television dramas throughout the 1960s and early 1970s, including the BAFTA winning ITV play Another Sunday and Sweet FA, written by Jack Rosenthal, and the first episode of the ITV series The Organization. He also had guest roles television dramas including Nearest and Dearest, Country Matters, South Riding and the mining drama Sam (1973). He appeared in the Ken Loach directed wartime series Days of Hope (1975), written by Jim Allen. Also in 1975, Feast appeared in the Granada Television daytime drama, Crown Court, playing the role of Frank Chadwick, a farmer whose wife stands trial on a charge of malicious wounding.

== Coronation Street ==
Feast was best known for his role as the Rovers Return's potman Fred Gee in the soap opera Coronation Street, a role he played from 1976 to 1984. He had appeared briefly in the soap four years earlier, before being asked back in 1976 by new producer, Bill Podmore. In the story, landlady Annie Walker was advised by the brewery, Newton & Ridley, that she needed a man to do the heavy work. Feast joined Coronation Street in 1976 after his character's wife Edna died in a fire. The character was described in Feast's Times obituary as the "grumpiest barman in Coronation Street, with a temperament to turn the very beer sour".

One of his best known storylines was when Fred took barmaids Bet Lynch and Betty Turpin out for a picnic in Annie Walker's prized Rover 2000 in 1983, only to see the car roll into a lake. Another memorable storyline was when he got a wig and was roundly ridiculed by the Rovers regulars. In 1983, the fictional Fred married Eunice Nuttall in the hope that married status would improve his chances of having his own pub. After Annie Walker left, her son Billy returned and took over the tenancy. Fred ended up thumping Billy and lost his job. He then became a van driver for Mike Baldwin but was sacked and left the Street.

Feast departed abruptly from the serial in 1984, after 552 episodes. Podmore was reportedly furious at Feast's refusal to sign a new contract after allegedly agreeing verbally to do so, or to allow storyline writers extra time to write his character out. The Times reported he left "exhausted through overwork".

Feast was reportedly offended by Coronation Street's shift towards more explicit sexual material. The programme, he thought, was sinking into the "swamp of ordinary soap opera".

Fred Gee last appeared in the soap in November 1984. His departure was abrupt and his position at the Rovers was taken by Jack Duckworth (William Tarmey). When the character's wife Eunice (Meg Johnson) made a brief return to the show in 1999, she mentioned that Fred had died of a heart attack in the interim.

== Later roles ==
After leaving Coronation Street, Feast went on to play knackerman Jeff Mallock in a three-year stint in the BBC1 series All Creatures Great and Small, taking over from Frank Birch.

Feast was dogged by ill health for most of the 1990s, and had a malignant tumour removed from his throat after cancer was diagnosed. He made a short-lived comeback starting in 1996 when Liz Dawn asked him to play the barman in her video Liz Dawn's House Party. An appearance on the regional celebrity Yorkshire TV quiz show Cryer's Crackers followed, as did a guest role in Heartbeat in 1998. The same year he took on the small role of pigeon fancier Arthur in the hit film Little Voice, set in Scarborough and starring Brenda Blethyn, Jane Horrocks, Ewan McGregor, Michael Caine and Jim Broadbent. Feast also appeared in pantomimes, and on television chat shows during his two-year return in the public eye.

== Death ==
Feast died on 25 June 1999, aged 69, after his last illness which involved major abdominal surgery. This was less than six months after his character, Fred Gee, had been officially proclaimed as having died (offscreen) on Coronation Street, though the character had not been seen onscreen for almost 15 years.

== Filmography ==
Year	Title	Role	Notes
1975	All Creatures Great and Small	Farmer In Cinema	TV movie
1998	Little Voice	Arthur	
