= Annie Walker (Coronation Street) =

Fictional character in British soap opera

- Coronation Street character
- Portrayed by: Doris Speed
- Duration: 1960–1983
- First appearance: Episode 1 – 9 December 1960
- Last appearance: Episode 2351 – 12 October 1983
- Created by: Tony Warren
- Introduced by: Stuart Latham
- Book appearances: Coronation Street: The Complete Saga; Coronation Street: The War Years
In-universe information
- Occupation: Pub landlady; Mayoress of Weatherfield; Chairman of the L.V.C.; Barmaid
- Father: Edward Beaumont
- Mother: Florence Beaumont
- Husband: Jack Walker (until 1970)
- Sons: Billy Walker
- Daughters: Joan Davies
- Uncles: William Beaumont; Basil
- Aunts: Maude Beaumont; Molly Beaumont
- First cousins: Edwin Beaumont; Charles Beaumont; Alice Beaumont; Grace
- Other relatives: Arthur (second cousin); Isabella Scatterwood

Annie Walker is a fictional character in the ITV soap opera Coronation Street. She was played by actress Doris Speed from the series' first episode in 1960 until Speed retired from the role 23 years and 1,726 episodes later in 1983. Speed appeared as a guest of honour at the 30th birthday celebration of Coronation Street in 1990 which was hosted by Cilla Black.

The character of Annie has been noted as "snobbish" and "snooty" due to her condescending attitude and delusions of grandeur. Despite this, Annie proved to be one of the show's most popular characters and Speed received more fan mail than any other cast member at the time. For her service, Speed was later declared a "national treasure" by the media and received an MBE in 1977.

== Creation ==
Annie was one of the original characters in Coronation Street when the show began in 1960. Creator Tony Warren wrote the part with Doris Speed in mind, having worked with her before when he was a young actor on radio play Children's Hour. As the immaculately kept manager of the Rovers Return Inn, Annie appeared in the very first episode, broadcast live on 9 December 1960 and in the following episode her mild-mannered husband of over twenty years Jack (Arthur Leslie) was introduced. The pair went on to become the first great 'double act' of the series, and following the series' early success, Jack and Annie's two children were introduced - Billy (Ken Farrington) and Joan (June Barry), who arrived for Joan's wedding to teacher Gordon Davies (Calvin Malone) in 1961.

=== Departure ===
In 1983, a year of immense change for Coronation Street, the Daily Mirror published a story claiming that Doris Speed was older than she had claimed. Speed had claimed to be 70; she was in fact 84 at the time. Speed collapsed on seeing the article and was quickly written out of the show to give the actress time to recover. Shortly afterwards however, her home was burgled and Speed was admitted into a nursing home. She opted not to return to Coronation Street, and Annie made her final appearance on 12 October 1983. Her last line on the show was "Could you please give me three tins of anything, so that I can discharge my duty and go?" to Rita Fairclough (Barbara Knox) at a Bring and Buy sale.

== Storylines ==
Jack (Arthur Leslie) and Annie Walker were a popular couple in Coronation Street, and made a good team as landlord and landlady of the Rovers. However, Jack and Annie came close to splitting up in 1964 when Annie found out Jack had been making regular payments to a Mrs. Nicholls, and wrongly assumed she was a lover. The reality was that Jack was paying their son Billy's (Kenneth Farrington) rent as Billy had lost his job, but Annie left Jack instead of confronting him, and only came to regret her hastiness when coping without Jack at Egremont Hotel proved too much for her. Though innocent, Jack remained concerned that Annie would not return, though she eventually did and was deeply apologetic.

Later that year, the Walkers took in 15-year-old Lucille Hewitt (Jennifer Moss) as a ward when her father Harry (Ivan Beavis) and stepmother Concepta Hewitt (Doreen Keogh) moved to Ireland. Concepta had previously been a live-in barmaid at the Rovers before marrying Harry, and the Hewitts and the Walkers had been close. When Lucille refused to go with her parents, Annie volunteered to put her up while she finished her O-levels. Lucille was a different challenge to Annie than Billy or her daughter Joan (June Barry) had been. Annie refused to modernise her parenting approach, and found Lucille flighty and irresponsible, while Lucille found Annie cold and difficult to talk to, becoming closer to Jack.

Annie was an active member of the community and in 1966 her aspirations turned political, when Mrs Arkinstall (Lally Bowers) of the Federation of Women's Associations agreed to sponsor her application to stand as an independent candidate in the Council by-elections. She quickly got caught up in electioneering duties, putting them even above her duties as landlady. She was up against neighbour Len Fairclough (Peter Adamson), who during a debate accused Annie of being a mouthpiece for snotty women. They received the same number of votes on election day, and on a coin toss Len was elected Councillor.

The Walkers had another of their meaningless fall-outs in 1967 when Annie was dissatisfied with Jack's answers to a truth game and refused to let the matter drop, causing Jack to sleep in the spare room and later Albert Tatlock's (Jack Howarth) house to get away from Annie's nagging. Annie, unsure of where Jack was staying, got the mistaken impression that he was sleeping over at Elsie Tanner's (Pat Phoenix) house, and convinced herself they were having an affair. Jack could not believe Annie could think something so far-fetched but reassured her that he loved her and they reconciled.

In 1968, Lucille became involved with Gordon Clegg (Bill Kenwright), an accounting student whose protective mother Maggie Cooke (Irene Sutcliffe) had recently bought the Corner Shop. Annie objected to Gordon, fearing that his father Les's (John Sharp) alcoholism was hereditary, and because she suspected Maggie thought Gordon was too good for Lucille. The lovelorn couple ran away to get married but missed the train to Gretna Green and returned home, to their parents' relief. Annie's attitude towards Gordon changed when he became a qualified accountant - a man of education. The following year, Annie was once again on the wrong side of her children, with her racism towards Billy's girlfriend Jasmine Choong (Lucille Soong) causing Billy and Jasmine to split up. Annie was thrilled in 1969 when brewery rep Douglas Cresswell (William Fox) offered her and Jack a pub in Mallorca, while she was there after winning the "Perfect Landlady" competition arranged by Newton & Ridley. It was the chance she had been waiting for years, and for her sake Jack was also willing to go, however they were turned down at the last minute when Cresswell's boss decided they were too old to run the Mallorca bar.

It was a sad day in 1970 when Jack had a heart attack and died while visiting Joan in Derby. Annie was distraught but despite her grief was able to carry on with her job, taking over as licensee of the Rovers Return, with Billy moving to Weatherfield to keep an eye on her and help out at the pub when needed. The brewery was satisfied that with Billy around Annie could continue to function as landlady, though they did offer to make Billy licensee behind Annie's back, believing he would be the more ideal landlord, an offer he turned down. Lucille's future continued to worry Annie. After gaining good qualifications, Lucille grew into a lazy young woman who worked when it suited her, and when she did have a job, it tended to be somewhere Annie disapproved of, such as the Aquarius disco club, which to add insult to injury, was a Newton & Ridley house like the Rovers. She once offered to buy the Corner Shop for Lucille, but Lucille was not interested. Lucille eventually left for good in 1974 to live with Concepta in Ireland.

Annie's big moment finally came in 1973 when incoming Mayor of Weatherfield, Alf Roberts (Bryan Mosley), asked her to be his Mayoress and she accepted it graciously. However, no sooner had Annie and Alf been sworn in than Annie found out that Billy had been gambling using the pub's takings. Furious, Annie made barmaid Betty Turpin (Betty Driver) manager and cut off Billy's access to the Rovers' accounts, and the pair had a blazing row. Billy decided to leave Weatherfield to rebuild his life in Jersey, while Annie told the brewery she was retiring as there was now nothing left for her at the Rovers. She changed her mind when the regulars showed her a petition they had written, signed by 46 people, telling the brewery that she was the only landlady they wanted.

Billy made another return to Weatherfield in 1974, soon to be engaged to Deirdre Hunt (Anne Kirkbride). Annie threw herself into wedding preparations, although secretly she did not think much of Deirdre and disapproved of Billy paying for the wedding instead of Deirdre's widowed mother Blanche (Maggie Jones). With three weeks to go, Billy called off the wedding, deciding he no longer wanted to marry Deirdre, and returned to Jersey.

Although she was now living by herself at the Rovers, Annie did not inform the brewery of Billy's departure as she feared they would retire her. Later in the year, two thugs, Les Grimes (Mike Grady) and Neil Foxall (Terence Budd), broke into the Rovers in the night in search of valuables and money. Despite being unable to defend herself, Annie refused to be intimidated and defiantly told them her money was in the bank (in fact, there was money on the premises which she kept in a safe place). The thugs left after searching the place and finding nothing of value, and despite telling friends and staff she was fine Annie fell down the stairs the next day and was admitted to hospital. The brewery then discovered Annie's true living situation, however she was held in high enough esteem that she was offered the tenancy of a pub in Cheshire, rather than retirement. When informed of the brewery's decision by Warren Coates (Peter Settelen), an unflappable Annie immediately telephoned Douglas Cresswell, who put a stop to the plans. However, she agreed to take on a live-in cellarman, and hired pot-bellied widower Fred Gee (Fred Feast).

In her final years at the Rovers, age was no obstacle to Annie, and she continued to rule with an iron fist. In 1976, when her business was threatened by Renee Bradshaw's (Madge Hindle) application to turn the Corner Shop into an off-licence, Annie petitioned against her, but the matter was settled in court in favour of Renee. At 67, Annie decided to learn to drive, and to pass her test after fewer than 86 lessons - the number her friend and rival Nellie Harvey (Mollie Sugden) had taken. To the surprise of all (after her first lesson ended with her hitting a lamp post), she passed her test first time and bought a second-hand Rover 2000. Not long after getting the car, Annie was stopped by the police while doing a turn in the road, and was breathalysed. Much to her horror, the crystal turned green. A blood test taken at the police station proved Annie was below the limit, but by that time her companion Kitty Stonely (Stella Moray) had already spread the word among Annie's posh friends at the Lady Victuallers.

In 1977, the brewery held a party in the Rovers celebrating Annie's four decades as landlady, with Billy arriving as a surprise guest. The following year, a take-over bid at the brewery nearly caused Annie to step down as landlord in favour of Billy - to guarantee she could stay at the Rovers - but the bid fell through at the last minute. In 1979, Billy returned again to ask Annie for a loan to buy a wine bar. Annie was willing to give him the money but retracted the offer when Billy asked Deirdre to come with him; Deirdre was now a married woman, although separated. When Deirdre decided not to go with Billy, Annie handed the money over.

In 1981, Annie went on a cruise and left temporary manager Gordon Lewis (David Daker) in charge of the Rovers as she did not have faith in Fred to run it. She was shocked when she returned to find Gordon had replaced her staff. After relieving Gordon from his post, she had to earn back the respect of Betty and Bet Lynch (Julie Goodyear), who were angry that Annie had not trusted them. For the majority of her later years, Annie had four staff: Bet, Betty, Fred and cleaner Hilda Ogden (Jean Alexander). Out of them, Annie held Fred in especially low regard. When he married Eunice Nuttall (Meg Johnson) in 1981, Annie offered to let them live at the Rovers while they looked for a pub of their own. When they were turned down by the brewery because Eunice had been accused of stealing, Annie still wanted them out as she had found a new cellarman who was ready to start work. Fred later split from Eunice and Annie let him keep his job.

In late 1983, Annie took a break from the Rovers to stay with Joan, and in early 1984 her son Billy arrived to declare that his mother was "bowing out"; Annie had decided to retire without returning to tell her staff and friends personally. She convinced Billy to run the pub though his stay was very brief, as he had to sell the tenancy of the Rovers to pay his debts. Annie's death was never addressed in the show but subsequent references to her were in the past tense. After Betty's death in 2012, while clearing out Betty's house, Rita Sullivan (Barbara Knox), Emily Bishop (Eileen Derbyshire) and Stella Price (Michelle Collins) found a copy of Annie's will, in which she bequeathed various items to Betty, Billy, Lucille and Concepta. A further letter, from Annie to Betty, said that Annie had wanted Betty to take over the running of the Rovers after her death.

== Reception ==
After Speed's death, an appreciation of the character was published by The Guardian, in which Annie Walker was compared to former prime minister Margaret Thatcher, who had been nicknamed The Iron Lady, and the latter's son Mark:

Nobody answered her back and stayed to finish their pint. Everybody called her Mrs Walker except her husband and he called her the missus. She thought that was common. It is a potent, persistent creation. Who does Annie Walker remind you of. That firm hair, that careful elocution, that backbone and a certain understandable confusion between her job and Her Majesty's? Mrs Walker, the iron landlady, had one weakness, one touch of metal fatigue, her only son. Billy could have hidden at will behind a conger eel. While Annie was mayoress, he gambled away the pub's takings. Just good writing.

— Nancy Banks-Smith, "Putting polish on the clogs", The Guardian

In a 2021 Radio Times poll, Annie was voted as the seventh best "soap pub landlord", receiving 5% of the votes.
