= Hilda Ogden =

Fictional character from Coronation Street

- Coronation Street character
- Portrayed by: Jean Alexander
- Duration: 1964–1987
- First appearance: Episode 371; 8 July 1964
- Last appearance: Episode 2790; 25 December 1987
- Introduced by: Tim Aspinall
- Book appearances: Coronation Street: The Complete Saga; Coronation Street: The War Years
- Spin-off appearances: ITV Telethon (1990); The Women of Coronation Street (1998)
In-universe information
- Occupation: Cleaner; Housekeeper
- Father: Arnold Crabtree
- Mother: Florence Crabtree
- Brothers: Archie Crabtree; Norman Crabtree
- Husband: Stan Ogden (until 1984)
- Sons: Trevor Ogden; Tony Ogden
- Daughters: Irma Barlow; Sylvia Ogden
- Grandsons: Darren Barlow; Damien Ogden
- Granddaughters: Jayne Ogden
- Uncles: Ned
- Aunts: Gertie; Florrie
- First cousins: Agnes Swales; Isabel; Florrie; Nellie

Hilda Ogden is a fictional character from the British ITV soap opera Coronation Street, one of the best-known of all the regular characters in the serial, whose name became synonymous with a classic hard-working Northern working-class woman. She was played by Jean Alexander from 1964 to 1987.

For much of her period as a character in the Street, Hilda worked as cleaner of the Rovers Return Inn. A gossip and busybody, many of her storylines were used for comedic purposes, though the character was equally used for dramatic effect; a scene in which she wept over the spectacles of her recently deceased husband Stan (Bernard Youens) has been hailed as one of the most moving images in television history.

Alexander quit the role of Hilda in 1987 after 23 years. She reprised the role twice afterwards; in 1990 for a one-off appearance as part of an ITV Telethon and in 1998 for a spin-off video.

One of the serial's most popular characters, Hilda was voted the greatest TV character in a Radio Times poll of over 5,000 people. The typical appearance of Hilda, wearing hair curlers and a head scarf, has inspired art and catwalk themes. Despite various producers expressing their desire to see the character return, Alexander was openly critical about the direction Coronation Street had taken, vowing never to reprise the role of Hilda again.

Alexander had previously appeared in 1962 as Mrs. Webb, the landlady of Joan Akers (Anna Cropper), who abducted baby Christopher Hewitt (Stephen Ward).

== Development ==
=== Characterisation ===
Hilda Ogden, with her trademark hair curlers and pinny, has been described as "the classic hard-working class Northern woman. With a voice like breaking glass and a temper to match". Actress Jean Alexander explained her interpretation of Hilda's head scarf and curler look: "Like Hilda, my roots were in Liverpool and that's where I first noticed the curlers and headscarf look. The curlers were put under the headscarf by the factory girls. They had their hair tied up and scarves like that to stop their fashionable long hair getting caught up in the machinery at work. They had the curlers in place in case they got asked out on a date, so they'd be ready for a night out after the shift." Alexander stated in 2010 that she based Hilda on bits of differing, eccentric people she had seen in her youth in Liverpool.

A term that has been described as synonymous with Hilda Ogden is "busybody". Critic for The Guardian, Grace Dent, has suggested that Hilda "spent the 70s providing an unofficial town-crier service for Coronation Street scandal. Hilda was known to sleep propped up in bed with one eye open so she could see what time Ken Barlow (William Roache)'s female friends left, (or what time they were carried out in bodybags. Ken's never had much luck with women.)". She added that Hilda was the mould that other popular soap gossips were made from, including Dot Cotton (June Brown) from EastEnders, Lynda Snell from The Archers and Martha Huber from Desperate Housewives. Following Alexanders death, Hilda's curlers, headscarf and pinny were put up for auction by her family.

=== The Ogdens ===
Hilda and her husband Stan were voted Britain's top romantic TV couple in 2002.

The Ogdens, Hilda and her husband Stan (Bernard Youens), have been hailed as one of Coronation Street's favourite couples. The bickering pair stayed together through mishap and financial difficulty for twenty years until Youens died on 27 August 1984, forcing the writers of the soap to kill off Stan on-screen. A scene following Stan's screen funeral, showing Hilda weeping at the sight of Stan's spectacles, has been described as "one of the most moving moments in TV history" and "instrumental in winning [Alexander] the Royal Television Society's Best Performance Award for 1984–1985". Neil Marland, who worked as Granada Television's stills photographer for 30 years, has described the scene as terribly poignant, adding, "Everyone was crying and the camera tracked in – she had to undo his handkerchief, and in it were his glasses. She broke down sobbing. And, of course, I had to do a picture of this. So I left her for a minute or so sobbing. Then, as I got nearer, I just went, 'Jean, Jean...' And she sat bolt upright and said, 'What picture do you want Neil? I'm only acting'. It was just amazing because everyone on the floor was in floods of tears."

Commenting on the screen partnership, Alexander has said, "It was a real pleasure working with Bernard Youens, who played my screen husband, Stan. Any success I have had is really down to Bernard because we worked well as a team and each knew how the other would want to play a scene. It was a happy screen partnership but it was strictly professional. We didn't socialise after work." Alexander has stated that the Ogdens were a brilliant set-up: "They were the only couple in the street who were married – permanently. They were the only ones who owned their own house where everyone else rented, they stayed together and didn't stray or have affairs and, yes, they bickered among themselves but let anyone else criticise either of them and they would be up in arms."

Hilda and Stan Ogden were voted Britain's top romantic TV couple in 2002, in a poll of more than 5,000 people carried out by NTL:Home. They beat off competition from Friends' couple Monica Geller and Chandler Bing (Courteney Cox and Matthew Perry) and Dot and Jim Branning from EastEnders (Brown and John Bardon). In 2005 the couple topped another poll when the Ogdens were voted ITV's favourite TV characters in a survey by Broadcast magazine, which took place to coincide with the 50th anniversary of the network. They beat Minder's Arthur Daley and Prime Suspect's DCI Jane Tennison, who took second and third place respectively.

=== Departure ===
After 23 years playing Hilda, Alexander decided to leave Coronation Street in 1987. According to Alexander in 2010, it was the right time to leave as the writers had run out of ideas for Hilda and as a character, Hilda had run out of steam. She added, "Her other half had gone and she would have just scraped along. I didn't want that." Alexander went to see the show's producer Bill Podmore to inform him she did not want to renew her contract.

Her decision to leave prompted an outcry from fans and a "Save Hilda" campaign was launched, as many did not realise that the actress had made her own decision to depart. Hilda's final scenes in the programme were aired on Christmas Day 1987, when the locals in the Rovers Return joined Hilda in what has been described as a "stirring rendition" of "Wish Me Luck as You Wave Me Goodbye".

On-screen, Hilda departed for Hartington, Derbyshire, to make a new life for herself as the housekeeper for Doctor Lowther. 27 million viewers watched. It remains the highest-rated episode in Coronation Street's history. It has been described as the most moving scene in Coronation Street that did not involve a death. The writer behind the "memorable" episode depicting Hilda's departure, which attracted a record soap opera audience, was Leslie Duxbury.

Since her departure in 1987, various producers have expressed their desire to see Hilda back on Coronation Street. In 1990, Alexander reprised the role after two-and-a-half years as part of ITV's 27-hour charity telethon. The episode showed her visiting Stan's grave. In 1998, the character was resurrected again, as part of a special direct to video film.

However, in 2005 Alexander ruled out ever returning to the role of Hilda Ogden, due to Coronation Street's overemphasis on sex and "who's sleeping with whom". She also criticised the soap for not being fun enough and she disapproved of the modern storylines, saying some are allowed to "drag on forever". She added:

Times have changed and there are things going on in Weatherfield now that Hilda definitely wouldn't have approved of! People keep asking if I will ever go back to the Street but I definitely won't because I don't think it ever really works when people go back again. I know the programme tries to reflect life and in Hilda's time it was more simple and cosy. Today, life and attitudes have changed and permissiveness has crept up on us. So now it is all about who's sleeping with whom. The programme may reflect life, but equally young people are being influenced by what they see in it. Even girls of 13 think they absolutely must have boyfriends, otherwise people will think they aren't normal. Youngsters get rushed into things too quickly before they have had a chance to live. I don't like so much emphasis on sex. I also wish there was more fun in Coronation Street. There used to be much more comedy. And whereas a storyline would usually be played out within three weeks, today certain storylines seem to drag on for ever. I'm glad I was there in those earlier, more gentle years. I enjoyed my time as Hilda and it is lovely that viewers still remember her with such affection.

— Jean Alexander, Manchester Evening News

A spokesperson for the soap responded to Alexander's criticism, saying, "We don't subscribe to Jean's opinions. Every week 12 million people across the country tune in to be entertained by the drama in Coronation Street." Alexander reportedly declined to return as Hilda as part of Coronation Street's 50th anniversary celebrations in December 2010. They allegedly offered her a large sum of money but her agent Joan Reddin stated: "She's not interested in getting involved again." When interviewed in 2010, Alexander further discussed her reasons for not wanting to return to the role of Hilda. She said, "It would be impossible for me to recreate Hilda. She would be totally different from the scrubber who left the Street [...] I'm sorry, after 23 years I couldn't recreate that character as she would be now – and I didn't want to play her as she was. Hilda would be about 91 now. She left to be housekeeper for the lovely doctor and be part of a village community. She has status now which is something she always wanted. I have changed so I'm sure she has. And I think the fans would be disappointed. It would have spoiled the memories people had of her."

== Storylines ==
Hilda and her husband Stan (Bernard Youens) are first featured in Coronation Street in June 1964. A working class couple, beset with financial woes and few friends, many of the more established characters look down on the Ogdens. Hilda works as a charwoman, cleaning the Rovers Return Inn, Mike Baldwin's (Johnny Briggs) factory and private homes, while Stan cleans windows.

Hilda and Stan have four children. Two children, Sylvia and Tony, are not seen on the series, with the explanation that they are taken into care, when Stan beat them while drunk. The two unseen children are rarely mentioned and by the 1970s, Hilda and Stan often state that they have two children, naming Trevor as their "only son". Their other children are seen on the programme and are named Irma (Sandra Gough), (although she was born Freda Ogden and had chosen the name Irma when she left home) and Trevor (Jonathan Collins/Don Hawkins). Trevor steals money and runs away within the first six months of arriving on the Street, writing back home to ask Hilda to disown him. Hilda's daughter Irma works at the Corner Shop, and eventually marries David Barlow (Alan Rothwell). Irma is crushed when David and her child are killed in Australia, in 1970. Irma returns home for a few years, but then vanishes, with the explanation being she has moved to Wales, and later Canada. Trevor eventually marries and has two children, but is ashamed of the life his parents led, and only makes the occasional visit.

Lodging with the Ogdens from 1980 to 1983, was Eddie Yeats (Geoffrey Hughes), their surrogate son, and, after Stan dies in November 1984 – just a year after celebrating their ruby wedding – Hilda gets extra money, by allowing Kevin (Michael Le Vell), and Sally Seddon (Sally Dynevor), to live in one of her vacant rooms. Shortly afterwards Hilda's employers, the affluent Doctor Lowther (David Scase) and his wife (June Broughton), make the decision to sell their home and move to Hartington. However, on the night that Hilda helps Mrs. Lowther pack away her treasured possessions, burglars break into the house and violently assault them both. Doctor Lowther, who has gone out to get a takeaway meal, is horrified to discover his wife suffering what would be a fatal heart attack, and Hilda seriously injured.

Although she makes a full recovery physically, mentally she becomes afraid to be in her own home. When Doctor Lowther asks her to move to his cottage in Hartington and be his housekeeper, she jumps at the chance. When Hilda leaves the programme on Christmas Day 1987, she sings "Wish Me Luck As You Wave Me Goodbye", in her trademark trilling voice; it is watched by an aggregated audience of 26.65 million people, one of the highest audiences in British television history.

Hilda's most remembered attributes are her hair curlers which she almost always wears, her pinny, and her "muriel" in her living room, which first shows a scene of Alpine mountains, but later changes to a coastal scene, with three duck ornaments flying over them (the middle duck, in a nose-dive position, was Jean Alexander's idea). She considers herself clairvoyant, and offers teacup readings.

== Reception ==
The character of Hilda Ogden was very popular with the British public — in 1982 she came fourth behind the Queen Mother, Queen Elizabeth II, and Diana, Princess of Wales in a poll of the most recognisable women in Britain. Hilda Ogden has been branded as the "greatest-ever soap character" and "loved by millions the world over". In 2004 she was voted the greatest soap character in a Radio Times survey of 5,000 viewers, despite the character not physically appearing on screen for 17 years at the time. Actress Jean Alexander commented on the accolade: "I'm very flattered. It came totally out of the blue. I knew nothing about it. Friends rang to tell me and I was completely taken aback. I am surprised that so many people remembered Hilda, considering it was so long ago that I played her." She added in 2005 that she was amazed by the nation's enduring affection for Hilda. She said: "I've no idea why. I'm totally flummoxed. If they remember Hilda with such affection, then I'm happy and very flattered.. ..It means that I did a good job and that's what I set out to do. I had 23 wonderful years playing Hilda. I worked with some of the Street's legends – Pat Phoenix (Elsie Tanner), Violet Carson (Ena Sharples), one of TV's greatest characters, Jack Howarth (Albert Tatlock), Arthur Leslie and Doris Speed (Jack and Annie Walker), all now sadly gone."

Various celebrities are known to be among her fans, including Michael Parkinson, Laurence Olivier, writer Willis Hall, the former Poet Laureate, John Betjeman and Russell Harty, who formed themselves into the British League for Hilda Ogden.

In 1984, a storyline involving Hilda and her husband Stan resulted in monetary claims to the council of an increase of 200%. Off-screen, actor Bernard Youens had become ill, so the writers at Coronation Street excused his screen absence by making Stan have an injury – he hurt his toe on a pavement and was bed-ridden. In the storyline, Hilda discovered that if a paving stone is sticking up over a certain measurement, a claim can be made against the council. Hilda sued Weatherfield council and won a payout. Councils all across the UK were reportedly "up in arms against Coronation Street", because subsequently, claims against them for people tripping up over paving stones that were three-quarters of an inch high, increased by 200 per cent.

== In other media ==
In 1998 a straight-to-video Coronation Street spin-off film was released. It was entitled The Women Of Coronation Street and featured clips of the show's most famous females. The video saw the brief return of Hilda Ogden, who had not been seen in the soap since 1987; Betty Turpin (Betty Driver) travelled to meet her at her new home. A spokesperson for Granada Television commented, "It shows what happens when Betty goes up to visit Hilda Ogden at her home in Derbyshire. She used to do cleaning work for a doctor and when he died he left her the house in gratitude. It'll be a souvenir fans want to keep." The original character design of Fireman Sam character Dilys Price was based on Hilda.

== In popular culture ==
An image of Hilda Ogden in her signature hair rollers and head scarf has been used in artist David Knopov's series of silkscreen prints. The artist said Lenny Henry, Bill Nighy and Elvis Costello are among the famous names who have bought 'a Hilda'.

Hilda Ogden was cited as one of the characters to influence New York's elite fashion scene in 2004. The straight-laced tweed and hair rollers "granny chic" style of Sixties Britain, much of the look was derived from early episodes of Coronation Street. Fashion stylist Katie Grand said: "There's something very interesting about working class Britain in the early Sixties. Coronation Street was black-and-white and so grimy. They just looked so cool. Hilda Ogden has her hair in curlers but is also in a fabulous tweed jacket and a really nice blouse."

The video for one of the rock band Queen's music videos, "I Want to Break Free", was based on characters from Coronation Street. Lead singer Freddie Mercury was said not to be a fan of any soap opera; however, when he was at home he would watch Coronation Street. So, in the song's video, the members of the band dressed in drag as some of the soap's most famous female characters. Mercury's style was based loosely on the character Bet Lynch (Julie Goodyear), while Brian May's style was modeled loosely on Hilda Ogden. The song peaked at number 3 in the UK singles chart, and remained in the chart for fifteen consecutive weeks from its release in April 1984.

In the 1980s, Boy George criticised the most controversial video of "Relax" by Frankie Goes to Hollywood by saying it represented a "Hilda Ogden view of homosexuality."

In 2017, a longstanding character in BBC Radio 4's The Archers, Peggy Woolley inherits a cat named 'Hilda Ogden', after her hairdresser Fabrice breaks up with his partner and moves to a no-pets apartment. Since her arrival in Ambridge though she proved fierce, and drew blood more than once.
