= Alf Roberts =

Fictional character from Coronation Street

- Coronation Street character
- Portrayed by: Bryan Mosley
- Duration: 1961–1963, 1967, 1971–1999
- First appearance: Episode 18; 8 February 1961
- Last appearance: Episode 4535; 1 January 1999
- Created by: Tony Warren
- Introduced by: Stuart Latham (1961); H. V. Kershaw (1962, 1967); Margaret Morris (1963); Leslie Duxbury (1971)
In-universe information
- Occupation: Postal worker Shopkeeper; Councillor
- Father: Sidney Roberts
- Mother: Eileen Roberts
- Brothers: Malcolm Roberts
- Wife: Phyllis Plant (until 1972); Renee Bradshaw (1978–1980); Audrey Potter (1985–1999)
- Stepsons: Stephen Reid
- Stepdaughters: Gail Platt

Alf Roberts, OBE is a fictional character from the British ITV soap opera Coronation Street, played by Bryan Mosley. He ran a grocery shop at No. 15 and was involved in local politics, including two spells as mayor of Weatherfield. The character first appeared on the programme in 1961 on a recurring basis, before finally becoming a regular in 1971 and remaining in the series until he died on 1 January 1999.

== Creation and development ==
The character first appeared on the Street in 1961, working as a sorter at the post office alongside Frank Barlow. He appeared intermittently until 1967. Although occasionally mentioned, Alf was not seen again until 1971. When he returned, he continued to work at the post office, albeit now in a supervisor's role.

=== Departure ===
The character was written out of the show when actor Bryan Mosley became seriously ill. Mosley stressed that he "wanted to carry on" and "had no intentions of leaving". After Mosley fell ill in January 1998, he returned six months later in July insisting "The Street is in my blood. I'll never quit." Mosley was then forced to retire due to his ill health. A Granada spokesman claimed that "Bryan's one of the Street greats, and his send-off has to be one of its most moving scenes. That is just as he would wish."

After Alf was killed off, Mosley, who was five years younger than the character he portrayed, gave an interview where he expressed his disappointment at being forced out, refuting claims that he wasn't up to the demands of filming: "I feel like a new man, the best I have felt for three years, and I kept telling the producers I was getting better all the time." However, he understood the difficult position his colleagues were in: "When I came back, I was just pleased to be there, although I looked like something someone had dug up. I couldn't breathe properly. "It was a strain on everyone else because they thought: 'Is he going to drop dead, or what?' In fact, I looked iller than I was. But, of course, my appearance had changed so much." He clarified his feelings: "Now I will miss Alf. But I won't miss the schedule."

Mosley died of a heart attack on 9 February 1999, six weeks after his final appearance on the show.

== Storylines ==
Alf was married first to Phyllis, who was mentioned by name but never made an appearance on screen. She was engaged to Alf's brother but Alf crashed his car, causing his brother's death. Out of a sense of duty, he offered to marry Phyllis but the marriage was a loveless one. Nevertheless, he was very upset when she died of cancer in 1972.

Alf became very close to Maggie Clegg (Irene Sutcliffe), who owned the corner shop on Coronation Street. Attractive, sympathetic, and a good listener, she seemed to him to be the perfect wife. However, when he proposed, she gently turned him down, unable to marry someone she did not love just to avoid being lonely. Alf was very hurt, doubly so when, she married wealthy businessman Ron Cooke and moved to Zaire shortly afterward. In 1973, Alf needed a partner when he became mayor of Weatherfield so Annie Walker (Doris Speed), the social-climbing landlady of The Rovers Return Inn, invited herself to become Mayoress and Alf was forced to agree. Annie did a good job - she considered herself to be Weatherfield's First Lady - but her snobbishness and pretensions often infuriated and exasperated Alf.

In 1978, Alf married Renee Bradshaw (Madge Hindle), who now owned the corner shop. Theirs was an awkward courtship - Alf withdrew his first proposal, telling Renee that he had been drunk when he asked her - but when he proposed again, they married. The marriage seemed doomed from the start - Alf punched Renee's stepfather, Joe Hibbert, at the reception for suggesting that the only reason he had married Renee was to get the corner shop. Renee, however, made it clear that the shop was hers and Alf should continue to work at the post office. After a lorry crashed into the pub in 1979, burying Alf under tons of wood, the couple re-assessed their lives. They decided to buy a sub-post office in Grange-Over-Sands in 1980 and Renee took driving lessons. It was while learning to drive that Renee stalled Alf's car at a red traffic light in a country lane. While Alf got out of the car to change places, a lorry coming the other way hit the car and Renee was killed. Alf, who had been drinking, was unharmed and later told Ken Barlow (William Roache) that he felt guilty as seconds before Renee died, they were arguing about her driving and this was the last thing he ever said to her.

Alf inherited the shop from Renee, and, over the next few years, he watched Audrey Potter (Sue Nicholls) come and go. Audrey was very unlike Maggie and Renee for she was an unashamed good-time girl, her heart as big as a man's wallet. When Alf needed someone to watch his shop while away on holiday, he asked Audrey to do it. When he got back, he found she had set herself up in the back of the shop as a hair stylist. Alf was impressed by her initiative and kept her on, later causing controversy when he painted Renee's name out of the shop sign. Alf and Audrey connected well, and Alf enjoyed being around someone with such youthful energy. However, when Alf suggested marriage to Audrey, she (having been forewarned) turned him down and resigned from the shop before returning to an ex-boyfriend. Alf continued to run the corner shop, with various assistants, including Deirdre Barlow (Anne Kirkbride). He also continued as a local councillor until ill-health forced his retirement. In 1985, Alf had the shop converted into a self-service establishment. The Corner Shop name was retained newly painted in red on the sign over the frontage, with "Alf's Mini Market" painted on the window.

Audrey returned in 1985 after yet another failed relationship. Alf was keen to pick up where they left off and, older and wiser, Audrey appreciated the attention and kindness that Alf lavished on her. He proposed to her again, and this time she accepted. They married two weeks later, living first in the flat over the shop, then at No. 11 Coronation Street before buying a semi-detached house on Grasmere Drive where Audrey still lives. Alf lost his council seat to his employee, Deirdre, in May 1987 and suffered a heart attack as a result. Despite this, he was re-elected in the following term's elections. The local council decided to rename Coronation Street "Alfred Roberts Place" in his honour, and Alf was hurt when the locals opposed it. He was also made an OBE for services to local Government. When Alf became mayor for the second time, Audrey declined to be mayoress, and Alf asked Betty Turpin (Betty Driver) instead. A compromise was later reached. When Alf retired from the council, Audrey held his seat for a while.

On New Year's Eve 1998, Alf and Audrey attended Audrey's grandson, Nick Tilsley's (Adam Rickitt), 18th birthday party at her daughter, Gail Platt's (Helen Worth) house. Worn out from dancing, Alf slumped onto an armchair where he suffered a massive fatal stroke and died.

== Reception ==
British journalist Brian Reade claimed that losing Alf's character is losing "not just a gem of a character but the umbilical cord that links it with its roots." He also stated that "even those of us who for 30-odd years have viewed him as a whingeing tub of lard today mourn his passing." Brian believed that "when Alf goes an era goes with him. All the Street's original fans have left to remind them of a better time is the chimneys, the music and Betty's hot-pot. Will there ever be another Alf? Will there flamin' heck as like."

In 1998 upon the announcement that Bryan Mosley was leaving Coronation Street, an insider at Granada TV claimed "Bryan Mosley is a Coronation Street legend and no one wanted to see him ever leave". The same insider also stated that the scriptwriters were told that the characters death was to be "handled with an incredible amount of sympathy."

The Independent published an article by Anthony Hayward which stated that actor Bryan Mosley made his character "one of the most enduring and sympathetic characters in Coronation Street." However, as an actor, Bryan once claimed that his character "was sometimes regarded as a bit dull", and that there was "not a lot in him that’s not been explored on screen". He believed that there was "something of a fighter in Alf. He was in the Army during the war and probably had quite a difficult war. He's still interested in the weapons of the 1940s. All that has been glossed over. Part of the way I play him is that he has this experience behind the staid image. He has been to strip clubs with Ray Langton and Ernest Bishop, and he had a girlfriend called Donna Parker that no one in the street, only viewers, knew."

More than 18 million viewers viewed the character’s last episode. An editor of an article produced by The Guardian following the character’s death claimed that "if you saw a hat at all in the Rovers, you knew Alf was under it". He also claimed that "Alf so loved little shops that he regularly married or tried to marry women who owned them".

Sue Nicholls opined that the decision to marry her character off to Alf may have contributed to Audrey's longevity. Otherwise she may have been just another "tart with a heart passing through."
