= Meg Johnson (actress) =

English actress (1936–2023)

- Johnson in Emmerdale
- Born: Margaret Mary Green; 30 September 1936; Manchester, England
- Died: 1 July 2023 (aged 86); Rochdale, Greater Manchester, England
- Occupation: Actress
- Years active: 1961–2020
- Spouses: Hibbert Johnson (m. 1956, divorced) Charles Foster (m. 1981; died 2023)
- Children: 2

Margaret Mary Foster (30 September 1936 – 1 July 2023), better known as Meg Johnson, was an English actress. Over a career spanning almost six decades, she became known for her soap opera roles as Eunice Gee in Coronation Street, Brigid McKenna in Brookside, and Pearl Ladderbanks in Emmerdale. She also appeared in musicals including Chicago and Follies.

== Early life ==
Johnson was born Margaret Mary Green in Manchester on 30 September 1936 to Eleanor (née James), a former bus conductress, and Stan Green, a brewery foreman. Johnson was evacuated to Bolton during World War II and made her stage debut there, aged six, singing and dancing at the Grand Theatre. After developing asthma, she began singing lessons to improve her breathing.

== Career ==
Johnson's first professional acting role came in May 1961, when she was 24, in a television series titled Here's Harry. She continued in the show until 1964. Subsequent roles included Family Solicitor (1961) and The Referees (1961). Johnson first appeared in a few episodes of the ITV television soap opera Coronation Street in 1972 as a tipsy woman and in 1976 as Brenda Holden, before being cast as Eunice Gee in 1981, a role she would play with recurring appearances until 1999.

In the 1980s, Johnson worked with Victoria Wood, appearing in several episodes of her shows Victoria Wood: As Seen on TV, as well as Victoria Wood. In 1997, Johnson appeared in the West End theatre revival of Chicago as Mama Morton. She also appeared in theatre productions of Follies and Gypsy.

From 2000 to 2003, Johnson appeared in the Channel 4 soap opera Brookside as Brigid McKenna until the soap's cancellation. Later in 2003, Johnson was cast as Pearl Ladderbanks in the ITV soap opera Emmerdale, although due to the number of episodes per week of Brookside being reduced in its later months, her last appearances as Brigid aired after she had already been seen on screen as Pearl. Johnson played the role of Pearl until March 2020.

== Personal life ==
In 1956, Johnson married Hibbert Johnson. The marriage produced a son and a daughter, but later ended in divorce.

Johnson was married to English actor and ITV Granada presenter Charles Foster from 1981 until his death on 23 February 2023.

== Death ==
Johnson died at a care home in Rochdale called the Willows on 1 July 2023, aged 86. In a statement, her family said that she "had dementia for the last few years, but battled on personally and professionally regardless". Emmerdale paid tribute to her on its social media accounts, describing Johnson as "a kind and wonderful lady, full of warmth and always with a twinkle in her eye" and added that she would be "greatly missed by everyone who knew her".

== Filmography ==
| Year | Title | Role | Notes |
|---|---|---|---|
| 1961–1964 | Here's Harry | Unknown | Recurring role; 5 episodes |
| 1961 | Family Solicitor | Mary Carslake | 3 episodes |
| 1961 | The Referees | Waitress | Television film |
| 1964 | Comedy Playhouse | Office girl | Episode: "The Mascot" |
| 1972 | Country Matters | Barmaid | Episode: "Crippled Bloom" |
| 1972 | Coronation Street | Tipsy woman | 1 episode |
| 1973 | Nearest and Dearest | Miss Pringle | Episode: "Get Out of That" |
| 1974 | How's Your Father? | Alice Henthorn | Episode: "Who Was That Lady?" |
| 1975 | The Life of Riley | Betty Butcher | Episode: "Uneasy Riders" |
| 1975 | Play for Today | Vera | Episode: "Wednesday Love" |
| 1976 | Coronation Street | Brenda Holden | 4 episodes |
| 1976 | Crown Court | Tricia Dibden | 2 episodes |
| 1976–1977 | Yanks Go Home | Phoebe Sankey | Lead role; 13 episodes |
| 1978 | Strangers | Barmaid | Episode: "Paying Guests" |
| 1978–1979 | Empire Road | Mrs. Ridley | Starring role; 4 episodes |
| 1979 | Two Up, Two Down | Woman in precinct | Episode: "What's Yours Is Mine" |
| 1979 | Mother Nature's Bloomers | Various | All 6 episodes |
| 1980 | Watch All Night | Dianne Eveling | Episode: "Night People" |
| 1980 | Strangers | Woman in suburbs | Episode: "Armed and Dangerous" |
| 1980–1981 | The Good Companions | Effie | 2 episodes |
| 1981–1982, 1999 | Coronation Street | Eunice Gee | Regular role; 72 episodes |
| 1981 | The Olympian Way | Violet | 2 episodes |
| 1985–1987 | Victoria Wood: As Seen on TV | Various | 4 episodes |
| 1986 | The Practice | Mary O'Dowd | 2 episodes |
| 1989 | Split Ends | Mrs. Emery | Episode: "Tangles" |
| 1989 | Victoria Wood | Connie | Episode: "Mens Sana in Thingummy Doodah" |
| 1989 | Victoria Wood | Saundra | Episode: "Over to Pam" |
| 1993 | Taggart | Mrs. Jeffrey | Episode: "Fatal Inheritance" |
| 1993 | Lovejoy | Maureen | Episode: "Ducking and Diving" |
| 1993 | Chris Cross | Nurse Garbo | Episode: "It's a Jungle in There" |
| 1995–1996 | Hollyoaks | Aunt Rose | 2 episodes |
| 1998–1999 | The Wild House | Aunt Yvette | Regular role |
| 1999 | Rab C. Nesbitt | Speaker of the House | Episode: "Commons" |
| 2000 | Peak Practice | Freda Norton | Episode: "Turning Tides" |
| 2000–2003 | Brookside | Brigid McKenna | Regular role |
| 2000 | The Thing About Vince... | Sylvia | Series 1: Episode 3 |
| 2003–2020 | Emmerdale | Pearl Ladderbanks | Regular role; 1,065 episodes |
| 2011 | Emmerdale: Paddy and Marlon's Big Night In | Pearl Ladderbanks | Spin-off film |
