= Leslie Duxbury =

Leslie John Duxbury (13 June 1926 – 17 October 2005) was a British newspaper sports writer and columnist born in Great Harwood, Lancashire. He turned his attention to television and became a writer for the ITV1 soap opera, Coronation Street, retiring from the series in 1991.
