= Betty Turpin =

Fictional character from Coronation Street

- Coronation Street character
- Portrayed by: Betty Driver
- Duration: 1969–2011
- First appearance: Episode 881; 2 June 1969
- Last appearance: Episode 7610; 27 May 2011
- Introduced by: H. V. Kershaw
- Book appearances: Coronation Street: The Complete Saga; Coronation Street: The War Years
- Spin-off appearances: The Women of Coronation Street (1998)
In-universe information
- Occupation: Shop assistant Barmaid; Caterer
- Father: Harold Preston
- Mother: Margaret Preston
- Sisters: Maggie Cooke
- Husband: Cyril Turpin (until 1974); Billy Williams (1995–1997)
- Sons: Gordon Clegg
- Grandsons: Peter Clegg
- Uncles: Jim
- Aunts: Maud; Ethel

Betty Turpin (also Williams) is a fictional character from the ITV soap opera Coronation Street, portrayed by former music hall star Betty Driver. Driver was cast as Betty in 1969, after first auditioning for the role of Hilda Ogden, which was given to Jean Alexander. The character arrived in Coronation Street to help her sister Maggie Cooke (Irene Sutcliffe) run the corner shop, and since then had a number of storylines which saw her become twice widowed, and mother to an illegitimate son.

For most of her tenure in the show, Betty worked as a barmaid in the soap's Rovers Return Inn, where she created a signature dish, known as Betty's hotpot.

Driver died in October 2011, and Betty was subsequently written out, with the character dying off-screen from an illness in April 2012.

== Creation ==
Betty Driver, who had been performing since she was eight years old, retired from acting in her late forties to run hotels in Cheshire and Derbyshire. It was here that she was spotted by one of her customers, Harry Kershaw, producer of Coronation Street, who persuaded her to audition for the role of Hilda Ogden in 1964; she eventually had to turn the role down as she was tied into an advertising contract with Procter & Gamble and they refused to release her. The part of Hilda eventually went to Jean Alexander. Driver has commented, "Harry Kershaw, producer of Coronation Street, persuaded me to audition for Hilda Ogden – just think I could have been wearing curlers for 30 years." In 1969, she was cast as the new character, Betty Turpin.

Following her first appearance in 1969, Driver remained in the role of Betty continuously. In a 2006 interview she laughed off the notion of retirement, saying: "From day one on The Street everyone has been very kind to me. In fact, I'm godmother to Bill Roache's son. So as long as they want me, I'm happy to stay. The Street is like home and they really are my family." She confirmed her intention to remain on the show in 2010, when the character celebrated her 90th birthday. In May 2010, the News of the World reported that Driver had decided to retire, just prior to the actress's 90th birthday. Driver was distressed by the rumour, and assured producer Phil Collinson of her intention to remain with the soap, and was told that Betty was very much a part of plans for the series' upcoming 50th anniversary celebrations. Driver died on 15 October 2011, having appeared in over 2,800 episodes of Coronation Street.

== Development ==
=== Backstory ===
Betty was born at 6 Tile Street, Weatherfield on 4 February 1920 to Harold and Margaret Preston. During World War II, she had an affair with serviceman Ted Farrell (Gerald Sim), resulting in a son, Gordon (Bill Kenwright; Geoffrey Leesley). Ted left her to return to his family and Gordon was adopted by Betty's sister Maggie (Irene Sutcliffe) and her husband Les Clegg (John Sharp). Betty celebrated the end of the war with her sweetheart Billy Williams (Frank Mills), to whom she had lost her virginity. The two lost touch, and in 1949, Betty married policeman Cyril Turpin (William Moore).

=== Storylines ===
Betty and her husband Cyril move to Weatherfield in June 1969, helping her sister Maggie to run the local corner shop following the break-up of Maggie's marriage to Les Clegg. Maggie, however, resents Betty's interference, and persuades landlord Jack Walker (Arthur Leslie) to give Betty a job as a barmaid at the Rovers Return Inn public house. Betty clashes with the landlady Annie Walker (Doris Speed), who fears that Jack may find her attractive, and fires Betty as a result. Betty takes a job in a rival pub, and returns only when Annie apologises. Betty becomes close friends with fellow barmaid Bet Lynch (Julie Goodyear), who uses Betty as a chaperone on dates, on occasion lodges with her, and frequently seeks her advice in running her life.

Cyril's employment as a policeman causes Betty problems when Keith Lucas (David Webb), a man he has previously arrested, begins stalking her. She initially refrains from telling Cyril, fearing that he will get into trouble. When Cyril finds out, he attacks Lucas with a piece of lead piping and has to leave the police force. Betty has a breakdown when Cyril dies of a heart attack in 1974, leaving her only £859. In the same year the truth about her illegitimate son is revealed; she also acquires a ginger cat named Marmaduke for extra companionship. Betty builds a relationship with Gordon, though he upsets her occasionally, particularly when he neglects to invite her to his wedding.

Betty is mugged in 1982 by Raymond Attwood (Joe Searby) from Ken Barlow's (William Roache) youth club; she ends up in hospital with a broken arm. This leads to a reunion with Ted, the man who fathered Gordon, though he is unaware of his son's existence. Ted visits Betty in hospital after reading about her mugging in a newspaper. Betty agonises over whether to tell Ted about Gordon, but decides against it, preferring not to stir up the past.

On the fiftieth anniversary of VE Day in 1995, Betty is reunited with her wartime sweetheart Billy. The two marry several months later, and Gordon gives his mother away. They live happily together until Billy also dies of a heart attack in 1997. Betty becomes famous in Weatherfield for her hotpots, which come under scrutiny in the early 1990s when it is believed that they are contaminated. She is cleared of all wrongdoing when it is discovered that beer, not food, is responsible for a spate of stomach upsets. Betty acts as lady mayoress alongside mayor Alf Roberts (Bryan Mosley) when his wife Audrey (Sue Nicholls) has no interest in fulfilling her civic duties. This includes accompanying him to receive his OBE from the Queen, much to Audrey's chagrin.

The Street's residents are her family and she doesn't want to be far from them. When she's finally had enough of standing behind the bar, she'll probably go to live in Wimbledon where Gordon and his family have a home – but, even then, her heart will remain in Coronation Street.

— Daran Little on Betty's future.

In 1999, Betty celebrates 30 years of working at The Rovers Return with a party attended by all the regulars. She considers retiring in 2002 and briefly moves to Wimbledon to be with Gordon and his wife Caroline (Elaine Donnelly; Sarah Thurstan). Feeling that Caroline does not want her there, Betty considers moving into a retirement home; however, she is convinced to stay in Weatherfield by her close friend Emily Bishop (Eileen Derbyshire). Around the time of Betty's 40th anniversary at The Rovers Return, she is sacked by new manager Poppy Morales (Sophiya Haque) after clashing with her on several occasions. Landlord Steve McDonald (Simon Gregson) eventually tires of Poppy's poor treatment of the staff and fires her. Betty is reinstated, and plays the fairy godmother in the 2009 Rovers Return Christmas pantomime performance of Cinderella. In early February 2010, Betty has a party in The Rovers Return celebrating both her 90th birthday and the fact that she is the oldest barmaid in Weatherfield; however, it backfires when 91-year-old Enid Crump (June Broughton) crashes the party and claims she is the oldest barmaid, not Betty. Later, Enid becomes sick after Steve serves her a three-month-old hotpot. Betty and Steve are left terrified when they realise that the hotpot could kill Enid, but she later recovers. During the tram crash of December 2010, Betty comforts Claire Peacock (Julia Haworth) after her husband Ashley (Steven Arnold) is tragically crushed to death by the rubble.

Betty is last seen in May 2011, trying in vain to stop David (Jack P. Shepherd) and Kylie Platt (Paula Lane) from coming behind the bar to speak with Becky McDonald (Katherine Kelly). Although Betty is mentioned and referred to by various characters, her subsequent absence was not explained until February 2012, when Audrey asks Stella Price (Michelle Collins) how Betty is, to which Stella replies that Betty is "still a bit under the weather".

On 16 April 2012, Emily and Rita Sullivan (Barbara Knox) arrange to visit a convalescing Betty and go to meet Gordon, who has agreed to drive them there. However, when Gordon does arrive, he brings with him the unexpected news that Betty has died peacefully in her sleep the night before. The residents of the street all gather in The Rovers Return and hold an impromptu memorial for Betty, with all of her old friends reminiscing about her. Gordon, with some persuasion from Emily, decides to have his mother buried in Weatherfield after initially contemplating London. It is later revealed that Annie left The Rovers Return to Betty in her will; however, Betty never acted on this. Gordon assures Stella that he is not interested in the pub and it will remain in her possession. Despite being one of the street's longest serving characters, Betty's funeral was held off-screen. After the wake and lock-up, Stella hangs a photo of Betty on the wall over The Rovers Return, for all to see and remember her. This photo was destroyed during a fire at The Rovers Return in March 2013 started by Karl Munro (John Michie) but, following the refurbishment, Rita managed to obtain an identical copy which remains hanging on the wall in the same place to this day.

=== Personality ===
In his 1998 book The Women of Coronation Street, Daran Little describes Betty as an archetypal mother figure. He compares her to one of Coronation Street's original characters Minnie Caldwell (Margot Bryant), as she is "warm and comforting [...] loves cats and has had her share of lodgers"; however, Little notes that "while Minnie wandered through life in a haze, Betty is sharp-witted, blessed with insight and wisdom". Discussing her evolving characterisation, Little writes: "She hasn't always been the incarnation of lovable joviality: when she arrived in the Street in 1969, she was loud, brash and a vicious-tongued gossip."

Betty's two passions in life are darts and food. Playing darts brings out her competitive side, and she enjoys beating her male customers. Cyril frequently protests when Betty attempts to diet, as he prefers her "homely and comfortable" figure. Ultimately, Betty stops trying to lose weight, stating: "I had to chose [sic?] between losing a few pounds or losing my marital partner. If my Cyril had wanted to marry a skinny rabbit he'd have married one." Betty breaks down when Cyril dies from a heart attack, with Little noting that: "Cyril had been the stabilizing force in Betty's life, and without him she relied heavily on her job and friends at the Rovers – she couldn't face life alone at home". Little has observed that Betty "has a finely tuned sense of right and wrong and has never been afraid to stand up for her beliefs", citing Betty's shock at being mugged in 1982, and calling the NSPCC to report a female neighbour whose children were left outside until nightfall while their mother entertained her boyfriend.

In 2010, Driver discussed her character, saying, "Coronation Street characters tend to fit into one of two camps. Those who have drama after drama and those who muddle through life, often in the background, as sturdy and dependable as the famous cobbles. Betty falls into the latter group. There have been moments of drama, intrigue and even romance – but it has been her presence behind the bar, cutting up pieces of lamb and chunks of potato, that has endeared her to the viewers." When asked about Betty's "sharp tongue", Driver suggested, "Not really sharp. [Betty's] just straightforward. [She's] not nasty to anybody but [she doesn't] suffer fools gladly."

=== Barmaid of The Rovers Return ===
Betty was the longest-serving barmaid of the soap's public house, The Rovers Return. She first served behind the bar in 1969 and had been shown to work there for 42 years, as of 2011. There have been brief breaks however, as storylines have led to the character being fired or quitting her post. She was fired by Annie Walker (Doris Speed), who accused her of theft, and she quit her post in 1995 when Jack (Bill Tarmey) and Vera Duckworth (Liz Dawn) took over as landlords. In the summer of 2009, Betty was sacked again temporarily by manager Poppy Morales. In a storyline that aired in February 2010, Betty – at 90 years old – was named Manchester's Oldest Barmaid. In a plot twist, a 91-year-old rival comes forward, resulting in Betty fearing she killed her, when the rival consumes a two-month-old hotpot.

== Reception ==
ITV described Betty as a "lynchpin" of the soap opera, stating that: "She's as much a part of Coronation Street as the cobble stones." Former executive producer Brian Park suggested in 1997 that characters such as Betty "are essential ingredients. They're like the big clock on the mantelpiece."

The character was one of the longest-serving in British soap, coming third behind Ken Barlow and Emily Bishop in a 1998 survey assessing character episode appearances in Coronation Street's history.

Driver was awarded a lifetime achievement award at The British Soap Awards in May 2010, to honour her role as Betty who had, at that time, featured in Coronation Street for 41 years. Due to illness, Driver was unable to collect the award in person, but she recorded a video message thanking everyone at ITV.

=== Betty's hotpot ===
During her time on Coronation Street, the character became famous for her signature dish at the Rovers Return Inn, Betty's hotpot. ITV have described the dish as "the stuff of legends", and in 1995, pie manufacturer Holland's Pies launched a real-life range of hotpots and pies based on the dish, called "Betty's Kitchen". The idea for the range originated with the firm's marketing director, Dilys Day, who explained: "I was brought up on hotpot and Coronation Street. So when I joined Holland's a year ago, it seemed right to put the two together with Betty's hotpot." Day added that: "We are all very excited about Betty's Kitchen products. Holland's is a strong northern brand, with mass market appeal and wholesome, honest values – the same can be said for The Street." Betty would often drop the letter 'h' when pronouncing the word hotpot to make the dish sound more Northern.

In his book Marketing Communication, Richard J. Varey used the product range as an example of a company capitalising on a form of product placement or "stealth advertising", writing that "Viewers don't realize that they are, in effect, watching an advertisement". Betty Driver said of the range's launch: "Betty Turpin's hotpots have become something of an institution at the Rover's and she's very proud of her reputation for good, wholesome food. I think it is a lovely idea that people will be able to buy them in supermarkets now." Driver discussed her astonishment at the general level of interest in her character's hotpots, disclosing: "I was on a cruise on the QE2 a few weeks ago, and everyone was asking me about it. Then one day, they served hot pot on the menu and everyone thought it was mine!"

In 2007, Liverpool Daily Post editor Larry Neild was selected to join Liverpool's 'Health is Wealth' commission, researching the effects of food deprivation on poor health, after writing a scathing column in which he suggested that the commission's chairman, Sue Woodward, chief executive of ITV Granada, should set a good example in Coronation Street by banning Betty's hotpot. In October of the same year, allegedly the world's biggest Lancashire hotpot was created, based on Betty's traditional hotpot recipe from Coronation Street. The hotpot was cooked in a specially crafted 12 ft by 7 ft tin, weighing 200 kilos. 2008 saw Betty's hotpot come under scrutiny in the soap, after Street resident Jerry Morton suffered a heart attack. Jerry's ex-wife Teresa Bryant blamed the fatty meat in Betty's hotpots for hardening his arteries, and local butcher Ashley Peacock suggested that ostrich meat may be an up-and-coming new alternative, much to Betty's outrage.

== In other media ==
In 1998, a straight to video, Coronation Street spin-off film was released, featuring Betty. It was entitled The Women of Coronation Street and featured clips of the show's most famous females. The video hailed the brief return of Coronation Street favourite Hilda Ogden, who had not been seen in the soap since 1987; Betty travelled to meet her at her new home. A spokesperson for Granada Television commented, "It shows what happens when Betty [Williams] goes up to visit Hilda Ogden at her home in Derbyshire. She used to do cleaning work for a doctor and when he died, he left her the house in gratitude. It'll be a souvenir fans want to keep."
