= Bryan Mosley =

British actor (1931–1999)

- Mosley as Alf Roberts in Coronation Street
- Born: 25 August 1931; Leeds, West Riding of Yorkshire, England
- Died: 9 February 1999 (aged 67); Shipley, West Yorkshire, England
- Other name: Buddy Windrush
- Education: Leeds Central High School
- Occupation: Actor
- Years active: 1960–1999
- Known for: Role of Alf Roberts in Coronation Street (1961–1963, 1967, 1971–1999)
- Spouse: Norma Bowes (m. 1956)
- Children: 6

Bryan Mosley (25 August 1931 – 9 February 1999) was a British actor, best known for his role as grocer Alf Roberts in the long-running ITV soap opera Coronation Street.

== Early life ==
Mosley was born in Leeds, the only child of Agnes Basquill, a print worker, and Jimmy Mosley, a labourer at a dye factory. He attended Leeds Central High School and made his stage debut, aged 10, as the back end of a cow in the pantomime Cinderella. He modelled for clothes catalogues and held a childhood ambition to become a missionary. Instead, aged 13, Mosley won a scholarship to Leeds College of Art, where he studied from 1944 to 1946, and subsequently worked as a commercial artist. He also worked in a bookshop, as a drama teacher and sold encyclopaedias door-to-door.

In 1950, Mosley's father, a smoker and heavy drinker, died from a heart attack. His mother subsequently remarried, a marriage which Mosley did not approve of, and he remained estranged from her until her death.

In 1952, after national service in the RAF, working in air traffic control just outside Newcastle and in Scotland, Mosley trained as an actor at the Bradford Civic Theatre and Esme Church's Northern Theatre School. He then toured with the New Pilgrim Players, playing in churches, abbeys, pubs and prisons, before working in repertory theatre in York, Perth, Derby and Harrogate.

== Coronation Street ==
Mosley joined the cast of Coronation Street in February 1961 (episode 18), and made recurrent appearances until 1963, as Post Office worker Alfred "Alf" Roberts, a colleague of Frank Barlow. He returned to the series briefly in 1967, before re-joining as a regular cast member in 1971. Alf became best known as the owner of the Corner Shop, local councillor and twice Mayor of Weatherfield in 1973 and 1994. His character was married three times: initially to Phyllis Plant (1946–1972), who did not appear onscreen; secondly to Renee Bradshaw (1978–1980); and latterly to Audrey Roberts, from 1985 until Mosley's departure in 1999.

Mosley's appearances in the soap opera became less frequent following a serious heart attack in 1997, causing him to take eight months off from the show. After 37 years, and almost 2,000 episodes, his character was to be written out of the serial. Mosley, upset at the prospect of his character's demise, refused to act out his final dying scene, until Granada bosses offered him ten times his usual rate to play the scene. Alf Roberts made his last appearance on New Year's Day 1999, dying peacefully on screen in his sleep, watched by more than 18 million viewers. He received a standing ovation from the cast on set. Mosley recorded his final scenes on 4 December 1998, and died just over nine weeks later from a heart attack.

Mosley also appeared with the Coronation Street cast in the 1989 Royal Variety Performance, and a 1990 London Weekend Television special, Happy Birthday, Coronation Street!, hosted by Cilla Black celebrating 30 years of the soap.

== Other roles ==
Mosley made his screen debut in the film A Kind of Loving (1962). He also appeared in Get Carter (1971) playing local gangster Cliff Brumby. He is famously killed by Jack Carter (Michael Caine), who beats him up and throws him from the roof of the Trinity Square multi-storey car park in Gateshead, after discovering Brumby's involvement in his brother's death. He played alien dignitary Malpha and a Prop Man on a film set in the Doctor Who serial The Daleks' Master Plan in 1965 and made two appearances in The Avengers. Mosley also had small roles in Z Cars, Crossroads, A Family at War and as the pub landlord in Queenie's Castle.

Mosley performed alongside Arthur Haynes, Harry Worth and Dick Emery in their television shows. In addition, he appeared in commercials for Watney's, alongside Morecambe and Wise, in an advertisement for Albert's Crisps, as well as using his stunt skills to swing from a huge chandelier, sword in hand, in an unscreened advertisement for a cereal.

In October 1997, he was the subject of This is Your Life, being surprised by Michael Aspel on the set of Coronation Street. The episode was broadcast on 3 November. Tributes were paid by actor Paul Shane and actress Kathy Staff. He was joined by the cast of Coronation Street.

== Fight arranger ==
While performing in repertory theatre, Mosley used the fencing skills he learned in the RAF to direct the fights in a production of Othello, in Perth, and at the Theatre Royal, York, for Henry IV. He fenced with Terence Stamp in the film Far from the Madding Crowd, and taught fencing in schools around Leeds.

Mosely was also a fight director, and coached Robert Hardy, Tom Courtenay and Neil Diamond, who needed to look like a fencer for a photo-session. He was a founder member of the Society of British Fight Directors, intended to regulate fighting on stage and screen, and he arranged the Get Carter fight with Caine. He also endowed a fencing award at the Royal Academy of Dramatic Art. Mosley was sometimes credited as Buddy Windrush.

== Personal life and death ==
Mosley married schoolteacher and childhood sweetheart Norma Bowes in Leeds, on 25 July 1956. The couple first met in the early 1940s whilst they both attended a local youth club, at the Belle Vue Methodist Church, and after an engagement of four years, the pair remained married until Mosley's death. They had six children between 1957 and 1966: three sons (Jonathan, Bernard and Leonard) and three daughters (Jacqueline, Simone and Helen). The family lived in Nab Wood, near Shipley, West Yorkshire.

Mosley was a practising Roman Catholic who had made at least one pilgrimage to Lourdes. He was awarded an honorary degree from the University of Bradford. Mosley was a keen painter and trained at the Leeds College of Art. He was an honorary member of the British Watercolours Society, Ilkley, where he regularly exhibited his work. Mosley also wrote a regular column for The Weekly News.

In later life he began to suffer from cardiac troubles, and suffered his first heart attack in 1991. After a second more serious heart attack in 1997, he lost four stone in weight. In addition, Mosley had respiratory problems, and was told by producers of Coronation Street to leave the programme, ultimately leading him to give up his role as Alf Roberts.

On 9 February 1999, Mosley collapsed in the street outside the Market Hall, Westgate, near his home in Shipley. His wife was by his side and he was immediately taken to Bradford Royal Infirmary, but died on arrival from a heart attack, aged 67. His funeral took place a week later, on 16 February 1999, at St Mary and St Walburga Church, Shipley, attended by relatives and close friends, including Eileen Derbyshire. Following the private ceremony, Mosley was cremated at Nab Wood Crematorium, Shipley, with his Coronation Street character's trademark trilby laid on his coffin; a brass band played "For All the Saints". His widow, Norma, asked fans to light a candle in the window of their homes in tribute, stating: "Although the ceremony is a private event, people can join us in spirit and place a lighted candle for Bryan in their window."

A public memorial service was later held at Salford Cathedral, attended by more than 300 people, with members of the Coronation Street cast and the show's creator Tony Warren paying tribute. In respect, filming schedules were rearranged by Granada Television to enable cast members to attend.

Norma died on 16 October 2011, aged 79.

== Legacy ==
In 1999, a biography, Street Life: The Bryan Mosley Story, by Chris Gidney, was published.

As part of the Coronation Street 40th anniversary celebrations in 2000, heritage plaques were unveiled outside the Granada Studios to four of the soap opera's stars, including Mosley. The other plaques commemorated the lives of Doris Speed, Pat Phoenix and Violet Carson.

In 2010, as part of the show's 50th anniversary celebrations, Alf Roberts featured in a video countdown, The Stars of the Street: 50 Years, 50 Classic Characters.

== Filmography ==
Year	Title	Role	Notes
1962	A Kind of Loving	Bus Conductor	Uncredited
1963	This Sporting Life	Man in bar	Uncredited
1963	Billy Liar	Bit Part	Uncredited
1964	Rattle of a Simple Man	Coach Organiser	Uncredited
1965	Carry On Cowboy	Rider	Uncredited
1965	Up Jumped a Swagman	Jo-Jo	
1966	Where the Bullets Fly	Connolly	
1967	Far from the Madding Crowd	Barker	
1968	Charlie Bubbles	Herbert	
1970	Spring and Port Wine		
1971	Get Carter	Cliff Brumby	
