= Bill Podmore =

British television producer

- Born: Edgar William Podmore; 15 August 1931; Gainsborough, Lincolnshire, England
- Died: 22 January 1994 (aged 62); Cheadle, Greater Manchester, England
- Occupation: TV producer
- Years active: 1967–1989
- Spouse: Gillian Podmore (separated)
- Partner: Millie Preece
- Children: 2

Edgar William Podmore (15 August 1931 – 22 January 1994) was a British television producer, he is best remembered for his long association with the soap opera Coronation Street, a series he produced for twelve years (1976–1988).

== Biography ==
Podmore was born in Gainsborough, Lincolnshire and initially served as a Royal Air Force pilot, he became a TV cameraman for the BBC, shortly after with Granada Television and later, a director. When, as a relatively young man, he was called upon to direct an episode of Coronation Street, Violet Carson (Ena Sharples) with a massive twinkle in her eye, drew herself up to her full height and confronted him - "Hello Bill, welcome...my train leaves at 5.30 p.m.!"

Podmore was asked to take over as producer of "the Street" in 1976. Initially he turned the offer down flat. As former Street writer John Stevenson recalled in a BBC Radio 2 documentary, "Coronation Street was on a downward slope at the time. No-one wanted to work on it, the quality of the scripts had dropped, the storylines were poor and it was becoming something of a joke within the TV industry to have to work on it".

Podmore helped steer the programme back onto an even keel. He referred to this as "re-decoration, not demolition" meaning that he intended to capitalise on the strengths he already had there. Thus the Ogdens became a comedic double act yet again, and Eddie Yeats, who before Podmore's stewardship had been nothing more than a petty thug, became the Ogdens' surrogate son and was revealed to have a heart of gold. Podmore brought in new characters, such as Renee Bradshaw, and brought minor characters, such as Fred Gee and Vera Duckworth, to the fore.

However, it was not all plain sailing. In the early 1980s, Peter Dudley was arrested in a Manchester public lavatory for importuning. Podmore stood by Dudley steadfastly, insisting that although he was involved in a "shameful" court case in reality, whatever Dudley did in his private life was his own business. Dudley later suffered a stroke caused by the stress of the case, and finally suffered a fatal heart attack after asking to be "written-out" of the show.

Podmore though was no easy touch. The cast referred to him as "the Godfather" for he could be very ruthless. In 1980, he killed Madge Hindle's character Renee Roberts off as he deemed her marriage to Alf Roberts was "not working". Podmore was quoted as saying that Alf Roberts was allowed to emerge "from the shadows of a rather humdrum marriage". When Stephen Hancock refused to sign a new contract in protest at the cast wages system, Podmore had his character Ernest Bishop killed off, having him shot dead in a bungled wages snatch at Mike Baldwin's factory.

Podmore also sacked Peter Adamson who played Len Fairclough. Adamson had been suspended from the programme after previously selling stories about cast members and calling some of them talentless amateurs. After allegations were made that he had indecently assaulted two young girls at a Haslingden swimming pool in April 1983, he was written out until he cleared his name. Faced with high legal fees, Adamson sold his story to The Sun and the News of the World without permission. Podmore called this "indefensible" and sacked him in August 1983.

Podmore left the series in early 1989.

His memoirs, entitled Coronation Street - The Inside Story, were published in 1990.

== Death ==
Podmore died on 22 January 1994 at Cheadle Royal Hospital in Greater Manchester.
