= Len Fairclough =

Fictional character from Coronation Street

- Coronation Street character
- Portrayed by: Peter Adamson
- Duration: 1961–1983
- First appearance: 25 January 1961; Episode 14
- Last appearance: 11 May 1983; Episode 2307
- Introduced by: Stuart Latham
In-universe information
- Other names: Leonard Franklin Fairclough
- Occupation: Businessman; Builder; Councillor; Shopkeeper
- Father: Ned Fairclough
- Mother: Grace Fairclough
- Wife: Nellie Briggs (until 1963); Rita Littlewood (1977–1983)
- Sons: Stanley Fairclough
- Adoptive daughters: Sharon Gaskell (foster)
- Aunts: Edna

Len Fairclough is a fictional character from the British ITV soap opera Coronation Street, played by Peter Adamson between his introduction in 1961 and the character's axing in 1983.

== Creation and casting ==
Adamson was a former extra and theatre actor who had turned to TV drama with the Granada series Skyport and Knight Errant. When casting began for the new TV serial Florizel Street, Adamson auditioned for the parts of Dennis Tanner (later Philip Lowrie) and Ken Barlow (later William Roache); however, at thirty he was considered too old for either part and instead he was cast as insurance man Harry Bailey. Adamson was one of several actors cast for the dry runs who did not appear on screen; when the series was commissioned, further casting and rewrites took place, and Harry Bailey was dropped from the episode (the character later appeared in Episode 5, renamed Ron Bailey and played by Ray Mort).

When the series was extended beyond its initial run, Adamson tried again, auditioning for the part of Harry Hewitt's (Ivan Beavis) drinking buddy by the name of Len Fairclough. He secured the part and made his on-screen debut in Episode 14 on 25 January 1961. Despite a sketchy character brief, Len's role grew, and with the departure of Ivan Beavis from the cast in 1964 Len took over as the programme's leading alpha male. Then-script editor H.V. Kershaw credited this to Adamson's skill as an actor: "The character of Len Fairclough was formed in the first few weeks or Coronation Street mainly as a social partner for Harry Hewitt who had been a central character since the second episode. So assertively was the character played by Peter Adamson that it rapidly achieved an importance of its own and by the beginning of 1964 the character led the male defence against the monstrous battalions of the Street's women." Bill Podmore, producer throughout the 1970s, said "Peter had a great rugged quality, the right face and exactly the right build. His toughness only gave more weight to his acting skills. Off the set he could be as abrasive as the man he played, it was an underlying part of his nature which he passed on to Len. He turned him into a wonderfully earthy character who didn't mince words but was never unattractive to the legions of fans." An early sign of the character's success was that Adamson was the only non-original cast member contracted for the duration of the Equity actors' strike between November 1961 and April 1962. As noted in Life in the Street (Graeme Kay, 1991), the public reaction to the character varied from demands by viewers to drop the "loud-mouthed, hard-drinking bully", to male viewers offering Adamson a fight to "find out how tough he really was".

== Development ==
When he first appeared in the serial, Len was characterized as a neglectful husband and father, although his wife Nellie never appeared on-screen. For many years, Len was the programme's central male character, appearing in more episodes than anyone else in 1962, 1965, 1966 and 1972. A key element of the character was his relationship with Elsie Tanner. Despite a mutual attraction between the pair, the writers never allowed Len and Elsie to get together, as writer Adele Rose explains: "The value of their relationship was always in the spikiness underneath the genuine affection they had for each other. It was far more profitable in terms of story and character to keep them with the love-hate relationship going on. He was the one who could say things to her that nobody else could and vice versa. If we ever brought it to any kind of conclusion, that would have been the end of both the characters' value to the show."

Len was the first character to swear in Coronation Street. As recalls Kershaw: "Coronation Street resisted the use of the word 'bloody' until Episode 190 when Len Fairclough, suffering under the stress of the kidnapping of his friend's baby, used the word to Emily Nugent (Eileen Derbyshire) and immediately apologised. Those days have gone forever."

The other woman in Len's life was Rita Tanner. The character of Rita, initially named Rita Bates, was specifically devised as a love interest for Len, although when Barbara Knox was cast the character was linked with her prior one-episode role from 1964. Five years later, producer Bill Podmore decided that they would finally tie the knot. He was surprised to be met with opposition from the actors: "Peter and Barbara argued that a wedding could be the beginning of the end for their characters. Len and Rita were cornerstones of the Street, and they imagined that a marriage could chip the bedrock away. Their individual independence within the programme would disappear first and that, they feared, would be swiftly followed by a watering down of their storylines. Frankly, they didn't want to share." The wedding was watched by 16.90 million viewers - the programme's highest audience figure of the decade - and the TV Times celebrated with a wedding souvenir magazine.

=== Adamson's behaviour ===
The character was absent between October and December 1969, as Peter Adamson was suspended for two months without pay to deal with his alcoholism. H.V. Kershaw made the decision after Adamson was so inebriated during the recording of a scene that, for the first time in the programme's history not due to a technical problem, the scene had to be remounted the following week so that close-ups could be shot which were then edited into the previous week's footage.

Adamson's drinking had been a continuing problem behind the scenes. Bill Podmore, who directed the episode in question, says: "Peter had been pretty tipsy on set many times before but we had always got away with it and I don't think a single viewer ever suspected. If they did, they let it pass. Harry Kershaw was not prepared to be so generous this time. For him it was the last straw." Kershaw: "Peter Adamson's drunkenness hung around like an albatross around the programme's neck and my responsibilities as producer were beginning to weigh very heavily indeed ... At each story conference during this period we would include the character in our projected plots, hoping that Peter Adamson's problem would miraculously disappear. This was wishful thinking at its most stupid and it rapidly became evident as matters grew worse that drastic action needed to be taken." On Adamson's reaction to his suspension, "His immediate reaction, as I recall it, was to call me a crafty bastard ... He had always banked on Granada's reluctance to tear up three months of planning and get rid of him. The cunning which leads alcoholics to hide their bottles in inaccessible places had led him to believe that his financial future at least was secure and the shattering of this belief was in fact the first step towards his recovery." Kershaw wrongly claims that the suspension occurred in 1964) According to Kershaw and Podmore, Adamson beat the bottle at the first attempt.

=== Departure ===
Len's last appearance before Adamson's leave of absence in Episode 2307 stood as the character's swansong, and seven months later he was killed off, dying off-screen in a motorway collision while returning home from his hitherto secret mistress Marjorie Proctor. "Of course the public saw this as another twist of the knife," said Bill Podmore, "and Peter traded on their sympathy. He had been a professional actor long enough to realise that if a character of Len's fame was to be killed off, the sacrifice would only be made with the help of the most dramatic storyline possible. Instead he chose to believe that Coronation Street had taken revenge for his shame." Writers John Stevenson and Adele Rose back up Podmore's claim that Len cheating on Rita was motivated only by the objective of maximum drama.

== Storylines ==
Len was born in Liverpool on 5 November 1924. His parents were killed in the Blitz, which prompted Len to join the Merchant Navy. After de-mob, he goes to Weatherfield, where he marries Nellie and has a son named Stanley (played by Peter Noone, later of the British pop group Herman's Hermits). Their marriage was not a happy one and, on 22 November 1963, Nellie tells him she wants a divorce. Nellie later dies of cancer and Stanley never forgives his father for how he had treated her, as the two never reconciled.

A builder by profession, owning his own yard, Len also spends many years working as an Independent councillor for Weatherfield. Len's idea of a real woman is his next-door neighbour, Elsie Tanner (Patricia Phoenix): attractive, sexy, with a ribald sense of humour. However, she is more of a friend than a lover, and whenever Len suggests that their relationship should go to the next level, Elsie always refuses, not wanting to spoil the special bond they have. When Elsie remarries, to a handsome G.I., Master Sergeant Steve Tanner (Paul Maxwell), Len was beomces consumed with jealousy, to such an extent that when Steve is found dead under suspicious circumstances, Len is accused of murdering him.

Len had eventually reconciles himself to being on his own for the rest of his life, but he then meets Rita Bates (Barbara Knox), who earns her living as a cabaret singer in the rather downmarket Gatsby Club. Although she claims she was married to Harry Bates (William Simons), they are in fact only a common-law couple, and her name was actually Rita Littlewood. Rita has a lot in common with Elsie, also feisty, independent, and never afraid to stand up to Len, which is what he desires in a woman. Elsie is initially very cool towards Rita, but they become firm friends over time. After a rocky courtship, Len and Rita marry and honeymoon in Tenerife, where Rita secures herself a singing job.

After a while, Rita starts to feel frustrated by Len and his lack of motivation. Feeling he is taking her for granted, Rita leaves him, breaking Len to pieces. Once she agrees to return, the couple attempt to adopt a child, but were told they were too old to do so. Instead, they foster, first a boy called John, then, on a more long-term basis, Sharon Gaskell (Tracie Bennett). Len is amused that Sharon prefers woodwork to needlework and that she likes playing football, which causes an instant bond between them, much to Rita's delight. Sharon becomes the Faircloughs' surrogate daughter, and Len is proud of her. When he comes home unexpectedly one night and finds a boy in the house trying to entice Sharon upstairs, Len threatened to hit him. Rita is angry, believing that Len had mishandled the situation, but he is able to say from the heart that he had only done it because he cared about Sharon. Eventually, Sharon moves away, after getting a job as a kennel maid in Sheffield.

Rita's world comes crashing down when Len falls asleep at the wheel of his van and collided with a motorway bridge, the impact instantly killing him. Rita, devastated, is comforted when Sharon comes back from Sheffield to attend the funeral. Rita later discovers, however, that Len had been having an affair with a woman in Bolton before his death. As a result, her memories of Len remain bittersweet. When Rita subsequently begins a relationship with Alan Bradley (Mark Eden), Alan steals evidence of Len's identity and pretends to be him in order to obtain a loan to support his own business. It was Rita's discovery of the deception that causes her violent final breakup with Alan.
