= Betty Driver =

British actress and singer (1920–2011)

Betty Driver MBE
- Driver on the set of Coronation Street
- Born: Elizabeth Mary Driver; 20 May 1920; Leicester, England
- Died: 15 October 2011 (aged 91); Cheadle, England
- Occupations: Actress; singer
- Years active: 1928–2011
- Spouse: Wally Petersen (m. 1952; div. 1970)

Elizabeth (Betty) Mary Driver (20 May 1920 – 15 October 2011) was a British actress and singer, best known for her role as Betty Williams in the long-running ITV soap opera Coronation Street, a role she played for 42 years from 1969 to 2011, appearing in 2,732 episodes. She had previously appeared as Mrs Edgley in Coronation Street spin-off Pardon the Expression (1965–1966) opposite Arthur Lowe. In her early career Driver was a singer, appearing in musical films such as Boots! Boots! (1934), opposite George Formby, and in Penny Paradise (1938), directed by Carol Reed. She was made an MBE in the 2000 New Year Honours.

== Early life ==
Elizabeth Mary Driver was born on 20 May 1920 at the Prebend Nursing Home, Leicester, the elder of two daughters of Frederick and Nellie Driver. She weighed 5.5 kg (12 lb). Her father had fought in the trenches during the First World War and later became a policeman. However, Driver described her mother as "the driving force" in her life. She commented: "the only way I can explain her behaviour is that she wanted to live out her ambitions through me."

The family moved to West Didsbury, Manchester, shortly after the birth. They were recorded as living there in the June 1921 census, where they lived in a semi-detached house with other police families as neighbours. Driver went to school at Wilbraham Road, and was later joined there by her younger sister Freda, who shared a class with a young Patricia Manfield, later known as Pat Phoenix, the actress who went on to play the role of Elsie Tanner in Coronation Street, alongside Driver.

Driver described her parents as absent of affection, stating that they never celebrated birthdays and rarely gave her toys and gifts. Though she maintained her father never beat them, their mother "more often lashed out". Driver's mother had never wanted children, and developed an interest in her daughter only when she discovered she had a talent for singing. When she was aged seven, the Drivers went to see a production called the Quaintesques, a group of men dressed as women, when the star, Billy Manders, asked the audience to join in with a chorus. Driver's singing stood out so much that Manders asked her to come forward and sing with him. From then on, Driver's mother began taking her to talent contests in Manchester, and she won them all. She commented, "I imitated hits by Gracie Fields such as 'Sing As We Go', and 'The Biggest Aspidistra in the World', corny little numbers that I detested but mother adored ... I think she was a frustrated performer herself and she was determined that my sister Freda and I were going to fulfil all her dreams."

== Career ==
At the age of eight, Driver began performing professionally, forced by her mother to appear with Terence Byron Repertory Theatre Company. She was singing for the BBC by the age of 10, and began touring across the UK in her first revue at the age of 12. While performing in London at the age of 14, Driver was spotted by the agent Bert Aza, who was in partnership with his brother Archie Pitt, Gracie Fields' husband. Despite her young age, he booked her for the lead in a revival of Mr Tower of London (alongside comedian Norman Evans) which ran for about two years. The same show had brought Gracie Fields to prominence 19 years earlier. Driver was also approached by George Formby after he and his wife Beryl saw her perform in Manchester. The Formbys wanted Driver to appear in their new film, Boots! Boots! (1934); however, according to Driver, Beryl Formby saw her rehearsing and decided that she did not want to be outperformed by Driver, and sent her away. The producers felt so bad about the way Driver had been treated that they refused to take her name off the film credits, even though it was long thought she did not appear in the theatrical release. It is now known that she did perform in the film, and her scene was included in the original release. In 1938, an edited version of the film was released which did not include her scene. A restored version of the film (including Driver's scene) has been released on DVD, which finally confirms her involvement in the film.

At 16, she was in a West End show called Home and Beauty. Film director Basil Dean, after seeing her in Jimmy Hunter's Brighton Follies, cast her in the film Penny Paradise (1938), filmed at ATP studios in Ealing. After a few months of variety and radio work, she returned to the studio to make her second film, Let's Be Famous. They had just completed the film when the Second World War broke out and the studios were closed. Nineteen at the time, Driver resumed touring the country in variety shows. It was at this time that her act and image altered. Against her mother's wishes, Driver and her sister modernised her performance and Driver became a ballad singer. Shortly after, during a six-month run in a revue called Twice in a Blue Moon, Driver and her sister parted company with their mother following a cardiac asthma attack which restricted her mobility.

Driver continued in variety, opening in the Coventry Hippodrome and sharing the bill with the Andrews family - stepfather Ted, mother Barbara and Julie. She made regular trips to Bristol to sing on a radio show called Ack Ack Beer Beer and made her final film in 1941, Facing the Music.

In the 1940s, she became a singer with British dance bands. During the Second World War, Driver travelled with ENSA (Entertainments National Service Association), entertaining the troops. She also appeared for seven years on the radio show Henry Hall's Guest Night and on her own show, A Date with Betty, which was broadcast live from the People's Palace in London's East End on 14 July 1949. The show's format was based around Driver singing, doing sketches and introducing guests. All her words were scripted by Bob Monkhouse, then barely out of his teens. She recorded many popular tunes in the 1940s and became an established singer during this time. Aged 14, she made her first record "Jubilee Baby", had another major success with "The Sailor with the Navy Blue Eyes", and made several more hit records.

Driver travelled to Australia, where she performed her own show, and her career also took her to Cyprus, Malta and the Middle East. On her return to England she appeared on stage in The Lovebirds, Pillar to Post and What A Racket, and on television with James Bolam in Love on the Dole.

In 1964, she auditioned for the role of Hilda Ogden in the television series Coronation Street (the role went instead to Jean Alexander, for the casting directors wanted an actress of slighter build). Driver was cast later, alongside Arthur Lowe, in the series Pardon the Expression, a spin-off of Coronation Street. She described Lowe as "such a difficult man to work with"; after a much-publicised injury (she damaged her back after the script called for her to throw Lowe), she retired and began running a pub, the Cock Hotel in Whaley Bridge, Derbyshire, with her sister Freda.

In 1969, she was persuaded to come out of retirement to play police officer's wife Betty Turpin in Coronation Street, a role she would play for over 40 years. She was the longest-serving barmaid in the history of the Rover's Return, and Betty's Hot Pot (served at lunchtime in the Rovers) is an iconic dish, which has also been offered as a ready meal in UK supermarkets.

She was the subject of This Is Your Life in 1976, when she was surprised by Eamonn Andrews.

In 1994, she was the subject of BBC Radio 2's The Betty Driver Story. It was researched and scripted by Stephen Bourne, who interviewed Driver and her sister Freda for the programme. Other interviewees included William Roache and Julie Goodyear. It was presented by Cilla Black.

Driver wrote a memoir about her years on stage, radio, film and television, titled Betty, which was published in 2000. In an interview on the Parkinson show on 11 November 2006, Sir Ian McKellen revealed that Driver still drove herself into work at 7:30 each morning, despite her age. She was made a Member of the Order of the British Empire (MBE) by Queen Elizabeth II in the 2000 New Year Honours.

In August 2008, it was announced that Driver was one of several Coronation Street stars who faced large salary cuts. She was reportedly admitted to hospital with a chest infection in April 2010. In May 2010, she was awarded the Lifetime Achievement Award at the British Soap Awards. There were also rumours that she was to retire; however, these were confirmed as false. Driver vowed in September 2010 never to retire, stating that: "If I retire, I'll be dead in six months with boredom" and stated she still "loved" being part of Coronation Street.

On 23 January 2011, she was the castaway on BBC Radio 4's Desert Island Discs.

== Personal life ==
Driver said she fell in love several times in her teenage years, but each relationship was ruined by her mother, who wanted to keep her daughter single so as not to lose her free "meal ticket". All the earnings Driver made before she turned 21 and was in charge of her own finances were squandered by her parents.

Driver stated that she was bitter about the path chosen for herself and her sister: "I never wanted to be in the theatre and we really resented missing out on our childhood. Birthdays and Christmases were ignored and we never saw a pay-cheque. My pushy mother stuck to us like a wart and we were rarely out of her sight." Her mother died of lung cancer in 1956 after a long illness.

In December 1952, at Burnt Oak Registry Office in London, she married South African singer Wally Petersen, something Driver claimed she did out of "defiance" of her domineering mother, who she has said "always felt Wally was only interested in my bank account". Petersen had appeared as part of a double-act on The Betty Driver Show in 1949, where they met and fell in love. Driver reluctantly agreed to marry him. She commented, "Before the wedding, he had started to change the way I looked and sang. Up to this point, I'd always worn glamorous gowns. Wally said that look was too dated. He wanted me in short knee-length wide skirts, which I loathed. I went along with it because I loved him. Wally said my act was corny and old-fashioned. I became very cowed and did as he said, as I had with Mother. We toured with this new look and singing style, but audiences were lukewarm".

Driver became pregnant with Petersen's child, but suffered a miscarriage. Doctors then discovered she had fibroids in her womb and insisted on a hysterectomy. The couple considered adoption, but were turned down. They lived in Finchley, North London, where Vera Lynn was a neighbour and acquaintance of Driver's. The couple later moved to St Albans in Hertfordshire.

Lew Levisohn, the husband of Driver's good friend Winifred Atwell, once told Driver that he had punched Petersen after discovering an affair Petersen was having. Driver responded by saying "Good". Driver and her husband moved to South Africa, but she returned a few months later, penniless, ending the marriage after seven years because of her husband's various infidelities. She was in such a bad financial state that her sister had to send her money to allow her to return home to the United Kingdom.

Although the couple separated after six years, in October 1959, they were legally married until 1970. On 11 March 1970, Driver was awarded a decree nisi in an undefended lawsuit at Salford Divorce Court. She alleged desertion against her husband, and he was ordered by the judge to pay the costs of the lawsuit.

Following the breakup of her marriage, Driver lived with and cared for her sister Freda until Freda's death in December 2008. The sisters lived in Mellor, Stockport, before moving to Hale Barns in Greater Manchester. They latterly lived in nearby Bowdon.

Driver was godmother to James Roache, the youngest son of William Roache, who plays Ken Barlow in Coronation Street. Roache's son James had a role in Coronation Street as Ken's long-lost grandson, James Cunningham.

Despite Driver's character being well known for her Lancashire hotpot, Driver was a vegetarian who seldom cooked, claiming she "couldn't cook a hotpot to save [her] life".

=== Death ===
Driver died on 15 October 2011, aged 91.

== Filmography ==
- Boots! Boots! (1934)
- Penny Paradise (1938)
- Let's Be Famous (1939)
- Facing the Music (1941)
- Rooftop Rendezvous (1949–1950)
- The Betty Driver Show (6 episodes, 1952)
- Television Christmas Party (1952)
- Pardon the Expression (31 episodes, 1965–66)
- Love on the Dole (1967)
- Coronation Street (1969–2011) – Betty Williams (2,732 episodes)

== Awards and nominations ==
Year	Award	Category	Nominated work	Result	Ref.
1987	BASCA	Gold Badge of Merit	Herself	Won	
2010	British Soap Awards	Outstanding Achievement	Coronation Street	Won	
2012	TRIC Awards	TV Soap Personality	Coronation Street	Won	
