= Peter Adamson (actor) =

English actor (1930–2002)

- Born: Peter George Adamson; 16 February 1930; Liverpool, England
- Died: 17 January 2002 (aged 71); Lincoln, England
- Education: London Academy of Music and Dramatic Art
- Occupation: Actor
- Years active: 1956–1989
- Spouse: Jean Duncan (m. 1953; died 1984)
- Children: 2

Peter George Adamson (16 February 1930 – 17 January 2002) was an English actor, best known for playing Len Fairclough in TV series Coronation Street from January 1961 to May 1983.

== Early life ==
Peter George Adamson was born on 16 February 1930 at 54 Hannan Road in Kensington, Liverpool, the youngest of six children.

His father was a manager of a menswear shop. Adamson was evacuated to Wales with his older brother when World War II broke out. He left school at the age of 14 and took an office job in a solicitor's firm, before trying for a career as a commercial artist.

== Career ==
=== Early career and Coronation Street ===
Adamson took part in a community play at the age of 17, and moved to London and attended LAMDA, but left after two months. He returned to the north-west, working for several years in repertory theatre, where he met his wife Jean. He set up his own rep theatre company, producing and performing in plays and summer shows at Weston-super-Mare. He appeared in London's West End, and first appeared on television in 1956 in a variety show. He then gained roles in television dramas such as Granada Television's Skyport and Knight Errant Limited before being cast as Len Fairclough in Granada's fledgling soap opera Coronation Street. His character first appeared on screen in January 1961.

In September 1970, Adamson took two months away from Coronation Street to play Mr Fenn in the Emlyn Williams play Someone's Waiting. He was in New Zealand from November to December 1972, playing Gus in Harold Pinter's play The Dumb Waiter. In 1973, he appeared in the play Nightfall.

=== First suspension ===
Off screen, Adamson gained a reputation as a hell-raiser, admitting he had a drink problem and had become involved in pub brawls. On 7 November 1966, he was fined £30 and banned from driving for a year after being arrested for drunk driving.

He stopped drinking alcohol in July 1969 after being suspended from the show unpaid, and spent several weeks in Rossendale General Hospital in the Rossendale Valley, drying out. Adamson was missing from episodes 921 to 935. After discharge, he attended Alcoholics Anonymous and remained sober for 15 years but started consuming alcohol again after his wife's death.

== 1983 ==
In February 1983, Adamson sold behind-the-scenes stories about his Coronation Street co-stars to The Sun newspaper journalist Dan Slater, calling some actors "amateurs". The articles were branded "Len Lets Rip". He said Anne Kirkbride was "Propping too much time up at the bar" and "I wish she would leave the street, although I would miss her terribly. But for her own good she should go because she's been here for far too long. She's a great actress loaded with talent but plays the part of a dull housewife. I call her a lazy moo". Adamson said off-screen he did not get on at all with Barbara Knox, who played his screen wife Rita. Adamson added that Doris Speed was "a great actress" but was "going deaf" and Cheryl Murray, who played Suzy Birchall, "was too full of herself for my liking".

He was given a warning by producer Bill Podmore and management at Granada that he would be dismissed for breach of contract if it ever happened again. Adamson was told he would be suspended from the programme for six weeks without pay in April 1983. The suspension was due to take place in June and July 1983.

=== Allegations of indecent assault ===
On 24 April 1983, a Sunday newspaper reported Adamson had been arrested the previous day on suspicion of two incidents of indecent assault on two eight-year-old girls at a public swimming pool in Haslingden, where he had assisted as a part-time instructor. One was allegedly assaulted the previous day and the other on 16 April. The police complaint alleged Adamson's hands had strayed while he was giving swimming lessons.

His final appearance as Len Fairclough was broadcast on 11 May, but it had been recorded in late March, before his arrest and suspension. Adamson asked Granada to write him out of the programme until his court case was over. His trial began on 18 July 1983 and he was represented by barrister George Carman QC, who had a prominent career representing celebrities. On 26 July, at Burnley Crown Court, a jury found Adamson not guilty.

In June 1988, he was allegedly persuaded by freelance Sun reporter Dan Slater to change his story following several bottles of whisky. Adamson was alleged to have told Slater: "I am totally guilty of everything the police said"...."But what I hope you will print - there was no sexual intent." This appeared in The Sun on 6 and 7 June 1988. As a result, Lincolnshire Police interviewed Adamson, who denied the confession. Slater claimed he had "mislaid" the tapes of the interview and the police took no further action.

=== Sacking ===
After he was charged, Adamson was refused legal aid. Two weeks before the trial began, he approached Granada to see if they would help with a potentially large legal bill. Granada prepared to loan Adamson £10,000, but he admitted to Podmore and Granada management that he had signed an unauthorised contract to sell his memoirs to The Sun and News of the World, along with the story of his arrest and trial, which had left Adamson with legal bills of £120,000. Podmore called this "indefensible" and withdrew the loan. Adamson was sacked by Podmore in a letter sent to his house whilst he was on holiday in Bali on 25 August 1983. The letter stated Granada would not renew Adamson's contract, which expired in November 1983, and that he would be paid up to then.

At the time of his sacking, Adamson was earning a reported £25,000 a year. In 1974, he had been earning £12,000 a year.

On 12 September 1983, Podmore and Mervyn Watson made the decision to kill off the Len Fairclough character; and he was killed off-screen in a motorway crash on 7 December 1983. To demonise the character, it was revealed he had been returning home from an affair, cheating on his wife Rita. Adamson claimed this was motivated by sheer spite on Granada's part, to turn viewers against Len.

Adamson celebrated the character's death by delivering an obituary on TV-am dressed as an undertaker, and delivered a bitter parting shot towards both Coronation Street and Granada in a poem he wrote.

On 30 July 1985, Adamson spoke about the trial and its aftermath in a TVS programme called Regrets. Granada refused to air the episode due to Adamson's criticism of Granada following his dismissal. They threatened TVS with legal action for using the Coronation Street theme and photographs from the series.

=== Work after Coronation Street ===
Post-Coronation Street, Adamson starred as Inspector Hubbard in a West End production of Dial M for Murder at the Vaudeville Theatre from November 1983 to March 1984 which also featured Simon Ward and Hayley Mills. The play was successful. In June 1984, Adamson was in a play in Croydon, and in summer 1984 he read short stories on BBC Radio 4. He was in a play in Harlow, Essex, when his wife fell seriously ill in September 1984 and he had to quit to return north. In February and March 1985, Adamson was based in Cambridge, where he had a part in Entertaining Mr Sloane, and in spring and early summer 1985 he was in Darlington playing Tommy Beamish, the leading role of an actor-manager of a troupe of music-hall entertainers on the eve of the First World War, in J. B. Priestley's Empires.

In 1986, he was in a touring production of A Taste of Honey. Later that year, Adamson briefly settled in Canada, appearing in weekly repertory in Toronto and Vancouver. He appeared in Run for Your Wife, a Ray Cooney farce at the Bayview Playhouse in the former city. He returned to the UK in the spring of 1988 and played Sir Tunbelly Clumsy in a revival of The Relapse at the Mermaid Theatre from September to December that year. From February to April 1989, Adamson starred in the play Comedians in Belfast. Acting roles became increasingly rare after that. He was declared bankrupt in July 1991, with debts of £32,000, largely due to legal fees from his 1983 court case.

Adamson retired from acting after being declared bankrupt. In the final decade of his life, he lived on the state pension and benefits in a one-bedroom Housing Association flat in Welton, Lincolnshire. He revealed in an interview with The Sunday People in May 1994 that none of the Coronation Street cast had ever contacted him since his sacking and that he had written twice to Julie Goodyear, who he had been very close to during his time on the show, but she never replied.

== Personal life ==
Adamson married Jean Duncan on 2 December 1953. They had two sons. Jean, who had suffered from rheumatoid arthritis since her teens, died of septicaemia at Wrightington Hospital in Wigan on 26 September 1984, aged 52.

== Death ==
Adamson successfully underwent surgery for bowel cancer in 1990. He suffered from osteoarthritis and tinnitus in his later years.

Adamson died from stomach cancer in Lincoln County Hospital on 17 January 2002. He left £5,000 to his elder son Michael. Johnny Briggs paid tribute, as did Jean Alexander, who said, "It's sad he has gone, but I hope he is at peace now." No Coronation Street cast member, past or present, attended his funeral.
