= List of Coronation Street characters introduced in 1987 =

Coronation Street is a British soap opera, initially produced by Granada Television. Created by writer Tony Warren, Coronation Street first broadcast on ITV on 9 December 1960. The following is a list of characters introduced in the show's twenty-eighth year, by order of first appearance.

== Sarah Platt ==
Sarah-Louise Platt (also Tilsley and Grimshaw) is a fictional character from the British soap opera Coronation Street. She was born on screen during the episode broadcast on 2 February 1987. She was played by Leah King in 1987 and by Lynsay King from 1987 until 8 October 1999 when King opted to leave to focus on her education. Tina O'Brien took over the role on 31 October 1999; she opted to leave in 2007 and made her final on-screen appearance on 30 December 2007. A number of false rumours about O'Brien returning to the role surfaced during her absence from the serial. In October 2014, it was announced that O'Brien had reprised the role, she returned to filming in February 2015 and returned on screen on 30 March 2015. Sarah's storylines have included a controversial and ground-breaking underage pregnancy which saw her giving birth to Bethany Platt (Amy & Emily Walton, Lucy Fallon) and saw Sarah deal with motherhood in her teens, internet grooming, her friendship with Candice Stowe (Nikki Sanderson), her relationships with Todd (Bruno Langley) and Jason Grimshaw (Ryan Thomas) as well as her sibling rivalry between her and her half-brother David Platt (Thomas Ormson, Jack P. Shepherd). Her exit storyline saw her leave Weatherfield to start a new life with Bethany in Milan. Her return storyline saw her track down Bethany who had run away from home and returned to Weatherfield and begin a relationship with brother David's enemy Callum Logan (Sean Ward). Sarah was a central character in the shows third live episode which was aired to commemorate 60 years of ITV.

== Cecil Newton ==
Cecil Newton
- Coronation Street character
- Portrayed by: Kenneth Alan Taylor (1987–1990); George Baker (2003)
- Duration: 1987–1988, 1990, 2003
- First appearance: Episode 2708; 3 June 1987
- Last appearance: Episode 5635; 28 November 2003
- Introduced by: John G. Temple (1987); Mervyn Watson (1990); Kieran Roberts (2003)
In-universe information
- Occupation: Brewery boss
- Father: George Newton
- Brothers: George Newton Jr.
- Sisters: Anne Newton; Margaret Newton
- Sons: Philip Newton
- Grandsons: Henry Newton

Cecil Newton was the Brewery boss of Newton & Ridley. He first appeared in 1987 when Alec Gilroy wanted the tenancy of the Rovers Return Inn, as Bet Lynch had used the money she borrowed from Alec to buy the tenancy, but fled to Spain as she could not pay it back. Cecil agreed and also sent Alec out to Spain to search for Bet when they found out she was working in a bar there. Bet married Alec and they successfully applied for the tenancy. Cecil arrived in the pub a year later in 1988 when he suggested to Alec that the rent for staying in the Rovers should be increased, as the establishment was making a lot of money – unsurprisingly, Alec disagreed.

When the Gilroys were at risk of losing the pub in 1990, due to it being repossessed in preparation for a merge with 1 Coronation Street and conversion into an American theme pub, the local residents campaigned and argued with the brewery. Cecil came out of retirement to put a halt on the plans and told Bet and Alec that the pub was still theirs, belittling project manager Nigel Ridley for his foolish young ideas in the process, and declaring that the Rovers would always remain a working man's pub.

Thirteen years after he was last seen on the street, Bet met him again in November 2003 at the Newton & Ridley function in Blackpool. Cecil fell in love with her and asked her to marry him. However, Cecil's son, Philip, disapproved and tried to split them up and even told Bet that Cecil was going senile. During the ceremony, Cecil collapsed with a heart attack and later died in hospital.

== Jeff Singleton ==
Jeff Singleton
- Coronation Street character
- Portrayed by: Jonathan Barlow
- First appearance: Episode 2732; 8 June 1987
- Last appearance: Episode 2743; 15 July 1987
- Introduced by: John G. Temple
In-universe information
- Occupation: Joiner

Jeff Singleton was a joiner, who did some repair work at Jim's Cafe in June 1987, where he met Gail Tilsley (Helen Worth). Recently divorced from her husband Brian Tilsley (Christopher Quinten), Gail and Jeff dated briefly and he was very good with her two children, Nick (Warren Jackson) and Sarah-Louise Tilsley (Lynsey King), much to the dislike of Brian. Their relationship didn't last long and Jeff departed in July. Gail subsequently reconciled with Brian.

== Don Brennan ==
Don Brennan
- Coronation Street character
- Portrayed by: Geoffrey Hinsliff
- Duration: 1987–1997
- First appearance: Episode 2758; 7 September 1987
- Last appearance: Episode 4278; 8 October 1997
- Introduced by: John G. Temple
In-universe information
- Occupation: Taxi driver
- Father: Michael Brennan
- Mother: Bridget Brennan
- Sisters: Maureen Brennan
- Wife: Pat O'Connor (backstory); Ivy Tilsley (1988–1995)
- Sons: Gordon Brennan
- Daughters: Margaret Bell; Eileen Brennan
- Stepsons: Brian Tilsley
- First cousins: Bernard

Donald Michael "Don" Brennan is a fictional character from the British soap opera Coronation Street. He first appeared on 7 September 1987, and left on 8 October 1997, and was portrayed by Geoffrey Hinsliff throughout his time on the show.

The character Don first came to Weatherfield in 1987 as a taxi driver who first became acquainted with local resident Ivy Tilsley (Lynne Perrie) when she became one of his early fares. Their relationship steadily developed and they were eventually married on 13 June 1988. Don had two daughters and a son from his first marriage to a woman named Pat before she died back in 1981, but none of his children or his mother Bridget ever appeared again after the wedding episode.

In February 1989, Don comforted Ivy when her son Brian (Christopher Quinten) was stabbed to death outside a nightclub following the break-up of his marriage with her estranged daughter-in-law Gail (Helen Worth). Later, Don and Ivy's own marriage crumbled due to her erratic behaviour over preserving Brian's memory and that of her late spouse Bert. It was then Don had an affair with a woman named Julie Dewhurst (Su Elliot) until she decided to break it off. Ivy discovered the betrayal and broke up with Don, but they were reconciled after Don crashed his taxi and had to have his leg amputated.

Over the intervening years, Don befriended most of the neighbourhood. He was on good terms with Ivy's longtime companion Vera Duckworth (Liz Dawn) and became close friends with the latter's husband Jack (Bill Tarmey), whom he often spent time with at the Rovers Return Inn. At one point they joined most of the residents, including fellow neighbour Alf Roberts (Bryan Mosley), in standing up to local villain Alan Bradley (Mark Eden) inside the pub after he was accused of trying to kill shopkeeper Rita Fairclough (Barbara Knox). As such Don also befriended local mechanic Kevin Webster (Michael Le Vell) and his wife Sally (Sally Dynevor) after their eldest daughter Rosie was born in the back of his taxi on Christmas Day 1990.

A few years later, Don's marriage with Ivy was threatened once more when he fell in love with hairdresser Denise Osbourne (Denise Black). But then his romantic feelings for Denise soon turned into an obsession and he began making anonymous phone calls to Denise. She initially believed Ivy to be the culprit and confronted Ivy at her house, where Don intervened and confessed, leaving both women horrified by his actions. Denise reluctantly chose not to report Don to the authorities.

In 1994, Don and Ivy finally split up when Ivy left the street for a Catholic retreat, and she died in August 1995. Don and Gail, alongside Gail's new husband Martin Platt (Sean Wilson), were among those in attendance at the funeral. Don learned that Ivy left him nothing in his will and had instead given their house to her grandson Nick (Warren Jackson). Shocked by this discovery, Don argued with Gail and Martin about Nick's inheritance for a few months until things settled down; Don remained on good terms with Martin and Gail, having previously given them his blessing to marry against Ivy's consent before urging Martin to adopt both Nick and his sister Sarah-Louise (Lynsay & Leah King) as his surrogate children.

Over the course of these events, Don developed a gambling problem and ended up owing a lot of money to people. One such person was his sworn nemesis Mike Baldwin (Johnny Briggs), a local factory owner whom Don disliked as the years went on. Their conflict began when Don lost his taxi firm to Mike in a poker game and later confronted him for threatening Ivy's job at his factory at another point. Following Ivy's death Don seemed to have found new happiness with newly-arrived receptionist Josie Clarke (Ellie Haddington) and they formed a relationship, though he was unhappy when she got a job at Mike's factory. Don and Josie planned to make a fortune by purchasing Mike's garage from him, only to discover that he had tricked them into buying it for an inflated price. Although Josie quit her job at Mike's factory and tried to comfort Don in the hopes of fixing their money problem, Don impulsively blamed her for their financial situation and Josie left him.

Left on his own again, Don tried several things to save his garage from going bankrupt. He visited the bank to request a £10,000 loan, but was rejected because he already owed £6,000. He attempted to get Kevin and his colleague Tony Horrocks (Lee Warburton) to go into partnership with him, but they refused because of Don's poor decision-making. As a last resort, he planned to embezzle Nick's inheritance by tricking him into investing his money in the garage; however, Martin discovered this and put a stop to it before telling Don to stay away from the family. Consequently, Don is unable to save his business and is made redundant. He later drank his sorrows in the pub and confronted Mike for cheating him out of the garage. Mike goaded him and Don reacted by attempting to punch Mike, only to be left humiliated when Mike dodged it and then punched Don back in self-defence before Jack ordered Don to leave the pub.

Don became depressed and things got worse for him just before Christmas 1996. He was summoned to pick up Mike, but a confrontation ensued until the police intervened and caught Don in a drunken state. As a result, Don lost his licence and was suspended from driving for 18 months. Later he attempted to commit suicide in the garage, but was found by Kevin and Martin, and Gail then learned about the extent of Don's depression. Taking pity on Don, they invited him to spend Christmas Day with their family; Gail and Martin later confined to her half-brother Stephen Reid (Todd Bryce) about what happened when he started a business partnership with Mike, which soon ended abruptly after Stephen learned about the feud between Mike and Don themselves.

The year 1997 saw Don's quarrel with Mike escalate into a dangerous campaign of terror as he vowed revenge on Mike over the garage matter. At first Don's vendetta involved sending Mike threatening letters and then damaging a car that he believed was Mike's vehicle, only to then discover that it belonged to somebody else. But then Don broke into Mike's factory and set it on fire in the hopes of destroying his business. Mike confronted Don about it, but was rattled when Don happily confesses to it and taunted Mike that he will never be able to prove it. Mike called the police, but Don gave them a false alibi before suggesting that Mike had done it to get insurance money. The police believe Don and inform Mike about this.

However, Don's delight over supposedly getting one over Mike was short-lived; little did Don know that, in setting fire to Mike's factory, he had unknowingly destroyed evidence that would have implicated Mike for counterfeiting his products and thus got him jailed. Mike is soon acquitted and later receives the insurance money that all but saves his business from going into liquidation. When Don learned about this from Mike himself, he became enraged and decided to target Mike's wife Alma Sedgewick (Amanda Barrie) instead. Don started unsettling Alma with his presence during multiple encounters between them, but then one night Alma called a taxi to take her home one night and Don secretly picked her up even though he was already suspended from driving. Don attempted to make Alma believe that Mike is entirely to blame for everything that had happened to him, but she grew frightened of his behaviour and tries to flee. The situation culminated with Don attempting to kill himself and Alma by driving the vehicle into a canal; both survived and were hospitalised, with Don being held in police custody after Alma told her story. Gail and Martin are called to the hospital just as Mike arrived as well. When all three learned that Don kidnapped Alma and tried to kill her, Mike tried to attack Don until he restrained by Martin and a police guard; Martin then believed that Don was having mental issues whilst Gail disowned Don for his actions. Don was then arrested and held in police custody after being charged for Alma's kidnapping as well as attempted murder. When he looked set to face charges for arson as well, as the police were still investigating him for setting fire to Mike's factory, Don tried to frame his lodger Ashley Peacock (Steven Arnold) as the culprit and this led to Ashley being wrongfully arrested on suspicion of arson. This prompted Ashley's paternal guardian Fred Elliott (John Savident) to seek help from Mike in proving Ashley's innocence to the police, who were eventually forced to release Ashley from custody after Mike helped prove his innocence. Ashley then confronted Don for his betrayal when visiting him in prison, but became unnerved when Don started exhibiting mental issues; Don was later sent to a mental ward due to his increasingly unstable behaviour.

Several months later, Don was diagnosed with terminal pancreatic cancer and informed Martin. They make peace with each other before Don asked for Gail and Alma to visit him; both women agree with his request and Don apologised to Alma before making peace with her and Gail on separate occasions. Later on, however, he escaped from hospital and the police were summoned to search for him. While on the run, Don found out his house had been sold to new owner Les Battersby (Bruce Jones) and later visited Ashley to make peace with him as well. He also visited Brian's grave that same day to pay his respects before going into hiding. Don then decided to kill Mike and ambushed him at his new factory, knocking Mike out and holding him captive. Mike's employee, Angie Freeman (Deborah McAndrew), arrived at that moment and attacked Don with her shoe; Don flees as Mike urges her to phone Alma and the police, fearing for her safety. Mike then dashed outside to see Don has stolen Alma's vehicle, a MG Midget Roadster, after hearing him starting the engine. Don drove the car straight at Mike and tried to run him over, but Mike dived out of the way just in time. Don lost control of the car and crashed into the viaduct; Mike escaped unharmed, but Don was killed when the car exploded in a fireball on impact with him inside the vehicle, witnessed by Mike along with Rita and his arch-rival Ken Barlow (William Roache), both of whom had heard the commotion. The resulting stain of Don's fatal car crash and subsequent vehicle explosion would be evident for many years on the viaduct.

In the aftermath, Mike celebrated Don's death and made it clear to Alma that he is glad that Don is dead. Mike and Alma go to the pub that day, before Gail's mother Audrey Roberts (Sue Nicholls) asks the couple how they are coping; Mike replies "At least it was a happy ending – he's dead!". Don's funeral took place on 15 October 1997; Ashley and Martin attended the ceremony, along with Gail and later Nick, to pay their respects to Don.

== Barry Platt ==
Barry Platt
- Coronation Street character
- Portrayed by: John Jardine (1987); Richard Conway (1991)
- Duration: 1987, 1991
- First appearance: Episode 2765; 30 September 1987
- Last appearance: Episode 3284; 27 September 1991
- Introduced by: John G. Temple (1987); Mervyn Watson (1991)
In-universe information
- Wife: Barbara Platt
- Sons: Martin Platt
- Grandsons: David Platt; Nick Tilsley (adoptive)
- Granddaughters: Sarah Platt (adoptive); Charlotte Platt
- Other relatives: Lily Platt

Barry Platt is the father of Martin Platt. In September 1987, Rita Fairclough called at his house after she spotted Martin in Weatherfield when she had believed him to be in France with Jenny Bradley. Martin was not at home, but Barry confirmed that he had been back in the country for some time. Martin later explained to Rita that Jenny had refused to return with him and had remained in France with some students she befriended. Four years later, Barry attended Martin's wedding to Gail Tilsley, along with his wife Barbara. After the wedding, Barbara stayed on at Gail's house, 33 Hammond Road, to look after Gail and Martin's children while they went on a honeymoon to Abersoch, which Barry and Barbara had booked as a surprise to them which they presented at the reception in the Rovers Return.

Barry was played by John Jardine in 1987 and Richard Conway in 1991. It is not known why the character was recast although it was possibly because of Jardine's role as Randolph Taylor, a character he played in nine episodes in 1990 and reprised in 1992. In his 1991 appearance, the character was credited as Brian Platt.

== Amy Burton ==
Amy Burton
- Coronation Street character
- Portrayed by: Fanny Carby
- Duration: 1987–1988
- First appearance: Episode 2778; 16 November 1987
- Last appearance: Episode 2812; 9 March 1988
- Introduced by: John G. Temple
In-universe information
- Occupation: Cleaner
- Mother: Lilian Burton
- Brothers: Louie Burton
- Sisters: Edie Burton; Cissie Burton
- Daughters: Vera Burton
- Grandsons: Terry Duckworth
- Other relatives: Paul Clayton; Tommy Duckworth; Brad Armstrong

Amy Burton was the mother of Vera Duckworth. Amy moves in with Vera and her family, staying in her grandson Terry's freshly-vacated, freshly-decorated back bedroom – to the chagrin of Vera's husband Jack, who wanted to give the bedroom to his fellow decorator Wendy Farmer. Amy arrives from Rusholme, and Jack tries to persuade her that she doesn't want to lose her independence at her age, but Amy is determined to stay with Jack and Vera until she dies.

Amy soon sets her roots in Coronation Street, nagging Jack about his pigeons and developing an addiction for the slot machine in the public bar of the Rovers Return Inn. Vera won't hear a bad word said about Amy, from Jack or her best friend Ivy Tilsley, in face of Amy's abrasive behaviour. This leads to Jack threatening to leave Vera, unless Amy leaves first. Vera is upset that the two don't get on, but refuses to listen to Jack's argument. After pleading with Jack to give Amy another chance, and being refused, Vera decides that it is the lesser of two evils to throw Jack out into the street. The two do, however, reach a compromise and Jack sleeps on the sofa. However, Jack persuades Amy to take on a job and get out from under his feet.

In December 1987, Hilda Ogden quits her job at the Rovers Return Inn, ahead of her retirement from Weatherfield to Hartington, Derbyshire. Against Vera's wishes, Amy takes over Hilda's cleaning job for Bet and Alec Gilroy. This horrifies Jack, as it means he spends his work and home life in the same building as his mother-in-law. Jack tries in vain to get Hilda to take her job back, but Hilda is adamant that she won't return. Meanwhile, Amy causes trouble for the area's elder menfolk, accusing Percy Sugden of lechery, and telling Sam Tindall that he is "gorgeous". However, Amy herself falls into trouble when Sally Webster sees her shoplifting from Alf Roberts's shop, and then giving them to Vera as "presents". Audrey Roberts decides not to pursue the idea when Amy creates a fuss, but trouble doesn't end when Vera accuses Alf and Sally of setting Amy up. Amy's problem worsens, especially when Jack finds out she has been stealing bottles of stout from the Rovers. Jack is in charge of stocktaking and worries that Alec will accuse him of stealing. Vera refuses to believe it, but eventually realises that he is right. When Vera challenges Amy, she is accused of turning on her. Amy accuses Jack of being a terrible husband, and that he deserves to be thrown out. Vera finally sees Amy for what she is and loses her temper; Amy threatens to leave, and Vera calls her out on it. Vera packs Amy's cases and dumps her on Amy's sister, Edie.

In 1991, Amy's other sister Cissie calls Vera, breaking the news that Amy suffered a fatal heart attack while playing a game of bingo. Vera is riddled with guilt, having not visited Amy for some time. Jack tries to get out of the funeral, but makes a genuine effort for Vera at the funeral – but at the wake, he reverts to type and makes cracks about Amy's shoplifting. Cissie reveals to Jack and Vera that the only wish in Amy's will was that she take in Amy's friend, Joss Shackleton, who tells Vera that he is her natural father.
