= Foo Foo Lammar =

British drag queen (1937–2003)

- Born: Francis Joseph Pearson; 22 March 1937; Ancoats, Lancashire, England
- Died: 7 November 2003 (aged 66); Withington, Manchester, England
- Burial place: Gorton Cemetery
- Other names: Foo Foo Lamarr; Foo Foo Lamar; Frank Lammar; Frank Lamarr; Frank "Foo Foo" Lammar; Frank "Foo Foo" Lamarr; Frank "Foo Foo" Lamar
- Occupations: Drag queen Nightclub owner
- Partner: Billy Hughes

Francis Joseph Pearson (22 March 1937 – 7 November 2003) was a British drag queen and nightclub owner known professionally as Foo Foo Lammar. One of Northern England's most popular female impersonators, Lammar worked in entertainment for over thirty years and amassed a fortune of over £5m. He became an established name in Manchester from the 1970s onwards, and was well known in the city until his death in 2003.

== Early life ==
Francis Joseph Pearson was born to a working-class family on 22 March 1937 in Ancoats, Manchester. He was one of five brothers, and his father was a rag-and-bone merchant. Francis, known as Frank, left school at 15 without any qualifications and worked as a delivery boy for bread vans. This was followed by a stint at a cotton mill, and then Butterworths, a waste paper reclamation firm. In his teens, he was a boxer, and lived on the same street as future Coronation Street actor Bill Tarmey.

== Career ==
=== Drag queen ===
It was at the age of 20 that Pearson originally discovered drag; he claimed to have first worn a dress in a sketch at a Christmas party for mill girls. Whilst working in the paper mill as general manager, Pearson began to appear in pubs as Foo Foo Lamarr by night, taking the surname from the film actress Hedy Lamarr (the surname was latterly spelt as Lammar). It was suggested by him that the first name was a result of a Frenchman being unable to pronounce Frank. Lammar later told the story of his father throwing a bar stool at him after discovering what his son was doing. "Somebody told my dad that I was singing in the Ancoats Arms, but what they did not tell him was that I was stretched across the piano in a frock," Lammar commented.

The 1960s was a boom period for drag acts in the northern clubs, and by the 1970s, performers like Danny La Rue and Larry Grayson had made camp entertainment mainstream, a niche which Lammar slotted into. "Appearing on stage in blonde bouffant wigs and expensive sequinned gowns, he was known for his caustic wit and repartee with tough northern audiences", The Times wrote of his act.

Although drag has long been associated with the gay community, Lammar mainly played to straight audiences. "I don't see myself as a drag queen," he said, adding "I'm more of a comic in a frock." The Guardian described Lammar's performing persona as "an outrageous cross between Bet Lynch and Myra Breckinridge."

He appeared on television, radio and in theatres, working with La Rue. The BBC 1 series Nationwide profiled Lammar in a May 1981 edition of the programme, and he was a guest on TV chat shows, such as Granada's Weekend in December 1984. Lammar and his club were also the subject of an August 1985 episode of BBC Radio 4's Actuality documentary series titled "No Vulgarity Tonight", in which parts of his live act were broadcast. In an April 1990 episode of the BBC 1 TV drama Making Out, he had a cameo in character: appearing under his Foo Foo alter ego in a nightclub scene, he was billed as the Compere. Lammar's life was the subject of a short BBC 2 documentary, By Day, By Night, which was broadcast in August 1995.

In 1996, Lammar took part in Liz Dawn's House Party!, a direct-to-video release hosted by Coronation Street actress Liz Dawn. In October that year, he was seen in The Ghost of Ivy Tilsley, a Channel 4 documentary about another Coronation Street actress, Lynne Perrie, who had played Ivy Tilsley in the soap opera. In February 1997, Lammar had a small role in the final episode of the BBC comedy drama TV series Common as Muck. Lammar played Martin, a character seemingly based on himself, who wears drag and works in a nightclub. Lammar also hosted a segment for the Men & Motors channel, Hot Agony Aunt, in which he gave advice to viewers' problems.

=== Clubs ===
Lammar bought his first club, the Picador in Shudehill, located in Manchester's city centre, in 1971. He subsequently took over Celebrity, another city centre venue. Located in Dale Street, he renamed it Foo Foo's Palace, and the club became well-established. Lammar worked behind the bar, serving customers in full drag, before doing two turns as the cabaret entertainment, with two support acts in between. He would surprise audiences at the end by appearing as himself, minus the drag. Coachloads of hen parties would visit from around the country to see him perform. Foo Foo's Palace was also a favourite venue for Manchester United footballer players, and it was patronised by showbusiness personalities. Lammar also owned Monroe's, and a punk club, The Ranch, which was next door to Foo Foo's Palace.

In the early 1970s, he owned Napoleon's, thought to be Manchester's oldest gay bar. By the 1990s, the Canal Street area had become known as the city's gay village, and Lammar owned Cruz 101 there. In 1994, he opened Metz on Brazil Street. Lammar opened another branch of Metz in Liverpool in 1996.

=== Charity work ===
In his spare time, Lammar was a prolific fundraiser for local charities, such as the Royal Manchester Children's Hospital. His appearances at charity auctions would attract large donations from members of the public, and Lammar reportedly raised £4m for charity. In March 1997, The Times reported that he had obtained a donation of £500 for the Children's Hospital from Diana, Princess of Wales. Lammar was a patron and latterly chairman of the Wallness Children's Charity.

== Recordings ==
Lammar made a number of recordings as a singer, including two albums and two singles. The first album, My Life at the Palace: The Frank Lamarr Story, was recorded live in July 1976 at Foo Foo's Palace, whilst the second, My Own Special Creation, was recorded at Pennine Sound Studios in Oldham and released in the mid-1980s. Both included covers of well-known standards made famous by gay icons. "Foo Foo's Netball Team", backed with "Love You Being Around", was a single recorded at Strawberry Studios in Stockport and issued by Columbia in 1980, whilst "Around the Old Campfire", backed with "I'm Gonna Be Strong", was released in 1989.

== Personal life and death ==
Lammar was said to be "a familiar sight in his native city dressed in shiny suits and dripping in gaudy jewellery." He owned a number of Rolls-Royce cars with the licence plate FOO 1, and enjoyed giving lifts to locals. He was "devoted" to his mother Leah, taking her shopping every day and having tea at the bungalow he had bought for her in Moston.

A Manchester United supporter, he appeared in the film Manchester United: Beyond the Promised Land in 2000. The same year, Lammar was among those sharing their memories of his fellow Mancunian Les Dawson in an edition of ITV's The Unforgettable documentary series which profiled Dawson. Lammar was a friend of Dawson's, and they had been due to meet on the day of the latter's death in 1993.

Lammar lived in Shuttleworth, near Bury, in the 1990s, and at the time of his death, he was living in Piccadilly Village, an apartment complex in Ancoats. His autobiography, I Am What I Am, was published in 2002, with an introduction by the then-manager of Manchester United, Sir Alex Ferguson.

On 7 November 2003, after suffering from cancer, Lammar died at the Christie Hospital in Manchester, aged 66. As the funeral cortege made its way through the streets of Manchester, hundreds of people lined the streets. The ceremony took place at Corpus Christi Priory in Miles Platting, with readings given by Ferguson, actress Sue Johnston and former England captain Bryan Robson. Among those attending the funeral were television presenter Jeremy Beadle, former Greater Manchester Police Deputy Chief Constable John Stalker, and several Coronation Street actors, past and present: Bill Tarmey, Michael Le Vell, Ryan Thomas, Helen Worth and Chris Quinten. The funeral service was followed by a private burial at the family grave in Gorton Cemetery. Lammar was survived by his partner of 29 years, Billy Hughes.

== Legacy ==
A painted mural in Manchester's gay village features an image of Lammar, alongside several other historical figures with local links, including Emmeline Pankhurst, Quentin Crisp and Alan Turing. In addition, Lammars Restaurant & Bar on Hilton Street is named after him.
