= Elizabeth Lynch =

Elizabeth Lynch may refer to:

- Bet Lynch, fictional character from the TV soap opera Coronation Street
- Liz McColgan (née Lynch; born 1964), Scottish long-distance runner
