= The Very Famous Paul Ross Show =

The Very Famous Paul Ross Show was a television chat show pilot, presented by Paul Ross. The pilot aired on The Family Channel on 7 April 1996 at 7:10pm. It ran for just the one episode.

The programme was a mixture of chat and entertainment which aimed to deal with all forms of fame.

The pilot featured studio interviews with comedians Cannon and Ball, pop group Black Lace and actors Danniella Westbrook, Christopher Quinten and Lynne Perrie. Actor Adam West also gave an exclusive interview.

Another feature of the show included 'Driveways of the Rich and Famous', in which the driveways of President Bill Clinton and actor Brad Pitt featured.

Nicholas Parsons also investigated how much a celebrity can get away with.

The Sunday Mail newspaper chose the programme as one of their 'Star Choice' television highlights of the day.

The following year, Ross was given his own chat show for ITV, simply called 'The Paul Ross Show.'
