= The Ghost of Ivy Tilsley =

1996 British TV documentary

Lynne Perrie performing "The Hungry Years" on The Ghost Of Ivy Tilsey (1996).

The Ghost Of Ivy Tilsley was a Channel 4 documentary broadcast at 8.00pm on 5 October 1996. It was the first episode in a series of programmes titled The Fame Factor which looked at the dark side of fame.

The programme told the story of former Coronation Street actress Lynne Perrie, who spoke about how she had lost her sense of self in search of fame. Perrie was best known to the public as "Poison Ivy" Tilsley, despite having left the series in a blaze of publicity two years earlier after 23 years. She was filmed packing up to return to Yorkshire and her husband, Derrick Barksby, who had remained by her through all her scandals.

In scenes filmed in her home, Perrie spoke openly about her life and career. She was shown looking through scrapbooks and watching television clips of herself as Ivy Tilsley, of her appearances as Mrs. Casper in Kes and as a face in the crowd in Yanks. Reduced to a guest spot calling out numbers in a bingo hall, Perrie told people during an after-show autograph session that she was happy out of the Street and had finally realised fame was not important. She also candidly spoke about her loneliness, alcohol addiction and one-night stands whilst married, saying "they were not affairs, just happenings... I went from one man to another because I was lonely".

Throughout the documentary, there were short clips shown of her performing "The Hungry Years" in a Manchester nightclub owned by her friend, drag artist Frank "Foo Foo" Lammar. She was also shown visiting her HIV-stricken son Stephen at his home and bringing him a meal, as well as betting on a horse at the races with her husband and son.

To promote the documentary, Perrie gave numerous interviews to newspapers and magazines, and appeared on ITV's morning chat show GMTV, on which she performed the song "You Needed Me".
