= Lynne Perrie's Alternative Workout =

- Video sleeve
- Release date: 15 May 1995
- Country: United Kingdom
- Language: English

Lynne Perrie's Alternative Workout was a VHS tape released on 15 May 1995. It starred Coronation Street actress Lynne Perrie, who had left the programme the year before after a twenty-three years of playing Ivy Tilsley (later Brennan). It was a parody of a fitness programme, aimed at the comedy/soft-porn market. The video was distributed by a small company, Mastiff World Productions Ltd, and was certified as a 15.

== Plot ==
The video's blurb reads: "See our Lynne exert the least amount of energy as she takes you into her interpretation of what exercise is all about. Lynne takes a troupe of girls through her routine whilst enjoying a fantasy elsewhere with a bevvy of young men."

In the 50 minute film, Perrie appeared in a series of humorous sketches, teaching both men and women to exercise. Some of the video consisted of her being carried around in a bikini by hunky bodybuilders. The running joke throughout was that Perrie herself had no intention of exercising, but was enjoying the company of the young men, watching them workout and making smutty remarks whilst helping them out of their fitness clothing. The script by John G. Sutton featured Perrie in a hot tub with two young men saying "Don't mind you scrubbing my back dear, but is that a loofa you're using?" The video covered swimming, aerobics, exercise equipment and horse riding.

== Promotion ==
On the day of its release, Perrie made an appearance on Channel 4's popular morning television programme The Big Breakfast to promote it.

== Reception ==
Perrie had high hopes for what was her debut video (there were plans for a sequel), and told one journalist that it would sell more copies than Cindy Crawford's video. One journalist branded the video as "sleazy", and described the portrayal of herself in the film as "a tragic old nymphomaniac fondling young men".

The video sold poorly and was deleted in 1997, just two years after its release. Today, it is quite rare.
