= Ivy Tilsley =

Fictional character from Coronation Street

- Coronation Street character
- Portrayed by: Lynne Perrie
- Duration: 1971–1972, 1974–1994
- First appearance: Episode 1086; 14 June 1971
- Last appearance: Episode 3676; 25 March 1994
- Introduced by: H.V. Kershaw (1971); Leslie Duxbury (1974)
- Book appearances: Coronation Street: The Complete Saga
In-universe information
- Other names: Ivy Tyldesley (originally); Ivy Nelson (maiden name); Ivy Brennan (second married name)
- Occupation: Machinist
- Father: Jim Nelson
- Mother: Alice Nelson
- Sisters: Sheila Nelson
- Husband: Bert Tilsley (until 1984); Don Brennan (1988–1995)
- Sons: Brian Tilsley
- Stepsons: Gordon Brennan
- Stepdaughters: Margaret Bell; Eileen Brennan
- Grandsons: Nick Tilsley
- Granddaughters: Sarah Platt
- Nieces: Noreen
- Other relatives: Lynette; Bethany Platt; Billy Platt; Harry Platt; Sam Blakeman

Ivy Tilsley (originally credited as Ivy Tyldesley, also Brennan) is a fictional character from the British soap opera Coronation Street. Played by Lynne Perrie, Ivy first appeared on-screen on 14 June 1971, initially on a recurring basis, before becoming a regular in 1979. As the character continued development, Ivy's stringent religious beliefs would become a synonymous part of her storylines on the show.

Before becoming a regular character, much of Ivy's backstory is inconsistent; in her early appearances her husband was referred to as "Arthur", "Wilf" (with the surname "Tyldesley") and "Jack" (Bert Gaunt), who went on to appear in the show in 1975, after Ivy had stated she and Jack were childless. By the time she became a street resident and a more regular character, her husband was named "Bert" (Peter Dudley) and they had an adult son, Brian (Christopher Quinten).

Ivy is the grandmother of Nick Tilsley (Warren Jackson) and Sarah Platt (Lynsay and Leah King). Storylines have included her quarrel with Brian's wife Gail (Helen Worth), losing her husband and son; and forming a relationship with fellow resident Don Brennan (Geoffrey Hinsliff).

== Creation ==
=== Casting and characterisation ===
Perrie joined Coronation Street in 1971 as a semi-regular character before joining full time in 1979. The character of Ivy was described as a woman who had "a sharp tongue and staunch Roman Catholic beliefs". Ivy's Catholicism was something that developed as the character became more established. At Christmas 1976, Ivy stated she wasn't bothered about Christmas or religious holidays in general and didn't observe them.

=== Departure ===
In 1993, without consulting her bosses, Perrie had cosmetic surgery to make her lips look fuller, but the results received "unfortunate publicity", and Perrie was sacked from the show after twenty-three years as Ivy. The press speculated that her departure was a direct result of her plastic surgery, though Perrie denied this, insisting that she felt that her character had simply run its course. This version of events matched accounts given by the show's then producer Carolyn Reynolds. Ivy Tilsley died off-screen the following year. Perrie stated in a 1994 interview on 'The Word' she was unhappy that they didn't kill her character off and that she would only return to the show on the condition that it would centre around her death as she wanted closure.

== Storylines ==
Ivy is introduced as a worker at the Mark Brittain warehouse. She and another worker Edna Gee (Mavis Rogerson) started spreading rumours that Elsie Tanner's (Pat Phoenix) husband Alan Howard (Alan Browning) was having an affair. In 1975, the warehouse burned down and Edna died. Ivy soon began working for Mike Baldwin (Johnny Briggs) at Baldwin's Casuals, and was later elevated to supervisor. A staunch Catholic, Ivy vocally opposed Brian's relationship with the Protestant Gail Potter (Helen Worth), looking down on her and Gail's single unmarried mother, Audrey Potter (Sue Nicholls). Nevertheless, Brian and Gail married in 1979 in a Catholic ceremony; their son Nicky was born the following year. Ivy soon began interfering in Brian and Gail's marriage, setting her in frequent conflict with both Gail and Audrey over the years; she strongly disapproved of Gail's decision to return to work and leave Nicky with a childminder.

Ivy suffers her first personal tragedy in 1984 when her husband Bert (Peter Dudley) dies of a heart attack in a psychiatric hospital following a nervous breakdown. Ivy is further upset in 1986 when she learns that Gail has been having an affair with Brian's cousin Ian Latimer (Michael Loney); it is also discovered that Gail is pregnant and there are doubts as to whether Ian or Brian is the father. When the baby, Sarah-Louise, is born in February 1987, a paternity test proves Brian is the father. Despite this, Ivy never truly accepted Sarah as her granddaughter and most of her affections went to her grandson Nicky. After a short-lived romance with factory warehouseman George Wardle (Ron Davies), whom she dumped when she learned he was divorced, Ivy met widower Don Brennan (Geoffrey Hinsliff) one night when he drove her home in his taxi. The couple eventually began a relationship and married in 1988.

Ivy's biggest tragedy occurs in 1989 when Brian is stabbed to death outside a nightclub; she never fully recovers from his loss. She is later horrified to learn of Gail's relationship with Martin Platt (Sean Wilson), who is eleven years her junior. In 1990, when Gail discovers she is pregnant and plans to have an abortion, Martin persuades her not to. Upon announcing the pregnancy to the family, Ivy is mortified, insisting that Gail and Martin marry so that the child does not have the Tilsley name. The couple's son, David (Thomas Ormson), is born on Christmas Day 1990; Gail and Martin eventually marry in September 1991. With Martin hoping to formally adopt Nicky and Sarah (as well as observing Nicky referring to Martin as his father), Ivy felt the memories of Brian and Bert were being pushed out of her grandchildren's lives and attempted to smear Martin and Gail's reputations to the social worker overseeing the adoptions, but to no avail. Though Martin and Gail are comfortable as atheists, Ivy becomes obsessed with ensuring Nicky is raised within the Catholic faith he was christened into, believing it was what Brian would have wanted. Ivy further upsets the Platts by manipulating Nicky's passion for football, making him a member of the local Catholic church's football team, thus causing Martin to walk Nicky off the pitch. Ivy again causes friction with the Platts when Sarah repeats her threat if she and Nicky change their surnames from Tilsley to Platt, they will not inherit a penny from her will. At the intervention of Don and her best friend Vera Duckworth (Liz Dawn), Ivy bitterly accepts Martin as Nicky and Sarah's adoptive father for the sake of maintaining contact with her grandchildren.

In 1990, Ivy attends spiritual meetings and believes she is a psychic, claiming to have received a message from Ernest Bishop (Stephen Hancock) which she delivers to his unwilling widow Emily (Eileen Derbyshire), who is upset by Ivy's behaviour. She causes further upset by claiming to have been contacted by Bet Gilroy's (Julie Goodyear) deceased son, Martin Downes (Louis Selwyn), causing yet another conflict for Don to fish Ivy out of. She gives Gail a scare by telling her that Martin was involved in a car crash with a woman named Elizabeth.

In 1992, Ivy's fixation with meddling in the Platts' lives begins to take its toll on her marriage to Don, who becomes increasingly sympathetic and supportive of the Platts, which puts him in constant conflict with his wife. When Vera attempts to constructively criticise Ivy, this only leads to various arguments and fallouts. Don seeks solace through an affair with barmaid Julie Dewhurst (Su Elliot), revealing it to Ivy before he leaves her, saying she has transformed for the worst from the woman he initially married. Heartbroken Ivy seeks solace through alcoholism, leading to many embarrassing incidents, including Nicky witnessing her arguing with nanny Carmel Finnan (Catherine Cusack). She later has a meltdown in the Rovers, saying she has nothing left to live for, before eventually finding inner peace after some of words of wisdom from her local priest.

Ivy reconciles with Don in 1993 after his suicide attempt which results in him having his leg amputated. However, it is later revealed he is the secret telephone stalker of Denise Osbourne (Denise Black). In 1994, after accepting that the marriage is beyond repair, Ivy decides to go on a Catholic long-term retreat in a convent, where she dies in her sleep from a heart attack in August 1995. Her interference in the Platts' lives would continue beyond the grave; as she had always wanted her grandson Nicky to retain the surname Tilsley, Ivy stipulated in her will that Nicky would inherit her house (No.5) – but only if he changed his surname from Platt back to Tilsley, much to Gail and Martin's annoyance (Sarah escaped this condition as Ivy said that she would probably change her name in the future). Sarah and Don were left with nothing. Don is almost evicted as he and the Platts fight over Ivy's legacy; this eventually ends with Don buying No.5 from Nicky for £12,000. With Martin and Gail's blessing, Nicky changes his surname back to Tilsley.

In following years, having learned much from Ivy, Gail decides to protect her children from those whoever becomes involved with them. Because of her feud with Ivy, Gail begins her feud with Eileen over the years. In 2004 after her grandson's death, Gail mentions to Todd, who recently broke up with Sarah after he confessed that he was gay, how Ivy changed her life, despite their arguments and disagreements.

== Reception ==
Ivy was included in Digital Spy's feature on "bizarre" soap exits following off-screen scandals. Adam Beresford branded the character "the fearsome 'Poison Ivy'", and said it was "slightly incongruous" when she suddenly appeared with fuller lips. He continued, "Ivy's exit is unfortunate and possibly one of the reasons why the character doesn't get her due in the realm of Corrie icons. She was no pushover and was a believable battleaxe without being a caricature. Her power struggles with daughter-in-law Gail were legendary, and it was also fascinating to see a character whose religion dominated her life to such a degree."
