= The Tuesday Special =

The Tuesday Special was a topical television show which aired from 1991 to 1997 on ITV. Each programme dealt with a different topic, including trauma, bingo, making babies and Road rage.

On episode, broadcast, 21 November 1995 revealed and scrutinised the stories of people whose experiences have led them to believe they have lived a former life, including a woman who believes she was Mary Queen of Scots.

Sometimes, celebrities were called open to present certain entries in the series, including actress Lynne Perrie who presented 'Clairvoyants' in November 1994.
