= Fight Cancer =

- Genre: Documentary
- Directed by: Richard Trayler-Smith
- Presented by: Martyn Lewis; Lynne Perrie
- Starring: Russ Conway; Barbara Kelly; Diane Moran
- Country of origin: United kingdom
- Original language: English
- No. of series: 1
- No. of episodes: 6

Production
- Producer: Sarah Brewster
- Camera setup: Ashley Rowe
- Production company: Prospect Pictures for BBC TV

Original release
- Network: BBC1
- Release: 12 October – 23 November 1989

Fight Cancer is a 6-part health series challenging the negative attitudes that surround cancer. It was transmitted on BBC1 in 1989 and was presented by newscaster Martyn Lewis and actress Lynne Perrie, a cancer survivor. Perrie and Lewis travelled around Britain talking to other survivors.

The first episode was broadcast on BBC One on 12 October 1989, and in it, celebrities Russ Conway, Barbara Kelly and Diane Moran described their battles with cancer and their hopes for the future.
