= Vera Duckworth =

Fictional character from Coronation Street

- Coronation Street character
- Portrayed by: Liz Dawn
- Duration: 1974, 1976–2008, 2010
- First appearance: 19 August 1974
- Last appearance: 8 November 2010
- Introduced by: Leslie Duxbury (1974); Bill Podmore (1976); Phil Collinson (2010)
- Spin-off appearances: Coronation Street: Viva Las Vegas! (1997); Coronation Street: A Christmas Corrie (2012)
In-universe information
- Occupation: Mail order assistant Factory machinist Supermarket assistant Pub landlady B&B manager Café waitress
- Mother: Amy Burton
- Husband: Jack Duckworth (until 2008)
- Sons: Terry Duckworth
- Grandsons: Paul Clayton; Tommy Duckworth; Brad Armstrong
- Grandmothers: Lilian Burton
- Uncles: Louie Burton
- Aunts: Cissie Burton; Edie Burton

Vera Duckworth is a fictional character from the British ITV soap opera Coronation Street, played by Liz Dawn. Vera is known for her long-standing marriage to Jack Duckworth (Bill Tarmey); they became one of the best-loved couples in television history. Vera was often shown in a comedic light.

She first appeared on 19 August 1974 and last appeared on 18 January 2008, where the character peacefully died in her sleep at the age of 70 from heart failure. She reappeared posthumously for a single appearance on the 8 November 2010 episode, in which her husband Jack died.

== Development ==
=== Introduction ===
Vera (left) alongside Ivy Tilsley (right), as she appeared in her first scene in 1974

Originally, actress Liz Dawn was only contracted for a couple of episodes, but producers saw potential in the character of Vera and brought her back two years later for another short stint, before finally making Vera a regular from December 1976.

=== Jack and Vera ===
Vera's relationship with Jack Duckworth (Bill Tarmey) was always up and down; they had a rocky marriage, and sometimes Jack appeared to show little care for her. Tarmey describes the first few decades in the following manner: "He would never knowingly hurt people, and he loves Vera, although he doesn't always like her. He will defend her to the death, unless the chap slagging her off is bigger than he is! Jack is not a thief either!" In their "heyday," they were dubbed as the modern-day Stan (Bernard Youens) and Hilda Ogden (Jean Alexander). In their early days, Jack and Vera both had their fair share of dalliances. In 1982, whilst Vera was entertaining her own boyfriend, Jack had developed an attraction towards Bet Lynch (Julie Goodyear).

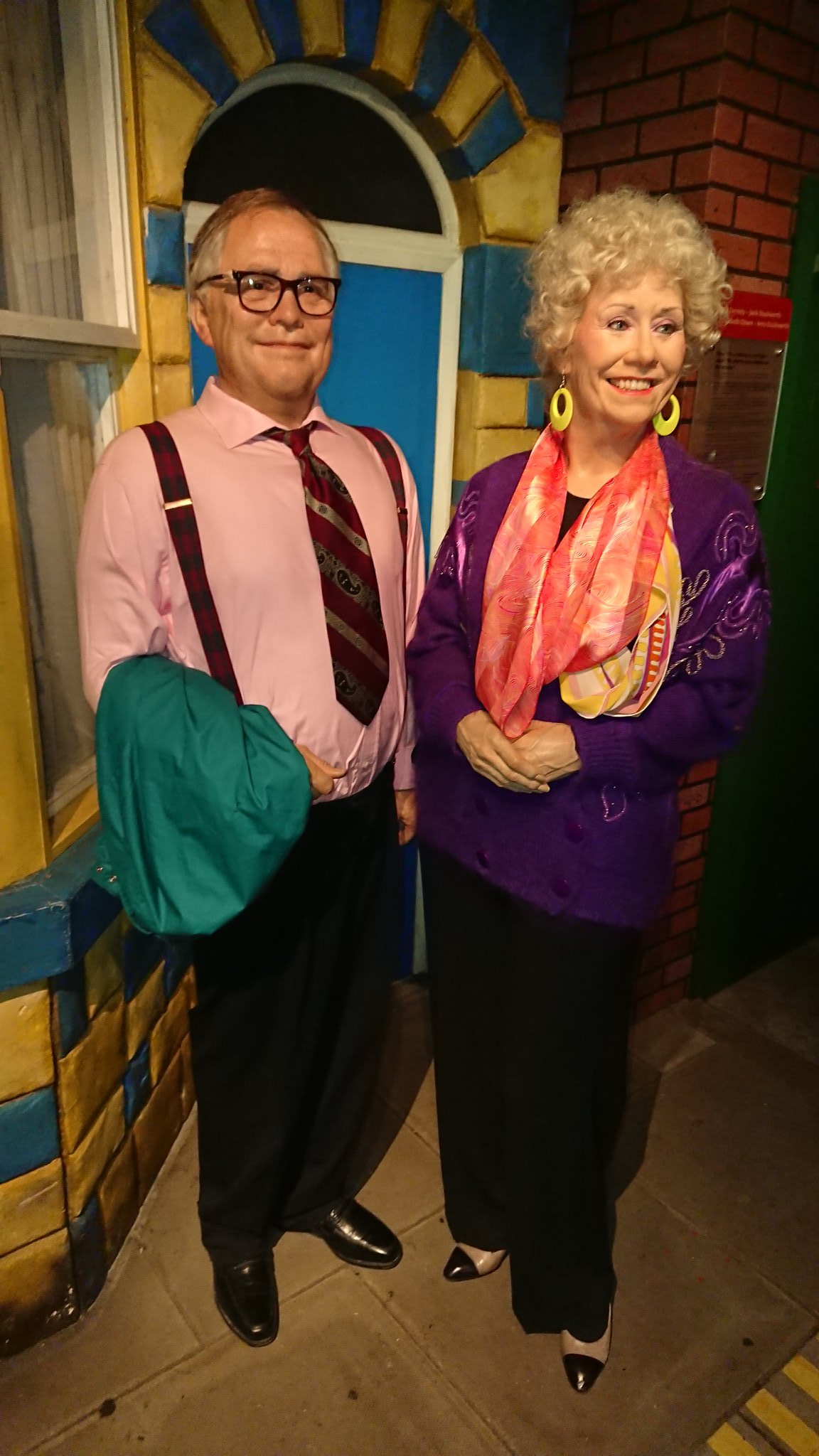
Jack and Vera waxworks at the Madame Tussaud's in Blackpool

They believed the storyline was a turning point for the two and was written with wit. Dawn opines: "It was very cleverly written, because Vera knew that Jack had a girlfriend on the side but she didn't know the other woman was Bet. So she chose Bet as someone to confide in, and she really opened her heart. It was quite moving as well as funny." This led to a classic showdown in the Rovers.

On 23 August 2010, it was confirmed that the actress would make a one-off appearance as the ghost of Vera Duckworth. The episode was broadcast on 8 November 2010. Husband Jack died from incurable cancer, and the scene was a reunion for the two characters. Producer Phil Collinson explained why they decided to include her: "It's something I've heard a lot. People say, 'When my mother was dying, she saw my father' [...] It's a story I've heard a few people say. We're storytellers at the end of the day. Yes, it's Coronation Street, and yes, it reflects real life, but we're storytellers." Whilst Executive producer Kieran Roberts opined that he would be surprised if anyone thought it was the wrong decision.

=== Departure ===
On 23 July 2007, it was announced that Dawn had quit her role as Vera and would depart the following year. Speaking of her departure, Dawn said: "It's been an amazing 34 years, I'd like to thank everyone for what has been the best time of my life." "We're indebted to her for all she has achieved during her years as Vera Duckworth," said Coronation Street executive producer Kieran Roberts. "We will always miss this wonderful lady and first-rate actress, and we are delighted she's agreed to return to the soap in the future." It was originally reported that producers were devising storylines for her character's departure, but they will leave the door open for the guest appearances Liz has already agreed to. On 30 October 2007, it was reported that Vera would be killed off, with her death being screened in the New Year. A spokeswoman said: "Three alternative endings have been written, but each will see Vera leaving husband Jack, family and friends devastated." Dawn admitted that she was pleased that Vera was killed off. "It is going to be very emotional filming Vera's death scenes but I do think it is the right decision for the character." Dawn said in an interview. Dawn's co-star Sally Whittaker who plays Sally Webster said Liz would be sadly missed by the cast and the soap would "never be the same again". Vera's death scenes were screened in episodes aired in January 2008.

== Storylines ==
Vera Duckworth first appears working in the Mark Brittan mail order warehouse on Coronation Street, and forms a friendship with Ivy Tilsley (Lynne Perrie). Vera later moves into the street, much to the dismay of her new neighbours. Although it is originally stated that Vera was divorced, that is later overlooked when her husband Jack Duckworth (Bill Tarmey) is introduced. They argue frequently, although she still makes an effort with Jack, often using the comically spoken phrase "Don't you love me any more, Jack?". Despite their problems, Jack and Vera care about each other.

The Duckworth marriage is always rocky due to their wayward son, Terry (Nigel Pivaro), and extramarital flings. Jack has an affair with Bet Lynch (Julie Goodyear), and goes on a dating programme in which he uses a fake name: Vince St Clair. Bet joins the dating programme and is shocked to see Jack's video. She encourages Vera to go, especially to see a video of a man named "Vince". Vera and the other girls then launch a plot for her to get even with Jack. Claiming she is a young widow, Vera arranges to meet "Vince" at The Rovers Return Inn. She was wearing a ginger wig as he approaches her from behind, then slowly turns around to face Jack much to the amusement of the pub crowd who were in on the joke.

Vera gets a job at Mike Baldwin's (Johnny Briggs) clothing factory – Baldwins Casuals. Vera works at the factory as a machinist, working alongside many of the street's residents including Ivy, Elsie Tanner (Pat Phoenix), Ida Clough (Helene Palmer), Shirley Armitage (Lisa Lewis), Ernest Bishop (Stephen Hancock) and Emily Bishop (Eileen Derbyshire). After working at the factory for many years, Mike sells it to developers, and it is demolished. Vera loses her job, but her lodger Curly Watts (Kevin Kennedy), gets her a job at Bettabuys supermarket, working under boss Reg Holdsworth (Ken Morley).

When the Duckworths inherit some money after Jack's brother dies, they buy The Rovers Return, with Vera becoming the landlady. However they later sell it to Alec Gilroy (Roy Barraclough). Vera and Jack move into Eunice Gee's (Meg Johnson) B&B, and when Eunice moves to Spain to help her sister run a bar, she leaves Vera and Jack as managers of the B&B. When Eunice sells the business, Vera decides to slow down a bit and get a job in Roy's Rolls café, working alongside Roy Cropper (David Neilson), Hayley Cropper (Julie Hesmondhalgh), Frankie Baldwin (Debra Stephenson) and Becky Granger (Katherine Kelly).

Jack and Vera take in lodger Tyrone Dobbs (Alan Halsall), who becomes somewhat of a surrogate son to them. Vera becomes restricted to her house due to an injury to her ankle and is cared for by Tyrone and Molly Compton (Vicky Binns). They buy her a baby monitor, so Jack, Molly, and Tyrone, can talk to Vera while they are in the pub. Later, Jack and Vera's grandson Paul Clayton (Tom Hudson), arrive on the street, but little did Vera know that Paul is scamming Jack and Vera out of money, stealing money from Jack and blaming it on Tyrone. Vera is disappointed in Tyrone, but Molly is adamant that Tyrone hasn't stolen the money. Vera refuses to believe this of Molly and could never believe that her own flesh and blood could steal from her. Vera decides that she and Jack are to move to their dream place of Blackpool, but Paul is forced to confess to Jack that he has stolen the money for the house. Jack is appalled but has to keep it secret from Vera, as he doesn't want to hurt her, and destroy her dreams. Vera still desperately wants to move to Blackpool, so Jack eventually tells Vera that he spent a lot of the money they saved to help Paul buy his half of the restaurant, but adds the excuse that he spent it before he knew they were going to Blackpool. Jack knows that if he told Vera the truth she would be heart broken, but she is still greatly upset, and goes to bed to get over the shock.

One night, Vera complains about her shoes and Jack sits her down and pulls them off. Vera tells Jack that she loves him, and she has never loved any one else, and pressures Jack to say the same. A little reluctantly, as always, he does, and grabs her slippers for her. He then says that he is going to go to The Rovers for a short while and although Vera tries to insist on him staying with her. He says he won't be long, and he has been with her all day and needs some time to relax. When he returns, Vera has died peacefully in her sleep. Jack remains calm and keeps Vera warm. When the paramedics arrive, they explain that Vera had died from heart failure in her sleep, but that she hadn't experienced any pain.

Over two years later, shortly before dying, Jack sees a vision of Vera and they both dance together.

== Reception ==
The Guardian columnist Grace Dent spoke with sadness of the passing of Vera Duckworth: "Saddest news on Corrie this month was the passing of street legend Vera Duckworth, leaving her husband and soulmate Jack to wander the cobbles alone. The final era of Vera was actually quite painful to witness. Vera's storyline, spanning 33 years, had no real big bangs or final flourish. Instead, Vera sat quietly, trapped on her sofa, dreaming of a house move to glamorous Blackpool which we all knew would never come. She was still broke, still being conned by errant family members, still one of life's noisy malcontents, but not the formidable force she once was. Regardless, it still felt to me like she'd go on forever, until the undertakers carried her away over the cobbles in a box, while Jack watched from the doorstep in hang-dog faced bewilderment."

12.5 million viewers tuned in to see the departure of the long serving and popular character. Jim Shelley called Jack's death scene with the ghostly appearance of Vera, "one of the most moving scenes ever seen in soap". In a 2021 Radio Times poll, Jack and Vera were voted as the joint fifth "soap pub landlord", receiving 6% of the votes.
