= Nick Tilsley =

Fictional character from Coronation Street

- Coronation Street character
- Ben Price as Nick Tilsley (2014)
- Portrayed by: Warren Jackson (1981–1996); Adam Rickitt (1997–2004); Ben Price (2009–present)
- Duration: 1981–1999, 2002–2004, 2009–present
- First appearance: 5 January 1981
- Introduced by: Bill Podmore (1981); Brian Park (1997); Kieran Roberts (2002); Kim Crowther (2009); Kate Oates (2018)
- Book appearances: Coronation Street: The Complete Saga
- Crossover appearances: The Jeremy Kyle Show (2010)
- Warren Jackson as Nick Tilsley (1996)
In-universe information
- Other names: Nick Platt
- Occupation: Businessman
- Father: Brian Tilsley
- Mother: Gail Platt
- Adoptive father: Martin Platt
- Stepfather: Richard Hillman; Joe McIntyre; Michael Rodwell; Jesse Chadwick
- Sisters: Sarah Platt
- Half-brothers: David Platt
- Half-sisters: Charlotte Platt (adoptive)
- Wife: Leanne Battersby (1998–1999, 2013–2014); Carla Connor (2016–2017); Elsa Tilsley (2017–2019)
- Sons: Sam Blakeman
- Stepsons: Simon Barlow (adoptive)
- Grandfathers: Bert Tilsley; Ted Page
- Grandmothers: Ivy Tilsley; Audrey Roberts
- Uncles: Stephen Reid
- Nephews: Billy Platt; Harry Platt; Max Turner (adoptive)
- Nieces: Bethany Platt; Lily Platt; Harper Platt
- Other relatives: George Shuttleworth

Nick Tilsley (also Platt, also known as Nicky) is a fictional character from the British ITV soap opera Coronation Street. He was born off screen during an episode broadcast on 31 December 1980, but made his first appearance on 5 January 1981. He was played by Warren Jackson from 1981 until 6 September 1996. Adam Rickitt took over the role on 15 October 1997 until 21 April 1999 but returned for three separate stints between 2002 and 2004 and made his final appearance as Nick on 11 July 2004. Ben Price took over the role on 21 December 2009. Price announced his intentions to leave the serial on 26 January 2017, before making his on-screen departure on 2 June 2017. However, on 23 April 2018, it was announced that Price would reprise his role as Nick, and he returned on 12 October 2018.

Nick is the first-born child of Brian Tilsley (Christopher Quinten) and Gail Platt (Helen Worth). He is the older brother of Sarah Platt (Tina O'Brien) and older half-brother of David Platt (Jack P. Shepherd) as well as the uncle of Bethany (Lucy Fallon) and Lily Platt (Brooke Malonie) and the grandson of Audrey Roberts (Sue Nicholls) and Ivy Tilsley (Lynne Perrie).

Nick's storylines have included his adolescent problems and his role in the fraught relationship between his parents, his first and second marriages to Leanne Battersby (Jane Danson) and their divorces, and his engagement to Maria Connor (Samia Smith). Since his return in 2009 his storylines have featured him remarrying and once again divorcing Leanne, his one-night stand with David's wife Kylie Platt (Paula Lane), suffering brain damage after being involved in a lorry crash which was caused by David, and his business partnership with and later marriage to Carla Connor (Alison King). In late-May 2017, after a trip to the seaside with his enemies Peter Barlow (Chris Gascoyne) and Steve McDonald (Simon Gregson), he became trapped in quicksand. Since his return in 2018 his storylines have included: stealing £80,000 from grandmother Audrey, reuniting with ex-wife Leanne, going into business with Carla, opening a barber shop called Trim Up North with brother David, using stolen money and discovering that he has a son with his ex-girlfriend Natasha Blakeman (Rachel Leskovac).

== Casting ==
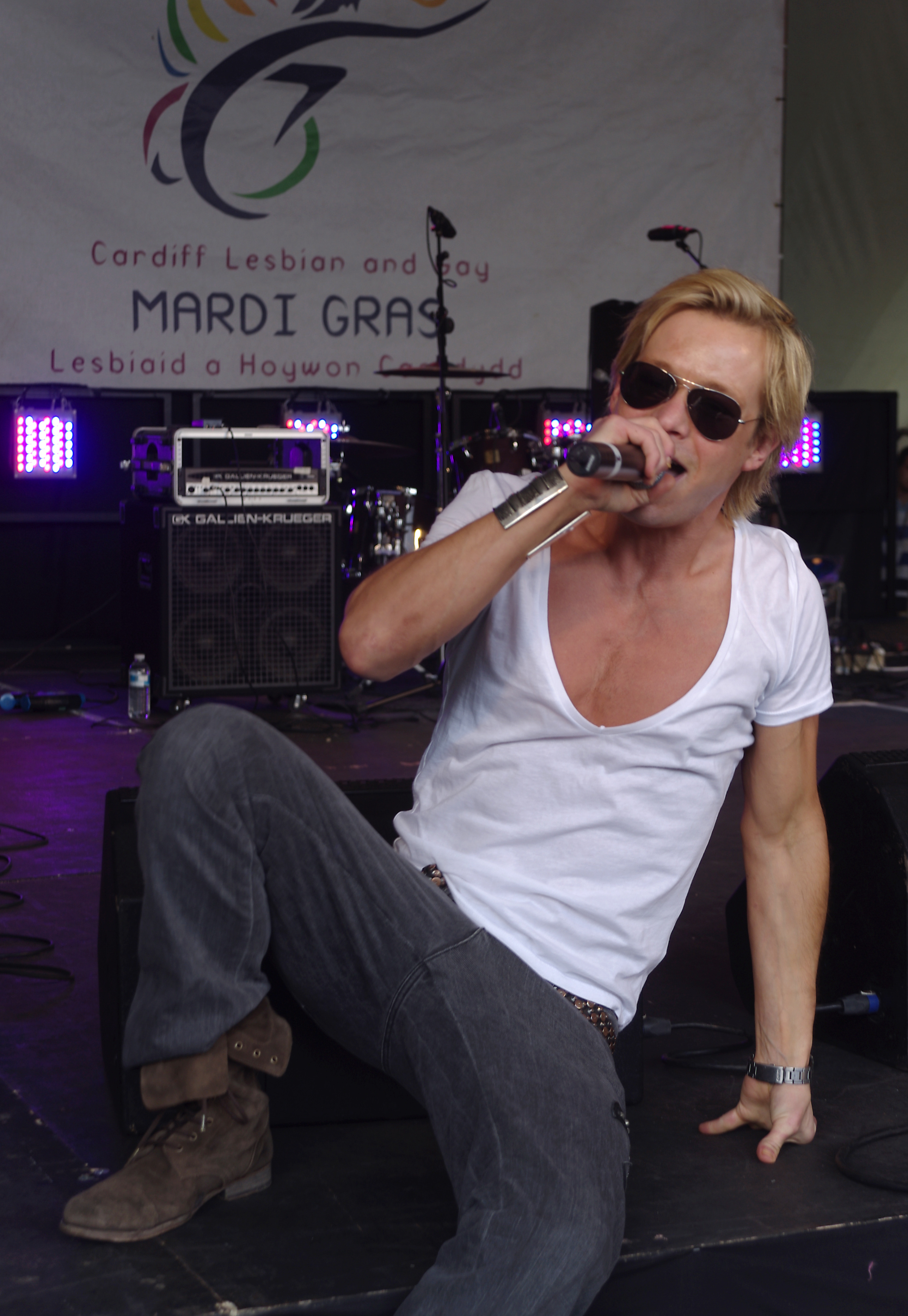
Adam Rickitt (pictured) was the second actor to play Nick. He turned down an offer to return in 2009 and the role was recast with Ben Price.

The character of Nick first appeared in 1981, portrayed by Warren Jackson. In 1996, Jackson decided to leave Coronation Street to focus on his GCSEs and assumed that he would return to the role the following year after his exams were finished, but was later axed from the programme completely.

The producers decided to reintroduce the character of Nick a year later in 1997, with the character being recast and now played by Adam Rickitt. After two years of playing Nick, Rickitt decided to leave the show and left in 1999, but he returned for two short stints in 2002 and from 2003 until 2004. He appeared as Nick for the last time in July 2004.

In early 2009, it was reported that producers were discussing bringing Nick back, but Rickitt was unavailable because he was starring in Shortland Street, a soap opera in New Zealand. The producers decided to recast the character for the second time. The role went to former Footballers' Wives' star Ben Price. Commenting on the recasting, Ben Price said "I'm not playing Adam Rickitt - I'm playing Nick and Nick's moved on [with his life]. It's been five years and you move a lot over that time. I'm sure people will think he's not like 'the other Nick', but hopefully they'll think I'm bringing something better, nicer or a bit different to the show. If I'm good enough, they'll go with it, but I can't worry about it too much." Price made his on-screen debut as Nick on 21 December 2009. In July 2010, it was reported that Rickitt turned down an offer to return. In June 2011, Price signed a new one-year contract.

== Development ==
=== Background ===
Nick Tilsley is the first-born child and only son of Brian Tilsley (Chris Quinten) and Gail Platt (Helen Worth), born on New Year's Eve 1980 and known as "Nicky". Nicky's first few years are spent in a happy home but Brian and Gail clash over Gail's desire to work and holier-than-thou attitude in her marriage, and Brian's immaturity. By 1986, Gail has had an affair with Tilsley family cousin, Ian Latimer, falling pregnant and splits up with Brian. The child, Sarah Louise (Lynsay King), is Brian's but he refuses to believe it and begins dating lawyer, Liz Turnbull. Nicky is a major issue in the relationship; Gail resents Liz spending time with him and Liz dumps Brian when she realises Nicky means more to Brian than her. Gail, meanwhile, is dating plumber, Jeff Singleton. When Brian sees Jeff and Nicky together, he snaps and kidnaps Nicky. The police set up a nationwide search, leading to a standoff between Gail and Brian at a motorway service station where Brian leaves with his son. Finally, Brian realises that Nicky does need his mother and they reconcile.

=== Characterisation ===
Nick has been described as sexy, a tease and handsome. When Nick returned in 2009, new actor Ben Price described the character as a smart businessman and always wanting control. He also stated that the character has changed a lot since 2004. "Nick's got to be a bit harder now. He's got to start running the Street and looking after his mum and start to get David into place, so I think it's good that they went with someone else."

=== Relationship with Leanne Battersby ===
Jane Danson, who plays Leanne, said she was "intrigued" by the decision to re-introduce Nick played by a different actor, Ben Price. Nick was married to Leanne from 1998 until 1999. Leanne and Nick split in 1999 and Nick started dating Maria Connor (Samia Smith). Speaking about Nick's re-introduction, Danson said it's interesting when an old character is re-introduced because even though it's a different actor, the previous baggage remains. Danson said that Nick has been involved with both Leanne and Maria and said obviously his family are there too so there is potential scope for that character. Danson said she does not know whether they will make anything of Leanne and him or not because she seems quite settled where she is. Danson revealed that there's always a possibility of revisiting it but Leanne would just wind up Nick.

In an interview with Soaplife, Price said that even though Nick has told Leanne that he still loves her, Leanne wants to be with Peter. Price added that there is always a chance with Leanne and Nick to get back together.

=== Relationship with Erica Holroyd ===
In September 2014, it was announced that Coronation Street producers had signed up former Emmerdale and Bad Girls star Claire King for a guest stint as Erica Holroyd. It was revealed that the newcomer's arrival leads to some happier times for Nick as Erica immediately sets her sights on him, leading to a fling between the pair. Producer Stuart Blackburn said: "Erica is a woman who lives life to the full. Nick doesn't stand a chance once she has set her sights on him, but he's not complaining." Speaking about the storyline for the first time, Price said: "He's copped a stunner. I think he is going to have the best time of his life. He has had a depressing few years so I think this is great for him, really. I think he is just enjoying the moment, she is perfect for him at the minute. She's light, funny, has been around a bit and she is an adult about things. He has still got issues so he is not looking for anything serious. I think he is still struggling with himself and how he feels, so I think he just wants a laugh and a bit of fun." Price also revealed that he doesn't think Nick is ready for a long-term relationship at the moment saying; "I think he needs a bit of time [before a new relationship] especially after Leanne has come back to the Bistro," Price said. "It's great, he has seen what he has lost now but he is not the guy he was, so it will take a while to get back, I think." Praising the pairing, King revealed that Erica and Nick work well together as neither of them wants anything more serious; "Erica wants it to be a fling and I think he wants the same, but she's worried because it's New Year's Eve and she has to tell him that, not knowing how he really feels, Luckily he's thinking the same so it's quite a good little catch. She continued: "Perhaps because she's more mature and not a kid, she can handle just being friends with benefits. I think he's quite capable of doing that and enjoys having her around, she brings him out of his shell as well as his suits. It has been really good for both of them, so they possibly could just go on and there wouldn't be any jealousy and negative things you can get with someone that is a bit younger. They are both mature enough to handle it and to enjoy themselves sexually too." In April 2015, it was revealed that Nick would be given a huge surprise when Erica arrived back in Weatherfield and tells Nick that she is pregnant with his baby. Speaking of Nick's reaction to the pregnancy, Price said; "He's supposed to meet Carla and Erica puts her hands over his eyes which makes it a bit awkward, because he thinks she's Carla. Then he thinks great, she's a mate. When he finds out she's pregnant, it's very tricky for him. Not that he'd run away because he's always wanted a kid, it's just not the best situation. It's a shock! His reaction is that he's shocked, but he's there for her. They may not be a couple but he's there for her and she just needs to tell him what she needs. He's very practical about it." Asked if Erica wants them to bring up the baby together as a couple, Price answered; "No, she doesn't want them to be a couple. She's absolutely cool about it."

=== Departure (2017) ===
On 26 January 2017, it was reported that Nick would exit in an "explosive storyline". ITV confirmed the reports a day later on 27 January 2017. A storyline was created to build up to his departure. A special week of the episodes aired from 29 May to 2 June alongside the Britain's Got Talent semi-final just like in previous years. His final scenes aired on 2 June 2017.

=== Reintroduction (2018) ===
On 23 April 2018, it was announced that Price would reprise his role as Nick. He returned on 12 October 2018.

== Role in Coronation Street ==
Nick Tilsley is born in 1980 to Gail and Brian Tilsley. After Brian's murder in 1989, Gail's second husband Martin Platt adopts him, creating lasting conflict with Brian's mother Ivy Tilsley, who later leaves Nick an inheritance on condition that he resume the Tilsley surname. As a teenager, Nick becomes increasingly rebellious and is eventually sent to live with Gail's half-brother Stephen Reid in Canada. On his returns to Weatherfield during the late 1990s and early 2000s, Nick is involved in relationships with Leanne Battersby and Maria Sutherland, and is briefly drawn into Todd Grimshaw's coming-out storyline. He leaves again in 2004.

Nick returns in 2009, now played by Ben Price, and becomes involved in business ventures including Underworld, The Joinery and later the Bistro. His most significant storylines after his return centre on his long-running relationship with Leanne. The two reunite after her marriage to Peter Barlow breaks down, but their relationship is repeatedly strained, including by Nick's one-night stand with Kylie Platt, which contributes to a major rift within the Platt family. In 2013, after a struggle with David causes a road accident, Nick is left with a brain injury that affects his memory, mood and behaviour.

Nick later has relationships with Erica Holroyd and Carla Connor, marrying Carla in 2016, though the marriage quickly collapses. He reunites with Leanne when she becomes pregnant with Oliver, despite learning that the child's biological father is Steve McDonald. Nick leaves in 2017 but returns in 2018, and later becomes central to storylines involving Audrey's stolen money, the death of Oliver, and the discovery that he has a son, Sam Blakeman, with Natasha. Nick's later storylines focus on his relationships with Leanne and Sam, and his involvement in the fallout from Harvey Gaskell's criminal activities.

== Reception ==
In her review of soaps during the first half of 2010, Low Culture columnist Ruth Deller criticised the casting of Ben Price in the role of Nick, by stating: "we're all familiar with the way characters can suffer from SORAS (soap opera rapid ageing syndrome), but this usually happens to child or teen characters, not characters in their late twenties. However, it must have happened to Nick – how else would you explain him returning to the soap ten years older than he should be? Casting a much older actor was never going to be the easiest transition, but that aside, there doesn't seem to have been an awful lot of point to his on/off return. He wasn't the most likeable character when he was in it before and he isn't particularly interesting now." In 2014, Matt Bramford from What to Watch put Nick's recasting on his list of the 18 best recastings in British and Australian soap operas, commenting, "In a transformation that nobody will forget, little Nicky Tilsley (played by Warren Jackson) reappeared one year on with long blonde hair and rock hard abs; yep - pop heart-throb Adam..." In August 2017, Price was longlisted for Best Exit at the Inside Soap Awards, while Nick's quicksand accident was longlisted for Best Show-Stopper. Neither nominations progressed to the viewer-voted shortlist. Alex Ross from Planet Radio noted how Rickett's version of the character was "adored by fans". In 2017, Laura-Jayne Tyler from Inside Soap complained about Nick's "endless wittering and childish, spiteful game-playing", and called for Nick's exit to occur "sharpish".

== See also ==
- List of soap opera villains

== Bibliography ==
- Little, Daran (1998). The Coronation Street Story: Celebrating Thirty-Five Years of the Street. Boxtree. ISBN 0-7522-1019-X.
