= Leeds United! =

- Play for Today episode
- Episode no.: Series 5 Episode 1
- Directed by: Roy Battersby
- Written by: Colin Welland
- Original air date: 31 October 1974

Episode chronology
← Previous "A Follower For Emily"	Next → "Baby Love"

"Leeds United!" is the first episode of fifth season of the British BBC anthology TV series Play for Today. The episode was a television play that was originally broadcast on 31 October 1974. "Leeds United!" was written by Colin Welland, directed by Roy Battersby, produced by Kenith Trodd, and starred Lynne Perrie.

== Background ==
The film is based on an unofficial strike amongst female textile workers in Leeds in February 1970, demanding equal pay with male workers. Dramatist Colin Welland's mother-in-law was involved in the strike, and Welland interviewed many of those involved while preparing his script. This was the first strike by the textile workers in Leeds in 36 years.

The script was originally written for Granada Television, but they rejected it initially on the grounds that it would be too expensive, although it later emerged that some at Granada were worried that the political radicalism of the play might upset advertisers. Welland then took the script to the BBC, and it was produced for the Play for Today series. After being accepted in May 1972, the play's production was continuously held up by concerns about defamation, made particularly acute by filming in Leeds, and some aspects of the play were changed to obscure the identities of the employers in the 1970 strike.

== Plot ==
The play begins with a group of women returning to work at John Black's textile mill after a strike, unhappy with the deal negotiated by the union. At a meeting of workers, Gridley (a Communist) states that a union conference in July had rejected the women's request for a shilling-per-hour increase, and had now negotiated separate deals for male and female workers to end the latest strike. On Gridley's advice, the female workers vote to strike. They then march through Leeds, singing a song about "a bob an hour". They then begin to picket other textile mills at Boswell's and Bent's.

Union representative Billy Crane refuses to meet the strikers and recommends a return to work, but he does meet with John Black. They agree that the workers are being manipulated by a few political activists.

Flying pickets then visit the north-east and the strike spreads there. Some confrontations follow with those reluctant to strike. Strikers force an evacuation of workers from one mill by burning paper, and storm the gate at another mill. A woman who says that she cannot afford to strike because she has children to feed is told that this is the case for all the strikers.

The employers in Leeds struggle to reach an agreement on how to respond to the strike. Bentham is less aggressive than Black, and wants to keep good relations with the union for future job cuts.

Workers at Bentham's and Stringer's then join the strike. A week in, Maggie's mother dies and she attends her mother's funeral. Conflict grows between the strikers and the union.

Although Packer and Gridley are told to demand a shilling per hour, they are willing to find a compromise when meeting the employers. They agree a return to work for an interim rewards plus negotiations. Maggie leads a revolt against this agreement, and a huge crowd at Woodhouse Moor shouts down Gridley. Maggie claims that shop stewards are undermining the strike, and the crowd votes to continue striking.

After a few days of discussions, the committee agrees to end the strike. Mollie later slaps Joe for referring to politics as "the art of the attainable".

Shortly afterwards, many of the workers are made redundant. Gridley is given a large amount of compensation, but Peggy is given just £5 after 26 years of work.

== Cast ==
- Lynne Perrie as Mollie
- Elizabeth Spriggs as Maggie
- Lori Wells as Sadie
- Josie Lane as Annie
- Bert Gaunt as Harry Gridley
- Stan Stennett as Joe Pike
- Peter Wallis as Fred Packer
- Bernard Archard as managing director, Blacks
- Stanley Meadows as managing director, Benthams
- Terence Frisby as Raymond Boswell
- Peter Cellier as Philip Stringer
- Pat Wallis as Rhona
- Peter Russell as Stan Lloyd
- Christine Buckley as Joan
- Frances Goodall as Peggy
- John Comer as Billy Crane
- Martin Dempsey as Union Regional Secretary
- George Silver as Bent
- Tony Heath as Isaacs
- Denis Huckerby as King
- Duggie Brown as bus conductor
- Gwen Harris as older worker
- Dennis Lawes as older worker
- Terry Waddington as Dennis Jones
- Sue Dexter as Mrs Hesketh
- Nanette Ryder as Mrs Gridley
- Muriel Lawfor as Florrie
- Wendy Marshal as young girl
- Bernard Atha as radio reporter
- Alex Robinson as town hall chairman
- Liz Dawn as striker

== Controversy ==
The play's accuracy was challenged by employers and unions. The play was discussed on BBC2's In Vision programme the following day, with a panel including producer Kenith Trodd, employers and workers from the textile mills involved, and some journalists. Trodd quoted news reports from the time to defend the accuracy of the film.

The portrayal of the Communist Party member Gridley as duplicitous led to the play's being praised by Trotskyist groups such as the Workers' Revolutionary Party and condemned as "a snide distortion" by the Communist Morning Star.

In addition, there was some controversy on the use of profanity by women in the film (although these cases are relatively mild terms). In the 1970s, swearing was still considered unladylike. Some of the female strikers who defended the factual accuracy of the film added that they would never swear. Roy Battersby said that he felt that some of these women were embarrassed by the prospect of their husbands finding out they swore at work.
