= List of Coronation Street characters introduced in 1978 =

1978 saw several characters making their debuts on the British soap opera Coronation Street, including Ed Jackson, Ida Clough and Brian Tilsley.

== Ed Jackson ==
Ed Jackson
- Coronation Street character
- Portrayed by: Dave Parke (1978); Chris Walker (2005–2006)
- Duration: 1978, 2005–2006
- First appearance: 4 January 1978
- Last appearance: 10 March 2006
- Introduced by: Bill Podmore (1978); Tony Wood (2005)
- Book appearances: Coronation Street: The Complete Saga

Thomas Edward "Ed" Jackson was one of two robbers who staged a robbery on Mike Baldwin's (Johnny Briggs) factory. Ed (known then as "Tommo") and his friend Dave followed Mike, and his wages clerk Ernest Bishop (Stephen Hancock) to the bank and then to the factory. They began to menace Ernest out of the wages he had been preparing. Mike began to wonder what was taking so long and opened the door, knocking Ed, causing him to shoot Ernest, who later died in hospital.

Ed returned in 2005. He befriended Ernest's widow Emily Bishop (Eileen Derbyshire) at church and began dating Eileen Grimshaw (Sue Cleaver). Ed divulged to Emily his prison background and subsequently revealed that he was responsible for the death of Ernest. Emily expressed her disgust at this revelation and born again Christian Ed dramatically contemplated suicide, but Emily forgave him when he asked her for forgiveness. She gave him Ernest's old camera, and made him promise to send her Christmas cards, with a photograph of himself every year to show her he was alive and well. With that Ed left Weatherfield.

== Ida Clough ==
Ida Clough
- Coronation Street character
- Portrayed by: Helene Palmer
- Duration: 1978–1988; 1995–1998
- First appearance: 3 April 1978
- Last appearance: 19 August 1998
- Introduced by: Bill Podmore (1978); Sue Pritchard (1995)
In-universe information
- Occupation: Machinist
- Husband: Eric Clough
- Sons: Bernard Clough
- Daughters: Muriel Clough

Ida Clough (also Bulmer) was played by Helene Palmer. Ida first appeared in 1978 she was a machinist at Baldwin's Casuals and was always militant and behind anyone who wanted to strike. Over the years she worked alongside Ivy Tilsley (Lynne Perrie), Vera Duckworth (Liz Dawn), Elsie Tanner (Pat Phoenix) and Shirley Armitage (Lisa Lewis).

In 1980, Ida went head to head with Ivy to become the union leader, but she lost out. When Mike Baldwin (Johnny Briggs) was charged with drink driving in 1988, it had been Ida who had reported him and Mike sacked her. Ida returned to the street for Ivy's funeral in 1995 and Mike agreed to take her back at the factory. This time, she was working alongside Janice Battersby (Vicky Entwistle) and Sally Webster (Sally Whittaker). In 1997, when the Duckworths decided to renew their wedding vows in Las Vegas, Vera suggested they fly Ida out as a witness. Ida made her last appearance in Coronation Street in August 1998. Her final appearance saw her help her colleague Hayley Patterson (Julie Hesmondhalgh), whom Mike had sacked for being a transsexual, get her job back by threatening to take Mike to an industrial tribunal. Ida's fate since then is unknown but at Vera's funeral in January 2008, Rita Sullivan (Barbara Knox) spoke about Vera, Ivy and Ida in the past tense, implying that Ida had died prior to 2008.

== Brian Tilsley ==
Brian Tilsley
- Coronation Street character
- Portrayed by: Christopher Quinten
- Duration: 1978–1989
- First appearance: 27 December 1978
- Last appearance: 15 February 1989
- Introduced by: Bill Podmore
- Book appearances: Coronation Street: The Complete Saga
In-universe information
- Occupation: Mechanic
- Father: Bert Tilsley
- Mother: Ivy Tilsley
- Wife: Gail Potter (1979–1987, 1988–1989)
- Sons: Nick Tilsley
- Daughters: Sarah Platt
- Grandsons: Billy Platt; Harry Platt; Sam Blakeman
- Granddaughters: Bethany Platt
- Grandfathers: Jim Nelson
- Grandmothers: Alice Nelson
- Uncles: Trevor Tilsley
- Aunts: Ethel Latimer; Doris Tilsley; Sheila Nelson
- First cousins: Ian Latimer; Craig Tilsley; Samantha Tilsley; Noreen

Brian John Tilsley was played by Christopher Quinten. The son of Bert (Peter Dudley) and Ivy Tilsley (Lynne Perrie), he married Gail Potter (Helen Worth) in 1979 and they had two children: Nick (Warren Jackson), born in 1980, and Sarah-Louise (Lynsay King) in 1987. At the time Gail got pregnant with Sarah, she was having an affair with Brian's cousin, Ian Latimer (Michael Loney), and was unsure who Sarah's father was. A blood test later revealed that Brian was her father but Gail refused to tell Brian until her mother, Audrey Roberts (Sue Nicholls), let the truth slip during an argument with Brian's mother, Ivy. Brian adjusted to Gail's infidelity but did not reconcile with Gail for some time; he briefly absconded with Nick when a break-up looked likely. Ivy always believed that Ian was Sarah's father. Brian and Gail eventually divorced, but got back together for the sake of their children and married again in February 1988. The marriage did not last and on 15 February 1989, Brian was stabbed to death whilst protecting a woman from some youths outside a nightclub.

After Brian's death, Ivy continues for his son Nicky to protect his memory. Eventually, this failed when Martin Platt (Sean Wilson) adopted him and Sarah. Despite this, Ivy then wrote the cause of her will that Nicky could only gain her house and the entire estate on the condition of changing his name from Platt back to Tilsley. With no other choice, Gail told Martin to accept it knowing that Ivy blamed her for his death. Years later, Nick (now a teenager) was shocked by an accidental meeting with Darren Whateley (Ian Aspinall), the man who had killed his father.

In July 2016, Brian was mentioned by Gail after her daughter-in-law, Kylie Platt (Paula Lane), was stabbed and died. When supporting her son David Platt (Jack P. Shepherd), she revealed how tough it was telling Nick about Brian's death and urged him to tell him and Kylie's two children, Max Turner (Harry McDermott) and Lily Platt (Brooke Malonie), the truth about what happened and make sure they understand.

In 2018, a lady called Rosemary Piper (Sophie Thompson) claims that she is getting messages for Gail from Brian, as well as Gail's other three deceased husbands, which she believes until Roy Cropper (David Neilson) exposes Rosemary as a fraud who is working with con artist Lewis Archer (Nigel Havers).
