= Bet Lynch =

Fictional character from Coronation Street

- Coronation Street character
- Portrayed by: Julie Goodyear
- Duration: 1966, 1970–1995, 2002–2003
- First appearance: Episode 569; 25 May 1966
- Last appearance: Episode 5636; 30 November 2003
- Introduced by: Howard Baker (1966); June Howson (1970); Kieran Roberts (2002, 2003)
- Book appearances: Coronation Street: The Complete Saga; Coronation Street: The War Years
- Spin-off appearances: Coronation Street: After Hours (1999)
In-universe information
- Occupation: Factory worker Barmaid; Pub manager Pub landlady Businesswoman
- Father: Patrick Lynch
- Mother: Mary Lynch
- Husband: Alec Gilroy (1987–1999)
- Sons: Martin Downes
- Stepdaughters: Sandra Arden
- Aunts: Ethel; Mabel

Bet Lynch (also Gilroy) is a fictional character from the British ITV soap opera Coronation Street. Played by Julie Goodyear, the character first appeared on screen during the episode airing on 25 May 1966. Appearing over 25 years, Bet became one of Coronation Street's icons.

Bet first appeared in May 1966, but did not become a regular until 1970. In October 1995, Goodyear made a permanent departure in a storyline which saw Bet unable to raise the funds to purchase the Freehold of the Rovers Return and subsequently flee Weatherfield. She returned in June 2002 in what was intended to be a permanent return for the character. However, Goodyear quit after just two weeks, this being put down to the heavy work schedule. The following year, Goodyear returned temporarily in a storyline that accommodated the return of Beverley Callard as Liz McDonald. Bet last appeared in November 2003.

Bet was initially made a barmaid at the Rovers Return Inn and later became the landlady in 1985. She likes to dress in a way she considers glamorous, and has a fondness for leopard print clothes and a beehive hairstyle. Her style partly inspired the look for Freddie Mercury's drag character in the 1984 music video for "I Want to Break Free" by rock band Queen.

== Creation ==
=== Background ===
Information about the character first surfaced to the public on 2 June 1966, when the Heywood Advertiser ran the story that Coronation Street was going through 'a little facelift' and the character of Bet Lynch was to be introduced. The publication that gave a little background to the character prior to appearing onscreen said: "Julie aged 22 has been working for a model sometime, but has also been on the files at Granada. When it was decided to inject more life into the series, she was offered the part as Bet, a typical Lancashire mill girl, who will be working at the new factory which is opening in 'the Street'."

The character then first appears in 1966 (as presumed) as a factory worker who gives Lucille Hewitt (Jennifer Moss) a black eye. She quickly departs with the explanation she has moved away (actress Patricia Phoenix was also rumoured to have told Goodyear to return to the programme when she gained a little more acting experience). Bet returns in 1970, when she shares a flat with Irma Barlow (Sandra Gough), who put a down payment on it with the help of Len Fairclough (Peter Adamson) and Ray Langton (Neville Buswell). Bet begins work as a barmaid at the Rover's Return. The earlier incident with Lucille is not mentioned again and the two became good friends.

=== Casting ===
Actress Julie Goodyear was offered the supporting role of Bet Lynch for a period of six weeks by Lucy Clayton, which she took without hesitation. Goodyear was convinced that she would continue in the role on a permanent basis and was shocked when they let her go at the end of her originally contracted period. When Goodyear filmed a part for a drama series, Family at War, the director June Howson complimented her and said she was impressed. Howson later went on to produce Coronation Street, and offered Goodyear a six-month contract to reprise her role as Bet, which she took up. She then became a permanent cast member.

After 25 years in the role, Goodyear quit the role in 1995 and the character departed in October that year. According to an interview with Goodyear on Piers Morgan's You Can't Fire Me, I'm Famous, she wanted to leave on a high while the character was still fondly regarded. There was considerable media interest in her departure, with some tabloids speculating that the show might not survive such a high-profile departure. More than 18 million viewers watched Bet's departure.

In the years following Bet's departure, ratings for Coronation Street started to become overtaken by rival soap EastEnders, with long-term viewers complaining that storylines in Weatherfield were becoming increasingly depressing. In 2002, producer Kieran Roberts was keen to help the show return to its original roots and bring back a character from the 'golden era' of the show. Julie Goodyear was offered a one-year contract to reprise the character, and Bet returned to Weatherfield in June 2002 for Betty Turpin's (Betty Driver) retirement party at the Rovers. Offscreen, Goodyear struggled with the increased shooting schedule of the show (which was now producing five episodes per week as opposed to three when Goodyear was last in the series) and, amidst unconfirmed reports of 'diva'-like behaviour, quit after 17 days of filming on the advice of her doctor, who diagnosed her with stress and exhaustion. Goodyear's abrupt departure meant that Bet's storylines had to be concluded off-screen. In November 2003, Bet made her last appearance to date in the show, with a storyline that reunited her with old friend Liz McDonald (Beverley Callard) in Brighton.

In March 2010, it was reported on Digital Spy that Bet was set to make a comeback in an attempt by the newly appointed producer Phil Collinson to try to restore the show to its 'golden days'. However, this was denied the following day by Coronation Street bosses. A spokesperson said, "At the moment there are no plans for Bet to return. The new producer hasn't even started yet, he's not made any decisions." Following the death of Driver in October 2011, there was speculation about Goodyear reprising her role for a one-off episode for Betty's funeral, but the rumours ultimately proved to be groundless, as Bet did not make an appearance.

In April 2018, in an interview with the Daily Star, then producer Kate Oates suggested that Bet could still return to the show if the story fitted.

== Development ==
=== Personality and identity ===
Goodyear described her character as "busty, raunchy, voluptuous; a woman who knew how to flirt and manipulate, and give as good as she got. But she was also vulnerable. Unlucky in love, she could cry.

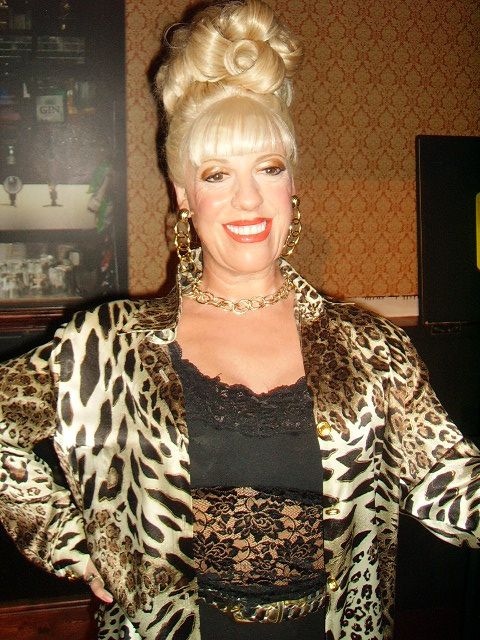
A waxwork of Bet Lynch at the Madame Tussauds in Blackpool

Rejected by those who got nearest to her, she could hurt" and noted that it was this mix that appealed to viewers. She has been described as having a feisty personality and has learned through the hard knocks in her life how to fight her corner, a survivor, somewhat wary of men, she can get her teeth into most things then gives as good as she gets.

=== Appearance ===
Perhaps the character's most remembered looks are the leopard print clothes teamed with the beehive hairstyle. However, throughout her first decade on the show, Bet wore her bleached hair in a variety of different styles (one of which was a beehive). In addition, throughout the 1980s and early 1990s Bet wore shorter bleached blonde wigs. These wigs varied volume and in how realistic they looked. It was made clear onscreen that these were wigs as Goodyear's real hair would occasionally be seen (such as when Bet was disturbed in the middle of the night) and in an episode when a photographer announced he was coming, Bet wondered if she had time to "swill my wig". This is different to other characters on the show where the actor wore wigs for some (or all) of their appearances. It was never implied, for example, that the wigs worn by the actors playing Raquel Watts (Sarah Lancashire), Vera Duckworth (Liz Dawn), Sally Webster (Sally Dynevor), Liz, Blanche Hunt (Maggie Jones), Leanne Battersby (Jane Danson) and Hayley Cropper (Julie Hesmondhalgh) were anything other than their "real" hair (when they were actually wearing wigs for some - or all - of their appearances on the show).

From around 1992, Goodyear's own hair reappeared on a regular basis but with a more elaborate beehive on top - the beehive being a hair piece attached to spare Goodyear's real hair from the intense styling that would have been required. Bet kept this look until her departure in 1995. When Bet reappeared in 2002, she wore a short 1960s-inspired blonde bob wig. This, again, was meant to be a wig onscreen with Bet making jokes about "keeping your hair on" while shaping her wig and being seen with Goodyear's real hair in scenes set at breakfast time (so before Bet had got ready and applied her wig). In her final appearance in 2003, the beehive returned attached to Goodyear's real hair.

Goodyear spoke about how her appearance was shaped in the character's early days, stating: "In the early days I never stopped researching the character of Bet on the streets of Salford with Tony Warren, and every time we went out, we would see a Bet at the market shopping, and either Tony or I would say 'Look at that silver mac/hairdo/earrings.' You could see Bet's everywhere and we took inspiration from each of them. Bet was based on women we saw in real life. As time went by people said 'too much', 'too over-the-top even for Bet', but Tony and I always knew it wasn't, and Bet's fan mail proved us right." She has also said that Bet was always dressed in a 'common as muck way'.

Goodyear has stated on different occasions that she would research the typical salary her character would be on for her barmaid job, as she wanted her character only to appear in outfits that she could realistically afford. This was to make her character credible and believable. This was where the leopard skin style of clothing came from because it was considered naughty, racy and very sexy in her character's early days and was deemed very affordable, staying true to her character.

In a survey published in the Manchester Evening News in April 2007, Bet's beehive was voted the worst haircut in soap history.

Her appearance was also the inspiration for Freddie Mercury's drag character in the music video for I Want To Break Free, by rock band Queen.

== Storylines ==
Bet arrives in Weatherfield in 1966 when working at the PVC factory. She has an affair with her boss John Benjamin and gives Lucille Hewitt (Jennifer Moss) a black eye, because of her jealousy at Lucille's speed of welding. She leaves a few weeks later but returns to Coronation Street in 1970 when she bumps into Irma Barlow (Sandra Gough), remembering her from when she worked with her at the factory four years earlier. Later in the year, Bet becomes a junior barmaid in the Rovers Return Inn, appointed by Billy Walker (Ken Farrington). She has numerous relationships with many people, including well-known Street residents such as Len Fairclough (Peter Adamson) and Mike Baldwin (Johnny Briggs). In April 1975, Bet receives news that her 19-year-old son Martin (Louis Selwyn) (who she gave up for adoption when he was a baby) had died in a car crash in Northern Ireland, where he had been serving as a soldier. She also finds out that he tracked her down, but was disgusted by her overt sexual nature and left without telling her who he was. Bet becomes notable for standing her ground in The Rovers, frequently engaging in verbal spats with the likes of Hilda Ogden, Elsie Tanner and Vera Duckworth.

When Annie Walker (Doris Speed) retires in 1983 after 46 years as landlady of The Rovers Return, her son, Billy, takes over the licence of The Rovers Return. He is involved in various dodgy dealings and screws up frequently. He is the landlord for less than a year; he gets in trouble with the brewery and the tenancy is purchased back by Newton & Ridley. The brewery decides to appoint a manager rather than sell the licence. Sarah Ridley appoints Bet manager after receiving a petition from many of the Street's residents who nominate her for the role. Bet is flabbergasted, but ecstatic. She moves out of the corner shop flat into The Rovers in January 1985. Bet is involved in a fire at The Rovers in 1986, but is saved by Kevin Webster (Michael Le Vell). The place is gutted but eventually refurbished and she moves back in a few weeks later. When the tenancy of The Rovers is being sold by the brewery in 1987, Bet can't raise the money to buy it. Club owner Alec Gilroy (Roy Barraclough) offers her a loan but she can't pay him back so flees to Spain for a few weeks. Alec manages to track her down to bring her back, and then proposes to her. They later marry. The marriage goes better than expected, and Bet falls pregnant in 1988 at the age of 48 (more than thirty years after giving birth to Martin), only to lose the baby in an early miscarriage. Despite their loss, the couple are closer than ever afterwards and continue to work together to make The Rovers a success despite the occasional clashes with the brewery. Bet becomes closer to good friend Rita Fairclough (Barbara Knox) and helps her escape from Alan Bradley (Mark Eden) to Blackpool.

In January 1990, Alec meets his daughter, Sandra Arden (Kathy Jameson), for the first time in twenty years and he meets Sandra's husband Tim and daughter Vicky Arden (Helen Warburton). On Sandra's birthday, Bet overhears Sandra telling Tim she wants nothing to do with Alec. Bet breaks the news to Alec, but he refuses to believe it until Sandra tells him. Bet visits Sandra and talks to her, persuading her to give Alec a chance and after thinking about it, Sandra agrees. In 1991, days after the death of Alec's former wife, Sandra and Tim are killed in a car crash and Vicky (now Chloe Newsome) stays with Bet and Alec, who later become her legal guardians. Bet and Alec look after Vicky while she is on holiday from her private school but become concerned when she starts to become friends with Steve (Simon Gregson) and Andy McDonald (Nicholas Cochrane) who lead her astray. Bet supports Ken Barlow (William Roache), who has become suicidal over his split from wife Deirdre (Anne Kirkbride), and prevents him from overdosing on pills on New Year's Day 1991.

In mid-1992, Alec is offered a job as a cruise manager down in Southampton and suggests to Bet that they sell The Rovers and move down to the south coast. Bet is initially hesitant but eventually agrees to go and Alec sells the pub back to Newton & Ridley. Bet has second thoughts about moving so far away from her friends and the pub and on the morning of departure, visits the new head of Newton & Ridley, Richard Wilmore. Wilmore is reluctant to let Bet remain on as manager and only agrees if she completes a six-month probationary period. The same day, Bet reveals what she has done to Alec who is disgusted with her behaviour and leaves without her. Richard Wilmore frequently visits the Rovers Return and is initially less than happy that Bet is resistant to organising events like Quiz Nights in order to improve revenue but grudgingly agrees to extend her contract after the probationary period is completed. Bet also supports Rita when she marries Ted Sullivan (William Russell) who then succumbs to a brain tumour a few weeks later.

Throughout 1994, Bet enters into a relationship with Charlie Whelan (John Saint Ryan), a long-distance lorry driver whom she meets in December 1993. Bet and Charlie grow closer towards the end of the year, but Charlie later reveals that he has been seeing barmaid Tanya Pooley (Eva Pope) behind Bet's back and they separate. Charlie returns a few weeks later, revealing that Tanya had dumped him in Hamburg but Bet is not interested and they do not reunite. In mid-1995, Vicky announces that she is engaged to Steve. Bet is disapproving of the engagement, believing that Steve is only marrying Vicky to gain access to her trust fund. Bet contacts Alec who returns from Southampton in August but is unsuccessful in trying to stop the wedding. Bet and Alec part ways again, although this time as friends. In October of the same year, Bet receives news from Newton & Ridley that they are selling The Rovers and a number of other pubs in order to focus on more family sized ventures. Bet is unable to raise the money herself to buy The Rovers and first tries to go into partnership with Rita. Despite initially agreeing, Rita later backs out, leaving her friendship with Bet in ruins. Bet's relationship with Vicky also sours when her step-granddaughter refuses to invest in the pub, offering to buy Bet a house instead where she can pay nominal rent. A furious Bet asks Vicky to leave before kicking out all the other customers and telling her staff that she and The Rovers are finished. Bet secretly departs from Weatherfield the same day by taxi. Only Don Brennan (Geoffrey Hinsliff), who she previously had a one-night stand with, is aware of her departure initially before the rest of the street find out.

Bet eventually heads to Tenerife where she spends a few happy years before returning to England. Alec returned to Weatherfield shortly after she left and worked for and with the Duckworths as they took over the pub but eventually sold out to him. While in Tenerife, she meets a man called Bruce and they become lovers. Bruce owns a boat on which the two would spend many happy days together. When he dies suddenly, the boat is left to Bet and she returns to England in 1999, visiting Brighton to make amends with Vicky and sells the boat to invest in Vicky's wine bar.

Bet reappears in Coronation Street in June 2002 for Betty's retirement party, which delights her. Bet reveals that she has made up with Vicky and has been running different pubs across the country for the last seven years, before finally settling in Brighton. Bet quickly makes an impression on the new locals, including Les Battersby (Bruce Jones) who attempts to ask her out, only for Bet to reject him and Steve's new wife Karen, whom she mocks for marrying Steve. Audrey Roberts (Sue Nicholls) asks Bet to stay with her for the next two weeks but when Rita visits, wanting to make amends for not loaning her the money to buy the Rovers, Bet and Rita argue as Bet tells Rita that all she does is run The Kabin, which she has only as a result of Len's death. Rita is offended and tells her that she should leave as she is now bitter but it is later revealed that Bet returned so she could testify against a former lover who stole money from her. Mike and Audrey go to the court to give Bet support but she loses the case and leaves Weatherfield again without saying goodbye.

In November 2003, Bet crosses paths with Liz McDonald (Beverley Callard) in Blackpool. Bet gets involved in Liz's problems as her husband Jim (Charles Lawson) has escaped from prison and is on the run. Bet is also due to marry former Brewery boss Cecil Newton (George Baker), but this does not happen, as he dies of a heart attack on the wedding day. Bet returns to Brighton with Liz, where she continues to run a bar.

== Reception ==
In a 1990 poll ran by Woman magazine, readers voted Goodyear the most popular female soap star, receiving nearly half of the votes. Inside Soap magazine readers voted Bet as "Greatest Ever Landlady". In Dorothy Catherine Anger's book "Other worlds: society seen through soap opera" she brands Bet a "tarty woman" who has the ability to "attract men like bees to honey". In 1998, writers from Inside Soap published an article about the top ten characters they wanted to return to soap. Bet was featured and they described her as "the undisputed Queen of The Rovers Return, a brassy blonde with a smile as broad as a crocodile's and a razor-sharp wit that hid a vulnerable woman who more than anything longed to be loved." In 2017, a writer from Inside Soap commented on how Bet's 2002 return was "much-hyped", adding, "It's always a gamble when you bring back a soap character. Will they still have their old magic?" In a 2021 Radio Times poll, Bet was voted as the third best "soap pub landlord", receiving 8% of the votes.
