= Audrey Roberts =

Fictional character from Coronation Street

- Coronation Street character
- Portrayed by: Sue Nicholls
- Duration: 1979–1982, 1984–2025
- First appearance: 16 April 1979
- Last appearance: 17 November 2025
- Introduced by: Bill Podmore (1979); Mervyn Watson (1984, 1985)
- Spin-off appearances: Coronation Street: Text Santa Special (2013)
In-universe information
- Other names: Audrey Potter
- Occupation: Hairdresser; Councillor; Businesswoman
- Father: Robert Potter
- Mother: Nancy Potter
- Husband: Alf Roberts (1985–1999)
- Sons: Stephen Reid
- Daughters: Gail Platt
- Grandsons: Nick Tilsley; David Platt
- Granddaughters: Sarah Platt
- Aunts: Celia; Ada
- Other relatives: Bethany Platt; Billy Platt; Max Turner (adoptive); Sam Blakeman; Lily Platt; Harry Platt; Harper Platt

Audrey Roberts (also Potter) is a fictional character from the ITV soap opera Coronation Street, played by Sue Nicholls. Audrey made her first appearance on 16 April 1979 and appeared on a recurring basis for three years until April 1982. She returned over two years later in July 1984, before becoming a full-time regular character from 1985.

== Creation ==
=== Casting ===
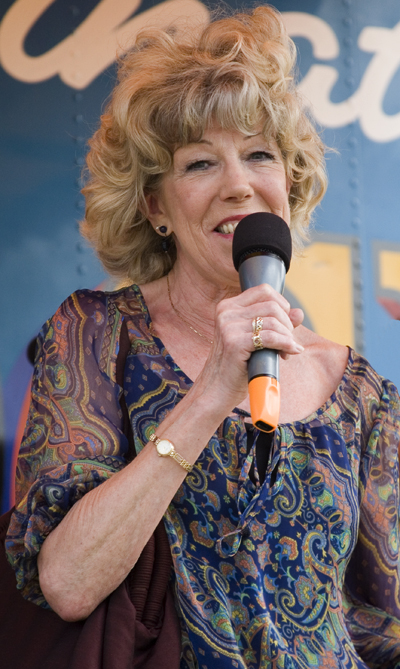
Sue Nicholls (pictured) plays Audrey

The character of Audrey Potter was created as the mother of established character Gail Platt (Helen Worth). After appearing as an occasional character for several years, she became a permanent member of the core cast in 1985. Actress Sue Nicholls auditioned for the part of Audrey Potter and went on to secure the role. At the time the actress had been in many theatre, cabaret and TV roles and was continuing with her career whilst appearing in the show on a recurring basis until she was offered the chance to become a permanent cast member. Audrey made her first appearance in the episode broadcast on 16 April 1979.

In 2010, Nicholls said she found it impossible to believe that she had been with Coronation Street for over 30 years. She commented "It's the best job to have, especially in this day and age when there are no jobs anyway. Everybody wants to be in it so it must have something going for it! I've been so lucky and if I think back over the years all the people have been lovely and the stories have been hot. Being with Amanda Barrie was lovely, and of course Bryan Mosley who sadly died – and it's thanks to Bryan or whoever – if they hadn't married Audrey off to Alf, who knows I might just have been another tart with a heart passing through."

=== Personality ===
Of her character, Nicholls said in 1991 during an interview with Graeme Kay that: "Audrey's not quite as loud and brazen now, I've tried to take her down a bit, which fitted in with the fact that she married Alf, who is quite serious and sombre. Likewise she's brought him up a bit. Some people see in my character things that I don't. I'm stopped all the time by people who say, "Isn't she awful to Alf?" or "Isn't she a cow".

== Development ==
=== Relationship with Lewis Archer ===
In October 2009, actor Nigel Havers joined the cast of Coronation Street as a potential love interest for Audrey. Audrey first meets Havers' character, Lewis Archer, when she attends a ball with Norris Cole (Malcolm Hebden). Audrey is immediately attracted to Lewis, but is frustrated because she is accompanying Claudia Colby (Rula Lenska). Claudia later reveals to Audrey that Lewis is a male escort that charges women for his company. Havers warned that his role of Lewis has a "dark side". Havers commented: "I couldn't resist the idea of doing Coronation Street. I loved the idea of being Audrey's new man. I'm a huge Corrie fan. I started in Corrie a month ago and I'm there until July. I gather my character has a real dark side but I don't know what it is yet."

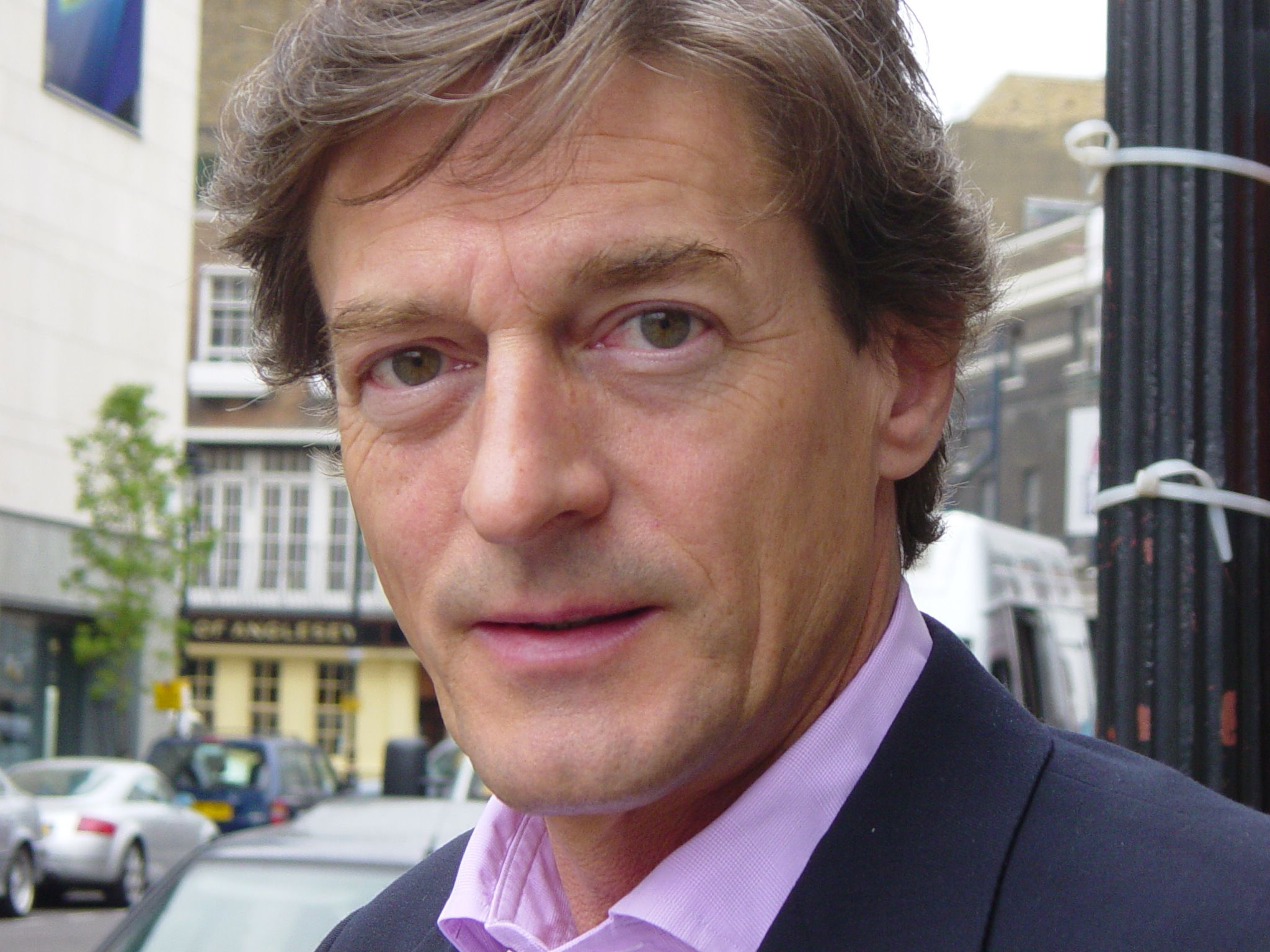
Nigel Havers (pictured) played Lewis Archer

Lewis and Audrey decide to rekindle their relationship in March 2012. Kate White from Inside Soap wrote that Audrey finds Lewis hard to resist, especially after he has apologised for his previous actions. When Lewis is wrongly accused of taking some money from The Bistro, he plans to leave Weatherfield. Nicholls told White that Audrey feels awful that she too accused Lewis and it is a wake up call for her as she does trust him. The actress said Audrey still fancies Lewis and does not want to lose him again. Lewis and Audrey spend the night together and decide to keep their relationship a secret, especially from Audrey's family, as his "past indiscretions still loom over them like a dark cloud". Nicholls said Audrey could be making a mistake, and added, "You read this sort of thing in the papers all the time, women of a certain age being charmed by these men. I'd ask her to think about what she's doing." A writer for Inside Soap said that Audrey and Lewis are very happy as they "bask in the warmth of their revived romance." However, they have to resort to sneaky measures to spend time together to avoid upsetting Audrey's family. When Audrey calls in sick at the salon to spend time with Lewis, Gail and David become concerned and check up on her. They see Lewis leaving her house and realise the pair are back together.

Lewis and Audrey decide to go on holiday together and Lewis offers to pay for himself. Digital Spy's Daniel Kilkelly wrote that Lewis' renewed relationship with Audrey and their plans to go on a round-the-world cruise would cause a feud between her and David. Audrey's money is tied up in the salon, so she asks David to sign it back to her so she can pay for the holiday. However, David refuses to sign the salon back as he thinks Lewis might be planning another fraud. Kilkelly said Lewis tries to play peacemaker and suggests postponing the trip until he can save the money himself, but Audrey insists David will co-operate and she tears up their contract.

=== Family troubles ===
In 2010, when Gail's husband Joe McIntyre (Reece Dinsdale) is found dead, the police suspect that Gail killed him. Nicholls said that Audrey thinks Gail is innocent. She said that Audrey doesn't believe in any way that she killed him but what she does feel is that the whole story has not come out. The death happened in some way that Gail knows about.

There's a bit of the story that hasn't been told and she feels Gail knows but isn't saying. That's where the confrontation in the waiting room stems from. Never, even when I was doing the scene, did I think she was saying, 'Did you kill him?' I think she said, 'There's something wrong – there's a jigsaw piece missing'. I think what she was implying was, 'Did he hit you? Did he attack you and fall over and hit his head?' which is vaguely what happened, but of course Gail thinks she's saying, 'You killed him!' – she wasn't at all but it does come out like that. My big mouth again! [After that] I'm banished from the prison and off I go. Then other things overcome it in the story and I think it happens with Lewis and Nick. I'm sad because it wasn't what I meant at all and I can't go back. David is right off me and blames me for upsetting his mother.

— Nicholls explains Audrey's thoughts on Gail's innocence.

Nicholls said she works very well with Jack P. Shepherd who plays Audrey's grandson David Platt. She commented: "I do love him – he's a splendid actor and I do love having scenes with him. I hope he does with me. We do laugh a lot despite everything. I'm always saying, 'Oh, David!' a bit like Posh Spice! I like the relationship we have. I have met people who have a better relationship with grandparents, in a funny way. I know that sounds a bit strange but sometimes people who are difficult have more of a contact with another generation. David and Gail have never really connected until now." It was announced in April 2012 that Audrey is to suffer a heart attack after weeks of stress trying to get her salon back. Nicholls and writers have worked closely with the British Heart Foundation to help portray the scenes as realistically as possible. Nicholls has also met and spoken to other people who have had heart attacks to extend her research. Nicholls commented "It was important for me to do this right and the British Heart Foundation have been a huge help to me. They kindly put me in touch with some ladies who had suffered similar attacks to Audrey, and it was really useful to be able to speak to them about their experiences."

== Storylines ==
Audrey Potter made her first appearance at daughter Gail Potter's (Helen Worth) 21st birthday party. She meets Gail's fiancé Brian Tilsley (Christopher Quinten) and takes a liking to him. Gail is not too happy to see her mother, although Elsie Tanner (Pat Phoenix) takes a liking to her. Audrey becomes a grandmother in December 1980 when Gail gives birth to Brian's son, Nick Tilsley (Warren Jackson). She continues to return for visits and moves to the street permanently in 1985. As an unmarried mother, Audrey is not considered a suitable match for widowed local councillor, Alf Roberts (Bryan Mosley). With Alf, she gains respectability and a stable life as she has not shown much interest in her daughter. She marries Alf on 23 December 1985, later enjoying the social status of mayoress and believing herself to be better than the other residents. Audrey attempts to revive her career as a hairdresser and persuades Alf to buy the salon from Fiona Middleton (Angela Griffin).

Over the years, Audrey mellows from a social climber to a more sympathetic character. The existence of her other child, Stephen Reid (Todd Boyce), who she gave up when she was 16, is revealed some years later. She is heartbroken by Alf's sudden death in 1999 but throws herself into work and stands for council herself, retaining her seat until 2001. In 2000, Audrey becomes a great-grandmother when her 13-year-old granddaughter, Sarah Platt (Tina O'Brien), gives birth to Bethany. Audrey initially is angry at Sarah and scolds her but later apologises and is supportive. Audrey is devastated when her best friend, Alma Halliwell (Amanda Barrie), dies of cervical cancer in June 2001.

Audrey nearly becomes a victim of her serial killer son-in-law, Richard Hillman (Brian Capron), when he discovers that she has inherited quite a lot of money from Alf. In late 2002, viewers saw him subtly make Audrey fear that she is developing senile dementia by deliberately unlocking doors she had locked, hanging out washing that she does not remember, turning on lights and dropping a dress off to be dry-cleaned. Finally, he tries to kill her in a house fire, made to look like the result of her dementia, with the battery removed from the fire alarm. However, Steve McDonald (Simon Gregson) rescues her. After Audrey's employee and friend Maxine Peacock (Tracy Shaw) is murdered in January 2003, Audrey suspects Richard is responsible and urges Gail to leave him, fearing for her and the children, Sarah (Tina O'Brien) and David Platt's (Jack P. Shepherd), safety but Gail will not listen. Audrey challenges Richard at Maxine's funeral, accusing him of her murder, much to the mourners' indignation but Ken Barlow (William Roache) believes her, suspecting that chief suspect Aiden Critchley (Dean Ashton) is innocent. Archie and Norris Cole (Malcolm Hebden) are also suspicious of Richard's dealings with his elderly clients. In March 2003, Gail learns the truth and Richard tries to kill himself, Gail and her children by driving them into the canal. Gail and her children are rescued but Richard drowns. Afterwards, Audrey and Gail reconcile.

In October 2006, Audrey speaks to her close friend, Fred Elliott (John Savident), just as he is due to marry Bev Unwin (Susie Blake) and tells him that she wishes she was marrying him. This upsets Fred and gives him doubts, but he decides to go ahead. Audrey tells Ashley Peacock (Steven Arnold) that she will not be at the wedding so Fred borrows Bev's car to visit her. After a heart-to-heart, Fred collapses in the hall and dies. Audrey, accompanied by the police, tells Ashley and his wife, Claire (Julia Haworth). Later that year, Audrey makes friends with Bill Webster (Peter Armitage). However, on Christmas Day 2006, Bill's wife Maureen (Sherrie Hewson) arrives and learns that Bill has been having an affair with Audrey. Bill and Maureen return to Germany but he leaves Maureen and moves in with Audrey, deciding to try to make a go of their relationship. David also moves in after Gail kicks him out. Stephen visits and offers David a job in Italy but changes his mind after Audrey finds drugs in his drawer at the salon. Sarah, her daughter Bethany (Amy & Emily Walton) and Jason Grimshaw (Ryan Thomas) go instead but after learning Sarah planted the drugs, Jason refuses to go so Sarah and Bethany go alone. Eventually, Audrey becomes annoyed with David, especially after discovering he pushed Gail down the stairs during an argument and is stunned when Gail will not press charges, and still has a reticent relationship with David.

In 2008, Audrey is contacted by Ted Page (Michael Byrne), Gail's father. He does not know about their daughter, so Audrey meets him and tells him that he has a family. He is surprised, but has a surprise of his own – he is gay. In August, Audrey returns from a booze cruise in France with Bill, Janice Battersby (Vicky Entwistle) and Roger Stiles (Andrew Dunn). Audrey did not enjoy the trip, feeling that Bill ignored her. Bill has been drinking so Audrey drives. While driving, Audrey and Janice begin arguing and Janice accuses her of being a fortune hunter and not caring about Alf or Fred. Audrey is furious, even more so when Bill does not defend her. The argument causes Audrey to crash the car and she injures her arm. Disgusted with Bill, she ends their relationship and asks him to move out.

Audrey bumps into an old friend, Claudia Colby (Rula Lenska), at a function and is introduced to her dinner partner, Lewis Archer (Nigel Havers). Claudia later tells Audrey that Lewis is an escort and she should give him a call. Audrey, having become smitten with Lewis, contacts him and begins seeing him occasionally. In April 2010, Audrey is not pleased to see Lewis out with Rita Sullivan (Barbara Knox), which leads to the two women having a bitter argument over Lewis. Later that month, Audrey discovers Lewis's black book with details on all his clients. She is deeply hurt to see that she is no more than a paying customer to him, but when he assures her that he has fallen for her too, she responds to his kiss and they become a couple. Approaching her 70th birthday, Audrey toys with the idea of retirement, as she wants to settle down with Lewis. At her birthday party in The Rovers, she argues with Gail when she discovers that Lewis was an escort. Annoyed with Gail, Rita and Claudia's interference, Audrey announces that she has found happiness with Lewis. Audrey then decides to purchase a Greek hotel with Lewis and emigrate, much to the amazement of her family and friends. However, it soon emerges that Lewis is a conman after he steals £4000 from the bookies. On the day of their departure, Lewis' deception is revealed after he is caught kissing Deirdre Barlow (Anne Kirkbride) and placing fake betting slips in the cash register on CCTV. Lewis flees the country with the money, leaving Audrey humiliated and heartbroken. Audrey is shocked to discover that Claudia's boyfriend, Marc Selby (Andrew Hall), is a transvestite when she picks him up from a police station after he is assaulted. Marc begs her not to tell Claudia and Audrey agrees. However, Claudia mistakenly believes that Audrey and Marc are having an affair which leads to Marc telling Claudia about his transvestism.

At a doctor's appointment, Audrey learns that she and Gail have high blood pressure, caused by too much alcohol, and they decide to cut down and exercise more. Whilst exercising in the countryside, they are horrified to bump into Lewis in a country pub. He runs away when he sees them and they report Lewis to the police. Lewis later goes to Audrey's salon and tells her he did not mean to hurt her. He asks Audrey to drive him to the police station to prove how sorry he is. In a bid to win her over, Lewis sends her flowers and Audrey goes to his address and finds he is living in a bedsit. Gail disapproves when Audrey's grandson Nick (now Ben Price), gives Lewis a job as a waiter but Audrey defends Lewis and he later buys her a bracelet as a thank you. Audrey professes her love for Lewis and asks him to stay. They spend the night together and agree to keep their relationship secret but when Audrey fakes illness so she can spend the day with Lewis, David and Gail visit to check she's okay and see Lewis there. Audrey insists that it is her life and throws them out but Gail insists that if Audrey does not leave Lewis, then she does not want to speak to her ever again. Deciding to go on around the world on a cruise with Lewis, Audrey attempts to regain full control of the salon from David. David and his wife, Kylie Platt (Paula Lane), are reluctant to agree to this as they believe Lewis to secretly conning Audrey again and David does not want to lose his inheritance. During a heated argument, Audrey collapses and suffers a heart attack, brought on by stress. She spends several days in hospital but is released and told to take things easy, which she does. When David tries to speak to her, she ignores him and he gets the message relatively quickly, though she does eventually forgive him.

Audrey discovers that Gail and Gloria Price (Sue Johnston) are testing Lewis about whether he really is a changed man. The plan is that Gloria will pretend to be dying and offer a Lewis large amount of money in her will if he leaves Audrey for her. Audrey is shocked and angry but goes along with the plan anyway since even she doubts Lewis slightly. Lewis passes the test and Audrey is smugly delighted. However, when Lewis discovers the truth and confronts Gail, it's clear to Lewis that Audrey knew about the plot, leaving Lewis heartbroken at Audrey's betrayal. Lewis leaves Audrey horrified when he reveals that he was planning to propose to her and he walks out. She calms down when she is reassured by Gail and the family that Lewis would forgive her, especially after being forgiven for his own previous deeds. Audrey is panicky when she returns home and sees that Lewis has packed his things and left. Audrey desperately tries to explain to Lewis but he cannot forgive her and he dumps her. The next day, Audrey furiously tells Gail and Gloria that their meddling has resulted in her losing Lewis. Over the next few months, Lewis plans his revenge. Though Gloria and Gail feel the wrath of Lewis' vengeance, Audrey does not as he still loves her. However, Gail is conned by Lewis when he dupes her into thinking that he loves her after she develops feelings for him. He manages to hack her bank account and then tells her and the rest of her family, in a video message, that he has conned her and fled the country, before telling Audrey that none of this was meant to hurt her and that he still loves her.

In 2018, Audrey and Maria fall out due to creative differences in the salon. Audrey then wins a Hairdressing Achievement award but is unhappy that Claudia nominated her, leading her to throw flowers at her due her acceptance speech. Lewis re-enters Audrey's life and they begin another relationship, which upsets Gail. Lewis plans to propose but dies of a heart attack, leaving Audrey heartbroken. Audrey then faces further heartbreak when her money is stolen, and she feels betrayed when she finds out that Nick is the culprit and that David used the money to buy his own barber shop. She reports them to the police but slowly forgives them.

In June 2022, Audrey suffers from alcohol dependency. As a result she has an accident at the salon and gets trapped underneath a motorbike. In August 2022, Audrey ends up in hospital after an attempted suicide by overdose of sleeping pills.

Since November 2025, Audrey has been spending time away to go and see her daughter Gail and her husband Jesse Chadwick in France.

== Reception ==
Sue Nicholls won the award for "Best Comedy Performance" at the 2000 British Soap Awards. At the 2003 British Soap Awards, Sue Nicholls won gongs for "Best Dramatic Performance" and "Hero of the Year" for her role in the highly successful Richard Hillman storyline which ran between 2002 and 2003.

In 2019, Sue Nicholls won the “Outstanding Achievement Award” at the British Soap Awards.

In 2024, Chloe Timms from Inside Soap wrote that Audrey is a "real treasurer" when she is being a friend.

== In popular culture ==
Impressionist Francine Lewis performed an impression of Audrey Roberts in the seventh series of Britain's Got Talent. In recent years, some attention has been focused on the 'Audrey Roberts noise' following a viral video created by Martyn Hett, which compiled numerous times Audrey was seen to complete a question with an audible 'Hmm?'. The noise was then dubbed onto the song "I Don't Like It, I Love It" by Flo Rida and Robin Thicke, and played on Radio 1 numerous times by Nick Grimshaw.
