= Colin Welland =

British actor and screenwriter (1934–2015)

- Born: Colin Edward Williams; 4 July 1934; Liverpool, England
- Died: 2 November 2015 (aged 81); Surrey, England
- Occupations: Actor, screenwriter
- Years active: 1962–1998
- Spouse: Patricia Sweeney (m. 1962)
- Children: 4

Colin Welland (born Colin Edward Williams; 4 July 1934 – 2 November 2015) was an English actor and screenwriter. He won the BAFTA Award for Best Actor in a Supporting Role for his performance as Mr Farthing in Kes (1969) and the Academy Award for Best Original Screenplay for writing Chariots of Fire (1981).

== Early life ==
Welland was born Colin Edward Williams at the Maternity Hospital in Liverpool (Note: Welland's birthplace was erroneously given as Leigh in obituaries and on IMDb until the correct information was discovered a few days after his death.) on 4 July 1934, the son of Norah and John "Jack" Arthur Williams. He spent his earliest years in the Kensington district of Liverpool before moving to Newton-le-Willows in 1941. He passed his eleven-plus in 1945 and attended Newton-le-Willows Grammar School, and, after his National Service, he studied at Goldsmiths College and Bretton Hall College of Education. He gained a teaching diploma and qualified as a teacher, then taught art at Manchester Road Secondary Modern school in Leigh, where he was known as "Ted" because of his Teddy Boy curly hairstyle. He began his stage career as an actor and assistant stage manager at Manchester Library Theatre.

== Career ==
As an actor, Welland appeared as PC David Graham in the BBC series Z-Cars from 1962 to 1965. He was a sympathetic schoolteacher in a BAFTA-winning performance in the film Kes (1969), and a detective in the Richard Burton film Villain (1971). He appeared as a villain in one 1975 episode of The Sweeney, and was in the series' first cinema spin-off Sweeney! (1977) as Frank Chadwick, a newspaper editor. His other appearances include Dennis Potter's Blue Remembered Hills (1979) as the character Willie, and Dancin' Thru the Dark (1990) as the nightclub manager. He was also in the television series Cowboys (1980), a comedy about a dodgy builder, with Roy Kinnear. He co-presented Sport Two on BBC 2, with Ian Wooldridge, in the early 1970s.

Welland's screenwriting credits include the Granada TV play, Roll on Four O’Clock (1970) in which he also appeared as a member of the teaching staff; the teleplay about the strike for equal pay Leeds United (1974), the film Yanks (1979), starring Vanessa Redgrave and Richard Gere, which was directed by John Schlesinger, and Twice in a Lifetime (1985), starring Gene Hackman, Ellen Burstyn and Ann-Margret.

When Welland appeared on BBC Radio 4's Desert Island Discs in 1973 he said that most of his own plays "usually champion the individual against the system". He said: "I usually find that it's one man's effort to break through what is usually expected of an individual."

Welland won the award for Best Original Screenplay for Chariots of Fire (1981) at the 1982 Academy Awards, and his acceptance speech included the phrase: "The British are coming!" (a quotation from Paul Revere). In the film Chariots of Fire, the sign outside the Church of Scotland in Paris shows the preacher for the 9 am worship to be "C.M. Welland"; he had played a vicar in Straw Dogs (1971). Following Chariots of Fire, he was again commissioned by David Puttnam to write the screenplay for War of the Buttons (1994).

== Personal life ==
Welland married Patricia Sweeney in 1962, and they had a son and three daughters together.

Welland was a lifelong rugby league fan and player who wrote of his support for the sport in newspaper columns. He stood up for rugby league against rugby union discrimination in the 1980s and 1990s.

== Death ==
Welland died in his sleep at a nursing home in Sunbury on Thames on 2 November 2015, at the age of 81. He had suffered from Alzheimer's disease for several years before his death.

On his death, Chariots of Fire producer David Puttnam said Welland was "an unswervingly good man; a fine actor, and a seriously gifted screenwriter". Nigel Havers, who had appeared in the film, told BBC News: "I remember him being great fun with a great sense of humour and a very honest man. He had a tremendous honesty about everything he wrote. I'm just very surprised he never made more films in Hollywood. It's a great loss to us all." Z Cars co-star Brian Blessed described Welland as "a great writer and a very natural actor," adding "He had a tremendous ability for writing. He could write anything, any style."

== Selected credits ==
| Year | Title | Role | Notes |
|---|---|---|---|
| 1969 | Kes | Mr. Farthing | |
| 1971 | Villain | Tom Binney | |
| 1971 | Straw Dogs | Rev. Barney Hood | |
| 1976 | Play for Today Your Man from Six Counties | | Co-Writer with Barry Davis |
| 1977 | Sweeney! | Frank Chadwick | |
| 1981 | Chariots of Fire | | Writer |
| 1985 | Twice in a Lifetime | | Writer |
| 1989 | A Dry White Season | | Co-writer with Euzhan Palcy |
| 1990 | Dancin' Thru the Dark | Bransky's Manager | |
| 1994 | War of the Buttons | | Writer |
