= Lynne Perrie =

English actress and singer

- Perrie in The Ghost of Ivy Tilsley (1996)
- Born: Jean Dudley; 7 April 1931; Rotherham, England
- Died: 24 March 2006 (aged 74); Maltby, England
- Occupations: Actress, singer
- Years active: 1956–2004
- Spouse: Derrick Barksby (m. 1950)
- Children: 1
- Family: Duggie Brown (brother)

Lynne Perrie (born Jean Dudley; 7 April 1931 – 24 March 2006) was an English actress, singer and television personality, best known as Mrs Casper in Ken Loach's 1969 film Kes, Mrs Petty in the television series Queenie's Castle, and as Ivy Tilsley in Coronation Street.

== Early life ==
Perrie was the second of four children; a brother, Victor, died before she was born. Her younger brother was actor Duggie Brown.

Perrie attended Rotherham Girls High School after passing her 11-plus. After leaving school, she trained as a dispenser at Boots. She later abandoned her studies to concentrate on her singing career. By the age of 14, she had started singing in working men's clubs under the stage name of 'Dizzy' with a local dance band for six shillings (6/-) (30p) on a Saturday night.

== Singing career ==
An early publicity shot of Lynne Perrie

In 1956, Perrie entered showbusiness professionally as a singer and comedian, after performing at the Rotherham Trade Centre and receiving a further 27 bookings. She decided to give up her factory work and go into cabaret full-time.

Throughout the 1960s Perrie was often billed and referred to as "Little Miss Dynamite", due to her vibrant personality and performance. In her capacity as a singer, she appeared throughout the British Isles working in variety, clubs, and concerts, including eight at London's Royal Albert Hall. In 1964, she supported the Beatles for fifteen concerts, during a six-week tour at coastal resorts on Sundays. Other stars she shared the same bill as included the Rolling Stones, Sacha Distel, Rod Stewart and the Faces, Engelbert Humperdinck and Shirley Bassey.

As her popularity in England grew, Perrie began performing in other countries. She toured South Africa seven times and also visited Germany, Paris, Australia and the United States. In her book, Secrets of the Street, Perrie recalled how she had made headlines during her first tour of South Africa. She wrote, "[I performed in] a concert down the impressive Cango Caves. A recording of the concert was released over there. I made history as the first female to perform so far underground."

From 1963 to 1968, Perrie made several television appearances as a guest artiste, notably on the popular ITV Stars and Garters variety show, with Kathy Kirby, and The Good Old Days, the BBC's long-running light entertainment programme.

Despite later concentrating primarily on acting, Perrie still continued to perform her variety act in the clubs when she joined Coronation Street full-time. In her book, she revealed that she sang on the first night of Peter Stringfellow's Hippodrome 'Gay Evening' in London, adding: "I always had a loyal gay following – and the lesbians loved me too!"

By this time, she was also often asked to work as a compere. Terry Dobson, a member of the pop band Black Lace, recalled a time in 1977 in his book: "Lynne Perrie was in and out of her dressing room, a change of costume between every act, not that much time, two songs, some six or so minutes and she was on the stage again, bring off the act, then introducing the next ... brilliant, and very professional; you could tell she had been doing this sort of thing for years."

As well as on the stage, Perrie also continued to sing occasionally on television, notably on a UK charity telethon in 1990, in which she performed an original song called "Ships that Pass in the Night".

== Acting career ==
=== Early career ===
Perrie made her acting debut as Mrs. Casper in the 1969 film Kes, even though she had no formal acting training.

The success of Kes led to Perrie's television career. She appeared in early episodes of several popular television shows, including children's serials Follyfoot and The Intruder, long-running courtroom drama series Crown Court, and sitcom The Cuckoo Waltz.

Perrie's first regular television role was in the popular Yorkshire TV comedy series Queenie's Castle, written by Keith Waterhouse and Willis Hall. The sitcom starred Diana Dors, with Perrie in second female lead playing her arch-enemy Mrs Petty, the busy-bodying residents' association secretary with conservative values. Queenie's Castle was first broadcast on bonfire night in 1970 and ran for three series over two years, with the final episode being broadcast in September 1972. Eighteen episodes were made, with Perrie appearing in nine of them.

=== Coronation Street ===
Perrie's role in Kes ultimately led to her getting the part of Ivy Tilsley in the soap opera Coronation Street in 1971. The show's casting director Paul Bernard had seen her in the film, and cast her without audition. She first appeared as a minor character, but the producers were sufficiently impressed with her performance to offer her a more substantial role. She became a recurring character from 1972, and was later promoted to the main cast in 1979 when the character moved into Coronation Street with her family – husband Bert (Peter Dudley) and son Brian (Christopher Quinten). The character became infamous for her interfering and acid tongue, earning her the tabloid nickname "Poison Ivy".

On 5 February 1994, without consulting her Coronation Street bosses, Perrie had cosmetic surgery that involved having tissue from her backside injected into her mouth, to supposedly gain fuller lips. The results were unflattering, and Perrie was sacked from the show by producer Carolyn Reynolds after twenty-three years as Ivy. Perrie denied that she had been fired for having cosmetic surgery, claiming that she felt that her character had simply run its course and leaving was her decision. Her final episode aired in March 1994, and the character was killed off off-screen in August the following year.

Perrie's new image was widely ridiculed by the media, something she would later regret. In 2003, by which time she had retired, she was interviewed on ITV's Facelifts From Hell programme in which she said: "Everyone was laughing and calling me fishface. I couldn't go anywhere without the cameras following me. I don't think plastic surgery is an answer to it all, you've got to be happy with yourself."

=== Other works ===
She also appeared in two television plays written by Colin Welland, who had appeared with her in Kes. The first, 1970's Slattery's Mounted Foot, saw her playing a pub regular. In 1974 she starred as the pivotal role of a militant union leader in the BBC Play For Today factory drama Leeds United. Upon Perrie's death, director Roy Battersby praised her work and wrote in an obituary letter to The Guardian newspaper: "The bravura of the performance by Lynne Perrie was, and remains, glorious".

In 1976, she played Cora in Riding South in the BBC2 Centre Play Showcase series, and appeared alongside Phil Daniels, Warren Clarke, Michael Elphick and Kenneth Haigh in ITV Sunday Night Drama in 1977.

Perrie turned down the role of Mrs Shenton in John Schlesinger's wartime romance Yanks in 1978, after she was given the option of a regular contract with Coronation Street. However, she still appeared in the film, as a speaking face in the crowd. She was credited simply as 'Woman at Railway Station'.

In 1991, Perrie appeared in a celebrity edition of Family Fortunes, in a team with Gorden Kaye, Buster Merryfield, June Whitfield and Paul Shane.

=== Later career ===
Following her dismissal from Coronation Street, Perrie had a cameo in Mike Reid's cult adult pantomime video Pussy in Boots as Poison Ivy, and presented the programme Clairvoyants for ITV's The Tuesday Special slot.

In 1994, Perrie released her controversial autobiography Secrets of The Street. The book became a bestseller, and was met with mostly positive reviews from the tabloid press. The book contained behind the scenes information about Coronation Street, and admissions of feuds with several of her co-stars during her time on the show. Granada TV attempted to ban its publication, and Perrie had to attend court over the attempted injunction.

After the publication of her book, she continued to appear as a guest on a variety of chat shows, including Channel 4's The Word, where (amongst other acts) she performed her own rendition of Gloria Gaynor's "I Will Survive". The performance was voted by the public as number 62 on Channel 4's list of 100 Greatest TV Moments from Hell, and was repeated on Channel 4's 2001 series The Best of the Word. Perrie ended the year by performing alongside John Inman in a lavish production of Mother Goose at Stockport.

In 1995, she starred in the VHS Lynne Perrie's Alternative Workout, a parody of an exercise programme, in which she appeared in a series of short comedy sketches, which generally consisted of her helping toned, athletic young men out of their workout clothing. The video was a commercial failure, and deleted just two years after its release.

Perrie continued to cause controversy, particularly when she appeared on the adult channel Television X. On one of the shows, she was seen pulling down a young stripper's thong, proceeding to lick his revealed penis. In a 2004 TV interview, she addressed her appearance by stating "I never knew that the channel that I went on was called the X Fantasy Channel," and how she was encouraged by the people involved on the show to do what she did. Presenter James Whale said: "The producers of the show shouldn't really have put an elderly woman into that situation."

By 1996, Perrie had returned to the stage with a new cabaret act, and found regular work as an after-dinner speaker, which she did alongside television chat show appearances. There were various reports at the time that Perrie was set to make a television comeback as an actress, in a six-part drama to be filmed in Spain. The idea of the series was later dropped. She did visit Spain towards the end of the year to perform the Frank Sinatra hit "My Way" at a televised concert. In October of the same year, Perrie was the subject of a Channel 4 documentary entitled The Ghost of Ivy Tilsley, part of a series of programmes exploring the dark side of fame. In the film, Perrie was seen looking through newspaper cuttings and packing mementos of her career into cardboard boxes as she prepared to leave her mock Tudor house in Salford. She had decided to return to Yorkshire to live with her husband and care for her son with HIV. Perrie claimed that after leaving Coronation Street she had realised that fame was not important, stating: "I didn't really want the fame to start off with. But gradually as you get it, it's like taking drugs. The more you get, the more you want". After the programme was broadcast, Perrie appeared on the 'Ladies Night' special of BBC2's celebrity quiz show Shooting Stars, which was notable for her being drunk live on air. On Christmas Day 1996, she starred in an advert for Pepsi, which was part of a series of six humorous commercials in the style of The Word, which had been axed the year before. She was seen walking down the aisle to marry a monkey at the altar.

In 1997, Perrie was reunited with her screen son Christopher Quinten when both actors appeared in an episode of BBC Radio 4 sitcom Harry Hill's Fruit Corner. At the same time, her health was poor and was deteriorating further, leaving her unable to perform. She made her last television regular appearance on the ITV daytime chat show Afternoon Live before retiring.

Perrie claimed towards the end of her life that her health was improving. She told various journalists at the time that she was planning on making a comeback. However, in keeping with what friends described as her manic depressive character, such a comeback never materialised.

Towards the end of her life, Perrie took up work as a celebrity bingo caller in Blackpool. She also made the occasional television appearance, the last of which were two entries in Channel 5's 'Greatest' countdown series (both in 2004), Greatest TV Soap Moments, presented by her friend Mike Reid, and Greatest Embarrassing TV Moments.

Perrie's life and work were acknowledged at the British Academy Television Awards in 2006.

== Personal life ==
Perrie married carpenter Derrick Barksby (1 December 1929 – 17 January 2015) on 14 October 1950 and gave birth to her son Stephen John Barksby on 14 May 1951. Her terminally ill son came to prominence in the 2000s campaigning for assisted suicide. Stephen died on 1 April 2016, aged 64. In her biography, Perrie admitted that she had had several affairs in the course of her marriage. Unbeknownst to the public, for most of her working life she and Barksby had lived separately. Barksby chose to live alone in their Yorkshire home whilst Perrie took up residence in Salford to film Coronation Street. After a few public separations, Perrie insisted in 1996 that she and Barksby were back together for good.

Perrie suffered intermittent health problems, including a heart attack and a cancer scare. After learning that her son had been diagnosed with AIDS in 1994, Perrie started to suffer from depression. She said: "Any mother will understand the pain but for me it was much worse. He was my only child and we went through this under the spotlight of publicity." During her retirement in 2000, the Daily Mirror newspaper spoke to Perrie, and in an interview she revealed that she was still suffering from bipolar disorder, as well as memory loss, and had recently spent ten weeks in a psychiatric hospital.

At various stages of her life, Perrie was addicted to tranquillisers, and suffered serious side-effects from slimming pills. She admitted to once being addicted to gambling, and confessed that she had "blown" more than £250,000 over the years on one-armed bandits. Abuse of alcohol was another problem, and her heavy drinking eventually earned her the nickname "Champagne Perrie". She said: "Although I polished off pints of the sauce ... I was not an alcoholic; I just had no inhibitions."

Perrie died in Maltby, South Yorkshire aged 74, on 24 March 2006, four months after suffering a stroke.

== Selected credits ==
=== Acting ===
Year	Title	Role	Notes
1969	Kes	Mrs Casper	
1970	Slattery's Mounted Foot	Dotie Donaghue	
1970–1972	Queenie's Castle	Mrs Petty	9 episodes
1971–1972, 1974–1994	Coronation Street	Ivy Tilsley	Regular role; 1,167 episodes
1971	Follyfoot	1st Bystander	
1972	The Intruder	Mavis	
1974	Leeds United	Mollie	
1975	The Cuckoo Waltz	Mrs Truscott	
1976	Riding South	Cora	
1977	A Good Human Story	Mrs. Gibbs	
1978	Crown Court	Carol Lawley	
1979	Yanks	Woman at Railway Station	
1994	Pussy in Boots	Poison Ivy	VHS

=== Self ===
Year	Title	Notes
1963–1964	Stars and Garters	Singer
1968	The Good Old Days	Singer
1986	Des O'Connor Tonight	
1987	Children in Need	Singer
1989	Fight Cancer	Presenter; 6 episodes
1989	Kazuko's Karaoke Klub	
1990	Telethon	Singer
1991	Family Fortunes	Contestant
1994	The Chrystal Rose Show	
1994	The Tuesday Special	Presenter
1994	The Word	
1995	Lynne Perrie's Alternative Workout	VHS
1996	Tales of the Supernatural: Volume 1 – The Circle	VHS
1996	The Very Famous Paul Ross Show	
1996	Cryer's Crackers	
1996	GMTV	
1996	The Ghost of Ivy Tilsley	Documentary
1996	Shooting Stars	
1996	Pepsi Countdown to Christmas	TV Commercial
1997	Harry Hill's Fruit Corner	
2003	Facelifts From Hell	Documentary
