= Liz Dawn =

English actress (1939–2017)

Liz Dawn MBE
- Dawn as Vera Duckworth in 2007
- Born: Sylvia Ann Butterfield; 8 November 1939; Leeds, West Riding of Yorkshire, England
- Died: 25 September 2017 (aged 77); Whitefield, Greater Manchester, England
- Occupation: Actress
- Years active: 1960s–2015
- Known for: Role of Vera Duckworth in Coronation Street (1974, 1976–2008, 2010)
- Spouse(s): Walter Bradley (m. 1957; div. 1959) Donald Ibbetson (m. 1965)
- Children: 4
- Awards: British Soap Award for Best On-Screen Partnership (2001, Coronation Street, with Bill Tarmey); British Soap Award for Lifetime Achievement (2008, Coronation Street)

Sylvia Ibbetson (born Sylvia Ann Butterfield; 8 November 1939 – 25 September 2017), known professionally as Elizabeth Dawn or Liz Dawn, was a British actress, best known for her role as Vera Duckworth in the long-running British soap opera Coronation Street. First starting on the serial in 1974, she had a recurring role as a factory worker until her husband, Jack (played by Bill Tarmey), first appeared in 1979. She played the character of Vera for 34 years. For her role in the soap, she received the Lifetime Achievement Award at the 2008 British Soap Awards. She was also appointed an MBE in the 2000 Queen's Birthday Honours.

== Career ==
Sylvia Ann Butterfield was born in Leeds, West Riding of Yorkshire, to parents Albert and Annie Butterfield. She grew up on the city's Halton Moor estate and began her performing career as a nightclub singer. By the late 1960s, Dawn had ventured into acting, often taking small parts in television programmes as well as advertisements. One commercial for Cadbury's biscuits proved popular and helped her gain notice. During the 1970s, she appeared in supporting roles in programmes including All Creatures Great and Small and Colin Welland's television play Leeds United (1974) and several other episodes of the Play for Today series in the mid-1970s.

Dawn first appeared in Coronation Street in 1974. She had a recurring role as a factory worker until her husband, Jack (played by Bill Tarmey), first appeared in 1979.

Dawn made several appearances in the Granada Television daytime series Crown Court. Initially in an un-credited role of a prison officer, in 1975 she played the character of Bedelia Conroy, a public house licensee and witness in a deception trial. She was the subject of a This is Your Life episode in 1989, when she was surprised by Michael Aspel on the set of Coronation Street.

Following a diagnosis of emphysema in March 2004, on 22 July 2007, Granada Television (makers of Coronation Street) announced that Vera Duckworth was to be written out, at Dawn's request, before Christmas, because of further complications with the condition.

Dawn's final appearance came in the episode screened on 18 January 2008, when Vera Duckworth died in her sleep, thus ending 34 years of the character's appearances in the series. Bill Tarmey, who played on screen husband Jack Duckworth, continued to be a part of the cast of Coronation Street and Dawn stated that the hardest thing about leaving Corrie was saying good-bye to Tarmey, with whom she was best friends. On 8 November 2010, she made a brief one-off return to the soap for the final scenes of her on-screen husband, Jack, who died in the same chair as Vera. Dawn appeared as Vera's spirit, who had come to take Jack on his final journey and the pair enjoyed one final dance together.

She came out of retirement in December 2015 to make a one-off guest appearance in the soap Emmerdale as the character Mrs Winterbottom.

Dawn was appointed an MBE in the 2000 Queen's Birthday Honours, for services to the Manchester Children's Hospital, the Genesis Appeal and the Liz Dawn Breast Cancer Appeal, St. James's Hospital, Leeds.

Dawn won the British Soap Award for Outstanding Achievement at the 2008 ceremony for her decades-long portrayal of her fictional character Vera Duckworth.

== Personal life and death ==
At the age of 18, Dawn married Walter Bradley in Leeds in 1957 and the couple had a son, Graham, but the marriage collapsed when she turned 21. She married electrician Donald Ibbetson in 1965, with whom she had three daughters, Dawn, Ann and Julie. At the time of her death, she had six grandchildren and three great-grandchildren.

In March 2004, Dawn was diagnosed with emphysema (chronic obstructive pulmonary disease – COPD). She attributed the illness to her own smoking habit and performing in smoke-filled clubs. In May 2009, Dawn agreed to become the "Celebrity Ambassador" of the British Lung Foundation (BLF). She also worked to raise awareness of COPD. In June 2009 she spearheaded the campaign "Breathe Easy Week", to raise awareness of the work of the BLF.

In 2013 she revealed her health had deteriorated further after she had a heart attack, and only a third of her lungs were still working. In September 2017 Dawn was admitted to hospital in Manchester with severe breathing problems. Dawn, who had stopped smoking in 2002, had previously said her emphysema had taken such a toll on her that she had nearly collapsed during her appointment as an MBE at Buckingham Palace in 2000.

Dawn died on 25 September 2017, at her home in Whitefield, Greater Manchester, after suffering with COPD for a long time. Her funeral took place at Salford Cathedral on 6 October 2017.

== Tributes ==
Tributes after Dawn's death came from many Coronation Street actors, celebrity fans, and the Labour MP Tracy Brabin, a former Coronation Street actress, who told BBC News, "She was a legend and an icon, an incredible person to work with. Deeply authentic, a natural comedian and a heart as big as Manchester."

Dawn's name is one of those featured on the sculpture Ribbons, unveiled in 2024.

== Filmography ==
Year	Title	Role	Notes
1972, 1974	Coronation Street	Rovers Customer/ Onlooker	Uncredited; 3 episodes
1972–1975	Crown Court	Female Officer/ Warder/ Bedelia Conroy	20 episodes
1973–1975	Play for Today	Striker Enid	Episodes "Leeds United" "Kisses at Fifty"
1973	Shabby Tiger	Hotel Lady	Uncredited
1974	Village Hall	Other Voter	
1974	Sam	Sylvia Brightside	
1974, 1976–2008, 2010	Coronation Street	Vera Duckworth	Regular role; 2,275 episodes Won: 2001 British Soap Award for Best On-Screen Couple (shared with Bill Tarmey); 2008 British Soap Award Lifetime Achievement Nominated: 2008 Television and Radio Industries Club Award for TV Soap Personality; 1999 British Soap Award for Best On-Screen Partnership (shared with Bill Tarmey)
1975–1976	The Wheeltappers and Shunters Social Club	Waitress	7 episodes
1975	Sunset Across the Bay	Canteen Lady/ Striker/ Mrs Warboys/ Enid	
1975	Greenhill Pals	May	TV film
1976	Open All Hours	Woman Outside Shop	Uncredited
1978	Z-Cars	Rose	
1978	Selwyn	Mavis	
1979	All Day on the Sands	Derek's mother	TV film
1990	This is Your Life	Herself	Guest of Honour
1990	ITV Telethon	Vera Duckworth	Charity telethon
1997	Coronation Street: Viva Las Vegas!	Vera Duckworth	Direct-to-video Coronation Street spin off
2001	Lily Savage's Blankety Blank	Herself	
2012	Coronation Street: A Christmas Corrie	Vera Duckworth	
2015	Emmerdale	Mrs Winterbottom	Guest role; 2 episodes
