= Christopher Quinten =

British actor (born 1957)

- Born: Christopher Bell; 12 July 1957 (age 69); Middlesbrough, England
- Occupation: Actor
- Years active: 1978–present
- Spouses: Leeza Gibbons (m. 1989; div. 1991) Paula Holmes (m. 1992, separated)
- Partner(s): Alison Slater; Robyn Delabarre (2019–present)
- Children: 2

Christopher Quinten (born Christopher Bell; 12 July 1957) is a British actor, best known for his role as Brian Tilsley on Coronation Street, which he played from 1978 to 1989.

== Career ==
Quinten started his career as a dancer in West End productions, including the Victoria Palace with Cilla Black and Jimmy Tarbuck. He turned to acting and had his first role in the 1978 film International Velvet, starring Tatum O'Neal. This appearance led to small parts in television series including Quatermass and Hazell and was also noticed by the Coronation Street casting offices, who gave Ivy Tilsley, the oft-seen Baldwin's worker, a son. Quinten was then signed to the programme, for which he worked for over a decade. His pairing with Gail Potter (played by Helen Worth) proved very popular for the serial in the 1980s.

In 1989, Quinten told the casting office that he was going to move to the United States to marry his fiancée, American talk show host Leeza Gibbons. The couple had met in 1988 in New Zealand while appearing on a Telethon and Quinten had been hoping to stay in Coronation Street as a part-time character, but the producers rejected his offer to stay on part-time. At the end of 1988 the decision was made to kill the character off. His final episode was aired on 15 February 1989, when Brian Tilsley was stabbed to death by a gang of teenagers outside a nightclub. Once settled in the United States, Quinten and Gibbons worked together on the film RoboCop 2 (in which he played a reporter).

Quinten returned to Britain and appeared on various chat shows. In 1994, he played Mr. Barraclough in an episode of the ITV comedy series Surgical Spirit. In 1998, it was reported that he was now touring the country with a one-man comedy rock act, and was also working as an after-dinner speaker. In 2000, he briefly returned to television acting with a guest role in the BBC soap opera Doctors.

Quinten has had a long career in pantomimes. In 2010 he played Abanazar in the Consett Empire's production of Aladdin, and Ramsbottom in Snow White and the Seven Dwarfs at Oswaldtwistle Civic Theatre in 2011.

He appeared in Peter Kay's "Sit Down for Comic Relief" sketch alongside Rustie Lee & Bob Carolgees. In 2016 it was reported that Quinten now works at Stringfellows erotic nightclub in London. In April 2020, he appeared in an episode of Hollyoaks as Mark Kelly, father of regular character Kyle Kelly, played by Adam Rickitt who previously also played Quinten's onscreen son Nick Tilsley in Coronation Street.

== Personal life ==
Quinten was married to American talk show host Leeza Gibbons from 1989 to 1991 when they divorced. They had a daughter Lexi Quinten together in 1989. Quinten married Paula Holmes in 1992, but they later separated. With partner Alison Slater (ex-Stringfellow's dancer), he has a daughter Sydney (b. 2005). In August 2005, Quinten was accused and charged with rape. Following his trial in June 2006, he was unanimously found not guilty by the jury. On 10 June 2019, Quinten became engaged to his dancer girlfriend, Robyn Delabarre, on her 21st birthday.
