= The Incredibly Strange Film Show =

British talk show

- Title card of the Show
- Created by: Channel X Productions
- Starring: Jonathan Ross
- Country of origin: United Kingdom
- Original language: English
- No. of series: 2
- No. of episodes: 12

Production
- Running time: 40 minutes

Original release
- Network: Channel 4
- Release: 5 August 1988 – 27 October 1989

The Incredibly Strange Film Show is a series of documentaries presented by Jonathan Ross focusing on the world of "psychotronic" or B movies.

Each episode was focused on the lives of filmmakers like Herschell Gordon Lewis, Sam Raimi, Doris Wishman, Ed Wood Jr, Jackie Chan and many other notable filmmakers who had their own unique style of filmmaking and have made contributions to the world of cinema. Various movie genres, including such outré types as Mexican wrestling and Hong Kong horror films, were also examined.

The series' first episode featured interviews filmed at the Senator Theater, in Baltimore, during the premiere of Hairspray, including an interview with John Waters and one of the last recorded interviews with Divine.

The show was originally aired on 5 August 1988 on Channel 4. A second series, entitled Son of The Incredibly Strange Film Show, aired the following year. Both series aired in the US on the Discovery Channel in the early 1990s. The show was followed by Jonathan Ross Presents for One Week Only, which featured filmmakers including Alejandro Jodorowski and David Lynch.

== Episodes ==
=== Season 1: The Incredibly Strange Film Show ===
Episode	Featured Filmmaker	Air Date
1	John Waters	5 August 1988
2	Ray Dennis Steckler	12 August 1988
3	Herschell Gordon Lewis	19 August 1988
4	Ted V. Mikels	26 August 1988
5	Russ Meyer	2 September 1988
6	Sam Raimi	9 September 1988

=== Season 2: Son of The Incredibly Strange Film Show ===
Episode	Featured Filmmaker	Air Date
1	Jackie Chan	22 September 1989
2	Fred Olen Ray & Doris Wishman	29 September 1989
3	The Legend of El Santo	6 October 1989
4	Ed Wood Jr.	13 October 1989
5	Tsui Hark & Stuart Gordon	20 October 1989
6	George A. Romero & Tom Savini	27 October 1989

== Reception and legacy ==
Film studies academic Dean DeFino described the show as "highly regarded". The Baltimore Sun called it "strangely engaging".

Director Edgar Wright claimed that the episode on Sam Raimi inspired him to become a filmmaker.

== Book ==
The Incredibly Strange Film Book, a spin-off written by Ross, was published in 1993.
