= Jack Barth =

American screenwriter and author (born 1956)

- Occupations: Screenwriter, author, television writer, producer
- Writing career
- Language: English
- Genres: Film, television, magazines
- Notable work: Yesterday

Jack Barth is an Anglo-American writer. He has written for film, television, books and magazines, and is also a television producer. He is best known for creating the story that was the basis for the 2019 film Yesterday and his claim that Richard Curtis falsely took credit for key elements of Barth's original screenplay, "Cover Version." Prior to Yesterday, Barth had written 25 unproduced screenplays over 40 years. At age 62, he might also have been the oldest person ever to see a first feature screenplay produced, with the previous oldest first-time screenwriter believed to have been Raymond Chandler, at age 56.

A former editor of the Stanford Chaparral, Barth also wrote The Simpsons episode "A Fish Called Selma". He wrote and produced several series for British television that were presented by Jonathan Ross, including Americana, Japanorama and Asian Invasion. His books include Roadside America (co-written with Doug Kirby, Ken Smith and Mike Wilkins), American Quest, Roadside Hollywood, Roadside Elvis and Sold Short, a look at fraud in the American stock markets as seen through the eyes of the notorious short-seller Manuel P. Asensio.
