= Asian Invasion =

2006 television mini-series

Asian Invasion is a three-part mini-series presented by Jonathan Ross which aired on BBC Four in January 2006. Focusing on East Asian cinema, the series looked at some of the most famous films, actors and directors in Japan, Korea and Hong Kong. The series was directed by Rod Edge and written and produced by Jack Barth.

== Episode 1 - "Japan" ==
Episode 1 first aired on 10 January 2006. It features interviews with Mamoru Oshii and Ryuhei Kitamura and a brief history of Japanese cinema, as Ross builds up to his primary focus of modern Japanese cinema.

== Episode 2 - "Hong Kong" ==
Episode 2 first aired on 17 January 2006. In this instalment Ross meets comedy legend Stephen Chow and director Derek Yee, discusses the career of Michelle Yeoh and hails the illustrious careers of martial arts legends Jackie Chan and Bruce Lee.

== Episode 3 - "Korea" ==
Episode 3 first aired on 24 January 2006. Featuring interviews with directors Park Chan-wook and Kim Ki-duk, a look at Korea's burgeoning film industry and also a retrospective with regard to North Korean film making efforts.
