= Martha Ross =

British actress and radio presenter (1939–2019)

- Born: 24 March 1939
- Died: 14 January 2019 (aged 79); Hitchin, Hertfordshire, England
- Occupations: Actress and radio presenter
- Spouse: Tony Phillips (m. 1992)
- Children: 6, including Jonathan and Paul

Martha Ross (24 March 1939 – 14 January 2019) was a British actress and radio presenter.

== Family ==
Ross had six children, including television presenters Jonathan and Paul Ross. She married actor Tony Phillips in 1992.

== Career ==
Ross worked as an extra in EastEnders from its inception until November 2006, when her contract was terminated because she told her son Paul an EastEnders Christmas storyline, which he leaked on his LBC radio show.

She also appeared in Grange Hill, The Sean Hughes Show, Space Virgins and Barrymore, and hosted a current affairs show on Liberty Radio. Ross wrote a weekly agony aunt column for Real People magazine. She appeared in many theatre roles, including The Last Game, Atlantis, The Firm's Big Night Out and Stained Glass.

In her later years, she lived in Hitchin, Hertfordshire.
