= A Fish Called Selma =

- The Simpsons episode
- Episode no.: Season 7 Episode 19
- Directed by: Mark Kirkland
- Written by: Jack Barth
- Production code: 3F15
- Original air date: March 24, 1996

Guest appearances
- Phil Hartman as Troy McClure; Jeff Goldblum as MacArthur Parker

Episode features
- Couch gag: The Simpsons are five malfunctioning wind-up dolls who buzz their way to the couch.
- Commentary: Bill Oakley; Josh Weinstein; Jeff Goldblum; David Silverman

Episode chronology
| ← Previous "The Day the Violence Died" | Next → "Bart on the Road" |
- The Simpsons season 7

"A Fish Called Selma" is the nineteenth episode of the seventh season of the American animated television series The Simpsons. It originally aired on the Fox network in the United States on March 24, 1996. The episode features Troy McClure, who tries to resurrect his acting career and squelch the rumors about his personal life by marrying Selma Bouvier. Show runners Bill Oakley and Josh Weinstein were fans of Phil Hartman and wished to produce an episode that focused on his character McClure. Freelance writer Jack Barth wrote the episode, and Mark Kirkland directed it.

Barth's script underwent a substantial rewrite in the show's writing room, including the expansion of the Planet of the Apes musical and addition of the song "Dr. Zaius". The episode ran too long because of the slow pace of Troy and Selma's speech. Consequently, guest star Jeff Goldblum rerecorded his dialogue as MacArthur Parker at a faster speed.

The episode received generally positive reviews, with particular praise given to Hartman's performance and the musical sequence. Entertainment Weekly placed the episode eighth on their list of the top 25 The Simpsons episodes.

== Plot ==
Chief Wiggum stops Troy McClure for reckless driving and notices his driver's license requires him to wear corrective lenses. Because of his vanity, Troy dislikes wearing his glasses. He visits Selma Bouvier at the DMV and offers to take her to dinner if she lets him pass the eye test. After dinner, paparazzi photographers see Troy leaving with Selma and the story hits the news. After winning for him the role of George Taylor in a musical stage adaptation of Planet of the Apes, Troy's agent, MacArthur Parker, says that Troy can stage a career comeback if he continues seeing Selma. On his agent's advice, Troy asks Selma to marry him and she agrees.

The night before the wedding, a drunken Troy tells Homer that he does not love Selma and is only using her as a sham wife to further his career, with Homer only casually informing Marge after the fact (despite ample opportunity at the wedding to declare it). Marge and Patty try convincing Selma her marriage is a sham, but she accuses them of jealousy. She confronts Troy, who shamelessly admits that their marriage is a sham but claims she has everything she could want and will be "the envy of every other sham wife in town". Selma has her doubts but agrees to remain married to Troy because she fears being alone.

Parker thinks he can get Troy the part of McBain's sidekick in McBain IV: Fatal Discharge if he sires children. Troy and Selma prepare to conceive a child, but Troy is uncomfortable sleeping with her; rumors of his unconventional sexuality once squelched his career and prevented his comeback. Selma decides that bringing a child into a loveless marriage is wrong and leaves Troy. A tabloid TV show confirms that Troy has turned down the role of McBain's sidekick to direct and star in his own film, The Contrabulous Fabtraption of Professor Horatio Hufnagel, produced by 20th Century Fox.

== Production ==
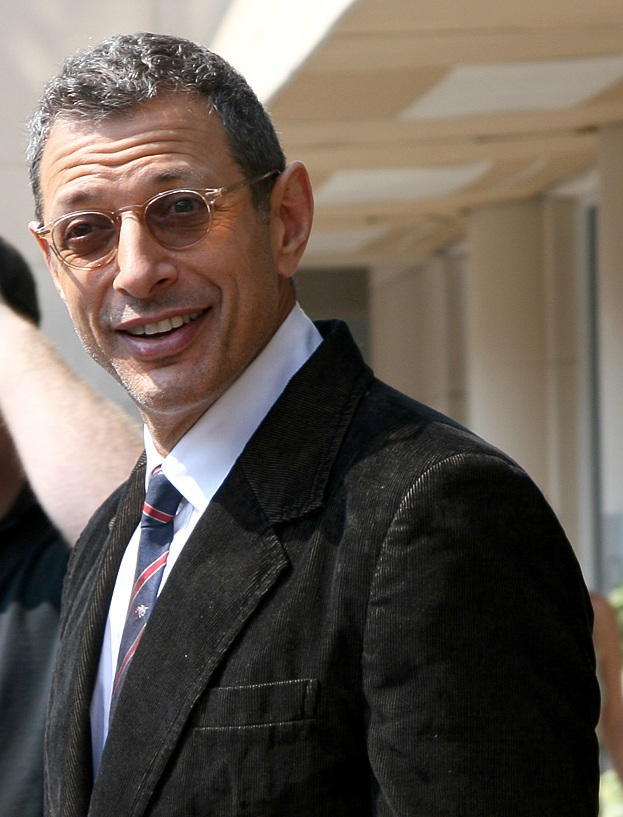
Jeff Goldblum had to rerecord his dialogue as agent MacArthur Parker because the episode ran too long.

Show runners Bill Oakley and Josh Weinstein were fans of actor Phil Hartman, who had been a recurring guest star in The Simpsons since the second season. They decided to produce an episode entirely about his character Troy McClure to give Hartman as much to do as possible. Oakley wanted to explore Troy's character because he had never interacted with the show's other characters before, only appearing on television. The writers chose the plot idea of Troy's marriage to Selma Bouvier because she was "always marrying people". The episode's first draft was written by freelance writer Jack Barth, although the rest of the writing staff rewrote it.

One aspect of the rewrite was the song "Dr. Zaius" from the Planet of the Apes musical, which the staff consider to be one of the greatest musical numbers ever written for The Simpsons. The two songs in the musical were composed by Alf Clausen, who had worked as a copyist on the original film of Planet of the Apes. Weinstein—who had not seen the film at the time—pitched it in the writers' room as "Rock Me Dr. Zaius", in parody of the 1985 song "Rock Me Amadeus" by Falco. It expanded into a full song primarily concocted by George Meyer, who included "corny" aspects of vaudeville. The line "From chimpan-A to chimpan-Z" in the final song of the musical was written by David X. Cohen. Oakley commented that he has heard the line "all over the world". Several of the staffers have commented on how writing the Planet of the Apes parody generated a great deal of enthusiasm in the writer's room: Oakley described it as "one of those rare bursts of creative brilliance. A lot of the things that people remember and love on The Simpsons were horrible late-night grinds, whereas this was just a magic visit from the joke fairy."

Director Mark Kirkland was pleased that Troy was the star of the episode; he enjoyed interpreting Hartman's voice performance because it allowed him and the other animators to "open [McClure] up visually as a character". Due to the slow talking speed of Troy and Selma, the episode's audio track was 28 minutes long, which meant that multiple scenes had to be cut, including Troy's bachelor party. After the cast had completed their original recording, guest star Jeff Goldblum rerecorded his dialogue as MacArthur Parker at a faster speed to further shorten it. His character's design was loosely modeled on him, as well as a real-life "sleazy Hollywood agent". The animators watched several of Goldblum's films, including The Tall Guy, in order to get a better representation of his performance.

Throughout "A Fish Called Selma", it is hinted that Troy engages in paraphilia. The writers initially did not know what the "unsavory" sexual preference would be, but eventually decided on a fish fetish, a suggestion from executive producer James L. Brooks, since it was "so perverted and strange that it was over the top". At the episode's table reading, an attendee exclaimed that the line, "from now on, she's smoking for two" has "got to go" from the script; however, her request was denied. On the walls of the Pimento Grove restaurant, the animators placed caricatures of every single guest star who had appeared on the show up to that point, as well as pictures of the fictional celebrities of the show.

== Cultural references ==
The episode's title is a reference to the film A Fish Called Wanda, while the opening scene features a parody of The Muppets. McClure appears in a musical version of Planet of the Apes; the song "Dr. Zaius" is a parody of "Rock Me Amadeus" by Falco. Marge calls Troy McClure a perfect gentleman "like Bing Crosby and JFK". The musical's title—Stop the Planet of the Apes. I Want to Get Off!—is a reference to the stage show Stop the World – I Want to Get Off. The scene with Selma and Troy smoking is similar to Now, Voyager. The house that McClure lives in is based on the Chemosphere in California, seen in Brian de Palma's Body Double. Troy McClure's car is a DeLorean. McClure being pulled over is a reference to when Johnny Carson was arrested for drunk driving in his DeLorean in 1982. The showbusiness news anchors, voiced by Hank Azaria and Pamela Hayden, are based on Entertainment Tonight hosts John Tesh and Mary Hart, respectively.

McClure describes Jub-Jub the iguana as "Everywhere You Want to Be" in reference to a Visa commercial. Ken Keeler pitched the name MacArthur Parker, in reference to the song "MacArthur Park", written by Jimmy Webb and first recorded by Richard Harris. When learning of one possible acting gig being a Paramount-made buddy comedy involving Hugh Grant and Rob Lowe, McClure yells "Those sick freaks!?", in reference to the sex scandals that the two actors were involved in at the time. Selma's costumes are modeled on the clothes of Marilyn Monroe. At the wedding, Homer sings "Rock and Roll Part 2" by Gary Glitter in his head. The rumours of Troy McClure having a bizarre fetish for marine life mirror sex rumours about Richard Gere and a gerbil. Troy's star on the Hollywood walk of fame replaces Buster Keaton's.

== Reception ==
In its original broadcast, "A Fish Called Selma" finished tied for 66th place in the ratings for the week of March 18–March 24, 1996, with a Nielsen rating of 7.8. It was the sixth-highest-rated show on the Fox network that week.

In 2021, Entertainment Weekly placed the episode fifth on their list of the top 25 The Simpsons episodes. Empire, in 2004, called the episode the "high point" of the show's "long-standing love affair with The Planet of the Apes", and cited it as McClure's "finest hour". In 2006, IGN named the episode the best of the seventh season, stating that it seemed the "obvious pick". They called the musical the best moment of the episode and "maybe even the whole show". In a 2008 review, IGN's Robert Canning praised Phil Hartman's performance as "simply the best of any guest appearance on The Simpsons". He concluded by saying: "Sure, [the episode's] writing is smart and the jokes are funny, but without Phil Hartman as Troy McClure, 'A Fish Called Selma' would only be good. With Hartman, it's fantastic!"

Also in 2006, Kimberly Potts of AOL Television named the episode the 14th best episode of the series. Dave Foster of DVD Times praised the episode in his 2006 review, as well as Jeff Goldblum's participation on the audio commentary. He stated: "for those yet to witness Troy McClure's musical take on Planet of the Apes, well, you might say you haven't lived! Musical parody at its very best, the visuals and aural delights in this one brief sequence guarantee this season a recommendation being one of the most inspired moments of The Simpsons many seasons."

In 2012, Johnny Dee of The Guardian listed it as one of his five favorite episodes in the history of The Simpsons, writing: "Key to The Simpsons longevity is the minor characters who only crop up every season or so. And none more so than Troy McClure." Gary Russell and Gareth Roberts, the authors of the book I Can't Believe It's a Bigger and Better Updated Unofficial Simpsons Guide, were pleased that "Troy McClure gets a starring role at last". The Simpsons is strongest when the characters’ relatable humanity is highlighted by the show’s series of absurdities and laugh-out-loud funny moments. This episode is a perfect example of the relationship between these two sides of The Simpsons: How can you go from 'Dr. Zaius' to choking up at two once-again solitary characters at the end of the same half-hour? That’s what makes 'A Fish Called Selma' such a legendary episode, truly one for the ages.”
