= Paul Ross =

English television and radio presenter (born 1956)

- Born: 31 December 1956 (age 69); Romford, Essex, England
- Occupations: Television/radio presenter; journalist; media personality
- Years active: 1987–present
- Children: 5
- Mother: Martha Ross
- Family: Jonathan Ross (brother)

John Paul Ross (born 31 December 1956) is an English television and radio presenter, journalist and media personality.

He is the son of Martha Ross and the elder brother of Jonathan Ross.

== Early life ==
Growing up in outer east London, Ross was educated at Norlington School for Boys in London, and later read English at the University of Kent. Realising he would not be able to follow the academic career he favoured, "an English lecturer at a polytechnic", he commenced training as a journalist at the University of Exeter and subsequently started his career with the Western Times in Exeter in 1982.

== Career ==
=== Television ===
Ross became a researcher at London Weekend Television before becoming an editor for The Six O'Clock Show and The London Programme. He worked as the series editor on series 3 and 4 of Channel 4's magazine style programme The Word, and became executive producer for series 5.

His first job as a TV presenter was on the current affairs show Eyewitness, which ran for two years and saw him filming in Sicily, the United States, Brazil and Russia. He also fronted the police appeals show Crime Monthly for ITV.

His onscreen break came in 1993 with Channel 4's The Big Breakfast, on which Ross worked first as a reporter and then as a studio presenter.

In 1995, Ross was chosen as the presenter of the game show Jeopardy!, which had been recently taken over by Sky One. In the same year, he presented episodes of The Big Breakfast, the ITV series Big City and Good Sex Guide Abroad.

In April 1996, he presented the celebrity-based television show The Very Famous Paul Ross Show for The Family Channel, in which he interviewed performers Adam West, Lynne Perrie and Cannon and Ball. In September of the same year, he teamed up with Sarah Greene to launch a Sky One afternoon chat show called 1 to 3, aimed primarily at women with a mix of movies, music, celebrities, topical information, lifestyle and entertainment.

In January 1997, Ross presented the first episode of All Over the Shop, his celebrity-based panel game show based on consumer issues. The programme, broadcast on BBC One ran for three series until July 1999, by which time 85 episodes had been made. A critic on Gameshow.com gave All Over the Shop positive remarks by saying: "For an early morning slot, this was quite a perky little show, a fact that must have been recognised due to its spin-off programmes." That same year Ross fronted Endurance UK, the UK's equivalent of the cult Japanese show Za Gaman for the Challenge TV channel, and it was commissioned for a second series the following year. Ross also presented the game show, Tellystack for UK Gold. In 1997 he presented his late night entertainment programme The Paul Ross Show, broadcast on ITV, which again saw a second series transmitted in 1998.

In 1999, Ross was again playing quizmaster when he presented the game shows Mind The Gap, transmitted on ITV, Life's a Punt for LIVE TV, A Slice of the Action for Carlton Food Network, and the celebrity quiz It's Anybody's Guess, which was commissioned for 40 episodes in the Carlton London region.

In 2000, he presented a television game show for Living TV called Mystic Challenge.

In October 2001, Ross appeared as a guest on BBC Two's comedy panel show Never Mind the Buzzcocks. The following month he returned to his role as presenter with No Win, No Fee, a new game show for BBC One. The show was broadcast from 29 October 2001 to 29 August 2003, with three series and 70 episodes made.

Ross presented Most Haunted Live! for Living TV from the May 2006 live event in Portsmouth until Most Haunted Live ended on Living TV in March 2010. Ross also hosted on the shopping channel Bid TV, where he was one of its original faces when it first launched in October 2000.

Ross appeared regularly as a showbiz correspondent on This Morning. He also contributes regularly on The Alan Titchmarsh Show, and occasionally on the Channel 5 show Big Brother's Bit on the Side.

=== Radio ===
By the late 1990s, Ross had worked as a presenter for GLR, Virgin Radio and, later, Talk Radio.

Ross also presented a radio show for LBC but left in early 2008, to present the Breakfast Show on BBC London 94.9, initially with JoAnne Good till January 2010 when Good was given her own late night show The Late Show with Joanne Good. From January 2010 Gaby Roslin co-presented with Ross till January 2013, when schedule changes took place and Penny Smith, former GMTV presenter was announced as his new co-presenter. Since they have been presenting BBC London 94.9 Breakfast show, its listenership, according to RAJAR increased by 99,000 in the first quarter of 2014.

From 2008 to 2011 he also presented a show on Saturday mornings on BBC Sussex and BBC Surrey (formerly BBC Southern Counties Radio).

In addition to his Breakfast show with Penny Smith on BBC London 94.9, since late 2013 Ross has been presenting the Saturday mid-morning show on BBC Radio Berkshire, 8 am till 11 am.

In November 2006, he caused controversy by announcing an upcoming EastEnders Christmas storyline on his LBC show, causing his mother, Martha Ross, who told him about the storyline, to be sacked from her job as an extra on EastEnders.

Ross broadcast Paul Ross Full Set Breakfast from 6–10 am on talkRADIO, a new talk radio station which launched on 21 March 2016. In January 2018, as part of schedule changes to the station, Ross moved to overnights in the earlier time of 1–5 am. He left talkRADIO in September 2019 to join sister station Talksport, presenting in the same overnight timeslot. This continued to be simulcast on talkRADIO until the launch of the new schedules in April 2022.

=== Other appearances ===
Ross was the first contestant to be eliminated on 2003's Comic Relief Does Fame Academy after his singing failed to impress the public voters.

In 2004, Ross presented a series of DVD programmes focusing on the news and fashions of the three decades before the 1990s. The first, 1960's Flashbacks was released on DVD on 16 August.

Ross appeared on a celebrity edition of Mastermind, choosing "The Life and Works of Ezra Pound" as his specialist subject.

He appeared in the film Bridget Jones's Diary as "Mr Sit-up Britain".

He also lost two stone on ITV's Celebrity Fit Club, won the top prize on an episode of All Star Family Fortunes, which was donated to the Alzheimer's Society, and performed as Tommy Steele on Stars in Their Eyes.

In 2011, he took part in a celebrity episode of The Chase, where he won £25,000 for Children with Cancer UK.

In January 2014, Ross participated in the second series of the celebrity diving show Splash! on ITV. He was eliminated in the second heat.

== Personal life ==
Ross has been married three times and has five children and two grandchildren. He lives near Tring in Hertfordshire. In 2014, Ross said that he had developed an addiction to mephedrone over the previous year and had an affair with a male English teacher. His wife stood by him.
