= In Search of Steve Ditko =

- Created by: Hot Sauce
- Starring: Jonathan Ross
- Country of origin: United Kingdom
- No. of episodes: 1

Production
- Running time: 60 Minutes

Original release
- Network: BBC Four
- Release: 16 September 2007

In Search of Steve Ditko is a BBC Four documentary. It was first shown on Sunday 16 September 2007.

The documentary is part of the Comics Britannia season. It follows Jonathan Ross' attempts to track down comics artist Steve Ditko, the comics artist best known as the co-creator of Spider-Man, Doctor Strange, and many other characters.

== Overview ==
The programme featured interviews with comics creators, editors and others including Jerry Robinson, John Romita Sr., Neil Gaiman, Joe Quesada, Ralph Macchio (comics), Flo Steinberg, Alan Moore, Mark Millar, Stan Lee, and Cat Yronwode.

Ross, accompanied by Gaiman, met Steve Ditko at his New York City office but he declined to be photographed or interviewed for the show. However, he gave the two a selection of some of his old comic books. At the end of the show Ross said he had since spoken to Ditko on the telephone and was now on first name terms with him.

== Reception ==
Comics historian Peter Sanderson said of the documentary:

A knowledgeable comics aficionado, Ross infuses the documentary with his passion for Ditko and American Silver Age comics. The show has an amazing roster of interviewees ... Wittily and intelligently written, without a trace of condescension towards comics, this program is a model of what documentaries about comics should be like.
