= Americana (1992 TV series) =

Documentary series by Jonathan Ross

- Genre: Documentary
- Narrated by: Jonathan Ross
- Country of origin: United Kingdom
- Original language: English
- No. of episodes: 3

Production
- Running time: 3 hours (3 1-hour-long episodes)

Original release
- Network: Channel 4
- Release: 12 December 1992

Americana is a 1992 British documentary series which was presented by Jonathan Ross, co-written with Jack Barth. The three-part series explored American culture and was aired on Channel 4 from 12–26 December 1992. The titles of the three editions were "Fat", "Dumb" and "Rich".
