= Yesterday (2019 film) =

Film by Danny Boyle

- Theatrical release poster
- Directed by: Danny Boyle
- Screenplay by: Richard Curtis
- Story by: Jack Barth; Richard Curtis
- Produced by: Tim Bevan; Eric Fellner; Matthew James Wilkinson; Bernard Bellew; Richard Curtis; Danny Boyle
- Starring: Himesh Patel; Lily James; Joel Fry; Ed Sheeran; Kate McKinnon
- Cinematography: Christopher Ross
- Edited by: Jon Harris
- Music by: Daniel Pemberton
- Production companies: Perfect World Pictures; Working Title Films; Decibel Films; Dentsu Inc.
- Distributed by: Universal Pictures
- Release dates: 4 May 2019 (Tribeca); 28 June 2019 (United Kingdom and United States)
- Running time: 116 minutes
- Countries: United Kingdom; United States
- Language: English
- Budget: $26 million
- Box office: $154.6 million

Yesterday is a 2019 romantic comedy film directed by Danny Boyle and written by Richard Curtis, based on a story by Jack Barth and Curtis. It stars Himesh Patel as a struggling musician who enters an alternative present in which he is the only person who remembers the Beatles, and becomes famous performing their songs. The film also stars Lily James, Joel Fry, Ed Sheeran, and Kate McKinnon.

Production on Yesterday was first reported in March 2018. Filming began in April around England, particularly Norfolk and Halesworth in Suffolk. Photography also took place at Wembley Stadium, the Principality Stadium, and in Los Angeles. The filmmakers paid $10 million for the rights to use the Beatles' music. Although none of the Beatles were involved, Boyle received approval for the project from them or their families.

Yesterday premiered at the Tribeca Film Festival on 4 May 2019, and was released in the UK and the US on 28 June by Universal Pictures. It received mixed reviews and grossed $154.6 million worldwide on a production budget of $26 million.

== Plot ==
Jack Malik is a struggling singer-songwriter from Lowestoft who plays gigs to tiny audiences. His manager and childhood friend Ellie Appleton, a mathematics teacher, encourages him not to give up on his dreams. Jack is hit by a bus during a 12-second global power failure.

After recovering from the accident, Jack sings the Beatles's song "Yesterday" for his friends, who are all impressed and assume he wrote it. He quickly discovers that they have never heard of the Beatles, much to his astonishment. Searching for the Beatles on the Internet, Jack finds nothing, discovers the band's records missing from his collection, and realises that he is now living in a parallel universe where the Beatles have never existed.

Jack begins performing Beatles songs, passing them off as his own. Ellie has him record a demo with Gavin, a local music producer. Following a performance on local television, Jack is invited by singer Ed Sheeran to play as his opening act in Moscow. Ellie has a parents' evening scheduled, so declines to join him; instead, Jack's friend and roadie Rocky travels with him.

After the gig, Jack plays "The Long and Winding Road" to defeat Ed in a songwriting duel. In Los Angeles, Ed's ruthless manager Debra Hammer signs Jack to her label and engineers his rise to global fame. Ellie confesses that she has always been in love with him at his going-away party prior to moving to Los Angeles.

Jack starts recording an album at EastWest Studios, but he cannot remember the lyrics for "Eleanor Rigby". Hoping to trigger memories, Jack goes to the Beatles' hometown of Liverpool, visiting landmarks such as Strawberry Field, Penny Lane, and the grave of Eleanor Rigby. Ellie joins him in Liverpool, and they share a drunken evening and kiss, but she tells him that she is not interested in a one-night stand.

The next morning, Jack and Rocky pursue Ellie to Liverpool Lime Street railway station, where she congratulates him. However, she tells him that she cannot be a part of his celebrity life. Heartbroken, Jack returns to Los Angeles and is desperate to have an ordinary life again, while Ellie begins dating Gavin.

The record label prepares to launch Jack's debut album, but they reject his title ideas—taken from Beatles albums—and name it One Man Only. Jack persuades them to launch the album with a rooftop concert in Gorleston-on-Sea. There, two people who also recall the Beatles approach him backstage. They tell Jack that they know that he did not write the songs, but thank him anyway, having feared that the Beatles' music was gone forever.

They give him the address of a 78-year-old John Lennon, who never became a star in this reality. Jack visits Lennon, who has lived a long, happy life out of the public spotlight with his wife. Lennon advises Jack to pursue the one he loves and always tell the truth.

Jack calls in a favour with Ed Sheeran, who arranges for him to join him onstage at Wembley Stadium. He confesses to the crowd that he did not write the music and that he loves Ellie. Jack has Rocky upload the songs free on the internet, sabotaging the record release and enraging Debra. He and Ellie return to her home and finally are intimate. In the morning, Jack equates his feelings for Ellie with how Harry Potter must have felt when he defeated Lord Voldemort. Ellie asks "Who?". They start a family, and Jack becomes a music teacher.

== Cast ==
- Himesh Patel as Jack Malik
- Lily James as Ellie Appleton
- Joel Fry as Rocky
- Ed Sheeran as himself
- Kate McKinnon as Debra Hammer
- Sanjeev Bhaskar as Jed Malik
- Meera Syal as Sheila Malik
- Harry Michell as Nick
- Sophia Di Martino as Carol
- Sarah Lancashire as Liz, a Liverpudlian woman who remembers the Beatles
- Alexander Arnold as Gavin
- Ellise Chappell as Lucy
- Karl Theobald as Terry
- Justin Edwards as Leo, a Russian man who remembers the Beatles
- Lamorne Morris as head of marketing

James Corden and Michael Kiwanuka appear as themselves, and Robert Carlyle makes an uncredited appearance as a 78-year-old John Lennon.

== Production ==
Yesterday was produced by Perfect World Pictures, Working Title Films, Decibel Films and Dentsu Inc., and distributed by Universal Pictures.

=== Writing ===
Yesterday began as a 2012 screenplay, Cover Version, by the American writer Jack Barth. Barth had been struggling to sell screenplays for decades. He conceived the story when it occurred to him that if Star Wars did not exist and he conceived it he would not be able to sell it. In Barth's script, a "meditation on professional disappointment", Jack did not find success with the Beatles songs.

The British actor Mackenzie Crook worked on an early version of Barth's script, and intended to direct, but left to work on his television series Detectorists. The script was passed to the production company Working Title. Years later, while working on clearance rights for the Beatles songs, a Working Title producer mentioned the screenplay to the British filmmaker Richard Curtis, who bought it and rewrote it as a romantic comedy. On Curtis's insistence, the screenplay is credited to Curtis and the story credited to Curtis and Barth.

Curtis told interviewers he did not read Barth's script, preferring to use the premise to write his own version. He told Den of Geek: "I sometimes found when I worked with original material that it doesn't come from the heart. So I tried to write a whole film that meant something to me, rather than having too much extra information." However, according to Barth, the final film includes many elements of his screenplay, including Lennon as a wizened fisherman and a joke about Harry Potter. Curtis credited the Harry Potter joke to a suggestion from the American comedian Sarah Silverman, who is thanked in the credits.

Barth complained that Curtis had taken sole credit for the screenplay and damaged him financially. He felt that Curtis had changed the story to make Jack a successful songwriter as a reflection of Curtis's own career: "[Curtis] met Rowan Atkinson at Oxford. He came out of Oxford and immediately rode Rowan Atkinson to huge success in his early twenties. He's never been knocked out, as far as I know. Why wouldn't [Jack] become the most successful songwriter in the world?"

On October 19^{th}, 2026, it was announced that a stage adaptation of Yesterday would be coming to London’s West End.

=== Casting ===
In March 2018, it was announced that Curtis and the director Danny Boyle were working on a musical comedy set in the 1960s or 1970s following "a struggling musician who thinks he's the only person who can remember the Beatles", with Himesh Patel cast in the lead role. Boyle was convinced Patel was the right choice after listening to him perform the Beatles songs "Yesterday" and "Back in the U.S.S.R." during auditions. Boyle felt that Patel's voice had soul. Patel sang and performed guitar and piano himself.

Later in March 2018, Lily James and Kate McKinnon joined the cast. Boyle informed the surviving members and widows of the Beatles about the film and received a reply he described as "lovely" from the Beatles drummer, Ringo Starr. In April 2018, it was revealed that Ed Sheeran had joined the cast. Sheeran's role was originally intended for the Coldplay singer Chris Martin, who turned it down. Sheeran said Harry Styles was also asked, which Boyle denied. Ana de Armas and Lamorne Morris joined later in April, followed by Sophia Di Martino, Joel Fry and Harry Michell in May.

=== Filming ===
Filming began on 21 April 2018, with production in England starting on 26 April 2018, with scenes filmed across East Anglia in Cantley, Halesworth, Dunwich, Shingle Street, at the Latitude Festival, and at Clacton-on-Sea. A casting call was issued for extras in overnight scenes shot immediately after Sheeran's four consecutive concerts at the Principality Stadium in Cardiff, Wales in May 2018. A further 5,000 extras appeared in scenes at Gorleston-on-Sea Beach in Norfolk in June 2018. Wembley Stadium was also used to film a concert scene. Filming also took place in Liverpool, making use of Penny Lane, Liverpool John Lennon Airport, Lime Street Station and the Queensway Tunnel.

In February 2019, it was announced that the title was Yesterday. It is estimated to have cost around $10 million to get the rights for the Beatles' songs, with the rights to their music being held by Apple Records and Sony/ATV Music Publishing.

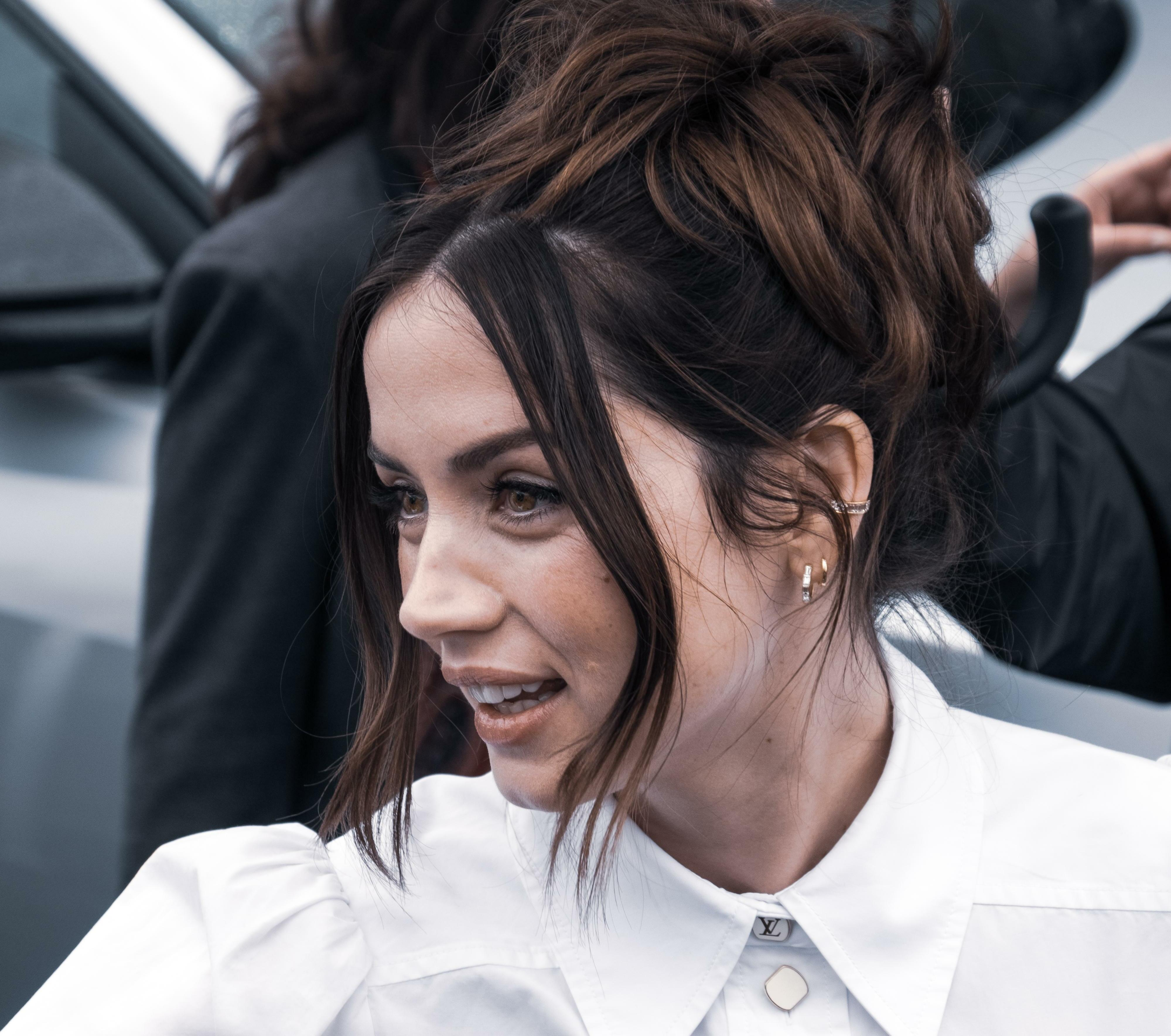
Ana de Armas appeared in the trailer but not the film, resulting in a fan lawsuit.

Scenes with Ana de Armas, who played another love interest for Jack, were cut as test audiences felt it made Jack less sympathetic. De Armas appeared in some of the early promotional material before the final edit was made, which led to a $5 million lawsuit against Universal Pictures when two fans claimed they were "duped into renting the [$3.99] movie because [de Armas] was in the trailer". U.S. District Judge Stephen Wilson allowed the class-action lawsuit to proceed in December 2022, stating that "At its core, a trailer is an advertisement designed to sell a movie by providing consumers with a preview of the movie." Wilson later dismissed the lawsuit, ruling that the "injury is self-inflicted" and thus no standing to sue. The judge also ruled the two men were responsible for $126,705 of Universal's legal fees; by April 2024, the parties had settled, with the men dropping the suit with prejudice in exchange for not needing to pay Universal's fees.

== Music ==
The soundtrack to Yesterday was released by Capitol Records on 21 June 2019, 7 days before the United Kingdom and United States release of the movie. Yesterday featured several Beatles songs performed by Patel, with Adem Ilhan as the music supervisor. Licensing the Beatles discography cost the producers of the movie close to $10 million. Daniel Pemberton was the composer for Yesterday. According to Pemberton, "The idea was to get him comfortable with the songs and getting him to the stage where basically he could play Wembley Stadium." He worked with Patel to cover each song with a "very raw, human performance" style, as Boyle liked it, and refrained from over-produced sounds.

== Release ==
The first trailer was released on 12 February 2019. The film premiered at the Tribeca Film Festival on 4 May 2019. A local screening took place at the Gorleston Palace cinema on 21 June 2019. Universal spent $75.4 million on promotion.

== Reception ==
=== Box office ===
Yesterday grossed $73.3 million in the United States and Canada and $81.3 million in other territories (including $19.4 million in the United Kingdom), for a worldwide total of $154.6 million, against a production budget of $26 million. It spent its first five weeks in the top 10 at the US box office.

In the United States and Canada, Yesterday was projected to gross $10–15 million from 2,603 theatres in its opening weekend. It made $6.1 million on its first day, including $1.25 million from Thursday night previews. It debuting to $17 million, finishing third behind Toy Story 4 and Annabelle Comes Home. In its second weekend, Yesterday made $10.7 million, again finishing third (behind Spider-Man: Far From Home and Toy Story 4), then grossed $6.8 million in its third weekend, falling to fifth.

Deadline Hollywood calculated the net profit at to be $45 million, when factoring together all expenses and revenues and ignoring the UK tax credits on the production cost. Universal officially took an $87.8 million loss on Yesterday in 2019, which Deadline deduced would eventually result in a $26.5 million profit after TV and video sales (an estimated $78.4 million by early 2020) were taken into account.

=== Critical response ===
On the review aggregator website Rotten Tomatoes, 63% of 366 critics' reviews are positive, with an average rating of 6.3/10. The website's consensus reads: "Yesterday may fall short of fab, but the end result is still a sweetly charming fantasy with an intriguing—albeit somewhat under-explored—premise." Metacritic, which uses a weighted average, assigned the film a score of 55 out of 100, based on 45 critics, indicating "mixed or average" reviews. Audiences polled by CinemaScore gave Yesterday an average grade of "A-" on an A+ to F scale.

Peter Bradshaw of The Guardian gave Yesterday four out of five stars, writing "although this film can be a bit hokey and uncertain on narrative development, the puppyish zest and fun summoned up by Curtis and Boyle carry it along." Robbie Collin wrote for The Daily Telegraph that it "rallies in style for a beautifully judged and surprisingly moving finale, which owes a lot to Patel and James's chemistry". Owen Gleiberman of Variety panned the film, calling it a "rom-com wallpapered with the Beatles' greatness". Laura Snapes of The Guardian called Yesterday "the latest jukebox movie to put its women on mute".

=== The Beatles' response ===
McCartney said in an interview with Billboard that he and his wife Nancy Shevell saw Yesterday in a cinema in the Hamptons and "loved it." Boyle also sent copies of the film to Starr and his wife Barbara, as well as George Harrison's widow Olivia, and received "lovely messages" from both parties. John Lennon's widow, Yoko Ono, approved of the depiction of Lennon.

=== Accolades ===
Award	Date of ceremony	Category	Recipients	Result
Awards of the Japanese Academy	6 March 2020	Best Foreign Film	Yesterday	Nominated
Blue Ribbon Awards	22 January 2020	Best Foreign Film	Yesterday	Nominated
Golden Trailer Awards	29 June 2019	Best Music	Universal Pictures and Motive NYC	Nominated
Goya Awards	25 January 2020	Best European Film	Yesterday – Danny Boyle	Nominated
Hollywood Music in Media Awards	9 November 2019	Outstanding Music Supervision – Film	Angela Leus	Nominated
Hollywood Music in Media Awards	9 November 2019	Best Soundtrack Album	Yesterday	Nominated
Montclair Film Festival	May 2019	World Cinema	Danny Boyle	Won
Music City Film Critics' Association Awards	10 January 2020	Best Music Film	Yesterday	Nominated
Toronto International Film Festival	September 2019	People's Choice Award	Favorite Comedy Movie	Nominated
San Diego Film Critics Society	9 December 2019	Best Use of Music in a Film	Yesterday	Nominated
St. Louis Film Critics Association	15 December 2019	Best Soundtrack	Yesterday	Nominated
St. Louis Film Critics Association	15 December 2019	Special Merit (for best scene, cinematic technique or other memorable aspect or moment)	Jack visits cottage.	Nominated
Saturn Awards	13 September 2019	Best Fantasy Film	Yesterday	Nominated
Teen Choice Awards	11 August 2019	Choice Summer Movie	Yesterday	Nominated
Teen Choice Awards	11 August 2019	Choice Summer Movie Actor	Himesh Patel	Nominated
World Soundtrack Awards	12 August 2019	Film Composer of the Year	Daniel Pemberton	Nominated

== Comparisons ==
As remarked upon in the media, a number of other works have had a similar premise or theme involving parallel worlds or time travel. The 2010 Japanese manga I'm a Beatle (僕はビートルズ, Boku wa Bītoruzu) by Tetsuo Fujii and Kaiji Kawaguchi involves an almost identical concept of a musician travelling back in time to 1961 and being surprised when he plays "Yesterday" and no one knows of the Beatles; he similarly plays their material and is successful. Others include the 2011 French graphic novel Yesterday by David Blot and Jérémie Royer (the title, again, alluding to the Beatles song), the 1990s British sitcom Goodnight Sweetheart, the 2006 French film Jean-Philippe, and Nick Milligan's 2013 novel Enormity. Danny Boyle has said he was not aware of earlier works with similar premises when he read the script but had later become aware of a French film and British sitcom Goodnight Sweetheart with a similar premise after the film's first trailer was revealed.

== Stage adaptation ==
In June 2026, a musical adaptation of the film, also written by Curtis (with Emma Freud) and directed by Boyle, was announced as in development.

== See also ==
- Parallel universes in fiction
