= Mystic Challenge =

- Genre: Game show
- Presented by: Paul Ross
- Country of origin: United Kingdom
- Original language: English
- No. of series: 1

Production
- Running time: 30 minutes (inc. adverts)
- Production company: Thames Television

Original release
- Network: Living
- Release: 1 August 2000 – 2001

Mystic Challenge is a game show that aired on Living from 2000 to 2001. It was hosted by Paul Ross.
