= Comics Britannia =

2007 British documentary series

- Created by: BBC Bristol
- Starring: Armando Iannucci
- Country of origin: United Kingdom
- No. of episodes: 3

Production
- Running time: 60 Minutes

Original release
- Network: BBC Four
- Release: 10 September 2007

Comics Britannia is a three-part documentary series from BBC Four which started on 10 September 2007. It was then repeated on BBC Two starting on 19 July 2008.

The series looks at the history of the British comic and is also the centre of a Comics Britannia season.

== Episodes ==
The three programs look at the main periods of British comics. They are narrated by Armando Iannucci.

=== The Fun Factory ===
First shown on Monday 10 September, this documentary looks at the early years of British comics.

It features the launch of The Dandy and follows the growth of the British comics industry through to the 1960s.

=== Boys and Girls ===
First shown on Monday 17 September, the episode looks at the appearance of a large range of comics in the post-war era specifically aimed at boys (Eagle) and girls (Bunty, Girl).

=== X-Rated: Anarchy in the UK ===
First aired on Monday 24 September, it looks at the trend towards darker comics in the 1970s and 1980s with the launch of 2000 AD and the rise of Alan Moore resulting in the "British Invasion" of the American comics industry.

== Comics Britannia season ==
The rest of the season includes documentaries (not necessarily about British comics and artists):

- In Search of Steve Ditko
- Heath Robinson: Suburban Subversive
- Happy Birthday Broons!
- Happy Birthday Wullie
- In Search of Moebius: Jean Giraud
- Tintin and I
- The Comic Strip Hero, Arena documentary about Superman

As well as relevant films and television series:

- My Name Is Modesty, the 2003 Modesty Blaise film
- Tron, the 1982 film (Moebius designed the graphical look)
- Repeats of the 1960s Batman series

== See also ==
- List of Britannia documentaries
