= Jonathan Ross =

English broadcaster and comedian (born 1960)

Jonathan Ross OBE
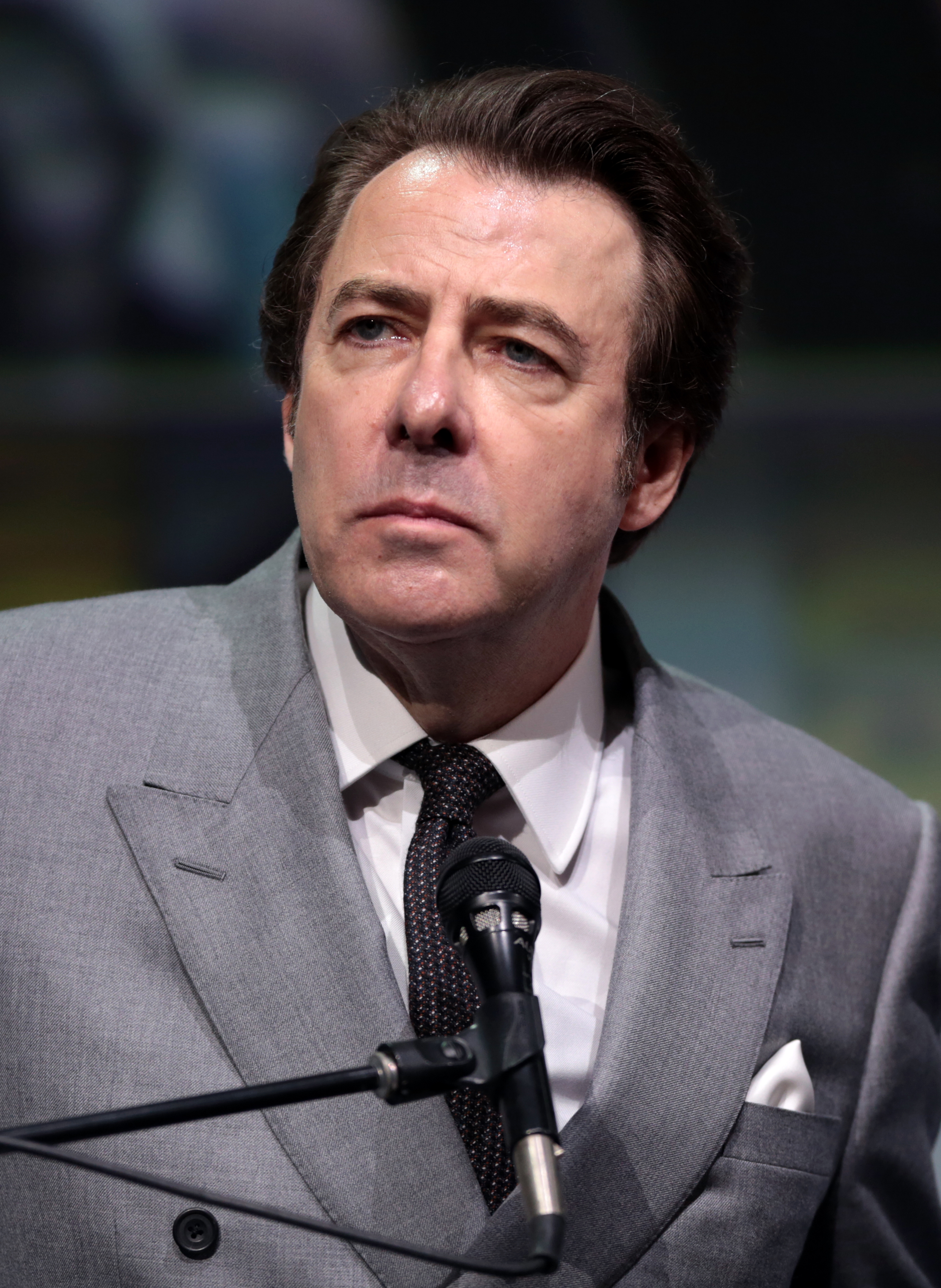
- Ross in 2017
- Born: Jonathan Stephen Ross; 17 November 1960 (age 65); St Pancras, London, England
- Education: Southampton College of Art; School of Slavonic and Eastern European Studies, University College London
- Occupations: Broadcaster; television personality; film critic; comedian; writer; producer
- Years active: 1970–present
- Employer(s): BBC (1997–2010, 2014–2018); Channel 4 (1987–2007, 2009–2014, 2018–present); ITV (1991–2006, 2009, 2011–present); Classic FM (2023–present)
- Spouse: Jane Goldman (m. 1988)
- Children: 3
- Mother: Martha Ross
- Relatives: Paul Ross (brother); Alan Carr (distant cousin)

Jonathan Stephen Ross (born 17 November 1960) is an English broadcaster, television personality, comedian, and writer. He has presented television comedy chat shows including the BBC's Friday Night with Jonathan Ross (2001–2010) and ITV's The Jonathan Ross Show (2011–present). For the BBC show, he won three British Academy Television Awards for Best Entertainment Performance. Ross hosted his own radio show on BBC Radio 2 from 1999 to 2010. He served as film critic and presenter of the television programme Film… (1999–2010).

Ross began his television career as a TV researcher, before debuting as a presenter for the chat show The Last Resort with Jonathan Ross (1987–1988) on Channel 4. His other television work includes being a panellist on the comedy sports quiz show They Think It's All Over (1999–2005), presenting the British Comedy Awards (1991–2007, 2009–2014), judging on the musical competition The Masked Singer (2020–present) and its spin-off The Masked Dancer (2021–2022), and competing on the reality series The Celebrity Traitors (2025). In 2012, Ross received a Special Recognition award at the National Television Awards.

In 2005, Ross was made an Officer of the Order of the British Empire (OBE) for services to broadcasting. In 2008, he wrote a semi-autobiographical work titled Why Do I Say These Things?, detailing some of his life experiences. He has also written his own comic books, Turf and America's Got Powers.

== Early life and education ==
Jonathan Stephen Ross was born on 17 November 1960 in St Pancras, north London and raised in Leytonstone, east London. The son of John and actress Martha Ross, he has four brothers and one sister. He is the younger brother of journalist, television editor, and media personality Paul Ross.

Their mother put all of her children forward for roles in television advertisements. Ross first appeared in a television advertisement for the breakfast cereal Kellogg's Rice Krispies in 1970, when he was 10 years old. He also appeared in an ad for the laundry detergent Persil.

Ross was educated at the comprehensive schools Norlington School for Boys and Leyton County High School for Boys. He then studied at the Southampton College of Art and took a degree in Modern European History at the School of Slavonic and East European Studies (SSEES) in London, which today forms part of University College London.

Ross began his adult career as a researcher on the Channel 4 show Loose Talk. After leaving this, he worked on various other shows before beginning another research job on Soul Train, which became Solid Soul. It is believed his first appearance on television was as an extra in the 1981 It Ain't Half Hot Mum episode "The Last Roll Call".

== Career ==
=== 1987–95: Channel X ===
Whilst on Solid Soul, he met fellow researcher Alan Marke, and the two devised what would prove to be a breakthrough hit for Ross in 1987, The Last Resort with Jonathan Ross.

The two men based their concept on the successful American show Late Night with David Letterman, and formed a new production company called Channel X, to produce a pilot. Ross had not planned to be the show's host, but he presented the show from its debut in January 1987.

While the series was initially a co-production with Colin Callender, ownership transferred to Marke and Ross, meaning that the latter retained a great deal of control as well as being presenter. The show was successful for both Ross and for Channel 4, making him one of the major personalities on the channel. A year later, his documentary series The Incredibly Strange Film Show introduced many to the works of cult filmmakers like Sam Raimi and Jackie Chan. Ross and Raimi appeared together in a British television advertisement for Raimi's 1987 film Evil Dead II.

In 1990 and 1991, his television documentary series Jonathan Ross Presents for One Week Only profiled and interviewed directors including Alejandro Jodorowsky, David Lynch, Aki Kaurismäki and in 2014, the Spanish filmmaker Pedro Almodóvar.

In 1989, he co-presented the biennial BBC charity telethon Comic Relief, the same year he launched One Hour with Jonathan Ross a short lived chat show on Channel 4. Its game show segment, "Knock down ginger", introduced comedians such as Vic Reeves, Bob Mortimer, Paul Whitehouse and Charlie Higson to television. In December 1989, Ross appeared on Cilla's Goodbye to the 80s and presented all four members of Queen with the "Top Band of the Eighties" prize in a broadcast for ITV which would turn out to be Freddie Mercury's penultimate public appearance before his death from AIDS in 1991.

Ross presented the annual British Comedy Awards each year from 1991 to 2014 with the exception of 2008 following his suspension from the BBC. In 1992 he presented an interview with Madonna about her Erotica album and Sex Book promotion.

Ross has appeared in numerous television entertainment programmes on several channels throughout the 1990s and 2000s. He was a regular panellist on the sports quiz They Think It's All Over, and hosted the panel game It's Only TV...But I Like It. Other projects include the BBC joke-quiz Gagtag, the Channel 4 variety show Saturday Zoo, new-acts showcase The Big Big Talent Show, and the ITV programme Fantastic Facts.

In 1995, he left Channel X, despite its profitable nature. He was quoted in a 1998 article as stating:

It was to do with a deliberate change in my life, moving away from TV as the core of my existence to focus on my family more. So I had to give up everything to do with Channel X, and I literally got only £1 for my share, which was unbelievable.

=== 1995–2006 ===
In 1995, he presented Mondo Rosso, a programme about old cult films. He took over presenting of the Film programme, the BBC's long-running cinema review series, in 1999 after Barry Norman left the show. Ross himself has made a number of cameo appearances in films, playing himself in the Spice Girls' film Spice World (1997) and voicing the character of Doris in the UK version of Shrek 2 (2004). In 2001 he also played himself in Only Fools and Horses, presenting Goldrush, a fictional television quiz on which the main character, Del, was a contestant. In 2001 he voiced characters in two episodes of the animated comedy series Rex the Runt. He also appeared on the first pilot show for Shooting Stars, acting as a team captain.

He was the subject of This Is Your Life in March 2001 when he was surprised by Michael Aspel at the BBC Television Centre.

=== 1987, 1999–2010, 2014–2018: BBC Radio ===
Ross's first radio work was on BBC Radio 1 in 1987, when he sat in for Janice Long for two weeks. Ross began presenting a Saturday morning show on BBC Radio 2 in July 1999. He has also presented radio shows for Virgin Radio (having previously worked on Richard Branson's earlier venture, Radio Radio), as well as the now-defunct commercial radio network service The Superstation, where his producer was Chris Evans. Ross's show on Radio 2 last aired on 17 July 2010 when his contract at the BBC ended.

In August 2014, he returned to Radio 2 as a stand-in presenter on Steve Wright's afternoon show for four days. In March 2015 Jonathan sat in for Steve Wright again from 16 to 27 March 2015. In February 2016 Ross returned to Radio 2 on a regular basis to present the weekly arts show. From 11 January 2018, Anneka Rice took over the arts show.

=== 2001–10: Friday Night with Jonathan Ross and other projects ===
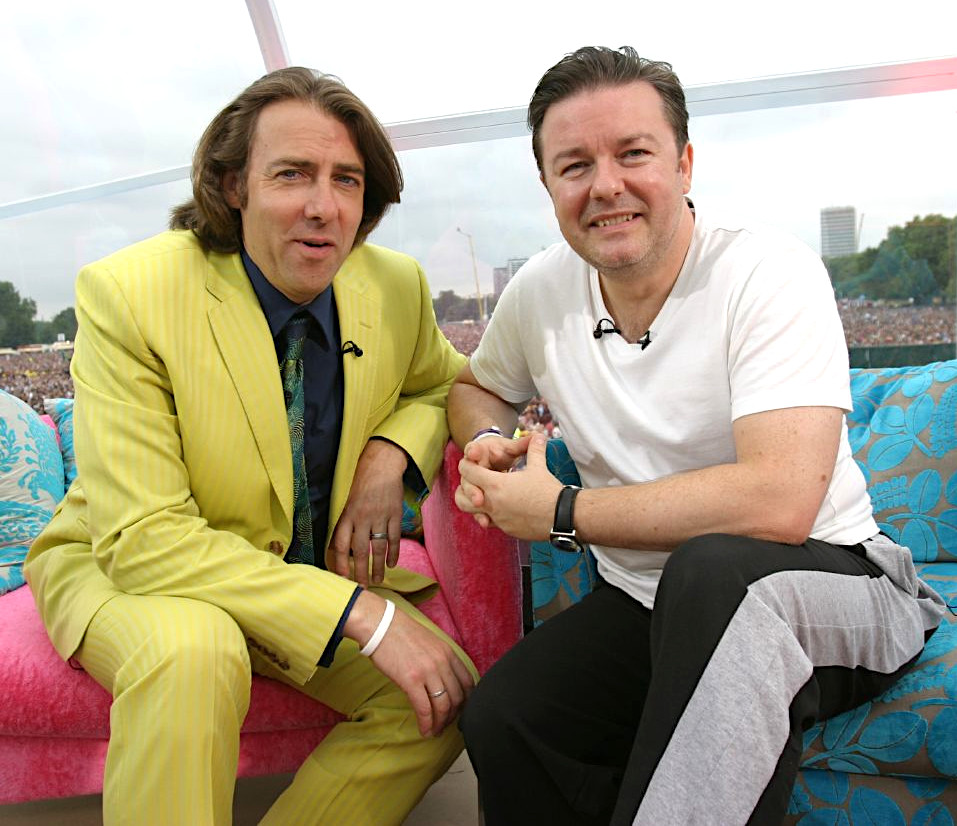
Ross with Ricky Gervais at Live 8 in July 2005

In 2001, Ross began presenting his BBC One comedy chat show Friday Night with Jonathan Ross.

In 2004, Ross presented a documentary on one of his favourite subjects, punk rock, for the BBC.

At the 2004 British Comedy Awards, Ross made a joke about David Walliams: "The comedy awards is 15 years old – 15 years old! And like most 15-year-olds, it’s drunk, it’s unpredictable and it’s probably going home with David Walliams." Following the publication of the allegations of sexual misconduct and grooming against Walliams in November 2026, Ross commented: "This joke was submitted to me by the Comedy Awards script writing team and I believed that the punchline was a reference to the fact he had publicly dated younger women, exaggerated for comic effect. Had I had any reason to suspect that it might be referring to actual events, I would not only have refused to use it, but I would not have felt comfortable continuing a personal or professional relationship with him."

In November 2005, Ross appeared on Gordon Ramsay's The F Word where Ramsay shows Ross how to kill lobster.

In 2005, Ross anchored the BBC television coverage of the Live 8 concerts. Later that year he was made an Officer of the Order of the British Empire in the Queen's Birthday Honours for services to broadcasting. He celebrated the news by playing "God Save the Queen" by The Sex Pistols (which was banned by the BBC when released in 1977) on his BBC Radio 2 Saturday morning show. On 21 June 2006, Ross was made a Fellow of University College London, where he studied.

In early 2006, Ross announced that after eight years he was quitting his regular panellist seat on the sport/comedy quiz show They Think It's All Over explaining: "I need time now to focus on my other commitments and so regrettably I won't be back for the 20th series." Following Ross's departure, only two more episodes of the show were made before it was cancelled.

In January 2006 he presented Jonathan Ross' Asian Invasion, broadcast on BBC Four. The three-part documentary followed Ross as he explored the film industry in Japan, Hong Kong and South Korea, interviewing directors and showcasing clips. His interest in East Asian culture and his self-confessed love for Japanese anime and video games led him to making three series of BBC Three show Japanorama, as well as producing another television series for the same channel called Adam and Joe Go Tokyo, starring Adam Buxton and Joe Cornish. He produced the latter programme through his own television production company Hot Sauce.

In April 2006, details of his fees and those of other BBC personalities were leaked to the tabloid press. It was claimed at the time, by a then-unidentified BBC mole, that Ross earned £530,000 per year for hosting his Radio 2 show (equivalent to £10,000 per show). While refusing to comment specifically on the leak in line with BBC policy on the matter, Ross did hint during his radio show that the figure was exaggerated; in addition to this, any pay highlighted as being "his" would actually be split between himself and his producer/co-presenter on the show, Andy Davies.

In June 2006, a bidding war was sparked between BBC and other broadcasters for Ross's services. Although other broadcasters were unsuccessful in poaching Ross, it is believed that their bids were higher than the BBC during negotiations. ITV, who bid for Ross, poached chat host Michael Parkinson around the same time. Ross became the highest paid television personality in Britain, when a new BBC contract secured his services until 2010, for a reported £18 million (£6 million per year). That same month, he was named by Radio Times as the most powerful person in British radio.

On 25 June 2006, he performed at the Children's Party at the Palace for the Queen's 80th birthday. In August 2006, Ross asked the first question in the Yahoo! Answers "Five Million Answers challenge". On 16 March 2007, Ross hosted Comic Relief 2007 alongside Fearne Cotton and Lenny Henry.

In June 2006, when Conservative Party leader David Cameron appeared on Friday Night with Jonathan Ross, Ross began a line of questioning relating to Conservative ex-Prime Minister Margaret Thatcher, culminating in the question "Did you or did you not have a wank thinking of Margaret Thatcher?" Ross was defended by the BBC publicly, but repeat showings of the interview have been banned.

On 7 July 2007, Ross co-presented (with Graham Norton) BBC television coverage of the Live Earth climate change awareness concerts, which became the subject of controversy due to the foul language used by performers including Phil Collins, Madonna and Johnny Borrell, resulting in one of Ofcom's toughest sanctions to date on the BBC. Ross had been required to apologise on the day for the language used by Collins and Borrell.

Ross is well-known as an enthusiastic comic book collector. Starting on 10 September 2007, he presented the BBC Four series Comics Britannia, about the history of the British comic. This forms the core of a Comics Britannia season, which includes another documentary, In Search of Steve Ditko, by Ross. Ross is also greatly interested in Japan, presenting a BBC-TV series on many different aspects of Japanese culture, Japanorama, for three series between 2002 and 2007. In May 2008, Ross won the Sony Gold Award "Music Radio Personality of the Year". On 3 August 2008, he hosted Jonathan Ross Salutes Dad's Army, a BBC One tribute to the sitcom set during World War II.

On 5 December 2007, Ross joked at the British Comedy Awards that his salary meant that he was "apparently worth 1,000 BBC journalists". His quip came shortly after the BBC had announced plans for more than 2,000 job cuts, and was condemned as "obscene" by the general secretary of the National Union of Journalists. Ross has denied this and in a 2011 article is quoted as saying that he was commenting on a piece that was written in a newspaper about his salary being that of 1,000 journalists:

You know where that came from? The newspapers. After the fee was announced, they said, 'The BBC says he's worth 1,000 journalists', so on the Comedy Awards I made a joke that began, 'Apparently I'm worth 1,000 journalists according to the newspapers.' Every time it's quoted, is the word 'apparently' ever used? Which does change the meaning somewhat.

The BBC Trust ruled that Ross's interview with American actress Gwyneth Paltrow, broadcast on 2 May 2008, breached editorial guidelines. They ruled that bad language in an episode of Ross's pre-recorded BBC1 chat show, Friday Night with Jonathan Ross, in which the presenter told Paltrow he "would fuck her", was "gratuitous and unnecessarily offensive". The trust said it disagreed with the judgement made by BBC management that the episode should be broadcast uncensored, adding that the comment was made in an "overly sexual way" and that it had upheld a number of complaints made about the edition of Friday Night with Jonathan Ross. The trust reminded BBC staff that "the casual gratuitous use of the most offensive language is not acceptable on the BBC in accordance with the BBC's existing guidelines and practices", adding that "this particularly applies in entertainment programmes".

==== The Russell Brand Show and Andrew Sachs ====
Following a guest appearance by Ross on The Russell Brand Show broadcast on 18 October 2008, Ross was suspended for 12 weeks without pay by the BBC on 29 October, after a series of lewd answerphone messages, including Ross saying, "He fucked your granddaughter", were left for then 78-year-old actor Andrew Sachs regarding Sachs' granddaughter Georgina Baillie, by Russell Brand and Ross, which were broadcast on the pre-recorded show. After little initial interest, a media story about the calls by the Daily Mail generated a high number of complaints. Brand resigned from the BBC, while Ross was suspended without pay. BBC director general Mark Thompson stated that Ross should take the disciplinary action as a "final warning". The BBC was later fined £150,000 by Britain's broadcast regulator for airing the calls.

On 21 November 2008, the BBC Trust said that the phone calls were a "deplorable intrusion with no editorial justification". The trust gave its backing to Ross's 12-week suspension but recommended that no further action be taken against him. He returned to work in January 2009 with a new series of Friday Night. From 23 May 2009, Ross's BBC Radio 2 show was recorded 24 hours before broadcast.

==== Homophobia allegation ====
On 13 May 2009, Ross was accused of homophobia after a comment he made on his radio show, in which he said,

If your son asks for a Hannah Montana MP3 player, then you might want to already think about putting him down for adoption in later life, when they settle down with their partner.

An incorrect version of this quote was also circulated, in which Ross was accused of saying:

If your son asks for a Hannah Montana MP3 player, you might want to already think about putting him down for adoption before he brings his ... erm ... partner home.

Ofcom received 61 complaints following the comment. On 7 July 2009, Ofcom ruled that Ross did not breach the broadcasting code. They wrote in their opinion that "the comment was clearly presented as a joke intended to make light of the reactions that some parents may have if their child chooses a toy that is very widely recognised to be designed and marketed for the opposite sex" and that the nature of the joke and tone and manner in which it was presented "made clear that it was not intended to be hostile or pejorative towards the gay community in general." Stonewall criticised the ruling; saying "the fact that a comment is light-hearted does not absolve it from perpetuating the stereotypes that lead to homophobic bullying."

==== Activities outside the BBC ====
In 2010, Ross took part in Channel 4's Comedy Gala, a benefit show held in aid of Great Ormond Street Hospital, filmed live at The O2 Arena in London on 30 March. On 7 April 2010, Ross's first comic book was published. Turf was written by Jonathan himself and drawn by artist Tommy Lee Edwards. In 2011, Ross wrote an introduction for The Steve Ditko Omnibus Vol. 1, a collection of work by the American comics artist featured in Ross's 2007 documentary.

=== 2010: Leaving the BBC ===
On 7 January 2010, Ross confirmed that he would leave the BBC in July 2010. This would see him leave all his regular BBC roles, namely his Friday night chat show, Radio 2 show and the film review programme, although he would be continuing with some specials, such as Comic Relief and the BAFTA Awards.

Ross said that while he "had a wonderful time working for the BBC" he had "decided not to re-negotiate when my current contract comes to an end," a choice which was "not financially motivated". The announcement came a day after it became public knowledge that Graham Norton had signed a two-year deal with the BBC. Torin Douglas, the corporation's media correspondent speculated Norton would be a ready-made replacement for Ross's chat show role, while Mark Kermode of BBC Radio 5 Live was a potential successor in the film review role, but that "replacing Ross on radio will be harder." Ross last appeared on the film programme in Episode 10 of Film 2010 with Jonathan Ross aired on 17 March 2010. After Kermode publicly ruled himself out on 26 March, Claudia Winkleman was announced 30 March 2010 as his replacement as host of the Film programme.

Ross's final Friday Night chat show episode aired on 16 July 2010, with David Beckham, Jackie Chan, Mickey Rourke, and Roxy Music as guests. Ross ended the show with an affectionate tribute to his guests and to the audience, while mentioning that he had promised Morrissey that he would remain composed and "wouldn't cry." His final Radio 2 show was broadcast the following day. Patrick Kielty initially took over Ross's Radio 2 slot, after which Graham Norton took over permanently from 2 October that year.

=== 2010–present: ITV and Channel 4 ===
On 19 December 2010, Ross presented a three-hour Channel 4 list show, 100 Greatest Toys, with the broadcaster describing Ross as a "huge toy enthusiast with a private collection that would rival any museum's". In 2012, Ross's voice appeared as a headteacher in Back to School at the Edinburgh Festival. In October 2013, Ross was hired by Xbox (Microsoft) to help promote the brand. In 2011, he presented Penn & Teller: Fool Us on ITV, a collaboration with magicians Penn & Teller, which he would resume hosting when the show moved to The CW in 2014.

Ross's new chat show, The Jonathan Ross Show, began on 3 September 2011 on ITV1, drawing an audience of 4.3m viewers, compared to the 4.6m for his finale on the BBC show. The first series ran for thirteen weeks. Speaking about the new show, Ross said: "I am thrilled and excited that after a short break I will be rolling up my sleeves and creating a brand new show for ITV1."

On 1 March 2014 Loncon 3, the 72nd World Science Fiction Convention, announced that Ross would be the Master of Ceremonies for the 2014 Hugo Awards ceremony, to be held in August at ExCeL London. This generated angry criticism from members of science fiction fandom who objected to the idea, citing Ross's record of controversial statements and actions. Convention committee member Farah Mendlesohn strongly objected to the choice of Ross as MC, and resigned when the Loncon 3 Co-Chairs would not reconsider the choice, writing (in part), '[Ross] is a man who has made a fortune (6 million a year at one point) from abusing others—particularly women—live on air.' He publicly withdrew as MC not long after the announcement, tweeting 'I have decided to withdraw from hosting the Hugo's @loncon3 in response to some who would rather I weren't there. Have a lovely convention.'

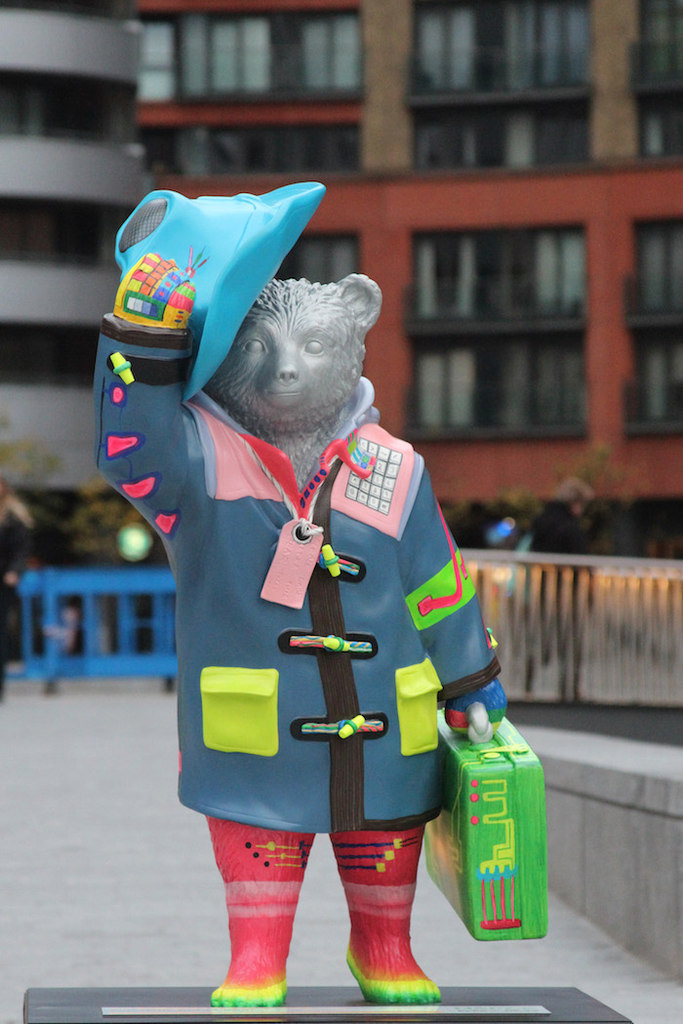
Ross's Paddington Bear designed statue—themed "Futuristic Robot Bear"—in the City of Westminster, London, auctioned for the NSPCC

On 20 October 2014, it was announced by ITV that Ross had signed a new contract with ITV. The new contract will see him present two more series of his chatshow along with a Christmas Special on ITV in 2015. ITV's Director of Entertainment and Comedy Elaine Bedell added: "Jonathan is the king of talk shows and a valued member of the ITV family. He continues to attract the biggest names in showbiz onto his sofa and I am delighted that he will remain on the channel until at least the end of 2015." Ross said: "I've been lucky enough to interview some of the biggest stars around on The Jonathan Ross Show and I'm delighted that I'll continue to do so for ITV until at least the end of 2015 with two series booked for the channel for next year."

In November 2014, Ross designed a Paddington Bear statue, one of fifty created by various celebrities which were located around London prior to the release of the film Paddington, with the statues auctioned to raise funds for the National Society for the Prevention of Cruelty to Children (NSPCC).

In 2015, Ross's 2004 interview with Amy Winehouse was featured in Asif Kapadia's highly praised documentary film about the late singer, entitled Amy. In 2017, Ross was a team captain along with Frank Skinner on the ITV panel show Don't Ask Me Ask Britain. In December 2017, Ross presented Guess the Star, a one-off special for ITV. On 9 September 2019, Ross was announced as a judge for The Masked Singer UK, the UK version of the international music game show Masked Singer, which aired on ITV from January 2020.

In September 2020, Ross started hosting his own 30-minute weekly ITV show called Jonathan Ross' Comedy Club. On 4 March 2021, it was announced by ITV that Ross would be on the celebrity panel of a brand new spin-off show of The Masked Singer UK, The Masked Dancer, which aired in spring 2021. Ross made his debut appearance on Celebrity Gogglebox on 2 July 2021, and was joined by his son, Harvey, daughter Honey and her boyfriend. In March 2023, Ross replaced Andrew Collins as presenter of the weekly radio show Saturday Night at the Movies on Classic FM. In May 2025, Ross was announced as a contestant on the first series of The Celebrity Traitors. Ross was selected as a traitor alongside Alan Carr and Cat Burns but was eventually banished in episode 7. In an interview with Metro, Ross said that he is still in touch with the cast, and even "organised a big Christmas lunch" for the entire cast.

== Personal life ==
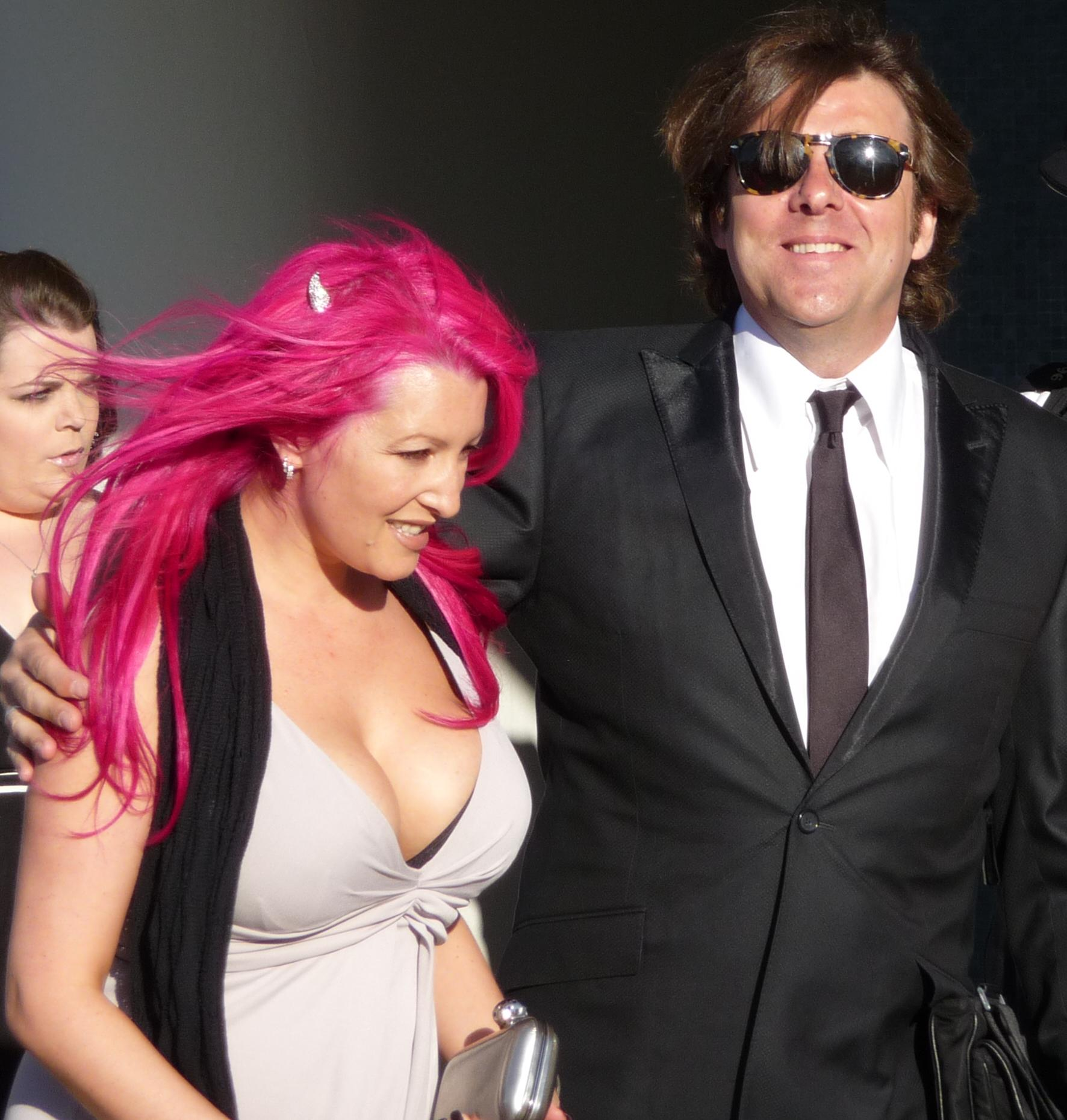
Ross with his wife Jane Goldman at the 2009 British Academy Television Awards

=== Family and residence ===
Ross began dating Jane Goldman in January 1987 when he was 26 and she was 16. They married in Las Vegas in August 1988 two months after she turned 18. Goldman is an author, journalist, and broadcaster. They have three children: Betty Kitten, Harvey Kirby (named after Jack Kirby, a comic book creator whom Ross especially admires), and Honey Kinny.

Ross's mother, Martha Ross, died on 14 January 2019, at the age of 79.

Ross resides in Hampstead Garden Suburb, London. He owns a second home in Swanage in Dorset and owns property in Florida in the United States.

Ross and others have used his rhotacism for comic effect, and he is sometimes known as "Wossy", including on his Twitter/X feed (@wossy).

Ross has been a friend of both David Walliams and Russell Brand. In 2026, he said he was "horrified" by the allegations of sexual misconduct and grooming against Walliams and Brand's conviction for rape and sexual assault.

=== Awards and charity ===
In 2005, Ross was made an OBE in the Queen's Birthday Honours for services to broadcasting. He celebrated the news by playing "God Save the Queen" by the Sex Pistols on his Radio 2 show.

Ross has attended a fundraiser for the James Randi Educational Foundation called The Amazing Meeting in London in 2009 and 2010. Ross has described himself as a big fan of James Randi and the other speakers – who were mainly prominent sceptics – and said that he and his wife had come to have a sceptical view of the world. Ross has been supportive of Simon Singh's efforts to defend an accusation of libel by the British Chiropractic Association and Ross has posed for the Geek Calendar 2011, a fund raiser for The Libel Reform Campaign.

=== Interests ===
Ross is a big pop and rock music fan and maintains a particular interest in British punk rock, which captivated him when he was young. The first band he saw in concert was punk band X-Ray Spex at Islington's Hope and Anchor pub in North London. He paid tribute to lead singer Poly Styrene following her death. He has described himself as "about as big a fan of David Bowie as you will find on the planet". The glam art rock band Roxy Music are one of his all-time favourite acts and were invited to perform on the final episode of Friday Night with Jonathan Ross.

Ross is a fan of science fiction, including Doctor Who. He contributed his early memories of the series, which included the 1968 serial The Invasion, to a book which raised funds for Alzheimer's Research UK.

Ross is a fan of the animation studio Studio Ghibli, especially the works of director Hayao Miyazaki, and has been an early proponent of its works before its international popularity. He first saw Nausicaä of the Valley of the Wind in 1987, which he praises as "massively underrated", and considers Spirited Away to be a "masterpiece". He would later interview Miyazaki for Japanorama. Ross provided a minor voice role in one episode of Ronja, the Robber's Daughter.

Ross is also a fan of comic books and co-owned a comic shop in London with Paul Gambaccini. He released Turf, his first comic book, in 2010, with American artist Tommy Lee Edwards.

In 2023, Ross was integral to the preservation of the arcade version of Um Jammer Lammy, previously thought to be lost, by allowing video game archivists access to his arcade cabinet, thought of as one of the world's last examples.

Ross has said he collects some movie memorabilia, including the jumpsuit worn by Laurence Fishburne in Event Horizon, as well as a couple of hand grenades off the set off Kick-Ass, which his wife had taken for him.

== Filmography ==
=== Television ===
==== As himself ====
Year	Title	Role	Channel
1987–1988	The Last Resort	Presenter	Channel 4
1988–1989	The Incredibly Strange Film Show	Presenter	Channel 4
1989–90	One Hour with Jonathan Ross	Presenter	Channel 4
1990–1991	Jonathan Ross Presents for One Week Only	Presenter	Channel 4
1990–92	Tonight With Jonathan Ross	Presenter	Channel 4
1991–2007, 2009–2014	British Comedy Awards	Presenter	Channel 4
1992	Americana	Co-presenter	Channel 4
1993	Saturday Zoo	Presenter	Channel 4
1994	Gagtag	Presenter	BBC One
1995	Mondo Rosso	Presenter	BBC Two
1995	In Search of James Bond with Jonathan Ross	Presenter	ITV
1995	In Search of Dracula with Jonathan Ross	Presenter	ITV
1996	The Late Jonathan Ross	Presenter	
1996–1997	The Big Big Talent Show	Presenter	ITV
1997	In Search of Hamlet	Presenter	ITV
1998–2005	They Think It's All Over	Regular panellist	BBC One
1999–2002	It's Only TV...but I Like It	Presenter	BBC One
1999–2010	Film...	Presenter	BBC One
2001–2007	The Hollywood Greats	Presenter	BBC One
2001–2010	Friday Night with Jonathan Ross	Presenter	BBC One
2001–2013, 2017	Comic Relief	Co-presenter	BBC One
2002–2007	Japanorama	Presenter	BBC Choice; BBC Three
2004	Britain's Best Sitcom	Presenter	BBC Two
2006	Jonathan Ross' Asian Invasion	Presenter	BBC Four
2007	Comics Britannia	Presenter	BBC Four
2007	In Search of Steve Ditko	Presenter	BBC Four
2008	Jonathan Ross Salutes Dad's Army	Presenter	BBC One
2009	David Lean in Close-Up	Presenter	BBC One
2010	100 Greatest Toys	Presenter	Channel 4
2011, 2015	Penn & Teller: Fool Us	Presenter	ITV (series 1); The CW (series 2)
2011–present	The Jonathan Ross Show	Presenter	ITV
2013	Celebrity Deal or No Deal	Contestant, won £20,000	Channel 4
2015	James Bond's Spectre with Jonathan Ross	Presenter	ITV
2017	Don't Ask Me Ask Britain	Team captain	ITV
2017	Guess the Star	Presenter	ITV
2017–2018	Takeshi's Castle	Voiceover	Comedy Central UK
2018–2019	Roast Battle	Judge; series 2–3	Comedy Central UK
2018, 2020	The Big Narstie Show	Guest, Season 1, Episode 6, Season 3 Episode 6	Channel 4
2020	Jonathan Ross's Comedy Club	Presenter	ITV
2020–present	The Masked Singer	Judge	ITV
2021	Celebrity Gogglebox	Cast Member	ITV
2021	The Big Fat Quiz of the Year 2021	Contestant	ITV
2021–2022	The Masked Dancer	Judge	ITV
2022	8 Out of 10 Cats Does Countdown	Guest team captain	Channel 4
2022	The Big Fat Quiz of the Year	Panelist (with Rose Matafeo)	Channel 4
2022	Jonathan Ross' New Year Comedy Special	Presenter	ITV
2023	Jonathan Ross: Must-Watch Films	Presenter	ITVX
2023	Myths and Legends with Jonathan Ross	Presenter	More4
2023	Big Zuu's Big Eats	Guest	Dave
2023	Britain Get Singing	Judge	ITV
2024–present	Oscars Live	Host	ITV
2025	The Celebrity Traitors	Contestant; series 1	BBC One
2026–present	Handcuffed: Last Pair Standing	Host	Channel 4

==== As actor ====
Year	Title	Role	Notes
1981	It Ain't Half Hot Mum	Soldier	Episode: "The Last Roll Call"
1990	Your Cheatin' Heart	Himself	Episode: "This Could Turn Septic On Us, Ya Big Ungrateful Midden"
1993	French and Saunders	Johnny Carson	Episode: "The Silence of the Lambs"
2000	Jonathan Creek	Himself	Episode: "The Three Gamblers"
2001	Happiness	Himself	Episode: "Celebration"
2001	Rex the Runt	Awards Announcer / Handsome Rex (voice)	2 episodes
2001	Only Fools and Horses	Himself	Episode: "If They Could See Us Now.....!"
2003–2004	Bo' Selecta!	Himself	2 episodes
2006	Rob Brydon's Annually Retentive	Himself	Episode: "1.1"
2006–2007	Extras	Himself	2 episodes
2018	Legends & Lies	James Pettigrew	Episode: "Gettysburg: The High Water Mark"

=== Film ===
Year	Title	Role	Notes
1980	Breaking Glass	Extra	Uncredited
1981	Rise and Fall of Idi Amin	Israeli Soldier	Uncredited
1989	The Tall Guy	Himself	
1994	There's No Business...	Himself	
1997	Pervirella	Bish Archop	
1997	Spice World	Himself	
2004	Shrek 2	Doris the Ugly Stepsister	UK dub
2005	Valiant	Big Thug (voice)	

=== Television advertisements ===
Year	Title	Role
1970	Kellogg's Rice Krispies	Himself
1970	Persil	Himself
1990	Harp Lager	Himself
1992	IBM 486 Computer	Himself, voice only
1996	The Sun/Woolworths	Himself
1997	Pizza Hut	Himself
1997	Austin Powers cinema release	Himself, voice only
1998	The Full Monty home video	Himself, voice only
1998	Sure for Men	Himself
1999	ONdigital	Himself
2000	Fish4	Himself, voice only
2000	Milk Marketing Board	Himself, voice only
2000	TVTimes	Himself, voice only
2001	Nestle Polo Smoothies	Himself, voice only
2008	WHSmith Half Price Books Offer	Himself, voice only
2010	Super Mario Bros. 25th Anniversary	Himself
2012	Sky+	Himself

=== Video games ===
Year	Video game	Role	Notes
2007	Halo 3	Additional Voices	Uncredited
2010	Fable III	Barry Hatch	
2013	Catcha Catcha Aliens!	Main Character	iOS game. Made by Ross's own company.
2019	The Bradwell Conspiracy	Narrator	Voice only

=== Animation ===
Year	Show	Episode	Character
2012	Phineas and Ferb	"Tri-State Area: Boot of Secrets" (Season 3)	The Ducky MoMo Guy (cameo)

== Honours and awards ==
- 2005, Ross was made an OBE by Prince Charles in the Queen's Birthday Honours for services to broadcasting.
- 2006, made a Fellow of University College, London (UCL), into which his alma mater, SSEES, had been absorbed.
- 2012, Special Recognition award at the National Television Awards.

Preceded by David Yates	NFTS Honorary Fellowship; 2011	Succeeded by Ashley Pharoah
