= Jonathan Ross Presents for One Week Only =

Jonathan Ross Presents for One Week Only is a 1990 documentary presented by Jonathan Ross, in which he interviewed filmmakers including David Lynch, Aki Kaurismäki, Alejandro Jodorowsky and in 2014, the Spanish filmmaker, Pedro Almodovar.

== Alejandro Jodorowsky ==
The documentary presents a sober look at the behind the scenes machinations of the film industry for Jodorowsky's films up until that point. Films discussed include: Fando y Lis, El Topo, The Holy Mountain, Santa Sangre and Jodorowsky's failed project of Dune. It also features candid interviews with Dennis Hopper, Omar Sharif and Marcel Marceau.
