= Hatton Garden safe deposit burglary =

2015 underground vault theft in London

Coordinates: 51°31′10″N 0°06′30″W

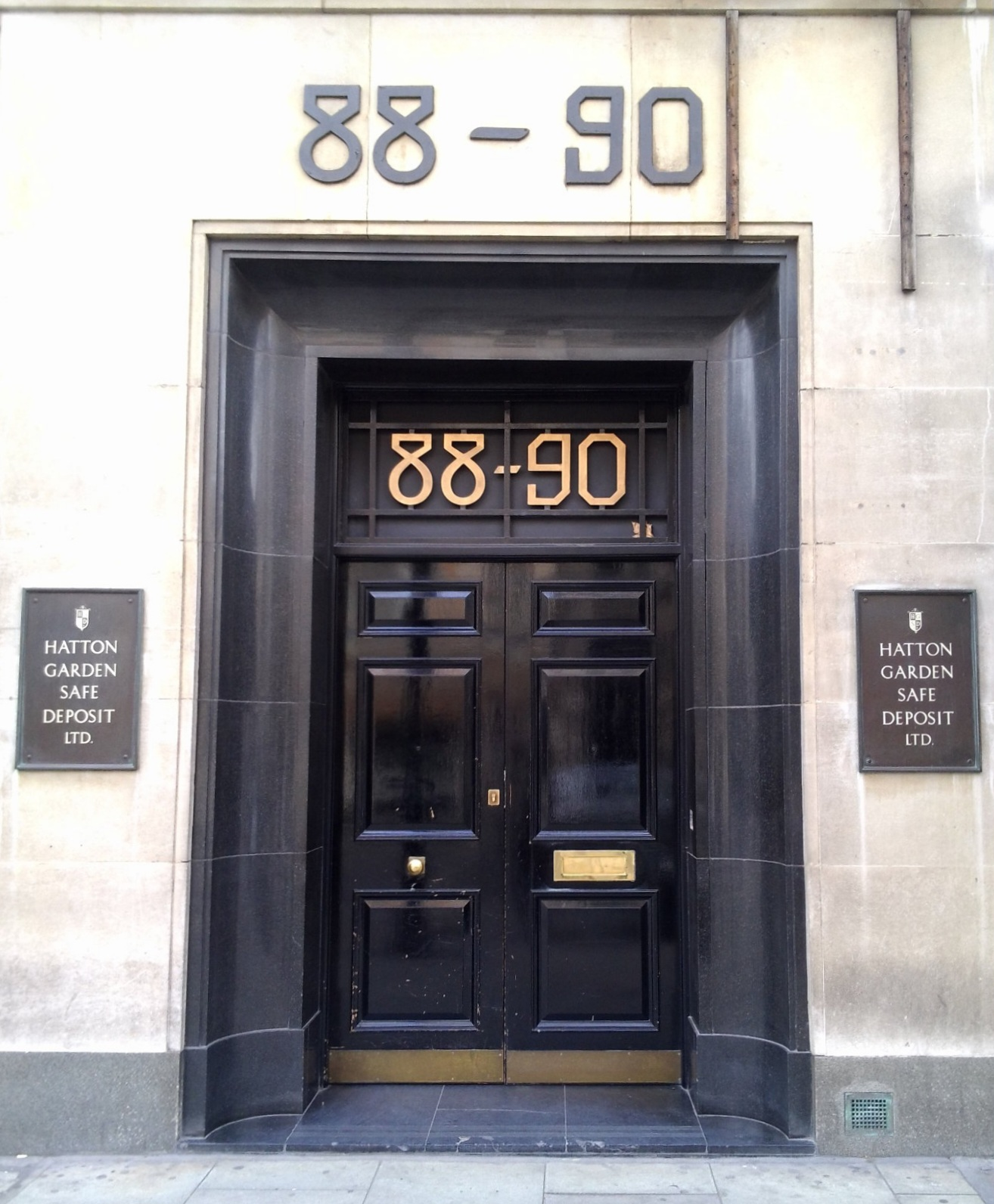
The entrance to Hatton Garden Safe Deposit Ltd at number 88–90, Hatton Garden

In April 2015, an underground safe deposit facility in Hatton Garden, London, owned by Hatton Garden Safe Deposit Ltd., was burgled. According to official sources, the total stolen had an estimated value of up to £14 million (equivalent to £19 million in 2025), of which only £4.3 million (equivalent to £5.9 million in 2025) has been recovered. The burglars entered through a lift shaft over the Easter bank holiday weekend and used a Hilti DD350 industrial power drill to bore through the 50-centimetre-thick (20 in) vault walls.

The heist was planned and carried out by six elderly men who were experienced thieves. All six were arrested, pleaded guilty and received prison sentences in March 2016. Four other men were also tried on suspicion of involvement; three were found guilty and sent to prison, whilst the fourth was cleared. The investigation was assigned to the Flying Squad, and the theft was described as the “largest burglary in English legal history”. The burglary has been the subject of several films and television dramatisations.

== Burglary ==
The Kingsway fire, which caused widespread disruption in central London, was initially speculated to be connected to the burglary

The burglars worked through the four-day weekend of the Easter bank holiday, when many of the nearby businesses (several of them also connected with Hatton Garden’s jewellery trade) were closed. There was no externally visible sign of a forced entry to the premises. It was reported that the burglars had entered the premises through a lift shaft, then drilled through the 50 cm (20 in) thick vault walls with a Hilti DD350 industrial power drill.

The police first announced that the facility had been burgled on 7 April, and reports based on CCTV footage (released by the Daily Mirror before the police released it) state that the attack on the facility commenced on Thursday 2 April. The video showed people nicknamed by the newspaper as “Mr Ginger, Mr Strong, Mr Montana, The Gent, The Tall Man and The Old Man”. On 22 April, the police released pictures of the inside of the vault showing damage caused by the burglary, and how the burglars had used holes drilled through the vault’s wall to bypass the main vault door.

The theft was so significant that the investigation was assigned to the Flying Squad, a branch of the Specialist, Organised & Economic Crime Command within London’s Metropolitan Police Service. On 8 April, press reports emerged speculating that a major underground fire in nearby Kingsway may have been started to create a diversion as part of the Hatton Garden burglary. The London Fire Brigade later stated that the fire had been caused by an electrical fault, with no sign of arson.

== Timeline ==
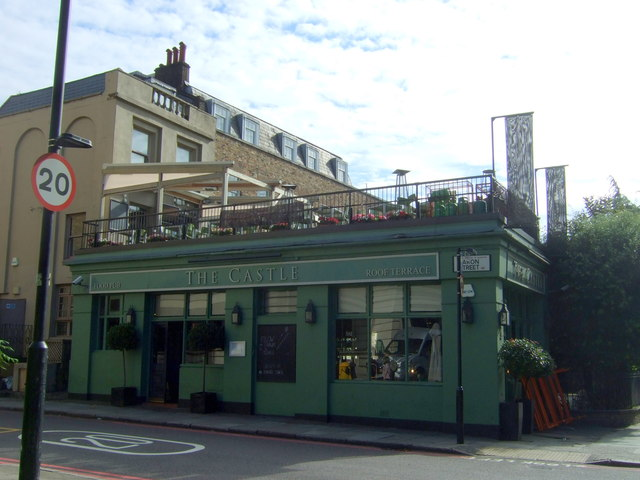
The Castle public house, Pentonville Road, where much of the heist’s planning took place

On 1 April 2015, electrical cables under the pavement in Kingsway caught fire, leading to serious disruption in central London including evacuations, power cuts to local residents, and the cancellation of several West End theatre performances. Flames shot from a manhole cover after a gas main burst, and the fire continued for two days before being extinguished. There was also substantial disruption to telecommunications infrastructure.

The burglary then proceeded as follows:

- 2 April 2015, 21:19 – Depository staff locked the doors for the Easter weekend
- 2 April 2015, 21:23 – “Mr Ginger” descended to the vault, followed by three men pulling wheelie bins
- 3 April 2015, 00:21 – Metropolitan Police were informed that the burglar alarm had been triggered, but did not respond
- 3 April 2015, 08:05 – Gang members talked before going to their van and driving away
- 4 April 2015, 21:17 – “Mr Ginger” went down into the vault, and was later joined by two other men
- 5 April 2015, 06:10 – The gang members drove away
- 7 April 2015 – Scotland Yard learnt that a burglary had taken place
- 10 April 2015 – The Daily Mirror released CCTV footage
- 19 May 2015 – The Metropolitan Police announced that they had arrested nine suspects
- 1 September 2015 – Hatton Garden Safe Deposit Company went into liquidation
- 28 March 2018 – Another man was arrested

== Arrests ==
On 19 May 2015, 76-year-old Brian Reader, who had previously been involved in laundering the proceeds of the Brink’s-Mat robbery, was arrested in connection with the burglary by Flying Squad officers.

In November 2015, Carl Wood, William Lincoln, Jon Harbinson and Hugh Doyle were all charged with conspiracy to commit burglary and conspiracy to conceal, convert or transfer criminal property. The theft was described as the “largest burglary in English legal history”.

Three years after the burglary, on 28 March 2018, Michael Seed, 57, was arrested after his home in Islington, London, had been searched. He was charged with conspiracy to burgle and conspiracy to conceal or disguise criminal property.

== Media coverage ==
Much of the early coverage was affectionate. No one had been hurt or threatened. It was a commercial premises, not a private house. Some of the people who had lost their diamonds and gold in the haul tried to explain that they kept their goods there purely for safe keeping and not to hide them from tax authorities, ex-wives or the police.

— Duncan Campbell, in The Guardian, 23 January 2016

== Sentencing ==
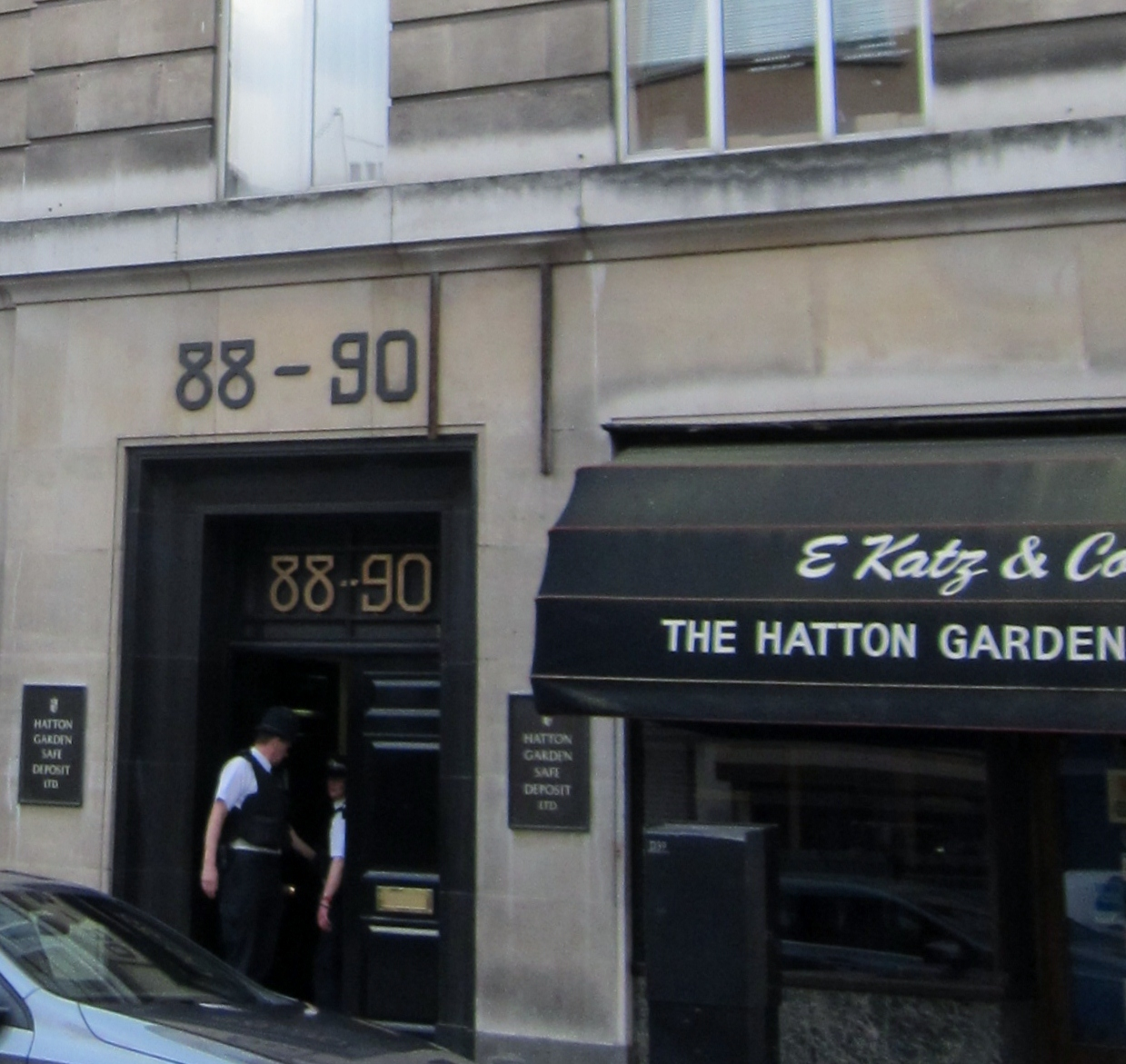
Police outside Hatton Garden Safe Deposit

On 9 March 2016, at Woolwich Crown Court, three members of the gang, John “Kenny” Collins, Daniel Jones, and Terry Perkins, having pleaded guilty to conspiracy to commit burglary, were each given a seven-year prison term.

Carl Wood and William Lincoln were found guilty of the same offence and also one count of conspiracy to conceal, convert or transfer criminal property, after trial. Lincoln was also given a seven-year sentence, and Wood was sentenced to six years.

Hugh Doyle was found guilty of concealing, converting or transferring criminal property. He was jailed for 21 months, suspended for two years. Doyle was also fined £367.50 for his general criminal conduct in January 2018.

The alleged ringleader, Brian Reader, was sentenced to six years and three months in prison on 21 March 2016.

An eighth man, Jon Harbinson, was found not guilty and discharged.

In January 2018, a confiscation ruling at Woolwich Crown Court ruled that John “Kenny” Collins, Daniel Jones, Terry Perkins and Brian Reader must pay a total of £27.5 million or face another seven years in prison. Perkins died in prison in February 2018, just a week after the ruling. On 14 August 2018, Daniel Jones had his sentence extended by six years and 287 days for failing to return £6,599,021. On 1 August 2019, Collins was sentenced to an additional 2,309 days for failing to comply with the confiscation order. It was revealed during the hearing that Collins had repaid £732,000 of the £7.6 million order. Enforcement action was said by the Crown Prosecution Service to be under way to seize Collins’ remaining assets.

On 15 March 2019, Michael Seed was found guilty of burglary and conspiracy to burgle and was sentenced to 10 years in prison for the former and eight years for the latter, the two running concurrently. On 1 October 2020, Seed was ordered to repay £6 million in damages or face an additional seven years in prison.

== In television, film and radio ==
The burglary attracted significant public interest and has been the subject of several dramatisations across film, television and radio.

The American investigative science series White Rabbit Project (2016) featured the burglary in its fifth episode, “Heist!”, in which presenter Grant Imahara investigated and demonstrated the methods used. The low-budget feature film Hatton Garden: the Heist (2016), starring Sidney Livingstone and Michael McKell, was the first dramatisation to be released. In 2017, Philip Palmer wrote The Hatton Garden Heist, a radio play broadcast on BBC Radio 4, and the feature film The Hatton Garden Job, with Larry Lamb and Phil Daniels, was also released that year.

The highest-profile adaptation was King of Thieves (2018), starring Michael Caine, Tom Courtenay, Jim Broadbent, Michael Gambon, Paul Whitehouse and Ray Winstone. A four-part ITV television serial, Hatton Garden (2019), starring Kenneth Cranham and Timothy Spall, was broadcast in May 2019 after being delayed for 18 months due to ongoing legal proceedings.

== See also ==
- Baker Street robbery (1971)
- Antwerp diamond heist (2003)
- List of heists in the United Kingdom
