= Baker Street robbery =

1971 burglary of a bank in London, England

Coordinates: 51°31′20.3″N 0°9′28.2″W

Route the burglars took into the vault

The Baker Street robbery was the burglary of safety deposit boxes at the Baker Street branch of Lloyds Bank in London, on the night of 11 September 1971. A gang tunnelled 40 feet (12 m) from a rented shop two doors away to come up through the floor of the vault. The value of the property stolen is unknown, but is likely to have been between £1.25 million and £3 million; (Note: £1.25 million in 1971 equates to approximately £15,799,000 and £3 million in 1971 equates to approximately £37,917,000 in 2025, according to calculations based on the Consumer Price Index measure of inflation.) only £231,000 was recovered by the police. (Note: £231,000 in 1971 equates to approximately £2,920,000 in 2025, according to calculations based on the Consumer Price Index measure of inflation.)

The burglary was planned by Anthony Gavin, a career criminal, who was inspired by "The Red-Headed League", a Sherlock Holmes short story in which criminals tunnel into a bank vault from the cellar of a nearby shop. Gavin and his colleagues rented Le Sac, a leather goods shop two doors from the bank, and tunnelled during weekends. The interior of the vault was mapped out by one gang member using an umbrella and the span of his arms to measure the dimensions and location of the furniture. The gang initially tried to use a jack to force a hole in the vault floor and when this failed they used a thermal lance. When this also failed to work, they used gelignite to blast a way through. Once inside, they emptied 268 safety deposit boxes. The gang had posted a lookout on a nearby roof, who was in contact via walkie-talkie, and their radio transmissions were accidentally overheard by Robert Rowlands, an amateur radio enthusiast. He called the police, who initially did not take him seriously, so he used a small cassette recorder to make a recording of the burglars' conversations. The second time he contacted the police they accepted what he was saying, and began hunting for the burglars while the break-in was in progress. They searched 750 banks in an 8-mile (13 km) radius, but failed to locate the gang.

Police found the members of the gang soon after the break-in; one of the burglars, Benjamin Wolfe, had signed the lease for Le Sac in his own name and informers provided information that led to Gavin. At the end of October 1971 police arrested Wolfe, Gavin, Reg Tucker and Thomas Stephens. They continued to search for other members of the gang, including one woman, for five years, but no further arrests were made. Gavin, Tucker and Stephens were sentenced to twelve years in prison; Wolfe received a sentence of eight years, less than the others as he was in his 60s.

There have been several rumours connected with the burglary, including one that the government issued a D-Notice to censor the press; that one of the safety deposit boxes contained compromising photographs of Princess Margaret and the actor and criminal John Bindon; and that photographs of a Conservative cabinet minister abusing children were found. There is no evidence to support these claims and they have been widely dismissed. Some of the rumours inspired the story for the 2008 film The Bank Job. Many of the papers relating to the burglary remain under embargo at the National Archives until January 2071.

== Background ==
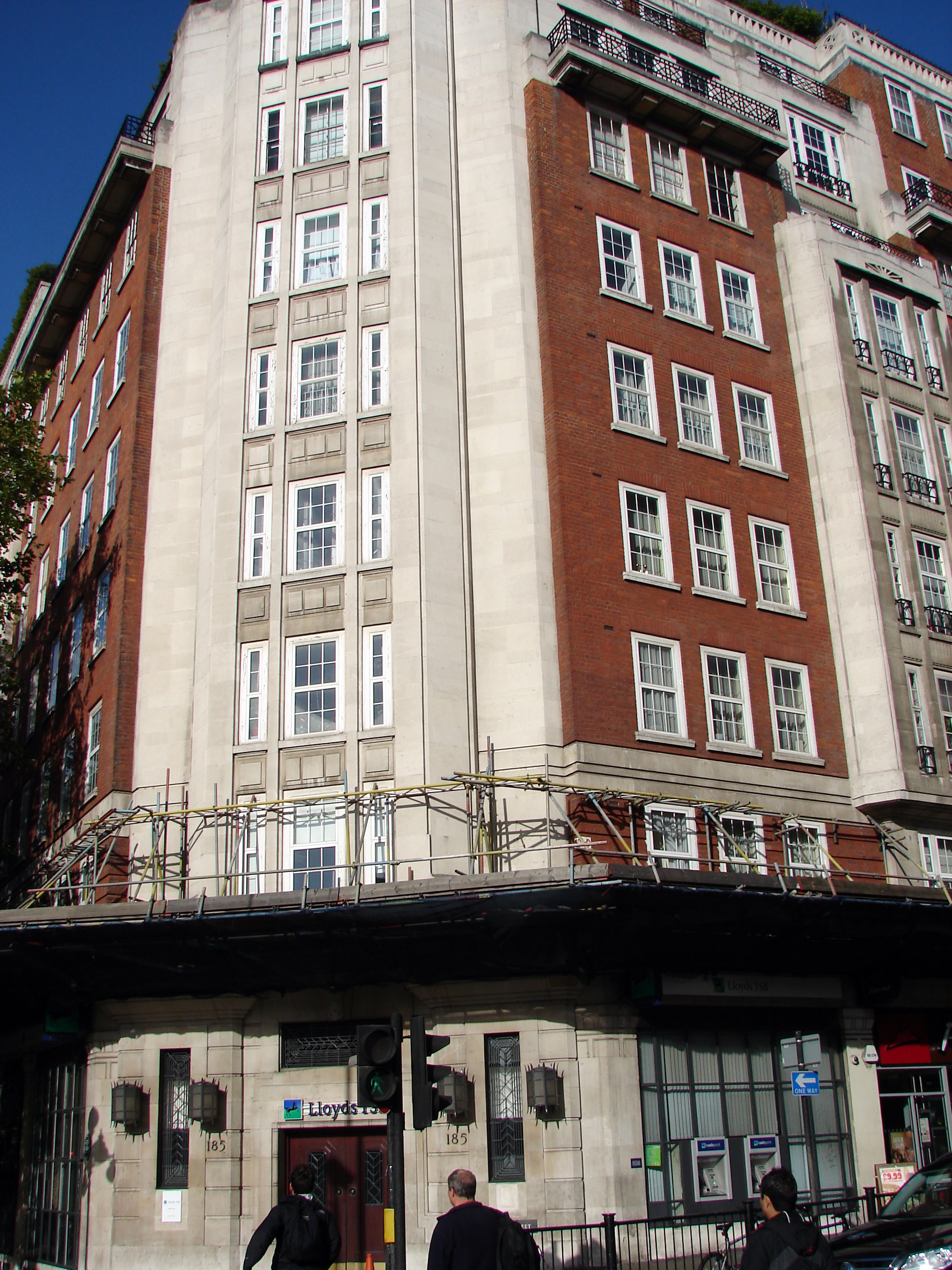
Lloyds Bank, 185 Baker Street

In 1970 Anthony Gavin, a 38-year-old photographer from North London, began planning the burglary of the branch of Lloyds Bank at 185 Baker Street, in the Marylebone district of the City of Westminster, London. His plan was inspired by "The Red-Headed League", an 1891 Sherlock Holmes story in which criminals tunnel into a bank vault from the cellar of a nearby shop. (Note: The bank Gavin robbed was one block down from Holmes's fictional address, 221B Baker Street.) A former army physical training instructor with connections to several career criminals, Gavin is described by the journalists Tom Pettifor and Nick Sommerlad as "a forceful personality ... [who] had the propensity to be physically threatening". According to Paul Lashmar, the head of journalism at the University of Sussex, Gavin was a member of a gang headed by Brian Reader, who was also involved in the burglary, (Note: Reader, another career criminal, was later involved in the 1983 Brink's-Mat robbery and 2015 Hatton Garden safe deposit burglary, and was present when Kenneth Noye fatally stabbed Detective Constable John Fordham in 1985. In the last of these Reader played no part in the stabbing and ran away shortly afterwards; both he and Noye claimed they acted in self defence and they were acquitted.) although Reader firmly denies that he had any involvement in the events at Baker Street.

== Prelude ==
Gavin asked Reg Tucker, a second-hand car salesman who had no criminal record, to reconnoitre the bank. Tucker opened an account with £500 in December 1970 and two months later he rented a safety deposit box in the branch; over the next few months he visited his box thirteen times. Bank practice of the time was for staff to leave customers in private while visiting the vault. As soon as Tucker was alone, he would measure the room using the span of his arms and an umbrella he brought with him; he was aided in getting exact measurements by the regularly sized floor tiles, each of which was nine inches (23 cm) square. He drew a map of the room, plotting where the cabinets were and the position of the furniture. Thomas Stephens, another second-hand car salesman with no criminal record, was used to acquire the tools needed for the break-in, including a thermal lance and a 100-ton jack; one of Reader's friends, Bobby Mills, was employed to be the lookout man. Two others were brought in for the job, one of whom was an explosives expert. Another of Gavin's friends, Mickey "Skinny" Gervaise, a burglar-alarm expert, was brought on board, as were two men who have never been identified: "Little Legs" and "TH". Lashmar reports that TH was a contact of Detective Inspector Alec Eist, whom he describes as "by reputation the most corrupt Yard officer of the 1950s to mid-1970s". The journalist Duncan Campbell describes Eist as "One of the most active bent officers from the 1950s to the 1970s". (Note: "Bent" is slang for corrupt or criminal.)

In May 1971 the owners of the leather goods shop Le Sac at 189 Baker Street—two doors down from the bank—sold the lease of the premises for £10,000 to Benjamin Wolfe, a 64-year-old seller of ornaments and knick-knacks, and a contact of several gang members. (Note: £10,000 in 1971 equates to approximately £126,000 in 2025, according to calculations based on the Consumer Price Index measure of inflation.) The building had a basement that, the group calculated, was at the same level as the bank vault.

== Burglary ==
The spoil and equipment left in Le Sac after the burglary

Road works nearby meant the trembler alarms in the vault floor were turned off after several false alarms. A member of the local security company alerted the gang of the timing of the digging and when the alarms were off. Work began on the tunnel on the Friday evening of the August bank holiday 1971 and continued until 10 September 1971. To avoid being overheard, they dug only during the weekends. Gavin led the digging of the tunnel from Le Sac to under the vault floor. He later said that he lost 2 stone (28 lb; 13 kg) in the process. The entry hole he, Tucker and a third gang member created in Le Sac was 15 inches (38 cm) wide and through 6 inches (15 cm) of concrete. Gavin dug until he reached the walls of the Chicken Inn's basement, then dug down and continued under the building, using their basement floor as the roof of the tunnel. The tunnel was 40 feet (12 m) long when finished, and at the end, under the vault, the gang created a cavity 7 by 4 by 5 feet (2.1 by 1.2 by 1.5 m). The digging created 8 long tons (8.1 t) of waste, which was hauled back into Le Sac and dumped towards the rear of the premises. The tunnel, which needed no supports, was later described in court as "a magnificent piece of engineering".

The gang began their entry into the vault on Friday 10 September, after the bank closed for the weekend. The gang placed a lookout man on a rooftop overlooking the bank, and kept in contact by using walkie-talkies. Their intention was to use the 100-ton jack to force a hole in the 3-foot-thick (0.91 m) reinforced concrete floor, and railway sleepers were laid on the floor to support it. What they did not know was that there was an old well under where the tunnel ended, and the pressure of the jack pushed the bottom of their tunnel down into the well, rather than raising the vault's floor upwards. The gang then used the thermic lance in an attempt to cut through the floor; when this failed they drilled holes in the underside of the vault floor and packed them with gelignite. On Saturday the gang co-ordinated the blast of the explosives with the movement of traffic in the area to mask the noise. A 12-inch-wide (30 cm) hole was blasted through the floor and into the vault. The tunnel was cleared of the debris created, and the hole was widened with a hammer and chisel. By the time they had finished, the exit of the tunnel measured 12 by 14 inches (30 by 36 cm).

At around 11:00 pm on Saturday 11 September Robert Rowlands, an amateur radio enthusiast living in a flat in Wimpole Street, half a mile (800 m) away from the Lloyds branch, picked up the walkie-talkie conversations of the gang. He heard comments over the radio that made him think a local cigarette shop was being burgled. At 11:30 pm, he phoned the police; the local police officer thought it was a prank call, and told Rowlands that he should record the conversation if anything interesting was overheard. Rowlands thought it was a good idea, so used a small cassette recorder to make a record of the conversations. At around midnight he recorded dialogue between the gang inside the shop and the nearby lookout about their need to take a break:

First voice: Right, well listen carefully. We want you to mind for one hour from now until approximately one o'clock and then to go off the air, get some sleep and come on the air with both radios at six o'clock in the morning.

Second voice: I suggest we carry on tonight, mate, and get it done with.

First voice: Look, the place is filled with fumes where we was cutting. And if the Security come in and smell the fumes we are all going to take stoppo and none of us have got nothing. Whereas this way we have all got 300 grand to cut up when we come back in the morning. And if Security have naused it for us, well at least we have got something. (Note: "naused" is slang for to ruin or mess up.)

The disagreement between the lookout and gang continued for a while, and the lookout said "Money may be your God, but it's not mine, and I'm fucking off!" Eventually, after input from a woman's voice and a fourth person who seemed to carry more sway than the others, the lookout agreed to remain on the roof overnight. The lookout man was also given an update on the progress they had made in opening the safety deposit boxes: "We have done 90 per cent of the easy ones and we now face the hard ones."

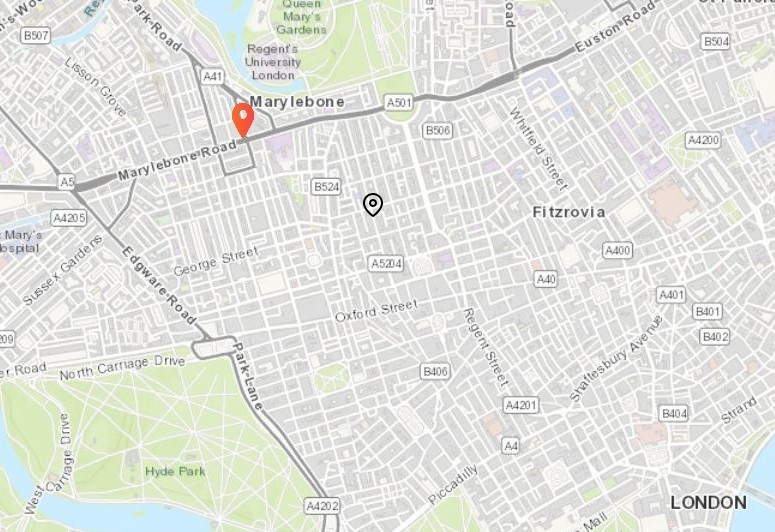
Relevant locations for the burglary: – Lloyds Bank, 185 Baker Street – Approximate location of Robert Rowlands's flat in Wimpole Street

At 2:00 am Rowlands decided he had enough material recorded to call the police again; he did not recontact his local station, but phoned Scotland Yard directly. Scotland Yard sent members of the Flying Squad to listen to the tapes, and they confirmed that they thought a burglary was taking place. The officers stayed with Rowlands until 8:30 am on Sunday 12 September when the gang returned to the shop and radioed the lookout. One of the gang members in the shop thanked him for staying on the roof all night and informed him that they planned to finish the job early that afternoon. At one stage in the morning a waiter from the Chicken Inn restaurant heard noises from within the bank and peered through the windows of the building to see if anything could be seen. Shortly afterwards Rowlands and listening policemen heard the final radio transmission "Would you like to change to the other channel, over". Rowlands thinks this was the code for leaving the bank.

Police contacted bank staff and local security firms to open up their branches as they began to check 750 banks in an 8-mile (13 km) radius. Each branch was visited by both bank staff and police. They visited the Baker Street branch of Lloyds at 3:30 pm on 12 September. They found the vault secure; they were unable to open the vault to check as it was time locked. It is not known if the gang were still in the vault at the time, although police suspect that they were, but keeping quiet following a warning from the lookout.

During the burglary 268 safety deposit boxes were opened, about a quarter of the boxes present; the gang did not try to crack the bank's safe. Lord Hailsham owned one of the boxes in the bank; at the time of the robbery he was Lord Chancellor, the most senior member of the judiciary. Estimates of the amounts stolen vary between £150,000 and nearly £4 million. (Note: £150,000 to £4 million in 1971 equates to approximately £1,896,000 to £50,555,000, according to calculations based on the Consumer Price Index measure of inflation.) (Note: Newspapers and later publications provided the following estimates: £150,000 – 3 million; £500,000; £1 million; £1 million "or more"; £1.25 million; £1.5 million; £3 million; £3.5 million; Nearly £4 million.) Because of the way the gang communicated the burglary was soon nicknamed "the walkie-talkie job". Although the common name for the events is the "Baker Street Robbery", it is legally defined as a burglary. A Dictionary of Law by the Oxford University Press defines robbery as "The offence of using force against any person, or putting them in fear of being subjected to force, in order to commit a theft"; burglary is defined as "The offence, under the Theft Act 1968, of ... entering a building ... with the intention of committing one of three specified crimes in it ... [including] theft."

== Aftermath ==
=== Investigation ===
Initially a news blackout was imposed on the radio messages to avoid letting the burglars know their conversations had been overheard by the police, but this was lifted by Monday 13 September. On that morning bank staff opened the vault and found that they had been burgled. Police found the thermal lance, walkie-talkies and other tools, including an oxyacetylene torch, in the shop. Eight hundred pieces of evidence were logged and forensically examined. Police announced that they were searching for four men and a woman. They thought that during the burglary the woman was acting as a controller, based in a different location to the lookout and the gang. The police later widened their search to include five others. The bank provided the police with the names of 260 box owners; eight others refused to allow their names to be passed on.

Up to 120 detectives worked on the case, organised into four teams: one examining the scene, one contacting the known safety box owners, one covering the co-ordination from the control centre and one team dealing with all external enquiries. Police soon identified Wolfe from the lease documents, and within four days the police had a list of likely suspects that they were investigating. Informers provided the first names of two of the gang members and incomplete details of a pub that had been taken over by another member. Police made the connection between a newly acquired pub and Gavin. After several weeks of surveillance and investigation police had identified Wolfe, Gavin, Stephens and Tucker as the key individuals to arrest, but they also wanted to speak to three or four other people who they thought were involved. One of those they were interested in had been living in France and Italy since October 1971; there were no extradition agreements in place to request overseas police arrange for his return to Britain.

Towards the end of October 1971 police surveillance teams saw Tucker hand over a bag to two men, Abdullah Hashan Gangji and his nephew Ackbar Mohammad Ali Gangji. The two were arrested and £32,000 of notes were seized. Wolfe, Gavin, Stephens and Tucker were also picked up within the next two days. Police recovered £231,000 they identified as stolen from the vault. (Note: £231,000 in 1973 equates to approximately £2,512,000 in 2025, according to calculations based on the Consumer Price Index measure of inflation.)

After the end of the investigation Scotland Yard considered prosecuting Rowlands under the Wireless Telegraphy Act 1967 for listening to unlicensed transmissions, but no charges were laid against him. Shortly after the court case, Lloyds Bank sent him a cheque for £2,500 to thank him for his actions. (Note: £2,500 in 1973 equates to approximately £27,000 in 2025, according to calculations based on the Consumer Price Index measure of inflation.)

=== Court case ===
The two Gangjis were remanded in custody until 16 November, when bail was set at £75,000. (Note: £75,000 in 1971 equates to approximately £948,000 in 2025, according to calculations based on the Consumer Price Index measure of inflation.) Tucker, Gavin and Stephens were all remanded on bail of £30,000 each on charges relating to the break-in. (Note: £30,000 in 1971 equates to approximately £379,000 in 2025, according to calculations based on the Consumer Price Index measure of inflation.) Shortly afterwards the bank's insurers offered a £30,000 reward for information that would lead to more arrests.

The trial of the four gang members and the two Gangjis opened on 2 January 1973. Stephens, Tucker, Wolfe and Gavin were charged with breaking into the bank and stealing the contents of the security boxes—valued at a minimum of £1.5 million—and of possessing explosives; the two Gangjis were charged with handling stolen goods. Stephens, Tucker and Gavin pleaded guilty, Wolfe and the two Gangjis pleaded not guilty. The two Gangjis stated that they were acting as couriers for a Swiss-based finance house involved in purchasing sterling. Wolfe claimed that after he signed the lease for Le Sac, he had only returned to the shop once, to pick up the post, and that he was shocked to hear the news about the break-in. The trial ended on 23 January 1973 and sentences were handed down three days later. The two Gangjis were found not guilty, Stephens, Tucker and Gavin were each given sentences of twelve years; Wolfe received eight years—shorter than the others on account of his age.

=== Lloyds ===
In March 1973, 64 of those whose safety deposit boxes had been broken into sued Lloyds for £500,000. (Note: £500,000 in 1973 equates to approximately £5,437,000 in 2025, according to calculations based on the Consumer Price Index measure of inflation.) The case opened in the High Court in 1977, by which time there were 138 plaintiffs seeking damages of £660,000. (Note: £660,000 in 1977 equates to approximately £3,878,000 in 2025, according to calculations based on the Consumer Price Index measure of inflation.) One witness, a retired jeweller, recounted how he identified some of his property that had been recovered by police. He walked around tables laid out at the bank, on which several items were placed; he and twenty other people were unsupervised while they did this. He noticed a single diamond that could easily have been stolen, which he estimated was worth between £3,000 and £4,000 at the 1971 price. (Note: £3,000 to 4,000 in 1971 equates to approximately £38,000 to £51,000 in 2025, according to calculations based on the Consumer Price Index measure of inflation.) Another customer complained that he saw a ring in a wastepaper bin, that it was too easy to steal some of the smaller items, if one wished, and that one of the bank assistants had told him that two people had tried to claim the same pair of candlesticks. Four days into the trial, the judge visited the bank and the rooms where the property had been on show. The following day he adjourned the case; no reason was given and no date to resume proceedings was set.

== Rumours ==
There have been several rumours circulating about the burglary. One is that the government issued a D-Notice—a formal request that the media not publish a story on a specific subject for reasons of national security—to stop any news being released. The claim is dismissed by Duncan Campbell who writes "no D-Notice was even requested, far less granted"; the journalist Graeme McLagen observes that there was a news embargo on the Sunday—while the burglary was still in progress—but that the events were widely reported over the following days. Another rumour is that one of the safety deposit boxes contained compromising photographs of Princess Margaret and the actor and criminal John Bindon. Campbell describes the story as "cheerful nonsense". A third rumour is that photographs of a Conservative cabinet minister abusing children were discovered by the gang and left behind for the police to find, but no action was taken.

== Legacy ==
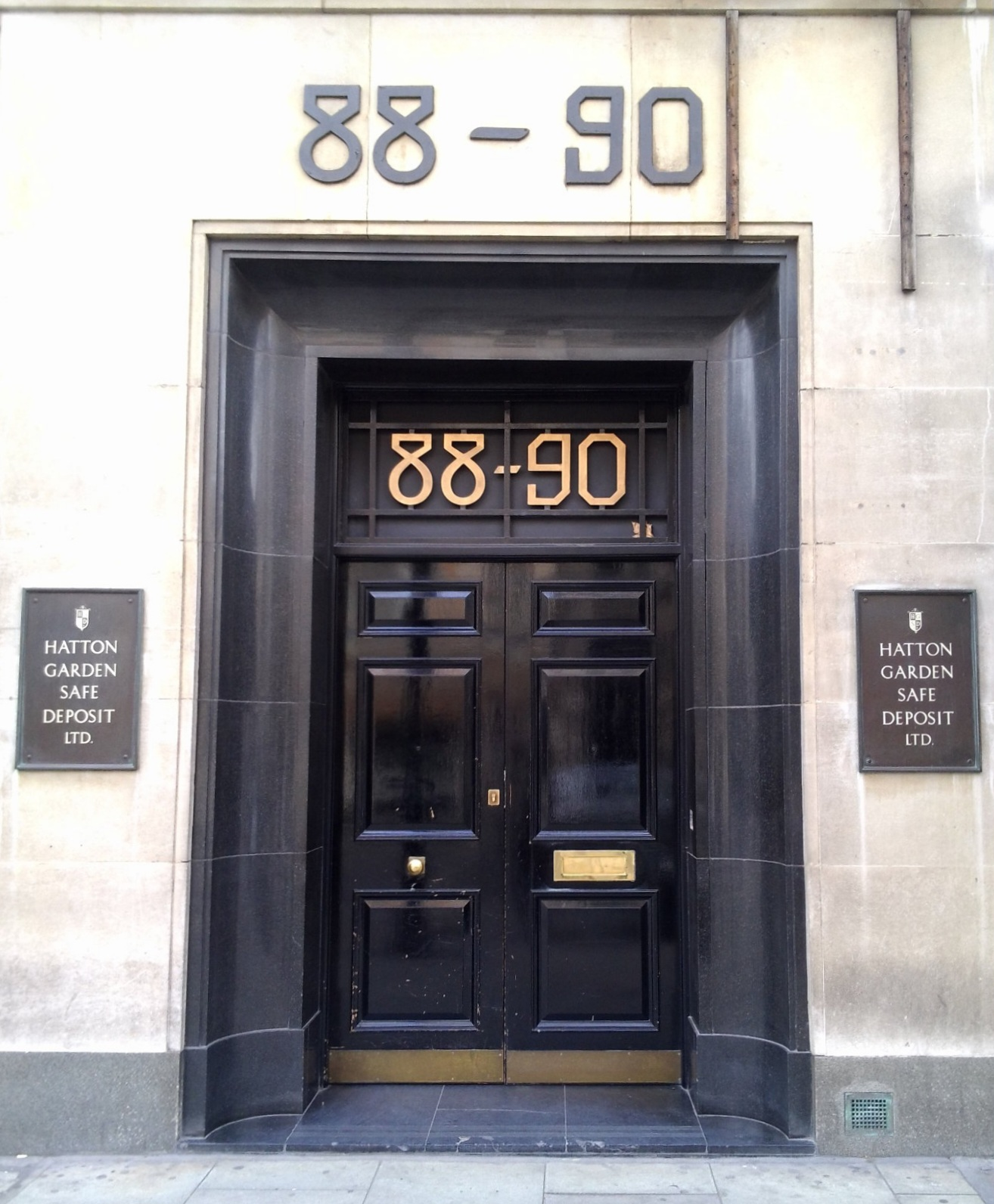
Scene of the Hatton Garden safe deposit burglary in 2015

In 1976 James Humphreys, a Soho-based pornographer and strip club owner, alleged that police officers had stolen £1 million worth of gems "as their share" of the burglary. The following year Commander Bert Wickstead, a senior officer at Scotland Yard, was appointed to head an inquiry into the allegations.

In 2011 The Baker Street Robbery, a documentary on the burglary, was broadcast on The History Channel; the programme included an interview with Robert Rowlands and the recordings he made of the robbery. In 2023 the History channel series History's Greatest Heists used dramatised re-enactments in a documentary of the robbery. A fictionalised version of the burglary is the subject of the 2008 film The Bank Job, which uses the storyline that the crime was either set up—or later covered up—by MI5 to secure the compromising photographs of Princess Margaret, that were being kept in a deposit box at the bank by Trinidadian radical Michael X. The advertising for the film played up many of the rumours, both fuelling and reinforcing them:

[the gang] ... looted safe deposit boxes of cash and jewellery worth millions and millions of pounds. None of it was recovered. Nobody was ever arrested. The robbery made headlines for a few days and then disappeared – the result of a UK Government "D" Notice, gagging the press. This film reveals what was hidden in those boxes. The story involves murder, corruption and a sex scandal with links to the Royal Family – a story in which the thieves were the most innocent people involved.

The 2015 Hatton Garden safe deposit burglary bears a close resemblance to the break-in at Baker Street. It was headed by Brian Reader, was carried out over a weekend and involved breaking into a vault containing safety deposit boxes, although in this case the burglars used a heavy-duty drill to enter through a wall.

Although many of the records relating to the burglary at the bank were released by the National Archives in 2013, approximately 800 pages of information remain closed; they are scheduled to become available for viewing in January 2071.

== See also ==
- List of missing treasures
- List of heists in the United Kingdom

== Notes and references ==
=== Sources ===
==== Books ====
- Bowers, Gordon (2016). The Great Diamond Heist – The Incredible True Story of the Hatton Garden Diamond Geezers. London: John Blake. ISBN 978-1-78606-078-5.
- Campbell, Duncan (2019). Underworld: The Definitive History of Britain's Organised Crime (Kindle ed.). London: Ebury Publishing. ISBN 978-1-4735-6609-5.
- Clarkson, Wensley (2016). Sexy Beasts: The Inside Story of the Hatton Garden Heist. London: Quercus. ISBN 978-1-78429-815-9.
- Dalzell, Tom; Victor, Terry (2015). The New Partridge Dictionary of Slang and Unconventional English. Abingdon, Oxfordshire: Routledge. ISBN 978-1-317-37252-3.
- Morris, Jim (2017). The Who's Who of British Crime in the Twentieth Century. Stroud, Gloucestershire: Amberley Publishing. ISBN 978-1-4456-7202-1.
- Pettifor, Tom; Sommerlad, Nick (2016). One Last Job. London: Mirror Books. ISBN 978-1-910335-45-1.
- Woodland, David I. (2015). Crime and Corruption at The Yard: Downfall of Scotland Yard. Barnsley, South Yorkshire: Pen and Sword. ISBN 978-1-4738-3385-2.

==== News sources ====
- "12 Yard men in the dock". The Guardian. 1 March 1976. p. 26.
- "£1.5m tunnel theft from London bank was 'in the style of a Sherlock Holmes short story'". The Times. 3 January 1973. p. 3.
- "£30,000 bail for man on bank raid charge". The Times. 30 November 1971. p. 4.
- "£30,000 bail for raid charge men". The Times. 7 December 1971. p. 3.
- "£30,000 reward offer". The Times. 28 November 1971. p. 2.
- "Accused tells of 'shock' over £1.5m bank raid". The Times. 6 January 1973. p. 2.
- "Back to Mr Holmes for bank robbery—in Baker Street". The Guardian. 3 January 1973. p. 7.
- "Bank raid inquiry". The Times. 10 October 1977. p. 2.
- "Bank hearing adjourned". The Guardian. 15 October 1977. p. 2.
- Borrell, Clive (14 September 1971). "Bank raiders get thousands after radio ham warning and police check". The Times. p. 1.
- Borrell, Clive (27 January 1973). "Four jailed for London's biggest bank theft". The Times. p. 1.
- "The courts: Unsafe deposits". The Guardian. 1 October 1977. p. 9.
- Campbell, Duncan (9 April 2013). "The Great Train Robbery: Why do we have such a peculiar romantic fondness for thieves?". The New Statesman.
- Campbell, Duncan (23 January 2016). "One last job: the inside story of the Hatton Garden heist". The Guardian.
- "Ethereal dialogue from a fume-filled vault". The Times. 14 September 1971. p. 4.
- Ezard, John (14 September 1971a). "Police inquiry into 'missed' bank raid". The Guardian. p. 1.
- Ezard, John (15 September 1971b). "Four are sought after big raid". The Guardian. p. 28.
- "Five on bank raid charges". The Guardian. 2 November 1971. p. 7.
- Harvey, Peter (27 January 1973). "The £3M haul of Mr Big". The Guardian. p. 1.
- Heimbrod, Camille (23 December 2018). "Princess Margaret Love Affair Reportedly Linked To Bank Robbery". International Business Times.
- Johnston, Ian (18 January 2016). "Hatton Garden Heist: burglar 'found evidence of Tory minister abusing children' in previous robbery". The Independent.
- "Judge will visit scene of bank raid today". The Times. 13 October 1977. p. 2.
- Lashmar, Paul (16 January 2016). "Exposed: Hatton Garden raider's role in Britain's biggest bank job". The Independent. p. 10.
- Lawrence, Will (15 February 2008). "Revisiting the riddle of Baker Street". The Daily Telegraph. Archived from the original on 23 January 2018.
- "Men on notes charge get bail of £75,000". The Times. 16 November 1971. p. 5.
- "'Negligence' claims on bank over £3m raid". The Times. 11 October 1977. p. 4.
- "Raided bank is sued". The Observer. 18 March 1973. p. 3.
- "Self preservation societies: a brief history of heists". The Daily Telegraph.
- "Sorting of gems 'like a market'". The Guardian. 13 October 1977. p. 3.
- Tendler, Stewart (2 February 1976). "Yard corruption inquiry nearing end". The Times. p. 1.
- Thorpe, Vanessa (11 March 2007). "Untold story of Baker Street bank robbery: Film uses informer's revelations on unsolved 1971 crime". The Observer. p. 17.
- "Three are charged with £1,250,000 bank raid". The Times. 2 November 1971. p. 4.
- "Two not guilty of handling". The Guardian. 24 January 1973. p. 7.
- "Why 'true crime' is a hard job to pull off". The Irish Times. 1 March 2008. p. 6.
- "Yard inquiry into 'let down' over bank raid". The Times. 14 September 1971. p. 4.

==== Internet ====
- "The Bank Job". Empire Cinemas.
- "Benjamin Wolfe, Thomas Gray Stephen, Reginald Samuel Tucker and Anthony Gavin: convicted..." The National Archives.
- "British Council Film: The Bank Job". The British Council. 17 December 2008.
- Clark, Gregory (2018). "The Annual RPI and Average Earnings for Britain, 1209 to Present (New Series)". MeasuringWorth.
- "Closed extracts: Approximately 800 pages". The National Archives.
- "Helping Britain Prosper 1765–2015" (PDF). Lloyds Banking Group. January 2015. ISBN 978-0-9506-7599-2.
- Law, Jonathan, ed. (2018). "burglary". A Dictionary of Law. Oxford University Press.
- Law, Jonathan, ed. (2018). "robbery". A Dictionary of Law. Oxford University Press.
- "Tuesday, Feb. 21: 'History's Greatest Heists With Pierce Brosnan' Revisits the 1971 Lloyds Bank Robbery". Channel Guide Magazine. 21 February 2023.

==== Other ====
- The Baker Street Robbery (DVD cover). Title Role Productions. 2013.
- The Baker Street Robbery (Television production). Britain's Biggest Heists. History Channel. 2011.
