= Brian Reader (criminal) =

British gangster and robber (1939–2023)

- Born: 28 February 1939; Lewisham, England
- Died: September 2023 (aged 84); Dartford, Kent, England
- Occupation: Robber
- Years active: 1950–2016
- Known for: Hatton Garden heist
- Spouse: Lyn
- Children: Brian ("Paul") Reader
- Relatives: Colin Reader (brother)
- Status: Released
- Criminal charges: Robbery; Fraud; Money laundering
- Penalty: Multiple

Brian Henry Reader (28 February 1939 – September 2023) was a British gangster, who has been described as "one of the busiest crooks in the British underworld", and a "ringleader" of the Hatton Garden safe deposit burglary in 2015.

== Early life and career ==
Born in Cressingham Road, Lewisham, on 28 February 1939, to Henry and Doris Reader, his father fought in World War II but had deserted his family by 1955. Reader would later tell how his first experience in crime was thieving-to-order from the South London docks, (Note: Professor Dick Hobbs has described the South London docks as "like going to Eton" for men such as Reader, saying "it was the blagger docks. All the dockland areas produced the top villains in London, particularly on the south side. Along with Reader, you had the Richardsons, Freddie Foreman, Frankie Fraser, the Brindle family ... it goes on and on. For someone like Brian Reader, it was like going to Eton.") an occupation he learned from Henry, who both worked and stole there. Reader first appeared in court in 1950 when he robbed five shops in East London, aged 11. Accused of "stealing tins of fruit by means of store breaking", he received a criminal discharge. As a child, he had a variety of local jobs such as butcher's boy, until he left school at 16 and joined British Rail as a fireman. However, he was soon in court again, this time charged with stealing £4 15s. 6d. from a beach hut in Brighton, for which he was given another discharge.

=== Early career ===
In late 1958, Reader made his first appearance at the Old Bailey, which the investigative journalists Tom Pettifor and Nick Sommerlad have said "mark[ed] a serious escalation in his offending". He received a relatively light sentence for several offences of grievous bodily harm with intent. Perhaps because of this escalation in his crimes, his mother arranged for him to enter National Service. Posted with the Royal Engineers, he was based in West London, and this allowed him to return home every night. Discharged from the army the following year, his character was assessed as "good". Around this time, Reader made the "conscious decision" to earn a criminal living—notwithstanding his recent purchase of a dump truck with which to enter the haulage industry—and was soon fined for possession of an offensive weapon.

By the 1960s, Reader was working with what investigator Paul Lashmar has called "a flexible group of Britain's top robbers and burglars", responsible for the theft of millions. The gang comprised men such as Tony Hollands, a safe-cracker, John Woodley, an expert "alarm man", and John Goodwin, an intelligence gatherer. Others included a lock picker and journalist. Lashmar further described them as "the best group of burglars in the country. This was the London team. The Old Bill knew about them, but they were pretty careful." By now Reader had also established himself as a fence as well as a burglar. He particularly specialised in selling on stolen jewellery through the less ethical traders in Hatton Garden. Reader was busy enough planning, meeting and surveying jobs that he complained to a compadre that he "never got a day off". Although the vast majority of Reader's crimes at this time are today unknown, some, such as the Albemarle Street post office—which gained Reader's gang £500,000—are known to have put him near the top of a wide-ranging underground black market network.

== Later career ==
In May 1971, Reader was almost killed planning a bank robbery in Reading, Berkshire. Having broken into the local telephone exchange—through which banks' burglar alarms to local police stations were routed—he was interrupted by the local constabulary. Attempting to escape out of a window, he slipped, fell, and landed on his head, recovering consciousness under a police guard in hospital. Suffering minor brain damage, Reader had to learn to walk again due to his sense of balance having been badly affected. Later in the month, he was convicted of burglary with intent and fined £35 at the Magistrates' Court.

=== Baker Street robbery ===
Having only left hospital a few weeks earlier, in September 1971, over two weekends, Reader took part in another robbery. The target was another bank: this time, the Baker Street branch of Lloyds Bank. It was Reader's biggest job yet, and for the first time he appears to have led the gang himself. Reader brought in an old friend from his youth, Bobby Mills, though, and this appears to have caused friction with established members of the gang, some of whom thought Mills a liability with no area of expertise. Ultimately Mills proved an embarrassment to Reader, as he refused to enter the bank—supposedly on doctor's orders—and so was made a look out instead. He continued causing problems in this capacity also. Firstly he claimed that he needed over eight hours sleep a night and later stated that, in any case, that would be impossible on the roof "cos it's freezing cold and everything up here now". The robbery involved tunnelling from two doors down and breaking into the bank vault from below. They successfully emptied hundreds of safe deposit boxes and escaped with over £8 million. Given their "strikingly similar" modi operandi—including tunnelling—Lashmar has credited the Baker Street robbery as acting as a blueprint for the Hatton Garden heist over 40 years later. Reader, he says, "was key to both". Reader later claimed to have found several paedophiliac photos in one of the boxes, which he believed to have been owned by an unnamed but prominent Conservative Party Member of Parliament and cabinet member. (Note: A companion later recalled, "nothing was ever done", although in 2008 the incident was reported to have been passed from the government for investigation by the Independent Inquiry into Child Sexual Abuse.) He left the photos scattered around the floor to ensure they could not be missed by the police. Pettifor and Sommerlad argue that "not for the last time, Reader and his cronies were causing the Met acute embarrassment". Only three members of the gang were ever brought to book for the robbery. Reader escaped to Spain with his wife and two children, although not before discovering that one member had conned him and the rest of the gang out of £150,000. It has been speculated that corrupt police officers enabled Reader's escape abroad, and this probably included Detective Inspector Alec Eist, who was "by reputation the most corrupt Yard officer of the 1950s to mid-1970s which was no small achievement in such a packed field".

In 1974 Reader was offered the chance to take part in the robbery of the Bank of America in Mayfair, which he turned down due to his not trusting other gang members. (Note: Pettifor and Sommerlad suggest that this was probably the right decision, considering that the majority of the gang were soon caught. Between them, they received 100 years in jail.) It is likely, although unproven, that Reader bribed police officers when he had to, as the practice was extensive in the 1970s. Reader managed to stay out of jail until 1980, mostly avoiding arrest fleeing abroad whenever he suspected the police were close to him.

By the mid-1980s, now living in Grove Park, Reader fenced some gold with Kenneth Noye, which brought them both around £200,000. The following year, Reader was tried for complicity in several robberies with John Godwin, which netted them £1.3 million, but the trial collapsed after allegations of jury tampering. At the later "jury-nobbling trial", as it was dubbed in the media, one witness told how she was visited by two men offered £500, and asked to influence a fellow juror. One of these men was Godwin, and the other "was called Brian and that she had never seen him again". A contemporary "supergrass", Michael Gervaise, also stated that police had asked him to implicate Reader in his statements. Although a retrial was ordered, Reader and his wife Lyn went to Spain. This was to become a familiar technique of Reader's and one he employed whenever he felt the police closing in on him; by escaping abroad at short notice, he was able to keep his criminal record relatively clean. (Note: For much of this period, no extradition treaty existed between Spain and the UK, giving rise to Costa del Sol being given the epithet of "Costa del Crime", on account of the numerous British villains that owned villas there.) The year after leaving for Spain, Reader surreptitiously returned to England due to a family illness. However his return did not go unnoticed, and he was re-arrested.

However, in 1980 he was named in a supergrass trial, arrested and bailed for £40,000. On the day he was due to appear in court he escaped by telling the clerk "I'm off to park my car", and promptly disappeared back to Spain via Dover and France. Reader returned in 1983 by way of an associate's private yacht to Jersey and on to Britain where he took part in the turning over of another Lloyd's Bank, at Holborn Circus.

=== Brink's-Mat and death of DC Fordham ===
In November 1983, the Brink's-Mat robbery occurred at the Heathrow International Trading Estate. It was one of the largest robberies in British history, with approximately £26 million (Note: £26 million in 1983 equates to approximately £88,400,000 in 2025, according to calculations based on the Consumer Price Index measure of inflation.) worth of gold bullion, diamonds, and cash being stolen. Reader was subsequently convicted of handling stolen goods and money laundering. He was jailed for eight years and was also convicted of fraudulently conspiring to evade VAT. He received a further year in prison after it was discovered he had dishonestly handled another £66,000.

Although they had taken no part in the robbery itself, they were involved in what has been called its "bloody aftermath" as the robbers attempted to fence the gold. Author Wensley Clarkson has suggested that Noye and Reader had, by now "taught themselves everything there was to know about gold". (Note: Not only due to its intrinsic value but because of the ease with which it could facilitate VAT frauds at the same time.) They renewed their acquaintance playing squash at Brenda Noye's club in Dartford, and here they set the price of the gold and established sale terms. While the terms were not particularly profitable to Reader as a fence, "it was clear a VAT fraud was being carried out" to go towards making up for it. Reader regularly stayed around gangster Kenneth Noye's house, and was later described by Justice Lowry as Noye's "vigorous right-hand man"; they had grown up close to one another in Southeast London. Suspicion had coalesced on Noye over Brink's-Mat, and he was under constant police surveillance, as was his house in West Kingsdown, Kent.

By early January 1985, Reader had personally processed £3.66 million of Brink's-Mat gold. On the night of Saturday, 26 January 1985, around 6.30 PM, Reader was with Noye and his wife. Chief superintendent Brian Boyce, responsible for the gold hunt, later said it was Reader's arrival—as a "known fugitive from justice"—at Noye's house that forced him to launch a covert search of Noye's grounds that night. Boyce was already uncertain as to the precise number of transactions that Reader had carried out, as in many cases, he had received parcels in return. This confused the case against Reader to some degree.

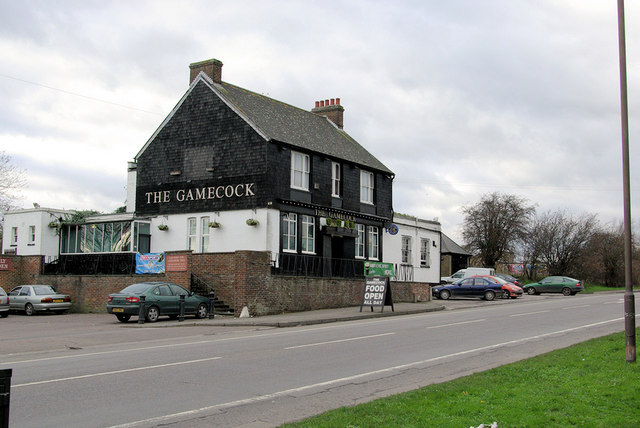
The Gamecock pub, West Kingsdown, where Reader was arrested attempting to hitchike in January 1986.

Fordham and a colleague thus entered the property by way of a convenient tree. When the Noyes' two dogs began barking, Reader accompanied Noye into the garden on the night Metropolitan Police Constable John Fordham was stabbed 12 times to death in Noye's garden. Fordham was part of the investigation into the Brinks-Mat robbery and was carrying out close-quarters surveillance on Noye, possibly looking for signs of bullion in Noye's grounds. By the time Fordham was on the ground, and Noye ran back to the house, his wife had collected a shotgun from the cabinet and was loading it as she came downstairs. Reader took the gun from her.

Reader's role was as a go-between between Noye and John Palmer who was smelting and moving the gold bullion. Reader travelled between Noye's house and Bristol Airport—where transport abroad awaited it—approximately 30 times in 1984. Reader possessed multiple vehicles in which to make the journey. Aware that he was being kept under police surveillance, Reader regularly drew his tails on a wild-goose chase; he also went on dummy runs, swapped cars en route, and performed u-turns to throw off potential followers. He and other conspirators met in a variety of locations, including Bexleyheath pub car parks, the Royal National Hotel in Bloomsbury, Farringdon cafes, and a fish and chip shop in Swindon.

Noye and Reader were tried for Fordham's murder, but both claimed it to have been self-defence. Further, it was "pitch black" and snowing. Fordham was unarmed and dressed in "SAS-style" camouflage, Gore-Tex suit and balaclava. Following the confusion when the police turned up, Reader had had it away on his toes, sneaking through private gardens and fields until he reached The Gamecock pub on the A20 where he was arrested at 7.40 PM trying to hitchhike to London. (Note: When it was eventually noticed that Reader was missing, Noye was interrogated as to his likely whereabouts. This prompted Noye's retort, "Mind your own fuckin' business".) Clarkson comments that "for a man who had just witnessed a killing connected to a notorious gold bullion robbery, he chose an extraordinary way to make good his escape—to hitch a lift". Reader accepted a lift which turned out to be two undercover detectives in an unmarked car. He tried to pretend that he had been drinking in the pub and had just left. However he was arrested for assaulting a police officer, to which he replied, "you must be joking!" He was taken to Swanley police station, where he expressed concern for Lyn, who by now was diabetic and due a pancreatic operation the following Monday. The police had found a quantity of money when they raided his house, and as a result, his wife had also been arrested and was being held at Gravesend. Under questioning, he refused to cooperate without his solicitor being present, although he also stated that "I know a police officer has been murdered, and I was told I was responsible", and although he reiterated that he knew nothing of the circumstances, he appears to have expressed sorrow for the dead man. He was charged early on the evening of 29 January.

Exercising his right against self-incrimination, Reader refused to give evidence at his trial, for which he received legal aid. Although, with Noye, he was found not guilty of Fordham's murder, he remained in custody over Brink's-Mat bullion. Tried again in May that year, this time he was jailed over a confession he had made while on police bail that he had indeed handled some of the gold. At his sentencing, where Reader received eight years, his son Brian—known as Paul—was arrested for contempt of court for shouting that his father had been "fucking stitched up", with a scuffle ensuing. Paul appeared later the same day alongside his father and Noye at their sentencing for his own for contempt of court. Reader shouted at the jury, "You have made one terrible mistake. You have got to live with that for the rest of your life." Five months after the killing, Reader was accused by Fordham's colleague on the night of kicking Fordham "as he was lying on the ground", although he did not see where the kick had landed.

Brian Reader and Noye maintained business links, and after Noye was released in 1994, Reader joined him in a timeshare scheme in Northern Cyprus. (Note: Northern Cyprus is claimed by Turkey, is not recognised as a de jure state by the UK, and as such, has no extradition treaty.) Reader's brother Colin had already invested in it and was employed full-time in the scheme. Reader's association with Noye meant that, come his final job, he was the only member of the gang to have underworld contacts. Among these were included Clerkenwell crime syndicate founder Tommy Adams, whom Reader had been spotted in Hatton Garden with, in 1985 discussing the fencing of the Brink's-Mat ingots. Reader was also close associates with Terry Perkins, with whom he worked on the last job; they had been inside together and shared work. (Note: Tommy Adams was a member of the Adams Family, a North London crime syndicate responsible for much of the city's drug trade in the 1970s and 1980s.)

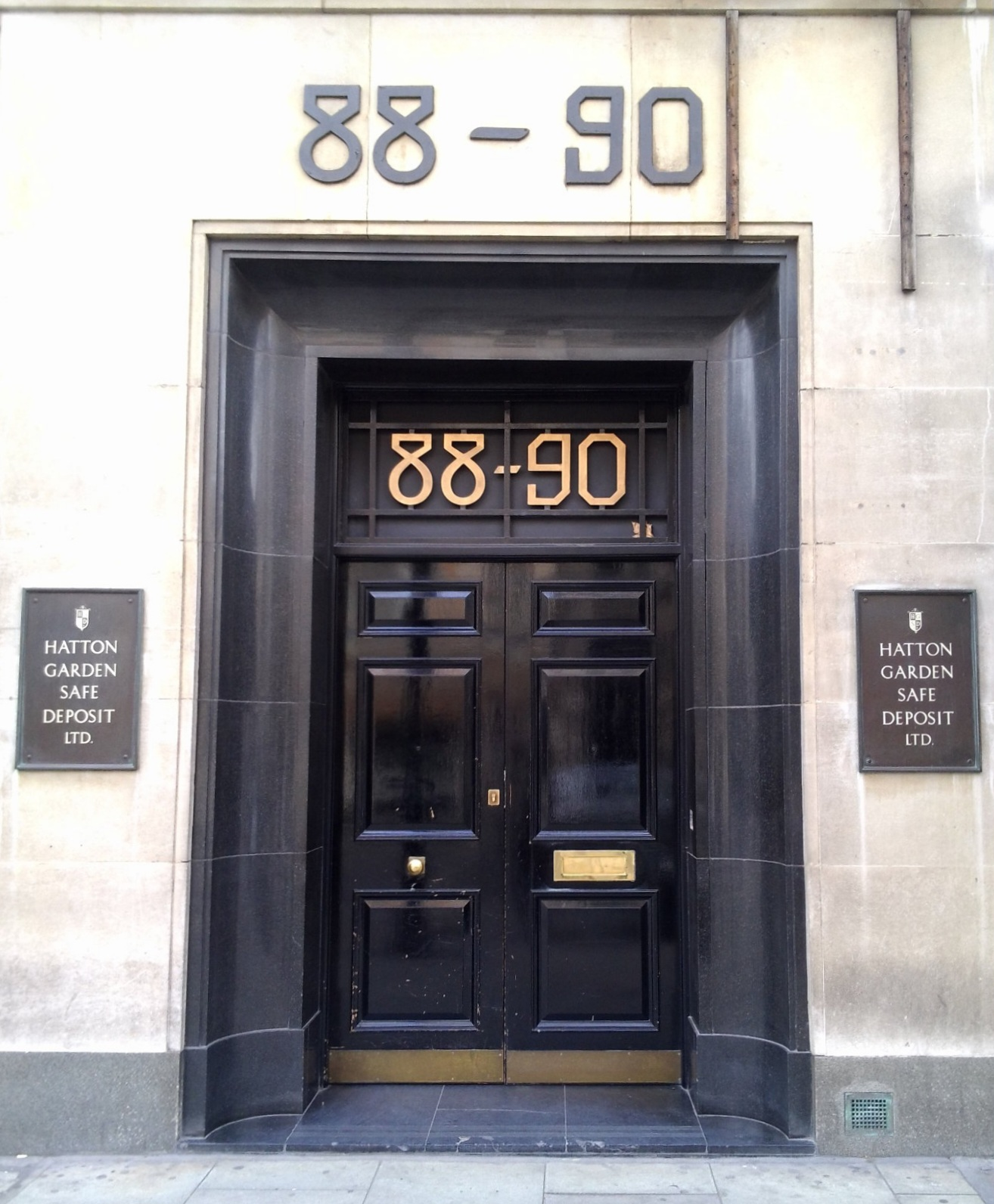
The entrance to Hatton Garden Safe Deposit Ltd at number 88–90, Hatton Garden

=== Hatton Garden ===
Following his wife's death, Reader moved to Dartford and ran a second-hand car dealership with his son. Although by now Reader had been in effective retirement from his criminal career, he was still in touch with old colleagues. He and Perkins had been discussing the heist for around a year by the time they felt sufficiently confident to bring in others. (Note: The prosecution argued that the scheme had been three years in the planning, or at least "a considerable time".) Hatton Garden had long been on Reader's mental list of potential targets.

At 76, Reader was the oldest of the conspirators, who later became known as the "Diamond Wheezers" on account of their ages. (Note: Duncan Campbell, writing in The Guardian, listed the gang's several soubriquets as "Dad’s Army. The Diamond Wheezers. The Old Blaggers. Or, as they are in the French press, “le gang du papys” (the grandads’ gang).") He made numerous trips to Hatton Garden in the weeks before the robbery, and is known to have brought the as-yet-undiscovered, mononymous "Basil" into the gang. (Note: "Basil"—a moniker bestowed by the gang—was later arrested and identified as Michael Seed, a burglar alarm specialist from Islington. North London, although this took another four years. At the time of the gang's capture, it was known that there was a missing individual, but he remained anonymous.) On 2 April 2015, travelling on "somebody else's" Freedom Pass, he took a 96 bus to Dartford, where he caught a train to Waterloo East. Reader arrived around 18:30 hours. Each gang member made their way separately to 88–90 Hatton Garden. They managed to drill through the thick concrete foundations but had to stop work when they found their passage blocked by cabinets bolted to the other side of the wall. By the end of the night—the burglary took place over a bank holiday weekend—relations between several members of the gang and Reader were at breaking point, with serious consideration being given to evicting Reader from the scheme that night. In the event he pulled out of the job, and did not turn up on the night of the 3rd. Further problems arose when it became clear that Reader intended to collect his agreed cut regardless of the degree to which he had participated.

By the time of his arrest for the Hatton Garden robbery, he was said to have earned "millions" from his trade and "had a reputation as one of the country's most audacious burglars". He was arrested on 19 May 2015, with a diamond grader and the scarf he had worn on the night both being found in his house. He had failed to dispose of his mobile phone, although it is uncertain whether this was his or his son Paul's. As a result, Paul was also arrested, and not freed until November. Police also found a book detailing the life and career of a diamond trader and industry magazines. In March of the following year, he pleaded guilty to a charge of conspiracy at Woolwich Crown Court. He was sentenced to six years and three months in prison. He was unable to attend the gang's sentencing hearing following a stroke; his counsel suggested that Reader may have had a life expectancy of only a few months by this time. The journalist Paul Moreton has described Reader as being "now deaf, half blind and at death's door, according to his lawyer". In 2018, under the Proceeds of Crime Act 2002, he and three Hatton Garden associates were ordered to pay back £27.5 million between them. Sentenced by video link in March 2016, Reader served it in Belmarsh Prison, where on one occasion he collapsed and was left without care for two days by authorities, The Independent newspaper reported. While undergoing treatment at the Queen Elizabeth Hospital, Woolwich, Reader was guarded by a nine-man-strong squad of police officers, six of whom were armed. He was released in March 2019.

== Marriage, personality and death ==
He was a thief forty years ago. They never took no chances, had it all their own way. Like all them thieves then. All that fucking business, all his partners, and all that, they weren't worth a wank. He's done nothing, the cunt, you would think he would shut up, Tel.

— Daniel Jones, one of Reader's heist colleagues, reflecting critically on his and Reader's relationship to Levi, c. 2017.

Reader met his future wife, Lyn Kidd, in 1963; Campbell describes her as "a smart and witty character". She was a bookmaker's assistant and four years younger than him. Pettifor and Somerlad argue that while she was impressed by his smart suits and ready money, it ”[took] her a little while to discover that his earnings did not come from the car dealership he claimed to run". They remained married until her death in 2009. For her part, suggest Pettifor and Sommerlad, "Lyn played the role of the master criminal's wife to perfection—always loyal and discreet". Lyn later told Campbell of her repeated encounters with the press. On one occasion, she complained that she had been reported as saying "I'll wait for you darling!" on one of Reader's convictions; she told Campbell that Reader would most probably have "jumped out of the dock and punched me on the nose" had she said anything of the sort. Another time she turned down a tabloid's offer of £1,000 just for a photograph of him drinking champagne.

Describing Reader as a young man, a relative said he was "a dodgy geezer, a good talker who knew lots of people and was always doing deals". However, he avoided the nightclubs and the highlife often of the underworld. The author Jonathan Levi has described Reader as having "short white hair, full lips [and] still tough looking though also increasingly physically frail" in his later years. Duncan Campbell called him "an easy-going character, the antithesis of the criminal wide boy ... he loves skiing and sailing".

Levi says that Reader, who was known as "The Master", "Diamond geezer" and "The Guv'nor", possesses natural leadership qualities "with a commanding presence and decisive attitude". At the peak of his career, Reader was "one of southeast London's "most notorious burglars". Journalist Paul Peachey has suggested that "the septuagenarian revelled in his reputation as a feared and dangerous armed robber". A police officer who encountered Reader said he was "a good, old-style villain [who] had a job to do and knew I did too". Levi states Reader to be both methodical and, when required, menacing, although he suggests that colleagues have occasionally accused Reader of walking off a job in a huff. A member of the 1971 Baker Street gang cited Reader's bringing in of Mills as an example of Reader's poor judge of character. Perkins also later expressed "particular ire" for Reader, arguing that while "he was a proper thief 40 years ago", by now he was an "old ponce" who spent his time "talking about all our yesterdays. He bottled it at the last minute. He's supposed to be a full-on face." This—combined with Reader's perceived high-handedness and possible incompetence—resulted in tensions developing between Reader and several other members of the gang, to such a degree that they contributed to the unravelling of their plans. Reader also suffered multiple strokes and had recently recovered from prostate cancer.

Following his release, he retired to southeast London under the name McCarthy. In April 2024, a London radio station, LBC, reported that Reader had died in September the previous year, at the age of 84, the result of cancer. LBC stated that "Reader's family are thought to have tried to keep his death a secret". However, the station also claimed that his death certificate—originally obtained by The Sun, and which described Reader as a retired gardener—established the factuality of the September date. The Telegraph declared that Reader had made over £200 million in his career, while it was reported by The Times that he had returned only 6% of his Hatton Garden profits at his death.

== Portrayals ==
Three films and a miniseries have portrayed Reader in the context of the Hatton Garden heist. Levi has argued that the main attraction to journalists and writers of Reader's gang is their generally elderly age and the "old school" nature of the job. As such, Reader has been portrayed several times in film and television. In 2016's Hatton Garden: The Heist, directed by Terry Lee Coker, he was played by Sidney Livingstone. Two years later, he was played by—in Levi's view a "slightly miscast"—Larry Lamb in Ronnie Thompson's The Hatton Garden Job, and in James Marsh's ensemble the same year—King of Thieves—Michael Caine played Reader as a "rheumy-eyed ... lifelong crook first done for nicking tinned peaches 60 years previously". Caine had expressed earlier enthusiasm, saying he would "do it in an instant". 2019 saw Reader played by Kenneth Cranham in ITV's four part TV series, Hatton Garden ("a perfect foil to Timothy Spall's Perkins and the way they wind each other up is believable"). In May the same year he was portrayed by James Nelson-Joyce in The Gold, a British TV series about the Brinks Mat investigation.
