= Roger Hammond =

Roger Hammond is the name of:

- Roger Hammond (actor) (1936–2012), English actor
- Roger Hammond (cyclist) (born 1974), English bicycle racer
- Roger Hammond (Jericho character), fictional character from American television series, Jericho
