= The Hatton Garden Job =

- UK DVD Cover
- Directed by: Ronnie Thompson
- Screenplay by: Ray Bogdanovich; Dean Lines
- Produced by: Ben Jacques
- Starring: Larry Lamb; Matthew Goode; Joely Richardson
- Cinematography: Arthur Mulhern
- Edited by: Emma Gaffney
- Music by: Duncan Forbes; Lol Hammond; Andrew Barnabas; Paul Arnold
- Production company: Fiction Films
- Distributed by: Signature Entertainment
- Release date: 14 April 2017
- Running time: 93 minutes
- Country: United Kingdom

The Hatton Garden Job, also known as One Last Heist, is a 2017 British crime film. The film is a dramatization of real-life events in April 2015, when the Hatton Garden Safe Deposit Company, based underground in the Hatton Garden area of central London, was burgled by four elderly men, all experienced thieves. The film was directed by Ronnie Thompson and stars Larry Lamb, Matthew Goode, and Joely Richardson.

The film had its West End of London première at the Curzon, Shaftesbury Avenue, on 11 April 2017.

== Outline ==
Larry Lamb plays the 76-year-old Brian Reader, taking the lead among the four "codgers" who carry out the operation, with the title of Guvnor, while the other three at the sharp end of the raid are Danny Jones (Phil Daniels), Terry Perkins (David Calder), and Kenny Collins (Clive Russell). Apart from more routine thievery going back at least to his first conviction in 1975, Reader had previously laundered the proceeds of the Brink's-Mat robbery of 1983. The burglars enter the underground premises over an Easter bank holiday weekend through a lift shaft, then drill through the thick walls of the vault with an industrial power drill, proceeding over the following two days to rifle through dozens of deposit boxes. The burglar alarm goes off, but the police decide not to attend. The robbery remains undetected until staff return to work the following week, and newspapers are soon calling it the biggest theft in English history, as the total stolen has a reported value of up to £200 million — although the gang of seven (who have a combined age of 448) don't believe it.

Matthew Goode plays the organiser of the robbery, known only as XXX, while Joely Richardson is Erzebet Zslondos, a glamorous Hungarian mobster who is pulling the strings, complete with an exotic accent and remarkable set of costumes. A subplot centres on Zslondos and a corrupt ex-policeman, DCI Frank Baskin (Mark Harris).

After an efficiently carried-out operation, the haul is divvied up, the Flying Squad of the Metropolitan Police ("the Sweeney") is called in, led by DCI Emma Carter (Sarah-Jane Crawford), and the insurers offer rewards for leads to crack the crime. Six weeks later, acting on information received, nine men are arrested, including Reader. Later, four other men are pulled in and charged with conspiracy to commit burglary. They then face the challenge of what (if anything) to say under questioning and the dilemma of whether to reveal the hiding places of the missing loot. Almost a year after they hit Hatton Garden, all but one of the men are found guilty and go to prison, Reader getting six years. Most do not take up the offer of shorter sentences for returning millions still unrecovered.

The leader, referred to in the film as "XXX", escapes justice — which at the time of shooting matched the story of the real-life Michael Seed (known as 'Basil'). Seed was later found guilty of both burglary and conspiracy to burgle, and was sentenced to ten years in prison for the former and eight years for the latter, the two running concurrently.

== Cast ==
- Matthew Goode as "XXX"
- Larry Lamb as Brian Reader
- Joely Richardson as Erzebet Zslondos
- Stephen Moyer as Marcus Ford
- Warren Brown as Trotter
- Clive Russell as Kenny Collins
- Phil Daniels as Danny Jones
- David Calder as Terry Perkins
- Jack Doolan as Judas-Jack
- Sarah-Jane Crawford as Detective Chief Inspector Emma Carter
- Tony Fadil as Police Officer
- John Alford as Prison Guard
- Craig Russell as Prison Officer
- Mark Harris as DCI Frank Baskin
- Sam Adewunmi as Isaac
- John Bagenal as Carl Doyle
- Duncan Casey as David
- David Garlick as Paul Reader
- David Goodman as Zoltan
- Connor Heath as Freddie
- James Helder as Kelvin

== Production ==
It was announced in June 2016 that Larry Lamb, Matthew Goode, Joely Richardson, and Phil Daniels had taken leading roles in the low budget film.

== Reception ==
On review aggregation website Rotten Tomatoes, the film holds an approval rating of 18% based on reviews from 17 critics, with an average rating of 3.90/10.

In negative reviews The Guardian called the film "a piece of geezer nostalgia" with a "wocka-wocka retro-funk score", but suggested that Phil Daniels might deserve an award for uttering the line “the biggest bling blag in history”. It also took the view that the film failed to keep faith with its grey power ethos by parachuting in an attractive young leader for the much older gang (Matthew Goode), who was simply an invention.

The Daily Telegraph deemed the film a Guy Ritchie pastiche and commented that "This is entirely, even aggressively un-cinematic, and after a while begins to feel like a bizarre, Brechtian joke at the audience’s expense: vast expanses of the film are, quite literally, just boring." Metro's review found the production slow and clichéd and suggested that "this is a film that ultimately proves to be every bit as opportunistic as the raid that initially inspired it."

The film magazine Empire was more positive,

The film is not without charm, thanks to engaging lead performances from a roster of solid British talent, from Larry Lamb to Phil Daniels, who can do lovable-rogue banter in their sleep. Early scenes of them plotting the heist are enjoyable if not exactly fresh, several exchanges raising a smile. Despite their best efforts, however, the film falters thanks to an inescapable fact... it’s all a little dull.

== See also ==
- Hatton Garden: the Heist – an earlier film released in 2016 based on the robbery
- King of Thieves – a 2018 film also based on the same events
- Heist film
