= The Red-Headed League (Sherlock Holmes) =

- Sherlock Holmes episode
- Episode no.: Series 1 Episode 12
- Directed by: John Bruce
- Written by: John Hawkesworth
- Based on: "The Red-Headed League" by Arthur Conan Doyle
- Original air date: 22 September 1985
- Running time: 50 minutes

"The Red-Headed League" is the 12th episode of the series The Adventures of Sherlock Holmes, the first series in the Sherlock Holmes series which is based on Sir Arthur Conan Doyle stories. The series was produced by the British television company Granada Television between 1984 and 1994 and star Jeremy Brett as the famous detective. "The Red-Headed League" is based on the short story of the same title. The episode was first aired at 9:00 PM in the United Kingdom on Sunday, 22 September 1985 on ITV. It is the fifth of six episodes in the series' second season and the twelfth of the show overall.

The episode notably takes some creative liberty in adapting the source material, refashioning it into a prelude to the series' adaptation of "The Final Problem" and introducing the character Professor Moriarty.

== Plot ==
Unlike the original Conan Doyle story The Adventure of the Red-Headed League, this video adaptation begins in front of the shop of a London pawnbroker, who we eventually find is named Jabez Wilson, and who is seen briefly emerging from his establishment as a suspicious man loiters in the foreground. The man spies on an armoured wagon as it makes a delivery of heavy chests to a bank across the street. One of the guards deliberately drops an envelope, which the spy picks up and delivers to a man, shown only by wizened hands with long fingernails.

At Holmes and Dr. Watson's flat at 221B Baker Street, Jabez Wilson, revealed as a stout man with long red hair, shows them an unusual newspaper advertisement from an organisation called 'The Red-Headed League', offering good pay "for purely nominal services" to red-headed male applicants. Holmes, amused, asks Wilson to tell them more about himself.

Wilson states that his pawnshop business has been struggling. His young half-pay assistant, Vincent Spaulding, had shown him the advertisement and urged Wilson to respond, eventually pushing the reluctant Wilson past a line of red-headed men into a barren office, where he was at once accepted for the job by a fellow red-head named Duncan Ross, supposedly on the basis of Wilson's blazing red locks. Wilson's lucrative 'job' is to copy the Encyclopædia Britannica for four hours a day without leaving the building, but after many weeks of labour, he finds a card pinned to the office door that the League is “dissolved.”

Wilson discovers Duncan Ross has moved and was named 'William Morris'. Wilson goes to a forwarding address which turns out to be a factory of artificial kneecaps. At this Holmes and Watson burst out in laughter. Soothing Wilson's indignation, Holmes questions Wilson regarding Spaulding, the assistant, and the detective becomes highly interested when Wilson describes him. Holmes assures the pawnbroker the mystery of the curious 'League' should soon be resolved.

Meanwhile Ross/Morris reports to the man with the long fingernails, who we now see to be Professor Moriarty. He tells the professor that "the business of the Red-Headed League is concluded."

Holmes and Watson visit Wilson's pawnshop, where Holmes raps the sidewalk with his stick, then asks Spaulding, who is closing up, for directions while observing Spaulding’s dirty trouser knees. Holmes next studies the neighbourhood buildings including the bank nearby, concluding major criminal activity is being planned. Satisfied, Holmes and the still-puzzled Watson attend a concert by the famed Spanish violinist Sarasate, while Moriarty, in his gloomy offices, studies a map of Paris.

Later, at the Baker Street flat, Holmes welcomes Scotland Yard Inspector Athelney Jones and a grumpy bank official, Mr. Merryweather. Holmes assures Merryweather their business is urgent, and impresses Jones by saying they are in quest of a evildoer named John Clay, the Eton- and Oxford-educated grandson of a Royal Duke, considered by Holmes to be the fourth-smartest man in London, who has a long history of criminal activity. Holmes asks Watson to bring his gun.

At the bank, which holds chests containing a large amount of gold, the four stake out a darkened, echoing vault, where Holmes states that the case bears the marks of the "diabolical" Professor Moriarty. The vigil is rewarded by the sounds of digging, and an intruder emerging through the floor. Holmes and the others capture Clay/Spaulding, who, when asked about Professor Moriarty, cautions Holmes. (This is in contrast to the original story, where there is no connection between Clay/Spaulding and Professor Moriarty.) Merryweather stammers his thanks to Holmes, who replies that the bank should refund his "considerable expenses."

Clay's associate is captured in a fight with policemen in Jabez Wilson's pawnshop, damaging it. When informed of the failure of the bank robbery, Moriarty is extremely displeased.

The next day, Watson visits Wilson's pawnshop, where Wilson complains he is "ruined.” Watson hands him a heavy pouch containing 50 sovereigns, cheering Wilson. Watson gives Wilson a parting piece of advice from Sherlock Holmes: "The next time you engage an assistant, pay him the proper wage." Later, on the London streets, Holmes explains to Watson his reasoning that solved the case: under the aliases of Spaulding and Ross, the criminals had contrived the 'Red-Headed League' story to keep Wilson out of his shop while they dug in the basement, in order to break into the nearby bank vault. As Watson compliments him, we notice what Holmes and Watson do not: Professor Moriarty nearby overhearing their conversation, with a look of utter loathing and hatred for Holmes.

== Cast ==
- Jeremy Brett – Sherlock Holmes
- David Burke – Dr. Watson
- Roger Hammond – Jabez Wilson
- Tim McInnerny – John Clay
- Eric Porter – Professor Moriarty
- Richard Wilson – Duncan Ross
- John Woodnutt – Mr. Merryweather
- Bruce Dukov – Sarasate
- John Labanowski – Athelney Jones
- Reginald Stewart – Doorman (as Reg Stewart)
- Ian Bleasdale – Accountant
- Malcolm Weaver – Archie

== See also ==
- Sherlock Holmes (1984 TV series)
- List of Sherlock Holmes episodes
