= Renee Bradshaw =

Fictional character from Coronation Street

- Coronation Street character
- Portrayed by: Madge Hindle
- Duration: 1976–1980
- First appearance: 10 May 1976
- Last appearance: 30 July 1980
- Created by: Bill Podmore
In-universe information
- Occupation: Shop owner
- Father: Harold Bradshaw
- Mother: Daisy Bradshaw
- Stepfather: Joe Hibbert
- Brothers: Terry Bradshaw
- Husband: Alf Roberts (1978–1980)
- Uncles: George Marsden

Renee Bradshaw (also Roberts) is a fictional character from the British ITV soap opera Coronation Street, played by Madge Hindle. The character was created by producer Bill Podmore as a new shop keeper. He wanted a mature female to create an atmosphere of gossip the show had previously boasted. While Podmore envisioned Renee as a feisty character, Hindle decided to play down the persona and make her likeable; she believed that no one would visit her shop otherwise. Renee was partnered with Alf Roberts (Bryan Mosley) and they later marry. However, Hindle and Mosley did not think the two were compatible. Renee also features in a feud over her shop and comedic stories such as a disastrous fishing trip.

Writers eventually decided that the Roberts' marriage had failed, and wrote her out; Renee was killed off in a car accident. Podmore has maintained that he made the correct decision, citing Renee's exit as establishing Alf as a memorable character. Reporters from Inside Soap and the Sunday Mail have branded Renee's death as shocking. The character's wedding was popular with journalists from the Daily Record and the Independent Broadcasting Authority.

== Creation and casting ==
In early 1976, Bill Podmore replaced Susi Hush as Coronation Street's executive producer. He was unhappy with the show's Corner Shop set and decided to implement changes. Podmore thought that employees Gail Platt (Helen Worth) and Tricia Hopkins (Kathy Jones) could not create an atmosphere of gossip that the shop had once created. He believed that in order to recreate it, a new mature female should be introduced. He originally planned the character of Renee to be independent, fun and feisty – an ideal to spar with pub landlady Annie Walker (Doris Speed) over alcohol sales. Podmore told Daran Little in his book "The Coronation Street story" that "without a more mature shop staff, the nitty gritty of conversation and tittle-tattle were never going to bounce around its walls." In an interview with a Daily Mirror reporter, Podmore stated that Renee was introduced to lighten up the tone of the show's stories. He explained that "I thought it was losing entertainment value, with too much social comment."

Actress Madge Hindle did not audition for the role. She previously starred in Nearest and Dearest which Podmore directed and he contacted Hindle offering her the role. She accepted the part but had reservations over Renee's characterisation and forced change. Hindle explained to Little that "I think they wanted somebody to be strong and argumentative like Ena Sharples (Violet Carson). But you can't do that in a shop because people won't come in." Hindle had no shop work experience and was not confident with maths. She found the till prop difficult because the tray ejected and hit her in the stomach, ruining many scenes.

The character and Hindle's casting were publicised on 26 April 1976. Hindle told a Daily Mirror reporter that she had grown up in a "two-up two-down house" and could relate to her character. She described Renee as "slightly bossy, but giggly and daft – a bit like me." Hindle made her first appearance as Renee on 10 May 1976.

== Development ==
"You can't really be a tremendous character in a shop ... They married me off to Alf hoping that would work but it was constant bickering."

— Hindle on Renee (1998)

Renee's first storyline saw her feuding with Annie over obtaining a licence to sell alcohol. Renee angers Annie to the point that she takes the issue to court but Renee persuades Annie's employee, Bet Lynch (Julie Goodyear), to admit that the Rovers Return does not stock wine. The court rule in Renee's favour because she can offer wine to the local community. Renee's problems with the shop continue as she is reported for Sunday trading. Renee creates trouble when she wrongly accuses Emily Bishop (Eileen Derbyshire) of reporting her but Tricia admits that she is the culprit. The serial involved Renee in a romance with widower Alf Roberts (Bryan Mosley). The pair later marry in a registry office during the episode airing on 20 March 1978, despite being told that he was only after her money. They go on to share two years of marital life together. Renee runs the corner shop on Coronation Street and Alf decides to take an early retirement from the Post Office to help her run the shop.

In one storyline Renee accompanies Alf, Fred Gee (Fred Feast) and Mavis Wilton (Thelma Barlow) on a fishing trip. Renee falls into the river and Mavis jumps in to rescue Renee. Hindle cannot swim and was surprised to be handed a wetsuit to perform her own stunts. She complained to the director who decided to use another actor to film the scene. A six-foot male wearing a dress and a red wig posed as Renee completing the stunt. Barlow was also nervous about the river and had been drinking whisky to keep warm. Location manager Gordon McKeller was unaware and put brandy in Barlow's cups of tea. Subsequently, she kept laughing through the remainder of the location shoot.

Hindle and Mosley felt that their character's marriage did not work. The show's writers also came to the same conclusion. Hindle renewed her contract with Coronation Street in November 1979 and presumed that she would remain for another year. Two days later Podmore arranged a meeting with Hindle and informed her that Renee would be written out.

However, Alf's enjoyment of working in the Post Office resurfaces. In the lead up to Renee's exit, she agrees to move to Grange-Over-Sands to run their village Post Office for a "new start". In the book Fifty Years of Coronation Street, author Tim Randall notes that Renee and Alf had become "full of plans" in their need to "enjoy the country life to the full". To prepare for the move Renee decides to take driving lessons so they can fully experience the countryside. Alf takes the role of her driving instructor and during one lesson they decide to take a detour for lunch. On the way home Renee stalls at a set of traffic lights, so Alf exits the car to take the wheel. But as he does a truck makes a "head-on collision" with the vehicle. Hindle did not require a stunt double to film her final scenes. Artificial blood was applied to her face and arms. She told a reporter from Inside Soap that "the first shot is me going towards the windscreen and then they cut before I got there. Once they decided that was okay, they reversed the shot, broke the glass and stuck my head through it, and then I came back from the windscreen onto the seat."

Renee later dies while on an operating table due to a ruptured spleen and liver. The episode featuring Renee's death was broadcast on 30 July 1980. Paul Byrne and Steve Dennis of the Daily Record reported that Mosley was "flooded" with cards from viewers after Renee's death. Hindle told Rosemary Long from Evening Times that "I really wanted Renee to live on. I thought she was a good character, good for the Street. I was most upset at being killed off." Hindle believed only positive about Renee's death was that she would not be tempted to make occasional returns. Podmore later defended Renee's departure and said "time proved the decision was correct. Alf Roberts emerged from the shadows of a humdrum marriage."

== Storylines ==
Renee visits her brother, Terry Bradshaw (Bob Mason) and notices that the Corner Shop is for sale. She purchases the Corner Shop and opens it as "Renee Bradshaw", evicting Gail Potter (Helen Worth), Tricia Hopkins (Kathy Jones) and Elsie Howard (Pat Phoenix) from the upstairs flat. She begins a feud with Annie Walker (Doris Speed) from the Rovers Return over the acquisition of an alcohol licence. When Annie tries to blockade it in court, Renee starts a petition and wins the case. The pair later decide to become friends. Renee's fiancé Harry McClean (Richard Moore) arrives to visit and accuses her of buying the shop to trap him and ends their engagement.

She becomes close to councillor Alf Roberts and the two begin a relationship. Alf proposes to a drunken Renee who accepts, but she blames her decision on alcohol. He later proposes again and she turns him down. The third time he asks she accepts and choose a small registry office for their ceremony. Alf is injured in a lorry crash at the Rovers Return. Renee fears he may die but he wakes from his coma and returns home. Alf appears to be affected by the crash and is abusive towards Renee. When he shouts at Annie, Renee apologises for his behaviour. But Alf becomes aggressive towards Renee for interfering. She threatens to leave him unless he receives psychiatric help. Renee becomes annoyed with living on Coronation Street and strives for a better life. Renee and Alf decide to move away to the countryside. She begins to take driving lessons. When Alf gets drunk, Renee is forced to drive despite being a learner driver. The car stalls and will not start. Alf becomes annoyed and orders Renee to exchange seats, but a lorry hits the car. Renee is taken to hospital and dies in surgery. An inquest confirms her death as an accident.

== Reception ==
Eric Croston from the Independent Broadcasting Authority said that Renee and Alf's wedding had been a "long-awaited day" for all. A writer from the Sunday Mail said that scriptwriters felt that Renee and Alf's marriage was "dead in the water". They branded Renee the "kindly shopkeeper" who dies in "a grisly crash which shocked viewers". A Daily Record columnist chose the episode that Alf proposes to Renee as their "drama choice" in a "pick of the day" feature. A reporter from Inside Soap described her as Coronation Street's "much loved shopkeeper" and added that she had a shocking death. In his book "Coronation Street", Jack Tinker said that Renee's death was a "salutary lesson, perhaps, to all wives who accept driving lessons from their husbands, for it was in the middle of the inevitable row that the tragedy occurred."
