= Hatton Garden: The Heist =

Hatton Garden: the Heist
- Directed by: Terry Lee Coker
- Screenplay by: Ian Burfield; Michael McKell; Terry Lee Coker
- Produced by: Bradley Coker
- Starring: Sidney Livingstone; Michael McKell
- Music by: Ian Wherry
- Release date: 12 October 2016
- Running time: 86 minutes
- Country: United Kingdom
- Budget: £14 million

Hatton Garden: the Heist is a British action film of 2016, based on the true story of the Hatton Garden safe deposit burglary in Hatton Garden, London, in April 2015, carried out by a group of elderly career criminals.

The film stars Sidney Livingstone and Michael McKell, and is directed by Terry Lee Coker.

== Outline ==
Brian Reader (played by Sidney Livingstone), a thief in his late seventies, leads a gang of seven old men with a combined age of 448 who carry out an audacious underground raid on a safe deposit centre in Hatton Garden. First convicted of a crime in 1975, Reader had been part of the Brink's-Mat robbery gang of 1983. The others who enter the premises are Daniel Jones (James Osborne), Terry Perkins (Robert Putt), and John Collins (Sidney Kean). Basil (Michael McKell) is the mastermind of the robbery.

Shortly before the robbery begins, Reader tells his men “Let’s show the digital generation what the old school can do.”

The men get into the underground facility at an Easter holiday weekend, drill through the walls of the vault, and take two days to search the safe deposit boxes for cash and valuables. The robbery is only discovered when employees return to work the following day, and the total stolen is reported to be worth some £200 million. However, the men divide up a much smaller haul. The Flying Squad of the Metropolitan Police begins its investigation. Some weeks later, an informer gives the police a lead, and nine men including Reader are arrested and charged.

== Production ==
Reported to have cost £14 million to produce, the film was the first depicting the robbery to be released. When premiered in October 2016, it broke the existence of “Basil”, the planner of the raid, who had not then been traced and charged.

McKell commented at the film's premiere in Soho

“These old guys doing a last big crime is a bit like the Rolling Stones going on one more tour or the fighter who thinks he has one more bout in him.

A DVD was released immediately after the premiere.

== Reception ==
The Movie Scene found that the film “…lacks depth, mystery, detail and pretty much everything which is needed to bring the story to life.”

== Cast ==
- Sidney Livingstone as Reader
- Sidney Kean as Collins
- Michael McKell as Basil
- Robert Putt as Perkins
- James Osborne as Jones
- Ian Burfield as Flying Squad officer
- Lee Wakefield as Ethan
- Chris Ellis-Stanton as Doctor

== See also ==
- The Hatton Garden Job (2017 film)
- King of Thieves (2018 film)
