= Antony and Cleopatra (1974 film) =

- Written by: William Shakespeare
- Directed by: Jon Scoffield
- Starring: Richard Johnson; Janet Suzman; Patrick Stewart
- Music by: Guy Woolfenden
- Country of origin: United Kingdom
- Original language: English

Production
- Producers: Lorna Mason; Cecil Clarke
- Running time: 161 minutes

Original release
- Network: ITV
- Release: 28 July 1974

Antony and Cleopatra is a 1974 videotaped television production of William Shakespeare's 1606 play of the same name, produced by ATV (which was distributed internationally by ITC) starring Richard Johnson as Mark Antony, Janet Suzman as Cleopatra, and Patrick Stewart as Enobarbus. It was directed by Jon Scoffield and is an adaptation of Trevor Nunn's Royal Shakespeare Company (RSC) production of the play. It features then-little-known Ben Kingsley and Tim Pigott-Smith in small roles.

As of 2014, this production was the last made-for-TV Shakespeare adaptation to have its American network premiere on U.S. commercial television. Laurence Olivier's King Lear was shown in the U.S. in 1984 in syndication rather than on a single network.

== Cast ==
- Richard Johnson as Mark Antony
- Janet Suzman as Cleopatra
- Corin Redgrave as Octavius (Augustus Caesar)
- Patrick Stewart as Enobarbus
- Rosemary McHale as Charmian
- Philip Locke as Agrippa
- Mary Rutherford as Octavia
- Raymond Westwell as Lepidus
- Mavis Taylor Blake as Iras
- Darien Angadi as Alexas
- Sidney Livingstone as Mardian
- Geoffrey Hutchings as A Fig Seller
- Loftus Burton as Diomedes
- Lennard Pearce as Cleopatra's Schoolteacher
- Joseph Charles as Cleopatra's Messenger
- Tony Osoba as Cleopatra's Servant
- Douglas Anderson as Cleopatra's Eunuch
- Michael Egan as Cleopatra's Eunuch
- Paul Gaymon as Cleopatra's Eunuch
- Wendy Bailey as Servant
- Madelaine Bellamy as Servant
- Edwina Ford as Servant
- Amanda Knott as Servant
- Joe Rock as Servant
- Gito Santana as Servant
- Nicholas McArdle as King
- Derek Wright as King
- Frederick Radley as King
- Norman Caro as King
- Richard Young as King
- Constantine Gregory as Ventidius (as Constantin De Goguel)
- W. Morgan Sheppard as Scarus (as Morgan Sheppard)
- Joseph Marcell as Eros (as Joe Marcell)
- Jonathan Holt as Dercetas
- Chris Jenkinson as Silius (as Christopher Jenkinson)
- John Bott as A Soothsayer
- Robert Oates as 1st Watchman
- Arthur Whybrow as 2nd Watchman
- Michael Radcliffe as 3rd Watchman
- Geoffrey Greenhill as Soldier
- William Thomas as Soldier (as William Huw-Thomas)
- David Janes as Soldier
- Jeremy Pearce as Soldier
- Mark Sheridan as Soldier
- Derek Godfrey as Maecenas
- Ben Kingsley as Thidias
- Martin Milman as Dolabella
- Tim Pigott-Smith as Proculeius
- Keith Taylor as A Messenger
- Thomas Chesleigh as Gallus
- Desmond Stokes as Taurus
- Alan Foss as A Senator
- John Bardon as Demetrius
- Peter Godfrey as A Sentry
- Malcolm Kaye as A Guard

== Deviations from the play ==
The major character of Sextus Pompey, who figures significantly in the plot in Act II, was excised from this production.
