= The Red-Headed League =

Short story by Arthur Conan Doyle featuring Sherlock Holmes

- Short story by Arthur Conan Doyle
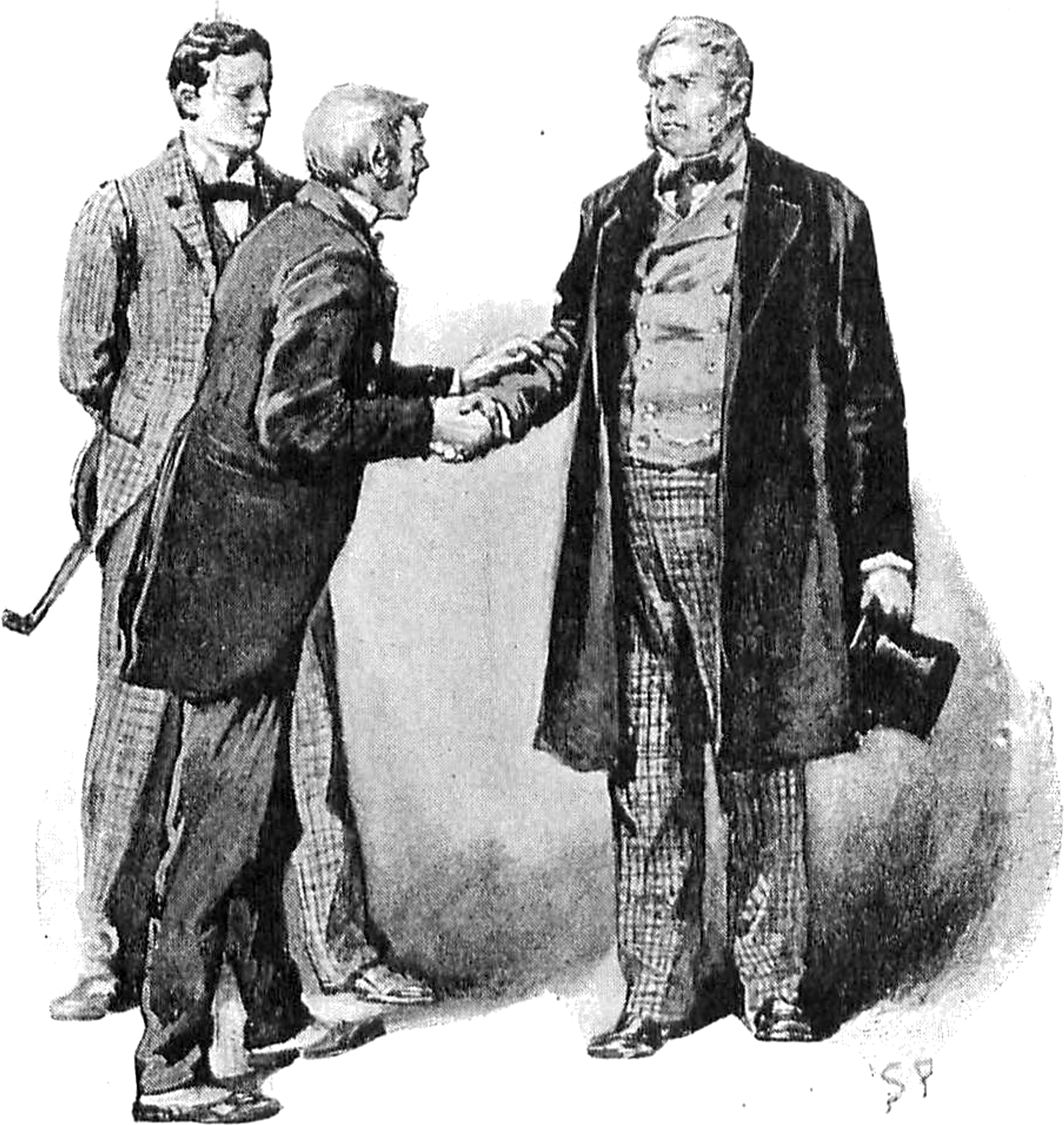
- Duncan Ross shakes Jabez Wilson's hand with Vincent Spaulding looking on, 1891 illustration by Sidney Paget

Text available at Wikisource
- Country: United Kingdom
- Language: English
- Genre: Detective fiction short stories

Publication
- Published in: Strand Magazine
- Publication date: August 1891

Chronology
- Series: The Adventures of Sherlock Holmes
A Scandal in Bohemia	A Case of Identity

"The Red-Headed League" is one of the 56 Sherlock Holmes short stories written by Sir Arthur Conan Doyle. It first appeared in The Strand Magazine in August 1891, with illustrations by Sidney Paget. Doyle ranked "The Red-Headed League" second in his list of his twelve favourite Holmes stories. It is also the second of the twelve stories in The Adventures of Sherlock Holmes, which was published in 1892.

== Plot ==
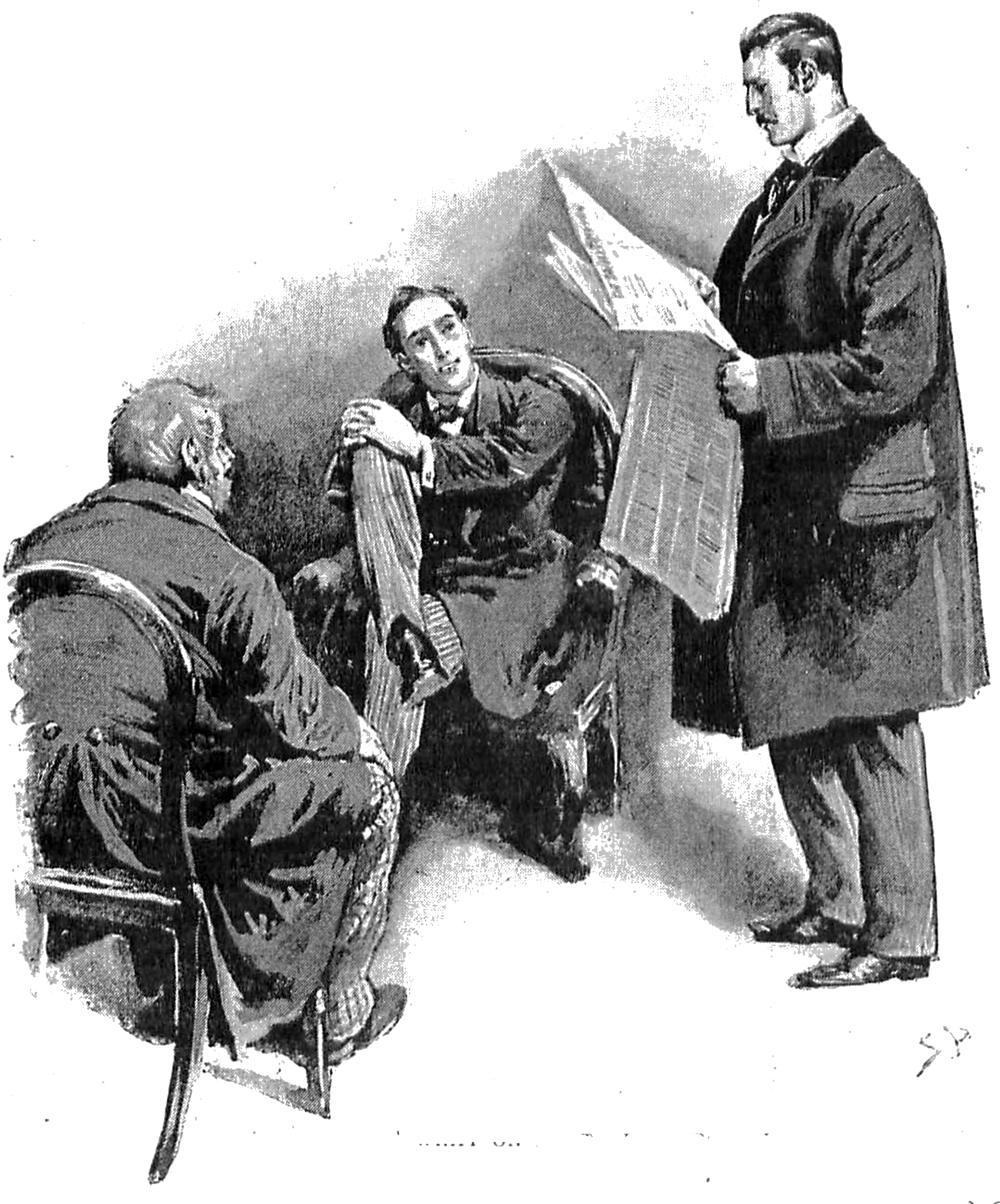
Watson reading the newspaper to Holmes and Wilson.

Jabez Wilson, a London pawnbroker, comes to consult Sherlock Holmes and Doctor Watson. While studying this prospective client, both Holmes and Watson notice his red hair.

Wilson tells them that some weeks before, his young assistant Vincent Spaulding urged him to respond to a newspaper advertisement by "The Red-Headed League" offering highly-paid work to only red-headed male applicants. The next morning, Wilson was hired to copy out the Encyclopaedia Britannica for four hours each day at the League's office, at a salary of £4 per week (equivalent to £444 in 2025). The work was useless clerical labour, performed in nominal compliance with the will of an eccentric American millionaire who wanted to provide for the welfare of red-headed men like himself. After eight weeks, Wilson reported to the office, only to find a note on the door stating that the League had been dissolved. He spoke with the landlord, who stated that he had never heard of the organisation.

Wilson provides a description of Spaulding, after which Holmes and Watson visit the pawnshop. Concluding that a crime is about to be committed at a bank near the shop, Holmes gathers Watson, Inspector Jones of Scotland Yard, and bank chairman Mr. Merryweather that night.

As the four hide in the darkened bank vault, Merryweather reveals that it holds a shipment of gold coins borrowed from a French bank; Holmes suspects a wanted criminal named John Clay of planning to steal them. After more than an hour's wait, Clay and his red-headed accomplice Archie break upward through the vault floor. Clay is immediately apprehended, while Archie flees through the tunnel but is soon caught by police stationed at the shop.

Back at Baker Street, Holmes explains his reasoning to Watson. It was obvious to him from the start that the League had been devised with the sole intention of keeping Wilson away from his pawnshop for a few hours every day. According to Wilson, Spaulding pursued photography as a hobby and spent much of his time in the cellar under the excuse of developing the pictures, which made Holmes think he might have been digging a passage to another building from there. He had recognized Spaulding as Clay from Wilson's description, and he saw during the pawnshop visit that the knees of Clay's trousers were worn and dirty, confirming his suspicions about the digging. Checking the buildings nearby, he determined that the bank was the only plausible target.

== Analysis ==
The dates given in the story do not match the characters' descriptions of time passing. The date that Wilson sees the advertisement is 27 April 1890 and he has been at work for 8 weeks and says "Just two months ago." Thus that happened by the end of June. However, the story begins by describing Holmes's meeting with Wilson as being on "one day in the autumn of last year" and the date on the door telling of the League being dissolved is that of 9 October 1890, six months after the ad was placed.

Dorothy L. Sayers analyzed this discrepancy and claims that the dates must have been 4 August and 4 October respectively.

== Publication history ==
"The Red-Headed League" was first published in the UK in The Strand Magazine in August 1891, and in the United States in the US edition of the Strand in September 1891. The story was published with ten illustrations by Sidney Paget in The Strand Magazine. It was included in the short story collection The Adventures of Sherlock Holmes, which was published in October 1892.

== Baker Street robbery ==
The story inspired the real-life 1971 Baker Street robbery in which a criminal gang tunneled from a rented shop into a bank vault. That robbery was then adapted into the 2008 film The Bank Job.

== Adaptations ==
=== Film and television ===
A 1921 short film was adapted from the story as part of the Stoll film series featuring Eille Norwood as Sherlock Holmes.

The story was adapted for a 1951 TV episode of Sherlock Holmes starring Alan Wheatley as Holmes.

The first American television adaptation of the story was in the 1954–1955 television series Sherlock Holmes starring Ronald Howard.

An adaptation of "The Red-Headed League" was used for an episode of the 1965 television series Sherlock Holmes starring Douglas Wilmer as Holmes and Nigel Stock as Watson, with Toke Townley as Jabez Wilson.

In the 1985 television adaptation starring Jeremy Brett, the scheme was masterminded by Professor Moriarty and Clay is Moriarty's star pupil of crime (Holmes and Jones explicitly note that Clay is usually more of an impulsive criminal who would not come up with something this elaborate on his own).

An episode of the animated 1999–2001 television series Sherlock Holmes in the 22nd Century titled "The Red-Headed League" was based on the story.

In the NHK puppetry television series Sherlock Holmes, Jabez Wilson is a pupil of Beeton School as well as Holmes and Watson and is invited to the Red-Headed Club by his senior Duncan Ross. But strangely enough, what he does in the club is painting balls, stones and bottles red. Holmes suspects that it is a means for Ross to ensure Wilson stays away from a certain place.

=== Audio ===
Edith Meiser adapted the story as the third episode of the radio series The Adventures of Sherlock Holmes, which aired on 5 January 1931, starring Clive Brook as Sherlock Holmes and Leigh Lovell as Dr. Watson. Other episodes adapted from the story aired on 24 May 1933 (with Richard Gordon as Holmes and Lovell as Watson) and 8 February 1936 (with Gordon as Holmes and Harry West as Watson).

Edith Meiser also adapted the story for the radio series The New Adventures of Sherlock Holmes with Basil Rathbone as Holmes and Nigel Bruce as Watson. The episode aired on 27 October 1940. Other episodes adapted from the story aired on 28 May 1943, and on 2 June 1947 (with Tom Conway as Holmes and Bruce as Watson). The story was also read by Basil Rathbone in a 1966 recording released by Caedmon Records.

A radio adaptation starring Carleton Hobbs as Holmes and Norman Shelley as Watson aired on the BBC Home Service in 1953, as part of the 1952–1969 radio series. Hobbs and Shelley also played Holmes and Watson respectively in a 1957 radio adaptation on the BBC Home Service, and a 1964 radio adaptation on the BBC Light Programme.

John Gielgud played Holmes and Ralph Richardson played Watson in a radio adaptation of "The Red-Headed League" which aired on 19 October 1954 on the BBC Light Programme. The production also aired in January 1955 on NBC radio and in May 1956 on ABC radio.

A radio adaptation aired on 26 April 1977, on the series CBS Radio Mystery Theater. Kevin McCarthy was the voice of Holmes.

An adaptation aired on BBC radio in June 1978, starring Barry Foster as Holmes and David Buck as Watson. It was adapted by Michael Bakewell.

"The Red-Headed League" was dramatised for BBC Radio 4 in 1990 by Vincent McInerney as an episode of the 1989–1998 radio series, starring Clive Merrison as Holmes and Michael Williams as Watson. It also featured James Wilby as Vincent Spaulding.

A 2014 episode of the radio series The Classic Adventures of Sherlock Holmes was adapted from the story, and starred John Patrick Lowrie as Holmes and Lawrence Albert as Watson.

In 2024, the podcast Sherlock & Co. adapted the story in a three-episode adventure, starring Harry Attwell as Holmes, Paul Waggott as Watson and Marta da Silva as Mariana "Mrs. Hudson" Ametxazurra.

- In 2025, Paul Waggott from Sherlock & Co. podcast reprised his role as John Watson redoing the story in its original text from 1892's The Adventures of Sherlock Holmes as an Audiobook, from Watson's first person perspective.

=== Stage ===
The story, along with "The Disappearance of Lady Frances Carfax", "The Adventure of the Empty House", and "The Adventure of Charles Augustus Milverton", provided the source material for the play The Return of Sherlock Holmes.

=== Video games ===
Multiple references to the story are made in the two The Great Ace Attorney games. In the first game, The Great Ace Attorney: Adventures, Herlock Sholmes (who is Doyle's Sherlock Holmes in the original Japanese version, with his name changed for legal reasons as part of localization) incorrectly deduces that one of the involved parties in the final case was trying to dig a tunnel into a bank from a pawnshop, which is quickly disproven by protagonist Ryunosuke Naruhodo. In the second game, The Great Ace Attorney 2: Resolve, Sholmes is fooled by a fraudulent advertisement from the "Red-Headed League" and drinks a potion that turns his hair red before being scammed out of five shillings. Sholmes later has the two leaders of the "league" arrested, and their testimony about the scam proves important in revealing the truth of the international conspiracy at the heart of the game's plot. In addition, the name John Clay is briefly mentioned in another case, though as the name of a policeman rather than a criminal, and a character is named Duncan Ross, although he is seemingly unrelated to the Red-Headed League.

=== Books ===
It was adapted into one of the books of the Hong Kong children's book series The Great Detective Sherlock Holmes, as "The Great Robbery" (驚天大劫案). It is Book #8 of the original Chinese version, and book #9 of the English version.

It was adapted in THE TRIUMPHANT RETURN OF SHERLOCK HOLMES by Tomihiko Morimi 森見 登美彦 (the Japanese edition was published in 2024 by Chuokoron-Shinsha 中央公論新社) where Holmes suffered a great embarrassment when the closing of The Red-Headed League did not have the criminal intent as Holmes deducted, and this became the cause of Holmes's long-term slump/depression.

== See also ==
- Baker Street robbery
