= King of Thieves (2018 film) =

2018 British film by James Marsh

- British release poster
- Directed by: James Marsh
- Written by: Joe Penhall
- Produced by: Tim Bevan; Eric Fellner; Ali Jaafar; Michelle Wright
- Starring: Michael Caine; Jim Broadbent; Tom Courtenay; Charlie Cox; Paul Whitehouse; Michael Gambon; Ray Winstone
- Cinematography: Danny Cohen
- Edited by: Jinx Godfrey; Nick Moore
- Music by: Benjamin Wallfisch
- Production company: Working Title Films
- Distributed by: StudioCanal
- Release date: 14 September 2018
- Running time: 108 minutes
- Country: United Kingdom
- Language: English
- Box office: $11.5 million

King of Thieves is a 2018 British heist film directed by James Marsh. The film is based on the Hatton Garden safe deposit burglary of 2015, and stars Michael Caine, Tom Courtenay, Michael Gambon, Charlie Cox, Jim Broadbent, Paul Whitehouse and Ray Winstone.

== Plot ==
Brian Reader is a former thief who is now retired. At the funeral ceremony for his wife Lyn, Brian sees old friends from his days as a criminal. They briefly discuss their interest in pulling off one more heist, targeting the Hatton Garden Safe Deposit. Shortly after the funeral, Brian and the other thieves meet to plan the robbery in earnest. Nearly all of them are older men, in their 60s and 70s. The only younger man is Basil, an alarms expert who comes by a key to an exterior door of the building containing the Safe Deposit.

The thieves decide to execute their heist over the Easter holiday weekend to maximise their time for the break-in and minimise the risk of being discovered. Posing as gas repairmen, they enter the deposit building, deactivate the alarms by trial and error, and proceed to drill a hole into the wall of the vault. The jack they use to push the cabinet of safety deposit boxes away from the wall breaks, adding a wrinkle to their plan. They all leave, intending to return with a new tool the following day. However, Brian has a change of heart and decides it is too risky to go back.

Basil meets with Brian to try and convince him to go back and finish the robbery. Brian refuses, but gives Basil a note listing the safety deposit boxes that contain the most valuable diamonds. In return, Basil promises to give Brian half of his take from the robbery.

Basil and the other thieves return to the Safe Deposit with the replacement tool and successfully push the cabinet away from the vault wall, enabling two of them to climb through into the vault. They then use crow bars to break open many of the safety deposit boxes and steal their contents, which add up to more than £14 million in jewels and cash. The thieves put all of the loot into duffel bags and drive away from the scene of the crime.

They proceed to the home of one of the robbers to split up the stolen goods. As they begin to discuss the split, Basil realises that the older thieves were never planning on giving him an equal share. Fearing for his life, he takes several fistfuls of cash and quickly leaves. What the other thieves do not realise until later is that Basil had also taken the high value diamonds from the safety deposit boxes that Brian had written down for him.

Meanwhile, the police are alerted to the crime and begin a high-profile investigation. They review all CCTV footage from the area and soon discover a car parked in the area that belonged to one of the thieves. After tracing the car's number-plate to the thief's actual identity, the police are able to tap all of the gang's phones and follow their movements.

After learning of the value of the loot, Brian tries to force the group to split with him since he was the one who masterminded the robbery. As the thieves grow increasingly wary and distrustful of one another, they have a number of unguarded conversations that provide the police with evidence of their culpability.

By further spying on the gang, the police learn that the group is planning to meet in order to do a final split of the stolen goods. The police move in and arrest the gang at their meeting. Brian, who was not invited to the meeting, is arrested at his home. The only one to escape is Basil as he wore a disguise during the robbery, left shortly after the Easter weekend, and was never a former associate of the older thieves.

At the end, the old thieves are in custody and they are shown changing into suits for their court appearance. They seem unconcerned about the prospect of returning to jail and appear to have accepted Brian Reader as their unspoken leader once again.

== Filming ==
The main bulk of the scenes were filmed in central London and around Margate in Kent, including scenes at the Wig and Pen Pub, the Nayland Rock Hotel, Harbour Arm in Margate, outside the Turner Contemporary, and a scene at Margate railway station. Abbott's Cliff in Dover can also be spotted in the train scene where Brian Reader (Michael Caine) travels to Margate.

== Cast ==
- Michael Caine as Brian Reader
- Jim Broadbent as Terry Perkins
- Tom Courtenay as John Kenny Collins
- Charlie Cox as Michael "Basil" Seed
- Paul Whitehouse as Carl Wood
- Michael Gambon as Billy "The Fish" Lincoln
- Ray Winstone as Danny Jones
- Francesca Annis as Lynn Reader
- Kellie Shirley as Terri Robinson

== Soundtrack ==
A cover of "The Man" originally by The Killers was released by jazz-pop singer Jamie Cullum as the lead single from the King of Thieves soundtrack.

Benjamin Wallfisch composed the music for the film. The score was released by Milan Records.

== Critical reception ==
On review aggregation website Rotten Tomatoes, the film holds an approval rating of 33% based on 85 reviews, with an average rating of 4.9/10. The site's critical consensus reads, "King of Thieves unites an incredible cast for a heist movie brimming with potential -- most of which, sadly, evaporates long before the end credits have started to roll." Metacritic gives it a weighted average score of 48 out 100 based on 16 critics, indicating "mixed or average reviews".

The Guardian gave the film two stars, saying "We get one or two cool touches. Broadbent is interestingly cast against type as a nasty piece of work, and I liked Winstone laughing with incredulous joy as he clambers into the Aladdin's cave of the strongroom. But what a mess this is: not funny enough to be a comedy, not exciting enough to be a thriller, not interesting or convincing enough to have any documentary value."

== See also ==
- Hatton Garden: the Heist and The Hatton Garden Job - earlier films based on the same events.
