= List of Coronation Street characters introduced in 1976 =

Coronation Street is a British soap opera first broadcast on 9 December 1960. The following is a list of characters that first appeared in 1976, by order of first appearance.

== John Lane ==
John Lane
- Coronation Street character
- Portrayed by: Ian Hastings
- First appearance: 19 January 1976
- Last appearance: 21 January 1976

John Lane, played by Ian Hastings, was Gail Potter's (Helen Worth) stalker.

In January 1976, Gail began getting mysterious phone calls, although she and her then best mate Tricia Hopkins (Kathy Jones) thought they were from a secret admirer. However, Gail got a phone call with breathing on the line, making her frightened. She called in the Exchange, and she was all alone when John arrived (pretending to be from the GPO) whilst Tricia was out on a date with Philip Harper (Mark Drewery).

Gail started to find John rather creepy, and discovered that he was her stalker after she also discovered he was going to assault her when he told her to get into bed so he can wait for the anonymous phone caller. However, thanks to Emily Bishop (Eileen Derbyshire), cops came round to Gail and Tricia's flat, and Gail was soon rescued and John was arrested.

== Terry Bradshaw ==
Terry Bradshaw
- Coronation Street character
- Portrayed by: Bob Mason
- First appearance: 2 February 1976
- Last appearance: 22 December 1976
- Introduced by: Bill Podmore
In-universe information
- Father: Harold Bradshaw
- Mother: Daisy Hibbert
- Sisters: Renee Bradshaw

Terry Bradshaw, played by Bob Mason, made his first onscreen appearance on in 1976 and departed in December of that year. Terry was introduced as a new employee at Ray Langton (Neville Buswell) and Len Fairclough's (Peter Adamson) builders yard. Show writers then devised a relationship with Gail Potter (Helen Worth), but their romance ended when Gail said that she did not love him. He left in December to join the army. His sister Renee Bradshaw (Madge Hindle) was also introduced into the series.

Terry arrives on the street to take a job at the local builders yard. His sister Renee arrives to visit and notices that the Corner Shop is for sale. As the two catch up on their mother's love life, she approaches Betty Turpin (Betty Driver) to purchase the shop. Renee manages to buy the shop and Terry becomes in need of a home. She lets Terry move into the shop flat and realising that he needs independence, Renee evicts tenants Gail Platt (Helen Worth) and Tricia Hopkins (Kathy Jones) onto the street. Terry soon becomes attracted to Gail and the pair begin a relationship. But when Gail reveals that she does not love him, he decides to leave and join the army. Renee then blames Gail for her brother's departure.

== Derek Wilton ==
Derek Wilton, played by Peter Baldwin, made his first onscreen appearance on 23 February 1976 and last appeared on 7 April 1997. Derek was introduced as a love interest of Mavis Riley (Thelma Barlow). Derek spent years playing with Mavis' emotions until they finally married in 1988. They are a "comic pair" who go through an entire series of misunderstandings and setbacks. Their first attempt at marriage does not develop as they jilt on another on the day. Derek goes on to marry Angela Hawthorne (Diane Fletcher) but eventually realizes that he belongs with Mavis.

In 1997, Brian Park decided to axe the character. Derek's exit storyline was devised by Paul Marquess. Baldwin filmed his final scenes on 16 March 1997. The storyline sees Derek become stressed over work, Mavis' birthday and finally an incident with an angry motorist. The stress becomes too much for Derek and he suffers a heart attack and dies. A spokesperson from the show branded the exit as "high drama" and some of Baldwin's most dramatic material. Gavin Docherty from the Sunday Mail said that Derek was a dopey character. While a writer from the Daily Mirror similarly branded him "dozy Derek".

== Wendy Nightingale ==
Wendy Nightingale
- Coronation Street character
- Portrayed by: Susan Tebbs
- First appearance: 8 March 1976
- Last appearance: 2 June 1976
- Introduced by: Bill Podmore
In-universe information
- Spouse: Roger Nightingale

Wendy Nightingale, played by Susan Tebbs, was introduced as a love interest for Ken Barlow (William Roache). Wendy is a graduate who becomes attracted to Ken. Daran Little, wrote in his book "The Coronation Street Story", that it took only two home cooked meals for Wendy to be seduced by Ken. But Wendy is already married to Roger Nightingale (Matthew Long). She reveals that she has never been unfaithful but finds married life boring. Ken urges her to leave Roger. She moves in with Ken and Roger attacks Ken for ruining his marriage. Little said that Wendy and Ken wanted different things. Wendy was well travelled in comparison to Ken who only knew life on Coronation Street. She could not cope with the "clutter, noise, smoke, noisiness and openness of the denizens of the street". Wendy lived with Ken for five weeks and admitted that she had made a mistake. She returned to Roger who was happy to forgive her and resume their marriage. Wendy and Ken were Coronation Street's first unmarried cohabiting couple.

== Roger Nightingale ==
Roger Nightingale
- Coronation Street character
- Portrayed by: Matthew Long
- First appearance: 12 April 1976
- Last appearance: 2 June 1976
- Introduced by: Bill Podmore
In-universe information
- Spouse: Wendy Nightingale

Roger Nightingale, played by Matthew Long, first appeared onscreen in April 1976 and departed on 2 June 1976. Roger is introduced as the husband of Wendy Nightingale (Susan Tebbs) who begins an affair with Ken Barlow (William Roache). She feels that her marriage to Roger has become too boring and Ken convinces her to leave him.

When she moves in with Ken, Roger becomes angry and goes to visit the new couple. He ends up attacking Ken and knocking him unconscious. In the book "The Coronation Street Story", Daran Little wrote that Ken had expected Roger to acknowledge that his marriage was over, but he was not as cooperative as Ken had hoped. When Wendy decides that she has made a mistake, Roger is willing to forgive her. Wendy returns home to Roger and they attempt to rebuild their marriage.

== Roy Thornley ==
Roy Thornley
- Coronation Street character
- Portrayed by: Sidney Livingstone
- First appearance: 26 April 1976
- Last appearance: 1 September 1976
- Introduced by: Bill Podmore
In-universe information
- Occupation: Merchandising manager
- Spouse: Doreen Thornley (until 1976)
- Daughters: Cassie Thornley; Ellory Thornley

Roy Thornley, portrayed by Sidney Livingstone, was the "business associate" of Sylvia Matthews (Rosemary Dunham). He began a relationship with nineteen year old Gail Potter (Helen Worth), and took her virginity in the stock room. Gail's then best mate Elsie Tanner (Pat Phoenix) tried to warn her that Roy was married to another woman and had two children with her, but Gail thought that Elsie was acting jealous until she was convinced that she was having an affair with Roy; Gail, disgusted by her own actions, told Roy that they were through.

Poor Gail was cited in a messy divorce after Roy's then wife Doreen (Jane Lowe) discovered the affair and Gail was sacked from her job at Sylvia's Separates. Roy tried to make Gail look like the guilty party by having her lie to the court, which she refused to do. However, Gail was soon proven innocent as it was revealed he had an affair with Sylvia.

== Renee Bradshaw ==
Irene "Renee" Roberts (née Bradshaw), played by Madge Hindle, made her first onscreen appearance on 10 May 1976 and departed on 30 July 1980. The character began a relationship with widower Alf Roberts (Bryan Mosley). The duo married in the episode dated 20 March 1978 despite accusations that Alf was only interested in Renee's wealth. Renee was written out of Coronation Street in 1980. Hindle told Rosemary Long from Evening Times that she was upset to learn her character would be killed off. Renee is involved in a car accident and dies from a ruptured spleen and liver. The episode that aired on 30 July 1980 featured Renee's final appearance.

== Doreen Thornley ==
Doreen Thornley
- Coronation Street character
- Portrayed by: Jane Lowe
- Appears on: 1 September 1976
- Introduced by: Bill Podmore
In-universe information
- Spouse: Roy Thornley (Until 1976)
- Daughters: Cassie Thornley; Ellory Thornley

Doreen Thornley, played by Jane Lowe, was Roy Thornley's (Sidney Livingstone) wife. She went over to 11 Coronation Street to meet nineteen year old Gail Potter (Helen Worth), who unknowingly had an affair with her husband. However, it was Elsie Tanner (Pat Phoenix) who answered the door, and she also tried defending her friend. Gail then broke down at the bottom of the stairs and revealed she didn't know she was having an affair, but Doreen didn't believe her. However, Gail was excused from the divorce proceedings as there was proof she was innocent.

== Mike Baldwin ==
Michael Vernon "Mike" Baldwin, played by Johnny Briggs, made his first onscreen appearance on 11 October 1976. Johnny Briggs quit the role in 2005 and Mike departed on 7 April 2006 but made a voice cameo on 14 April 2006. Mike was introduced as a Cockney businessman with an eye for the ladies.
