= Ian Burfield =

English actor

Ian Burfield is an English actor, who has often played roles as police officers and detectives on television. He appeared in 12 episodes of The Bill and 39 episodes of EastEnders, and played the part of a Tweed Coat Fingerman in 2005 film V for Vendetta. He is also a company member of the National Theatre, and has acted in two plays which were screened in cinemas around the UK as part of the National Theatre Live scheme. From September 2018 to December 2024, Burfield was a recurring character in EastEnders as Detective Inspector/Detective Chief Inspector Peter Arthurs.

== Selected filmography ==
=== Film ===
Year	Production	Role
1990	The Krays	Whip
2000	Circus	Caspar
2005	V for Vendetta	Tweed Coat Fingerman
2009	The International	Thomas Schumer
2011	Mercenaries	Anton
2012	Acts of Godfrey	Terry
2013	The Selfish Giant	Billy Brazil
2016	Hatton Garden: the Heist	Flying Squad officer

=== Television ===
Year	Series	Role	Notes
1989–2011	Casualty	various characters	4 episodes
1990–1997	London's Burning	1st Policeman/Martin	1 episode as 1st Policeman, then Series 9 as Martin
1990–2008	The Bill	various characters	12 episodes
1992–2009	Heartbeat	various characters	3 episodes
1994–1996	The Knock	Tommy Maddern	Series 1 and 2
1997	EastEnders	DI Hamilton	3 episodes
1998	Hetty Wainthropp Investigates	Martin Kenyon	1 episode "Mind over Muscle"
2000	Hero to Zero	Jimmy Brice	
2000	Urban Gothic	Lynch	1 episode "Dead Meat"
2001–2005	Holby City	Frank Nicholls/Grant Saunders	2 episodes
2003	Red Cap	Sgt. Sam Perkins	
2003	William and Mary	Steve Patterson	1 episode
2003	Rosemary & Thyme	Dave Reynolds	1 episode: "Sweet Angelica"
2003	Waking the Dead	Stephen Lovell	2 episodes: Walking on Water
2003	Grass	Harry Taylor	
2003	Sweet Medicine	Alan Hardy	1 episodes
2004	The Last Detective	Adrian Martindale	1 episode: "Dangerous and the Lonely Hearts"
2004	Family Business	Mr Adkins	
2006	The Inspector Lynley Mysteries	DS Hansford	1 episode: "One Guilty Deed"
2006	Robin Hood	Brooker	1 episode: "Turk Flu"
2007–2008, 2010	EastEnders	DI Kelly	21 episodes
2008	Lewis	Jeffreys	1 episode: "And the Moonbeams Kiss the Sea"
2009–2010	New Tricks	DI Patrick Petfield	2 episodes
2010	Midsomer Murders	Derek Soper	1 episode: "The Made-to-Measure Murders"
2010	My Family	Terry	1 episode: "Slammertime"
2010	Merlin	Nollar	1 episode: "The Sorcerer's Shadow"
2010–2012	Him & Her	Mike	3 episodes
2011	Coronation Street	Drayman	3 episodes
2012	Public Enemies	DCI Andy Parkham	2 episodes
2012	Live at the Electric	Judo Instructor	1 episode, uncredited
2012	The Secret of Crickley Hall	DI Michael	1 episode
2013	Way to Go	George	1 episode: "The Be All & End All"
2016	Doctors	Colin Cropper	1 episode
2018	Lovesick	Stallholder	1 episode
2018, 2020–2022, 2024	EastEnders	DCI Peter Arthurs	29 episodes
2019	Doctors	Nick Chapman	1 episode
2023-2024	Big Boys	Laurie Rooke	
2023	Doctors	Ray Farrell	1 episode
2026	Coronation Street	Ross Wilkes	

=== Theatre ===
Year	Venue	Production	Role
1987–1988	Belgrade Theatre, Coventry	The Crucible	Herrick
1991	National Theatre	Napoli milionaria	Peppe
2000–2001	Bristol Old Vic	A Streetcar Named Desire	Mitch
2004–2005	Playhouse Theatre	Journey's End	Trotter
2008	National Theatre	Major Barbara	Bill Walker
2011	National Theatre	The Kitchen	Max
2012	National Theatre	The Comedy of Errors	Solnius
2013	Theatre Royal Haymarket	One Man, Two Guvnors	Charlie
2014	Royal and Derngate, Northampton	Dealer's Choice	Ash
