= Roger Hammond (actor) =

English actor (1936–2012)

- Born: John Roger Hammond; 21 March 1936; Stockport, Cheshire, England
- Died: 8 November 2012 (aged 76); Ealing, London, England
- Occupation: Actor
- Spouse: Helen Weir (m. 1968; div. 1975)
- Children: 1

John Roger Hammond (21 March 1936 – 8 November 2012) was an English actor who appeared in many films and television series.

== Early life ==
Hammond was born in Stockport, and his father was a chartered accountant and managing director of a cotton mill. He attended Stockport Grammar School for two years followed by Bryanston School in Dorset. He then went to Emmanuel College, Cambridge, where he initially read English, then switched to archaeology and anthropology and he appeared extensively in their drama programme, alongside actors such as Ian McKellen and Derek Jacobi. Following that, he attended the Royal Academy of Dramatic Art.

== Career ==
In 1963, Hammond joined the Arts Theatre Company, and appeared in a number of productions there, including productions of the associated Unicorn Theatre.

In 1964, Hammond made his first television appearance, as Tidiman in an episode of The Villains, and his first film appearance the next year. Although he worked primarily as a television actor in his early years, from the 1990s his career was more focused on film, with 125 credits in a variety of roles, ranging from all sorts of genres, although mostly in costume dramas and period pieces. Hammond's credits include the Prince of Wales in The Duchess of Duke Street, Valence in A Dangerous Man: Lawrence After Arabia, and Cecil in A Good Woman. Hammond was also cast as a clergyman several times, including as the Archbishop in Ian McKellen's Richard III, the Bishop de Cambrai in The Princes in the Tower, and as the Chief Augur in the HBO television drama Rome.

In 1984 he appeared as agoraphobic bookmaker Albert Wendle in the Minder episode Get Daley!.

Hammond additionally contributed to some audio books on tape, appearing in Rosencrantz and Guildenstern Are Dead, Henry IV, Parts 1 and 2, and The Tempest.

== Death ==
Hammond died aged 76 of cancer, leaving, by his former wife, Helen (née Weir; married 1968, divorced 1975), a son, Daniel.

== Film and television credits ==
- Bachelor of Hearts (1958) .... Undergraduate pushing the car (uncredited)
- Game for Three Losers (1965) .... Peter Fletcher (Edgar Wallace Mysteries)
- The Avengers (1967, TV series) - "Return of the Cybernauts" - Prof Russell
- Lock Up Your Daughters (1969) .... Johnsonian Figure
- A Touch of Love (1969) .... Mike
- Catweazle (1970, TV Series) .... Boris
- Play for Today (1971, Episode: "Edna, the Inebriate Woman") .... Victor, Helper at 'Jesus Saves'
- The Pied Piper (1972) .... Burger
- Sutherland's Law (1972, TV Movie) .... Sheriff
- Adult Fun (1972) .... Mr. Bryant
- Because of the Cats (1973) .... Maris
- Royal Flash (1975) .... Master
- When the Boat Comes In (1976, Episode: "A Land Fit for Heroes and Idiots") .... Maj. Reginald Leslie Pinner
- Hadleigh (1976, Episode: "Broke") .... Brunswick
- The Duchess of Duke Street (1976, TV Series) .... Prince of Wales
- Queen Kong (1976) .... Woolf
- The Hunchback of Notre Dame (1976 TV film) .... Lecomu
- Edward and Mrs. Simpson (1978, TV Mini-Series) .... Sir Harold Nicolson
- The Good Soldier (1981, TV film) .... Grand Duke
- An Englishman Abroad (1983, TV film) .... Shoe shop assistant
- The Adventures of Sherlock Holmes (1984, Episode: "The Red-Headed League") .... Jabez Wilson
- Amy (1984, TV film) .... Sir Sefton Brancker
- Minder (1984, Episode: "Get Daley!") .... Albert Wendell
- Morons from Outer Space (1985) .... Soundman
- Nemesis (Miss Marple (TV series)) (1986) ....Broadribb, solicitor
- Foreign Body (1986) .... Pub landlord
- Farrington of the F.O. (1986-1987, TV Series) .... Josef / Jose Gonzales
- Little Dorrit (1987) .... Mr. Meagles
- Madame Sousatzka (1988) .... Lefranc
- The Fool (1990) .... Augustus Roddick
- Screen Two (1990, Episode: "Fellow Traveller") .... Tudor Hamilton
- Performance (1991, Episode: "Uncle Vanya") .... Waffles
- Edward II (1991) .... Bishop
- A Dangerous Man: Lawrence after Arabia (1992, TV Movie) .... Valence
- Orlando (1992) .... Swift
- As You Like It (1992) .... Mr. Lebeau
- The Madness of King George (1994) .... Baker
- Richard III (1995) .... Archbishop
- Screen Two (1995, Episode: "Persuasion") .... Mr. Musgrove
- The Ghostbusters of East Finchley (1995) .... Mr. Gleeson
- The Ruth Rendell Mysteries (1996) .... Dr. Trewynne
- The Secret Agent (1996) .... Mr. Michaelis
- Sixth Happiness (1997) .... Father Ferre
- Solomon (1997) .... Zadok
- Monk Dawson (1998) .... Fr Julian
- The Tichborne Claimant (1998) .... Cubitt
- Drop The Dead Donkey (1998, TV Series) .... Sir Roysten Merchant
- The Clandestine Marriage (1999) .... Traverse
- A Christmas Carol (1999, TV Movie) .... Second Broker
- The Strange Case of Delfina Potocka: The Mystery of Chopin (1999) .... Schwabe
- Arabian Nights (2000) .... Jerome Gribben
- Up at the Villa (2000) .... Colin Mackenzie
- Shrink (2000, Short) .... Claus
- Bedazzled (2000) .... Play Actor
- Victoria & Albert (2001, TV Movie) .... Duke of Coburg
- Redemption Road (2001) .... Old Man
- Possession (2002) .... Professor Spear
- Vacuums (2002) .... DJ Johnson
- Around the World in 80 Days (2004) .... Lord Rhodes
- A Good Woman (2004) .... Cecil
- Rome (2005, TV Series) .... Chief Augur
- Princes in the Tower (2005, TV Movie) .... Bishop de Cambrai
- Keeping Mum (2006) .... Judge
- Van Wilder 2: The Rise of Taj (2007) .... Camford Dean
- Quest for a Heart (2007) .... Elder (English version, voice)
- The King's Speech (2010) .... Dr. Blandine Bentham (final film role)

== Partial stage credits ==
- Camino Real ... Baron de Charlus
- A Month in the Country ... Arkady Srgeitch Islaev
- Deutsches Haus ... Griben
- Love's Labours ... Charles
- Three Sisters ... Andrey
- Caesar and Cleopatra ... Pothinus
- Arsenic and Old Lace ... Dr. Einstein
- Luther ... Eck
- I, John Brown ... Jack McGrew
- Salad Days ... Timothy's Father / Butterfly Catcher
- The Corn is Green ... The Squire
- The Public Eye ... Charles Sidley
- Serjeant Musgrave's Dance ... The Mayor
- All in Good Time ... Leslie Piper
- Lady Windermere's Fan ... Dumby
- The Importance of Being Earnest ... Rev. Dr. Chasuble
- The Madness of King George ... Baker
- 'Tis Pity She's a Whore ... Donado
- The Seagull ... Shamraev
- Donkeys' Years ... Tate
- Poor Bitos ... Mirabeau
- The Cherry Orchard ... Pishchik

== Other projects, contributions ==
- When Love Speaks (2002, EMI Classics) – Shakespeare's "Sonnet 119" ("What potions have I drunk of siren tears")
- Fable 2 Chieftain of Knothole Island – Lionhead Studios
- The Screwtape Letters (2009, Focus on the Family Radio Theatre) - Toadpipe
