= Sidney Livingstone =

English character actor

Sidney Frederick Livingstone (born 29 March 1945) is an English stage, television, and film character actor. He has sometimes been credited as Sydney Livingstone.

== Early life ==
Born in Rochdale, Lancashire, Livingstone was an apprentice chef, a salesman, and a plumber's merchant, before gaining a place at the Guildhall School of Music and Drama and training as an actor. He graduated in 1969.

== Career ==
Livingstone's acting career began on stage, and by 1973 he was working with the Royal Shakespeare Company. He appeared in several productions directed by Trevor Nunn, including Richard II, Hamlet, Timon of Athens and The Blue Angel. An early film role came in The Ragman's Daughter (1972).

In 1974, he played Mardian in the television film Antony and Cleopatra. His many other television credits include Jeeves and Wooster in which he played the role of Constable Oats, Crown Court, Shine on Harvey Moon, Minder, and Boon. In 2016, he starred as Brian Reader in the British film Hatton Garden: the Heist.

== Theatre ==
- Coriolanus (Royal Shakespeare Company, Aldwych Theatre, 1973) as Officer
- Hindle Wakes as Sir Timothy Farrar
- Inherit the Wind (The Old Vic, directed Trevor Nunn) as Bannister
- A Chorus of Disapproval (1985) as Jarvis
- Richard II (Old Vic Theatre, directed Trevor Nunn) as Bishop of Carlisle
- Hamlet (Old Vic Theatre, directed Trevor Nunn) as Voltimand
- Timon of Athens (Young Vic, directed Trevor Nunn) as Lucullus
- Sitting Pretty as Max
- Oklahoma! (Royal National Theatre) as Andrew Carnes
- Arcadia (Royal National Theatre, 1993) as Richard Noakes
- Measure for Measure (Royal Shakespeare Company) as Provost
- The Blue Angel (Royal Shakespeare Company, directed Trevor Nunn) as Bombler
- Acorn Antiques: The Musical! (Theatre Royal Haymarket, 2005) as Ken
- Crazy for You (West End, 2011) as Everett Baker

== Films ==
- The Ragman's Daughter (1972) as Borstal Instructor
- Antony and Cleopatra (1974) as Mardian
- The Body in the Library (1984) as Brogan
- Lifeforce (1985) as Ned Price
- Passion Killers (1999) as Fred
- Oklahoma! (1999) as Andrew Carnes
- Hatton Garden: The Heist (2016) as Brian Reader

== Television ==
- Coronation Street (1976) as Roy Thornley
- Happy Since I Met You (television play, 1981) as Dennis
- Miss Marple: The Body in the Library (1984) as Brogan
- The Crucifer of Blood (1991) as Roly Lamas Dir
- Jeeves and Wooster: Trouble at Totleigh Towers and The Ties that Bind (1993) as Constable Oates
- Midsomer Murders: Days of Misrule (2008) as Don Mitchinson
- The Devil's Hour (2022) as Gerald Bell
