= Duncan Campbell (journalist, born 1944) =

British journalist and author (1944–2025)

- Born: Iain Duncan Campbell; 15 December 1944; Edinburgh, Scotland
- Died: 16 May 2025 (aged 80); London, England
- Education: Edinburgh Academy; Glenalmond College; University of Edinburgh
- Occupations: Journalist and author
- Spouse: Julie Christie (m. 2005)

Duncan Campbell (15 December 1944 – 16 May 2025) was a Scottish journalist and author who worked particularly on crime issues. He was a senior reporter and correspondent for The Guardian from 1987 until 2010, and wrote several books.

== Background ==
Iain Duncan Campbell was born on 15 December 1944 in Edinburgh, Scotland. His father Ian was a lawyer in the family firm of Archibald, Campbell and Harley, and his mother Jean (née Sanderson), who was educated at Edinburgh University, later became a voluntary worker.

Campbell was educated at the Edinburgh Academy and at Glenalmond College, Perth and Kinross, Scotland. (Glenalmond Register 1950–1985). From 1963 to 1966, he studied law at Edinburgh University, where he edited The Student newspaper. He said in a 2022 interview with Erwin James: "The first series I started doing in the magazine was on aspects of crime. I'm talking 1964, we still had the death penalty, so I did a feature on hanging – one on abortion, which was illegal, then one on homosexuality, which also was illegal. I was curious about crime. I'm a little embarrassed to say I grew up reading Agatha Christie and True Crime magazines. I suppose it was stuff from the other side of the tracks which was so interesting and fascinating. These features brought me into contact with both sides of the law. What was interesting was hearing both sides of the story and trying not to assume or make assumptions."

After graduating from university, Campbell went to South Africa, where he was a teacher in Pietermaritzburg, and he was deeply affected by the first-hand experience of apartheid that he gained through travelling around the country. Campbell also worked for a while in Puerto Rico as an advertising copywriter, before returning to the UK, in the late 1960s, and becoming part of a commune in west London.

Campbell was married to Academy Award-winning actress Julie Christie, whom he met in 1978 at Dingwalls club in Camden Town, north London; they lived together from 1979 onwards, and married in 2005. In January 2008, several news outlets reported that the couple had just had a "secret marriage" in India, which Christie dismissed as "nonsense", saying: "I have been married for a few years. Don't believe what you read in the papers."

Campbell died from lymphoma on 16 May 2025, at the age of 80. He is buried on the eastern side of Highgate Cemetery.

== Journalist ==
Campbell was a copywriter for advertising agency Ogilvy & Mather before he quit in 1971, aged 26, to visit India, and pursue an ambition to become a journalist. Decades later, he turned the experience of the trip into his first novel, The Paradise Trail.

Campbell worked for the London Daily News and City Limits (both defunct), Time Out and LBC Radio, prior to joining The Guardian in 1987, becoming the paper's crime correspondent and going on to serve as its Los Angeles correspondent for five years. He also worked on BBC Radio 5 Live's Crime Desk programme.

In June 2009, it was announced by The Guardian that Campbell would take voluntary redundancy and he worked as a freelance writer, including for The Guardian.

Campbell was a chair of the Crime Reporters' Association, for four years in the 1990s, and winner of the Bar Council Legal Reporting Award for Newspaper Journalist of the Year in 1992.

== Author ==
=== Fiction ===
Campbell was the author of two novels, the first of which, The Paradise Trail, was published in 2008. Set largely in India in 1971, it is partly a murder mystery and partly an affectionate depiction of life on the "hippie trail": the cheap hotels and eating places, the music, the drug-fuelled conversations. According to the reviewer for the Socialist Review: "One impressive aspect of this book is the almost seamless blending of quite mundane events such as cricket matches with serious issues like imperialism, British and Indian politics, and death. Campbell makes important points through his characters without rendering them ridiculous – no mean feat considering the main characters are permanently stoned hippies and a frustrated hotelier. One of the reviews on the back of the book described it as 'a great beach read', but I'd go further than that – it's a great read whether you're on a beach or not." According to The Independent: "Duncan Campbell skilfully traces how the paradise trail upon which these naive hopefuls stumble leads painfully back to the very selves they had hoped to flee."

Campbell's second novel was If It Bleeds (2009), described in the Camden New Journal as "an entertaining and fast-moving comedy about the real and unreal shared world of literary criminals, downtrodden journalists and police desperate to be seen to be doing a good job", while another reviewer summed it up by saying: "What you've got here is a cracking good yarn, told with verve and humour. Can we have a follow-up?"

=== Non-fiction ===
Campbell wrote several nonfiction books, including a history of British crime from the 1930s to the 1990s (The Underworld, 1994; based on the BBC television series) and That Was Business, This Is Personal (1990; a series of interviews with criminals and those who pursue them). A Stranger and Afraid (1997) covers the story of Caroline Beale.

Campbell's 2016 book We'll All Be Murdered In Our Beds draws on his many years as a crime correspondent. The Evening Standard wrote about it: "A strong sense of nostalgia runs throughout this zany catalogue of atrocity and achievement", while The Guardian reviewer called the book "by turns amusing, engaging, horrifying and, yes, thoughtful. It is not merely a catalogue of the goriest and most notorious crimes, but a fascinating description of the often corrupt relationship between Fleet Street's finest and the police."

Campbell's 2019 book, The Underworld: The inside story of Britain’s professional and organised crime, was a Sunday Times Bestseller.

== Bibliography ==
=== Books ===
- Billy Connolly: The Authorized Version (Pan Books, 1976) - biography of Billy Connolly, ISBN 978-0-330-24767-2
- That Was Business, This Is Personal: The Changing Face of Professional Crime (Secker & Warburg, 1990), ISBN 978-0-436-19990-5
- The Underworld (BBC Books, 1994), ISBN 978-0-563-36793-2; revised edition (Penguin Books, 1996) ISBN 978-0-14-025744-1
- A Stranger and Afraid: The story of Caroline Beale (Macmillan, 1997), ISBN 978-0-333-69146-5
- The Paradise Trail (The Headline Review, 2008), ISBN 978-0-7553-4245-7, paperback ISBN 978-0-7553-4247-1
- If It Bleeds (Headline Publishing Group, 2009), ISBN 978-1-84782-874-3, ISBN 978-0-7553-4248-8
- We'll All Be Murdered In Our Beds: The Shocking History of Crime Reporting in Britain (Elliott & Thompson, 2016), ISBN 978-1-78396-133-7
- The Underworld: The inside story of Britain's professional and organised crime (Ebury, National Geographic Books, Amazon, 2019) ISBN 978-1-5291-0365-6, ISBN 978-1-5291-0365-6

=== Selected articles ===
- "Don't Forget Bradley Manning", Common Dreams, 7 March 2011.
- "Classic miscarriage of justice TV shows go live", Inside Time, 1 July 2014.
- "Doing time: confessions of a crime reporter", The Guardian, 23 April 2016.
- "Lord Lucan's been found – again!", The Oldie, 29 January 2020.
- "'Labelled a Black Villain': Routine Racism and Injustice in Britain", Byline Times, 24 March 2020.
- "Julian Assange's release frees up one UK prison cell, but why has it taken so long – and what about the others?", Opinion, The Guardian, 25 June 2024.
- "Out of time: How London became a news desert", Prospect, 28 August 2024.
- "Man on the run", The Oldie, 19 September 2024.
- "'Just a dishonest window cleaner'? Britain's history of audacious cat burglars", The Guardian, 3 January 2025.
