= City bonds robbery =

1990 heist in London

Coordinates: 51°30′44″N 0°05′14″W

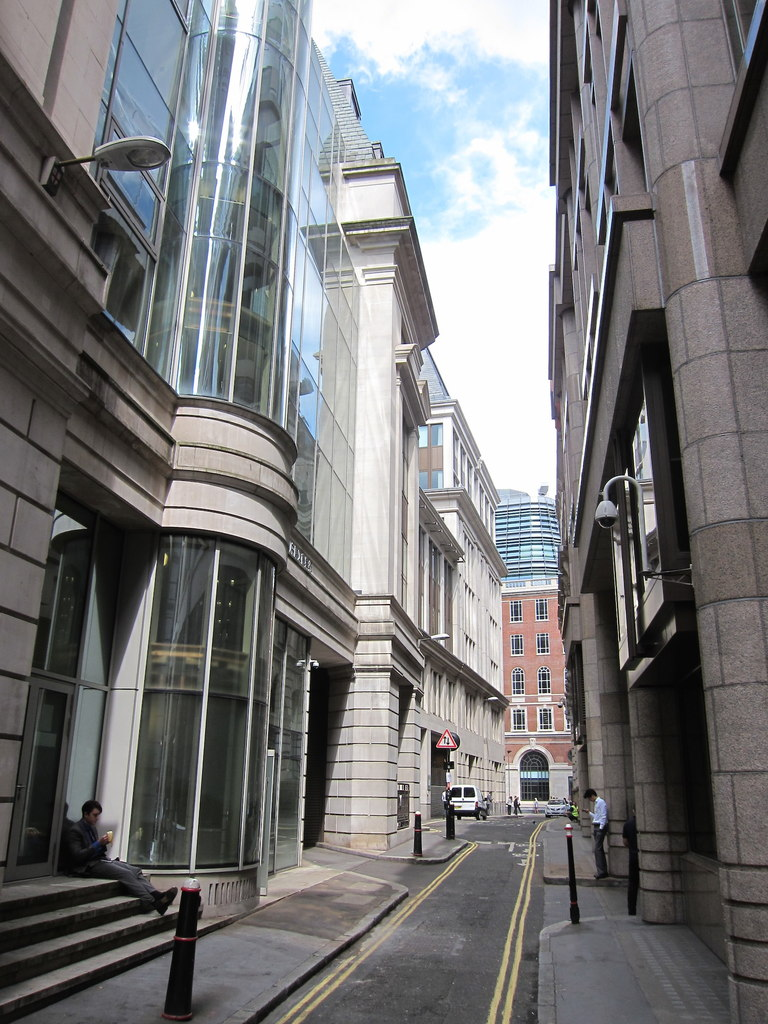
- Nicholas Lane, the alleyway in which courier Goddard was mugged of £291.9M
- Date: 2 May 1990
- Time: morning (GMT)
- Location: Nicholas Lane, City of London, UK
- Type: Money heist
- Outcome: £291.9M in bearer bonds

The City bonds robbery of 2 May 1990 was a heist in which £291.9 million (equivalent to £720M in 2025) was stolen in London, England, from a courier on his way to the Bank of England. The carefully planned operation made it seem at first as if the courier had been opportunistically mugged, yet the City of London Police soon realised that it was a sophisticated global venture which ended up involving participants such as the New York mafia, the Provisional Irish Republican Army (IRA), and Colombian drug barons. The robbery was one of the largest in world history.

The robbery took advantage of the existence of couriers who moved vast sums of money around the City of London in order to ensure liquidity in the UK financial system. The money was in the form of certificates of deposit and HM Treasury bills. These bearer bonds were recovered in different places including Glasgow, New York, Miami (on their way to Peru), and Zürich. In a wide-ranging investigation, the police eventually recovered all but two of the 301 certificates, with some of those arrested allegedly turning informant, such as Mark Osborne, who was later found murdered.

Patrick Thomas, who allegedly carried out the original theft, was shot dead. Keith Cheeseman, the fence, was arrested in the UK but skipped bail to Tenerife, claiming his life was in danger. He was briefly thought to have been The Bolney Torso, and then was located and arrested in Spain. Cheeseman was extradited to the US to stand charges of money laundering and received a six and a half year sentence. John Traynor was arrested for a mortgage fraud using the stolen bonds as collateral; he was sentenced to seven years for handling stolen goods. A year and a half later he absconded from prison; he was arrested in the Netherlands in 2010 and extradited back to the UK to serve the rest of his sentence.

== Planning ==
The idea for the robbery was generated by media reports in January 1990 that a courier had accidentally dropped £4M (equivalent to £10M in 2025) worth of bearer bonds on their way to the Bank of England. A 23-year-old surveyor had picked up the four certificates of deposit on Throgmorton Street outside the Stock Exchange, after they had fallen out of the briefcase of a courier working for Rowe & Pitman, a subsidiary of S. G. Warburg & Co. When he gave them back, he was rewarded with a magnum of Laurent-Perrier champagne.

Upon hearing this story, an organised crime syndicate realised that if a courier was mugged, they could reap a massive haul, since bearer bonds entitle whoever is carrying them to the money denoted on them. The certificates were issued every week by the Bank of England as a means to manage short term spending needs, ensuring that there was always liquidity in the financial system. The bills matured after one to six months and were freely traded, until the process became electronic in the mid-2000s. Care was taken to make the theft appear to be an opportunistic mugging, since the bonds would be cancelled if it was suspected to have been a heist ordered by an organised crime group. The syndicate planned to launder the bonds as quickly as possible in Zürich.

== Robbery ==
On the morning of 2 May 1990, 58-year-old John Goddard, an employee of financial brokers Sheppards (a subsidiary of Cater Allen) was walking along Nicholas Lane, an alleyway in the City of London. He was carrying 301 certificates worth £291.9M (equivalent to £720M in 2025) in bearer bonds in a briefcase, of which £121.9M were certificates of deposit and £170M were HM Treasury bills. Suddenly a young man in his twenties appeared and mugged Goddard at knifepoint; the robber is widely believed to have been Patrick Thomas.

At first, it seemed the operation had gone according to plan, despite The Times reporting the next day that the heist had gathered a "worthless haul" and that "the perpetrator stands to make not a penny from the crime"; the Bank of England was supplying false information to the media on purpose; whilst it had informed financial institutions worldwide of the serial numbers, the bonds could still be cashed. The Swiss connection which was supposed to launder the money did not work out; therefore, the syndicate was forced to seek other options in the criminal underworld. The New York mafia became interested, since they were already involved in a scheme to launder US bonds in London.

The contact man in the UK was Keith Cheeseman, who had previously made false loan applications to support a lavish lifestyle which included becoming chairperson of Dunstable Town FC. Back in 1975, he had been charged with extorting £287,000 and remanded for a week, after arriving at court in a silver chauffeur-driven Rolls-Royce; he later received a six-year sentence for conspiracy to defraud the Beneficial Finance and Loan Society with 318 fictitious loan applications.

Told about the heist, Cheeseman went to work, liaising with associates such as Raymond Ketteridge. He sent some of the stolen bonds to Mark Osborne in the US, who then met up with mafioso Tony Dipiono in a New York bar and delivered ten bonds, each worth £1M. However, Dipiono was an FBI agent and Osborne was arrested, subsequently deciding to betray his associates. The FBI allegedly recorded the conversations between Osborne and Cheeseman until Osborne disappeared in August 1990 and was later found murdered.

== Recovery ==
The syndicate in London came to realise that it was also infiltrated by an informer, since the City of London police swiftly began to recover the bonds. The police had initially hoped the mugging was no more than an accident and the certificates would be found discarded, yet the evidence built up that it was a sophisticated plan and thus Operation Starling was set up. Soon they had reports of a bond turning up in Northern Ireland and someone tried to deposit a bond at a Natwest bank in Glasgow.

In summer 1990, 80 certificates worth £77M were recovered during an allegedly routine check at Heathrow Airport on a flight arriving from Dublin. Three Irish men were arrested and customs stated "We did not know the bonds were coming in. We found them by pure chance". In fact, the men had been under surveillance, since one of them was Thomas Coyle, a known fence. Coyle had quickly acquired 80 of the stolen bonds and realising their enormous value had recruited John Gilligan and Jim "Danger" Beirne to help sell them. Not being able to shift them in Ireland, they devised a plan to sell them to mafia connections in the US via John Francis Conlon, who had connections to various security agencies and arms dealers such as Monzer al-Kassar and Oliver North. The plan was sabotaged at the first stage when Coyle, Anthony Rooney and Edward Dunne were all arrested at Heathrow. The bonds were discovered in Rooney's luggage and all three men maintained their innocence. When the case came to trial at Knightsbridge Crown Court, all three were released on technicalities. Coyle later bought a racehorse which he named 77 Mill.

Operation Starling retrieved £80M worth of bonds in Cyprus and other raids occurred in the Netherlands, Scotland, Singapore and West Germany. A link to the Provisional Irish Republican Army (IRA) was revealed in September 1990, when a man left a package at the Aeroperú offices in Miami to be delivered to Lima in Peru. A search by US Customs revealed that the package contained £71M in stolen bonds, which the IRA was attempting to trade with Colombian drug barons in exchange for money and narcotics. The smugglers had hidden the bonds in two Miami phonebooks.

Raymond Ketteridge was arrested with another man and charged with handling £70M in stolen bonds, only to see his prosecution dropped in London in July 1991. He later won his battle against extradition from Cyprus to the US in 1994. He had been facing charges of money laundering based on the heist. The police also foiled a mortgage scam which aimed to use stolen bonds as collateral, arresting John Traynor in 1990.

== Death of Patrick Thomas ==
Thomas lived on the Turnham Road council estate in Brockley, south London, with his step-sister and her family. He presented himself as merely being an ordinary person on the estate, whilst being involved in criminal enterprises such as drug-dealing and robbery. When he and David Summerville were caught red-handed cutting up a kilo (2 lb) of cocaine in March 1991, they were remanded to Belmarsh Prison, then he managed to convince the jury that his co-defendant was responsible for the £30,000 haul of cocaine and thus was acquitted, whilst Summerville received a seven-year sentence.

Career criminal Jimmy Tippett Junior writes in his autobiography Born Gangster that Patrick Thomas showed him the bonds in a toilet cubicle soon after robbing Goddard. Tippett was arrested in relation to the robbery and had his charges dropped before court. According to Tippett, he had been drinking with Thomas earlier in the evening of 28 December 1991, and then became separated from him when Thomas refused to be searched by a bouncer because he was carrying a gun. In the early morning of 29 December, after hearing a scuffle and a bang at the front door, Thomas' step-sister found him lying on the ground with a gunshot wound to the head. He died from his injuries as she called for an ambulance. At first, police believed that Thomas had been killed by friends of Summerville, but it soon became clear that Thomas was involved in other crimes since he had assorted building society accounts with over £150,000 in them and he was eventually connected to the bonds robbery as the suspected mugger.

== Arrest of Keith Cheeseman ==
Keith Cheeseman was arrested in the UK after an investigation by City of London police and the FBI. He was sentenced to six and a half year term but had managed to flee the country whilst on bail. The Today newspaper ran a story 26 October 1991 entitled "£290M clue to headless corpse" which stated Cheeseman had been found decapitated in Bolney, Sussex. However, The Bolney Torso was not Cheeseman, who was actually on the run in Tenerife. A man who stopped to urinate on his way home found the body in a wooded area, wrapped up in a carpet with neither head nor hands. The body was laid to rest in 1994, then dug up again in 2009 for extended forensic testing, which suggested the man was from Bavaria in Germany and had spent about a year in the UK before his murder. A German fraudster was identified as living nearby in Haywards Heath at the time, but police investigations have never linked him to the crime in any way. As of 2018 the corpse is still unidentified.

After his arrest in Spain, Cheeseman was extradited to the US, where he faced charges related to a conspiracy to launder £392M in stolen bonds, including the £292M obtained in London. Cheeseman claimed he had skipped bail in fear for his life and pled guilty, admitting he had processed £16M in bonds. Judge Robert W. Sweet sentenced him to the maximum available term of six and a half years because he had attempted to evade justice and because of his criminal past. Cheeseman had also been involved in another fraud scheme, in which he had seduced a supervisor at a financial services company. He rented her a luxury apartment and they conspired to transfer £8M into an offshore account, before the two were arrested by the City Fraud Squad.

== Arrest of John Traynor ==
John Traynor escaped a dispute with criminal associate Martin Cahill in Ireland by moving to England in the late 1980s. He then reacquainted himself with old friend James "Danger" Beirne who was involved in various fraudulent schemes. The two men joined with John Francis Conlon to set up a new venture in which they would attempt to use some of the stolen bonds as collateral investment for a mortgage from a Swiss bank. Conlon had connections to Miami and presented plans for a fictitious £100M holiday resort on a Caribbean island.

Using bonds with altered numbers, they managed to gain a £200,000 advance in Geneva, although the bank sent warnings to City of London police and the Serious Fraud Office. When the courier returned to pick up the rest of the mortgage, the bank told him to wait so he called Traynor, who was sitting on a street near Bayswater Road in London. As they spoke, police swooped in both England and Switzerland, and they were both arrested. Traynor was charged with handling stolen goods and received a seven-year sentence.

Traynor went to jail in July 1990 and quickly began planning his escape. As a reward for good behaviour he was transferred from HM Prison Wandsworth to HM Prison Highpoint in Suffolk. He then requested a temporary home leave to see his family and when that was granted in November 1992, he immediately took a flight to Dublin and escaped, secure in the knowledge that his offence would not lead to extradition from Ireland. However, Traynor was eventually arrested in the Netherlands in 2010, as part of a combined operation by British and Dutch police investigating organised crime across borders. He was then extradited back to the UK to serve the rest of his sentence.

== Legacy ==
The City bonds robbery is seen as one of the largest heists in history in terms of the amount taken, dwarfing other UK crimes such as the Brink's-Mat robbery, the Great Train Robbery, the Knightsbridge Security Deposit robbery, the Northern Bank robbery and the Securitas depot robbery. Globally, it is eclipsed by the 2003 robbery of almost £695M (equivalent to £1.3 billion in 2025) from the Central Bank of Iraq by Qusay Hussein, son of Saddam Hussein. The police ultimately recovered all but two of the 301 certificates that were stolen in the City bonds robbery. The Bank of England continues to use the bonds system to protect financial liquidity, but the last paper bills were produced in September 2003, when the entire process became electronic.

== See also ==
- List of heists in the United Kingdom
