= List of heists in the United Kingdom =

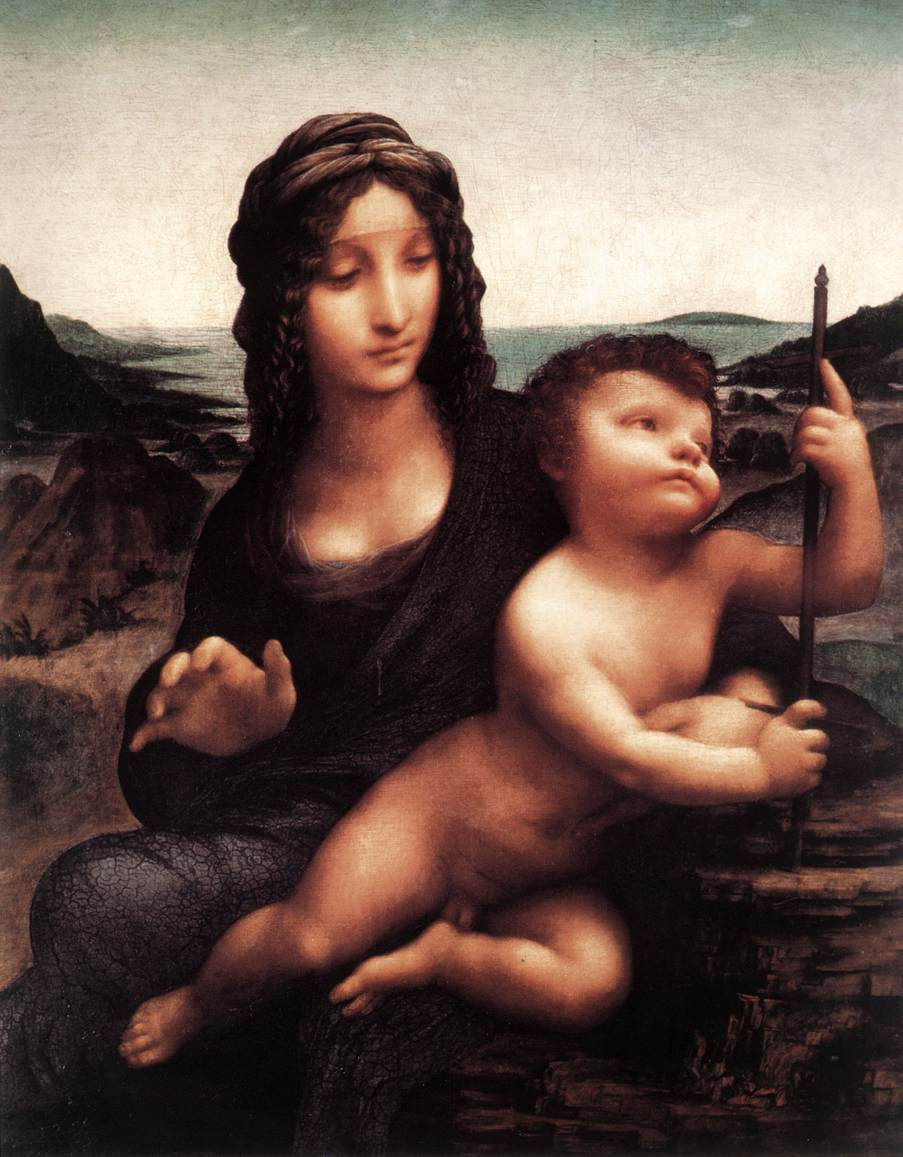
The Buccleuch Madonna, attributed to Leonardo da Vinci and another artist, was stolen from Drumlanrig Castle in 2003 and recovered in 2007.

A heist is a theft of cash or valuable objects such as artworks, jewellery or bullion. This can take the form of either a burglary or a robbery, the difference in English and Welsh law being that a robbery uses force (which means that some of the heists commonly known as robberies were actually burglaries). In order to be listed here, each heist which took place in the United Kingdom is required to have taken a total sum of £1 million or more in cash or goods at contemporary rates. The largest heist was £291.9 million (equivalent to £720 million in 2025) taken in the City bonds robbery, although Charles Darwin's notebooks (announced as having been most likely stolen in 2020) were never valued. The largest cash robbery was the Securitas depot robbery.

The heists vary in location and form. Railway trains were plundered in the Great Gold Robbery and the Great Train Robbery and in 1935 there was a robbery at the Croydon Aerodrome. Exhibition spaces such as the Ashmolean Museum, the Christ Church Picture Gallery, the Harley Gallery, the National Gallery and the Whitworth Art Gallery, and stately homes such as Blenheim Palace, Drumlanrig Castle, Ramsbury Manor and Waddesdon Manor have suffered losses. Graff jewellery shops in London have been attacked several times, alongside other shops in Bond Street and Hatton Garden. Banks, secure warehouses and vaults were targeted in the cases of the Brink's-Mat robbery, the Hatton Garden safe deposit burglary, the Knightsbridge Security Deposit robbery and the Northern Bank robbery. Regarding artworks, the Portrait of Jacob de Gheyn III by Rembrandt has been stolen a total of four times. Other paintings subject to theft include works by Cézanne, Goya and Henry Moore. The perpetrators range from individuals such as Kempton Bunton to syndicates like the Pink Panthers.

== Overview ==
The largest UK heist on record in terms of the amount stolen was the 1990 City bonds robbery, when a courier carrying 301 bearer bonds worth £291.9 million (equivalent to £720 million in 2025) was robbed on a small City of London street. All but two of the certificates were subsequently recovered, with the heist revealing the global nature of organised crime networks and directly leading to two murders.

The tunnel dug in preparation for the Baker Street robbery

The Baker Street robbery was an audacious heist in 1971 which netted the criminals an estimated £3 million (equivalent to £38 million in 2025). They tunnelled into a vault below a Lloyds Bank branch from a shop two doors down the road. It was organised by a syndicate of five people and whilst there were three arrests, only one of the ringleaders was caught. The Hatton Garden safe deposit burglary of April 2015 shared some similarities with the Baker Street robbery. Five members of the gang were quickly arrested, yet a sixth man known only as "Basil" remained free. He was caught in 2018, when the police raided his flat and found gold and jewellery worth £143,000. The same vault had been robbed of an estimated £1.5 million by a lone thief in 2003.

It later transpired that Brian Reader was the mastermind of both the Baker Street and the 2015 Hatton Garden heists. He was 76 at the time of the latter. Reader had also been involved in processing the gold bullion stolen in the Brink's-Mat robbery of 1983, for which he served eight years in prison. Terry Perkins was another member of the gang and had previously been convicted for his part in the 1983 Security Express robbery, being sentenced to 22 years. He absconded from HM Prison Spring Hill and was on the run for 17 years before being caught again following the Hatton Garden burglary. Perkins died in HM Prison Belmarsh in 2018, aged 69. Perkins and Danny Jones (also convicted for the Hatton Garden robbery) were both linked to a previous heist at the Chatila jewellers in Old Bond Street, in 2010. The network of criminals termed the Pink Panthers has been linked to several robberies of the Graff jewellery shops in London. The Johnson Gang robbed many stately homes, including Ramsbury Manor, then the home of Harry Hyams, where they plundered goods worth approximately £30 million and Waddesdon Manor, from where they took snuffboxes worth £5 million.

Another large heist was the Knightsbridge Security Deposit robbery in 1986, which took at least £40 million (equivalent to £119 million in 2025). An Italian man later received a 22-year prison sentence for planning the venture with the help of an insider. The gang which carried out the Securitas depot robbery in 2006 first impersonated police officers in order to take the manager and his family hostage, then stole £53 million (equivalent to £92 million in 2025). They were forced to leave another £153 million behind for lack of space in the getaway vehicle. Five men were later convicted for the crime and given minimum jail sentences of between ten and fifteen years. This was the UK's largest cash robbery.

Northern Ireland's biggest heist took place in 2004. During the Northern Bank robbery in Belfast, two employees and their families were taken hostage on Sunday 19 December and the following evening a van drove away with £26.5 million in assorted bank notes. Bertie Ahern (the Irish Taoiseach) and Tony Blair (the Prime Minister of the United Kingdom) jointly accused the Provisional Irish Republican Army of planning it but nobody has ever been held directly responsible. Likewise, no-one responsible for the 1952 Eastcastle Street robbery was ever apprehended, although gangster Billy Hill confessed he had organised it in his memoirs.

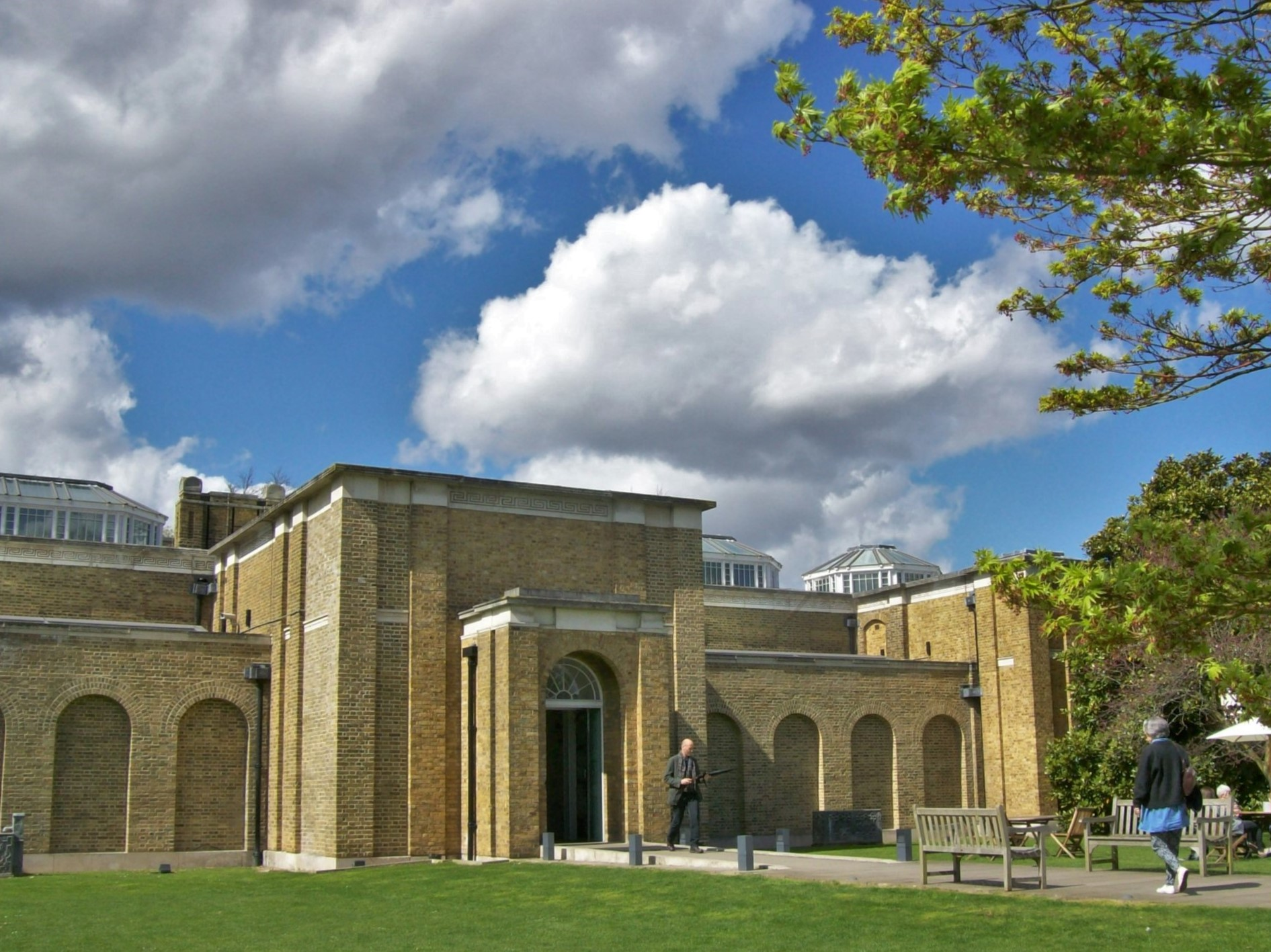
Dulwich Picture Gallery

Regarding artworks, the Portrait of Jacob de Gheyn III by Rembrandt is held by Dulwich Picture Gallery and has been stolen a total of four times. The small painting, which is 12 by 10 inches (30 by 25 cm), was first stolen from the museum in 1967 along with 13 other works; they were all found within a week. It was next taken in 1973 by a thief who jumped on a bicycle to make his getaway and was caught within minutes. In 1981, three men took the painting and it was later retrieved from a taxi. The last theft occurred in 1983, when thieves broke into the gallery using ladders; the painting was discovered three years later at a railway station in Münster, Germany.

The Portrait of the Duke of Wellington by Goya was stolen in 1961 from the National Gallery in London. Four years later, Kempton Bunton returned the painting and later gave himself up to the police, although it was revealed long after his death that it was actually his son who had taken the artwork. Other stolen artworks include Cézanne's View of Auvers-sur-Oise (not recovered) and Gainsborough's Portrait of Georgiana, Duchess of Devonshire (recovered). The artist cast of the sculpture Reclining Figure 1969–70 by Henry Moore was stolen in 2005 and it is most likely to have been sold as scrap metal. America was a golden toilet made as an artwork by Maurizio Cattelan. When it was stolen in 2019, it had been plumbed in to the water mains at Blenheim Palace, where it was being exhibited. Cattelan said the thieves were "great performers".

== Heists ==
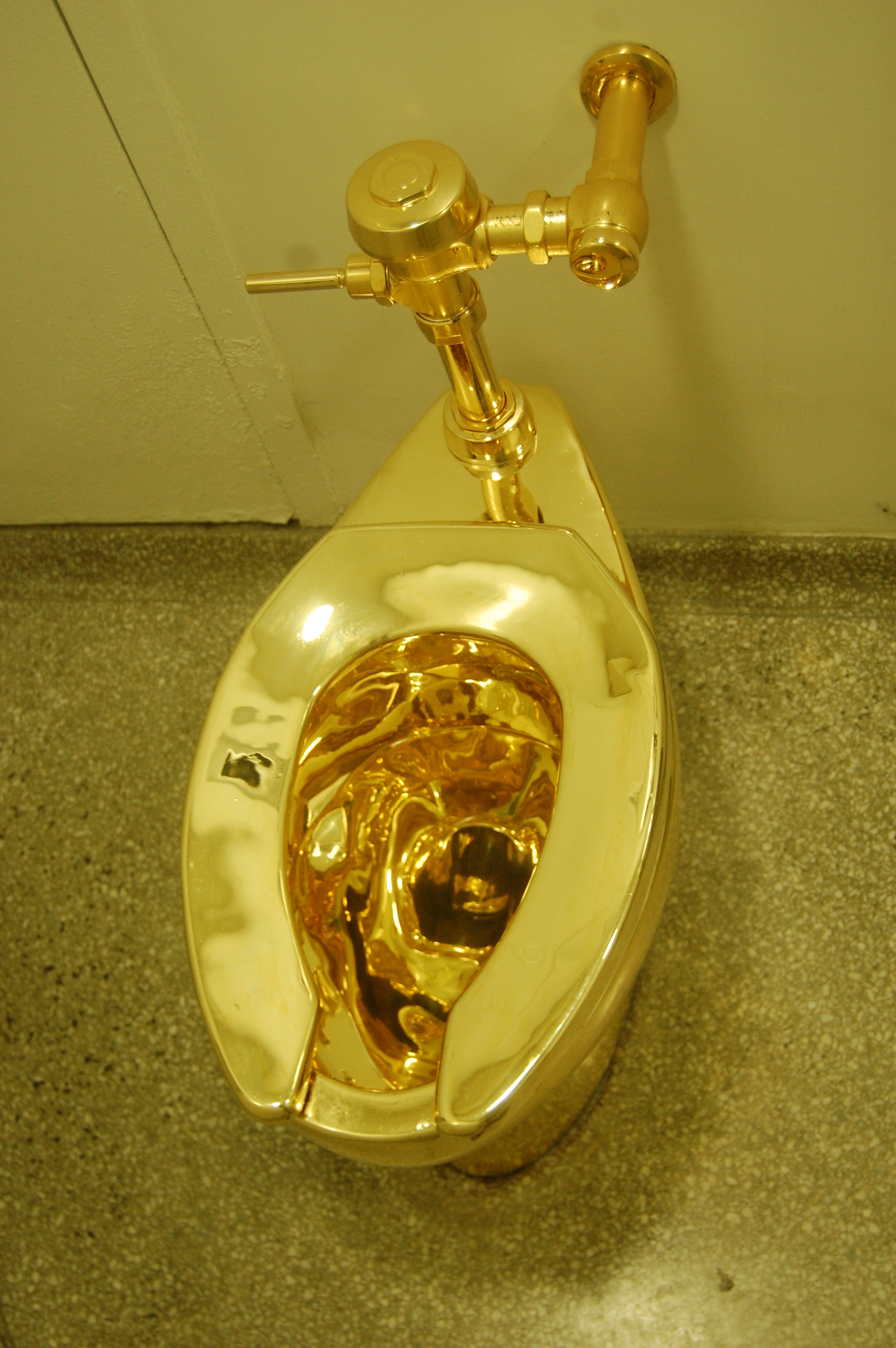
America was a golden toilet made by Maurizio Cattelan which was stolen from Blenheim Palace in 2019.

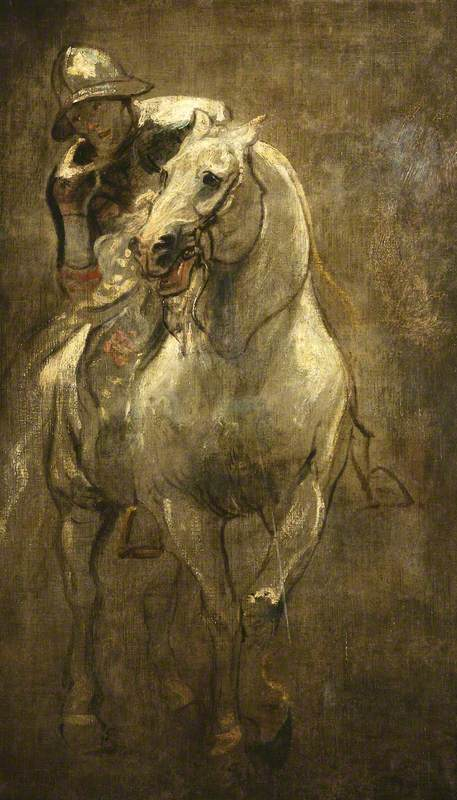
A Soldier on Horseback by Anthony van Dyck was one of three paintings stolen in 2020 from Christ Church college in Oxford.

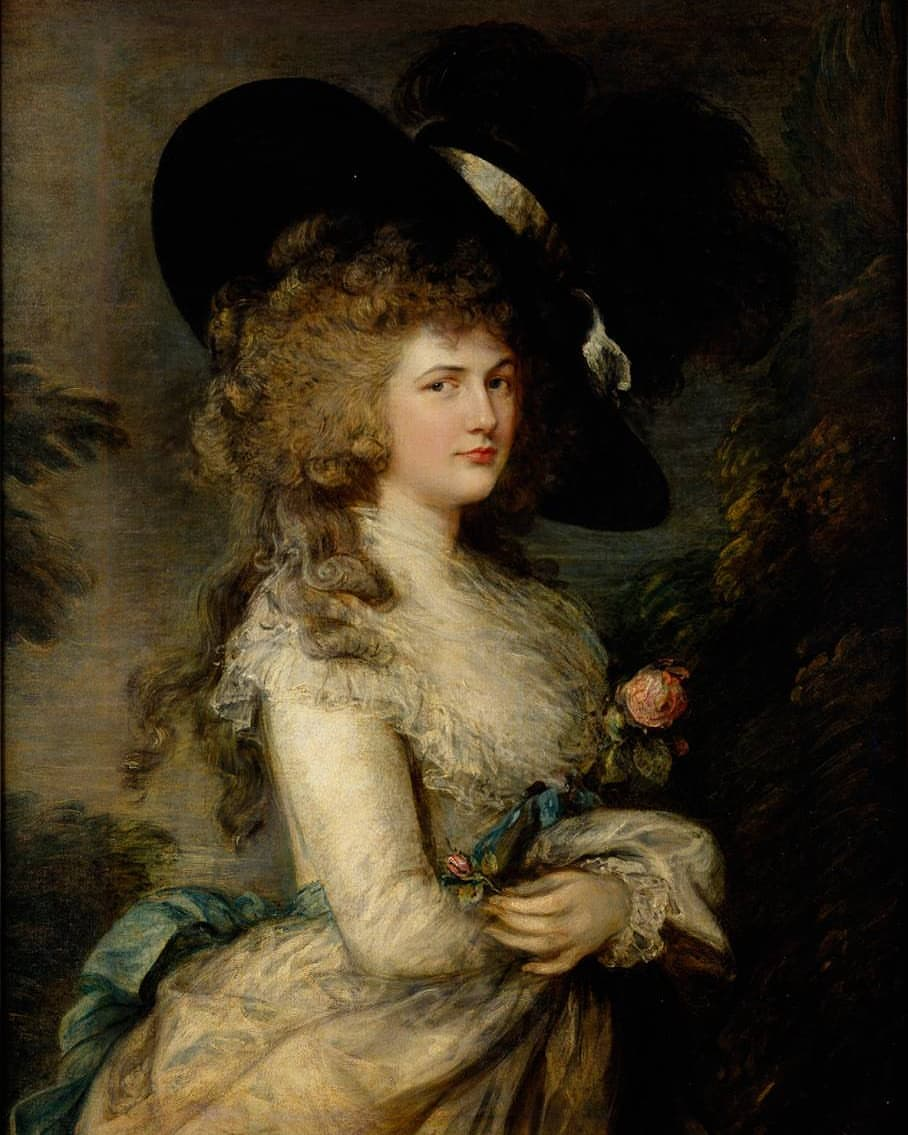
The Portrait of Georgiana, Duchess of Devonshire by Gainsborough was stolen in 1876 by Adam Worth and recovered in 1901.

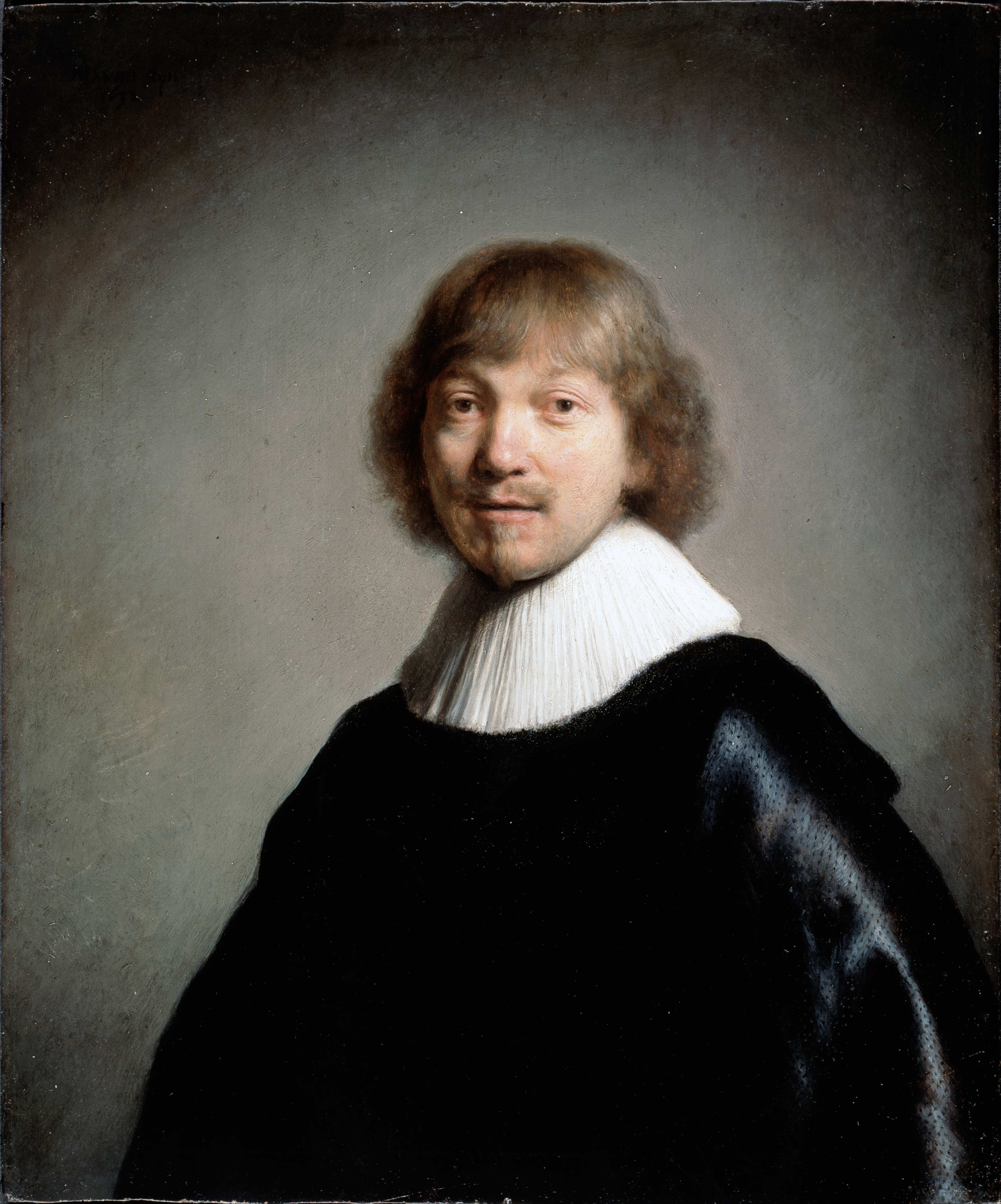
The Portrait of Jacob de Gheyn III by Rembrandt has been stolen four times.

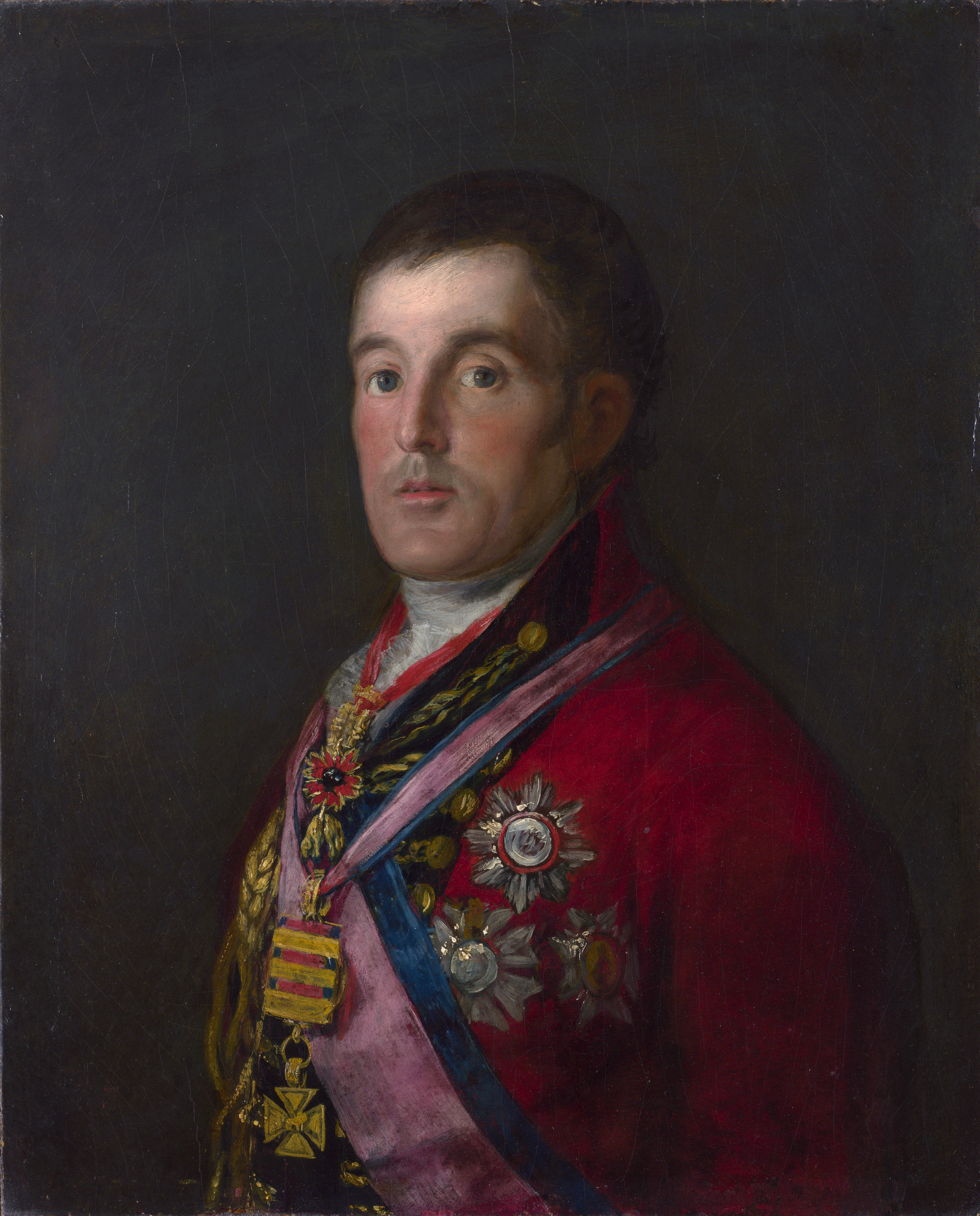
The Portrait of the Duke of Wellington by Goya, stolen in 1961 and recovered in 1965

List of heists in the United Kingdom
Year	Name	Location	Original value	Contemporary value (Note: Contemporary values for heists up to 2025 are calculated using an inflation template.)
1855	Great Gold Robbery	Between London and Folkestone	£0.012 million (£12,000)	£1.12 million
1876	Theft of the Portrait of Georgiana, Duchess of Devonshire	Thomas Agnew & Sons, Mayfair, London	£0.01 million (£10,605)	£1.06 million
1881	Hatton Garden Post Office robbery	Hatton Garden, London	£0.08 million (£80,000)	£8.4 million
1907	Theft of the Irish Crown Jewels, regalia of the Order of St Patrick and other jewels	Dublin Castle, Dublin (Note: Then in the United Kingdom of Great Britain and Ireland.)	£0.033 million (£32,550)	£3.4 million
1913	Great Pearl Robbery	Hatton Garden, London	£0.15 million (£150,000)	£15 million
1935	Croydon Aerodrome robbery	Croydon Airport, Surrey	£0.021 million (£21,000)	£1.29 million
1952	Eastcastle Street robbery	Eastcastle Street, London	£0.287 million (£287,000)	£7.19 million
1954	KLM bullion heist	Holborn, London	£0.04 million (£40,500)	£1.1 million
1961	Theft of the Portrait of the Duke of Wellington	National Gallery, London	£0.14 million (£140,000)	£2.72 million
1963	Great Train Robbery	Mentmore, Buckinghamshire	£2.6 million	£47.5 million
1967, 1973, 1981, 1983	Theft of the Portrait of Jacob de Gheyn III	Dulwich Picture Gallery, London	£6.2 million valuation in 2011	£9.2 million
1970	Barclays Bank robbery, Ilford	Ilford, London	£0.237 million (£237,000)	£3.3 million
1971	Baker Street robbery	Baker Street, London	£3 million	£37.9 million
1972	Barclays Bank robbery, Wembley	Wembley, London	£0.138 million (£138,000)	£1.6 million
1975	Bank of America robbery, Mayfair	Mayfair, London	£8 million	£62.1 million
1980	A13 bullion heist	A13, east London	£3.4 million	£14.6 million
1980	Marlborough diamond robbery	Sloane Street, London	£1.5 million	£6.4 million
1983	Brink's-Mat robbery	Heathrow International Trading Estate, Heathrow Airport, London	£26 million	£88.4 million
1983	Security Express heist	Shoreditch, London	£6 million	£20.4 million
1987	Knightsbridge Security Deposit robbery	Knightsbridge, London	£40 million	£119.5 million
1988–1992	Loughton incinerator thefts	Loughton, Essex	£0.6 million	£1.3 million
1990	City bonds robbery	Nicholas Lane, City of London	£291.9 million	£721.8 million
1993	Graff workshop robbery	Hatton Garden workshop, London	£7 million	£15.1 million
1995	Midland Bank Clearing Centre heist	Salford, Manchester	£6.6 million	£13.6 million
2000	Theft of View of Auvers-sur-Oise	Ashmolean Museum, Oxford	£3 million	£5.7 million
2000–2001	Theft of Charles Darwin's notebooks	Cambridge University Library	"£ millions"	"£ millions"
2003	Hatton Garden safe deposit theft	Hatton Garden, London	£1.5 million	£2.7 million
2003	Graff robbery 2003	New Bond Street, London	£23 million	£42.1 million
2003	Theft of Buccleuch Madonna	Drumlanrig Castle, Dumfries and Galloway, Scotland	£25 million	£45.7 million
2003	Waddesdon Manor heist	Aylesbury, Buckinghamshire	£5 million	£9.1 million
2003	Whitworth Art Gallery heist	Manchester	£4 million	£7.3 million
2004	Gallaher Group cigarette robbery	Belfast	£2 million	£3.6 million
2004	Northern Bank robbery	Belfast	£26.5 million	£47.8 million
2005	Graff robbery 2005	Sloane Street, London	£2 million	£3.5 million
2005	Theft of Reclining Figure 1969–70	Perry Green, Hertfordshire	£3 million	£5.3 million
2006	Ramsbury Manor heist	Ramsbury, Wiltshire	£30 million	£51.8 million
2006	Securitas depot robbery	Tonbridge, Kent	£53 million	£91.6 million
2007	Graff robbery 2007	Sloane Street, London	£10 million	£16.9 million
2009	Graff Diamonds robbery	New Bond Street, London	£40 million	£63.8 million
2010	Chatila heist	Old Bond Street, London	£1 million	£1.5 million
2012	Durham University Oriental Museum burglary	Durham	£2 million	£2.9 million
2012	Fitzwilliam Museum burglary	Trumpington Street, Cambridge	£57 million	£82 million
2015	Hatton Garden safe deposit burglary	Hatton Garden, London	£14 million	£19.3 million
2017	Feltham book heist	Feltham, London	£2.5 million	£3.3 million
2018	Theft of the Portland Tiara	Harley Gallery, Nottinghamshire	£3.75 million	£4.9 million
2019	Theft of America	Blenheim Palace, Woodstock, Oxfordshire	£4.6 million	£5.9 million
2019	Le Vian diamond robbery	Staines-upon-Thames, Surrey	£4.1 million	£5.3 million
2019	Tamara Ecclestone jewellery burglary	Kensington, London	£26 million	£33 million
2020	Christ Church Picture Gallery heist	Christ Church, Oxford	£10 million	£12.7 million
2023	Slough cash depot heist	Slough, Berkshire	£5 million	£5.2 million
2024	Avenue Road burglary	Avenue Road, London	£10.4 million	£10.7 million

== See also ==
- List of major crimes in the United Kingdom
