= Portrait of Jacob de Gheyn III =

1632 painting by Rembrandt

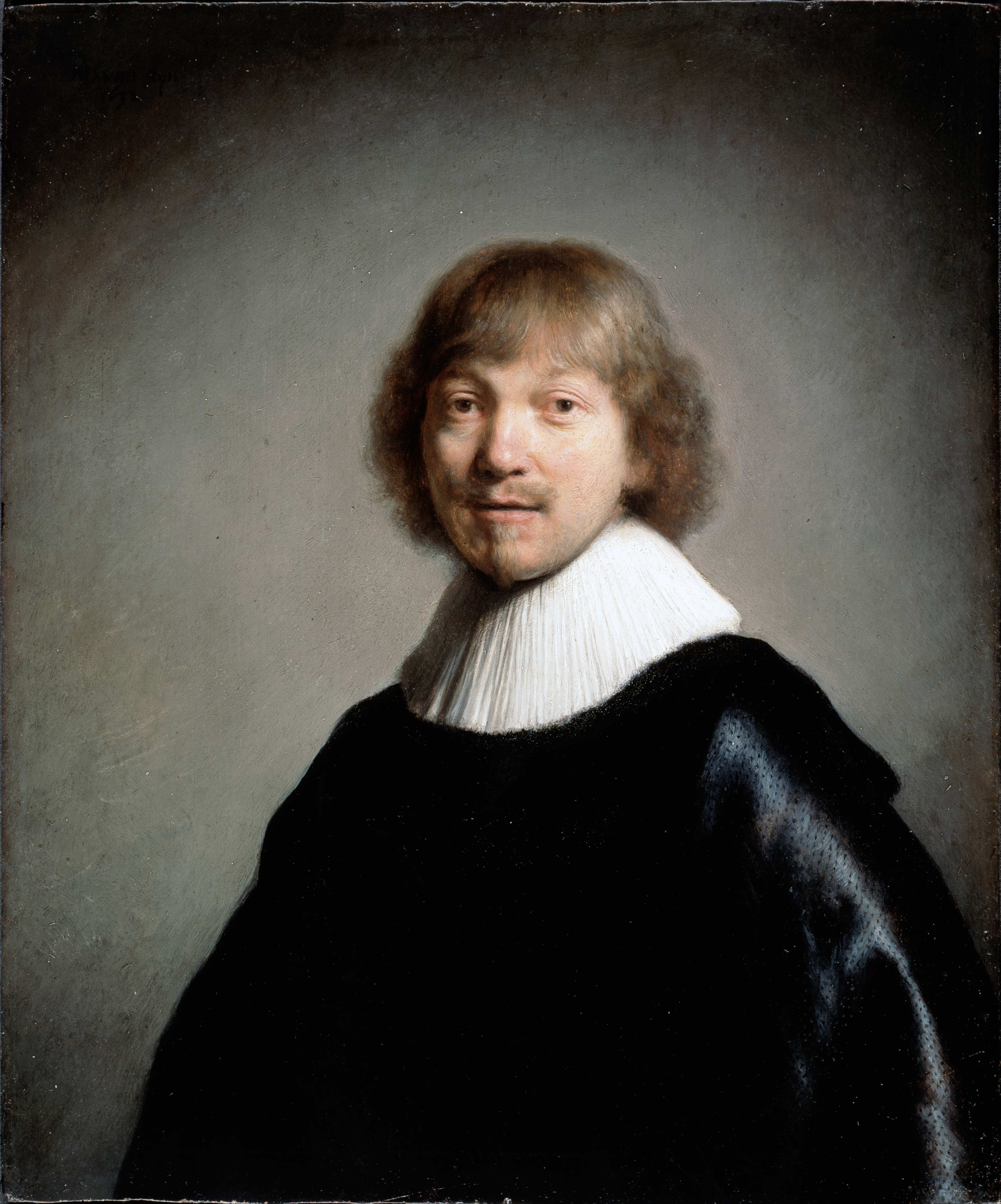
- Artist: Rembrandt
- Year: 1632
- Medium: oil paint, oak panel
- Dimensions: 29.9 cm (11.8 in) × 24.9 cm (9.8 in)
- Location: Dulwich Picture Gallery
- Owner: Francis Bourgeois

Portrait of Jacob de Gheyn III is a 1632 oil on oak panel portrait by Rembrandt of the engraver Jacob de Gheyn III, now in Dulwich Picture Gallery. It is smaller than most of Rembrandt's works, measuring only 29.9 by 24.9 centimetres (11.8 by 9.8 inches). It has been stolen numerous times and its size is one factor that has contributed to its numerous thefts.

== The commission ==
Maurits Huygens and de Gheyn had commissioned Rembrandt to paint them in identical formats and he did so upon the same oak panel. The friends had agreed that the first of them to die would receive the painting owned by the other, as evidenced by inscriptions on their reverse. They were reunited when de Gheyn died. Maurits Huygens survived De Gheyn by less than a year however, and his brother Constantijn Huygens was so heartbroken that he stopped writing for a long period. Dendrochronological research has revealed that Rembrandt also made a self-portrait in the same year with a panel from the same wood:

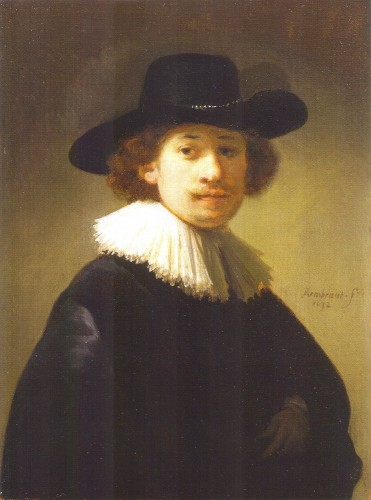
Self-portrait

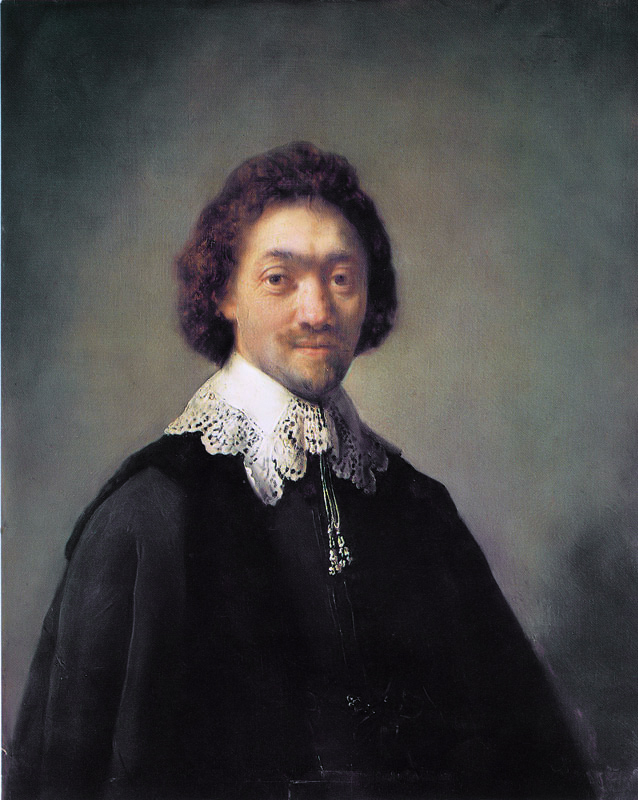
Pendent of Maurits Huygens

== Thefts ==
The painting has been given the moniker "takeaway Rembrandt" as it has been stolen four times since 1966 – the most recorded of any painting.

Between 14 August 1981 and 3 September 1981, the painting was taken from Dulwich Picture Gallery and retrieved when police arrested four men in a taxi who had the painting with them. A little under two years later a burglar smashed a skylight and descended through it into the art gallery, using a crowbar to remove the painting from the wall. The police arrived within three minutes but were too late to apprehend the thief. The painting was missing for three years, eventually being found on 8 October 1986 in a luggage rack at the train station of a British army garrison in Münster, Germany.

The other two times, the painting was found once underneath a bench in a graveyard in Streatham, and once on the back of a bicycle. Each time the painting was returned anonymously with more than one person being charged for its disappearance.

== See also ==
- List of paintings by Rembrandt
- List of heists in the United Kingdom
- Portrait of the Duke of Wellington
