= Jacob de Gheyn III =

Dutch Golden Age engraver (1596–1641)

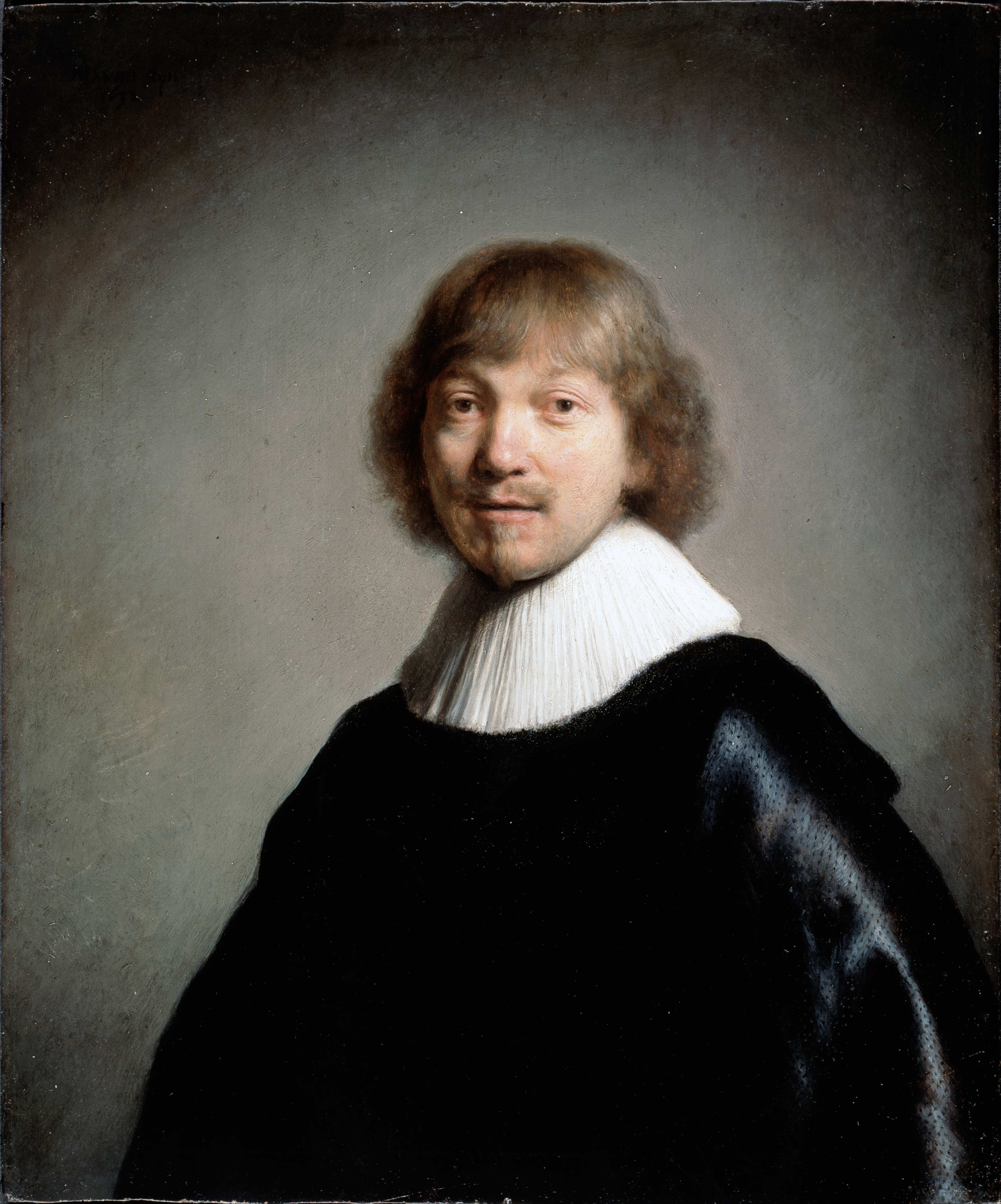
- Portrait of Jacob de Gheyn III by Rembrandt
- Born: Jacob de Gheyn III; 1596; Haarlem
- Died: 1641 (aged 44–45); Utrecht
- Known for: Painting, Engraving
- Movement: Baroque

Jacob de Gheyn III, also known as Jacob III de Gheyn (1596–1641), was a Dutch Golden Age engraver, son of Jacob de Gheyn II, canon of Utrecht (city), and the subject of a 1632 oil painting by Rembrandt. The portrait is half of a pair of pendant portraits. The other piece is a portrait of de Gheyn's friend Maurits Huygens, wearing similar clothing (ruffs and black doublets) and facing the opposite direction.

== Biography ==
De Gheyn learned engraving from his father, who was a favored royal artist who designed a garden in the Hague for the royal family. This was a shared interest with the Huygens family who lived close by (Christiaan Huygens Sr was councillor of state). The younger De Gheyn studied in Leiden with Constantijn and Maurits Huygens, who remained lifelong friends. Aside from tours of London in 1618 with the Huygens brothers and Sweden in 1620, De Gheyn lived in the Hague until 1634, when he moved to Utrecht to become canon of St Mary's church (torn down in the 19th century). His engravings became known though the writings of Aernout van Buchel, who admired his work.
