= Feltham book heist =

2017 rare book heist in west London

In January 2017, thieves stole rare books worth over £2.5 million from a warehouse in Feltham, west London.

== Heist ==
The heist occurred the night of 29 January 2017, at Frontier Forwarding, a customs warehouse in Feltham, near Heathrow in west London, where rare books were stored for postal transit to the 50th Annual California International Antiquarian Book Fair in Oakland. Daniel David and Victor Opariuc cut and entered a hole in the facility's fencing and climbed a wall to its roof. In what sources described as a Mission: Impossible-style entrance, they bored holes into the roof's fiberglass-reinforced skylights and rappelled 40 feet down. They avoided the motion detector alarms near the doors by landing on the building's shelving. Over several hours, the thieves worked through six containers, looking for specific rare books and likely working from a list.

The thieves stole over 160 publications, many from the 15th and 16th centuries, including a 1566 edition of Copernicus's De Revolutionibus Orbium Coelestium (alone worth about £215,000), a 1569 edition of Dante's Divine Comedy, a 1651 edition of da Vinci's A Treatise on Painting, a 1777 edition of Newton's Philosophiæ Naturalis Principia Mathematica, among other works by Aesop, Euripides, and Galileo. The books were worth over £2 million, taken from three separate high-end dealers. Authorities believed the heist was commissioned by specialist collector, as the goods would be impossible to auction based on their unique rarity. A representative of the Antiquarian Booksellers Association said that this kind of heist was unprecedented for their industry, but believed the heist was opportunistic rather than ordered by a specialist.

== Recovery ==
Over the next three years, police conducted 45 raids across three countries, charging 13 people en route to recovering 200 books beneath the floorboards of a house in rural Romania.

== See also ==
- List of heists in the United Kingdom
