= Securitas depot robbery =

2006 heist in Tonbridge, England

Coordinates: 51.1912°N 0.2773°E

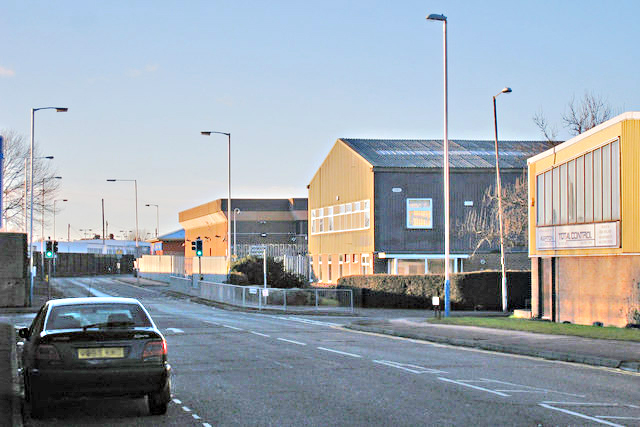
- The depot in Tonbridge, beside the traffic lights
- Date: 21–22 February 2006
- Time: 18:30–03:15 GMT
- Outcome: Largest cash robbery in British history (£52,996,760)
- Suspects: 36 arrests
- Charges: Conspiracy to rob; Conspiracy to kidnap; Conspiracy to possess firearms; Assisting an offender
- Convictions: Paul Allen (18 years); Ian Bowrem (3 years, 9 months); Jetmir Buçpapa (life); Roger Coutts (life); Emir Hysenaj (20 years); Lee Murray (25 years); Stuart Royle (life); Lea Rusha (life)

The 2006 Securitas depot robbery in Tonbridge, England, was the UK's largest cash heist. It began with a kidnapping on the evening of 21 February 2006 and ended in the early hours of 22 February, when seven criminals stole almost £53 million (equivalent to £91.59 million in 2025). The gang left behind another £154 million because they did not have the means to transport it.

After doing surveillance and placing an insider at the Securitas depot, the gang abducted the manager and his family. The same night, they tricked their way inside the building, and tied up 14 workers at gunpoint. The criminals stole £52,996,760 in used and unused sterling banknotes, the property of the Bank of England. Most of the getaway vehicles were found in the following week, one containing £1.3 million in stolen currency. In raids by Kent Police, £9 million was recovered in Welling and £8 million in Southborough. By 2007, 36 people had been arrested in relation to the crime.

At trial at the Old Bailey in London in 2007, five people were convicted, and received long sentences, including the inside man, Emir Hysenaj. A woman who had made prosthetic disguises for the gang gave evidence in return for the charges against her being dropped. Lee Murray, the alleged mastermind, had fled to Morocco with his friend and accomplice Paul Allen. He successfully fought extradition to the UK and was imprisoned there for the robbery. Allen was extradited and after a second trial in 2008 was jailed in the UK; upon his release he was shot and injured in 2019. By 2016, £32 million remained unrecovered, and several suspects were still at large. In February 2026 chief constable Tim Smith of Kent Police made a fresh appeal to recover the £32 million.

== Depot ==
The Bank of England prints pound sterling (£) banknotes in Debden, Epping Forest. In 2006 it was outsourcing the distribution of currency to five companies, Group 4 Securicor, Halifax Bank of Scotland, Post Office Ltd, Royal Bank of Scotland and Securitas. There were 28 centres across England and Wales holding new currency and which stored used currency as it was returned, either to be redistributed or destroyed. Until 2001, Barclays had stored its own supplies of cash; it had built the depot at Medway House, Vale Road, Tonbridge, in Kent, in 1980, choosing the location because it was close to three police stations that were always open (at Royal Tunbridge Wells, Sevenoaks and Tonbridge itself). Medway House was just 300 m (330 yd) away from the Tonbridge station and was also near the Angel shopping centre. The first building on Vale Road was a Kwik Fit garage and the second was the depot.

Barclays outsourced the distribution of money to Securitas Cash Management (a subsidiary of Securitas) in 2001, and by 2006 Securitas was running the Tonbridge depot. It operated non-stop with 80 full-time staff split across three shifts; most of the work was sorting and counting banknotes which arrived by armoured transport and were sent out again to restock cash machines. The cash was bundled into bricks, which were wrapped in differently coloured plastic according to denomination: £5 bricks were green (£2,500); £10 bricks were blue (£5,000); £20 bricks were red (£5,000); £50 bricks were yellow (£12,500).

The manager of the depot was Colin Dixon. He lived in Herne Bay with his wife and their young child. Owing to the nature of his job, he had been trained not to tell his colleagues where he lived and to drive to work every day using a different route. The family owned two cars, and he would alternate which car he used. He had been told that if he was ever stopped by the police when driving that he should stay in his car and give the officers a piece of paper describing his job, then follow them to the nearest station, where he would co-operate with their enquiries.

== Conspiracy ==
A criminal gang began to study the depot with the intention of robbing it. Men later convicted of conspiracy included Paul Allen, Jetmir Buçpapa, Roger Coutts, Emir Hysenaj, Lee Murray, Stuart Royle, and Lea Rusha. Albanians Buçpapa and Hysenaj were childhood friends who met at school in Bajram Curri. They did not mention this in court, claiming not to know each other at all. Lea Rusha, a roofer and cage fighter, met Buçpapa (a bouncer) at a mixed martial arts (MMA) training session run by Rusha at the Angel Centre, near the depot. Rusha also knew Lee Murray through MMA; Murray was stopped by Kent Police on 28 July 2005 while in his car on a road overlooking the depot, together with two unidentified men. As well as being a cage fighter, Murray was also a drug dealer.

Hysenaj signed up with a recruitment agency which supplied workers to Medway House. He was first given a job at Royal Victoria Place shopping centre in Royal Tunbridge Wells, and then at the end of 2005 offered work at the depot. At his training he asked questions about security measures and passed the information to Buçpapa, who told Rusha. On 6 January 2006, mobile phone records displayed at trial indicated that Allen, Coutts, Murray, Royle and Rusha were present at a meeting at Royle's house. Murray visited a surveillance shop in Derbyshire to buy a spy camera and recording device, with the intention of giving it to Hysenaj. Despite warning by the shop owner to be careful not to get glue on the lens of the camera when placing it in position, someone from the gang did precisely that, so Murray sent his friends Allen and Keyinde "Kane" Patterson back to the shop to get it replaced. The shop owner fixed the camera and attached it to a belt, which Hysenaj used to film inside the depot. On their way back, the men were stopped by Nottinghamshire Police for driving at 185 km/h (115 mph). Allen had broken the speed limit while driving on an expired provisional licence, and was in a car he did not own which had no MOT and no insurance, so it was impounded by the police.

Several days before the robbery, Murray went clubbing in London and crashed his yellow Ferrari 360 Modena sports car on the New Kent Road the next morning. Murray fled the scene and was arrested by four police officers nearby. He was charged with assault in a case that never came to trial. When he had abandoned his car he left behind two burner phones containing numbers of other gang members and three photographs from the club, which showed him associating with Allen and Patterson. The police later recovered these items from the impounded car. Murray had accidentally recorded himself on one of the phones, talking to Rusha about how to carry out the robbery.

== Robbery ==
Securitas depot robbery (Kent)

In the early evening of Tuesday, 21 February 2006, Dixon, the depot manager, was driving home along the A249 when he was pulled over just outside Stockbury, a village northeast of Maidstone, by what he presumed was an unmarked police car. The Volvo S60 had flashing blue lights in its grille and one of the two uniformed officers came to Dixon's window, asking him to turn off his engine and leave the keys in the ignition. Breaching protocol, Dixon followed the officer's order to step out of his car and to sit in the other car, where he was handcuffed. His car was moved off the road and the Volvo travelled west on the M20 motorway to the West Malling bypass. The criminals play-acted driving him to a police station before revealing their deception and threatening him with a gun at Mereworth. He was tied up and transferred into a white van which drove to Elderden Farm near Staplehurst.

The two men impersonating police officers next drove to Dixon's home in Herne Bay and spoke to Lynn Dixon, telling her that her husband had crashed his car and that she and her son should accompany them to the hospital as quickly as possible. When she got into the car Lynn Dixon realised it was not a real police car and the men told her she was being abducted; they took her to the farm as well. Colin Dixon was then interrogated about the layout of the depot and warned at gunpoint that the lives of his family members depended upon his actions.

Around 01:00 on Wednesday, 22 February 2006, three vehicles headed to the depot. Lynn Dixon and her son were held in the back of a 7.5 tonne white Renault Midlum lorry; Colin Dixon and the other gang members travelled in a Vauxhall Vectra and the Volvo. The vehicles split up, and the Volvo arrived at the depot at 01:21. Dixon and a gang member dressed as a police officer got out of the car and walked towards the pedestrian entrance. Dixon rang the bell and looked through the window at the control room operator. Instead of querying why Dixon was returning at night or why he was with an officer, the inexperienced operator opened the door and let the two men through the airlock into the building. The entire robbery was filmed on the building's CCTV and when Kent Police later reviewed the footage, they nicknamed this gang member "Policeman". "Policeman" subdued the operator and, without being asked, Dixon pressed the button which opened the gate and allowed the vehicles to enter the yard.

The rest of the gang now entered the building. One man was later nicknamed "Stopwatch", because he was wearing a stopwatch to time the robbery in an echo of the film Ocean's Eleven. Others were called "Shorty", "Hoodie" and "Mr Average". The criminals' faces were hidden by balaclavas and they were armed with handguns, shotguns, AK-47 assault rifles and a Škorpion submachine gun. Dixon urged staff to comply with the gang's commands, and 14 workers were tied up. Nobody pressed an alarm. The seven members of the gang attempted to load metal cages full of banknotes into the lorry and found they were too heavy, so one criminal tried to drive the Lansing Linde power lifter and the rest shoved the hostages out of the way. It was difficult to manoeuvre the lifter and a Securitas worker was ordered to drive it; when he kept deliberately crashing it, Dixon was told to use a pallet mover. The worker then wedged the power lifter between the tail lift of the truck and the loading bay, rendering it useless. When Dixon pumped the pallet mover up, "Hoodie" became suspicious and pointed a gun at his head; frustrated by the slow progress, the other gang members grabbed bundles of money in their hands and filled up shopping trolleys. The criminals stole £52,996,760 in used and unused banknotes; another £154 million would not fit in the lorry and they had to leave it behind. In total they took seventeen cages and three trolleys full of banknotes.

The staff workers were left locked up inside empty cages, as were Lynn Dixon and her son. No alarm had been set off and the gang ordered the staff to stay still when they left at 02:44. At 03:15, when they were sure the robbers had gone, the staff triggered an alarm which called the police. The police arrived and began the investigation by interviewing the staff and taking their clothes and their DNA profiles.

== Investigation and arrests ==
The following day (Thursday, 23 February 2006) Securitas and their insurers offered a reward of £2 million for any information about the heist, which Crimestoppers stated was the largest reward ever offered in the UK. Securitas gave the Bank of England £25 million as an initial reimbursement. Kent Police said the heist had been meticulously planned by organised crime and that at least £20 million had been stolen, possibly as much as £50 million. By the evening of 23 February, two arrests had been made in South London: a man aged 29 and a woman aged 31 were detained at separate houses on suspicion of conspiracy to commit robbery. A third person, a 41-year-old woman, was arrested at a branch of the Portman Building Society in Bromley on suspicion of handling stolen goods. This woman was innocent and she told The Guardian she was planning to sue the police on account of "the most distressing experience of my life". As news of the robbery reached the newspapers, Hysenaj was told he had the day off work and went to see the Levellers at the Assembly Hall Theatre in Royal Tunbridge Wells with his girlfriend.

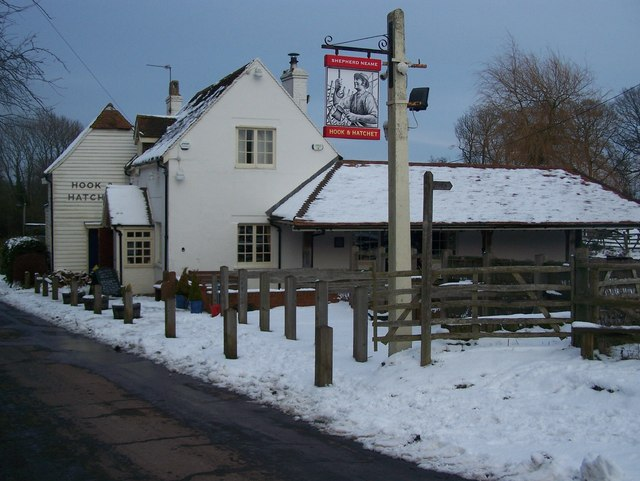
The Hook and Hatchet pub, where the van was found

The same day, police discovered some of the vehicles implicated in the robbery: a former Parcelforce van had been left at the Hook and Hatchet pub in Hucking, near Maidstone; a Volvo and a Vauxhall Vectra had been abandoned near Leeds Castle; Dixon's Nissan Almera was located at the Cock Horse pub in Detling. The next day, Friday 24 February, discarded metal cages and other paraphernalia from the crime scene were found at Friningham Farm near Detling, on land rented by a friend of the owner of Elderden Farm.

A white Ford Transit van owned by a friend of Buçpapa and Rusha was reported to be in the car park of the Ashford International Hotel. When the police checked the van, they found a balaclava, a bulletproof vest and the Škorpion submachine gun. Two bags were opened which contained over £1.3 million in stolen banknotes. On Saturday, 25 February 2006, armed police officers raided the homes of Buçpapa and Rusha, encountering Buçpapa's wife at their house on Hadlow Road in Tonbridge. At Rusha's house in Lambersart Close in Southborough, police found surveillance footage of Dixon's home, weapons and plans of the depot. In the shed they discovered balaclavas, Royal Mail clothing and a radio scanner tuned to a frequency used by the emergency services. On Sunday afternoon, Kent Police arrested Stuart Royle and another man in Tankerton, between Whitstable and Herne Bay, after shooting out a tyre of the BMW car he was driving. On Monday, police arrested Buçpapa and Rusha in Deptford, London, after shooting out the tyres of their car. The following day, the white 7.5 tonne lorry which had transported the loot was located at a hire centre and Elderden Farm was searched. At the farm £30,000 in stolen notes was found in the boot of a car and £105,600 hidden under a dead tree in the orchard.

Four days after the heist, Murray and Allen fled the UK. After visiting Amsterdam, they travelled to Morocco, where they spent money extravagantly on houses, jewellery and narcotics. Back in the UK, police officers raided a unit on the Graves Industrial Estate in Welling on 2 March. They broke open a shipping container, finding an estimated £7 million in cash, which was later announced to be £9,655,040. They also found £50,000 in a bin bag elsewhere. The discoveries were connected to Roger Coutts, a van dealer who rented the yard and kept his boat there. The same day as the find, three people appeared at Maidstone Magistrates' Court: the owner of the farm was charged with conspiracy to commit robbery, handling stolen goods, and three charges of kidnapping; Royle was charged with conspiracy to commit robbery; a third person was charged with handling stolen goods. All three were remanded in custody. Royle had hired the Renault lorry used in the heist in his own name.

Buçpapa and Rusha appeared in court on 3 March, each facing the same charge of conspiracy to commit robbery. They were remanded in custody until a preliminary hearing at Maidstone Crown Court on 13 March. By 3 March, the number of people arrested had grown to fourteen. Two days later, the police discovered a hoard of £8,601,990 in a lock-up garage in Southborough near to Rusha's home. The money was stuffed into eighteen laundry bags and suitcases. The garage was rented by a man who sublet it to Rusha's cousin, who was supposed to pay £10 rent every week but was two weeks behind.

In June a businessman named Ian Bowrem was arrested as he drove around the M25 motorway. In his Mercedes-Benz, the police found almost £1 million, of which £380,000 was made up of £50 notes from the robbery. Bowrem refused to say who had given him the money and was eventually sentenced to three years and nine months in prison. Police believed he was carrying out Missing Trader Intra-Community (MTIC) fraud to launder the stolen money. Also in June, Allen and Murray were two out of four men arrested in Morocco's capital Rabat after a three-month investigation. They were charged with possession of drugs, false imprisonment and assaulting the police. In England another man had been arrested as part of the police investigation and was released without having been charged; he then fled to Northern Cyprus in December 2006. By the year's end, Kent Police had recovered £21 million and had asked the Home Office for at least £6 million to cover both investigating the case and future spending on trial preparations. By 2007, 36 people had been arrested.

== Trials ==
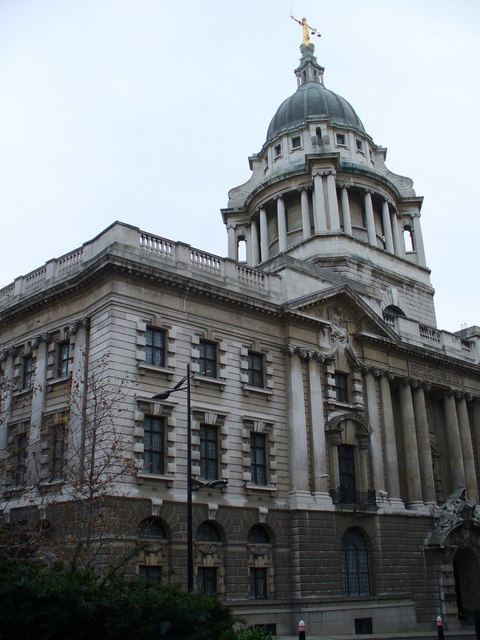
The Old Bailey in London

The trial of eight people, including Jetmir Buçpapa, Roger Coutts, Emir Hysenaj, Stuart Royle and Lea Rusha, began on 26 June 2007 at the Old Bailey in London. These five men were all charged with conspiracy to rob, conspiracy to kidnap and conspiracy to possess firearms. The prosecution was led by Sir John Nutting and the High Court judge was Mr Justice David Penry-Davey.

The role of manager Colin Dixon was examined, the defence barristers highlighting "co-incidences" in his conduct which might be interpreted as suggesting he was the inside man. It was noted that he had breached regulations in several ways: he possessed two keys for the vault, when he was supposed to only have one; he had taken photographs of the depot and its workers, which were found on his computer at home; he had told CCTV engineers to postpone a visit; he had waited thirty minutes before raising the alarm after the robbers had departed, despite knowing that if they had left there was no way for them to get back inside. It then emerged that the inside man had actually been Emir Hysenaj. Buçpapa had called Hysenaj at 02:38 as the gang left the depot; Hysenaj had not picked up but the police could show the mobile phone records to prove the call had been made.

During the trial, a woman who had made prosthetic disguises for the gang decided to turn Queen's evidence in return for her charges being dropped. On 28 January 2008, the jury returned guilty verdicts for Buçpapa, Coutts, Hysenaj, Royle and Rusha. Buçpapa, Coutts, Royle and Rusha were given life sentences with an order to serve a minimum of fifteen years. The next day, Emir Hysenaj was sentenced to twenty years in prison with an order that he serve a minimum of ten. The judge also recommended that both the Albanian men be deported after they had served their sentences. The owner of the farm and another man were each acquitted. The second man had been paid £6,000 in stolen notes to make signs on the side of one of the vans used in the heist, but had not been involved in planning the crime.

At the beginning of the second trial in October 2008, presided over again by Penry-Davey, prosecutors dropped charges against the girlfriends of Buçpapa, Royle and Rusha. Paul Allen (who had been extradited from Morocco) and another man were charged with conspiracy to rob, conspiracy to kidnap and conspiracy to possess firearms. Allen was held on remand in the high-security HM Prison Belmarsh and driven to court escorted by a police helicopter which cost £30,000 a day. A court order made during the first trial to preserve Lee Murray's anonymity was lifted and he was named as the leader of the gang. In January 2009 the jury were unable to reach agreement on whether Allen was guilty or not and found the other man not guilty. A retrial was ordered for Allen in September and he was held on remand until then. At the ensuing trial, Allen pleaded guilty to the three charges of conspiracy which he had previously denied, admitting his involvement but denying both that he had handled firearms and that he had been one of the seven men who went inside the depot. He received a sentence of eighteen years' imprisonment and served six. The 1,063 days spent on remand were taken off the sentence.

In June 2009 Murray was confirmed to have Moroccan nationality and therefore he won his fight against extradition from Morocco to the UK. He remained in prison in Salé and one year later stood trial for the robbery. He was convicted and jailed for ten years; when he appealed the length of this sentence, it was raised to 25 years. Kent Police Detective Superintendent Mick Judge said "I'm pleased Murray will now begin serving a significant prison sentence for his part in the Tonbridge robbery." Murray was claimed by other gang members to have been the leader. The police believed he had worn a disguise when taking Dixon hostage, and that he was the person dubbed "Stopwatch" caught on CCTV directing the robbers to move as quickly as possible at the depot. The other man who had abducted Dixon was believed to be Rusha wearing a fake ginger beard.

== Later events ==
Securitas stopped the handling of cash and sold the Tonbridge depot to Vaultex, a company run by Barclays and HSBC. Howard Sounes published a book about the crime in 2009, entitled Heist: The True Story of the World's Biggest Cash Robbery. A decade after the robbery, in 2016, £32 million had still not been recovered. In the opinion of a former detective superintendent, the cash would have quickly been absorbed into organised crime networks. Farmers who lived near the robbed depot reported harassment from criminals convinced that some of the money was buried on their land. Several people escaped capture and were suspected by police to be living off the proceeds of the crime in the West Indies and Northern Cyprus.

In February 2013 Malcolm Constable, who was believed by his brother Derek to be associated with the robbery, was found dead of a self-inflicted shotgun wound in Canterbury. Kent Police stated they had no record of any incidents involving Constable. Paul Allen was severely injured on 11 July 2019 when he was shot at a home in north London; he was taken to hospital in a critical condition. He survived, but was reported to be paralysed below the upper chest and as of 2025 uses a wheelchair. By February 2021, eight men had been arrested in connection with the attack. In 2025, three men were convicted of conspiracy to murder in relation to Allen's shooting.

In 2016 an appeal by Jetmir Buçpapa to serve the rest of his sentence in Albania was rejected by the Secretary of State for Justice. The following year on judicial review the decision was found to be irrational. Buçpapa was released from HM Prison Belmarsh in 2020 and deported to Albania. On New Year's Day 2022, he married for a second time, in his home town of Tropoja. A four-part television documentary about Lee Murray called Catching Lightning was released in 2023.

== Similar incidents ==
Other Securitas depots had been previously targeted in the mid-1990s, when ram-raiders in Liverpool and Manchester had stolen more than £2 million. The City bonds robbery of 2 May 1990 was a heist in which £291.9 million (equivalent to £720M in 2025) worth of bearer bonds was stolen from a monney courier on his way to the Bank of England, one of the largest heists in world history. The Northern Bank robbery in Belfast was a cash theft in 2004 in which £26.5M was stolen (equivalent to £47.8M in 2025), at the time the biggest cash theft in UK history. This record was broken by the Tonbridge heist. The largest cash heist in global history took place in March 2003, when almost £695M (equivalent to £1.3B in 2025) was stolen from the Central Bank of Iraq, shortly after the United States began the 2003 invasion of Iraq.

== See also ==
- List of bank robbers and robberies
- List of heists in the United Kingdom
