= Jacob de Gheyn II =

Dutch painter & engraver (c.1565–1629)

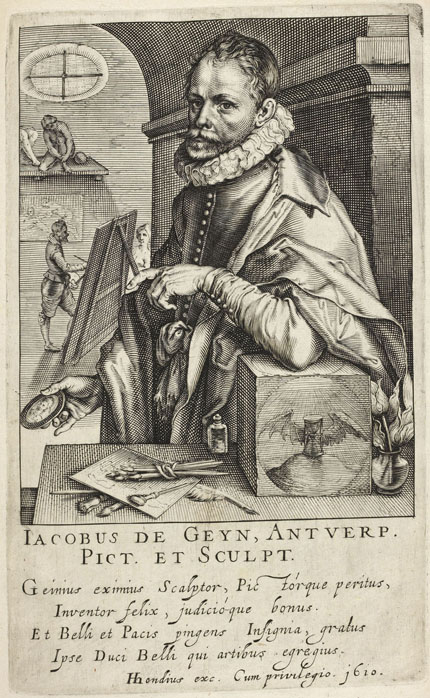
Portrait of "Jacobus de Geyn, Antwerp", by Hendrik Hondius I, from his "Pictorum", 1610

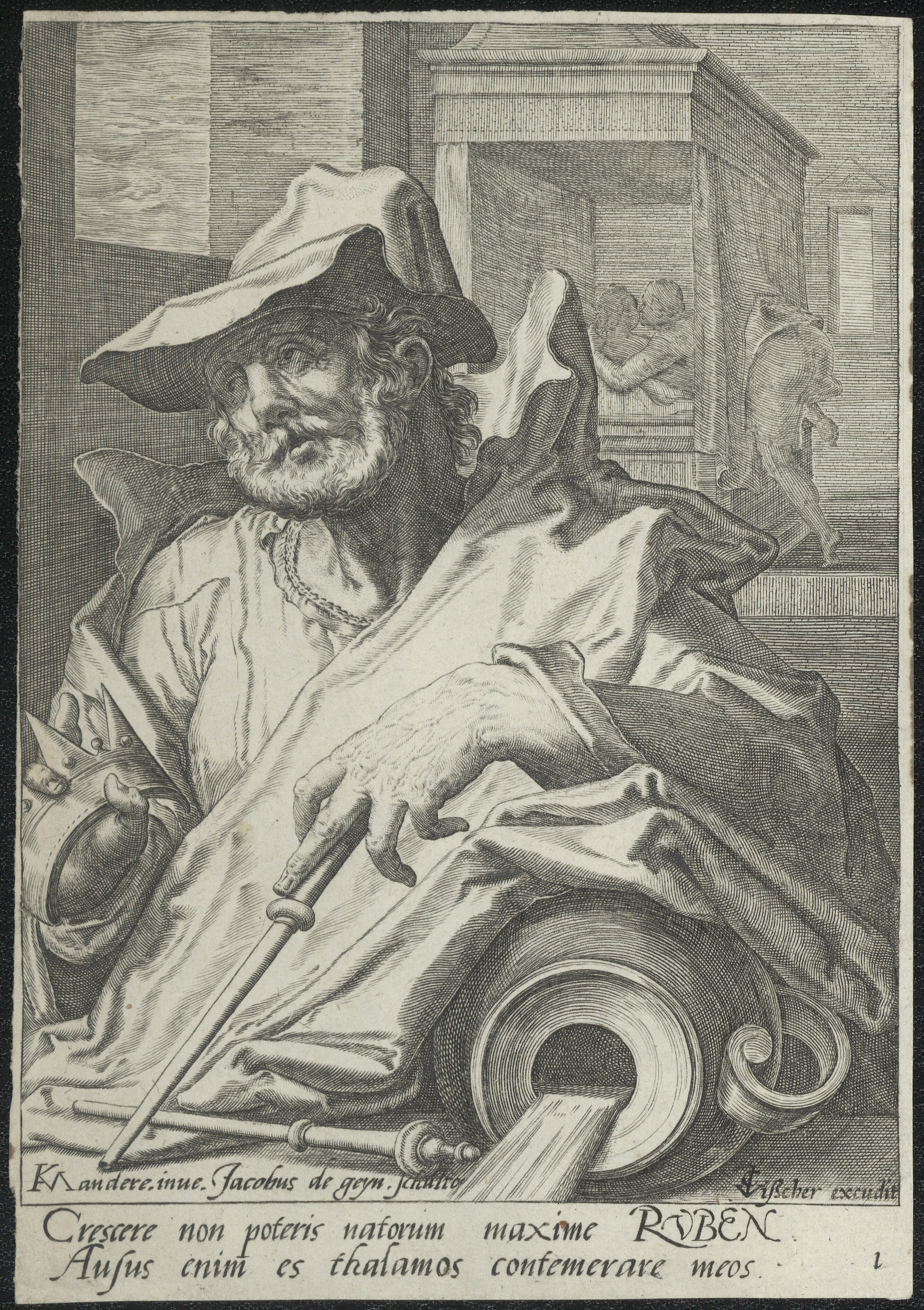
Print: Ruben, Son of Jacob. Made after the example of Karel van Mander.

Jacob de Gheyn II (also Jacques de Gheyn II) (c. 1565 – 29 March 1629) was a Dutch painter and engraver, whose work shows the transition from Northern Mannerism to Dutch realism over the course of his career.

== Biography ==
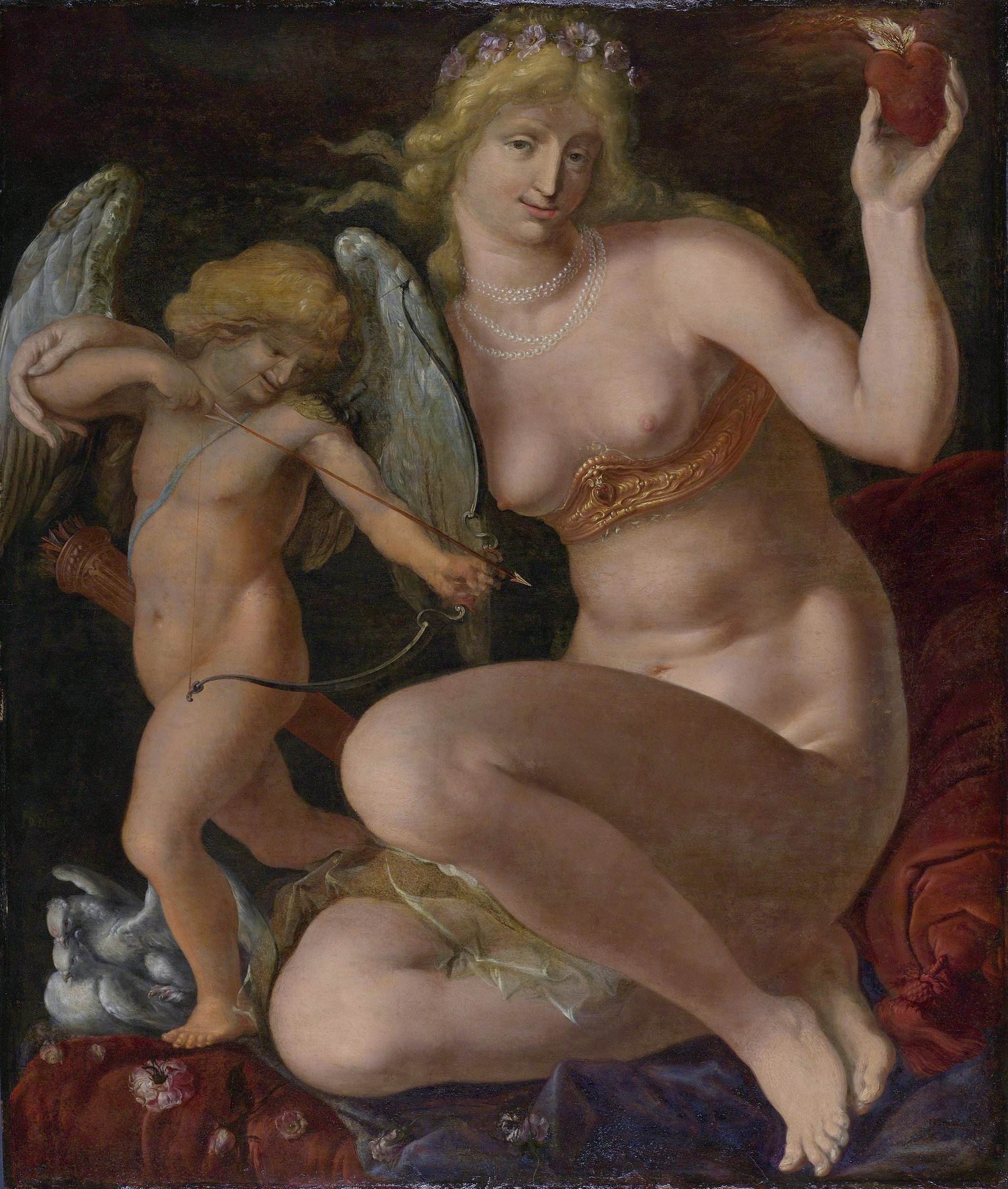
Portrait of "Venus and Cupid", c.1605-1610

De Gheyn was born in Antwerp and received his first training from his father, Jacob de Gheyn I, a glass painter, engraver, and draftsman. In 1585, he moved to Haarlem, where he studied under Hendrik Goltzius for the next five years. He moved again, to Leiden, in the middle of the 1590s. His work attracted the attention of wealthy sponsors, and his first commission was from Maurice of Nassau, Prince of Orange for an engraving of the Siege of Geertruidenberg. This event, from 27 March to 24 June 1593, had been more of a demonstration of power by Prince Maurits, than an actual war, and had even attracted tourists. As a publicity stunt, the siege and its subsequent engraving were successful in propagating an image of Prince Maurits as an able general.

Around 1600, de Gheyn abandoned engraving, and focused on painting and etching. Moving to The Hague in 1605, he was employed often by Dutch royalty, designing a garden in the Buitenhof for Prince Maurice of Orange which featured the two first grottoes in the Netherlands. After Prince Maurice's death in 1625, de Gheyn worked for his brother, Prince Frederick Henry. De Gheyn painted some of the earliest female nudes, vanitas, and floral still lifes in Dutch art. He is credited with creating over 1,500 drawings, including landscapes and natural history illustrations. He produced 117 engravings for the military manual The Exercise of Armes while living in Amsterdam.

De Gheyn married Eva Stalpaert van der Wiele of Mechelen in 1595. His son, Jacob de Gheyn III, was born in 1596, and grew to become an engraver in his own right, as well as the subject of a portrait by Rembrandt. De Gheyn died in The Hague.

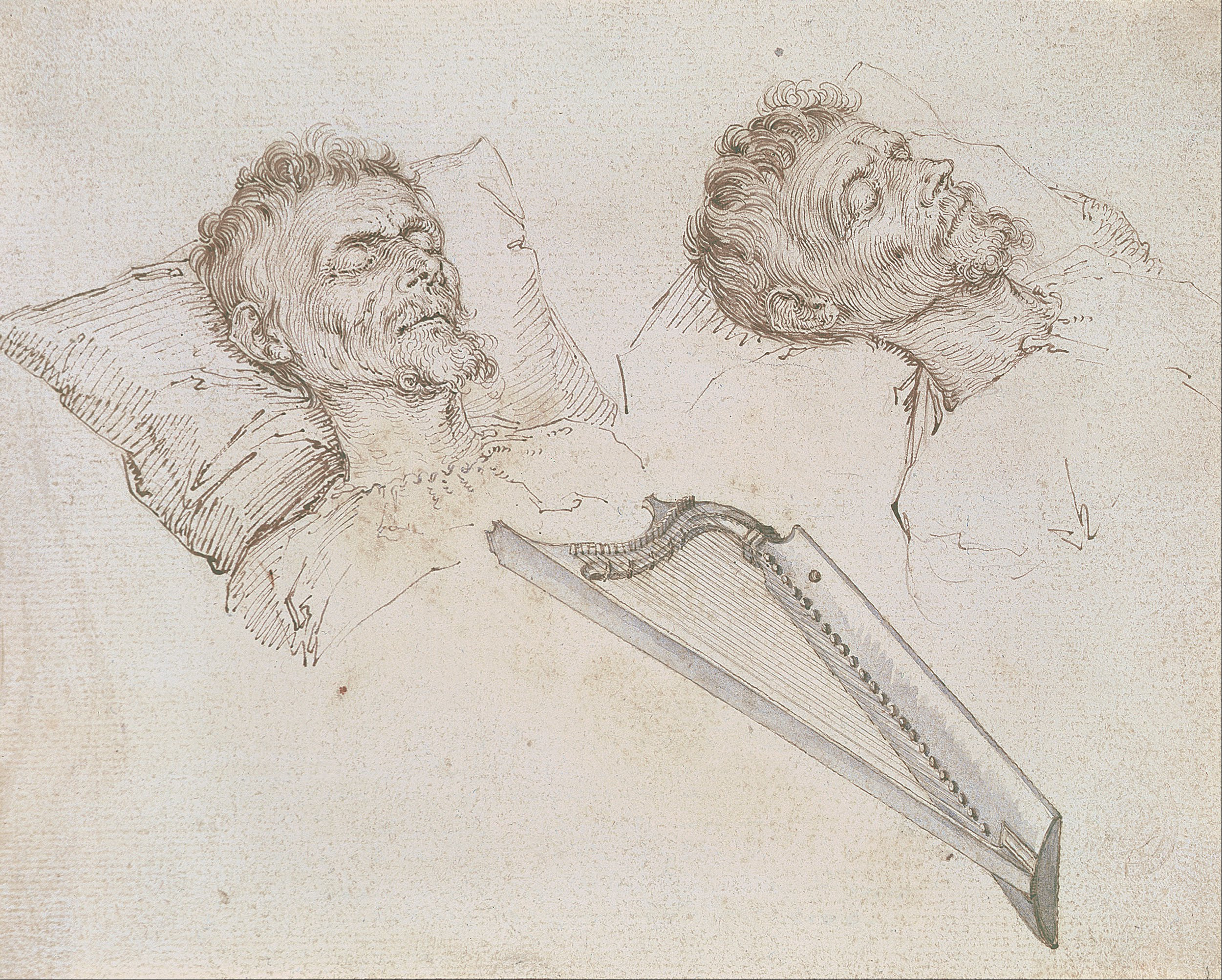
Karel van Mander on his Deathbed

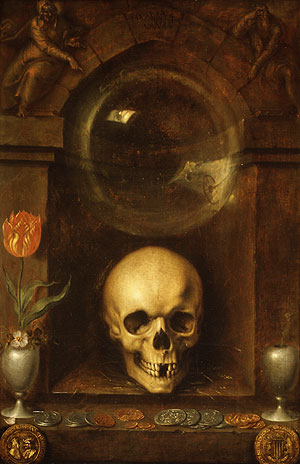
Vanitas Still Life - 1603

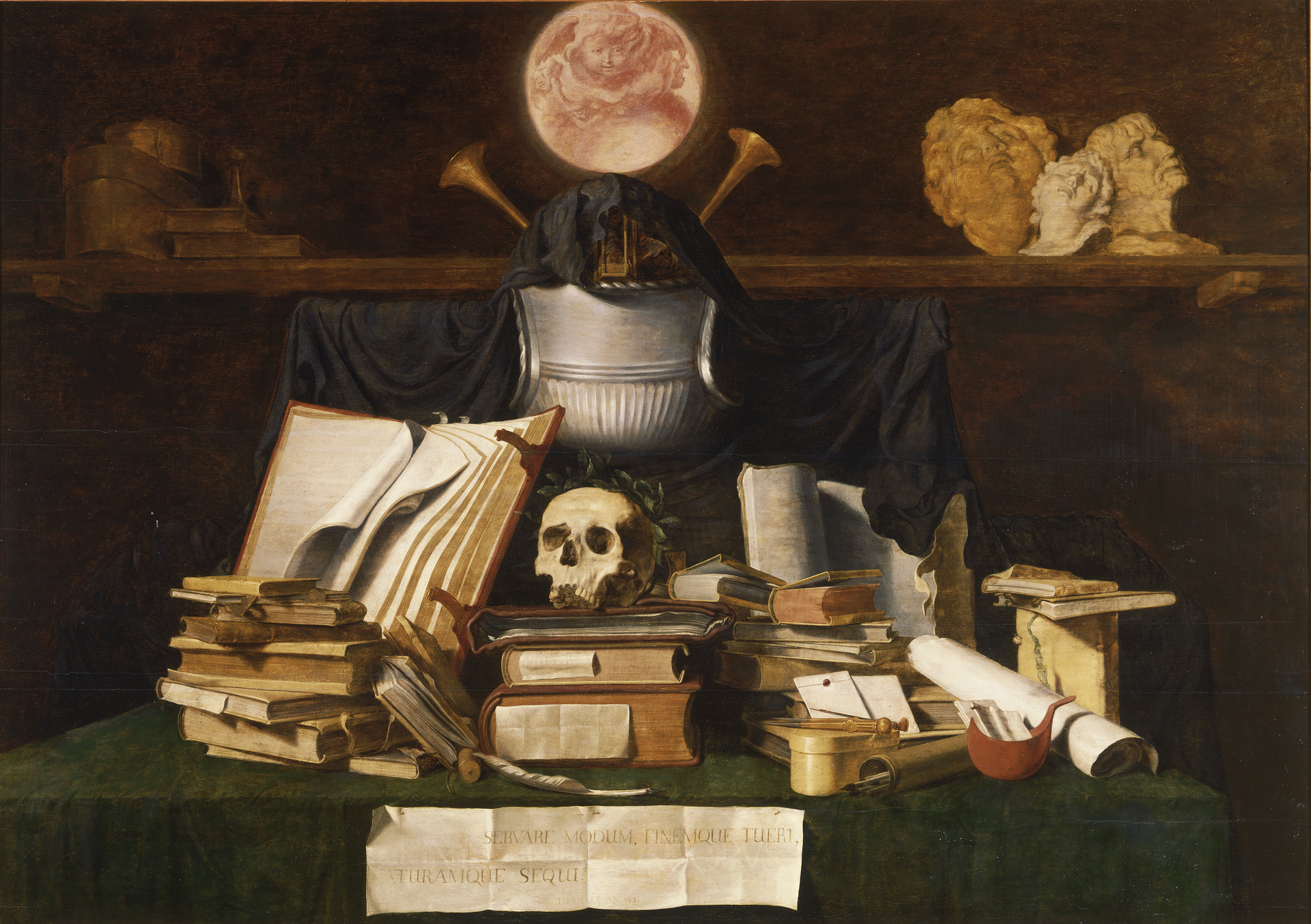
Vanitas Still Life Yale University Art Gallery

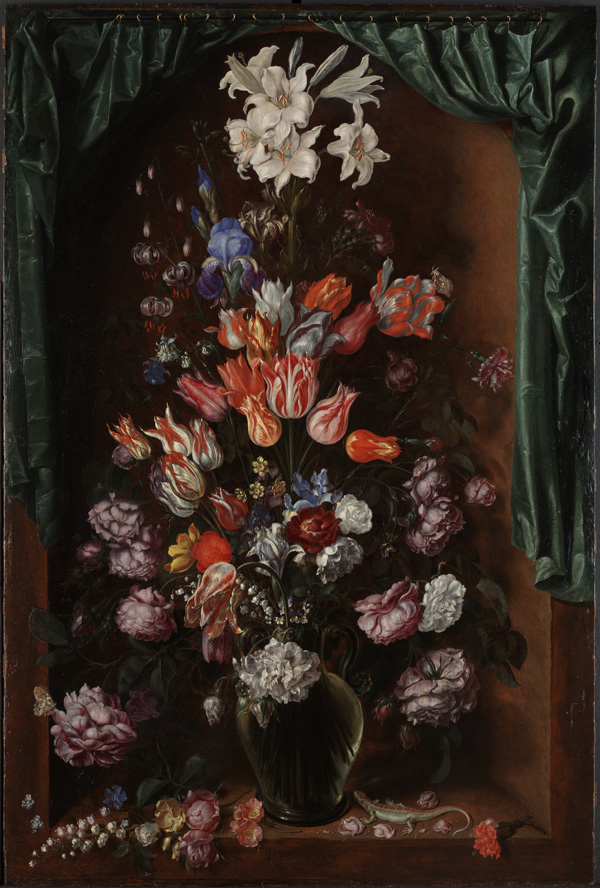
'Vase of Flowers with a Curtain', 1615.

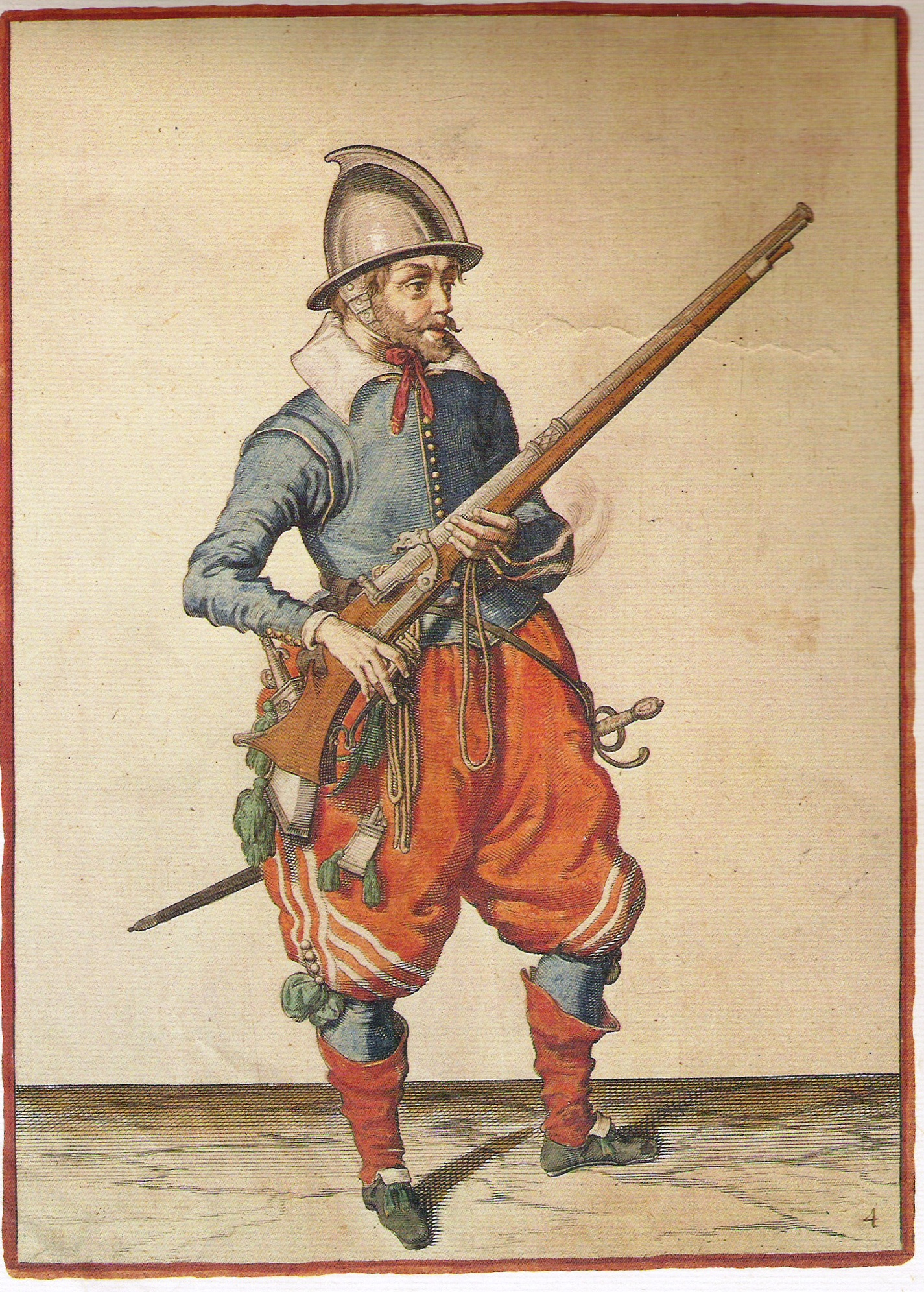
Engraving of musketeer from his Wapenhandelinge

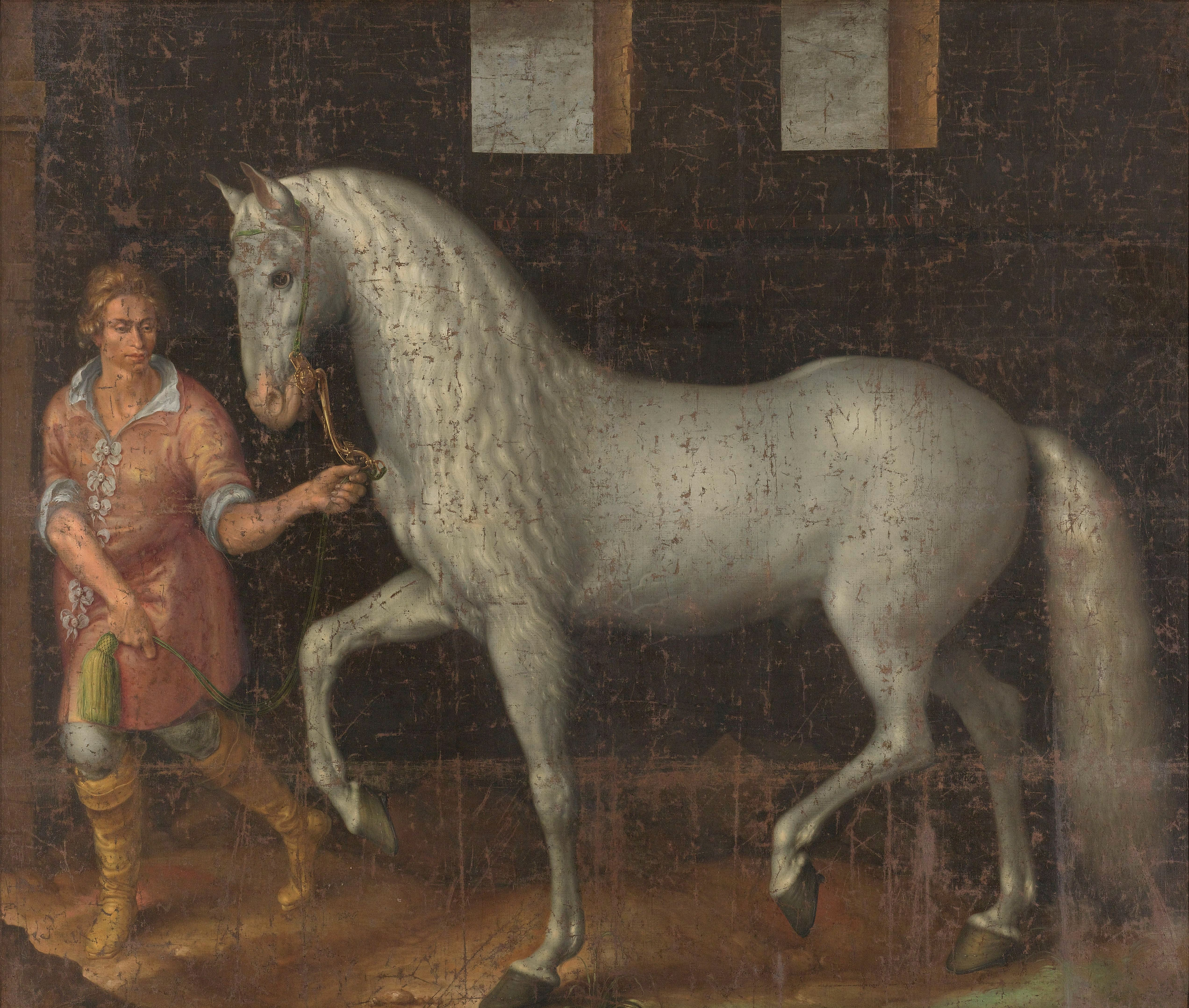
Spanish battle stallion 1603.

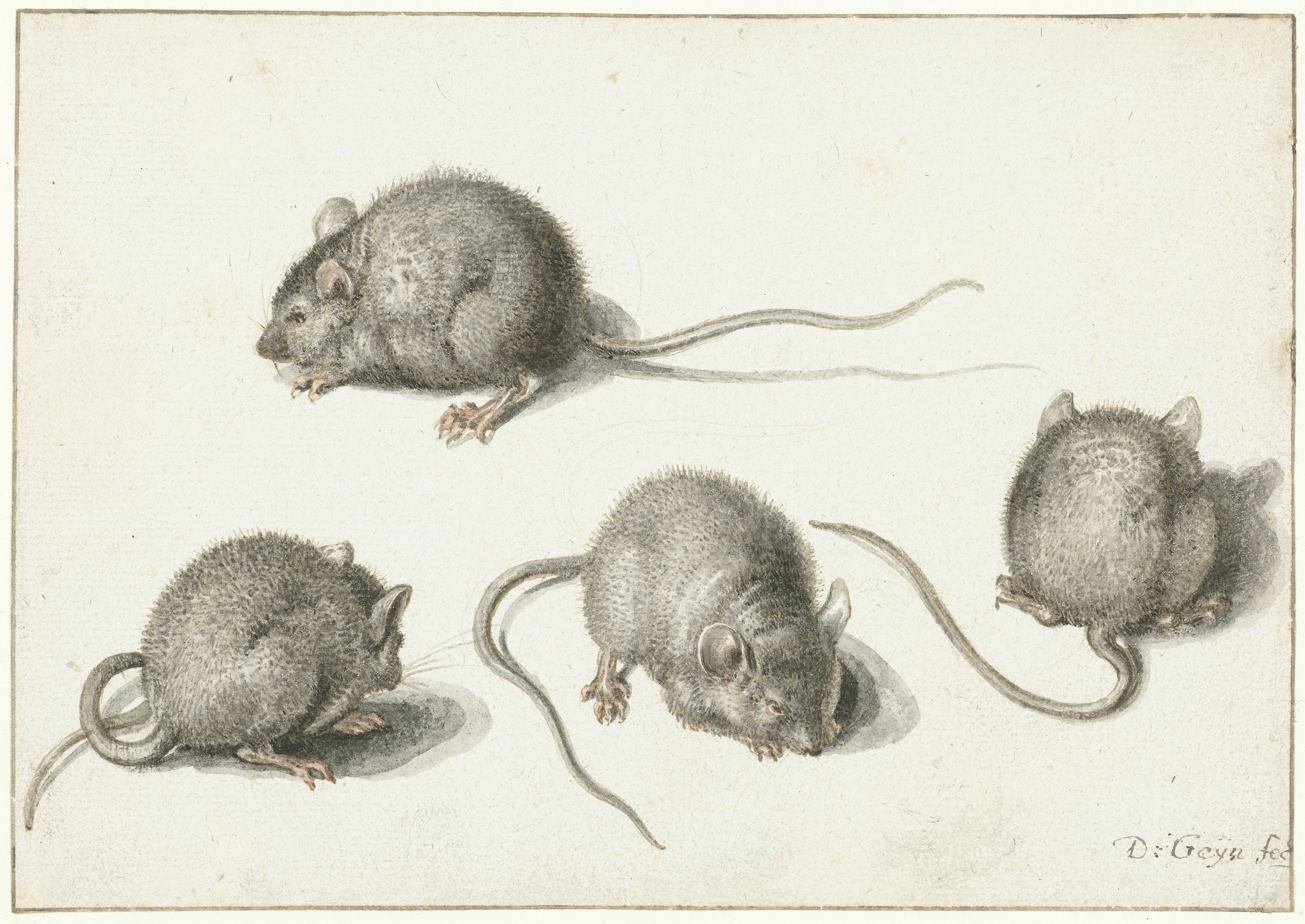
Drawing in waterpaint by Jacques de Gheyn, Four times a mouse
