= Portrait of Georgiana, Duchess of Devonshire =

Painting by Thomas Gainsborough

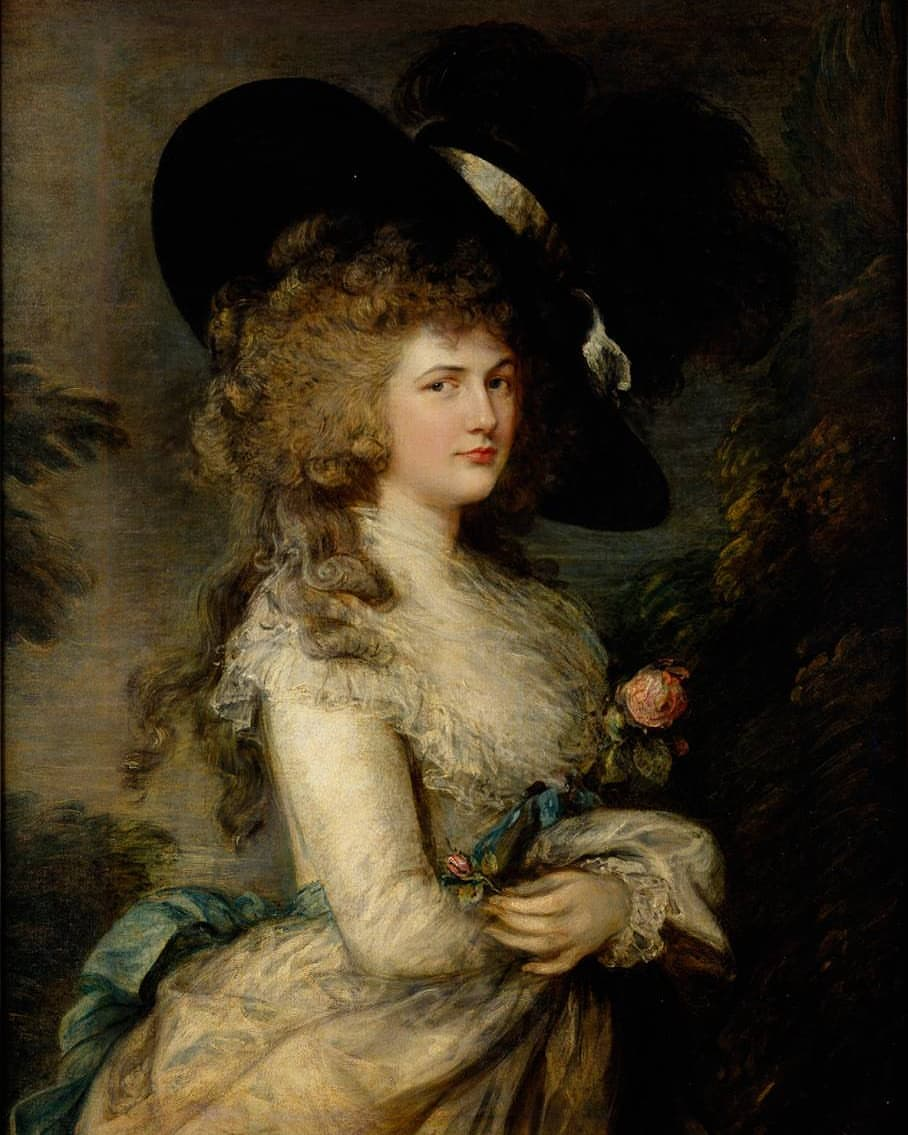
- Artist: Thomas Gainsborough
- Year: 1785-1787
- Medium: Oil on canvas
- Dimensions: 127 cm × 101.5 cm (50 in × 40.0 in)
- Location: Chatsworth House; Derbyshire Dales

Portrait of Georgiana, Duchess of Devonshire is an oil on canvas portrait painting by the English artist Thomas Gainsborough, from 1785-1787. It is a depiction of the political hostess Georgiana Cavendish, Duchess of Devonshire.

== Background ==
During her years in the public eye, Georgiana Cavendish, Duchess of Devonshire was painted several times by both Thomas Gainsborough and Joshua Reynolds. Gainsborough's painting of her from around 1785, in a large black hat (a style which she made fashionable, and came to be known as the 'Gainsborough' or 'portrait' hat), has become famous for its history.

After having been lost from Chatsworth House for many years, it was discovered in the 1830s in the home of an elderly schoolmistress, who had cut it down somewhat in order to fit it over her fireplace. In 1841 she sold it to a picture dealer for £56, and he later gave it to a friend, the art collector Wynne Ellis. When Ellis died, the painting went for sale at Christie's, in London, in 1876, where it was bought by the Bond Street art dealer William Agnew for the then astronomical sum of 10,000 guineas, at the time the highest price ever paid for a painting at auction. Three weeks later it was stolen from the London gallery of Thomas Agnew & Sons, a theft that was highly publicised at the time, and for years the newspapers printed stories about claimed sightings of the painting.

However, not until 25 years later did it become known that the thief had been the notorious "Napoleon of Crime", Adam Worth. He had intended to sell it to come up with the bail to release his brother from prison, but when his brother was freed without bail, he decided to keep it for himself, for "a rainy day", and brought it to his adopted homeland, the United States. In early 1901, through the American detective agency Pinkerton's, he negotiated a return of the painting to Agnew's son for $25,000. The portrait and payment were exchanged in Chicago in March 1901, and a couple of months later the painting arrived in London and was put up for sale. The Wall Street financier J. P. Morgan immediately travelled to England to obtain the painting and later claimed to have paid $150,000 for it.

The painting remained in Morgan's family until 1994, when it was put up for sale at Sotheby's and was purchased by the 11th Duke of Devonshire for the Chatsworth House collection for $408,870. After more than 200 years, the painting returned to Chatsworth.

== See also ==
- List of heists in the United Kingdom
