= Knightsbridge Security Deposit robbery =

Robbery

The Knightsbridge Security Deposit robbery took place on 12 July 1987 in Cheval Place, Knightsbridge, England, part of the City of Westminster in London. This robbery, the Banco Central burglary at Fortaleza, and the $900 million stolen from the Central Bank of Iraq in 2003 are said to be the largest bank robberies in history.

The robbery was led by Valerio Viccei (1955–2000), a lawyer's son who arrived in London in 1986 from his native Italy, where he was wanted for 50 armed robberies. Once in London, he quickly resumed his robbery career to fund his playboy lifestyle. On this occasion he secured inside help, obtaining the help of the managing director of the centre, Parvez Latif, a cocaine user, who was heavily in debt.

On the day of the robbery, two men entered the Knightsbridge Safe Deposit Centre and requested to rent a safe deposit box. After being shown into the vault, they drew handguns and subdued the manager and security guards. The thieves then hung a sign on the street-level door explaining that the Safe Deposit Centre was temporarily closed, whilst letting in further accomplices. They broke open many of the safe deposit boxes and left with a hoard estimated to be worth £60 million (equivalent to roughly US$98 million at the 1987 exchange rate).

One hour after the robbers departed, the shift changed and the new staff discovered the crime and alerted the police. Police forensic investigators recovered a bloody fingerprint that was traced to Valerio Viccei. After a period of surveillance, several of his accomplices were arrested during a series of coordinated raids on 12 August 1987 and later were convicted of the crime. Viccei, however, fled to Latin America for some time. Later, when he returned to England to retrieve and ship his Ferrari Testarossa to Latin America, police arrested him.

Viccei was sentenced to 22 years, serving his sentence in Parkhurst Prison on the Isle of Wight. There he forged a friendship with Dick Leach, a Flying Squad officer who led his arrest. They regularly wrote letters to each other, referring to themselves as Fred (Leach) and Garfield or The Wolf (Viccei).

In 1992, he was deported to Italy to serve the rest of his sentence. He was incarcerated in an open jail in Pescara, where he was allowed to live a lifestyle he was already accustomed to, as well as running a translation company.

On 19 April 2000, during day release from prison, a gunfight broke out between Viccei, an accomplice, and the police, resulting in Viccei's death. Two autobiographies of Viccei's life have been published, titled Too Fast to Live (1992) and Live by the Gun, Die by the Gun (published posthumously in 2004).

== See also ==
- List of bank robbers and robberies
- List of heists in the United Kingdom
