= View of Auvers-sur-Oise =

1887 Cézanne painting stolen in 2000

- Paysage d'Auvers-sur-Oise; Groupe de maisons, paysage d'île de France; Auvers: Vue générale du village (French), Ansicht von Aix, Bei Auvers, Regenlandschaft (German)
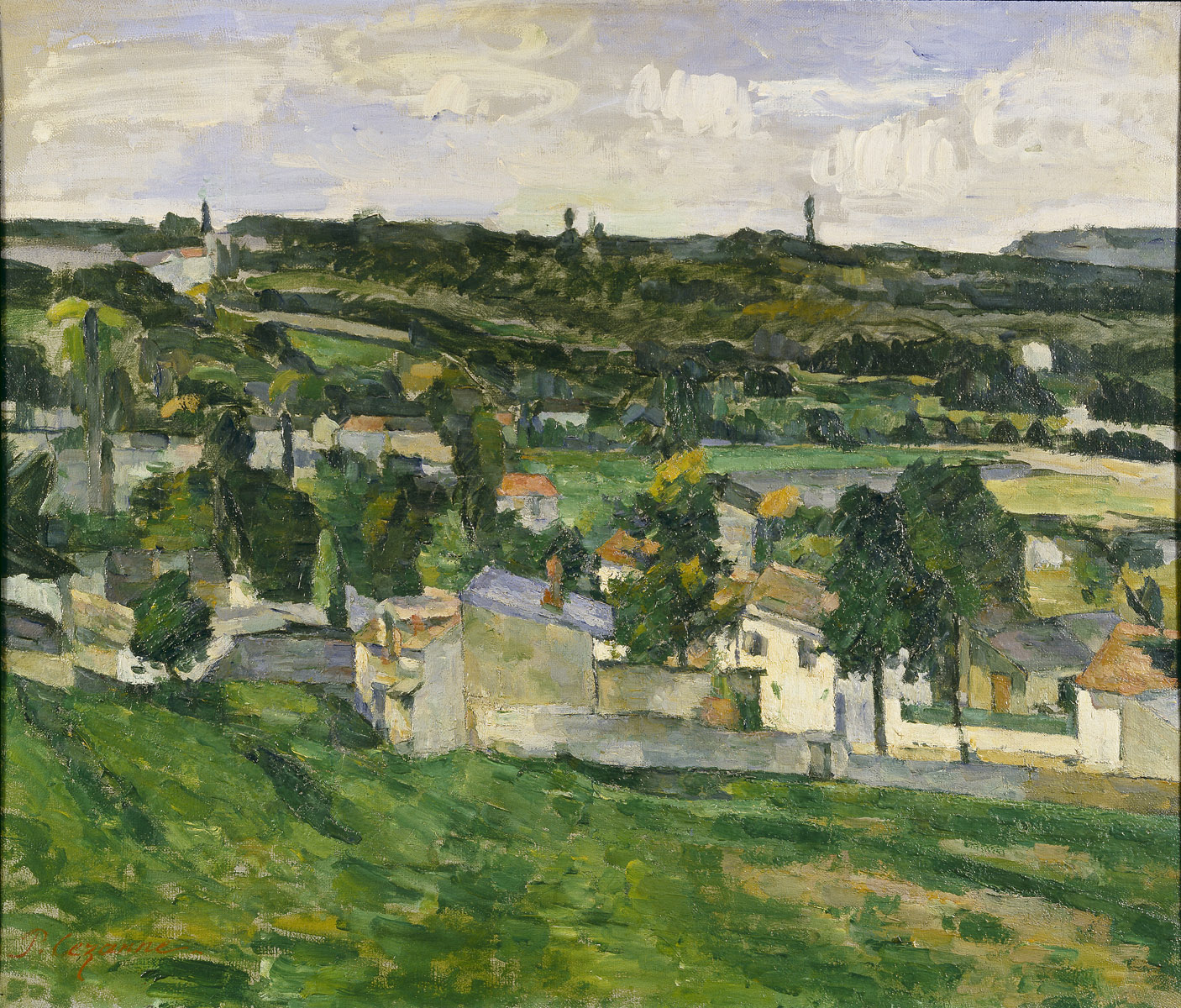
- Artist: Paul Cézanne
- Year: 1879–80
- Catalogue: FWN 134
- Medium: Oil on canvas
- Movement: Post-Impressionism
- Subject: Landscape
- Dimensions: 46 cm × 55 cm (18.1 in × 21.6 in)
- Condition: Stolen in 2000; current whereabouts unknown
- Location: Last known location before theft: Ashmolean Museum, Oxford
- Owner: Government of the United Kingdom
- Accession: WA1980.79
- Preceded by: Paysage avec route et clocher (Île de France près de Melun?)
- Followed by: Paysage

View of Auvers-sur-Oise is the common English name for a Paul Cézanne painting known by various French names, usually Paysage d'Auvers-sur-Oise, or in the artist's catalogue raisonné, Groupe de maisons, paysage d'île de France ('Group of houses, landscape of the Île-de-France'). It is believed to have been painted in 1879–80, several years after Cézanne's residence in Auvers-sur-Oise, a small village northwest of Paris. The painting depicts a landscape of Northern France; the exact location has not been determined.

Victor Chocquet bought the painting from the artist, and it remained in his family's collection until the early 20th century. Later it came into the possession of Bruno Cassirer, who loaned it to the Kunsthaus Zürich. It was inherited by Cassirer's daughter Sophie, and after her death in 1979 it was accepted in lieu of inheritance tax and allocated to the Ashmolean Museum at Oxford University.

Shortly after midnight on New Year's Day 2000, guards at the Ashmolean, responding to a fire alarm, discovered the painting was missing. Police believe the thief or thieves used a smoke bomb and that night's millennium celebrations as a cover for the theft of the museum's only Cézanne and the only painting taken. It has not been recovered.

== Description ==
The oil-on-canvas painting depicts a rolling landscape below a blue sky filled with clouds, represented as smears of paint. Down a green slope from the viewer are a group of houses, white with roofs either blue or orange, again not depicted in detail. Scattered among them are trees, most green, but some with more yellowish color apparent. In the background another hillside with houses amid trees rises; a church spire rises at the crest.

The location of the landscape depicted in the painting is unknown. The painting is 46 centimetres (18 in) high by 55 centimetres (22 in) wide. (Note: The Ashmolean's catalogue page gives its dimensions as 45 by 54 centimetres (18 in × 21 in)) Cézanne's signature is in red paint at the lower left.

== History ==
Camille Pissarro, whom Cézanne came to see as both friend and mentor, moved to Pontoise, a small country town northwest of Paris, in 1872 after his previous country residence in Louveciennes, west of Paris, was stripped of all its contents while he was in Paris during the Franco-Prussian War two years earlier. The following year, Cézanne moved to neighboring Auvers-sur-Oise, where he and Pissarro lived within walking distance of each other, and often painted side by side in plein air. They painted the same subjects, but in different and distinctive works.

The two were trying to capture the "perception of sensation" in their work. Cézanne's style, especially in his landscapes, reflected the influence of his fellow artist, even as the two preferred different techniques—Pissarro dabbing while Cézanne daubed or smeared, according to a local resident who watched them both paint. Cézanne began using brighter colors than he had previously, with less stark contrasts.

A catalogue to a 2006 joint exhibition of their work from this period at the Musée d'Orsay in Paris calls the two Impressionism's "painters of the earth", counterparts to its two "painters of water", Claude Monet and Alfred Sisley. But "with Cézanne the spectator is openly invited to observe the way he portrays surfaces" the catalog observes. "Shapes are simplified and each brushstroke is amplified. His paintings are intense reflections of his method."

View of Auvers-sur-Oise was painted later, in 1879–80. By this time, Cézanne was preparing to leave Paris and return to his native Aix-en-Provence, where he continued painting in this style, including similar landscapes, moving toward Post-Impressionism. Ashmolean Museum director Christopher Brown describes the painting as important to understanding the artist's career, showing him transitioning from his early work to the mature style he brought to well-known later works.

=== Provenance ===
French bureaucrat Victor Chocquet, a collector and advocate for Impressionism, bought the painting. After his death in 1891, it was bequeathed to his wife Marie. In 1899 the Chocquet collection was exhibited at Galerie Georges Petit in Paris, under the title Auvers. In turn it was purchased by another collector of Impressionist works, Thadée Natanson.

Natanson auctioned his collection, including View of Auvers-sur-oise, at the Hôtel Drouot in 1908. It passed that way to another prominent collector, German publisher Bruno Cassirer. He loaned it to his cousin Paul for a 1921 Berlin exhibit of Cézanne works in private German collections; it was titled Ansicht an Aix. Bruno made the painting part of an extended loan to the Kunsthaus Zürich, which exhibited it in 1933 as Regenlandschaft. On another loan to a Swiss museum, the Kunsthalle Basel. This time it was known as Bei Auvers.

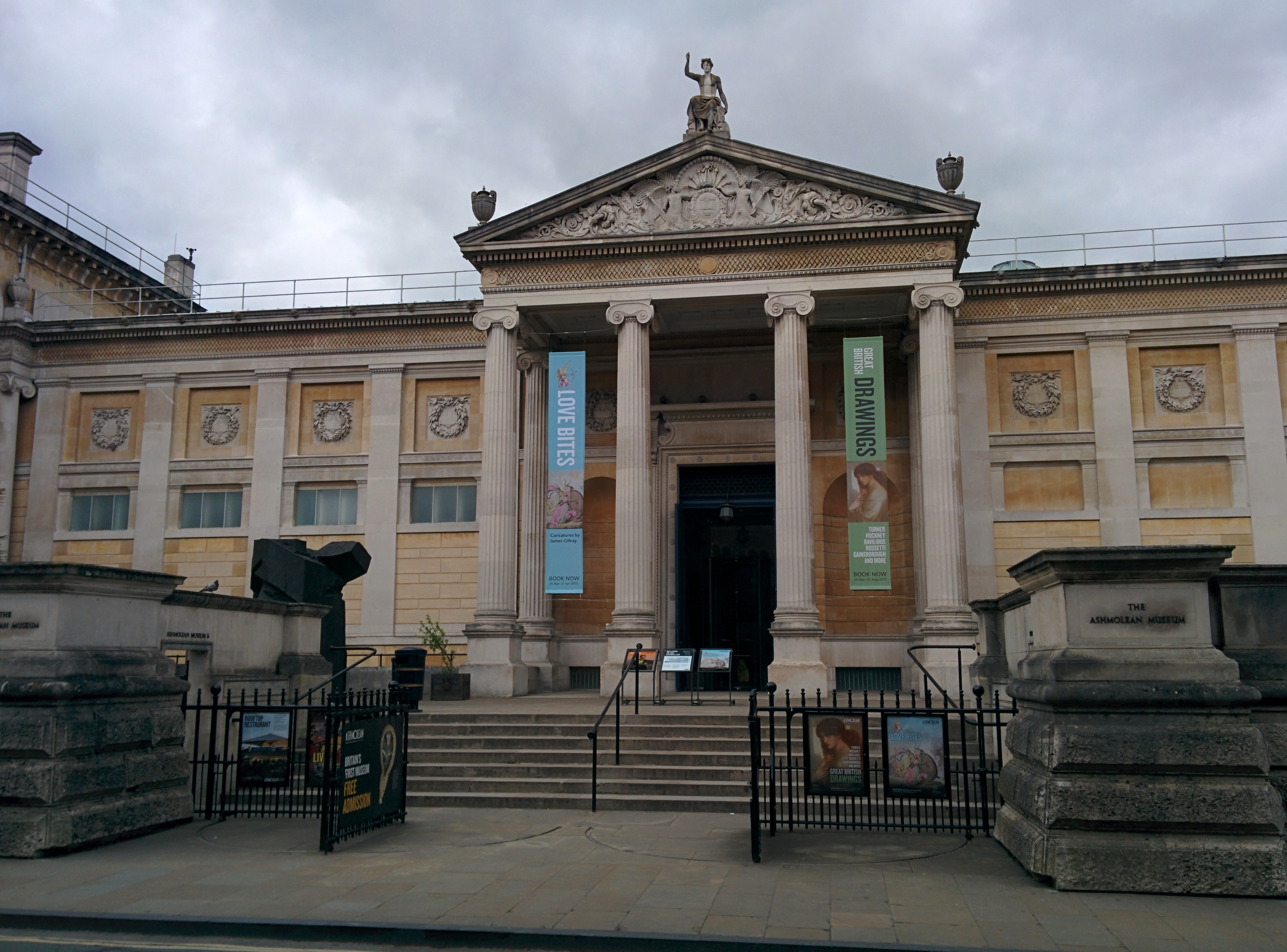
The Ashmolean Museum

Bruno's daughter Sophie inherited it after his death in 1941, by which time the family had moved to Oxford following Nazi persecution. She kept it in the family's hands and did not loan it out. Upon the deaths of her husband Richard Rudolf Walzer in 1975, followed by her own four years later, the estate incurred a large inheritance tax bill. The painting was accepted by the British government in lieu of inheritance tax to become part of the collection at the Ashmolean, which lists it in its catalogue under the English title A View of buildings in a valley in the Ile-de-France. In 1998 the Ashmolean loaned it to the Art Gallery of New South Wales, in Sydney, for its Classic Cézanne exhibit; in this it was given the French title Groupe de maisons, paysage d'île de France, the title used in the artist's current catalogue raisonné.

== Theft ==
At midnight on 31 December 1999, fireworks went off in Oxford as part of the global millennium celebrations that year. Police believe that at that time, someone used the distraction and noise to prevent anyone from noticing that they were climbing scaffolding around an extension to the museum's library that was under construction. Once they reached the roof, they broke a skylight over the museum's Hindley Smith Gallery and dropped a small smoke bomb in.

The burglar carried with them a small holdall holding a scalpel, tape, gloves and portable fan. They dropped a rope ladder into the gallery and descended. Once there they used the fan to blow the smoke around so neither the museum's security guards, should they come into the gallery, nor its CCTV cameras would be able to get a good view of their faces. After cutting View of Auvers-sur-Oise from its frame, they smashed the empty frame on the floor, climbed the rope ladder, went back down the scaffolding and out into the crowds still celebrating the new year and millennium.

Alarms had been set off during the burglary, but security at the museum assumed from the smoke that there had been a fire. When police and firefighters reached the museum at 1:43am, they went into the Smith Gallery and found the smoke had dissipated, with no signs of a fire. Instead what was left of the smoke bomb was on the floor, and a flashing light on the wall alerted them to the absence of the Cézanne painting next to it.

Director Brown, in London for the millennium celebrations, was alerted within the hour. He went immediately back to Oxford and saw the crime scene for himself. "It was like coming into your own house and finding evidence of a break-in," he said. "Any director builds up an intense relationship with the works of art that he or she is responsible for, and this was very personal to me."

Police soon determined that View of Auvers-sur-Oise was the only work taken from a room that also displayed paintings by Renoir, Rodin and Toulouse-Lautrec. This led them to theorise that the burglary had specifically targeted the painting, the only work by Cézanne in the Ashmolean. The thief or whoever they were working for had wanted it for a personal private collection. They may also have been motivated by the £18.2 million sale at Sotheby's of a Cézanne still life, Bouilloire et fruits, itself recently recovered following a theft in 1978, and hoped to make a similar profit. Katrina Burrows, editor of the London-based magazine Trace, which covers stolen art, doubted the thieves or anyone working for them would be able to sell the painting, if that was their goal, due to the considerable publicity surrounding the theft.

The Ashmolean valued the painting at £3 million. Like other artwork in British museums, it was not insured due to the high premiums required. Burrows also said that contrary to public perception of art theft as prevalent due to the recent box office success of The Thomas Crown Affair, it had actually become much rarer due to increased security and awareness of which works might have been stolen. "Anyone offered this painting will walk over to the shelf and look it up in a Cezanne book, and would see where it belongs", Brown said.

There had been other thefts and attempted thefts of art from the museum and other Oxford facilities in the late 1990s. A pair of 17th-century French bottles were taken in 1996, and the following year three thieves were caught after they broke open a glass display case to take a jewel made for Alfred the Great. Brown said the museum had not relaxed its security for the holiday.

The theft also drew comparisons to another recent film, Entrapment, in which the characters use the millennium celebrations as cover for an art theft. Investigators said the thief demonstrated a high level of skill. "It was a very clever ploy, a very professional theft", an unnamed police source told The Guardian. "Whoever has taken this painting has given some thought to how to steal it" agreed Oxford police superintendent John Carr.

Novelist Iain Pears, who lived nearby, said that he could have been a witness. "If I had been there 10 minutes earlier, I could have helped them load it into the car", he joked to The New York Times. He called the theft "jolly brilliant". He believed it was likely that the painting would be recovered. "Twenty years ago the Ashmolean lost a Persian carpet in a theft. They eventually got it back from a dry cleaners in New York."

In January 2014, the Ashmolean made up for the painting's absence by becoming the first European museum to host an exhibit of Impressionist works from the Henry and Rose Pearlman Collection at the Princeton University Art Museum. Of the fifty paintings in Cézanne and the Modern, twenty-four were by the title artist, spanning his whole career. Museum staff recalled the theft as a low point in the museum's recent history that made them more elated to host the Pearlman exhibit.

=== Investigation ===
The Thames Valley Police assigned six officers to investigate. They knew their own resources would not be enough. "This is not a crime which is going to be solved overnight." said a spokesman. "We are more used to run-of-the-mill crimes. We need expertise." Accordingly they had called in specialists in art theft; customs officers at airports and harbours had been alerted in case anyone tried to take the painting out of Britain, although police believed that it was more likely in the possession of some domestic collector.

At first police withheld some details of the crime in case a ransom request came in. Later in January they believed they were on the verge of recovering it after receiving a tip that it had been seen in a West Midlands pub. When they went there to investigate, it turned out to be a copy, its paint still wet, being painted by the landlord.

As of 2021, no other leads have come in that police have discussed publicly; the investigation continues. In 2005 the U.S. Federal Bureau of Investigation (FBI) named the theft one the world's top ten art crimes; its Art Crime Team actively seeks information from the public that may lead to the recovery of View of Auvers-sur-Oise.

== See also ==
- 1880 in art
- List of paintings by Paul Cézanne
- List of stolen paintings
- The Boy in the Red Vest, another Cézanne painting stolen (but later recovered)
