= The Bolney Torso =

British murder victim

Bolney Torso
- Born: c. 1950s Southern Germany?
- Died: early October 1991 (aged 30–45); England
- Body discovered: 11 October 1991
- Burial place: Western Road Cemetery, Haywards Heath
- Known for: Mysterious death and unknown identity

The Bolney Torso is the name given to the partial remains of an unknown male decedent that were discovered in woods near Bolney, Southern England, in October 1991.

== Discovery of the body ==
On Friday 11 October 1991, Colin Oliver, then 62, discovered the torso in woods off Broxmead Lane in Bolney, Sussex. Oliver was walking home to Burgess Hill from Cuckfield along Broxfield Lane. He stopped along the lane and went through a gate leading to a field. He went into the trees to urinate and found a bloody torso rolled up in a piece of carpet in undergrowth. Oliver then walked to the Burgess Hill police station to alert the police to his discovery. He said that he had been so disturbed by the discovery that he had trouble sleeping for several months afterwards.

=== Initial description of the victim ===
The remains were found to be of a male who was believed to have been in his 60s at the time of death. The head and hands of the victim had been removed and the severed head and limbs were never found. One arm had been severed 6 inches (15 cm) below the elbow and the other 2 inches (5 cm) below the elbow; this appeared to have been done in order to remove an identifying tattoo. The arms and head appeared to have been removed with an axe or bolt cropper.

The victim was described as white, had a protruding belly, was circumcised and had a small star-shaped mole on his right thigh.

The victim was wearing turned up trousers from Fosters and a blue shirt with a distinctive motif on the pocket.

== Investigation ==
The investigation to find the identity of the victim and the murderer was assigned the name Operation A23, employing 60 people and costing £150,000. DCI Peter Kennett led the initial inquiry. Detectives searched files of over 100 missing men without finding a match and appeals for the public to come forward with an identity were fruitless.

=== Suspects ===
In December 1991, police were contacted by a local estate agent with a potential lead; a large rented house in Copyhold Lane, Cuckfield, 1.5 miles (2.4 km) from the deposition location of the body, had been abandoned which raised their suspicions. Police investigated the property and found a copy of Penthouse magazine containing an article about dismembering bodies with numbers scrawled on the pages.

Gunter Josef Knieper, from Dresden, Germany, and Kornelia Maria Teusel first rented the property in September 1991 paying £10,000 (6 months rent) in advance. The couple abandoned the property some time around 9 October 1991. Knieper, who had been using the pseudonym Dr Matthias Herrman, was being sought in Germany and Ireland on suspicion of business fraud.

In June 1992, Knieper was arrested in Spain. Police interviewed Knieper in Frankfurt and established that the gang intended to start a fraud operation, but Knieper denied any involvement in the murder of the victim. In August 1992, police admitted there was no evidence to link Knieper to the murder. In January 1994, police returned to Germany to interview another unnamed male who had visited the property in Copyhold Lane.

=== Burial ===
On 2 August 1994, after a brief service, the remains of the victim were laid to rest at Western Road Cemetery, in Haywards Heath. The coffin bore the name "Unknown Male" Eight people attended a funeral paid for by Mid Sussex District Council. The mourners in attendance were representatives of the police, coroner's office and Mid Sussex District Council.

=== Subsequent events ===
In December 1995, a few days before Christmas, some flowers and a note were left at the victim's grave. The note bore the message: "For the unknown male, Peter and team, remember our loss."

== Re-investigation ==
In March 2009, police exhumed the body in the hope that advances in forensic techniques would provide additional information. On 12 November 2009, the case appeared on the BBC programme Crimewatch.

In 2010 it was reported that, following media appeals on Crimewatch UK and its German equivalent, numerous suggestions for the victim's identity had been received; however, none bore fruit. Police stated that three missing persons had been discounted as the identity of the victim and their families had been informed.

In 2011, it was revealed that evidence gathered in 2010 indicated that the victim had been dressed post mortem and that the clothes did not belong to the victim. The re-investigation examined a femur, rib bone and toenail from the victim. This revealed that the victim likely came from southern Germany or a surrounding country. Analysis of the toenail suggested that the victim spent the last year of his life in the UK or the French/German border.

=== Revised description of the victim ===
The revised description of the victim was that his height was between 5 ft 6 in (1.68 m) and 5 ft 8 in (1.73 m) tall, aged between 30 and 45 and most likely in his late 30s at the time of death. The victim had a strongly built upper body. Analysis of the skeleton indicated that the victim was strong, well-nourished and healthy at the time of his death and had no signs of any degenerative illness.

== See also ==
- List of unsolved murders in the United Kingdom
