= Alec Eist =

Notable Scotland Yard detective

- Born: Alexander Anthony Eist; 26 March 1929; Cardiff
- Died: January 27, 1982 (aged 52); Six Mile Bottom, Cambs.
- Other names: TH (allegedly)
- Known for: Law enforcement; Service decoration; Assassination of Martin Luther King; Police corruption

Alexander Anthony Eist (known as Alec) BEM (26 March 1929 – 27 January 1982) was a detective at Scotland Yard during the 1960s and 1970s. He is particularly notable for the many allegations of corruption made against him. These included complicity in jewel robberies and providing false alibis to criminals. He later provided testimony to the United States House Select Committee on Assassinations regarding the assassination of Martin Luther King, whose killer—James Earl Ray—had been in his custody following Ray's escape to London in 1968.

Eist served in the Merchant Navy during the Second World War, for which he received two campaign awards. As a policeman, he was awarded the British Empire Medal for bravery in 1968, following his disarming of a man with a rifle. Despite the allegations of corruption that followed him for much of his career—and resulted in his being returned to uniform police duties before retirement and then facing a failed prosecution after it—Eist was never convicted of any such crimes. Throughout his career, Eist was awarded several decorations for conduct and bravery. Following his retirement, he ran the 'Green Man' pub in Six Mile Bottom, Cambridgeshire.

== Early life and career ==
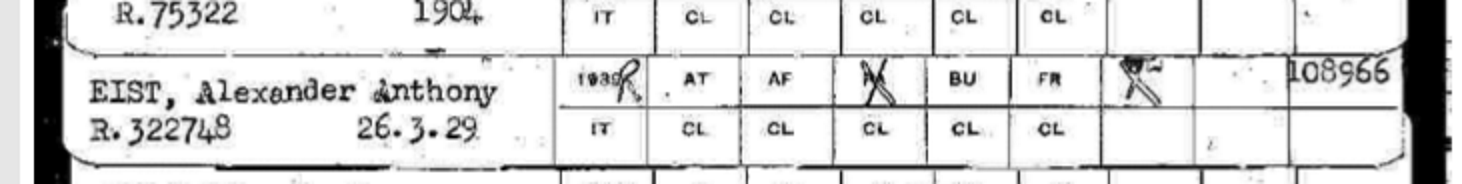
Medal record of Alec Eist from the Merchant Navy database, Board of Trade (Note: Nine types of medals could be claimed by British merchant seamen; they were awarded, or not, following review. Eist's record shows his having applied for and been awarded those with the codes "PA" (Pacific Star) and "WM" (the War Medal, also known as the War Medal 1939–1945). In the document, the letter "R" indicates that an application for the medal was rejected, while an "X" shows it was granted.)

Alec Eist was born in Cardiff on 26 September 1929. He joined the Merchant Navy as an Able Seaman around the time the Second World War was ending in Europe in May 1945. Eist applied for three medals following his tours of duty: the 1939-1945 Star, the Pacific Star and the War Medal. Of these, only the latter two were granted. Having served for nearly three years, Eist joined the Metropolitan Police as a constable in June 1948. He has been described as "a florid, handsome black-haired" man when young.

=== British Empire Medal ===
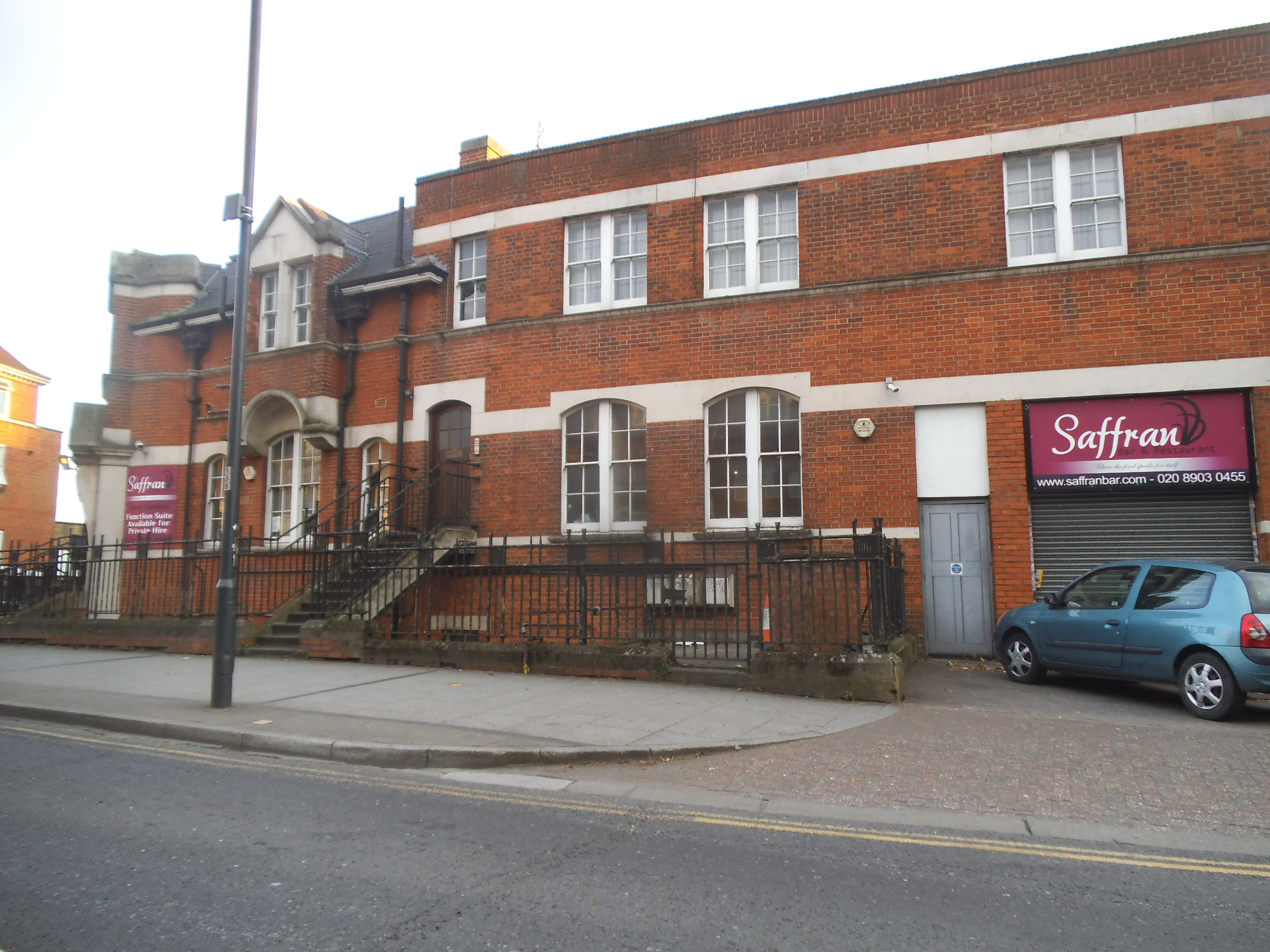
The old Wembley police station, now converted into a restaurant, seen in 2017

In 1967, Eist, then a sergeant based in Cheshunt, was awarded the British Empire Medal for bravery in single-handedly disarming an armed suspect. On 14 February that year, The London Gazette reported that following a series of reported robberies, the suspect's car was spotted, with Eist being one of a number of officers called in to provide backup. A man with a rifle was observed in the property's basement, subsequently escaping into the back garden, where he proceeded to sit on a wall and threaten to shoot the officers if they approached.

Eist recognised the man as an escaped prisoner who, according to the Gazette, was known for being criminal. The man jumped into an adjacent garden, continuing to threaten the policemen, who in return threw flowerpots at him. Cornered at the end of the garden, the man pointed his rifle at each of the officers and threatened to fire if they approached; despite this, both Eist and a colleague tackled the man and disarmed him. The rifle was found to be loaded with three .22-calibre bullets with a fourth in the breech.

== Flying Squad ==
In May 1968 Eist joined the Flying Squad (Note: The Flying Squad (also known as the Robbery Squad and nicknamed The Sweeney, from the Cockney rhyming slang "Sweeney Todd") is a branch of the Serious and Organised Crime Command within London's Metropolitan Police Service.) under Harold "Tanky" Challenor (Note: Challenor had joined the squad three months prior to Eist. According to author Lee Sturley, Challenor – who was later arrested for corruption, found incompetent to stand trial and subsequently got a job with his defence solicitors – "was definitely bent".) and was swiftly promoted to detective sergeant (second class). Eist eventually reached the rank of Detective Chief Inspector. He was appointed—with Chief Superintendent James Marshall—head of the Wembley Robbery Squad, where they encountered Bertie Smalls, head of the Wembley Mob. Eist had an in-depth and extensive knowledge and understanding of both London's underworld and the geography it occupied. The gangster Freddie Foreman described Eist as a "rebel cop", who would get drunk and stand on pub tables singing. The police historian Dick Kirby describes Eist as "always controversial", as was his relationship with senior officers. In an anecdote from Eist's tenure at Holloway:

On one occasion Eist was summoned before a senior officer to be upbraided for something he had done, or perhaps neglected to do. Far from apologising, Eist went on the offensive, pointing out the number of stolen lorry-loads he had recovered. "Alec", replied the other wearily, "before you came we didn't have any fucking stolen lorry-loads!"

=== Involvement in the investigation into the assassination of Martin Luther King ===
There isn't any doubt from the conversation that he told me, that he has admitted to me, that he had done the murder...For what it is worth, I haven't any doubt in my mind that he did that on his own. For whatever reason he did it...he did it on his own. If it had been anything, or anybody behind him on that particular job...during the various and many conversations I had with him, it would have come out.

— Eist's testimony to the HSCA, August 1978

In May 1968, following his assassination of Martin Luther King, James Earl Ray fled to London. On 8 June Ray was arrested at London Heathrow Airport attempting to leave for Brussels on a false Canadian passport. Ray was placed in the personal custody of Eist, first being held at Canon Row Police Station and then in Wandsworth Prison. Eist spent the first nine hours of Ray's custody with him in Canon Row, and whenever Ray was taken to the Old Bailey, they were handcuffed together. Eist later recalled how, "initially, [Ray] didn't want to say anything to anybody", merely glaring at Eist. Eist thought that, probably because of their constant contact, Ray "began to look on me as somebody he could talk to". Eist helped Ray acclimatise to the British prison service, for example, by arranging for him to receive cutlery—which had initially been withheld in his custody for fear of suicide—and bringing him magazines. Ray's later biographer, Gerald Posner, believes that, on account of these niceties, "slowly the two developed a rapport, rare for Ray with anyone". Eist later recalled that, even so, Ray would not respond to specific questions, preferring to talk in generalities. When Eist told Ray that the death of King had made little impact in Britain, Ray's response, said Eist, was "you haven't seen anything yet".

Throughout Ray's subsequent extradition, trial and sentencing, US authorities were unaware of Eist's involvement with Ray. Eist had discussed it with various colleagues and companions over the years, but it was not until 1976 he met a USAF officer then resident in London; Eist mentioned his association with Ray, and the officer advised him to contact the FBI. By then, there was a new investigation into the association planned by Congress.

==== Testimony to the HSCA ====
Two years after his retirement, Eist testified under oath to the United States House Select Committee on Assassinations (HSCA) on 9 November 1976 – its first day of public evidence – that Ray had mentioned disposing of a gun on account of how Ray "had seen a policeman or police vehicle and thrown the gun away". According to Posner, Eist's testimony "caught Ray and his then-attorney Mark Lane by surprise". The journalist Pat McMichael has speculated that because Eist and/or his evidence were unknown and unsuspected in America, his evidence was "particularly damaging". The Observer wrote at the time that Eist's evidence was the "biggest blow" to Ray. Eist testified as to Ray's blatant racism: not only did Ray refer to African-Americans with ethnic slurs, Eist said, but "he also told me that he tried to get into Africa at some stage – he said to kill more of them". Eist also reported that, while in British custody, Ray "seemed quite elated" – "brimming with confidence" – particularly as he believed he would receive payouts for television and media appearances.

Then-chief crime reporter for the Daily Mail, Owen Summers, provided a character witness for Eist at the HSCA, in which he told the committee that he had known Eist personally for over 18 years and had "never been knowingly misled by Alec Eist and always found his information totally reliable". One of the House Committee members, Chris Dodd, however, said he was "extremely disturbed" that Eist had not come forward with his evidence regarding Ray when the HSCA re-opened its investigations in 1977. Eist's answer – "in clipped tones" – was that he had been entangled in domestic affairs, namely his recent trial for corruption.

Summers also disputed Dodd's charge that Eist had remained silent regarding Ray. Eist, stated Summers, had told him 10 years previously, saying that he remembered Eist telling him that Ray had "coughed" to Dr King's killing. In Eist's defence, argued Summers, he had not submitted it as he believed that his paper would not consider it newsworthy. (Note: This was because, at the time, English law did not allow the publication of a defendant's confession until his trial had begun.) Eist claimed that he had taken the advice of his American contact in Britain and reported it to the FBI's London station; however, the House Committee noted that it had failed to discover any records of Eist's report.

=== Informants and accusations of corruption ===
Eist made liberal use of informants within the criminal community. Among his informers, he counted men such as Roy Garner, who was later convicted of smuggling cocaine, and became both a supergrass (Note: "Supergrass" is a British slang term for an informant who turns King's evidence, often in return for protection and immunity from prosecution. In the British criminal world, police informants have been called "grasses" since the late 1930s, and the "super" prefix was coined by journalists in the early 1970s to describe those who witnessed against fellow criminals in a series of high-profile mass trials at the time.) and a millionaire. Eist tried to avoid making appearances in court wherever possible but would ensure that reward payments always included his informant's 10%. He often attended to it personally, although Kirby describes it as "questionable if the fee in its entirety was handed over to the snout". However, his reluctance to attend court was viewed dimly by several colleagues. Morton reports an ex-Flying Squad officer as telling him that Eist:

Was no scriptwriter. He hadn't the intelligence, nor would he go to court on a job. He had no bottle. The only time he went he had a bad time ... Instead he'd get a job, stick it up [to his colleagues] and make sure he wasn't there.

Eist has been described as either "the most corrupt or the best informed" Scotland Yard detective of his generation, argues the investigative journalist Martin Fido, noting how Eist "reputedly offered a sliding tariff of payments". (Note: The "sliding scale" metaphor was later brought to public attention when City of London Police Chief Inspector Philip Cuthbert's taped words were played in a corruption trial. Cuthbert was heard to say, The rules used to be, if you were an Inspector or Chief Inspector you went through the fucking sliding scale, the same as it used to be at the Yard. Don't pretend: it used to go to the top of the fucking tree, up to Assistant Commissioners.) These payments would be in return for him dropping or otherwise failing investigations (although drawing the line, says Fido, at murder and rape cases). Journalist Paul Lashmar has described Eist as "by reputation the most corrupt Yard officer of the 1950s to mid-1970s which was no small achievement in such a packed field". Writer James Morton interviewed a Detetective Sergeant who told him that, notwithstanding that he had a second-to-none knowledge of the criminal scene and its players, Eist would have been unable to "get information without going some way towards them. There is no villain in London who will not give you information if you go about it the right way". (Note: Morton notes that this was in no way exclusive to Eist. During the Kray Twins investigation, for example, it emerged that one of the officers involved was running an informer, who sold LSD and had hired a contract killer. Inspector Read, in charge of the case, discovered that the LSD dealer had been a police informant for two years. Likewise, one of Tony Lundy's informers ended his career doing a 16 stretch but allegedly having received £300,000 before his arrest.) A former colleague of Eist's described Eist's strategy being to effectively self-fund his informers, stating that "if he got £200 from a villain for giving him bail, Eist would give £195 to cultivate an informant".

Likewise, crime journalist Duncan Campbell suggests that Eist was "one of the most active bent officers" of the period. Kirby also suggests that "Eist's probity was also questionable", and describes occasions on which individuals were arrested for crimes that his informers had committed. Reg Dudley – a North London "career criminal" who was wrongfully convicted of double murder in 1977 – was a fence during the 1960s and had, he wrote, a "close relationship" with Eist, whom he calls "bent". Dudley asserts that "for a few grand channelled through [Dudley], Alec would do what he could to make evidence 'disappear'". Kirby asserts that Eist was close enough to Dudley and other villains of the day to socialise with. He notes a contemporary of Eist's at Holloway saying that an "obvious...surveillance photo" existed of various London gangsters on a cruise ship, where "skulking in the shadows one could see the unmistakable features of Alec Eist". Eist has also been alleged to have had links to the perpetrators of the Baker Street robbery, obstructed some of the prosecutions, and later been paid off with jewellery from the robbery's proceeds.

Eist commenced his testimony before the HSCA in late 1978 regarding his custody of James Earl Ray a decade previously

Accusations of corruption also bogged down Eist's appearance before the HSCA. His evidence was questioned by Ray's defence attorney Mark Lane. Lane told the committee that Eist had been "dismissed in disgrace" from Scotland Yard, and cited charges of corruption, perjury and robbery: "if you knew of this man's background, you have done a disservice to the American people by raising the charges" he argued, and considered that accepting Eist's evidence at face value amounted to "perhaps the most outrageous thing this committee has ever done".

After the hearing, Lane told journalists that, although he only knew what he did from a British lawyer to whom he had spoken on the phone, the lawyer believed Eist "was possibly the most corrupt man in the modern history of Scotland Yard". Eist rejected Lane's assertions, describing them as "absolutely untrue". Contemporaneous news reports describe the House Committee as being divided on whether to accept Eist's evidence.

So far as I am concerned I cannot understand how a so-called qualified lawyer could come out with such a statement without at least checking the facts. Even in American law there must be some recourse to action. What he said is absolutely untrue and I am suffering because of it.

— Alec Eist, 19 August 1978, The Washington Post

Eist said, "I live in a very small village and this is crucifying me". He suggested that Lane's allegations were a defence strategy to shift culpability for King's assassination onto the FBI, who, Eist said, "could not have acted more honourably to get that man brought to justice" and that "absolutely no way" had they been involved.

However, although Lane accused Eist of having stood trial for bribery and having been suspected of involvement in jewel robberies across England, Eist was only ever charged on one count involving a false alibi and perverting the course of justice. This charge had been dropped as the name of the arresting officer had been mistaken as Eist, and the judge – instructing the jury to bring in a verdict of not guilty – said "I have come to the conclusion that there is no evidence to link him with any of the counts in which his name appears". He was released immediately and the British government paid for his defence.

== Later life ==
In 1971, Eist headed one of the four teams investigating the Baker Street robbery, in which a gang tunnelled from a West End restaurant in the vault of a Lloyds Bank. A large amount—estimated to be between £150,000 and nearly £4 million (or £1,814,000 to £48,383,000 in 2021)—was stolen, including cash and jewellery. Eist's command was to deal with "outside inquiries". This was a position in which he could utilise his main asset, his contacts in the London underworld, which by then were "unrivalled" in the force. Eist's team, through intelligence, got the investigation its first leads. In 2021, two Daily Mirror investigative journalists, Tom Pettifor and Nick Sommerland, alleged that Eist took a cut of the takings "in exchange for protecting the gang".

One of Eist's last high-profile successes came in January 1975 when he was commended for "outstanding diligence and detective ability leading to the arrest and conviction of an active and violent gang of robbers". On this occasion, he was also commended at the Old Bailey and by the Director of Public Prosecutions.

The arrival of Ernie Millen as Chief Superintendent of the Flying Squad led to procedural and philosophical changes: no longer could officers arrest stooges in place of their own informants, and the practice of arresting criminals in the act but letting ones' informants at the scene escape was also quashed. This was a new practice that, Kirby argues, must have caused "considerable unease" to officers such as Eist. The author Gordon Bowers describes Eist as being "under a cloud" over alleged corruption in the last years of his career, for which he was investigated by Detective Chief Inspector Alan Rattray, although no charges were brought. (Note: Rattray himself was investigated in 1983 for corruption and subsequently demoted.)

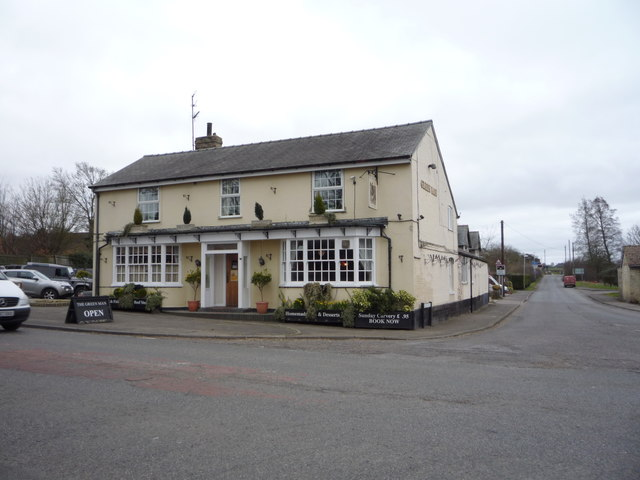
The Green Man public house, Six Mile Bottom, as seen in 2016

Eist was returned to uniformed police duties in 1976, with responsibility for monitoring traffic wardens. Officers involved in Operation Countryman – the investigation into corruption within the Metropolitan Police instigated by Sir Robert Mark in 1978 – believed Eist to have received jewels from the Baker Street robbery, among others. In 1980 one of those arrested for the crime and an associate of Brian Reader, Mickey Gervaise, named Eist as an accessory to it. Gervaise also alleged that he had bribed Eist following the A12 silver bullion robbery which Gervaise had orchestrated and taken part in on 24 March 1980.

With Dudley now arrested and facing a murder trial, Eist was placed on 90-days' sick leave. Eist retired on 26 February 1976 on medical grounds. Kirby describes his mental health as being, by then, "fragile". At some point, he appears to have opened a Haberdasher. Morton quotes an anonymous source as saying that, following his retirement, his property career "did no good. He was always having fires and burglaries—it was an embarrassment." Finally, he opened a pub, the Green Man, in Six Mile Bottom, Cambridgeshire, where he died on 27 Jan 1982. (Note: Following Eist's death, Michael Gervaise—by then a supergrass with his trial approaching—was advised by Detective Chief Superintendent, that it was lucky for Dixon that Eist had died, said Gervaise later, "so I wouldn't have to worry about him".)

=== Decorations ===
Over the course of Eist's 28-year career, he was awarded somewhere between 13 and 28 commendations, (Note: "A commendation for each of his 28 years of police service which [Eist] says is 'way above average'", reported The Washington Post.) one of which was for his work on the Baker Street case. In 2002, three of Eist's medals – the BEM, his War Medal and the Canadian Police Exemplary Service Medal – were auctioned in London. Estimated at between £300 and £400, they sold for £1200, (now £2129).

=== Posthumous allegations ===
Allegations of corruption continued to emerge after Eist's death. In a May 1982 investigation by The Observer, the paper cited the 1970s gangster Joe Cannon as having "significant evidence" against Eist, who Cannon also accused of personally robbing him of £200 in cash. Freddie Foreman later suggested that Eist "used to invite villains to his promotion parties" in hotels such as the Dorchester, where Eist would warn the attendees of any approaching police attention that he was aware of, Foreman claimed. Criminals involved in such high-profile raids as the 1980 silver bullion heist also made allegations against Eist. One, Michael Gervaise, made the "startling allegation" to a court in 1982 Eist was one of several high-ranking police officers bribed and who had "actively participated in robberies as part of [Gervais'] gang". Freddie Foreman, recalling how Eist persuaded Foreman and his gang against carrying out an armed robbery, said in his view Eist could

Make a right pest of himself when he was drunk. But he was as much a crook as any of us and quite capable of doing anything. It was much easier to hold your hand out for a few bob than to have a shoot-out, and he was a pragmatist. He had his ear to the ground and knew who was who on the London scene. Often he worked undercover and posed as a crook. He was a right rascal, but you could live with him. At the same time, he also nicked a lot of people. He’d nick you as quick as look at you if it was safe to do so. But he was very good with us. If anyone was in trouble he’d work a bit of bail and try and help us in court.

Conversely, Pettifor and Sommerland cite one of their sources as arguing that "Eist was a complete scoundrel but in those days you wouldn’t last in the CID if you wasn’t crooked, they had no straight runners around there". They also reported that on one occasion Eist auctioned proceeds from the 1975 robbery of the Bank of America, Mayfair, in the basement of Paddington Green Police Station.
