= Mickey Green =

English criminal (1942–2020)

- Born: 1942; Harrow Weald, Middlesex, England
- Disappeared: 2002
- Died: 13 July 2020 (aged 77–78)
- Occupation: Gangster
- Known for: Irish drug dealer

Mickey Green (1942 – 13 July 2020) was an English gangster and drug lord who had also held Irish nationality. A convicted armed robber he had allegedly been one of Britain's leading drug dealers for many years and was said to be worth at least £75 million. His surname is often spelled in newspapers as Greene.

== Background ==
Green was born in 1942 in Holloway, London.

Green was the leader of the "Wembley Mob" which specialized in armed robbery in the 1970s. For a number of years he has been wanted by police in several countries around the world for suspected drug smuggling. Gangland sources have described him as a main suspect in the murders of London criminal figures Gilbert Wynter and Solly Nahome. His ability to evade arrest has led to him being nicknamed the pimpernel. He is said to have first become involved with drugs during the early 1980s shortly after his release from prison, for armed robbery. He was suspected of having a number of detectives on his payroll and of being an associate of the Adams brothers.

Although owning pubs and other property in Wembley, West Hampstead, Dublin and Marbella, he had been evading authorities for more than twenty years, operating in countries including Morocco, France and the United States where he cooperated with organized crime figures running cocaine in from Colombia until his arrest by the Federal Bureau of Investigation while residing in a Beverly Hills mansion formerly owned by musician Rod Stewart. He was later released without facing a trial.

== Disappearance ==
In 1998, following the arrest of British drug trafficker Michael Michael during Operation Draft, Green was one of sixty others implicated in a £150 million cocaine trafficking ring and would later be arrested by police at the Ritz hotel in Barcelona, Spain. Although held in custody for several months, he was again released and returned to his villa on the southern coast of Spain. As of 2002, he was wanted by authorities in Ireland as they suspected he tampered with a jury at a prior inquest and his assets in the Republic of Ireland were seized by the Irish Criminal Assets Bureau. As of November 2007 he was understood to be living in and around the Marbella area, but had not yet been captured.

It was reported that Green died on 13 July 2020, of skin cancer, while living on the Costa Del Sol.
