= Bertie Smalls =

British criminal and supergrass

- Born: Derek Creighton Smalls; 1935; Bampton, England
- Died: 31 January 2008 (aged 72–73); Croydon, United Kingdom

Derek Creighton "Bertie" Smalls (12 June 1935 – 31 January 2008) was considered by many as Britain's first supergrass. Although there have been informers throughout history – the Kray twins were partly convicted two years before Smalls on evidence given by Leslie Payne – the Smalls case was significant for three reasons: the first informer to give the police volume names of his associates and provide the evidence that would send dozens of them to prison to serve long sentences; the first criminal informer to strike a written deal with the Director of Public Prosecutions; the only criminal informer to serve no time for his crime in return for providing Queen's evidence.

== Background ==
In 1972, Sir Robert Mark became Commissioner of the Metropolitan Police. That year, the annual total of armed robberies in the Metropolitan district was 380 – partly because the culture was rife with bribe-taking, sharing in the proceeds of crime and "verballing", or fabricating evidence against suspects. Sir Robert felt compelled to remind his detectives which side of the law they were supposed to be on, he told them in his inaugural address: "A good police force is one that catches more criminals than it employs."

At the centre of Sir Robert's focus was Criminal Investigation Department, and its pinnacle the Flying Squad – Ken Drury, commander of the Flying Squad and one of his inspectors, Alistair Ingram, later went to prison for corruption.

Sir Robert pushed such investigation – of names such as Mehmet Arif, George Davis, Ronnie Knight, Freddie Foreman, Micky McAvoy – out to the suburban regions, who needed to employ new tactics to catch the bigger criminals they were now faced with.

== Bertie Smalls ==
Derek Creighton "Bertie" Smalls was born in the East End of London and was a career criminal.

=== Barclays ===
On 9 February 1970 Smalls led a team of robbers from The Wembley Mob, including Mickey Green, on an insider-led raid on a branch of Barclays Bank at 144 High Road, Ilford. The gang got away with £237,736 – a record at the time.

Most of the team left England via various routes – Smalls via ferry from Newhaven to Dieppe, train to Paris and then flight to Torremolinos – for the Costa del Sol, where they read the English newspapers for updates on the police search for them.

After making an early breakthrough where an informant provided the names of every member of the gang, the police case cooled until the robbers slowly returned to Britain. Smalls was caught in a suburb of Northampton and spent Christmas in police custody in London.

=== Informant ===
On 2 January, Smalls asked for a meeting with the lead Inspector. In the conversation, Smalls (having been informed by his solicitor that he would be serving at least 25 years if convicted) offered the police a deal to name and incriminate those involved not only in the Barclays Bank job but in every piece of criminal activity he had ever been involved with or known of.

An agreement was drawn up between Smalls and the Director of Public Prosecutions, Sir Norman Skelhorn, that gave Smalls immunity from prosecution in exchange for his help. Jack Slipper was involved in his debriefing and subsequent handling.

On 11 February 1974 the trial commenced at the Old Bailey, Court No.2 of the Wembley Mob in relation to the Barclays Bank robbery. Smalls duly gave evidence and assisted the authorities. As he concluded his evidence against some of his former friends in one of the committal hearings, they sang to him the Vera Lynn song: We'll meet again, don't know where, don't know when...

On 20 May the trial finished, with the jury returning guilty verdicts on all participants on 22 May. In total the judge handed out sentences totalling 106 years, with Green alone jailed for 18 years.

In the following 14 months, Smalls's evidence convicted a further 21 associates for a total of 308 years. Smalls also later ensured the release of Jimmy Saunders, jailed by DCI Bert Wickstead for his part in the 1970 Ilford robbery, after a statement in which he said Saunders was not part of the gang.

== After Smalls's confession ==
In the aftermath and reflection of the Smalls deal, the Law Lords told the Director of Public Prosecutions that they found the arrangement with Smalls an "unholy deal."

Later supergrasses, such as Maurice O'Mahoney, in 1974 then one of Britain's most violent armed robbers, who turned in more than 150 names in exchange for a much-reduced sentence, couldn't escape prison if they had committed serious crimes. O'Mahoney faced a minimum of 20 years but was sentenced eventually to 5 years.

The supergrass system was taken to its pinnacle by a Metropolitan Police officer named the "supergrass master", running the system from Finchley – DCI Tony Lundy. From 1977, Lundy often had four trials per week running but met his match in Michael "Skinny" Gervaise, the leader of 24 March 1980 silver bullion robbery – then the largest in the UK. The team got away with 321 ingots of silver valued at £3.4 million, being transferred from Samuel Montagu & Co. Bank to Germany. After interviewing Gervaise the team were led on 4 June 1980 to a stack of 309 silver ingots. Gervaise later alleged that Lundy was close to Lennie Gibson (the pair were members of the same boxing club), who had supplied police uniforms for the raid via Lundy. Lundy was returned to the reformed Flying Squad and after a two-year investigation fully cleared.

In its conclusion to the Lundy report, the Police Authority concluded Lundy's team had got too close to the criminals. Evidence came for this from the statistics for armed robbery in the Metropolitan area. In 1972, the annual total of armed robberies in the Metropolitan district was 380 – the year after Smalls, it had reduced to 168. By 1978, it had risen to 734 and by 1982 it had more than doubled, to 1,772 – a 366 per cent increase in a decade. The Flying Squad was revived to centralise specialist robbery squads and to improve technical surveillance and the provision of police tactical firearms units.

As part of his deal with the police, Smalls received a new identity. Within a few years of the trial he had returned to his old haunts in north London, drinking openly in the pubs around Hornsey and often boasting he was paid £25 a week by Scotland Yard for his betrayal. He died in January 2008 at his home in Croydon, south London. Bobby King, one of the robbers his evidence convicted and who was later held up as an example of the positive side of prison, once saw him in Crouch End but said he saw it as a test of his rehabilitation that he didn't whack Smalls.

In 1988 DCSI Tony Lundy retired aged 49 to the Costa del Sol for a quiet retirement; where one of his neighbours was Mickey Green – by then Britain's most wanted criminal and biggest drug dealer. In 2005 the UK Government passed the Serious Organised Crime Act, which includes a "tariff" for informants. Even today, people who grass about minor things are said to be "doing a Bertie Smalls".

== Death ==
On 31 January 2008 Bertie Smalls died at the age of 72 of natural causes.
