= Kenneth Noye =

English criminal (born 1947)

- Born: Kenneth James Noye; 24 May 1947 (age 79); Bexleyheath, Kent, England, UK
- Occupation: Criminal
- Spouse: Brenda Tremain
- Children: 2

Kenneth James Noye (born 24 May 1947) is an English criminal and convicted murderer. He was acquitted in 1985 of the murder of a police officer in the grounds of his home, but was convicted in 1986 of conspiracy to handle stolen goods from the Brink's-Mat robbery and sentenced to fourteen years' imprisonment, of which he served eight years in custody. In 1996, while on licence, Noye murdered Stephen Cameron during a road rage incident. He was arrested for the murder in Spain after a two-year manhunt and sentenced to life imprisonment. Noye was later released on licence from the murder sentence in 2019.

== Early life ==
Kenneth Noye was born in Bexleyheath, Kent (now in Greater London), where his father ran a post office and his mother a dog racing track. A bully while a pupil at Bexleyheath Boys' Secondary Modern School, Noye ran a protection racket with his fellow pupils. He left school at age 15. For selling stolen bicycles after having altered their appearance, among other crimes, he spent a year in a borstal. Noye met a barrister's legal secretary, Brenda Tremain, who later became his wife.

== Criminal activities ==
A police informant for many years, Noye had established a relationship with corrupt officers by the time he was arrested for receiving stolen goods in 1977. He became a Freemason in January 1980 after being proposed for admission by two police officers, giving his occupation as "builder." The membership of Noye's Lodge, located in Hammersmith, contained a sizeable proportion of officers. Noye's membership ceased in 1987 after he failed to pay his subscriptions for two years in succession. He was subsequently expelled from the Freemasons when it was discovered that he had a criminal record, according to the Grand Secretary of the United Grand Lodge of England.

One of Noye's police contacts persuaded a customs official not to target him, while his tipoffs to the Metropolitan Police's Flying Squad were reportedly a means to prevent competition from rival criminals. Meanwhile, Noye built up a legitimate haulage business to use as cover. Having initially been refused planning permission for a mansion on a plot of land he owned, he was able to gain consent in a subsequent application shortly after his bungalow on the site was destroyed in a fire caused by an electrical fault.

== Brink's-Mat robbery and killing of DC John Fordham ==
Active as a fence, Noye was among those involved in laundering a huge quantity of stolen gold bullion taken during the Brink's-Mat robbery on 26 November 1983. The discovery of the gold had surprised the six-man robbery crew, as they expected to find £3 million in cash; their contacts had no experience of dealing with gold, let alone 6,800 bars worth £26 million in 1983. Mick McAvoy, one of the thieves, had asked Brian Perry to conceal the gold he had received, and it was Perry who brought in Noye and John Palmer, subsequently nicknamed "Goldfinger"; Palmer was acquitted in 1987 of knowingly handling gold from the robbery.

Noye melted down much of the gold he had received, and mixed it with copper coins in an attempt to disguise its origins, although eleven gold bars from the robbery were found hidden at his home. While he was being investigated for his involvement in the crime, Noye fatally stabbed Detective Constable John Fordham, who was involved in the police surveillance of Noye, in the grounds of his home on 26 January 1985.

Acquitted of murder on the grounds of self-defence in December of that year, he was found guilty in July 1986 of conspiracy to handle some of the gold, and of a conspiracy to evade VAT. After his conviction in court, Noye shouted to the jury "I hope you all die of cancer!" Sentenced to fourteen years, and fined £500,000 with £200,000 costs, Noye was released from prison in 1994, having served eight years. In a civil action brought by the loss adjusters of Brink's-Mat's insurers, £3 million was recovered from Noye while he was imprisoned.

== Murder of Stephen Cameron ==
On 19 May 1996, while on release from prison on licence, Noye was involved in a road rage incident with 21-year-old motorist Stephen Cameron on a slip road of the M25 motorway near Swanley in Kent. Noye stabbed Cameron to death with a nine-inch knife. He then fled the country with assistance from Palmer, who later claimed to have barely known Noye. While Noye was on the run, Detective Constable John Donald was jailed for eleven years for passing confidential information to him.

Police initially named Anthony Francis as the man they wanted to question in the Cameron murder. By December 1996, however, this name was found to be a false identity used by Noye after the Land Rover Discovery registered in his name and matching the vehicle driven by Cameron's killer was unloaded in Kyrenia, Cyprus, in July that year. Noye was not found in Cyprus.

A police hunt assisted by GCHQ found Noye in Spain, where he was arrested in the resort of Barbate near Gibraltar on 28 August 1998. Cameron's girlfriend Danielle Cable, who witnessed the killing, was secretly flown out to positively identify him, which she did on 27 August. Noye lost an appeal against his extradition from Spain seven months later. He was extradited to Britain in May 1999, nine months after his arrest, and went on trial 10 months later.

At trial Noye claimed not to be a violent man and again pleaded self-defence, claiming to have fled because the police hated him and he feared not receiving a fair trial. Found guilty on 14 April 2000, after a trial held in conditions of high security, Noye was convicted of murder by the jury's majority verdict of 11–1 after their deliberations had lasted 8 hours and 21 minutes, and was given a life sentence by Lord Justice Latham. The judge did not recommend a tariff in open court on how long Noye should serve, but made the usual written report to the Lord Chief Justice and the Home Secretary recommending a tariff of 16 years. In 2002 Home Secretary David Blunkett set the tariff as recommended, which was subsequently upheld by Mr Justice Simon.

Despite Noye's evident wealth, his defence costs of around £250,000 and some costs for his initial appeal were funded by legal aid. An inquiry by auditors from the Lord Chancellor's department found that the correct legal aid procedures were not followed, as a result of carelessness rather than corrupt practice. One official was reprimanded and another resigned.

Cable was given a new identity under the witness protection programme, having been praised by police for her courage in giving evidence in the presence of Noye and his associates.

== Alan Decabral case ==
Alan Decabral
- Alan Decabral
- Born: 1959 or 1960
- Died: 5 October 2000; Ashford, Kent 51.1585°N 0.8687°E
- Cause of death: Assassination by gunshot
- Occupation: Mechanic

Another eyewitness in the Cameron murder, Alan Decabral, declined protection and was shot dead in his car in front of shoppers through his open window in Ashford, Kent, on 5 October 2000 (some 6 months after Noye's conviction). Police sources were in no doubt that Decabral was killed by a professional hitman. Police sources also stated that Decabral had been questioned about gun smuggling, had extensive criminal contacts, and his estranged wife later admitted that he had been a drug dealer who owed money to others. Although Noye was questioned by the police, they concluded that the unsolved murder had no proven connection with Noye and did not charge him.

Decabral had testified at the trial of Noye at the Old Bailey that he saw the fight between Noye and Cameron on the motorway slip road, and told the jury that he saw Noye "lunging forward" with a knife and stabbing Cameron, testimony that helped convict him. The defence had attempted to discredit Decabral, saying he was an unreliable witness who created an "edifice of lies" in agreement with police.

After Decabral's murder Noye's defence team, led by Michael Mansfield QC, continued to attempt to discredit him as a witness in order to win Noye's release. Before he died, Decabral had received death threats in relation to his involvement in the case against Noye and said that he had been ordered by unknown gangsters to "shut up or we will shut you up." He also said that someone had pushed three bullets through his letterbox with a warning. After the trial he had said "I look over my shoulder every time I go into Sainsbury's" (the murder took place in the car park of Sainsbury's Bybrook Superstore).

Police investigated whether Decabral was killed as part of a fight between rival biker gangs over drugs. Witnesses to the murder in the retail park said they heard Decabral beg for his life before a young man in a woolly hat shot him.

== Prison sentence and later legal proceedings ==
On 10 October 2001 and again in 2004, Noye appealed unsuccessfully against his conviction. He was represented again by Michael Mansfield. In 2007 a legal challenge was made against the Criminal Cases Review Commission's decision not to refer his case to the Court of Appeal as "legally flawed".

On 7 March 2008, on a new legal challenge, Lord Justice Richards and Mrs Justice Swift granted permission for a one-day judicial review hearing, covering the CCRC's October 2006 decision not to send Noye's case back to the Court of Appeal.

On 25 June 2010, Noye's bid to have the minimum term he must serve for murder reduced was rejected. Mr Justice Simon, a High Court judge sitting at Newcastle, ordered that he must spend at least 16 years in jail before he could be considered for parole. On 14 October of that year, Noye was granted a fresh appeal against his conviction for Cameron's murder, but it was rejected on 22 March 2011. Noye was reported to have been moved from the Category A prison, HM Prison Whitemoor, to a Category B prison, at Lowdham Grange, in September 2011. Noye was formerly at Category C HM Prison Wayland in Griston, Norfolk. Another appeal, this time against the tariff, was dismissed on 12 March 2013.

On 13 February 2015, BBC News reported that Noye had been granted a parole hearing. The Parole Board said the case had been referred by the secretary of state. Noye was refused permission to move to an open prison by Justice Secretary Michael Gove in October 2015 after such a move had been recommended by the parole board.

However, in the High Court, Mr Justice Lavender accepted a legal challenge in February 2017 that Gove had "failed to give proper or adequate weight to the recommendation of the Parole Board". Edward Fitzgerald QC, acting for Noye, said during the previous month's hearing that the board had "noted that he had made significant progress in changing his attitudes and tackling his behavioural problems". Counsel for the Justice Secretary, Tom Weisselberg, QC, said Gove had doubted Noye had reformed, and considered there was the risk he would escape because of his connections to Spain. It was announced in August 2017 that Gove's successor David Lidington had agreed Noye should be moved to open prison conditions. It was said by the parole board that this change was not in preparation for Noye's release.

Around March 2018, Noye was moved to HM Prison Standford Hill on the Isle of Sheppey, which is a low security prison with a day release provision for prisoners.

In May 2019, the parole board announced that Noye was "suitable for return to the community" and would be released from prison within about three months.

On 6 June 2019, then aged 72, Noye was released from prison after serving 20 years for the M25 attack. The parole board considered risks associated with his release due to "his readiness to carry and use weapons" and because Noye was "not being able to resolve arguments reasonably at key moments" as he "did not always control extreme emotions well". The board concluded that any perceived risks could be managed in the community and thus he was suitable for release.

== Personal life ==
Noye's wife, Brenda, lives in the east Cornwall town of Looe. They have two sons, one of whom, Brett, was banned in 2013 from being a company director for 12 years for his part in a £2.4 million investor deception scheme involving a rat poison company.

== In media ==
Noye has been portrayed by Nigel Terry, in 2003 ITV drama Danielle Cable: Eyewitness about the murder of Stephen Cameron by Noye in 1996, by Larry Lamb in Fool's Gold: The Story of the Brink's-Mat Robbery, and by Jack Lowden in The Gold, a 2023-2025 BBC drama series about the Brink's-Mat robbery. The Gold: The Inside Story, an accompanying documentary, aired on BBC One a day after the first series final episode in 2023.
