= The Gold (TV series) =

British television series

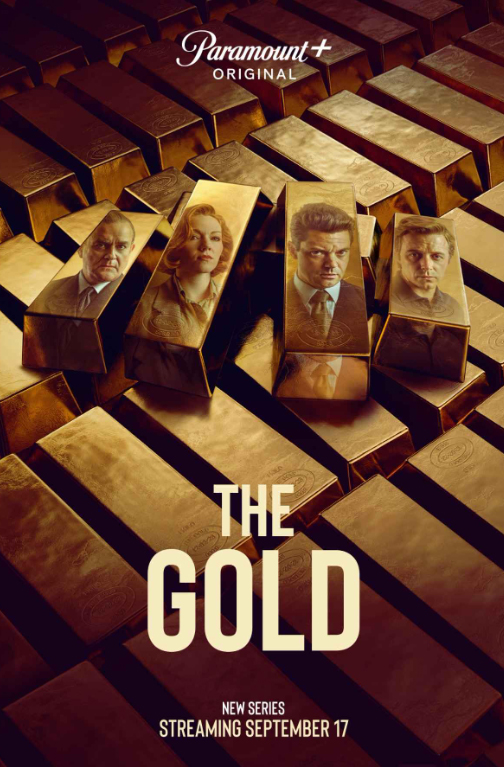
- Genre: Crime drama
- Created by: Neil Forsyth
- Written by: Neil Forsyth
- Directed by: Aneil Karia; Lawrence Gough; Patrick Harkins
- Starring: Hugh Bonneville; Jack Lowden; Emun Elliott; Charlotte Spencer; Tom Cullen; Stefanie Martini; Sean Harris; Adam Nagaitis; Dominic Cooper; Daniel Ings; Sam Spruell; Stephen Campbell Moore; Joshua McGuire; Tom Hughes
- Composer: Simon Goff
- Country of origin: United Kingdom
- Original language: English
- No. of series: 2
- No. of episodes: 12

Production
- Executive producers: Neil Forsyth; Ben Farrell
- Producer: Charlie Leech
- Running time: 58 minutes
- Production companies: VIS (series 1); Tannadice Pictures

Original release
- Network: BBC One; Paramount+ (series 1)
- Release: 12 February 2023 – 8 June 2025

The Gold is a British drama television series written and created by Neil Forsyth and co-produced by his Tannadice Pictures production company. It stars Hugh Bonneville, Dominic Cooper, Charlotte Spencer, Emun Elliott, Sean Harris, Jack Lowden and Tom Cullen and is a dramatisation of events that begin with the Brink's-Mat robbery in 1983. It is directed by Aneil Karia, Lawrence Gough and Patrick Harkins.

== Synopsis ==
The series covers the 1983 Brink's-Mat robbery in which £26 million (equivalent to £88.4 million in 2025) worth of gold bullion, diamonds, and cash was stolen from a warehouse near Heathrow Airport, and the events that followed over the subsequent decade. At the time, it was the biggest robbery in history, and led to a number of international criminal investigations.

== Cast and characters ==
=== Main ===
- Hugh Bonneville as DCS Brian Boyce
- Jack Lowden as Kenneth Noye
- Emun Elliott as DI Tony Brightwell
- Charlotte Spencer as DI Nicki Jennings
- Tom Cullen as John Palmer
- Stefanie Martini as Marnie Palmer
- Sean Harris as Gordon Parry (series 1)
- Adam Nagaitis as Micky McAvoy (series 1)
- Dominic Cooper as Edwyn Cooper (series 1; guest series 2)
- Daniel Ings as Archie Osbourne (series 1)
- Sam Spruell as Charlie Miller (series 2; guest series 1)
- Stephen Campbell Moore as Tony Lundy (series 2)
- Joshua McGuire as Douglas Baxter (series 2)
- Tom Hughes as Logan Campbell (series 2)

=== Recurring ===
- Ruth Bradley as Isabelle Cooper (series 1), Cooper's wife
- Nichola Burley as Brenda Noye (series 1), Noye's wife
- Peter Davison as Assistant Commissioner Gordon Stewart
- Amanda Drew as Commander Cath McLean
- Hadley Fraser as DC John Fordham (series 1)
- Sean Gilder as Deputy Assistant Commissioner Neville Carter (series 1)
- Sophia La Porta as Kathleen Meacock (series 1), McAvoy's lover
- Dorothy Atkinson as Jeannie Savage (series 1), Noye's associate
- Silas Carson as Harry Bowman, police officer
- James Nelson-Joyce as Brian Reader
- Ellora Torchia as Sienna Rose (series 1), Cooper's lover
- Robyn Betteridge as Palmer’s daughter
- Skylar Betteridge as Palmer’s daughter
- Beth Goddard as Shirley (series 2), Palmer's accountant
- Antonia Desplat as Léna (series 2), Palmer's lover
- Joshua Samuels as Jerren (series 2), Palmer's driver
- Sean Teale as Enrique (series 2), Palmer's employee
- Aleksandar Jovanovic as Ivan (series 2), a Russian
- Jack Bandeira as Scott Errico (series 2), a drug trafficker
- Lorna Brown as Lauretta (series 2), the governor of Tortola
- Rochelle Neil as Kadene (series 2), Campbell's girlfriend
- Madalena Alberto as Gabriella Lunez (series 2), an agent of the Drug Enforcement Administration
- Tamsin Topolski as Alice Harper (series 2), a fraud investigator

== Episodes ==
No.	Title	Directed by	Written by	Original release date	Viewers (millions) (Note: 7-day ratings)
1	"To Be a King"	Aneil Karia	Neil Forsyth	12 February 2023	6.23
A gang led by Micky McAvoy successfully steal gold from the Brinks-Mat warehouse at Heathrow. The gang approach gold dealer Kenneth Noye, who subsequently engages lawyer Edwyn Cooper, a fellow Freemason, to help them fence the gold. DCI Boyce takes the investigation out of the hands of the Flying Squad but reluctantly allows DI Nicki Jennings (Charlotte Spencer) and DI Tony Brightwell to join his team.
2	"There's Something Going on in Kent"	Lawrence Gough	Neil Forsyth	19 February 2023	4.97
The police find intelligence via Customs officers that the gang have purchased a portable smelter. They also use Bristol-based gold dealer John Palmer to melt down the gold with cheap jewellery to disguise its purity. Cooper and gang associate Gordon Parry fence the money. Cooper decides to invest it in property, buying a new flat in Chelsea and a wing of his daughter's school.
3	"The Consequences Are Mine"	Aneil Karia	Neil Forsyth	26 February 2023	4.93
Palmer travels to Tenerife on holiday with his family from where it turns out he cannot be extradited. The police arrest Noye at his home after he fatally stabs John Fordham, one of the officers involved in his surveillance.
4	"Vengeance Is Easy, Justice Is Hard"	Aneil Karia	Neil Forsyth	5 March 2023	4.92
After a trial including a jury visit to his home to reconstruct the crime scene, Noye is found not guilty of murder.
5	"The Boy You Were"	Lawrence Gough	Neil Forsyth	12 March 2023	5.07
Boyce travels to Switzerland where he bonds with a Swiss policeman over their wartime experiences in the Spanish Civil War and the Cyprus Emergency respectively. The official allows him to attend a court session which reveals the Swiss bank accounts used by the gang. Following a failed attempt by the Spanish police to arrest Palmer in Tenerife, the UK requests his extradition from Brazil. Cooper returns to Rotherhithe where he is also arrested although Parry escapes in a car.
6	"I'll Be Remembered"	Lawrence Gough	Neil Forsyth	19 March 2023	5.24
Cooper provides information to the police, resulting in the conviction of Noye and the other gang members in relation to the gold theft. McAvoy marries his fiancee in prison and Parry is arrested in Spain. It transpires that the gang only took half of the missing gold.

No.	Title	Directed by	Written by	Original release date	Viewers (millions) (Note: 7-day ratings)
1	"Episode #2.1"	Patrick Harkins	Neil Forsyth	8 June 2025	3.31
Brinks-Mat gold case continues by the police getting interested in it, as gold appears at a certain location.
2	"Episode #2.2"	Patrick Harkins	Neil Forsyth	8 June 2025	2.61
The police investigation spreads overseas.
3	"Episode #2.3"	Patrick Harkins	Neil Forsyth	8 June 2025	2.66
The police investigation spreads globally.
4	"Episode #2.4"	Patrick Harkins	Neil Forsyth	8 June 2025	2.49
Drug Enforcement Administration (DEA) accompanies the police from the United Kingdom in a money laundering case.
5	"Episode #2.5"	Patrick Harkins	Neil Forsyth	8 June 2025	2.88
The police and criminals face each other.
6	"Episode #2.6"	Patrick Harkins	Neil Forsyth	8 June 2025	2.77
Criminals are brought before court.

== Production ==
The series was commissioned by the BBC in August 2021.

The project was announced to have started principal photography in April 2022 with Bonneville, Lowden, Spencer, Cooper and Harris all revealed to be cast and Karia announced as director and Forsyth's Tannadice Pictures producing. Filming took place in the UK and Spain and locations included Dorchester Prison in July 2022.

The show was renewed for a second series in November 2023 with filming scheduled to start in January 2024. Returning cast members include Hugh Bonneville, Charlotte Spencer, Emun Elliott, Tom Cullen, Stefanie Martini and Sam Spruell.

Forsyth confirmed the second series would be the last, explaining that The Gold was always a story he wanted to tell in two parts.

== Broadcast ==
The BBC released the first trailer for the show in on 20 January 2023. The first episode aired in the UK on BBC One on 12 February 2023 with all episodes immediately available on BBC iPlayer in UHD picture quality.

The Gold received very high viewing figures in Britain, particularly through the iPlayer catch up service. The opening episode eventually attracted ten million viewers.

It began streaming on Paramount+ in September 2023. The BBC commissioned a second series in November 2023, which began airing on BBC One on 8 June 2025, with all episodes released on BBC iPlayer the same day.

In the United States, the first series was re-aired on Masterpiece on PBS on 5 October 2025, with the second due to premiere on PBS in October, 2026.

The Gold has been widely broadcast internationally including on – PBS Masterpiece (North America), Rialto (New Zealand), CBC Gem (Canada), MagentaTV (Germany), Stan (Australia), ERR (Estonia) and BBC First (Asia/India).

== Reception ==
Hugo Rifkind of The Times remarked of the series, "it's tremendous. I'm not sure there's been a drama like it in years". In the Sunday Times, Camilla Long said The Gold was "astonishingly, lavishly, well realised", while Esquire said that The Gold was "British TV at its best" and had "all the hallmarks of a crime classic". Radio Times said it was "an intricately crafted crime drama". Euan Franklin of Culture Whisper said The Gold "proves that shows dealing in largely British matters are just as ambitious as prestige American television". The New Statesman called it "outstandingly enjoyable TV", with the Evening Standard calling it "a truly smart British crime drama with a classic feel and a knockout cast". Ellen E. Jones of The Guardian dubbed it an "ever-enjoyable ride". Nick Hilton of The Independent remarked the show was "a lively, creative piece of work from writer-creator Neil Forsyth, which bubbles away with the vigour of a red-hot crucible".

The second series of The Gold received a similarly positive reception. In a five-star review, The Times called the second series, "Every bit as sparkling as the first, if not more so. An exceptional piece of television". The Telegraph said The Gold "retains its sparkle", and "what sets The Gold apart from similar dramas is the effortless grandeur of Neil Forsyth’s writing". The Sunday Times said "the shine hasn’t come off The Gold" and The Herald remarked that Forsyth had "expertly blown the bloody doors off again". The Metro said the second series was "once again brilliant. Perhaps even better", The Guardian called it "top quality British drama" with "thunderingly good performances, including Hugh Bonneville at his best", and the Evening Standard declared The Gold "still a criminally good time".

The Gold has also been well received internationally. The New York Times praised the "marvellous cast" and said that Forsyth was "working on a bigger canvas, presenting a broad mosaic of the British class system and the dead hand of tradition and hierarchy" while the LA Times called it "a patient portrait of cops, robbers, class and greed". In New Zealand, The Post called it "as good as British crime-drama gets" and in Australia the Sydney Morning Herald hailed The Gold as "a masterclass: both engrossing and poignant". The Spanish newspaper El Pais observed "time and time again, The Gold reveals the inescapable imprint of the human factor in every criminal act" while El Periódico compared The Gold to The Sopranos "in how prosaic its antiheroes can be". In France, Le Figaro said The Gold is "a virtuoso and sharp" drama that also served as a "vitriolic portrait of the class system".

There was some criticism (including from investigative journalist Roger Cook, who confronted John Palmer in 1994) of the perceived sympathetic portrayal of Kenneth Noye from the family of the man he murdered and one of the police officers involved in his conviction.

== Accolades ==
The series was nominated for Best Drama Series at the Royal Television Society Programme Awards. In March 2024, the series was nominated in the Best Drama category at the 2024 British Academy Television Awards.

Neil Forsyth was nominated for Best Writer Film and TV at the 2023 Scottish BAFTAS.

For the second series of The Gold, Joshua McGuire was nominated for both an RTS and BAFTA Supporting Actor Award for his performance as Douglas Baxter, while Tom Cullen was nominated for a Broadcasting Press Guild Award for his portrayal of John Palmer. At the RTS Scotland Awards, Neil Forsyth won the Best Writer award for The Gold while Patrick Harkins (Director) and Jack Lowden (Best Actor) were also nominated for their work on the show.

== Book ==
Screenwriter Neil Forsyth co-wrote a book with Thomas Turner entitled The Gold: The real story behind Brink's-Mat: Britain's biggest heist and published by Penguin Random House, which had involved extensive interviews with some of the major characters involved. Forsyth commented on the morality of the story, saying they were not seeking "a black-and-white reading of it. No-one in the show is an out-and-out criminal living in a world dictated by criminality. They've got families and lives". Forsyth gives historical context and says, "Social mobility is an interesting aspect, because it was obviously a theme of the time in the 1980s. I think we examine that...Criminality is a tool which they're trying to use to achieve something".

== See also ==
- The Gold: The Inside Story, a 2023 BBC documentary about the robbery
