= Operation Othona =

Operation Othona was a covert operation, gathering intelligence on corruption within the Metropolitan Police Service, set up in 1993. The work and findings of the operation were kept separate from other intelligence gathered by the Metropolitan Police. Nearly all records from the operation were destroyed in 2001 or 2003.

== See also ==
- Operation Tiberius
