= Elliot Castro =

Scottish Fraudster

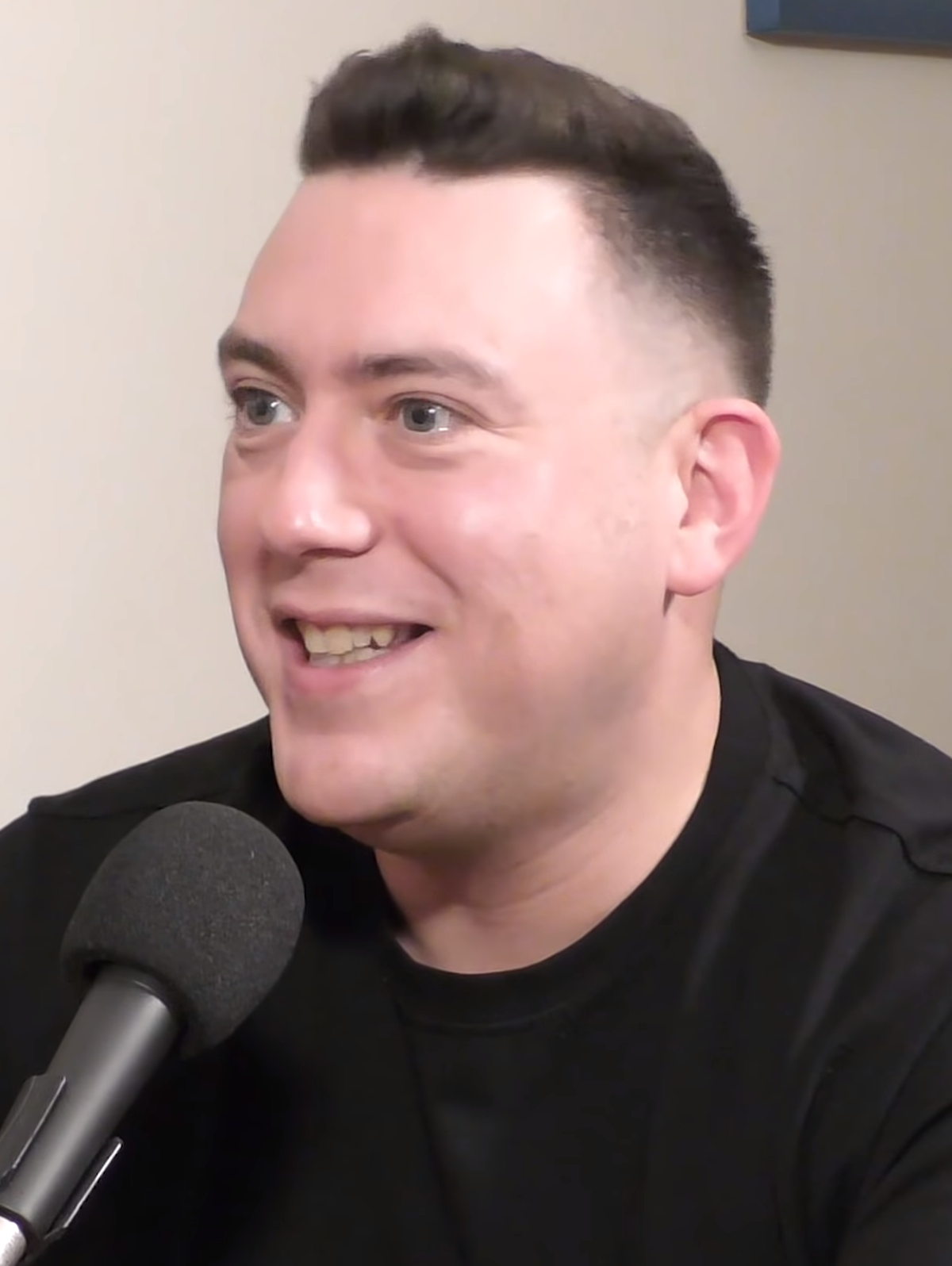
- Castro in 2020
- Born: 1982 (age 43–44); Scotland
- Occupation: Fraud consultant
- Criminal charge: Fraud
- Criminal penalty: 2 years

Elliot Castro (born 1982) is a Scottish ex-fraudster from Glasgow who claims he swindled approximately $2.8 million through various financial crimes when he was a teenager.

== Early life ==
Castro, who is half Chilean, was born in Aberdeen in 1982, and attended eight different schools before moving to Glasgow, with his family in 1998. He has admitted lying on his job application for the mobile phone sales, call centre when he was 16, instead of the claimed 18. He is quoted as saying, "I had it in my head that I would just have this amazing lifestyle."

== Career ==
Castro claims that his first brush with criminality was when he, as a teenager, found a credit card on a train platform and used it for his train fare but was caught when the police boarded the train.

Castro claims that this criminal behaviour was ramped up when at 16 years old he lied about his age on a job application for a mobile phone company, stating he was 18. He was soon hired and began duping personal information from customers combined with information held by the company to defraud customers by tricking their banks to send new bank cards to different addresses where he would receive them and use them for his own gains.

At first, he would buy CDs, haircuts and clothes before realizing the potential of what he could do. He began spending lavishly as his crimes escalated. He purchased cars, a $12,000 Rolex, spent upwards of $15,000 at nightclubs and travelled the world. Castro claims to have travelled to several countries in Europe with the money from his victims. In 2002, he was jailed for 83 days in Toronto, Canada. During his deportation he used the airline ticket details to steal the credit card information of the Canadian Immigration Office and to book a flight to Belfast where his lucrative crime spree continued, while commuting between there and Dublin he engaged in multiple complex cash frauds.

During an impulsive trip to Glasgow with friends, he purchased £2,000 worth of Harvey Nichols Gift vouchers with illicit cash, which led to his arrest within the store. At the age of 22, he was jailed for two years by Isleworth Crown Court and served his term at Ford Open Prison. On his release he has stopped defrauding people and has acted legitimately as a financial fraud prevention consultant for several firms.

Castro’s story was told in a 2007 book by Neil Forsyth called Other People's Money (2007).

His £2.5m 'global crime spree' story has been extensively documented in a BBC series called "Confessions of a Teenage Fraudster" which was released in 2024 and subsequently shared on YouTube.

== See also ==
- Frank Abagnale
