= Paul Stretford =

British football agent

Paul Stretford is an English football agent. In 1987, he founded Proactive Sports Management, renamed Formation Group in 2004, which went on to represent, amongst others, England footballer Wayne Rooney. In 2010, Rooney revealed as part of his evidence during a court case that Stretford received 20% of his off-field earnings, an amount the player regarded as being fair.

Stretford has frequently been embroiled in legal disputes and his methods have been criticised. As part of the same court case in 2010, Stretford admitted that when he first represented the 17-year-old Rooney, he had not explained to the player, or to his father, what documents were being signed or what their effects would be – something the prosecuting barrister called "absolutely extraordinary".

== Career ==
=== Beginnings ===
Stretford's first deal was Frank Stapleton's transfer from the French club Le Havre AC to Blackburn Rovers in 1989.

=== Larger dealings ===
Among the major players Stretford went on to represent were Andy Cole and Stan Collymore. In January 1995, Stretford negotiated Cole's transfer from Newcastle United to Manchester United for a then record British transfer fee of £7million. Stretford's connection with Manchester United had begun in 1994, with his involvement in the £1.2million transfer of David May to the club from Blackburn Rovers. Cole considered the agent a friend and on moving to Manchester had stayed at Stretford's house, later discovering that rent had been deducted from his earnings. "Stretford wasn't motivated by friendships, but money" Cole said in a 2010 article.

A legal case that in January 2011 was moving through the Portuguese courts suggested that for a time Stretford co-operated with the Gestifute agency run by the Portuguese football agent, Jorge Mendes, to bring Portuguese players into British football. According to claims made by Formation in that legal suit, agent's fees were shared between Gestifute and Formation in the deals that brought Hugo Viana to Newcastle United for around €12 million in 2002, Nuno Capucho to Rangers in 2003 and Cristiano Ronaldo from Sporting Clube de Portugal to Manchester United for £12.24 million in the same year. Formation were pursuing Gestifute for what they claimed were unshared fees on subsequent deals.

=== Flotation ===
Proactive Sports Management was floated on the London Stock Exchange in 2001 with a valuation of more than £30 million. The list of the company's shareholders was later described as "a Who's Who of the footballing fraternity", and included the managers and former players Bobby Robson, Kenny Dalglish, Kevin Keegan, Graeme Souness and Peter Reid. In 2008 the company was reported to have 130 employees.

== Wayne Rooney ==
=== Transfer to Manchester United ===
In 2004, Stretford was paid a reported £1.5million as part of the £27million transfer of Wayne Rooney from Everton F.C. to Manchester United. At the time, the amount was understood to be the biggest payment ever received by an English-based agent. Stretford received £1million, with a further £500,000 to follow when Rooney saw out the duration of the contract.

=== Blackmail case and FA charge of misconduct ===
The circumstances under which Rooney came to be represented by Stretford, rather than his original agent, Peter McIntosh, were the subject of an extended dispute. An associate of McIntosh, Dave Lockwood, attempted to get Stretford to pay out a share of his earnings from Rooney's representation, engaging John Hyland, a former Olympic boxer, to help in the attempt. One meeting to settle the issue was attended by Tommy Adams, member of a London family who have been called "worse than the Krays" and a man described once in court as "a notorious gangster". Adams had been invited by Kenny Dalglish, a shareholder in Stretford's Proactive agency, who had advised Rooney's parents to change his representation. At one stage Stretford had £250,000 in cash ready to pay off Hyland, although the money never changed hands.

At a subsequent meeting at a Cheshire Hotel in June 2003, Stretford claimed that he was physically threatened by Hyland and two other men, Christopher and Tony Bacon, who were reportedly Australian cage-fighting champions. That meeting had been secretly videoed by Stretford who went to the police, leading to Hyland and the Bacons being charged with attempted blackmail. When the case came to court in October 2004, however, it collapsed when it was revealed that Stretford had given misleading evidence. Stretford had told the jury that he had not represented Rooney before December 2002, but documents came to light revealing that their association dated to at least September of that year when the player was still contracted to McIntosh's Pro-Form Sports Management Limited. The prosecution barrister said "we do not feel able to rely on Paul Stretford as a witness in this case". Stetford stepped down as a director of Formation.

The case led to the Football Association charging Stretford with misconduct in June 2005, a case he at first attempted to have heard in a public court and then challenged on the ground that the FA's disciplinary procedures did not comply with Article 6 of the European Convention on Human Rights and that one of the FA's rules was an unlawful restraint of trade –claims rejected by the Court of Appeal in March 2007.

In July 2008 the FA found Stretford guilty of seven of the nine counts against him, including making false and/or misleading statements to the police and in court. The commission found that Stretford had "encouraged Mr Rooney and his parents to enter into a representation agreement with Proactive Sports Management Limited on 17 July 2002 although he knew Mr Rooney was still then under contract with Pro-Form Sports Management Limited."

A charge of enticing Rooney away from his previous agent was not proven but the FA also stated that: "The commission found that Mr Stretford had made a misleading witness statement and had given untruthful evidence in court in criminal proceedings in Warrington Crown Court, particularly in relation to the existence, dates and nature of those representation agreements dated 17 July 2002 and 19 September 2002." Stretford maintained that he believed those two contracts were for image rights only and that the pivotal document was signed in error by Proactive's chief executive, Neal Rodford, without Stretford's knowledge.

A further charge of entering into a representation contract with Rooney for eight years was also proved, the limit for written contracts being two years, as were two charges of failing to lodge representation contracts with the FA.

Stretford was fined £300,000 and banned for 18 months, half of which was suspended. He called the verdicts of the disciplinary panel "a travesty", appealing the decision and then taking the case to arbitration before accepting the 9-month ban on 1 May 2009.

=== Sued by Proactive ===
Stretford 'left' Proactive in October 2008, citing "huge and irreconcilable differences" that were believed to centre on his relationship with the firm's board.

Proactive in fact sacked Stretford for "acts of gross misconduct" and sued Stretford in an attempt to recover the £1.6 million it had paid for Stretford's breach of FA regulations. £300,000 of the total was the FA's fine, with £1.3 million in legal costs. In July 2009 Stretford in turn issued a writ to Proactive's Neil Rodford in an effort to make him personally liable for the £1.6 million.

Proactive also claimed it was entitled to £4.3 million from Rooney as the 20% commission payments on the contracts brokered by Stretford while he was at the firm. The judge in the case ruled in part in favour of the footballer, saying that the contract Rooney had signed with Stretford's Formation as a 17-year-old player had amounted to a "restraint of trade", running as it did for eight years, six years longer than recommended by the Football Association but did find in favour of Proactive for its "restitutional remedy" claim element. Proactive were awarded a thus far indeterminate "quantum meruit" payment by Wayne Rooney / his company which is the subject of a further legal hearing. Proactive also won the right to appeal the "restraint of trade" judgement and the courts will hear this appeal in July 2011 whilst Stretford will defend the £1.6m claim Proactive has brought against him later in the year. Proactive was also awarded £90,000 in respect of its full claim against Mrs Rooney / her company (who chose not to attend court and offer any personal defence to the claim brought against her and her company).

=== Contract negotiations ===
During negotiations for a new contract in October 2010, Wayne Rooney announced that he wanted to leave Manchester United, only to agree a new 5-year deal days later. Stretford was criticised for his part in these events, with Manchester United's manager Sir Alex Ferguson later saying that Stretford was "not the most popular man in the world – certainly at our club".

Further background information on Mr Stretford is contained in John Sweeney's book "Rooney's Gold".;

== New agency ==
On leaving Proactive Stretford set up Triple S Sports and Entertainment Group with former Newcastle United owner Freddie Shepherd and his son Kenneth.

Stretford had a lengthy association with Newcastle. He first represented Andy Cole while he was a player at the club, suggested by a second player, Scott Sellars, and Kenneth Shepherd had formerly been employed by Proactive Sports Management, working for Stretford from an office in Newcastle's St James Park. According to Manchester United's chief executive, David Gill, Wayne Rooney's original transfer to Manchester United was provoked by Newcastle's apparent interest in the player.

== Rylands F.C. ==
In 2018 Stretford became owner of Rylands F.C., a football club based in Warrington, England. Paul had played for this club in the 1970s.
