= David Hunt (gangster) =

British gangster

- Born: David Charles Hunt; April 1961 (age 65); Canning Town, London, England
- Other names: Long Fella, Davey Hunt
- Occupation: Suspected organised crime boss

Hunt Crime Organisation
- Founded: 1980s
- Founded by: David Hunt and brothers
- Founding location: Canning Town, London, England
- Years active: 1980s–present
- Territory: Canning Town/Soho/Essex
- Criminal activities: fraud, pimping, money laundering
- Rivals: Various criminal gangs in London

David Charles Hunt (born April 1961) is an English suspected organised crime boss linked to violence, fraud, prostitution, money laundering and murder. He heads a gang dubbed 'The Hunt Syndicate', which has been described as being an extensive criminal empire that has so far evaded significant penetration from law enforcement. Hunt is known in gangland circles as Long Fella due to his height of 6 ft 5 inches. In a confidential police report from the early 2000s which was later leaked online, Hunt's gang was said to include family members and the father of well-known reality TV star Mark Wright.

Hunt has been described by Metropolitan Police sources as being "too big to bring down". He became a close friend and associate of Reggie Kray, visiting him in prison in 2000 just prior to his death. He was the owner of Hunt's Waste Recycling in Dagenham, which was the centre of the "largest fire in several years" in London during the nearby 2012 Olympics closing ceremony, with 40 fire engines and over 200 fire fighters attending the scene. Now known as Connect Waste, the recycling centre is run by Phil Mitchell (Note: Not to be confused with the fictional character Phil Mitchell from Eastenders) who is a long time friend of Hunt's.

== Early life ==
Hunt was born in 1961 in Canning Town to May (née Wicks) and George Hunt, the youngest of 13 children.

== The Hunt Syndicate ==
A police investigation into organised crime groups in north and east London, codenamed Operation Tiberius, included details of the activities of the Hunt Syndicate. The Tiberius report stated that the syndicate had managed to evade prosecution with the help of corrupt police officers and by intimidating witnesses. The crime gang were uncovered by the crime squad in Newham, East London in 2006, when a scrapyard in Canning Town was searched for stolen metal. When another nearby property was raided as part of that operation, 42 containers were unexpectedly discovered to contain the contents of 18 lorry thefts and a commercial burglary. Counterfeit goods were also seized. Dave McKelvey, head of the crime squad, discovered that the gang had been corrupting police officers for over a decade and that despite a gang insider leaking information to the police, the information was never acted upon. Despite overwhelming evidence, the case collapsed after a detective sent a dossier to prosecutors raising concerns about McKelvey, who was then investigated for two years (the investigation was found to be fatally flawed and McKelvey exonerated, with Detective Chief Superintendent Albert Patrick stating that he struggled to understand what McKelvey was being accused of). As a result of the raids, McKelvey was informed, whilst interviewing a petty criminal, that a known contract-killer had been contracted for £1 million to kill three police officers including McKelvey himself, who now lives under round-the-clock police protection.

=== Failed legal action against The Sunday Times ===
In 2013, Hunt unsuccessfully tried to sue The Sunday Times. Three years earlier, the newspaper had called him a violent "underworld king". The judge stated that it was "reasonable to describe the claimant as a violent and dangerous criminal and the head of an organised crime group implicated in murder, drug trafficking and fraud". Hunt was represented by Hugh Tomlinson QC, who is the chairman of the Hacked Off campaign and also a member of the Matrix Chambers group of barristers. Tomlinson portrayed Hunt as a "rough diamond" who "was a misunderstood property tycoon whose only passions in life were his family and racing pigeons", and argued that it was not in the public interest for the newspaper to have revealed how Hunt had been embroiled in a gangland turf war over land the government had been due to buy in the lead-up to the Olympics.

During the trial, The Sunday Times employed five professional bodyguards to protect their witnesses. On the second day of the trial, the bodyguards walked off the job after being approached in a pub; another security firm refused to take on the job due to the notorious reputation of the Hunt Syndicate. As the article had been mainly based on leaked Serious Organised Crime Agency and police documents, the paper had to rely on these as evidence. When the paper approached the Metropolitan Police before publicly disclosing the leaked documents, the Met responded by unsuccessfully trying to sue them for the recovery of those documents and to obtain an order banning their publication. The Met also launched an internal investigation to try and identify the source of the leak. Sunday Times journalist Michael Gillard was named British Journalism Awards Journalist of the Year in 2013 for the exposé, but was unable to attend the award ceremony due to security concerns meaning that he was unable to attend public events in London.

It was revealed in May 2014 that Lloyds Bank had lent Hunt up to £5 million at the time of the case, after a £4.2 million loan from Barclays was called in when staff read media reports of the case. It was also revealed that whilst owing The Sunday Times £805,000 in legal costs, Hunt borrowed £1 million from former pornographer and newspaper owner and current West Ham United F.C. co-chairman David Sullivan. The loan was made from Sullivan's finance firm GC CO NO 102 to Hunt's business Hunt's (UK) Properties. A member of the Treasury Select Committee believed that the Financial Conduct Authority should investigate the loans.

=== Contract on Metropolitan Police officers ===
In 2016, details of a plot to assassinate three police officers who were investigating Hunt were revealed in full detail in an episode of the BBC's Panorama. For a £1 million contract, Hunt had summoned Yardie hitman Carl 'The Dread' Robinson to a boat in Marbella and instructed him to kill the officers. Despite the detectives being tipped off that there was a contract against them, their superiors, instead of investigating this, suspended the three officers and investigated them for corruption. They were later cleared of any wrongdoing.

== Panama Papers ==
Amidst the Panama Papers leak of April 2016, it was revealed by The Guardian that Hunt was a client of Mossack Fonseca and owned an offshore company, EMM Limited, which held ownership of an iron and steel business in East London.
