= Neil Forsyth =

Scottish journalist and writer

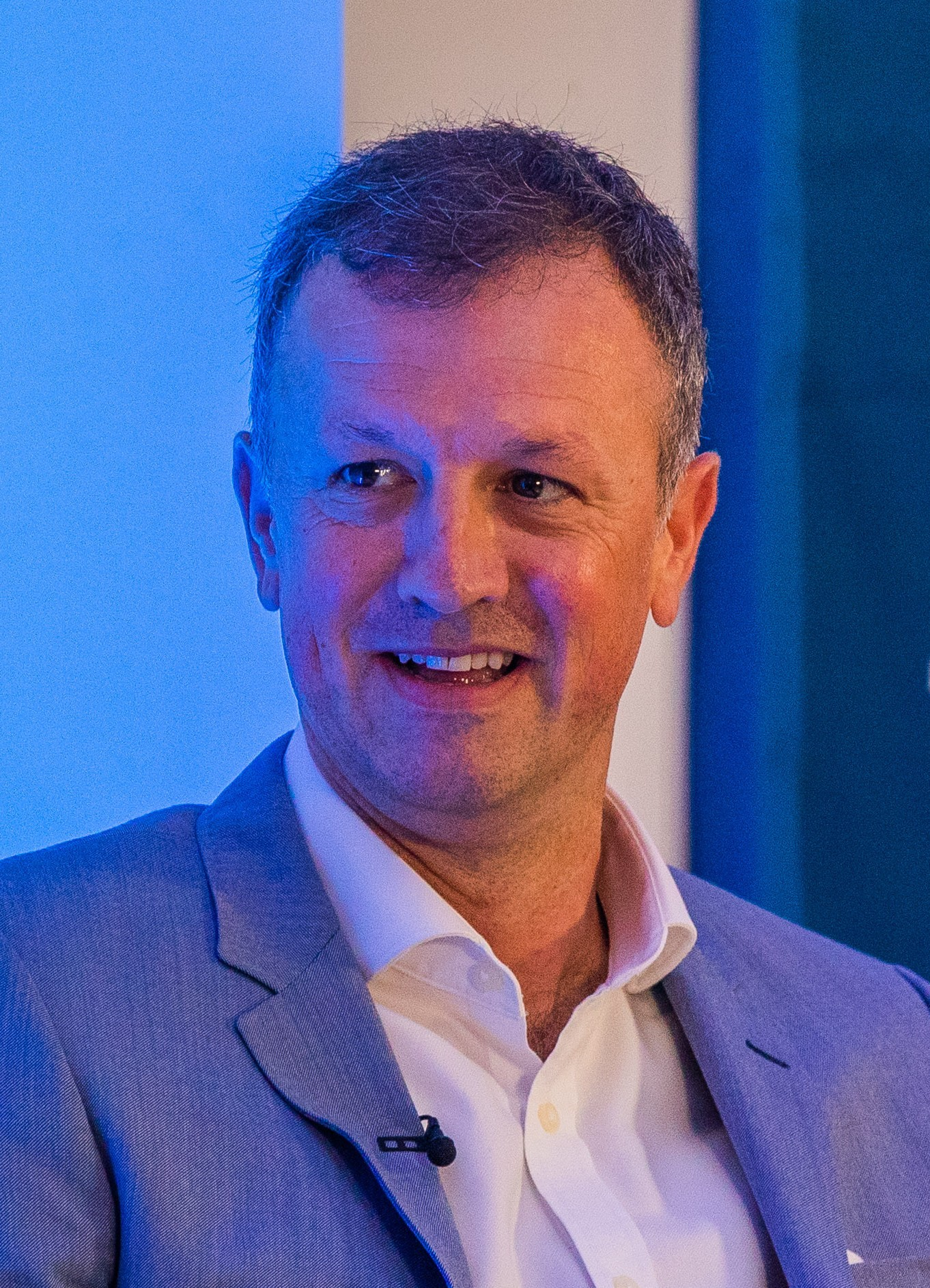
- Forsyth at an event in 2025
- Occupations: Screenwriter, author
- Notable work: Legends; Bob Servant Independent; The Gold; Guilt

Neil Forsyth is a Scottish screenwriter and author. He has written and created a number of television series, including Legends (2026), The Gold (2023), Guilt (2019), and Bob Servant Independent (2013). His production company is Tannadice Pictures. Forsyth has won numerous television awards. He has also written a large number of books, both fiction and non-fiction.

== Early life and education ==
Neil Forsyth grew up in Dundee, Scotland, where he attended the High School of Dundee and his first writing appeared in a Dundee United fanzine.

He graduated from Edinburgh University and held several jobs, including as a nightclub promoter, before working as a freelance journalist. He is also a graduate of the New York Film Academy.

== Books ==
Forsyth's first book, Other People's Money (2007), told the true story of the Scottish fraudster Elliot Castro. It received significant coverage and was well received, although some newspapers questioned the book's moral purpose. "They thought it was wrong that we should profit from Elliot's crimes," Forsyth said, "But that's always something I protested against quite vigorously. Elliot was caught, and sentenced, and paid for his crimes." Several film developments of Other People’s Money were announced, but the book is yet to make it to screen.

Forsyth has written four comic novels featuring the character Bob Servant: Delete This At your Peril (2007), Hero of Dundee (2010), Why Me? (2011), and Ask Bob (2015). In 2009 Irvine Welsh selected the then out of print Delete This at Your Peril as his choice in an Esquire Magazine poll for the Funniest Books Ever. On the book’s reissue, Barry Fantoni wrote "'I have worked with a lot of funny men – Peter Cook, Spike Milligan, Harry Enfield. Bob Servant is in a class of his own". In 2011, The Scotsman said "Bob Servant has attained national treasure status", while the Press and Journal called Bob Servant "a modern Scottish comedy classic." Forsyth has noted the Dundonian poet William McGonagall as an influence for the character, along with Harry Flashman.

After watching a medium perform in Edinburgh, Forsyth wrote the novel Let Them Come Through (2009). Forsyth researched the psychic world by attending live shows and speaking to experts, including James Randi. Let Them Come Through was published in the UK and the US and was praised for its dark humour. The Miami Herald called Let Them Come Through “deliciously malicious…a fierce piece of fiction”.

Forsyth’s 2014 novel San Carlos is set in Ibiza in the 1980s, and is a thriller following a reformed neo-Nazi seeking a new life. San Carlos was Book of the Week in the Daily Mirror, while The Herald said that Forsyth had shown a “different side to his talents” in the "pacy, unpretentious thriller".

In 2023, Forsyth wrote The Gold: The Real Story Behind Brink’s-Mat: Britain’s Biggest Heist, to accompany his television drama The Gold. The book was published by Ebury and co-written with the show’s researcher Thomas Turner.

== TV ==
After a successful Radio 4 series, Forsyth adapted Bob Servant for television in early 2013 in the cult BBC Four comedy Bob Servant Independent (renamed Bob Servant for a second series in 2015).

In 2016, Forsyth wrote four one-off Playhouses for Sky's Urban Myths series. Elizabeth, Michael & Marlon was based on the apocryphal story that on 9/11, Marlon Brando, Elizabeth Taylor and Michael Jackson hired a rental car and drove from New York to Ohio. The Playhouse was shot in late 2015, starring Brian Cox, Stockard Channing and Joseph Fiennes. It also featured Carrie Fisher in one of her final roles. Before the planned 2017 transmission of the show adverse reaction to the casting of Fiennes as Jackson, particularly from Jackson’s daughter Paris Jackson, saw the show controversially pulled by Sky. Forsyth's Sky Playhouse, Waiting for Andre, concerned the real-life friendship between Samuel Beckett and a teenage Andre the Giant and saw Forsyth nominated for a 2018 Writer’s Guild Award in the Best Short Form TV Drama category. The series of Playhouses (Urban Myths) was nominated for an International Emmy.

In 2017, Forsyth wrote Eric, Ernie and Me, a one-off drama about Morecambe and Wise from the point of view of their writer Eddie Braben. It was broadcast on BBC4 on 29 December 2017 to a positive reception. Eric, Ernie and Me was nominated for a number of awards, and Forsyth was nominated for a Royal Television Society Award for his writing of the show.

In 2019, Forsyth wrote and created Guilt, a BBC drama which premiered on the new BBC Scotland channel before being transmitted on BBC2. Guilt ran for three series, won a large number of awards and is widely regarded as one of Scotland’s best ever dramas For his work on Guilt, The Times called Forsyth "a contender for Britain’s best plot weaver” and The Guardian “one of the UK’s most gifted writers”. The New York Times noted "Forsyth's knack for creating characters who work their way into our affections, less by their actions than by their unconscious, soul-deep responses to life".

In 2023, Forsyth created and wrote The Gold, a drama series that was broadcast on BBC One and Paramount+. The show is a dramatization of events around the 1983 Brink's-Mat robbery. It received very high viewing figures and was hailed by many as one of the best British television dramas for years, with The Radio Times noting Forsyth’s “storytelling genius”. The Gold was nominated for Best Drama at the 2024 British Academy Television Awards., and ran for two series.

In May 2026, Forsyth wrote and created the Netflix drama Legends which was produced by Forsyth’s production label Tannadice Pictures, following a team of British Customs officers who go undercover into the drugs world. The series premiered on 7 May 2026 to a positive critical reception. The Sunday Times declared "At last, Britain has a cop show to rival The Wire" while praising Forsyth's "remarkable ability to capture minor characters’ humanity with immense economy and speed". The Herald called Forsyth “Scotland’s finest screenwriter”.

== Film ==
In 2022, a Forsyth script about the life of Samuel Beckett was filmed by James Marsh and starred Gabriel Byrne with the title Dance First.

The Guardian called Dance First, “a small masterpiece”.

== Production label ==
On 5 June 2020, he teamed with Objective Fiction, a label of All3Media-owned Objective Media Group, to create a joint venture television drama production label named Tannadice Pictures, named after the stadium of Dundee United. Tannadice co-produced The Gold and produced Forsyth’s 2026 Netflix drama Legends.

== Other ventures ==
Forsyth was the manager of the Sealand national football team from 2009 until 2013.

As of May 2026 Forsyth is a patron of the Dundee Bairns charity.
