= Legends (2026 TV series) =

British television series

- Release poster
- Genre: Crime thriller
- Created by: Neil Forsyth
- Inspired by: The Betrayer: How An Undercover Unit Infiltrated The Global Drug Trade by: Guy Stanton; Peter Walsh
- Written by: Neil Forsyth
- Directed by: Brady Hood; Julian Holmes
- Starring: Tom Burke; Steve Coogan; Hayley Squires; Aml Ameen
- Music by: Sion Trefor
- Country of origin: United Kingdom
- Original language: English
- No. of series: 1
- No. of episodes: 6

Production
- Executive producers: Neil Forsyth; Ben Farrell; Richard Bradley
- Producer: Charlie Leech
- Production companies: Tannadice; All3Media; Lion Television

Original release
- Network: Netflix
- Release: 7 May 2026 – present

Legends is a British crime thriller television series written and created by Neil Forsyth and produced by his Tannadice Pictures production company. It is a dramatisation of the true story of undercover British customs investigators who infiltrated the drug world in the early 1990s, and the cast includes Tom Burke, Steve Coogan, Hayley Squires, and Aml Ameen. The series premiered on Netflix on 7 May 2026 and received positive reviews from critics and high viewing figures.

In August 2026, the series was renewed for a second season.

== Premise ==
In the early 1990s, Her Majesty's Customs and Excise was losing its battle with drug smuggling across Britain's borders. In a top-secret operation, a small team of customs employees was sent undercover with new identities and told to infiltrate Britain's most dangerous drug gangs.

== Cast and characters ==
- Tom Burke as Guy
- Steve Coogan as Don Clarke
- Hayley Squires as Kate
- Aml Ameen as Bailey
- Jasmine Blackborow as Erin
- Douglas Hodge as Angus Blake
- Charlotte Ritchie as Sophie
- Tom Hughes as Declan Carter
- Johnny Harris as Eddie McKee
- Gerald Kyd as Mylonas
- Numan Acar as Hakan
- Joshua Samuels as Zeki
- Stephen Walters as Jed
- Kem Hassan as Aziz
- Youssef Tounzi as Jawed
- Thomas Coombes as Shaun
- Alex Jennings as the Home Secretary
- Con O'Neill as Arthur Goodwin
- Deepak Verma as Ayub Afridi
- Robbie O'Neill as Danny O'Connell
- Cecily Cleeve as Lily
- Sue Jenkins as Jan

== Production ==
=== Development ===
The six-part series is created and written by Neil Forsyth, and was commissioned by Netflix in August 2024. Forsyth and Ben Farrell are executive producers for All3Media-backed Tannadice Pictures, and Richard Bradley is an executive producer for Lion Television. Directors on the series are Brady Hood and Julian Holmes, the series producer is Charlie Leech, and the story producer is Rhiannon Forsyth. The series is inspired by the 2022 true crime book The Betrayer: How An Undercover Unit Infiltrated the Global Drug Trade, by Guy Stanton and Peter Walsh, as well as extensive research and interviews that Neil Forsyth conducted with Stanton and other former undercover Customs agents. Stanton worked for HM Customs for 23 years, ten of which were spent in an undercover unit set up in 1991 to thwart a large drug smuggling operation. He writes in the prologue of the book that it is all based on actual events, with names and some details changed to protect the identities of the operatives.

On 24 August 2026, the series was renewed for a second season.

=== Casting ===
The cast is led by Steve Coogan, Tom Burke (playing actual undercover Customs agent Guy Stanton) and Hayley Squires, and includes Aml Ameen, Jasmine Blackborow, Charlotte Ritchie, Douglas Hodge, Tom Hughes, Johnny Harris, and Gerald Kyd.

=== Filming ===
Principal photography took place in April and May 2025 in Farnborough, Camberley, Acton, and Muswell Hill. Other scenes were filmed at the Nabisco Shredded Wheat Factory in Welwyn Garden City, Custom House, and the Adelphi Hotel in Liverpool.

Foreign filming was undertaken in various locations in Morocco.

== Episodes ==
No.	Title	Directed by	Written by	Original release date
1	"Could You Offer More?"	Brady Hood	Neil Forsyth	7 May 2026
England, 1990. Two young people, one the daughter of a cabinet minister, the other a teenage boy on a Liverpool council estate, each dies of heroin overdoses. Facing a growing crisis, the Home Secretary tasks Blake, head of Her Majesty's Customs and Excise, with infiltrating and defeating the drug smugglers. Don, one of his officers and himself a former undercover agent, recruits a number of customs agents to the highly secret but under-resourced operation. The candidates are quickly whittled down to just four agents: Guy, Kate, Bailey, and Erin. Erin is the analyst, while Guy, Kate, and Bailey are the field operatives. By analysing arrest records, Erin identifies London and Liverpool as the main centres of operations for the smugglers, suppliers and dealers, many of whom are Turkish. With the help of Mylonas, an informant of Greek origin who has worked with the Turkish gangs and whom Blake arranges to have released from prison, Guy attempts to infiltrate the Turkish gang in London. Meanwhile Bailey and Kate follow leads in Liverpool. Posing as an associate of Mylonas and a down-on-his-luck businessman looking to get into the drugs trade, Guy works to come closer to kingpin Hakan.
2	"Alliance"	Brady Hood	Neil Forsyth	7 May 2026
Heroin is brought overland from Pakistan via Afghanistan, Iran, and Turkey to London, where Distribution is overseen by Hakan's son, Aziz. A courier delivering heroin to a Glasgow estate is robbed and killed by two men from Liverpool. Guy inveigles his way into Hakan's gang, eventually meeting Hakan himself, gaining his trust. Guy calls his wife Sophie, despite precautions, exposing her to the gang's attention. In Liverpool, Bailey and Kate identify a gang run by Declan Carter, whose underlings, the O'Connell brothers, had killed the Turkish drugs courier, albeit against his wishes. Carter runs a bakery as a front for heroin distribution in Liverpool. Bailey and Kate recruit local VAT officer Shaun to pose as a parolee and take a job at Carter's bakery. Don sets up a fake import business as a cover for Guy. Guy and Mylonas are taken by Hakan to a secret meeting. Kate and Bailey, following Shaun on a delivery, see Carter’s gang collect weapons and depart their base. Both gangs meet up, where Guy, Mylonas, and, from a distance, Kate, Bailey and Erin, witness Hakan and Carter form a cartel. Meanwhile, corrupt DCI Arthur Goodwin, who’s on Carter's payroll, arrests the O'Connell brothers.
3	"This Is Liverpool"	Brady Hood	Neil Forsyth	7 May 2026
A young British army soldier is on leave in Liverpool, ostensibly to visit his family, but gets addicted to heroin during his time there and eventually goes AWOL. He is the son of Eddie McKee, Carter's right-hand man. Hakan arranges for a sample shipment of Turkish heroin to be delivered to Carter's gang at a dog racing track in Birmingham via Guy's company. Kate and Bailey break into Carter's base to plant a bug. Shaun accidentally reveals his facade to his gang overseer, Jed. The handover of the drugs in Birmingham is raided by the police before it can take place, but this is a setup by Don and Guy to prevent the drugs from being delivered while maintaining Guy's cover and allowing him to escape. Hakan accuses Carter of having a rat in his gang, and Carter assumes it is Shaun. Carter gets Shaun's real identity from the corrupt Goodwin. McKee returns home to discover his son has died of an overdose. Carter orders the grief-stricken McKee to murder Shaun by firebombing his house, but Kate and Bailey, forewarned via their bug, are able to rescue Shaun and his family just in time.
4	"The War on Drugs"	Brady Hood	Neil Forsyth	7 May 2026
The O'Connells are sprung from custody during a prison transfer. Despite the police raid in Birmingham, the cartel plans to proceed with a full heroin shipment. McKee anonymously contacts Bailey, revealing the locations of Carter's heroin supply. Zeki tries to take control of importation from Guy as part of a larger scheme to oust Hakan and Aziz and take command of the gang. The O'Connells are out for revenge, so Carter and McKee go into hiding, as a grassroots anti-drugs movement grows in Liverpool led by community organiser Wayne Duffy. Hakan is informed of Zeki's plot and confronts him. The O'Connells track down Carter and McKee. They catch up with McKee, but during a standoff, he talks them into a scheme to bring down Carter, using Goodwin as a connection to blackmail Carter. Blake informs the home secretary of the team's progress, but a subsequent speech by Prime Minister Margaret Thatcher publicly announcing a "War on Drugs" puts the operation in jeopardy. Bailey identifies McKee as his informant through his son's death, and they meet in person. Meanwhile, Hakan and Aziz eliminate Zeki and his co-conspirators, while Carter has the O'Connells killed and personally shoots Duffy in the leg.
5	"Old Kings"	Julian Holmes	Neil Forsyth	7 May 2026
After his purge, Hakan controls the supply chain directly and plans to import, with Carter and Guy, two tonnes of heroin directly from notorious Pashtun warlord Ayub Afridi. Guy is tasked with transporting it by sea to Turkey, but Carter is suspicious. Don and Blake seek support from the Foreign Office. Bailey develops his connection with McKee, while Erin and Kate look into tracing Carter's contact in the Liverpool police. Guy travels to rural Pakistan with Hakan, Aziz, Carter, McKee, and Mylonas and his Afghan wife Zahra, to meet Afridi, while Don and Bailey monitor from Karachi. Kate goes to Liverpool, where she exposes Goodwin and has him arrested. In Pakistan, Afridi and the cartel agree on a deal, and two tonnes of heroin are driven to Karachi, to be loaded onto a ship supposedly owned by Guy's company but actually supplied by Don, and crewed with HM Customs agents. The ship's captain complains that the vessel is not seaworthy, but Don shuts him down, as there is no alternative. McKee catches Guy contacting Don, but does not expose him. Carter, still suspicious of Guy, forces him to travel on the boat with the drugs. Carter begins to suspect McKee.
6	"Legends Never Die"	Julian Holmes	Neil Forsyth	7 May 2026
McKee is exposed as an informant, but escapes. Hakan and Aziz seize the shipment from Guy to hand it over to Carter's men for the European leg of the journey. Bailey, posing as a lawyer, gets information from Goodwin in custody; the interview leads them to Carter's mother. With Thatcher's prime ministership under threat, the home secretary demands a swift, successful conclusion. Don sends Guy home but he struggles to reintegrate into life with Sophie and his daughter Lily, so he returns to work. Erin tracks the shipment to Germany, and she and German police prevent the handover. In London, Guy offers to bring the shipment himself, and Hakan agrees but holds Mylonas as a hostage. Don and the team take a boat to Zeeland and collect the shipment from Aziz. The boat is lost in bad weather, but the team and the shipment are recovered by the coastguard. In London, Guy delivers it to a warehouse where the cartel meets him. Armed police storm the warehouse, arresting Carter, Hakan and members of both gangs. As the Home Secretary displays the seized heroin to the media, the team receives thanks from Blake and Don, but no public acknowledgement. They return to their normal lives.

== Release ==
The series premiered on Netflix on 7 May 2026 with six episodes.

On 14 May, a week after its release, Legends became the most-watched Netflix show worldwide. After ten days it had reached ten million viewers, was number one in 11 countries and in the top ten in 67 countries.

After 28 days, Legends had been watched by over 5.7m viewers in the UK alone, which made it the most watched scripted show across all British networks over the period.

== Reception ==
On the review aggregator website Rotten Tomatoes, 95% of 22 critics' reviews are positive, with an average rating of 7.6/10. The website's consensus reads: "Legends gets the basics of the crime genre right, bringing in clear-cut drama to a daringly real tale and imbuing its narrative with the right balance of respect and spectacle." Metacritic, which uses a weighted average, assigned the series a score of 75 out of 100, based on 10 critics, indicating "generally favorable" reviews.

The Sunday Times declared "At last, Britain has a cop show to rival The Wire" and said Legends was "that rare thing, a remarkable show that tells the story of an entire era" while praising Forsyth's "remarkable ability to capture minor characters’ humanity with immense economy and speed".

In a five-star review, The Financial Times said, "This is outstanding TV, elegant and composed, and it does not let its grip loosen for a second” and praised the "impeccable ensemble cast". In another five-star review, the Radio Times said that Forsyth had "struck gold again" and said his "skill for paring a narrative down to just the fun parts makes this irresistible".

Variety called Legends "a gripping tale of found potential and assumed identity". Collider said that Legends "might be the most watchable crime drama Netflix puts out this year" and praised Forsyth's "knack for turning forgotten chapters of British history into propulsive television". The Times called Legends "superb" and "filled with adrenaline" while The Wall Street Journal praised Coogan's "splendid performance" as a "sober, wounded portrait of a man who has been damaged and knows it". Digital Spy called Legends "bitingly tense" and praised Charlotte Ritchie's "quietly stunning performance".

Screen Rant called Legends a "insightful and gripping masterclass in suspense", The Press and Journal said, “Forsyth executes it with style, tension, narrative perfection and a real sense of the backdrop he’s set it against” and that “this is the closest thing we’ve had to a British version of The Wire”, while the Daily Mail called it an "impassioned anti-drugs thriller".The Herald called Forsyth “Scotland’s finest screenwriter”.

Legends was also well received internationally. The Irish Times called Legends “excellent” and a “gripping, seat-of-the-pants thriller” in which Coogan is “in his element”. In Spain, Mindies said, “Without copying the codes of The Wire, Legends shares with it the desire to x-ray the phenomenon of drug trafficking from multiple angles, including the perspective of the criminals themselves and the social fabric that sustains them”, while El Periódico said “Episode by episode, Forsyth once again clearly reveals himself as one of the great crime drama writers”. In France, Télérama praised the "gripping plot" and AlloCine called Legends a "thriller as rhythmic as it is exciting" and said it had a realism "rare in detective fiction". In Argentina, Micropsia Cine called Legends "Netflix’s standout police drama of the year". In India, The Week magazine gave Legends five stars, calling it "incredible" and "a fitting companion piece to The Wire". In Australia, where Legends topped the Netflix charts, The Australian called it “a sharp, elegantly engineered drama …presented in a hard, tough, move-it-along-at-all-costs fashion”
