= Brink's-Mat robbery =

1983 bullion robbery in London

The Brink's-Mat robbery of 26 November 1983 was one of the largest robberies in British history, with £26 million (equivalent to £290 million in 2025) (Note: based on the LBMA —The London Bullion Market Association— afternoon Gold Fix 8 October 2025) worth of gold bullion, diamonds, and cash stolen. It occurred at the Heathrow International Trading Estate, London, from a warehouse operated by Brink's-Mat, a former joint venture between US security company Brink's and London-based company MAT Transport. The bullion was the property of Johnson Matthey Bankers Ltd. Micky McAvoy and Brian Robinson were convicted of armed robbery. Most of the gold has never been recovered. Lloyd's of London paid out for the losses, and several shooting deaths have been linked to the case.

== Robbery ==
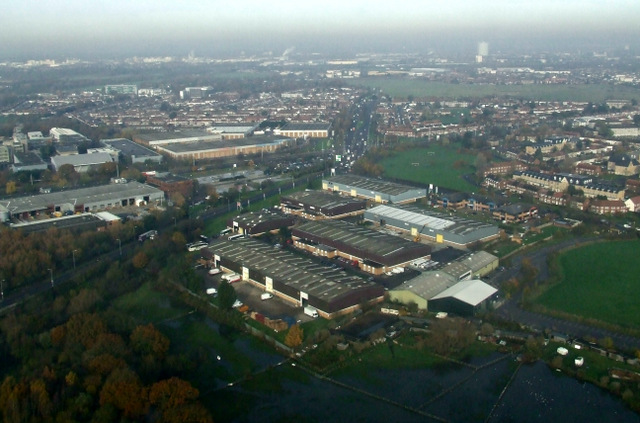
Aerial view of Heathrow International Trading Estate

The Brink's-Mat robbery happened at 06:40 on 26 November 1983 when six robbers broke into the Brink's-Mat warehouse, Unit 7 of the Heathrow International Trading Estate near Heathrow Airport in West London, England.

The gang gained entry to the warehouse from security guard Anthony Black, who was complicit in the robbery. Once inside, they poured petrol over the staff and threatened them with a lit match if they did not reveal the combination numbers of the vault. The robbers thought that they were going to steal around £1 million worth of Spanish pesetas, but they also found three tonnes (96,000 troy oz) of pure gold bullion outside the main vault in 6,800 bars. The gold had been stored at the warehouse overnight before being due to be transferred to Hong Kong the next day. In addition, they stole platinum, 1,000 carats of diamonds and US$250,000 of traveller's cheques. The total value of their haul was £26 million (equivalent to £290 million in 2025).

== Arrests ==
Two days after the robbery, a couple saw a white-hot crucible operating in a garden hut at a neighbour's property near Bath, Somerset. Suspecting it to be linked to the bullion robbery, they immediately informed the police. The police arrived and were shown the hut, but they said it was just beyond their jurisdiction and stated that they would pass the information on to the police responsible for that area. The couple were never asked to give a statement to police nor give evidence in court. No explanation has been given for the police's failure to follow up immediately on the tip-off.

Police soon identified that Black's sister was living with Brian Robinson, who appeared in Flying Squad intelligence files. Black confessed in December 1983 to aiding and abetting the raiders, providing them with impressions of the key to the main door, and giving them details of security measures. He identified his brother-in-law, Brian Robinson, as one of the robbers. Ten days after the robbery, Robinson and Micky McAvoy were arrested. Anthony Black was also arrested.

In January 1985, the premises in Bath were raided and the furnace was found but the occupier, John Palmer, a jeweller and bullion dealer, was on holiday in Tenerife. His former partners Garth Chappell and Terrence Patch were arrested. The sudden movement of £13 million through Bristol area branches of Barclays Bank allegedly came to the notice of the Bank of England, which informed the police although the Bank of England denied this.

McAvoy had entrusted part of his share to associates Brian Perry and George Francis. Perry recruited Kenneth Noye, who was an expert in his field, to dispose of the gold. Noye melted down the bullion and recast it for sale, mixing in copper coins to disguise the source.

Noye was placed under police surveillance. In January 1985, he encountered undercover Detective Constable John Fordham, dressed in camouflage and a balaclava, in the grounds of his home and stabbed him 10 times, resulting in the detective's death. Noye claimed that he had been attacked and killed Fordham in self-defence and at the resulting trial, the jury found him not guilty of murder. Brian Reader was also at the property at the time and put on trial for murder but was acquitted.

In 1986, seven men, including Noye, Reader, Chappell and Patch, were put on trial for handling the stolen gold, with Noye accused of masterminding and controlling the operation to launder the robbery proceeds.

Palmer was extradited to Britain from Brazil in 1986 and was put on trial in 1987. In court, Palmer said he was unaware the gold was linked to the robbery and he was cleared of all charges.

Another suspect, John Fleming, was held in Miami in 1986 after being extradited from Costa Rica where he had arrived following an earlier ejection from Spain. He was subsequently extradited from the US to the UK in 1987 and charged with handling £840,000. Despite the three-year attempt to question him, his case was thrown out of court after just 25 seconds due to insufficient evidence.

In 1988, nine people, including Perry, solicitor Michael Relton and McAvoy's wife Kathleen, were arrested and put on trial for conspiracy to handle stolen goods. Relton was accused of bringing £7.5 million smuggled to Switzerland and Liechtenstein back to the UK to invest in London's property boom in the Docklands. A tenth person, property developer Gordon Parry, was also considered a co-conspirator but initially escaped arrest. The jury failed to reach a verdict for Perry who faced a retrial.

Parry was arrested in Fuengirola, Spain, in 1989 and returned to the UK a year later and charged with handling over £16 million. He went on trial with, among others, Perry, McAvoy's first wife Jacqueline, Patrick Clark, and Jean Savage in 1991. Perry was accused of laundering £7.5 million, Clark and his son £4.5 million and Savage £2.5 million. McAvoy's former wife was alleged to have benefitted from a house her ex-husband bought her. The jury failed to reach a verdict for McAvoy but her house was seized.

== Convictions ==
Anthony Black

Black was sentenced to six years for robbery.

Micky McAvoy, Brian Robinson

Tried at the Old Bailey in December 1984, McAvoy and Robinson were sentenced to 25 years' imprisonment for armed robbery.

McAvoy and Robinson were released from prison in 2000.

Kenneth Noye, Garth Chappell, Brian Reader, Matteo Constantino

In 1986, Noye was found guilty of conspiracy to handle the Brink's-Mat gold, fined £500,000, plus £200,000 costs, and sentenced to 14 years in prison. He served seven years before being released in 1994.

Chappell was jailed for ten years for conspiring to handle stolen goods and fined £200,000 and Reader jailed for eight years. All three men were also convicted of fraudulently conspiring to evade VAT payments.

Constantino was convicted of VAT fraud but acquitted of conspiring to handle stolen goods. He was given a 12-month suspended jail sentence.

Michael Relton, Kathleen McAvoy

In July 1988, Michael Relton was convicted of helping launder proceeds and jailed for 12 years. Kathleen McAvoy was convicted of conspiring to handle the stolen gold but given an 18-month suspended jail sentence.

Gordon Parry, Brian Perry, Patrick Clark, and Jean Savage

In August 1992, Gordon Parry, Brian Perry, Patrick Clark, and Jean Savage were convicted at the Old Bailey. Parry was jailed for ten years, Perry for nine years, Clark for six and Savage for five years.

A few months after leaving prison in 2001, Perry was shot dead.

== Recovery ==
=== Gold ===
Attempts by McAvoy to strike a deal to give back his share of the money in exchange for a reduced sentence failed, as by then the money had vanished. Despite a record reward of £2 million offered for locating the gold, much of the three tonnes of stolen gold has never been recovered. £1 million of gold was found stored at the Bank of England. In 1996, about half of the gold, the portion which had been smelted and recast, was thought to have found its way back into the legitimate gold market, including the reserves of the true owners, Johnson Matthey. According to the BBC, some have claimed that anyone wearing gold jewellery bought in the UK after 1983 is probably wearing Brink's-Mat. The rest of the gold was believed to have been buried.

Lloyd's of London made a record insurance pay out of £26 million.

=== Cash and other assets ===
By 1995, 57 people had assets frozen, including homes and a Kansas oil well and the insurers had recovered £16 million, including £3 million from Noye. In January 1995, the High Court ordered McAvoy to make a payment of £27,488,299, making him responsible for the entire sum stolen. Despite being acquitted of robbery, in 1995 Black was also ordered by the High Court to repay the stolen £26 million plus £2.2 million in compensation and his wife ordered to repay £1.1 million. The judge said that he was satisfied that Black was involved in planning the robbery. By 2004, £25 million had been recovered in total.

=== Counterfeit stolen gold bars ===
On 21 December 1983, less than four weeks after the robbery, police in Austria arrested five men, four Italians and an Austrian, at a Vienna hotel. Police also recovered ten bullion bars bearing the refiner's mark and serial numbers of bars stolen in the Brink's-Mat robbery.

According to the police spokesman, the bars were gold-coated tungsten counterfeits, and therefore could not be Johnson Matthey's stolen gold bars. He said that the arrested men planned to fraudulently claim they were from the Heathrow robbery. No explanation was given as to how the counterfeiters obtained the unpublished bar serial numbers, nor the likely benefit of counterfeiting stolen property in this way.

=== Panama Papers ===
Gordon Parry laundered large amounts of cash from the robbery after the disposal of the gold according to the Panama Papers, which show an offshore financial intermediary firm in Jersey named Centre Services requested Mossack Fonseca set up a Panamanian company 12 months after the Heathrow raid on behalf of an unnamed client. Under Parry's direction, millions of pounds were put through the resulting Feberion and other front companies via banks in Switzerland, Liechtenstein, Jersey and the Isle of Man. A man identified as depositing £800,000 in cash to the Hong Kong & Shanghai Bank is thought to have been notorious armed robber David Moore.

Two nominee directors from Sark were appointed to Feberion and the company then issued two bearer shares. Parry used the offshore firms and recycled the funds, said to have amounted to £10.7 million, through transactions involving land in London Docklands, some buildings that used to form part of Cheltenham Ladies' College, a farmhouse in Kent for McAvoy's girlfriend Kathleen Meacock and a £400,000 home for himself and his family, Crockham House, near Chartwell, Kent. The Metropolitan Police raided the offices of Centre Services in late 1986 in cooperation with the Jersey authorities, seized papers and the two Feberion bearer shares.

In 1987, Jürgen Mossack, the law firm's principal, regained control of the company by dilution. Parry appointed a fresh set of Feberion directors, who were instructed to issue 98 new shares to Western Cross Inc, a front company controlled by Parry or his associates. In 1995, Brink's-Mat solicitors finally took control of Feberion and its assets. Crockham House was sold, and reacquired by Parry's wife, Irene Beaumont.

== Collapse of Johnson Matthey Bankers Ltd ==
On 30 September 1984, less than a year after the Brink's-Mat robbery, the banking and gold-trading arm of Johnson Matthey (Johnson Matthey Bankers Ltd) collapsed and was taken over by the Bank of England to protect the integrity of the London gold markets. Losses amounted to over US$300 million. The bank had made very large loans to fraudsters and insolvent businesses over several years, and had serious and unexplained gaps in its records. The fraud squad was called in to investigate the bank and certain customers.

== "Curse" ==
The so-called "Curse of Brink's-Mat" or "Curse of the Brink's-Mat millions" refers to the shooting deaths of several men who were allegedly involved. These deaths were thought by members of the London criminal underworld to be related to laundering of the gold.

- In 1990, the former treasurer of the Great Train Robbery, Charlie Wilson, had moved to Marbella, Spain, where he was suspected of being involved in drug smuggling. Engaged to launder some of the proceeds from the Brink's-Mat robbery, he lost the investors' £3 million. On 23 April 1990 Wilson was shot dead.
- Nick Whiting, an old schoolfriend of Noye who was questioned on laundering, was found dead after being shot twice and stabbed in 1990.
- Donald Urquhart was one of the launderers of the proceeds of the robbery; he was shot dead in January 1993 on Marylebone High Street in Central London. The supergrass Kenneth Regan assisted police with information about Urquhart's murder. Graeme West was subsequently jailed for Urquhart's killing, as was his accomplice Geoffrey Heath, who planned the murder.
- In 1996, Keith Hedley, a suspected money launderer whose home was searched during the investigation, was shot dead on his yacht in the Mediterranean Sea.
- On 5 December 1998, Hatton Garden jeweller Solly Nahome was shot dead outside his home. Nahome was a "financer" and associate of the Adams family, who were also suspected of having been involved in the laundering of the Brink's-Mat gold. Prior to his murder, Nahome's associate and jeweller Gilbert Wynter had disappeared from the home that he shared with his girlfriend on 9 March 1998. It was thought that Nahome and Wynter were murdered over the disappearance of £800,000 from a cannabis deal, while it was suspected that a rival gang murdered Nahome and Wynter to cause disruption.
- In November 2001, Brian Perry was shot three times in the head in Deptford.
- On 14 May 2003, George Francis was shot dead by John O'Flynn outside Francis' courier business in Petts Wood. Francis was a former associate of the Krays and was believed to have been involved in the laundering of the gold. Francis had survived an attempt on his life when he was shot in the shoulder over the bar in the Henry VIII Inn in Hever which he ran in May 1985, after allegedly failing to pay £100,000 to have a jury acquit Lennie "Teddy Bear" Watkins, who was on trial for the murder of Peter Bennett, a customs investigator who was shot by Watkins in a struggle.
- On 24 June 2015, John "Goldfinger" Palmer was shot dead.

== In popular culture ==
- On 14 November 1992, a made-for-television film called Fool's Gold based on the robbery was aired on ITV with McAvoy portrayed by Sean Bean.
- In 1994, Roger Cook exposed John Palmer for his part in the robbery during an edition of The Cook Report entitled "The Laundry Man".
- On 24 November and 1 December 2003, Channel 4 broadcast Brinks Mat: The Greatest Heist, two-part documentary of the raid in its Secret History strand.
- In 2007, Will Pearson published the book Death Warrant: Kenneth Noye, the Brink's-Mat Robbery And The Gold that provides an account of the heist, chase and convictions as well as personal tragedies and ironies of the events.
- In 2010, a documentary was broadcast on the Crime + Investigation UK network.
- Clarkson, Wensley (29 March 2012). The Curse of Brink's-Mat: Twenty-five Years of Murder and Mayhem - The Inside Story of the 20th Century's Most Lucrative Armed Robbery. Quercus Publishing. ISBN 978-1-84916-650-8.
- On 4 February 2017 Channel 5 aired a documentary updating events, including the death of John Palmer. In the new documentary first-hand accounts from the security guards were given who were on shift the morning of the robbery as well as from officers on the case.
- On 1 April 2017 BBC Radio 4 aired a drama, The Hatton Garden Heist, which included the events of the Brink's-Mat robbery.
- In 2022, Channel 4 aired The Curse, written by the producers and writers of the TV series People Just Do Nothing, fictionalising aspects of the Brink's-Mat robbery.
- In 2023, Channel 5 aired a documentary, including first-hand accounts from the security guards who were on shift the morning of the robbery as well as from officers on the case.
- On 1 February 2023, BBC Radio 5 Live began airing a 6-part documentary and podcast, as part of its Gangster series, about John Palmer and the events that surrounded the robbery.
- On 12 February 2023, BBC One began airing a six-episode drama called The Gold inspired by the robbery, written and created by Neil Forsyth and starring Charlotte Spencer, Dominic Cooper, Hugh Bonneville and Jack Lowden. In 2023, Ebury published The Gold: The Real Story Behind Brink’s-Mat: Britain’s Biggest Heist, to accompany the series. The book was written by the creator of The Gold, Neil Forsyth, along with the show's researcher Thomas Turner. A second series began airing in June 2025. The BBC released a documentary about the robbery, entitled The Gold: The Inside Story in March 2023, following the first series.

== See also ==
- List of heists in the United Kingdom
