= Clerkenwell crime syndicate =

Criminal organisation based in London

- Founded: 1980s
- Founded by: Terry Adams and his brothers Tommy and Patrick
- Founding location: Islington, London, England
- Years active: 1980s–present
- Territory: Various neighbourhoods in London
- Ethnicity: Irish
- Criminal activities: Racketeering, drug trafficking, murder, extortion, bribery, pimping, bookmaking, money laundering, human trafficking, smuggling, fraud, arms trafficking, theft

The Clerkenwell Crime Syndicate, also known as the Adams Family or the A-team, is an English criminal organisation, allegedly one of the most powerful in the United Kingdom. Media reports have credited them with wealth of up to £200 million.

== Background ==
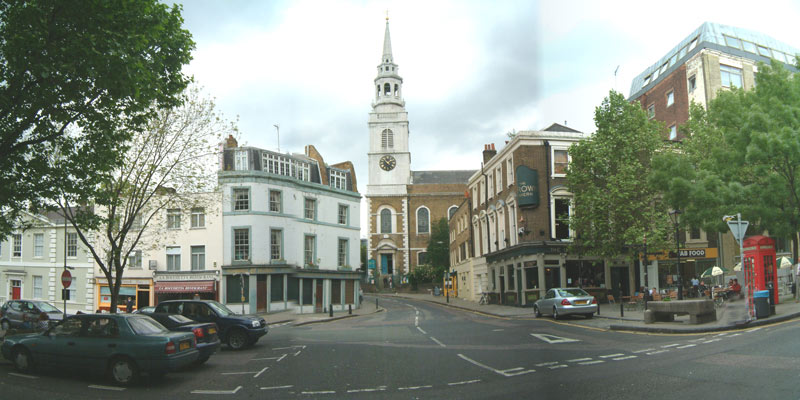
Clerkenwell, East Central London

During the 1980s Terence "Terry" George Adams formed a syndicate with his brothers Thomas "Tommy" Sean Adams and Patrick "Patsy" Daniel John Adams as its financier and enforcer respectively. The brothers were born to Irish parents, part of a large family of 11 children who grew up in Barnsbury, Islington.

The syndicate was based in Clerkenwell while Terry Adams, until his admission of money laundering in 2007, had lived in Barnsbury. The syndicate expanded over the years to include other members of the Adamses' Irish family and close childhood friends.

The gang is allegedly heavily involved in drug trafficking and extortion as well as the hijacking of gold bullion shipments and security fraud. They have been linked to 25 gangland murders of informants and rival criminals. In addition to developing alleged connections to Metropolitan Police officials, they were also stated to have had a British Conservative MP in their pocket at one point.

The shooting of the then 68-year-old "Mad" Frankie Fraser, a former enforcer for The Richardson Gang, in July 1991 was said to have been ordered by the Adams family – though Fraser stated in his autobiography "Mad Frank" that he had been targeted by rogue police. The family is believed to have connections with various criminal organisations, specifically with South American drug cartels.

The BBC has asserted that their influence decreased from 2000 onwards. Police officers, speaking off-record to British newspapers, have said that the family has been credited with acts that they simply did not carry out and judging by the number of alleged key gang members killed or imprisoned below this might well be true; however, the Metropolitan Police took the Adams' crimes so seriously they considered the need to involve not only a hand-picked Crown Prosecution Service lead team of detectives but additionally the full weight of the UK's top secret military intelligence and security service, MI5, in order to crack the Adams mafia-like organised crime cartel.

Tommy Adams was imprisoned for his involvement in money laundering and a drugs plot that was described as not having been sanctioned by his brothers. During an 18-month bugging operation by MI5, Terry Adams was recorded speaking about his brother in very strident terms and suggesting that, in 1998 at least, relations between them were kept to a minimum. It has been stated that they have a criminal fortune of up to £200 million.

Before Tommy and Terry Adams were convicted in 1998 and 2007 respectively, the failure of the police to secure convictions against them had led to a belief that they had undermined the justice system to become untouchables. Police, Crown Prosecution Service staff and jurors were said to have been bribed and intimidated leading to not-guilty verdicts against members of the gang that were said to be wrong.

The gang's alleged leader, Terry Adams, has been serving a prison sentence since February 2007, and two of his brothers are under surveillance by the Serious Organised Crime Agency and police in Spain, making other criminals reluctant to do business with them. It has been said that Terry Adams faces severe financial difficulties having been ordered, in May 2007, to repay £4.7 million in legal aid and pay prosecution costs of £800,000.

Sean "Tommy" Adams gained high-profile public attention during a trial in 2004, when he was described as having attended a meeting in 2002 at the request of the former football international Kenny Dalglish. Dalglish was a major shareholder in Wilmslow based sports agency Pro Active, a leading sports management firm headed up by local Wilmslow businessman Paul Stretford. Dalglish was reported to have hired Adams during a protracted deal to secure Pro Active's exclusive management rights to Manchester United and England football striker Wayne Rooney, in circumstances where another company claimed to represent Rooney.

In February 2010 a 38-year-old man, claiming to be Terry Adams' nephew, was convicted in a case known as the jigsaw murder: the trial revealed that the man, Stephen Marshall, had disposed four bodies for the Adamses, which sentenced him to at least 36 years in prison.

In 2014, Sean "Tommy" Adams and 13 other people believed to be affiliated with the Clerkenwell Crime Syndicate were arrested in a police operation codenamed "Octopod." Designer watches, six shotguns and large sums of cash were found in other addresses across the city, with a concentration in north London. The arrests were linked to conspiracy to assault, money laundering, fraud and revenue offences.

At the time, in December 2014, of the death of a bankrupt businessman Scot Young, who had been involved in 2013 in a high-profile divorce case, media reports that flagged Young's involvement with Patrick Adams asserted that Tommy Adams and Michael Adams faced no charges after their arrest earlier in 2014.

== Personnel ==
=== Terry Adams ===
Terence George Adams (born 18 October 1954 in London) was described as having more recently "adopted an almost genteel persona, buying clothes in expensive fabrics and indulging his love of art and antiques" to appear legitimate.

His downfall came with the assistance of MI5 and the Inland Revenue. MI5, in a unique inter-departmental collaboration the first of its kind after the Cold War ended, played a leading part in the electronic war against organised crime—and turned its sights on Adams's international criminal cartel. Police and MI5 set up a secret squad to dismantle the Adams organisation, directed from an anonymous Hertfordshire address inside a secret bunker sitting somewhere on the busy Hoddesdon commuter belt into London. Some of the recordings made over a period of 18 months suggested that Adams had retired from front line involvement in crime in 1990.

Police sources believe Adams knew he was being monitored and had "stage managed" many conversations for the benefit of his defence. He, for example, was allegedly caught on tape, in 1998, telling his adviser Solly Nahome that he did not want to be involved with a particular illegal deal, which would affect his legitimate business. The Inland Revenue was suspicious enough to ask Adams to explain how he had amassed his personal fortune including his £2 million house and his collection of valuable antiques. Adams invented a range of unlikely occupations, including jeweller and public relations executive. Transcripts of the surveillance and investigations into several front companies Adams set up proved he was lying.

He was arrested in April 2003; detectives found art and antiques valued at £500,000, £59,000 in cash, and jewellery worth more than £40,000 in his home. On 9 March 2003 at a hearing at the Old Bailey, Andrew Mitchell QC summed up the prosecution's case in saying, "It is suggested that Terry Adams was one of the country’s most feared and revered organised criminals. He comes with a pedigree, as one of a family whose name had a currency all of its own in the underworld. A hallmark of his career was the ability to keep his evidential distance from any of the violence and other crime from which he undoubtedly profited." The former Scottish gangster Paul Ferris asserted that none of the brothers is primus inter pares (first among equals or in sole charge).

On 18 May 2007 Adams was ordered to pay £4.8 million in legal fees to three law firms who had initially represented him under the UK's free legal aid scheme. He was also required to pay £800,000 in prosecution costs.

He admitted a single specimen money-laundering offence on 7 February 2007, and was jailed for seven years; he was released on 24 June 2010, but was recalled to prison in August 2011 for breaching his licence. Also, on 21 May 2007, he was ordered to file reports of his income for the next ten years. Open case files remain untried on Operation Trinity records and rumour still exists that several further prosecutions may eventually come to trial.

In August 2011 he appeared before City of London Magistrates' court, charged with 8 breaches of his Financial Reporting Order imposed upon him in 2007.

District judge Quentin Purdy said he was "shrewd and calculating...You wilfully and, in my judgment, arrogantly sought to frustrate the effect of a financial reporting order, well knowing that a significant confiscation order remains largely unpaid."

In July 2014 Adams appeared before a High Court Judge in London, where he claimed that he was penniless and living in a one-bedroom apartment. Adams was ordered to pay £650,000 under the Proceeds of Crime Act.

In March 2017 Adams lost his appeal against the order to pay £700,000 under the Proceeds of Crime Act. In November 2017 a District Judge sitting in Weston-super-Mare ordered Terry Adams to pay the remaining amount within 30 days or return to prison for at least 2.5 years. In December 2017 Adams repaid the entire confiscation order (around £725,000) despite his repeated claims of poverty. He also attempted to gag the press to stop people knowing that he had repaid the confiscation rather than return to jail. A source close to the investigation said that he must have found the nearly 3/4 million pound "down the back of the sofa".

=== Tommy Adams ===
Thomas Sean Adams (born in 1958 in London) is allegedly financier for his brothers Terry and Patrick. A married father of four, he still has a home near the family's traditional Islington base, but is now living in Spain.

Tommy Adams was charged with involvement in the handling of Brink's-MAT gold bullion but in 1985 was cleared of involvement in the laundering of the proceeds during a high-profile Old Bailey trial with co defendant Kenneth Noye.

Tommy Adams is suspected of establishing connections to other international criminal organisations including numerous Yardie gangs as well as gaining an $80 million credit line from Colombian drug cartels. In 1998, Adams was convicted of masterminding an £8 million hashish smuggling operation into Britain for which he was jailed for seven years. At trial he was also ordered to pay an unprecedented £6 million criminal assets embargo, or face an additional five years' imprisonment on top of his seven-year term. On appeal the criminal assets embargo was later reduced by appeal judges to £1M largely due to the CPS not having sufficient material evidence, bank accounts or traceable assets to locate and verify Adams' criminal wealth. Tommy Adams' wife, Androulla, paid his £1M criminal assets embargo in cash just two days before the CPS deadline.

Tommy was further convicted of money laundering and sentenced to 7 years in 2017 after a number of significant cash seizures of criminal money were linked to him. Money from crime in Manchester was collected and sent to Tommy via trusted associates.

=== Patsy Adams ===
Patrick Daniel John Adams (born 2 February 1956 in London) gained an early reputation in London's underworld by using high-speed motorcycles in gangland murders, and was a suspect in at least 25 organised-crime related deaths over a three-year period. He was sentenced to seven years in prison in the 1970s for an armed robbery.

Although subordinate to Terry Adams, Patrick – sometimes known as Patsy – has participated in individual criminal activities. Most notably he is suspected of the 1991 murder attempt on Frankie Fraser; also, according to one account, he assaulted Fraser's son David Fraser with a knife, cutting off part of his ear during a drug deal. During the late 1990s, he was reported to spend much of his time in Spain. The Independent stated in 2001 that he was "living in exile in Spain in a walled villa bristling with security cameras a few miles south of Torremolinos". Patrick Adams and his wife were wanted in connection with an attempted murder in Clerkenwell, London on 22 December 2013 and were arrested in Amsterdam on 7 August 2015. Adams, admitted shooting Paul Tiernan but he was cleared of attempted murder after the victim refused to cooperate with police because he believed 'loyalty is everything' and said that being called a 'grass' hurt more than being shot. Adams admitted causing grievous bodily harm with intent at Woolwich Crown Court and was sentenced to nine years in 2016.

Police who searched Adams's flat in the days after the shooting found a handwritten note from Tiernan, which said 'I ain't no f****** grass' and urged his former friend to 'face me'.

== Associates ==
Gilbert Wynter, an enforcer for the family, disappeared in 1998. Four years before, he was cleared of killing the former British high-jump champion Claude Moseley after a key prosecution witness refused to give evidence at the Old Bailey.

Saul "Solly" Nahome, shot dead outside his £300,000 home in Finchley, north London, in 1998 by an assassin who escaped on a motorcycle, was suspected of acting as a financial adviser to the family. Nahome, a diamond merchant in Hatton Garden, Clerkenwell, was recruited by the syndicate and is thought by police to have laundered the money through the jewellery business, a restaurant in Smithfield and a West End nightclub. Nahome was known to police as complicit with the laundering of the proceeds of Brink's-Mat gold bullion theft.

== Connections to other gangsters ==
The Adams family have long been connected to Christopher "Chrissy" Brayford and other individuals who helped sell the stolen gold, including Kenneth Noye.
