= Operation Tiberius =

Internal Metropolitan Police investigation

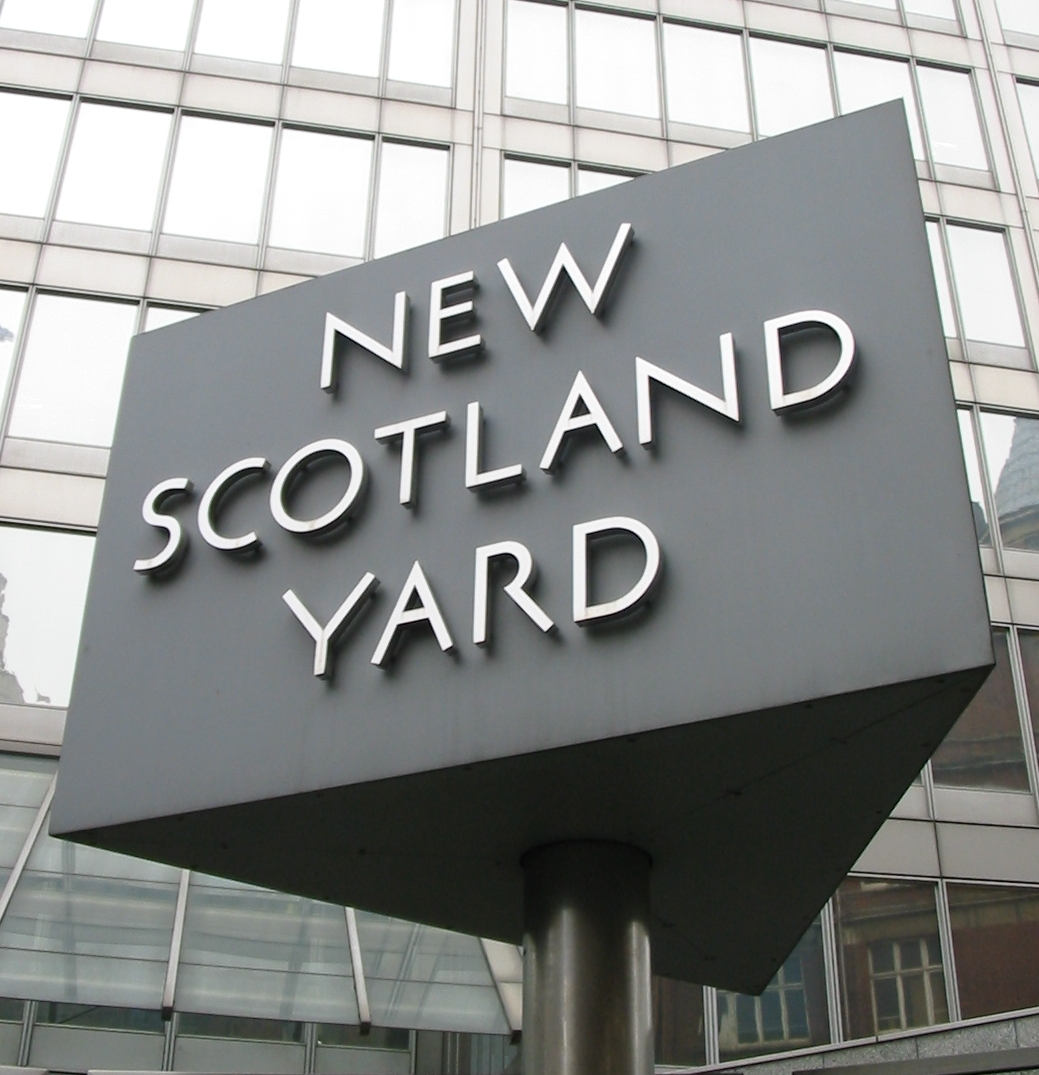
Metropolitan Police Headquarters, London

Operation Tiberius was a 2002 internal London Metropolitan Police investigation, leaked to The Independent in 2014. It found that criminal organisations had used Freemasonry connections to "recruit corrupt officers". The Metropolitan Police acknowledged that it was borne of other investigations, but described it as a new strategic approach to corruption, rather than a single operation.

The Parliamentary Home Affairs Committee has published a redacted copy of a summary of the investigation, with a lengthy annexe detailing other earlier corruption investigations, especially Operation Russell. It investigated the charge that certain "organised criminals" were able to infiltrate Scotland Yard by bribery. 19 former and 42 then serving officers were investigated for alleged corruption. It has been claimed that the Metropolitan Police suffered "endemic corruption" and given the small number of convictions, doubt has been expressed over whether this police force has extirpated the problem.

The report concluded that the infiltration was one of "the most difficult aspects of organised crime corruption to proof against".

Some of Britain’s most dangerous organised crime syndicates were able to infiltrate New Scotland Yard "at will".

Allegations of evidence tampering, interference with the pursuit of criminal suspects by other forces, and close cooperation between senior police officers and master criminals, particularly those involved in illicit drugs and prostitution, have been raised. Charges that jurors were bought off or threatened to return not-guilty verdicts, corrupt individuals working for HMRC, both in the UK and overseas, and "get out of jail free cards" being bought for £50,000 are also cited in the report.

I feel that at the current time I cannot carry out an ethical murder investigation without the fear of it being compromised. Unnamed MPS Senior Investigating Officer, currently attached to SO 1(3), cited in the Independent's report

== John Palmer ('Goldfinger') protected by corrupt officers ==
One of the highest-ranking gangsters in the UK, John Palmer, was alleged by The Times, based on Operation Tiberius files, to have been protected from arrest and investigation by a clique of high-ranking corrupt Metropolitan Police officers. Palmer's companions were once discovered with a silenced Uzi submachine gun and 380 rounds of ammunition.

== Panorama (BBC programme) ==
On 29 February 2016, the BBC screened an edition of Panorama entitled "Cops, Criminals, Corruption: The Inside Story". It covered police corruption, including material uncovered by Operation Tiberius. However, there was no mention of the manner in which contacts were established and maintained between senior police officers and criminals. In particular, there was no mention of the involvement of Freemasonry, in contrast to The Independent article and what had been leaked from the Operation Tiberius report.

== See also ==
- Operation Countryman
- Operation Othona
- David Hunt (gangster)
