= The Gold: The Inside Story =

2023 BBC crime documentary

The Gold: The Inside Story is a 2023 BBC crime documentary about the 1983 Brink's-Mat robbery, in which three tonnes of gold were stolen.

== See also ==
- The Gold (TV series), a 2023 BBC dramatisation of the robbery
