= John Palmer (criminal) =

English gangster (1950-2015)

- Born: John Edward Palmer; September 1950; Solihull, Warwickshire, England
- Died: 24 June 2015 (aged 64); Brentwood, Essex, England
- Other name: Goldfinger
- Occupations: Timeshare/mortgage fraudster; gold dealer
- Spouse: Marnie Ryan (m. 1975)

John Edward Palmer (September 1950 – 24 June 2015) was an English criminal, former market trader and gold dealer, involved in various criminal activities including mortgage and timeshare fraud.

The police believed that much of his alleged £300 million fortune was the result of swindles, violence, racketeering and money laundering. Palmer owned a complex network of 122 companies, many offshore in the Isle of Man, Madeira and the British Virgin Islands, as well as 60 offshore bank accounts.

== Early life ==
Palmer was born in Solihull, Warwickshire, one of seven children. Reportedly dyslexic, Palmer left school at 15 and joined his brother Malcolm in a roof tiling business and also sold paraffin from "the back of a lorry". He married Marnie J. A. Ryan in 1975 in Bristol.

He ran a gold and jewellery dealing company, Scadlynn Ltd, in Bedminster, Bristol with business partners Garth Victor Chappell and Terence Edward James Patch. Palmer and Chappell had been arrested in 1980 when they worked together selling furniture. The two men were charged with obtaining credit on furniture by providing false references, with Palmer receiving a six-month suspended prison sentence.

== Brink's-Mat involvement and acquittal ==
In 1985, following the November 1983 Brink's-Mat robbery, Chappell and Patch of Scadlynn Ltd were arrested for their involvement in melting down £26 million worth of gold from the robbery to try to pass it off as legitimate. Two days after armed robbers Brian Robinson and Micky McAvoy were jailed, Chappell withdrew £348,000 from the company's accounts. Throughout their trial, a total of £1.1 million had been withdrawn.

During the raids, one of the suspects refused to confirm what they had been melting that morning. It was revealed that the company had been processing millions of pounds' worth of gold, but claimed it was gold they had purchased themselves. The company's books stated that they were selling the melted gold for virtually the same amount as they had purchased it for—which didn't make sense, unless the records were false. Confiscated documents also showed that the company had been evading tax, and so they were ordered to pay £80,000 in unpaid tax.

Palmer evaded arrest at the time, after fleeing to Tenerife with his family only days prior to his company being raided and its directors arrested. His family returned to England, whilst he sold his remaining assets back home and set up a timeshare business at Island Village, near Playa de las Américas. He attempted to move to Brazil after Spain signed an extradition treaty with the UK, but he was arrested and his entry refused as he had travelled on an expired passport. Deported back to England, he was forced to face trial.

Despite Palmer admitting to melting down gold bars from the robbery in his garden, he was acquitted during the trial in 1987 after claiming that he was not aware they were stolen. Chappell was sentenced to ten years in the earlier trial.

In 1993 The Independent reported that he was subject to an asset-freezing Mareva Injunction gained by Brink's-Mat from the High Court of Justice, enabling investigators to track his substantial financial resources. He later paid out £360,000 to Lloyd's as a result of a civil action brought against him, but continued to plead his innocence in the 1983 robbery, and in 1999 claimed the authorities were persecuting him. For his connection to the Brink's-Mat robbery, Palmer acquired the sobriquet of 'Goldfinger'.

== Conviction for time-share fraud and later events ==
In 2001, he defended himself after sacking his legal team in one of the longest fraud trials in British legal history. He was found guilty "of masterminding the largest timeshare fraud on record" and jailed for eight years. It is reported that he swindled 20,000 people out of £30 million, but attempts by the Crown to confiscate this profit were later stopped in a court hearing. Sentenced to 8 years, he served just over half of this term. His fortune at the time of his conviction was estimated at £300 million, but Palmer was declared bankrupt in 2005 with debts of £3.9m.

In 2007, he was arrested on charges including fraud. Reportedly, he had been able to continue his criminal activities during his incarceration, following his 2001 conviction. In 2009, after two years without charge in a high security Spanish jail, he was released on bail, but was required to report to court authorities every two weeks.

In 2015, it was alleged by The Times from leaked Operation Tiberius files, that Palmer was protected from arrest and investigation by a clique of high-ranking corrupt Metropolitan Police officers. Palmer's companions were reportedly once detained in possession of a silenced Uzi submachine gun and 380 rounds of ammunition.

== Death ==
Palmer was murdered on 24 June 2015 at the age of 64 in his gated home in South Weald, near Brentwood, Essex by means of gunshot wounds to the chest, abdomen, arm, elbow, back and kidneys. That he had been shot six times was only revealed during a post mortem as he had undergone gallbladder surgery for which the wounds were mistaken.

A special BBC documentary presented by broadcaster Roger Cook (who exposed Palmer in a 1994 edition of The Cook Report entitled "The Laundry Man") revealed that since 1999, police had run an intelligence operation on Palmer from the RAF Spadeadam base in Cumbria. Palmer was under electronic surveillance by a secret police intelligence unit for 16 years until his assassination by a hitman in 2015, according to the special BBC television investigation. The Serious and Organised Crime Agency (Soca), now the National Crime Agency, had gathered intelligence on Palmer in an operation codenamed Alpine because of concerns of corruption in the Metropolitan police.

Palmer's two partners Christina Ketley and Saskia Mundinger, who both had children together with Palmer, demanded payouts from him in 2005 to keep them and their children in an appropriate manner. He also had two daughters with his wife Marnie.

On 4 February 2017, a 50-year-old man was questioned on suspicion of Palmer's murder. Police said they had questioned a man who was originally from Tyneside although currently living in southern Spain. The man was not arrested but volunteered to be interviewed at a police station in the UK. The force did not specify at which police station he was interviewed.

== In popular culture ==
In the BBC drama series The Gold, Palmer is played by Tom Cullen.

== See also ==
- Operation Tiberius – Internal Metropolitan Police investigation
