= Gilbert Wynter =

Missing Person

- Born: 1961; London, England
- Disappeared: 9 March 1998 (age 37); Tottenham, London, England
- Status: Missing for 28 years, 7 months and 17 days

Gilbert Wynter (c. 1961 – disappeared 1998) was a 37-year-old jeweller who vanished without a trace in Tottenham, London, England in March 1998. He is widely believed either to have been murdered or to be in hiding in the Caribbean.

== Gang activity ==
Wynter worked as an enforcer for the Adams family crime syndicate. In 1994, allegedly with assistance from fellow enforcer and future crime boss Ray Barton, he murdered drug dealer Claude Moseley with a samurai sword as punishment for pocketing profits from a drug operation run by the Adams family. He went on trial for the murder, but key witnesses refused to give evidence against him, with one preferring to go to jail for contempt of court, and as a result, the case was dropped.

== Disappearance ==
On 9 March 1998, Wynter left the house he shared with his girlfriend, driving off in her Nissan Micra. Later that day, he spoke to her by phone but did not disclose his location. Wynter was never seen again, and the car was subsequently discovered abandoned in June. His bank account, credit card and mobile phone have not been used since then.

== Theories ==
There are two main theories for the disappearance, both hinging on a cannabis deal where £800,000 went missing. Either Wynter double-crossed the Adams family, stole the money and was killed accordingly in retribution (allegedly being buried in the foundations of the Millennium Dome), or fled to the Caribbean with the money and remained in hiding.

== Related deaths ==
Saul Nahome, financial advisor to the Adams family, was gunned down in front of his house by an unknown assailant on 5 December 1998. Initially, it was claimed that he was murdered by the Adams gang, due to fears he might crack under police pressure and inform on the rest of the gang. Police at the time dismissed this, claiming that most likely he was killed by a rival gang in order to cause disruption. However, Nahome and Wynter knew each other personally, had worked together in the past, and Nahome was allegedly involved in the same cannabis deal as Wynter, so police now believe that Wynter's disappearance and Nahome's murder are related. In 2011, police reexamined evidence and questioned crime boss Terry Adams and 20 other gang members including former ally Barton about both men, but with no results. It has been suggested that former Adams family enforcer and Bristol drug baron Andrew Baker was responsible for the murder of both men.

== See also ==
- List of fugitives from justice who disappeared
- List of people who disappeared mysteriously (2000–present)
