= Tony Lundy =

British police detective

- Known for: Involvement in 'supergrass' trials of criminals in the 1970s and 1980s, particularly the cases of David Smith, Harry MacKenney and John Childs.
- Notable work: Sold his story to the News of the World, entitled 'Bent or Brilliant?'
- Police career
- Country: Metropolitan Police Service
- Department: Flying Squad
- Service years: 1970s - 1988
- Status: Retired
- Rank: Detective Superintendent

Tony Lundy was a Detective Superintendent within the Metropolitan Police Service, most famous for his involvement in the 'supergrass' trials of criminals in the 1970s and 1980s.

== Supergrasses ==
Throughout the 1970s, the supergrass was a feared tool that the police had begun using which is generally considered to have begun with Bertie Smalls, who, faced with a hefty prison sentence for his part in leading his gang of armed robbers, the 'Wembley Mob', decided to turn 'Queen's Evidence' against his fellow thieves which resulted in them receiving heavy prison sentences whilst Smalls was granted immunity from prosecution. Although after the Smalls trial immunity could no longer be granted, criminals who turned supergrass could expect to be rewarded with the 'supergrass tariff', normally a sentence of around five years, most of which would be spent in police custody.

== Early successes ==
In May 1977 Lundy, then a Detective Chief Inspector, rejoined the flying squad. His first success was with David Smith in September of that year. Smith was involved in a wages snatch in Borehamwood, Hertfordshire, along with George Williams, who too turned supergrass. Smith's confession resulted in sixty nine people being charged, of which ninety per cent pleaded guilty. Lundy was also involved in the initial investigation into Henry 'Big H' MacKenney and John 'Bruce' Childs, who was the first serial murderer in modern times to turn supergrass.

== Retirement ==
Lundy retired from the Metropolitan Police in 1988 on ill-health grounds suffering from stress. He was investigated in October 1994 and the Crown Prosecution Service stated they had found no evidence to prosecute Lundy. Lundy stated that throughout the investigation he had not once been interviewed. He also sold his story to the News of the World, entitled 'Bent or Brilliant?' He now resides in Spain.
