= Pumpkin Diamond =

- Weight: 5.54 carats (1.108 g)
- Color: Fancy Vivid Orange
- Cut: Cushion
- Country of origin: Central African Republic
- Discovered: 1997
- Cut by: William Goldberg
- Original owner: unnamed farmer
- Owner: private owner from Indonesia bought in 2005
- Estimated value: USD 3 million

The Pumpkin Diamond is a diamond weighing 5.54 carats (1.108 g) rated in color as Fancy Vivid Orange by the Gemological Institute of America. While this may seem small when compared to other famous diamonds, the Pumpkin Diamond is, in fact, one of the largest Fancy Vivid Oranges the GIA reports having rated and is unique compared to other orange diamonds because it is light-colored and notably intense. The Pumpkin Diamond was mined in Central African Republic and then imported into South Africa for sale, it was later cut and polished by William Goldberg, and put to auction at Sotheby's where it was bought by Ronald Winston of the House of Harry Winston for the price of $1.3 million. It is currently estimated to be valued at $3 million.

Formerly referred to simply as the 5.54 Vivid Orange, Winston named the diamond "The Pumpkin Diamond" as he bought it the day before Halloween. After buying the Pumpkin, Winston proceeded to have the diamond set in a ring between two smaller white diamonds. Halle Berry wore the ring to the 2002 Oscars where she won the Academy Award for Best Actress for her role in Monster's Ball.

While it is difficult to tell exactly what status the Pumpkin Diamond currently enjoys, the official GIA web site reports it as "one of the largest Fancy Vivid orange natural color diamonds in the world." The Color Diamond Encyclopedia, on the other hand, terms it "the world's largest fancy vivid orange diamond." In 1997, when it was purchased by The House of Harry Winston, the Gemstone Forecaster referred to it as "the only vivid orange ever graded by the GIA" (which is incorrect as there are several other vivid orange stones graded by GIA and offered for sale on websites, past and present).

The Pumpkin Diamond was displayed as part of the Smithsonian's "The Splendor of Diamonds" exhibit, alongside The De Beers Millennium Star, the world's largest top colour (D) internally and externally flawless pear-shaped diamond at 203.04 carat (40.608 g) and The Heart of Eternity, a 27.64 carat (5.528 g) heart-cut blue diamond.

== See also ==
- List of diamonds
