= Ocean Dream Diamond =

Blue-green diamond

Ocean Dream
- Weight: 5.51 carats (1.102 g)
- Color: Fancy Deep Blue-Green
- Cut: Fancy trillion
- Country of origin: Central Africa
- Cut by: Master Cutter Mazhar Saylam
- Owner: Cora Diamond Corp.

The Ocean Dream is a diamond, measuring 5.51 carats (1.102 g), and rated in color as Fancy Deep Blue-Green by the Gemological Institute of America. The Ocean Dream is the first and one of the only natural diamonds known to the GIA to possess a blue-green hue (besides the Ocean Paradise Diamond owned by the Nahshonov Group, found in Brazil in 2012), making it one of the rarest diamonds in the world. A blue-green colour is commonly seen in artificially enhanced diamonds, whose colour is imparted by various irradiation methods. The Ocean Dream originated in Central Africa, and is currently owned by the Cora Diamond Corporation.

The Ocean Dream was displayed in 2003 as part of the Smithsonian's "The Splendor of Diamonds" exhibit, alongside the De Beers Millennium Star, The Heart of Eternity, the Steinmetz Pink, and the Moussaieff Red.

== See also ==
- List of diamonds
