= Kazanjian =

Kazanjian or Kazandjian (Western Armenian: Գազանճյան) is an Armenian surname, derived from Turkish kazancı 'boilermaker, 'coppersmith', from kazan 'cauldron, boiler' + -cı (agentive suffix). Notable people with the surname include:

- Anna Kazanjian Longobardo (1928–2020), American engineer and business executive
- Arlene Francis (née Kazanjian; 1907–2001), American game show panelist, presenter and actress
- Dodie Kazanjian (born 1952), American arts writer
- Howard Kazanjian (born 1942), American film producer
- Jean Kazandjian (born 1938), French artist
- Karekin II Kazanjian (1927–1998), Armenian Patriarch of Constantinople
- Varaztad Kazanjian (1879–1974), Armenian-American oral surgeon

== See also ==
- Kazanjian Red Diamond, a red diamond from South Africa purchased by the Kazanjian Brothers jewelry
- Kazandjiev
