= Red diamond =

Rare red-coloured variety of diamond

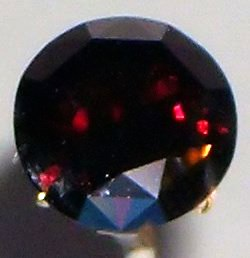
- DeYoung Red Diamond

General
- Category: Native minerals
- Formula: C
- Strunz classification: 1.CB.10a
- Crystal system: Cubic
- Crystal class: Hexoctahedral (m3̅m); H-M symbol: (4/m 3̅ 2/m)

Identification
- Formula mass: 12.01 g/mol
- Color: Red
- Crystal habit: Octahedral
- Twinning: Spinel law common (yielding "macle")
- Cleavage: 111 (perfect in four directions)
- Fracture: Conchoidal (shell-like)
- Mohs scale hardness: 10 (defining mineral)
- Luster: Adamantine
- Diaphaneity: Transparent to subtransparent to translucent
- Density: 3.5–3.53 g/cm^{3}
- Polish luster: Adamantine
- Optical properties: Isotropic
- Refractive index: 2.418 (at 500 nm)
- Birefringence: None
- Pleochroism: None
- Dispersion: 0.044
- Melting point: Pressure dependent

Red diamonds are diamonds that display a red color and exhibit the same mineral properties as colorless diamonds. They are commonly known as the most expensive and the rarest diamond color in the world, even more so than pink or blue diamonds, as very few red diamonds have been found. Red diamonds, just like pink diamonds, are greatly debated as to the source of their color, but the gemological community most commonly attributes both colors to gliding atoms in the diamond's structure as it undergoes enormous pressure during its formation.

Red diamonds are among the 12 colors of fancy color diamonds, and have the most expensive price per carat. They will typically run in the hundreds of thousands of dollars per carat range. Since they are the rarest color, it is difficult to find them in large sizes, and they are mostly found in sizes less than 1 carat. Red diamonds only exist with one color intensity, Fancy, although their clarities can range from Flawless to Included, just like white diamonds. The largest and most flawless red diamond is the 5.11 carat Fancy Red Moussaieff Red Diamond, which has internally flawless clarity.

== Origin of the red color ==
Despite decades of research, scientists are still inconclusive to the source of red color in diamonds. It is believed that the cause of the pink color in pink diamonds is the origin of red color as well but in a more concentrated amount. The most accepted theory is during the diamond's formation, plastic deformation is caused in the crystal lattice structure. Some of the atoms are misplaced as the diamond moves up through its kimberlite deposit, and the intense pressure of this movement causes the varying shades of pinks, or reds, to appear.

This lends credence to the hypothesis that red diamonds are dark pink diamonds, and why only one color intensity is possible. Red diamonds can be modified by the same secondary colors that can be found in pink diamonds as well.

The red color can also be produced by irradiating a colorless diamond with high-energy particles and then annealing it at high pressures and high temperatures.

== Properties determining value ==
Since red diamonds are classified as diamonds in every sense, they are also graded by the typical four Cs of Connoisseurship: Color, Clarity, Cut and Carat weight. Like with all fancy color diamonds, the Color attribute is considered the absolute most important characteristic of the diamond and is largely what determines its value. The next most important attribute is the diamond's carat weight, followed by its clarity, and cut. Given their rarity, red diamonds are among the most expensive gemstones on average. Red diamonds can cost at least US$1 million per carat, and most of the known specimens are less than half a carat.

=== Color ===
The color in red diamonds is assessed according to its hue and saturation. Red diamonds can occur with secondary colors, such as brown-red, orange-red, or purple-red, but red is not a modifying color for any other diamond color. Additionally, red diamonds never appear with a tertiary modifying color, as is the case in other diamond colors.

A pure red diamond is ideal but an even rarer find than a red with a secondary color. Like with other diamond colors, a purely red diamond will fetch a higher per carat price than one with a secondary hue. Brownish red and Orangey red diamonds are generally considered inferior to Purplish Red diamonds and are priced accordingly. All of these colors run upwards of $400,000 per carat, but a pure red diamond can cost significantly more per carat.

Few colors of fancy color diamonds are characterized by having a singular color intensity. This phenomenon only exists with three colors: black diamonds, white diamonds, and red diamonds. Since the source of the red in red diamonds is considered to be a hyper-concentrated occurrence of pink, this would actually make red the darkest shade of pink possible, which is why it is only able to appear in one intensity. Red diamonds will only be graded Fancy Red, Fancy Brownish Red, Fancy Purplish Red, or Fancy Orangey Red. An easy way identify whether a red diamond is a counterfeit is if the seller is offering it with an intensity grade like other diamond colors (Fancy Light, Fancy Intense, Fancy Vivid etc.).

There are so few red diamonds that the GIA records show that over a 30-year period from 1957–1987, not a single GIA lab report with the term “red” was issued. Some diamond polishers have achieved a GIA grading of Fancy Red for a diamond by re-polishing a Fancy Deep Pink diamond, although this is very hard to accomplish and has only been successfully completed less than a handful of times.

=== Clarity ===
In order to determine the clarity of a diamond, it is examined under a loupe, which is magnification device that enlarges the visual field 10X. Diamonds are inspected to determine whether there are inclusions on its outside or on the inside. Red diamond clarity is measured like all diamonds on the scale from Flawless to Included. Most red diamonds fall within the range of VS1 – SI2 due to the nature of how they were formed. However, the largest and most famous red diamond, the Moussaieff Red, was graded with an Internally Flawless clarity, but a red diamond's clarity has little effect on its value because of the rarity of the color. A red diamond buyer will be far more interested in the purity of the red and the carat size in order to decide on its desirability. This is not true for all diamond colors, but it is especially so for the colors that are highest in demand, namely red, pink and blue. For the less expensive colors, such as yellow and brown, clarity will be more of a factor.

=== Carat weight ===
Red diamonds are known for their small sizes. The majority of red diamonds on the market are less than 1 carat in weight. Only 5 red diamonds are known to exceed 5 carats in weight, the largest being 5.11 carats. Only a handful of red diamonds are discovered on an annual basis throughout the world, and most of them do not exceed 1 carat. Red diamonds are priced per carat, as all diamonds, and their per carat price is 300–400% higher than the per carat prices of the next most expensive diamonds, pink diamonds and blue diamonds.

=== Fluorescence ===
Most red diamonds display fluorescence when placed under UV light. In the case of colorless diamonds, the presence of fluorescence is generally considered to lower a diamond's value. This is in fact completely arbitrary, as the blue glow may or may not appeal to a buyer, but it certainly has no bearing on the composition, durability or beauty of a diamond. However, it is a generally accepted notion in the diamond assessment world that the presence of fluorescence will lower a diamond's value. Just like with clarity, in the case of fancy color diamonds, this is not a detracting characteristic if it is present. If anything, its presence assures the buyer that the diamond is genuine, as fluorescence is not recreated in lab grown diamonds. If a red diamond has fluorescence, it will not add or detract from its value or resale value in any way.

== Red diamonds as investment ==
Owing to their 6 to 7 figure price range, red diamonds are generally purchased by diamond investors or collectors, for the purposes of resale at a later date or to complete a diamond collection, according to the Diamond Investment & Intelligence Center. Both investors and collectors only choose natural red diamonds for this purpose, as synthetic or color treated diamonds are essentially valueless. In the United States, when a buyer is seriously interested in the purchase of a very expensive diamond, they will often ask for the diamond to be examined by the Gemological Institute of America (GIA) to ascertain that it is genuine.

Of all the diamonds, red diamonds are the only ones whose size of under 1 carat will not disqualify them from being an investment stone, since so few red diamonds larger than that can be found in the market. Red is not a commonly synthesized diamond color, as it does not usually appeal to the general mass of diamond consumers.

== Red diamond source mines ==
The majority of red diamonds that are mined each year come from the Argyle diamond mine in Kimberley, Western Australia. However, they have also been discovered in Brazil, Russia, and certain African countries. The first red diamond known to public record was acquired in 1956 by a Montana rancher named Warren Hancock, who later sold it for a record setting $927,000 at auction in 1987. Other diamonds of note, such as the Moussaieff Red and the Kazanjian Red Diamond are known to have originated in Brazil and South Africa, respectively. Generally speaking, red diamonds are found in the same locations where pink diamonds have also been discovered, and are not found if there are no pink diamonds nearby. Since the majority of the world's pink diamonds are discovered in the Argyle Mine, it follows that the majority of red diamonds are discovered there as well, although this is not exclusively the case. However, if a red diamond is traced to the Argyle mine in origin, it lends additional value to the diamond's price as is the case with all Argyle diamonds.

== Notable red diamonds ==
Red Diamond	Weight (carat)	Notability
Moussaieff Red Diamond	5.11	Largest red diamond in the world, discovered in the 1990s by a Brazilian farmer in the Abaetezinho River
Kazanjian Red Diamond	5.05	Second largest red diamond in the world
DeYoung Red Diamond	5.03	Acquired at an estate sale by Sydney de Young where it was sold as a garnet hat pin
Graff Purplish-Red Diamond	2.26	A modified octagonal-cut mounted in a pink-gold ring. Sold for $2.65 million at auction in 2007.
Argyle Everglow	2.11	Graded as fancy red, mined from Argyle diamond mine.
Argyle Enigma	1.75	Fancy red radiant cut diamond from Argyle diamond mine, sold at Argyle's 2019 tender.
Hancock Red	0.95	Mined in Brazil. Purchased by Montana rancher Warren Hancock in the 1950s and sold for a 6500% profit in 1987.
Rob Red	0.59	The purest red diamond measured visually and instrumentally to date in the world.

== See also ==
- Diamonds as an investment
- List of diamonds
- Blue diamond
- Brown diamond
- Pink diamond
