= Flying Squad =

Metropolitan Police Service detective unit

- Active: 1918 – Present
- Country: United Kingdom
- Agency: Metropolitan Police Service
- Type: Detective Unit
- Part of: Central Specialist Crime

The Flying Squad is part of Central Specialist Crime within the Metropolitan Police. It has also previously been known as the Robbery Squad (since its primary purpose is to investigate robberies), Specialist Crime Directorate 7, SC&O7 and SO7. It is nicknamed The Sweeney, an abbreviation of the Cockney rhyming slang "Sweeney Todd" (rhyming "squad" with "todd"), or the Heavy Mob. The Flying Squad are an elite team of covert officers, who specialise in armed surveillance and ambush. The Squad’s primary purpose is the investigation of Serious Organised Acquisitive Crime (SOAC) concerning the robbery of cash in transit companies, banks and building societies. Perhaps the most dangerous part of the Squad's work today is the 'pavement ambush', where armed robbers are arrested in the act of committing a crime. The Squad are also responsible for providing the Metropolitan Police’s on-call response to kidnaps in action in London.

== Etymology ==
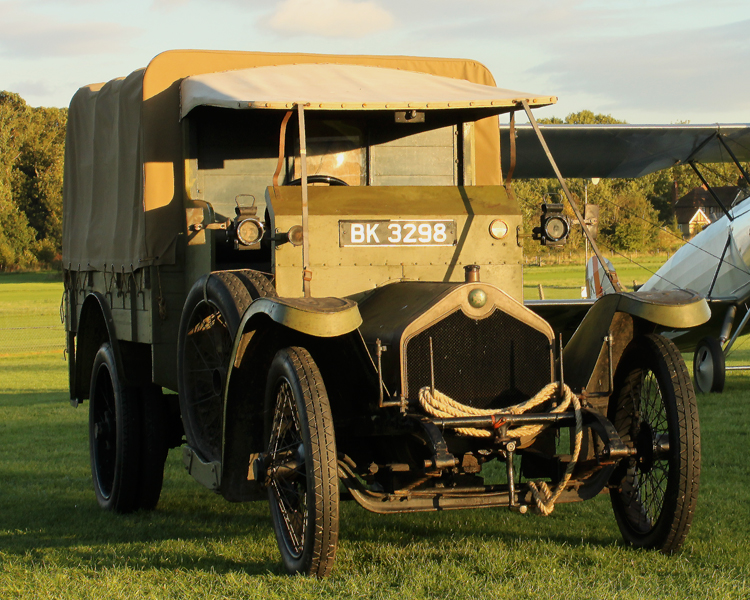
Crossley 20/25 Tender (1919)

Its name is thought to arise either from its permission to cross divisional boundaries or from its first vehicles, which were refurbished Crossley Motors 20/25 type tenders previously used by the Royal Flying Corps, which were supplied to the Metropolitan Police in 1920.

== History ==
The Squad was originally formed on an experimental basis by Detective Chief Inspector Frederick Wensley. In October 1919, Wensley summoned 12 detectives to Scotland Yard to form the squad. The group was initially named the Mobile Patrol Experiment and its original orders were to perform surveillance and gather intelligence on known robbers and pickpockets, using a horse-drawn carriage with covert holes cut into the canvas.

In 1920, it was officially reorganised under the authority of then Commissioner Nevil Macready. Headed by Detective Inspector Walter Hambrook, the squad was composed of 12 detective officers, including Irish-born Jeremiah Lynch (1888–1953), who had earned a fearsome reputation for tracking wartime German spies and for building up the case against confidence trickster Horatio Bottomley. The Mobile Patrol Experiment was given authorisation to carry out duties anywhere in the Metropolitan Police District. Throughout the 1920s, the squad was standardised and expanded, and the establishment was expanded to 40 officers, under the command of Detective Chief Inspector Fred "Nutty" Sharpe until his retirement in July 1937.

In 1948, the Squad was given the designation of C.O.(C.8) for Commissioner's Office Crime 8 and was augmented. In July that year, it learned of a plan to steal £750,000 (over £30 million in 2026) of bullion, jewellery and other valuables from the BOAC (British Overseas Airways Corporation) secure warehouse at Heathrow Airport by drugging the guards. Squad officers replaced the guards and pretended to be drugged, with other officers stationed around the warehouse. When the thieves removed the keys to the safe from Detective Sergeant Charles Hewett, the Squad announced its presence and a violent struggle ensued with many on both sides suffering serious injuries. The nine offenders received a total of 71 years' imprisonment for what became known as the Battle of London Airport.

By 1956 the Squad made one thousand arrests per year for the first time. In the 1960s it undertook the role of capturing and gathering evidence against the Kray twins, with many officers giving evidence in court. The Squad took up investigating the Great Train Robbery, which had no firearms involved, but did not catch all of the robbers.

From 1978 to 1981 the name was changed to the Central Robbery Squad, but still known as the Flying Squad. This was the era in which the Squad's close ties with the criminal fraternity, which had always been a necessary part of its strategy, were being exposed to public criticism. A number of scandals involving bribery and corruption were revealed, and on 7 July 1977, the Squad's commander, Detective Chief Superintendent Kenneth Drury, was convicted on five counts of corruption and imprisoned for eight years. Twelve other officers were also convicted and many more resigned. These and other scandals led to a massive internal investigation by the Dorset Constabulary into the Metropolitan Police Service and the City of London Police, codenamed Operation Countryman.

On 26 November 1983, £26 million worth of gold bullion, diamonds, and cash was stolen from the Brink's-Mat depot, on a trading estate near Heathrow Airport in West London. Flying Squad officers were involved extensively in the investigations which followed to attempt to trace, arrest and convict the gang members involved and their associates. Some of the most dangerous work undertaken by the Flying Squad is the "pavement ambush", where police ambush armed robbers during an offence. During Operation Char in 1987, and Operation Yamoto in November 1990, this approach led to three armed robbers being shot dead by police.

== Notable investigations (1990–present) ==
- In August 1993, an armed robbery occurred at a Barclays Bank in Blackfen in south-east London. This made the headlines as being the first time police were fired upon by a machine gun in mainland Britain; one officer was struck in the head by a ricochet and received the George Medal. The two robbers were later arrested and sentenced at the Old Bailey.
- In November 2000, five men set out to rob the Millennium Dome of the flawless 203.04-carat (40.608 g) Millennium Star, valued at over £200 million. Originally, police were unsure of the intended location of the robbery, but after months of surveillance, it was realised that the target was the Millennium Dome. On 7 November, the robbers armed with smoke bombs, ammonia and a nail gun, crashed into the dome with a stolen JCB excavator and smashed through to the vault. The robbers planned to escape on the River Thames by using a speedboat. The police operation to catch the robbers was codenamed Operation Magician, and involved 200 officers, including 40 specialist firearms officers (SFOs) from SCO19. Some of the officers were positioned behind a dummy wall, and others were dressed as cleaners with their firearms hidden in black bin bags or in rubbish bins, along with officers in Dome staff uniforms. A further 60 armed Flying Squad officers were stationed around the Thames, and 20 on the river itself, to hamper any escape attempts. The five men were caught and sentenced on various robbery charges. Detective Superintendent Jon Shatford was in command of the operation.
- On 17 May 2004, a robbery at the Heathrow Airport Swissport warehouse was foiled by officers from the Flying Squad and the Metropolitan Police, as the robbers attempted to steal gold and cash potentially worth £80 million. Each of the eight gang members later received prison sentences of between 6 and 13 years.
- On 13 September 2007, the Flying Squad was involved in an incident outside a bank in the village of Chandler's Ford, near Southampton. Two suspected armed robbers were shot dead by members of SCO19, in support of a Flying Squad operation, who had been lying in wait after receiving a tip off that an armed robbery was imminent. The thieves were attempting armed robbery on a G4S security van outside the HSBC branch when they were killed by the SCO19 SFOs.
- In April 2015 the Hatton Garden safe deposit burglary, involving a group of ten men nicknamed the "Diamond Wheezers," broke into a safe deposit vault in Hatton Garden, using a drill to cut through the walls and steal an estimated £14 million worth of jewels and gold. The Flying Squad investigated the heist, with nine men eventually sentenced for their involvement.

== In popular culture ==
The Flying Squad's work was dramatised in the 1970s British television series The Sweeney, and two theatrically released feature film spin-offs, Sweeney! and Sweeney 2, starring John Thaw and Dennis Waterman. A further film adaptation, The Sweeney starring Ray Winstone, was released in 2012.

The Monty Python sketch "Argument Clinic" featured "Inspector Fox of the Light Entertainment Police, Comedy Division, Special Flying Squad", and "Inspector Thompson's Gazelle of the Programme Planning Police, Light Entertainment Division, Special Flying Squad."

In an episode of the Thin Blue Line, Inspector Fowler expresses displeasure at the idea of the Flying Squad using his station for an investigation on the grounds that their members urinate inaccurately. It was also depicted in television shows Thief Takers in the 1990s and The Gold in the 2020s.

The main protagonist in the second half of 2002 PlayStation 2 video game The Getaway is Frank Carter, a member of the Flying Squad.

A three-part Netflix documentary film executive-produced by Guy Ritchie in 2025, The Diamond Heist, details the Squad’s Operation Magician in catching those involved in the failed 2000 Millennium Dome diamond heist.

== See also ==
- Bent Coppers, 2003 book detailing police corruption within the Flying Squad
