= DeYoung Red Diamond =

Third-largest red diamond in the world

Coordinates: 38°53′27.2″N 77°01′32.2″W

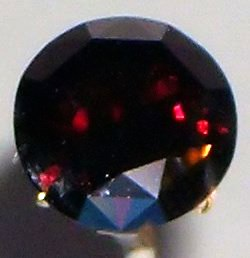
- DeYoung Red Diamond
- Weight: 5.03 carats (1.006 g)
- Color: Deep red with slight brown tint
- Cut: Modified round brilliant
- Owner: Smithsonian Institution
- Estimated value: USD$5 million or lower

The DeYoung Red Diamond is a 5.03-carat unmounted rare red diamond. It is the third-largest red diamond in the world, and the only one on public display. Sydney DeYoung (for whom the diamond is named) obtained the diamond, which was mistaken for a garnet, at a flea market. The diamond was given to the Smithsonian Institution after DeYoung's death in 1986.

== Description ==
The DeYoung Red Diamond is a 5.03-carat unmounted diamond. It is a deep red color, with a slight tint of brown. Red diamonds are the rarest type of colored diamonds. The diamond is a modified round brilliant cut. The facets on the diamond's crown, which resemble kites, are split in two horizontally. This feature makes the DeYoung diamond more brilliant than other diamonds with an ordinary round brilliant cut. The DeYoung Red Diamond is the third-largest red diamond, behind only the 5.05-carat Kazanjian Red Diamond (second-largest) and the 5.11-carat Moussaieff Red Diamond (largest). Its clarity grade is VS-2 (Very Slightly Included). The diamond is a Type IIa diamond, meaning that it does not have any chemical impurities. Type IIa diamonds comprise only 1–2% of all naturally occurring diamonds.

== Ownership ==
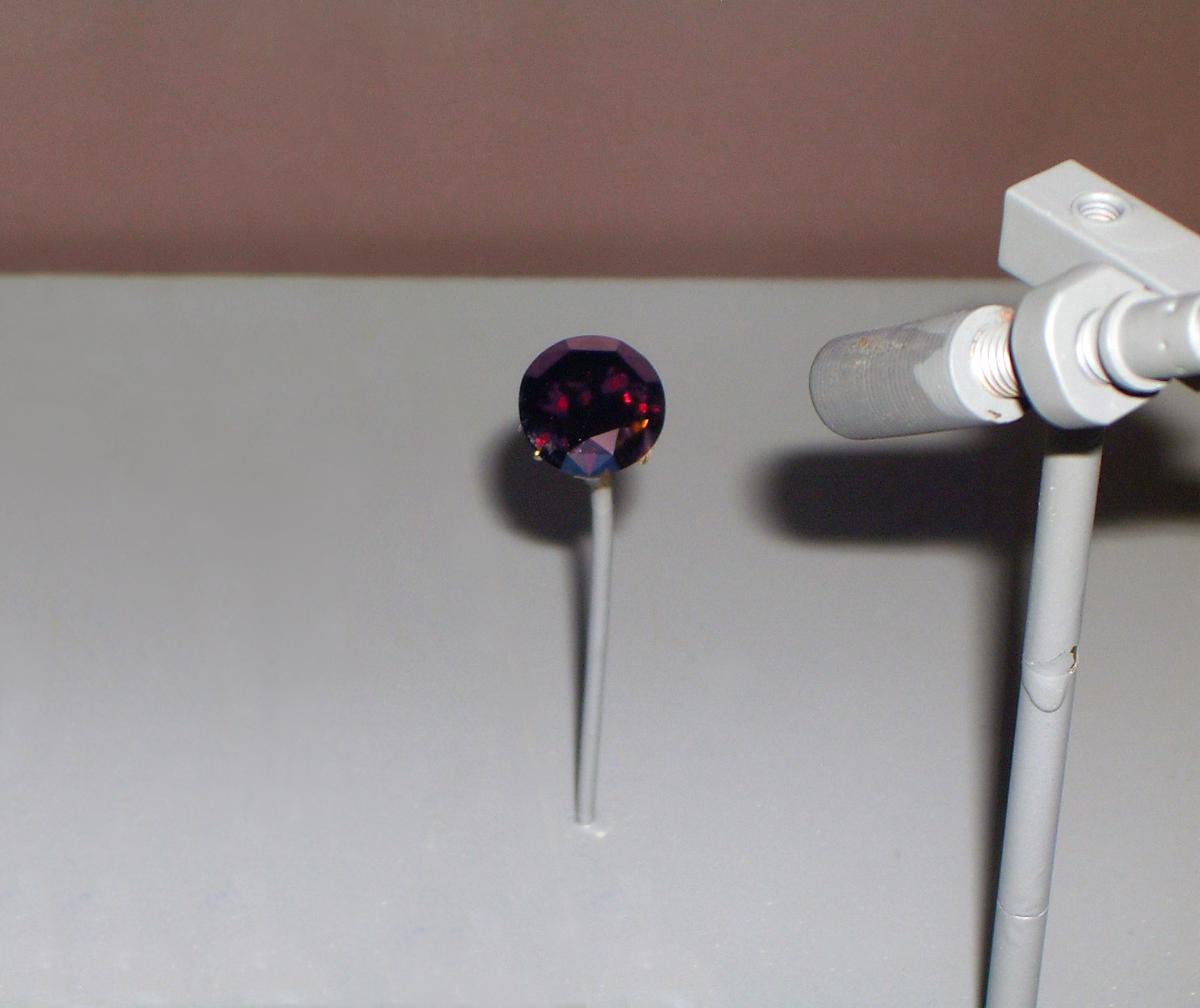
The DeYoung Red Diamond on display

The diamond was purchased at a flea market by Sydney DeYoung (1897–1986), a Boston jewelry seller. The diamond, which was mistaken for a garnet, was on a hatpin being sold as part of an estate jewelry collection. Upon later examining the stone, however, DeYoung noted that it was of unusually high quality for its age and did not have the appearance of a garnet. He had it tested at a gem-testing laboratory, and it was discovered that the stone was actually a red diamond.

After DeYoung's death in 1986, the diamond was given to the Smithsonian Institution's National Gem and Mineral Collection, a part of the National Museum of Natural History, in accordance with DeYoung's wishes. The Smithsonian received the diamond in 1987; it was mailed to the Smithsonian uninsured in an ordinary box. The diamond, which is protected by bulletproof glass in the Hall of Gems, is the only red diamond on public display; all the others are privately owned. Another diamond given by DeYoung in 1962, a 2.90-carat pear-shaped pink diamond obtained from Williamson mine in Tanzania, is displayed alongside the red diamond.

== See also ==
- List of diamonds
