= Ocean Dream =

Ocean Dream may refer to:

- Ocean Dream (1972 ship), a former cruise ship, launched in 1972 and originally known as the Spirit of London
- Ocean Dream (1982 ship), currently an Australian cruise ship, launched in 1982
- Ocean Dream Diamond, 5.51ct blue-green diamond
- One Piece: Ocean's Dream, a One Piece video game
