= Scarselli Diamonds =

Multinational coloured diamond & jewelry retailer

- Industry: Diamonds
- Founded: 1957
- Founder: Gateano (Nino) Scarselli
- Headquarters: New York City, United States
- Area served: Worldwide
- Key people: Gaetano Scarselli; Bruno Scarselli; Davide Scarselli
- Products: Colored diamonds; Gemstones
- Number of employees: 20
- Website: http://www.scarselli.com

Scarselli Diamonds is a multinational retailer of colored diamonds, color diamond jewelry, and rare gemstones. The company was founded in Italy in 1957 and moved its operations to the US in 1978. Scarselli Diamonds trades in natural colored diamonds, the majority of which are yellow, pink, red, or blue, in addition to colorless diamonds. They also sell other gemstones including emeralds, sapphires, and rubies.

The company's head office operates out of New York City, and they have main offices in Hong Kong, Shanghai, and Shenzhen. Scarselli Diamonds was among the first diamond companies to have a diamond collection admitted to a museum.

The company owned the Aurora Green Diamond, the largest vivid green diamond to ever sell at auction, sold by Christie's in May 2016 for US$16.8 million, $3.3 million per carat, to Chinese jewelry company Chow Tai Fook.
