= Aurora Green Diamond =

- Weight: 5.03 carats (1.006 g)
- Color: Fancy Vivid Green
- Cut: Cut-Cornered Rectangular Modified Brilliant
- Country of origin: Brazil
- Original owner: Scarselli Diamonds
- Owner: Chow Tai Fook
- Estimated value: US$16.8 million (May 2016)

The Aurora Green Diamond is a 5.03-carat (1.006 g) vivid green diamond with VS2 clarity. In May 2016, the Aurora Green became the largest vivid green diamond to ever sell at auction. The record was previous held by a 2.54 carat Fancy Vivid Green VS1 diamond that was sold by Sotheby’s on November 17, 2009, for $1.22 million per carat according to the Diamond Investment & Intelligence Center. On May 31, 2016, the diamond, which was originally owned by Scarselli Diamonds was sold by Christie's for a record price per carat of $3.3 million to Chinese jewelry company Chow Tai Fook, totaling $16.8 million.

== Records ==
As of 2016, Aurora Green Diamond is:

- The largest Fancy Vivid Green Diamond ever to be offered at auction.
- The most expensive Green Diamond in the world to be sold at auction.
- The highest per carat price ever sold for any Green Diamond in the world at auction.
- The most expensive Green Diamond to be sold in Asia.

== See also ==
- List of diamonds
