= Ocean Paradise Diamond =

Ocean Paradise
- Weight: 1.6 carats (0.32 g)
- Color: Fancy Green Blue
- Cut: Oval brilliant
- Country of origin: Brazil
- Mine of origin: unknown
- Discovered: 2012
- Owner: Nahshonov Group
- Estimated value: unknown

The Ocean Paradise is a diamond measuring 1.6 carats (0.32 g) after polish and was discovered in Brazil and currently owned by the Nahshonov Group. When discovered, it measured 6.43 carats (1.29 g). The Ocean Paradise is the second and one of the only natural diamonds known to the GIA to possess a blue-green hue (the first being the Ocean Dream Diamond owned by the Cora Diamond Corp., found in Central Africa), making it one of the rarest diamonds in the world.

== Classification ==
The color classification of the Ocean Paradise has been debated by various institutions. The Fancy classification was initially debated by the DHG Gemological Laboratory and the Gemmological Center of Moscow State University. The Ocean Paradise was rated in color as Fancy Greenish Blue by Moscow State University and Fancy Green Blue by DHG. (A blue-green colour is commonly seen in artificially enhanced diamonds, whose colour is imparted by various irradiation methods.) Both institutions have determined that the Ocean Paradise is oval shaped and has a clarity grade of VS2.

== Discovery ==
The Ocean Paradise was discovered in Diamantina, Minas Gerais, Brazil in 2012.

== Value ==
The Ocean Paradise is currently valued at $2.67 million according to the Gemological Institute of America, while its sister the Ocean Dream is valued at over $10 million.

== See also ==
- List of diamonds
- Ocean Dream Diamond
