= William Goldberg (diamond dealer) =

William Goldberg (March 19, 1925 – October 20, 2003) was an American diamond dealer and the founder of the William Goldberg Diamond Corporation.

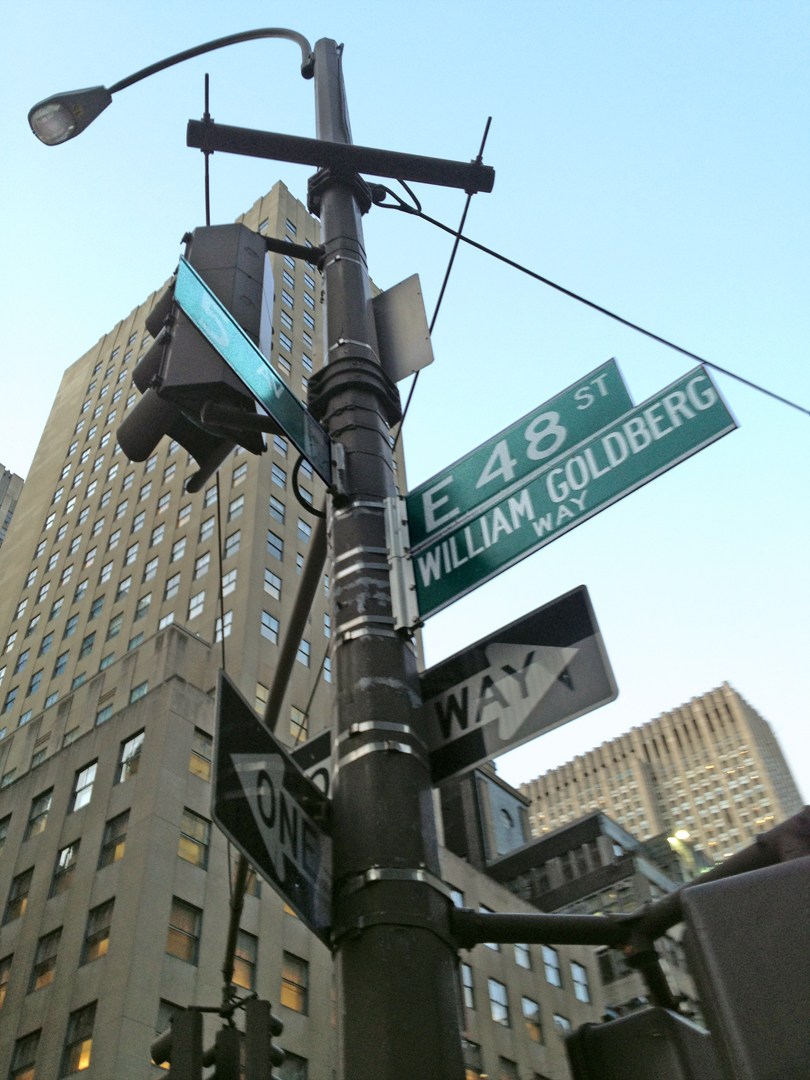
The corner of 5th Avenue and 48th Street in Manhattan, designated by the City of New York as "William Goldberg Way"

Goldberg was born in Brooklyn, New York City. He started cutting diamonds in 1948, but he found that his aptitude lay with buying and selling diamonds rather than cutting them. In 1952, he founded Goldberg & Weiss with diamond cutter Irving Weiss. In 1973, he formed the William Goldberg Diamond Corporation, located in New York City's Diamond District. In 1978, he became president of the New York Diamond Dealers Club and served three terms.

He traded well known diamonds including the Queen of Holland diamond, the Premier Rose diamond, the Red Shield diamond, and the Pumpkin diamond.

He died of pancreatic cancer, aged 77. Following his death, members of Goldberg's family created the William Goldberg Endowed Scholarship Fund at the Gemological Institute of America. In 2006 the City of New York named the block of 48th Street between Fifth and Madison Avenues "William Goldberg Way".
