= Millennium Dome =

Original name of a large dome-shaped building in South East London, England

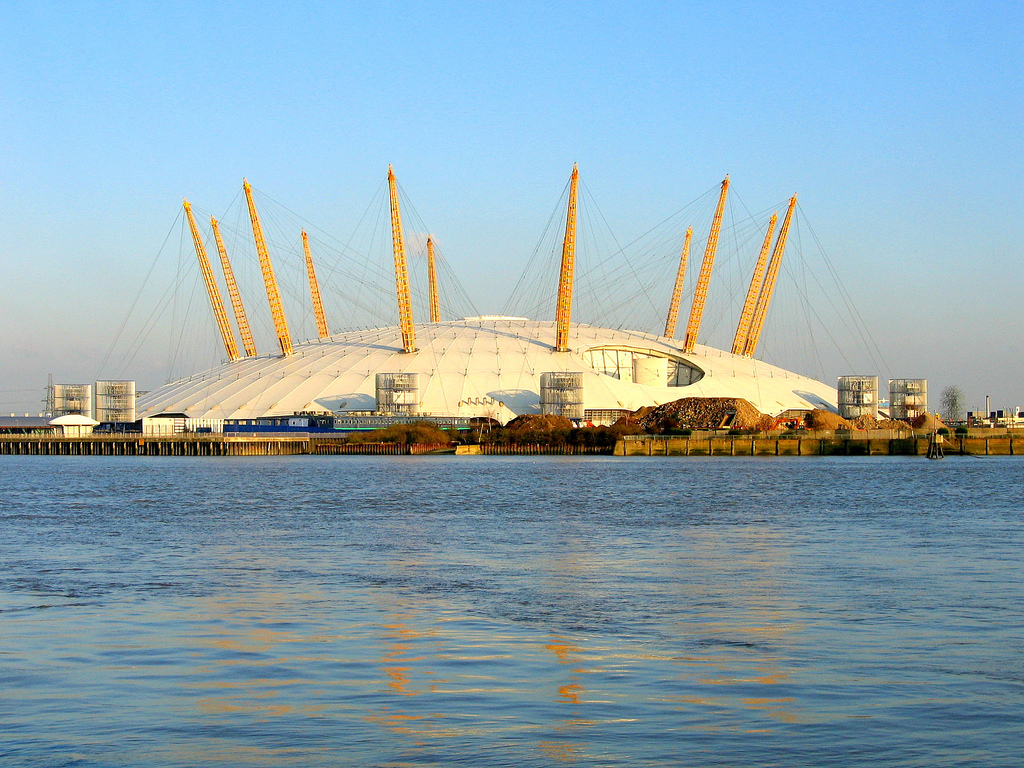
- Millennium Dome in 2004

General information
- Type: Exhibition space
- Architectural style: Dome
- Location: Greenwich Peninsula; London, SE10; United Kingdom
- Coordinates: 51°30′10″N 0°0′11″E
- Current status: Converted into The O2 Arena
- Completed: 1999
- Opening: 31 December 1999; 26 years ago
- Closed: 31 December 2000; 25 years ago
- Cost: £789 million (£1.51 billion in 2025 pounds)

Technical details
- Structural system: Steel, tensioned fabric

Design and construction
- Architect: Richard Rogers
- Structural engineer: BuroHappold Engineering
- Services engineer: BuroHappold Engineering
- Awards: Royal Academy of Engineering; MacRobert Award

The Millennium Dome was the original name of the large dome-shaped building on the Greenwich Peninsula in South East London, England, which housed a major exhibition celebrating the beginning of the third millennium. When opened in 1999, it was the fifth largest building in the world by usable volume. The exhibition was open to the public from 1 January to 31 December 2000. The project and exhibition were highly contentious and attracted barely half of the 12 million customers its sponsors forecasted, and so were deemed a failure by the press. All the original exhibition elements were sold or dismantled.

In a 2005 report, the cost of the Dome and surrounding land (which increased to 170 acres from the initial offering of the 48 acres enclosed by the Dome) and managing the Dome until the deal was closed was £28.7 million. The value of the 48 acres occupied by the Dome was estimated at £48 million, which could have been realised by demolishing the structure, but it was considered preferable to preserve the Dome. The structure itself still exists and serves as the exterior to The O2 entertainment complex, which includes the O2 Arena.

The Prime Meridian passes the western edge of the Dome and the nearest London Underground station is North Greenwich on the Jubilee line.

== Architecture ==
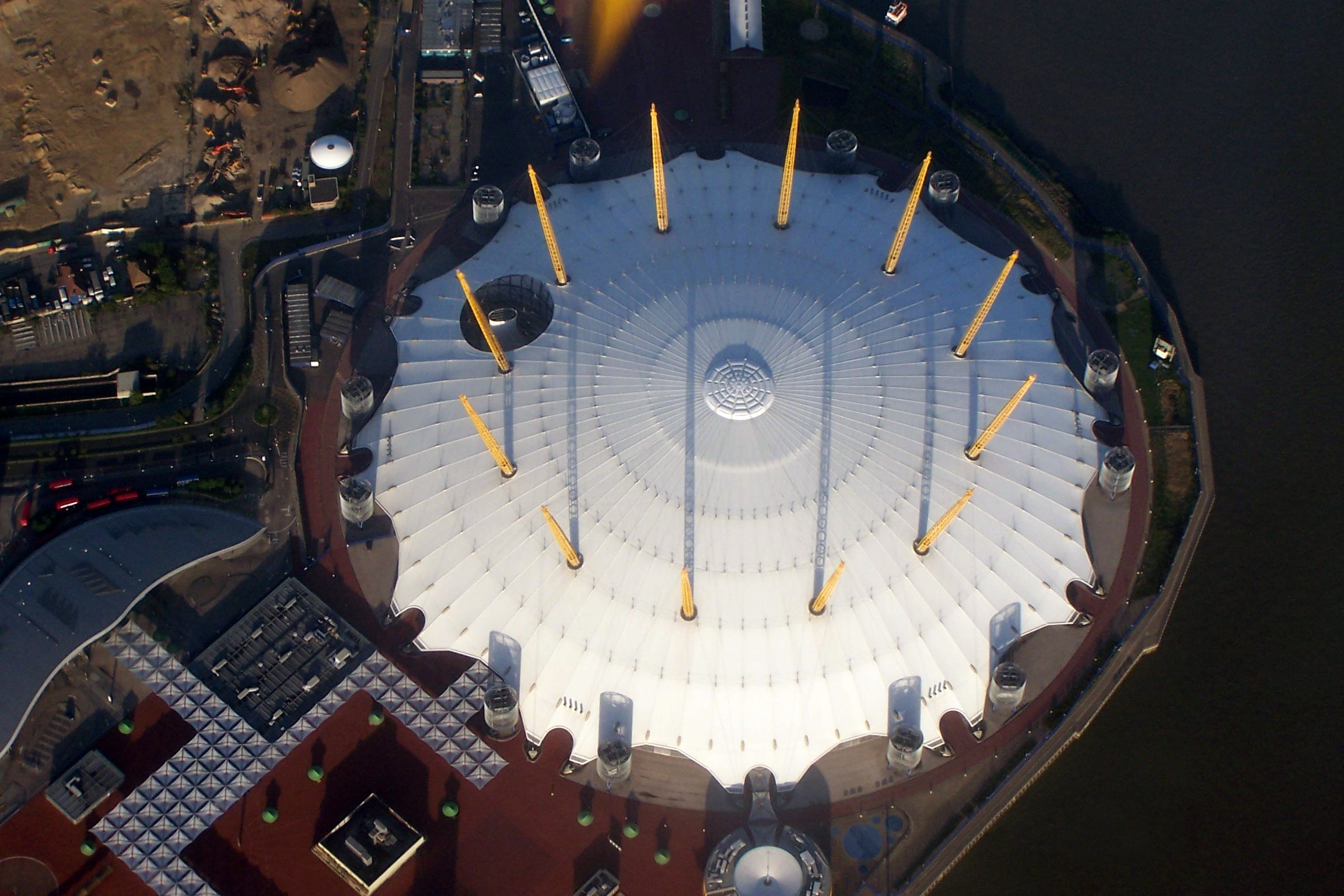
The dome, seen from above

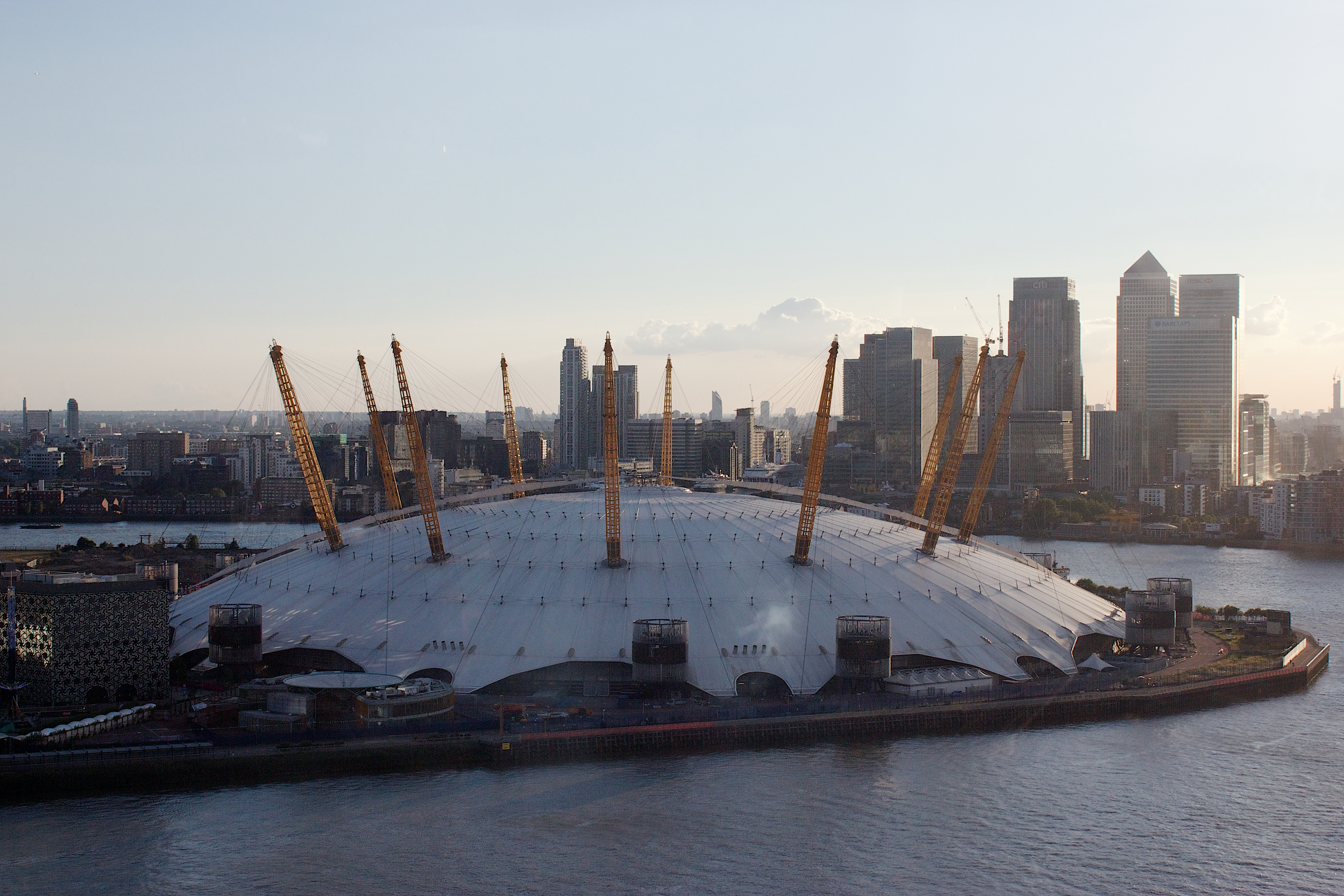
The dome, seen from the London Cable Car, with Canary Wharf in the background.

The dome is one of the largest of its type in the world. Externally, it appears as a large white marquee with twelve 100-metre-high (330 ft) yellow support towers, one for each month of the year, or each hour of the clock face, representing the role played by Greenwich Mean Time. In plan view it is circular, 365 metres (1,200 ft) (one metre or 39 inches for each day in a standard year) in diameter. It has become one of the United Kingdom's most recognisable landmarks, and can be easily identified on satellite images of London.

The architect was Richard Rogers and the contractor was a joint venture company, McAlpine/Laing Joint Venture (MLJV) formed between Sir Robert McAlpine and Laing Management. The building structure was engineered by Buro Happold, and the entire roof structure weighs less than the air contained within the building. Although referred to as a dome it is "not a dome in the structural sense [...] In this building, a dome-shaped cable network is supported on a ring of [...] masts". It has been disparagingly referred to as the Millennium Tent.

The canopy is 52 metres (170 ft) high in the middle – one metre (3.3 ft) for each week of the year and is made of durable and weather-resistant PTFE-coated glass fibre fabric panels (original plans to use PVC-coated polyester fabric were dropped after protest led by Greenpeace), with each of the 72 segments containing two panels. Its symmetry is interrupted by a hole through which a ventilation shaft from the Blackwall Tunnel rises. Six segments were destroyed during Storm Eunice on 18 February 2022.

Built in 15 months, the dome structure was delivered under budget, at a cost of £43m.

The critic Jonathan Meades has scathingly referred to the Millennium Dome as a "Museum of Toxic Waste", and apart from the dome itself, the project included the reclamation of the entire Greenwich Peninsula. The land was previously derelict and contaminated by toxic sludge from East Greenwich Gas Works that operated from 1889 to 1985. The clean-up operation was seen by the then Deputy Prime Minister Michael Heseltine as an investment that would add a large area of useful land to the crowded capital.

== Background to the Dome project ==
The Dome project was conceived, originally on a somewhat smaller scale, under John Major's Conservative government, as a Festival of Britain or World's Fair-type showcase to celebrate the third millennium. The incoming Labour government elected in 1997 under Tony Blair greatly expanded the size, scope and funding of the project, and construction began in June 1997. Construction of the dome was largely funded through a £399 million grant from the National Lottery Distribution Fund, with additional capital raised in the form of sponsorship for exhibits within the dome, including a reported £12 million from aerospace firm BAE Systems.

Just before its opening Blair claimed the Dome would be "a triumph of confidence over cynicism, boldness over blandness, excellence over mediocrity". In the words of BBC correspondent Robert Orchard, "the Dome was to be highlighted as a glittering New Labour achievement in the next election manifesto", but criticised in the 2001 Conservative Party manifesto as "banal, anonymous and rootless", and lacking "a sense of Britain's history or culture". Following the death of Diana, Princess of Wales, a member of the Dome's board suggested the project be refashioned and extended "to accommodate, for example, a hospital, businesses, charities, private residences, and the whole thing named 'the Princess Diana Centre'". The idea was later scrapped.

Before its opening, the Dome was excoriated in Iain Sinclair's diatribe, Sorry Meniscus – Excursions to the Millennium Dome (Profile Books: London 1999, ISBN 1-86197-179-6), which forecast the hype, the associated political posturing, and the eventual disillusion. The post-exhibition plan had been to convert the Dome into a European football stadium which would last for 25 years: Charlton Athletic at one point considered a possible move but instead chose to redevelop their own stadium. Local team Fisher Athletic were at one time interested in moving to the Dome, but they were considered to have too small a fan base to make this feasible. The Dome was planned to take over the functions performed by the London Arena after its closure. This is the function which The O2 Arena has now undertaken.

== Millennium Experience ==
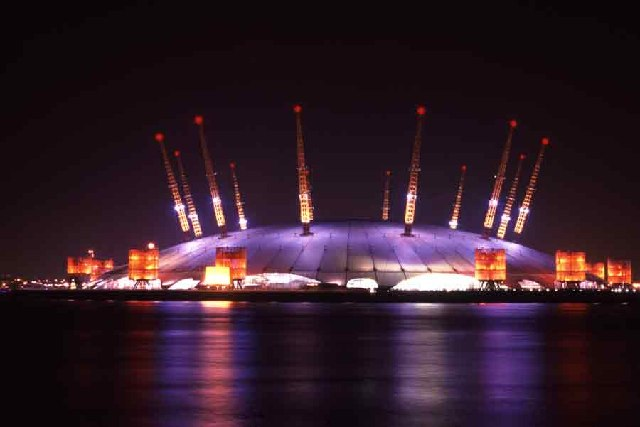
The Millennium Dome at night, September 2000

After a private opening on the evening of 31 December 1999, including a New Year's Eve celebration attended by Queen Elizabeth II, the Millennium Experience at the Dome was open to the public for the whole of 2000, and contained a large number of attractions and exhibits.

=== Millennium Dome Show ===
The English musician Peter Gabriel issued in 2000 The Story of OVO which was released in a CD-booklet-shaped comic book as part of the CD edition with the title "OVO The Millennium Show". The story of the 2000 Millennium Dome Show based on it. The show opened on 1 January 2000 and was performed 999 times before closing on 31 December of that year.

=== Exhibits ===
The interior space was subdivided into 14 zones: "Who We Are" (Body, Faith, Mind and Self-Portrait), "What We Do" (Work, Learning, Rest, Play, Talk, Money and Journey) and "Where We Live" (Shared Ground, Living Island and Home Planet).

Surrounded by the zones was a performance area in the centre of the dome. With music composed by Peter Gabriel and an acrobatic cast of 160, the Millennium Dome Show was performed 999 times over the course of the year. Throughout the year, the specially-commissioned film Blackadder: Back & Forth was shown in Skyscape (a separate cinema on the site sponsored by BSkyB). There was also the McDonald's Our Town Story project in which each Local Education Authority in the UK was invited to perform a show of their devising which characterised their area and its people.

As well as the above, the first ever series of Techno Games was filmed there and shown on BBC Two the same year.

=== Other attractions ===
There were a number of other attractions both in and outside of The Dome. Inside the Dome there was a play area named Timekeepers of the Millennium (featuring the characters Coggsley and Sprinx), The Millennium Coin Minting Press in association with the Royal Mint, the 1951 Festival of Britain Bus, and the Millennium Star Jewels (focus of the failed Millennium Diamond heist.) Outside was the Millennium Map (thirteen metres; 43' high), the Childhood Cube, Looking Around (a hidden installation), Greenwich Pavilion, the Hanging Gardens at the front of the Dome, as well as a number of other art installations and sculptures.

Two of the remaining art installations form the start of The Line, a modern art trail connecting the O2 to the Queen Elizabeth Olympic Park.

=== Financial and management problems ===
At worst it is a millennial metaphor for the twentieth century. An age in which all things, like the Dome itself, became disposable. A century in which forest and cities, marriages, animal species, races, religions and even the Earth itself, became ephemeral. What more cynical monument can there be for this totalitarian cocksure fragile age than a vast temporary plastic bowl, erected from the aggregate contribution of the poor through the National Lottery. Despite the spin, it remains a massive pantheon to the human ego, the Ozymandias of its time.

— Bob Marshall-Andrews MP, Sunday Times 1 February 1998

The project was largely reported by the press to have been a failure. During 2000, the organisers repeatedly asked for, and received, more cash from the Millennium Commission, the Lottery body which supported it. There were numerous changes at management and board level, before and during the exhibition; Jennifer Page was sacked as chief executive of the New Millennium Experience Company just one month after the dome's opening. The project came to be seen as closely aligned with Tony Blair's New Labour, making its success or failure politically important. Part of the problem was that the financial predictions were based on an unrealistically high forecast of visitor numbers at 12 million. During the first year that it was open there were approximately 6.5 million visitors – significantly fewer than the approximately 10 million paying visitors that attended the Festival of Britain, which only ran from May to September. Empire Exhibition, Scotland 1938, held in Glasgow, attracted more than 12 million visitors, being open May to October. Unlike the press, visitor feedback was positive; as of August 2000, 87% of visitors said they were satisfied with their visit. It was the most popular admission-paying tourist attraction in 2000, with almost twice as many visitors as the second most visited attraction, Alton Towers.

According to the UK National Audit Office, the cost of The Dome at the liquidation of the New Millennium Experience Company in 2002 was £789 million, of which £628 million was covered by National Lottery grants and £189 million through sales of tickets etc. A surplus of £25 million over costs meant that the full lottery grant was not required. The £603 million of lottery money was still £204 million in excess of the original estimate of £399 million required, due to the shortfall in visitor numbers.

== Closure and sale of site ==
The government's difficulties in selling the site became the subject of much critical comment. The amount spent on maintaining the closed building was also criticised. Shortly after it had closed, Lord Falconer reported that The Dome was costing over £1 million per month to maintain.

Following closure of the Dome, some Zones were dismantled by the sponsoring organisations, but much of the content was auctioned or donated to Disney World. This included a number of artworks specially commissioned from contemporary British artists. A piece by Gavin Turk was sold for far below his auction price, though Turk stated that he did not think the piece had worked. The Timekeepers of the Millennium attraction was acquired by the Chessington World of Adventures theme park in Surrey. A unique record of the memorabilia and paraphernalia of the Millennium Experience is held by a private collector in the United States. Many of the fixtures and fittings were also purchased by Paul Scally, chairman of Gillingham F.C., for the club's stadium.

== Temporary reopenings ==
The Dome opened again during December 2003 for the Winter Wonderland 2003 experience. The event, which featured a large funfair, ice rink, and other attractions, culminated in a laser and firework display on New Year's Eve. It also served as the venue for a number of free music festivals organised by the Mayor of London under the "Respect" banner.

Over the 2004 Christmas period, part of the main dome was used as a shelter for the homeless and others in need, organised by the charity Crisis after superseding the London Arena, which had previously hosted the event. In 2005, when work began for the redevelopment of the Dome, the London Arena hosted the event again.

== Redevelopment and rebranding as The O2 ==
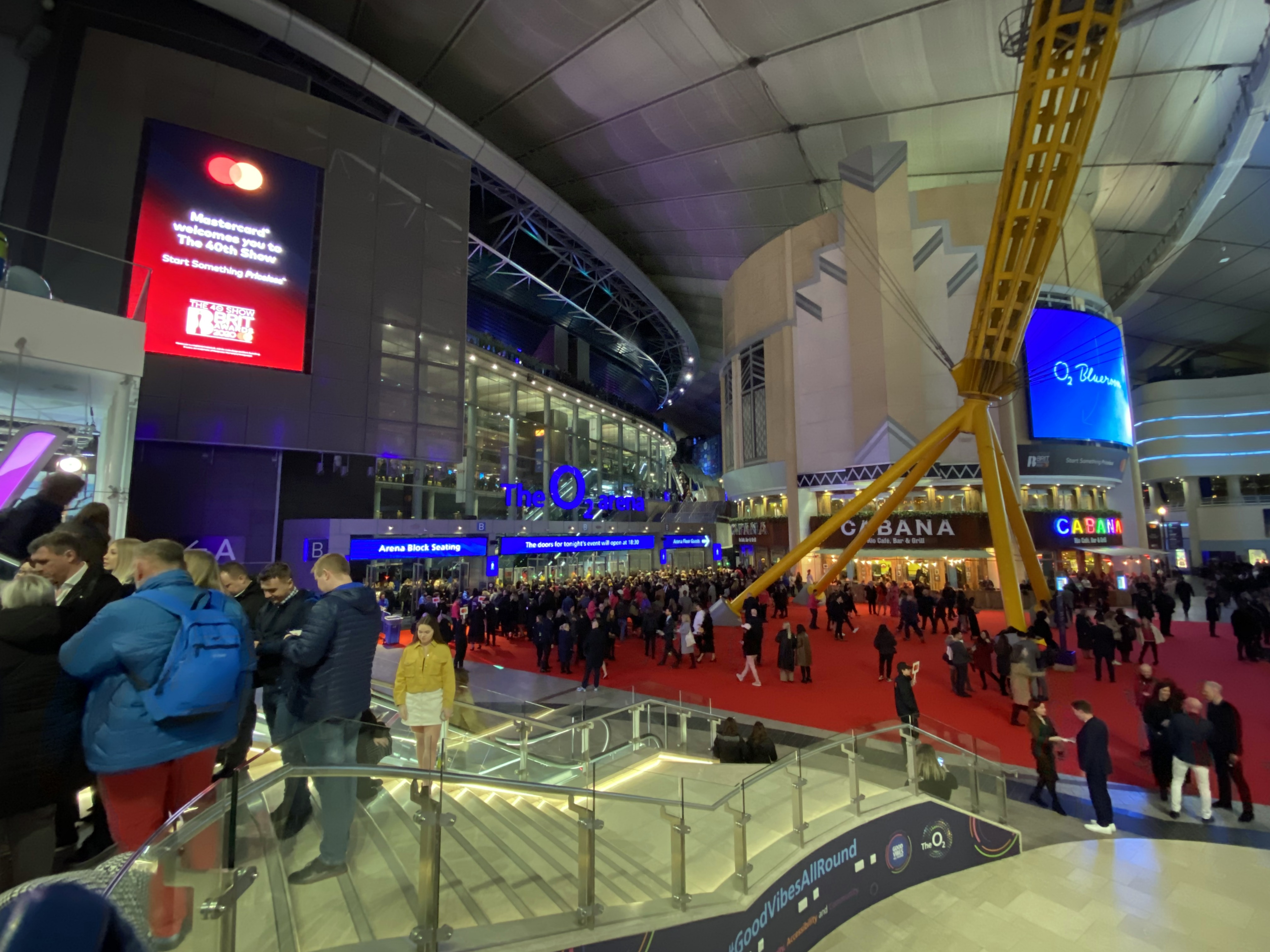
The entrance of the O2 Arena prior to the Brit Awards 2020

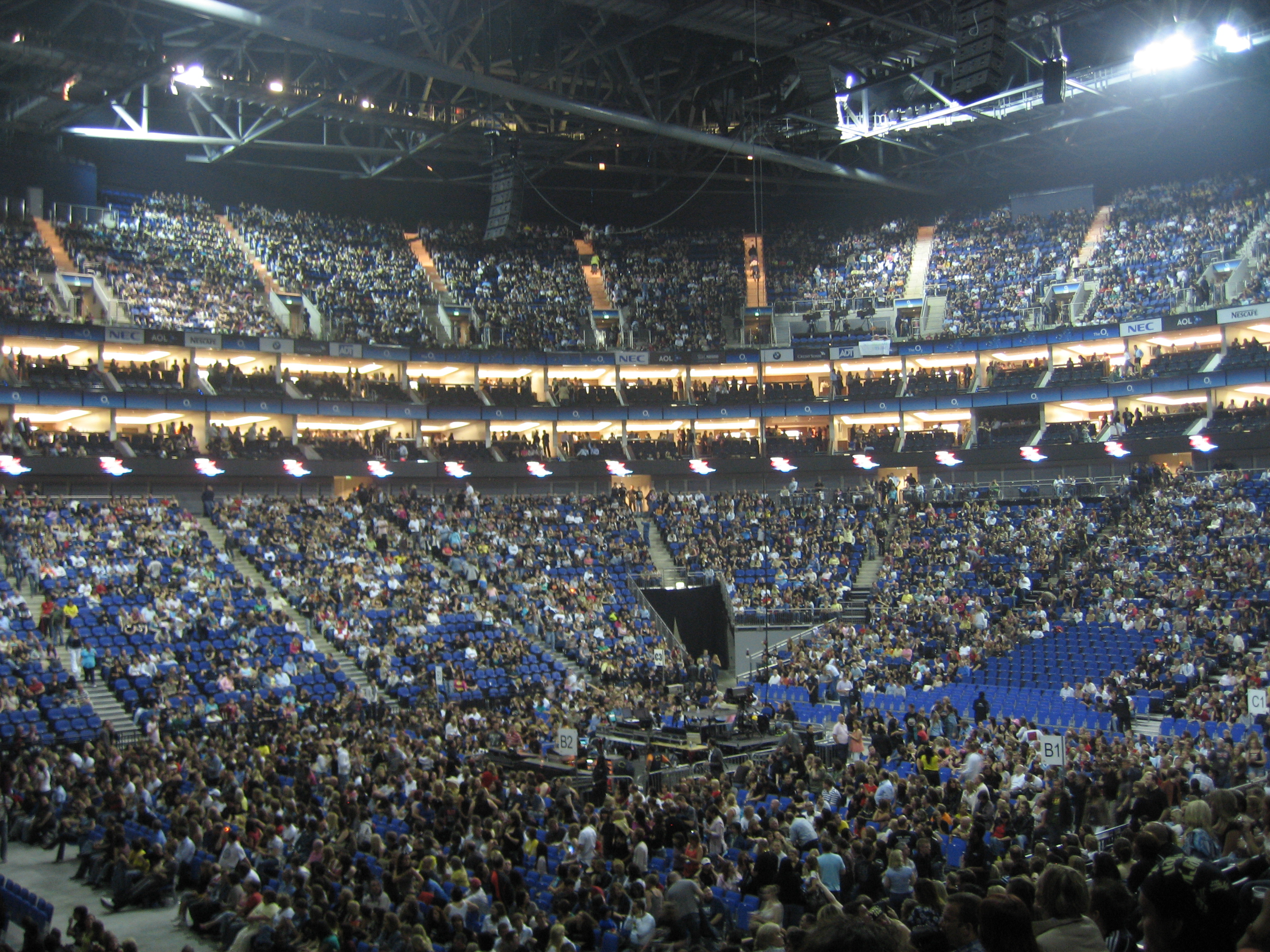
The interior of The O2 in 2007

By late 2000, a proposal had been made for a high-tech business park to be erected under the tent area, creating an "indoor city" complete with streets, parks, and buildings. The business park was actually the original 1996 proposal for the site of the peninsula before the plans for the Millennium Dome were proposed.

A suggestion was also made that the entire Dome be relocated to Swindon to serve as a research centre and extension of the Science Museum; this proposal only came to light when released by The National Archives in 2022.

In December 2001, it was announced that Meridian Delta Ltd had been chosen by the government to develop the Dome as a sports and entertainment centre, and to develop housing, shops and offices on 150 acres (0.61 km^{2}) of surrounding land. It also hoped to relocate some of London's tertiary education establishments to the site. Meridian Delta is backed by the American billionaire Philip Anschutz, who has interests in oil, railways, and telecommunications, as well as a string of sports-related investments.

A report in 2005 by the House of Commons Public Accounts Committee found that the cost of the process of selling the Dome and surrounding land (which increased to 170 acres from the initial offering of the 48 acres enclosed by the Dome) and managing the Dome until the deal was closed was £28.7 million. £33 million were expected to be returned to the taxpayer by 2009. The value of the 48 acres occupied by the Dome was estimated at £48 million, which could have been realised by demolishing the structure, but it was considered preferable to preserve the Dome.

The dome was publicly renamed as The O2 on 31 May 2005, in a £6 million-per-year deal with telecommunications company O2 plc, now a subsidiary of Telefónica Europe. This announcement, which presaged a major redevelopment of the site that retained little beyond the shell of the dome, gave publicity to the dome's transition into an entertainment district including an indoor arena, a music club, a cinema, an exhibition space and bars and restaurants. This redevelopment was undertaken by the dome's new owners, the Anschutz Entertainment Group, to a design by HOK SVE and Buro Happold. It cost £600 million, and the resulting venue opened to the public on 24 June 2007, with a concert by rock band Bon Jovi.

During the 2012 Summer Olympics, the artistic gymnastics events, along with the medal rounds of basketball, were held at The O2. It also held wheelchair basketball events during the 2012 Summer Paralympics. For sponsorship reasons, during those times the arena was temporarily renamed the North Greenwich Arena.

The O2 now contains multiple VR theme park rides, a trampoline park, and an attraction called "Up at The O2," offering guided climbs on the O2 arena.

== Effects on political careers ==
Issues related to the Dome damaged the political careers of government ministers Peter Mandelson and John Prescott. The scheme was seen as an early example of what some saw as Tony Blair's often excessive optimism, who stated at the Dome's opening: "In the Dome we have a creation that, I believe, will truly be a beacon to the world". The fact that Mandelson's grandfather was Herbert Morrison—who as a minister had been involved with the Festival of Britain—was often drawn on for negative comparisons.

== Chronology of the project ==
- 1994: Millennium Commission established by Prime Minister John Major and handed over to Deputy Prime Minister Michael Heseltine.
- 1 March 1995: chief executive Jennie Page appointed.
- 19 June 1996: Greenwich Peninsula site selected over Birmingham by the Millennium Commission. The Birmingham NEC, Pride Park in Derby and Bromley-by-Bow in East London were the other locations on the final short list.
- December 1996: Government decides to support the project with public money after being unable to raise private capital.
- 19 June 1997: New Prime Minister Tony Blair visits Greenwich to announce that the Millennium Dome has been saved. The decision was taken only after a difficult Cabinet debate which lasted for more than an hour.
- 20 June 1997: Tony Blair appointed Peter Mandelson to the role of Minister for the Millennium after his announcement that the beleaguered £580 million dome would go ahead.
- June 1997: Construction begins.
- 10 January 1998: Creative director Stephen Bayley quits the project. He is said to have been at "loggerheads" with Peter Mandelson as to who was in charge with the project.
- 23 December 1998: Peter Mandelson resigns from government after a financial scandal.
- 4 January 1999: Lord Falconer of Thoroton replaces Mandelson.
- May 1999: The Jubilee Line Extension opens, putting the Dome on the London Underground. This too is seen as disorderly, opening 14 months late and with station facilities not yet complete (e.g. lifts for wheelchair access).
- 22 June 1999: structure of Dome completed.
- 31 December 1999: the BBC Balloon is seen flying during "2000 Today" on BBC One, and used throughout 2000.
- 31 December 1999 and 1 January 2000: VIP guests are kept waiting outside for hours because of a ticketing problem.
- 1 January 2000: Dome structure opens to public as the Millennium Dome containing an exhibition to celebrate the third millennium.
- 5 February 2000: Chief executive Jennie Page sacked and replaced by Pierre-Yves Gerbeau.
- 26 July 2000: Culture, Media and Sport Select Committee publishes adverse report on Dome's management.
- 7 November 2000: Millennium Dome raid. Thieves break into the diamond exhibit during opening hours but are foiled by waiting police. Four men are jailed for the attempted robbery on 18 February 2002.
- 9 November 2000: National Audit Office publishes report blaming unrealistic attendance targets for the Dome's financial problems.
- 14 November 2000: Michael Heseltine (MP for Henley), the Dome's original political supporter, states "I have seen the inside story, and of course, with hindsight, all of us would do it differently".
- 31 December 2000: Dome closed to the public, having attracted just over six million visitors. The initial projected figure was twelve million.
- 27 February 2001 – 2 March 2001: One Amazing Auction Sale: Four-day public auction with 17,000 lots of Dome/NMEC items, managed by auctioneer Henry Butcher.
- 18 December 2001: Announcement of sale of site to Meridian Delta Ltd, who planned to turn it into a 20,000-seat sports and entertainment venue. Houses and offices to be built on the surrounding land, subject to the consent of the London Borough of Greenwich.
- 6 December 2003: opening of Winter Wonderland.
- 25 May 2005: Anschutz Entertainment Group sells the naming rights to the former Millennium Dome to O2 plc, a British mobile phone company.
- 24 June 2007: The O2 opens, with a concert by Bon Jovi.

== In popular culture ==
- Within the foundations of the Dome in 1998, a time capsule was buried by Katy Hill and Richard Bacon, two of the then-current presenters of the long running BBC children's programme Blue Peter. The capsule was due to be opened in 2050, but was accidentally unearthed and damaged in 2017 during building work. It was originally intended to be reburied once it had been repaired, but was instead opened and its contents taken on a tour of the UK. It was subsequently stored in the National Archives until 2050 alongside a new Diamond Time Capsule celebrating the show's 60th anniversary.
- The song "Silvertown Blues" from Mark Knopfler's 2000 album Sailing to Philadelphia deals with the construction of The Dome.
- Two books about the attempted robbery of the De Beers diamonds from the Dome were published in 2004: Diamond Geezers – The Inside Story of the Crime of the Millennium (ISBN 1843171228) written by Kris Hollington, published by Michael O'Mara Books Ltd, and Dome Raiders – How Scotland Yard Foiled the Greatest Robbery of All Time (ISBN 1852271949) written by Jon Shatford and William Doyle, published by Virgin Books.
- In 2005, the Dome was featured in a task on The Amazing Race 7, in which contestants had to drive an AEC Routemaster double-decker bus through the structure's car park.
- Gideon's Daughter is a 2006 BBC television drama written and directed by Stephen Poliakoff, stars Bill Nighy as a publicist working to promote the Dome in the run-up to its grand opening. Emily Blunt plays the titular daughter who is disdainful of the project, while Miranda Richardson plays Gideon's love interest whose simple observations about his life – and the Dome – reshape Gideon's life. Both Nighy and Blunt received Golden Globe Awards for their performances. The show won a Peabody Award in April 2007.
- The Millennium Dome was prominently featured in the pre-title sequence of the 1999 James Bond film The World Is Not Enough. Bond falls down the outside of the Dome when pursuing a target, injuring his shoulder in the process.

== See also ==
- Millennium Bridge, London
- A Slice of Reality
- Tensile architecture
- Crossings of the River Thames
- Tunnels underneath the River Thames

Preceded by Olympia Hall (United Kingdom) London	Miss World Venue; 2000	Succeeded by Sun City Exhibition Center (South Africa) Sun City
