= Millennium Dome raid =

Attempted robbery of diamond exhibition

Millennium Dome Raid
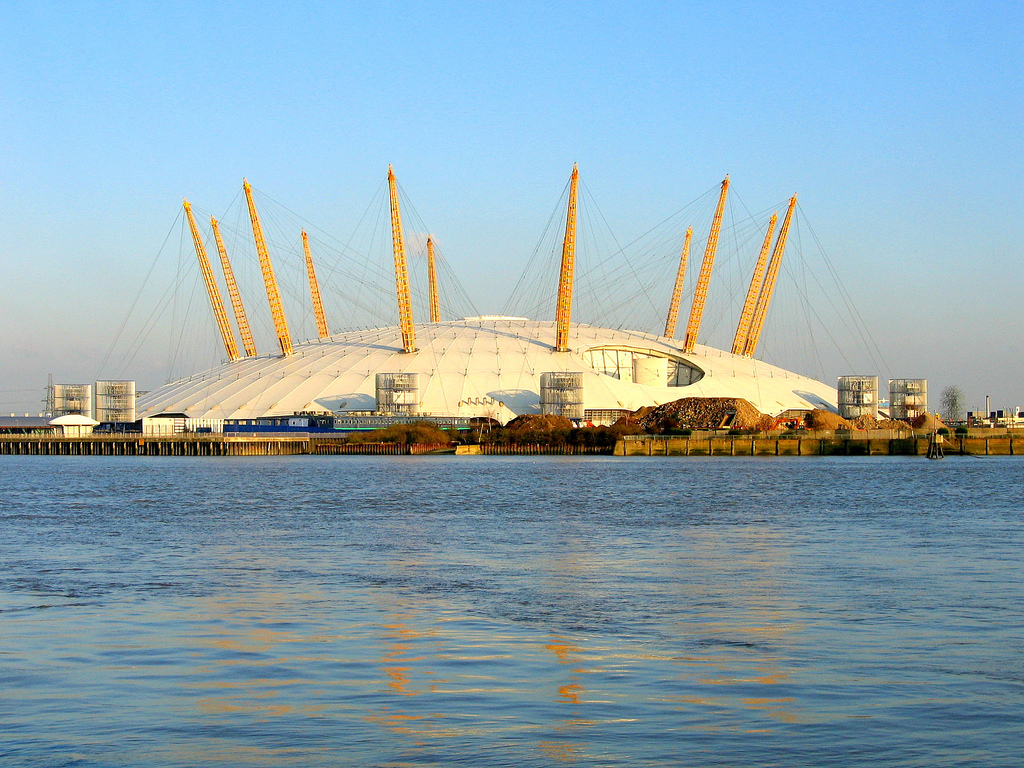
- Location: The Millennium Dome, Greenwich Peninsula, London, England
- Date: 7 November 2000
- Target: De Beers Diamond Exhibition
- Perpetrators: Lee Wenham; Raymond Betson; William Cockram; Terry Millman; Aldo Ciarrocchi; Robert Adams; Kevin Meredith; James Hurley

The Millennium Dome raid was an attempted burglary of the Millennium Dome's diamond exhibition in Greenwich, South East London occurring on 7 November 2000. A local gang planned to ram-raid the De Beers diamond exhibition, which was held in the riverside Dome. The gang had then planned to escape via the Thames in a speedboat.

The De Beers diamond exhibition had many jewels on display, including the Millennium Star, a flawless 203.04-carat (40.608 g) gem with an estimated worth of £200 million (equivalent to £380 million in 2025) and considered one of the most perfect gems in the world. Also on display were priceless blue diamonds.

The attempted robbery was foiled by the Flying Squad (led by Jon Shatford) of the Metropolitan Police Service as a result of information from Kent Police Serious Crime who already had the gang members under surveillance for their suspected roles in several unsuccessful armoured vehicle robberies. The operation to foil the robbery was the biggest in the Flying Squad's history. At trial, the judge commended the way it was carried out.

If the heist had succeeded, then with a haul of £350 million worth of diamonds (equivalent to £665 million in 2025), it would have become one of the biggest burglaries in history.

== Operation Magician ==
In the summer of 2000, the Flying Squad became aware of a significant armed robbery plot after receiving a tip-off. The location of this robbery was unclear, but the identities of some of the robbers were known to the police. The police spent several months developing intelligence on the plot and set up an operation they codenamed Operation Magician. During the intelligence gathering, the location of the robbery was found to be the Millennium Dome in Greenwich.

In February 2000, armed men tried to pull off a £10 million raid on a security van in Nine Elms, South London. The gunmen had stopped the security van by blocking both ends of Nine Elms Lane. They had planned to use their lorry carrying Christmas trees as a battering ram. This lorry had a huge metal spike welded into the chassis and covered by the foliage. The gang planned to split the security van's rear doors with the ram. The gang's plan failed when a motorist who was late for work removed the keys from the ignition of the unattended Christmas tree lorry. The robbers, left with no choice, escaped in an inflatable speedboat towards Chelsea.

It was attempted again on 7 July in Aylesford, Kent. This time, the gang got closer to the cash, with the metal spike rammed into the van. They were seconds from taking the money when an unexpected police car appeared; the gang shot at the approaching vehicle and again made their escape in an inflatable speedboat.

Detective Superintendent Jon Shatford stated that this attempted robbery brought to his attention a gang capable of carrying out a robbery with this level of planning. This unsuccessful attack provided the police with important clues and led them to track some of the vehicles used in the raid to two isolated farms in rural Kent, which were then put under 24-hour surveillance.

After this unsuccessful robbery, the police received a tip-off about the Dome raid from an informer. At a meeting between detectives to discuss the Nine Elms Lane attempted robbery and the information the informer provided about the Dome raid, one detective who had recently visited the Dome quipped, "Maybe they are after the Millennium jewels?" This comment led to the beginning of an investigation into the raid.

== Surveillance ==
On 1 September 2000, the team identified three suspected robbers—Lee Wenham, Raymond Betson, and William Cockram—making repeated visits to the Dome. It was noticed that the River Thames—a tidal river—was at high tide every time they visited. They were observed visiting the exhibition and recording video footage, leading the police to suspect the exhibition could be a target. The surveillance on the men was significantly increased, and the Dome was placed under close watch.

The precautions taken by the Flying Squad included replacing the priceless gems with replicas of the same size (one of which is now in the Crime Museum), allowing the originals to be stored elsewhere, and installing a false wall, behind which 20 police in full tactical gear could wait, inside the exhibit room.

Due to an increase in surveillance, the police discovered other members of the gang. These included Terry Millman, tasked with obtaining the getaway speedboat for the escape. Cockram and Betson were also observed filming the surrounding river and jetty. The surveillance of the gang continued, and their visits to the Dome became more frequent. In late September, a few members of the gang were spotted testing a speedboat in a harbour in Kent.

== Aborted robbery attempts ==
Some gang members were spotted towing a speedboat to Greenwich and placing the boat in the river opposite the Dome. This suggested to the Squad that the robbery was close, but it was not. Police analysed the times and days of the aborted attempts and found that they had something in common: the tide was at its highest on the day of each aborted attempt. The police could then predict the possible times that the raid was to take place; one of the predicted days was the date the raid was made.

The Metropolitan Police told De Beers and the Dome's management of the possible days the raid could occur. There were aborted attempts on two of the days that the police had identified. The first was in early October, and was called off due to the malfunctioning of the getaway speedboat. On several days in October, the gang under surveillance looked as if they were about to commence the raid. The second actual attempt was cancelled upon the gang discovering the tide was too low to ensure a safe getaway.

After the second aborted attempt, the police suspected the raid was imminent and were convinced the raid would take place the following day. The police then replaced all Dome staff with armed undercover officers.

== Day of raid ==
On 7 November at 9:30 am, Operation Magician was underway, commanded by Detective Superintendent Jon Shatford of the Metropolitan Police. A total of two hundred officers were involved in the operation, of which forty were from the Specialist Firearms Command (SCO19). A further sixty armed Flying Squad officers were stationed around the Thames and twenty on the river to prevent escape attempts. Surveillance officers were disguised as Dome employees. The police used the Millennium Dome's CCTV room as a control room.

All the officers were briefed at 3 am, the day of the raid, on the contingency plans in place. Before the raid, some officers were positioned behind a dummy wall, and others were dressed as cleaners and Dome employees, with their firearms concealed. Before the raid, four members of the gang had been identified in a JCB earth digger, and all were wearing body armour and gas masks. The men were armed with smoke bombs, sledgehammers, and nail guns to be used to penetrate the security glass that was protecting the exhibit. The digger was used by the gang to break through the perimeter fence and to crash through the side wall of the Dome to reach the Money Zone, where the De Beers diamonds were kept. The digger entered the Dome and parked outside the Money Zone.

Once inside, Ciarrocchi started throwing smoke bombs, and Cockram attacked the glass where the diamonds were stored. The police pounced on four members of the gang as they attempted to smash their way into the display case. As the four men were arrested, other officers stationed around the Dome arrested another man in a high-powered boat on the Thames. The police also arrested a man they suspected of monitoring police radio frequencies, on the north shore of the Thames, opposite the Dome. All the suspects were apprehended; Millman was apprehended in a van. Once all the suspects had been detained, they were taken to police stations in South London. By noon, some areas of the Dome had reopened, but other areas, including the Money Zone, were cordoned off.

Shatford defended the decision to wait until the gang had reached the replica diamonds before arresting them. He said, "Our chief concern throughout was public safety. We decided it was better to let the robbers get to the vault where they were effectively imprisoned".

The serious crime unit of the Kent Police worked in conjunction with the Metropolitan Police Service. It arrested six more people in connection with the raid on Tuesday morning in the villages of Collier Street and Horsmonden. Police said the ages of the men ranged between 38 and 62.

== Trial ==
The case came to trial a year later, on 8 November 2001. It was heard at the Old Bailey, and only six members of the gang were present, as Terry Millman had died of cancer. The court heard that Betson, Cockram, Ciarrocchi, and Adams were caught by undercover officers in the Dome when they burst inside by using a JCB digger.

On the first day of the defence case, Cockram discussed the lack of security inside the Dome: "I couldn't believe how simple it was. ... I was thinking, this cannot be true, it was a gift. At first, I had thought it was pie in the sky, but after going down there, I couldn't believe security was so bad. ... There was nobody in the vault, no security workers walking around". He stated that had the plan succeeded, "It would have taken a very short time from hitting the main gate to getting back across the Thames – five minutes maximum". He also added, "No one was going to get hurt – there was no one to hurt. ... The Dome was always empty".

Cockram explained that the nail gun bought by the gang was to be used to break the glass in the vault, not as a weapon. The ammonia was to be used to contaminate any traces of blood left by him, he said. He explained that the body armour was to be used after the raid for protection when he was scheduled to meet with associates to discuss the sale of the gems.

Betson told the jury that his brother-in-law, Michael Waring, working at the Dome as part of the perimeter security, had told him about a school friend, Tony, who was also working there. Betson claimed that Waring had told him about Tony's plan: "Tony had got this plan together. He had a backer – someone to buy the jewellery. He said the security was crap."

Betson said, "I had every confidence in him – there was no way I thought he would betray me – not for two seconds. ... If this had come to me from someone else – in a pub – I would not have gone along with it, but it was the background to where it had come from. It was solid." Betson explained how he developed a trusting relationship with Waring: "I did not think he would try and do me any harm. I trusted him." Cockram also said that Betson had told him that Waring was in on the plan. Called as a prosecution witness, Waring "totally denied" that he was part of the plan or had offered to act criminally by providing information on security.

The gang had invested tens of thousands of pounds planning the raid, and stored the equipment needed at a disused commercial yard in Plumstead, southeast London, and at two remote Kent farms near Maidstone. Terry Millman, who had died of cancer before the trial, used the name T. Diamond when he paid £3,700 in cash to purchase a getaway speedboat at a yard in the seaside town of Whitstable, Kent.

At the trial, Crown Prosecutor Martin Heslop, QC, said that "the raid was planned professionally, carefully and down to the last detail. ... So well organised was it that it would probably have succeeded had it not been for an equally professional, careful, and detailed police operation." Heslop stated that to minimize the risk to the public, "Arrangements were made to keep children away from the danger area, but for obvious reasons, it was not practicable to alert all staff to the possibility of an attack."

After three months of the trial, the jury of seven women and five men reached a 10–2 majority verdict against the defendants after they had deliberated for nearly seven court days. After a week of deliberations the judge Michael Coombe accepted the majority verdict and so the men were found guilty. The judge told the defendants, "You played for very high stakes, and you must have known perfectly well what the penalty would be if your enterprise did not succeed." The judge added, "This was a wicked, professional plan, and one which was carried out with the minutest attention to detail. Mercifully, the police were on to it."

Betson and Cockram, considered the two leaders of the gang, were both given 18-year sentences. Aldo Ciarrocchi and Robert Adams were sentenced to 15 years. Kevin Meredith was cleared of conspiracy to rob but found guilty of conspiring to steal and was sentenced to five years.

== Members of the gang ==
| Name | Sentences |
|---|---|
| Lee Wenham | Sentenced to four years in jail after pleading guilty to conspiracy to steal. At the same time, he was sentenced to nine years after pleading guilty to the Aylesford attempted robbery, in July 2000. Considered to have masterminded the raid. Ultimately served only four and a half years. |
| Raymond Betson | Sentenced 18 years for conspiring to rob. Sentence later reduced to 15 years. Convicted again in 2014, following a botched raid on a cash depot in 2012, and sentenced to 13 years. |
| William Cockram | Sentenced 18 years for conspiring to rob. The sentence was later reduced to 15 years on appeal. |
| Terry Millman | Died of cancer before trial date of 8 November 2001. |
| Aldo Ciarrocchi | Received 15 years (reduced to 12 years in 2004). |
| Robert Adams | Received 15 years. |
| Kevin Meredith | Was cleared of conspiracy to rob but found guilty of conspiring to steal. He was sentenced to five years. |

== Aftermath ==
Cockram, sentenced to 18 years for his part in the raid, alleged that a police officer assaulted him at about 9:39 a.m. on the day of the raid, as he was lying handcuffed on the floor. He was awarded legal aid to sue the Metropolitan Police Service in March 2003, a decision that was condemned by Shadow Home Secretary David Davis.

One of the diamonds that had been on display was a rare pear-shaped blue diamond with an estimated worth of £3 to £3.8 million, which was sold for £4.2 million in April 2010 in Sotheby's Hong Kong.

The Flying Squad arrested a man believed to be the mastermind behind the plot, who had not taken part in the actual raid. The man, James Hurley, from Bermondsey, south London, was arrested following an undercover operation which tracked Hurley to Puerto Banus on the Costa del Sol, Spain. The officer in charge of Operation Magician, Detective Chief Superintendent Jon Shatford, arrived in Spain with a team of three others and an emergency warrant for Hurley's arrest.

Hurley had been under surveillance by the police when he was spotted refining and testing the robbery plan for weeks in advance. He was dubbed the "boatman" by the police as he was seen taking photographs of the Dome from vessels on the Thames and was organising the speedboat to be used for the getaway. Hurley disappeared at the last minute before the raid took place. Following his disappearance, the National Criminal Intelligence Service and the Spanish police were initially unable to locate him.

Hurley was living in a luxury villa in a private enclave close to Puerto Banus. Once his identity had been confirmed, a High Court judge in London issued a red extradition warrant for his arrest. He was arrested by Spanish police following a chase in Puerto Banus on the Costa del Sol. However, on 26 February 2002 the extradition warrant was withdrawn by the Crown Prosecution Service, who decided there was not a realistic prospect of securing a conviction against Hurley.

The JCB digger used, displaying damage from the raid, was sold at JCB's biannual auction of surplus parts and machines.

== In popular culture ==
- Dome Raiders: How Scotland Yard Foiled the Greatest Robbery of All Time, a book by Detective Superintendent Jon Shatford and William Doyle, details the raid.
- The Crime & Investigation Network, as part of their series on Britain's Biggest Heists, ran an episode that featured the Millennium Dome raid. This episode includes CCTV footage of the raid and footage recorded by undercover police at the time.
- Kris Hollington, a Sunday Times bestselling author and freelance journalist, wrote a book entitled Diamond Geezers: The Inside Story of the Crime of the Millennium. The book tells the story of the raid and contains interviews with the police and De Beers.
- The Millennium Dome Heist with Ross Kemp (also distributed internationally as The Great Diamond Heist) is a 2020 British documentary about the raid hosted by Ross Kemp.
- The Discovery+ series Inside The Heist focused on the raid as part of the first episode.
- The Diamond Heist, a three-part Netflix documentary film executive-produced by Guy Ritchie, 2025.
- Season 62, named "The Millennium Dome Heist" of the Wondery Podcast series, British Scandal, covered this story over 4 episodes in 2025, their final containing an interview with Lee Wenham.

== See also ==
- Chandler's Ford shooting, another attempted robbery foiled by the Flying Squad in 2007.
