= Moussaieff Red Diamond =

Largest known red diamond

Moussaieff Red
- Weight: 5.11 carats (1.022 g)
- Color: Fancy Red
- Cut: Triangular Brilliant
- Country of origin: Brazil
- Mine of origin: Unknown
- Discovered: 1989
- Cut by: William Goldberg Diamond Corp.
- Original owner: Ricardo E. P. Filho
- Owner: Moussaieff Jewellers Ltd.
- Estimated value: $20 million

The Moussaieff Red Diamond (formerly known as the Red Shield Diamond) is a diamond measuring 5.11 carats (1.022g) with a triangular brilliant cut (sometimes called a trillion or a trilliant cut), rated in color as Fancy Red by the Gemological Institute of America. It is the world's largest known red diamond, the rarest of all diamond colors.

The Moussaieff Red was discovered by a Brazilian garimpeiro named Ze Tatu in a manual digging in the district of Major Porto in 1989, in a region known as Noroeste de Minas in the state of Minas Gerais. The rough stone weighed 13.9 carats (2.78 g). The diamond was purchased and cut by the William Goldberg Diamond Corp., where it went by its original name, the Red Shield. It was purchased in 2001 or 2002 by Shlomo Moussaieff, an Israeli-born jewelry dealer in London. It is currently owned by Moussaieff Jewellers Ltd.

The Moussaieff Red was displayed in 2003 as part of the Smithsonian Institution's "The Splendor of Diamonds" exhibit, alongside The De Beers Millennium Star and The Heart of Eternity.

== See also ==
- List of diamonds
