= Heart of Eternity =

- Weight: 27.64 carats (5.528 g)
- Color: Fancy Vivid Blue
- Cut: Heart
- Country of origin: South Africa
- Mine of origin: Premier Diamond Mine
- Discovered: (unveiled January 2000)
- Cut by: Steinmetz Group
- Original owner: De Beers
- Estimated value: at least USD 17 million

The Heart of Eternity is a diamond measuring 27.64 carats (5.528 g), rated in color as "Fancy Vivid Blue" by the Gemological Institute of America. The Heart of Eternity was cut by the Steinmetz Group, who owned the diamond before selling it to the De Beers Group.

The Heart of Eternity is a rare colored diamond discovered in the Premier Diamond Mine of South Africa. The Premier mine is notable for being the only mine known to produce a significant quantity of blue diamonds.

The Heart of Eternity was unveiled in January 2000 as part of the De Beers Millennium Jewels collection, which included the Millennium Star. The Heart of Eternity was featured with ten other blue diamonds; the collection of blue diamonds totalled 118 carats (23.6 g). The De Beers Millennium Jewels were displayed at London's Millennium Dome throughout 2000. An attempt on 7 November 2000 to steal the collection was foiled.

In 2012, there have been rumors that the boxer Floyd Mayweather Jr. bought the Heart of Eternity necklace for his fiancée, Shantel Jackson. De Beers did not say whom they sold the Heart of Eternity Diamond to, and so its current owner was left unknown.

== See also ==
- List of diamonds
