= Noroeste de Minas (mesoregion) =

- Mesoregion
- Location of Noroeste de Minas
- Coordinates: 17°13′19″S 46°52′30″W
- Country: Brazil
- Region: Southeast
- State: Minas Gerais

Area
  - Total: 62,381.061 km^{2} (24,085.462 sq mi)

Population (2006/IBGE)
  - Total: 392,607
  - Density: 5.7/km^{2} (15/sq mi)
- Time zone: UTC-3 (BRT)
  - Summer (DST): UTC-2 (BRST)

Noroeste de Minas (transl. Northwestern Minas) is one of the twelve mesoregions of the Brazilian state of Minas Gerais. It is composed of 19 municipalities distributed across 2 microregions.
