= Jean Kazandjian =

French artist (born 1938)

Jean Kazandjian (born February 10, 1938) is a French artist of Armenian descent working in Paris and Los Angeles.

== Biography ==
Through the 1970s, Kazandjian was active in the Parisian art circles where he met with painters Francis Bacon, Alexander Calder and Giorgio de Chirico.

After settling in Southern California, Kazandjian became influenced by surrealism and pop-culture.

== Solo exhibitions ==
- 2014 National Gallery of Armenia, Yerevan.
