= Kazanjian Red Diamond =

5.05 carat red diamond

- Weight: 5.05 carats (1.010 g)
- Color: Red
- Cut: Emerald
- Country of origin: South Africa
- Discovered: mid-1920s
- Cut by: Goudvis Brothers
- Owner: Kazanjian Brothers, Inc.

The Kazanjian Red Diamond, previously known as the Red Diamond, is a 5.05-carat red diamond. It was found in South Africa in the 1920s, and was cut in Amsterdam. The Nazis seized the diamond during World War II. It was rediscovered after the war, and changed owners multiple times before it was bought in 2007 by the Kazanjian Brothers.

== Description ==
The Kazanjian Red Diamond is a 5.05-carat emerald-cut red diamond. Red diamonds are the rarest type of colored diamond. The diamond measures 0.39 inches (9.9 mm) on the sides, and 0.23 inches (5.8 mm) in depth. It is the second-largest red diamond ever found, behind only the 5.11-carat Moussaieff Red Diamond.

== History ==
In the mid-1920s (possibly 1927), during a diamond rush in South Africa, a 35-carat piece of boart was found in Lichtenberg. The boart was sent to Goudvis Brothers, a firm in Amsterdam. There was initial disagreement over whether the boart was of any worth. Seven months were spent polishing and examining the stone, and the final 5.05-carat emerald-cut diamond was completed.

It was said that the diamond had the appearance of "a drop of blood" when held near a candle. Tiffany & Co. offered $100,000 for the diamond, but the Goudvis Brothers declined the offer, because they wanted $150,000. When World War II began, it was locked in a safe in Arnhem. In 1944, however, the Nazis, who occupied the Netherlands, confiscated the diamond. It was then taken to Germany and placed in a salt mine in Berchtesgaden, near a retreat belonging to Adolf Hitler. The Nazis had also hidden some other stolen items in the mine.

After the war ended, Joseph McNarney, an American general, found the diamond and thought it was a ruby. After it was discovered that the stone was not a ruby, it was returned to the Goudvis Brothers' estate, which was in debt as a result of the war. The diamond was sold for 57,000 guilders to George Prins, a broker. Sir Ernest Oppenheimer bought the diamond, and later sold it to the Royal Asscher Diamond Company. It was then purchased by a private collector. In February 2007, upon identifying the diamond, the Kazanjian Brothers, a jewelry company in Beverly Hills, purchased the diamond from a woman in East Asia. The diamond, which was previously known as the "Red Diamond", was then named the "Kazanjian Red Diamond". The diamond is now displayed around the world to raise funds for charity efforts.

== See also ==
- List of diamonds
