= Millennium Star =

203.04-carat colourless diamond from Zaire

- Weight: 203.04 carats (40.608 g)
- Color: Grade D Colorless
- Cut: Pear Brilliant
- Country of origin: Zaire
- Mine of origin: Mbuji-Mayi
- Discovered: 1990
- Cut by: Steinmetz Group
- Owner: De Beers
- Estimated value: Insured for £100,000,000

The Millennium Star is a diamond that was sold to an anonymous buyer in 2006, thought to be in Asia, by De Beers. At 203.04 carats (40.608 g), it is the world's second-largest known top-color (grade D, i.e., colorless), internally and externally flawless, pear-shaped diamond.

The diamond was discovered in the Mbuji-Mayi district of Zaire in 1990 in alluvial deposits; uncut, it was 777 carats (155.4 g). De Beers purchased it during the height of the country's Civil War in the early to mid-nineties. Workers of the Steinmetz Diamond Group took over three years to produce the classic pear form. The cutting was done using lasers.

It was first displayed in October 1999 as the centerpiece of the De Beers Millennium diamond collection. The collection also includes eleven blue diamonds totaling 118 carats (23.6 g) and The Heart of Eternity. They were displayed at London's Millennium Dome over 2000.

There was an attempt on 7 November 2000 to steal the collection from the Millennium Dome, but the Metropolitan Police discovered the plot and arrested the robbers before their escape. Crime journalist Kris Hollington wrote a book called Diamond Geezers (ISBN 1843171228) about the attempted theft. The book also features a detailed history of the Millennium Star. The attempted robbery was featured in the 2025 Netflix documentary The Diamond Heist.

The largest cut white (D) diamond by weight is the 1991 modified heart-shaped 273.85 carats (54.770 g) Centenary Diamond.

== See also ==
- List of diamonds
