= List of Coronation Street characters introduced in 1990 =

The following is a list of characters that first appeared in the ITV soap opera Coronation Street in 1990, by order of first appearance.

== Vicky Arden ==
Vicky McDonald
- Coronation Street character
- Portrayed by: Helen Warburton (1990); Chloe Newsome (1991–1998)
- Duration: 1990–1996, 1998
- First appearance: 5 January 1990
- Last appearance: 30 December 1998
- Introduced by: Mervyn Watson (1990, 1991); David Hanson (1998)
- Spin-off appearances: Coronation Street: After Hours (1999)
In-universe information
- Occupation: Wine bar owner
- Father: Tim Arden
- Mother: Sandra Arden
- Husband: Steve McDonald (1995–1996); Robert Arden (1999–)
- Grandfathers: Alec Gilroy
- Grandmothers: Joyce Shaw

Vicky Arden (formerly McDonald) was played by Helen Warburton in 1990 and Chloe Newsome from 1991 to 1998. She is Alec Gilroy's (Roy Barraclough) granddaughter and the ex-wife of Steve McDonald (Simon Gregson). After first appearing in January 1990, Vicky visits Coronation Street when her parents, Tim and Sandra Arden, arrange for Alec and Bet to collect her from the train station when she arrives from boarding school. This was so that they could attend the funeral of Sandra's mother, Joyce; Sandra did not want Vicky to attend, as it would be too upsetting for her. However, on the day of Vicky's arrival, the police arrive at the Rovers Return Inn to tell Alec that Tim and Sandra have died in a car crash. Her grandfather Alec and his wife Bet (Julie Goodyear) therefore become her legal guardians as Vicky is still only 14 years old.

Vicky goes to a private boarding school and owns a horse called Saracen, so holidays in a back street pub are not an attractive option. However, when she meets Steve McDonald, it is some compensation. Alec desperately tries to separate the couple but fails. She resists his sexual advances for a short time, until finally she loses her virginity to him. This is not important to Steve, and he also dates nurse Alison Rathbone. They then both dump him. After Alec leaves to go and work in Southampton, Vicky continues to return to the Rovers and treats Bet as her grandmother. On reaching her 18th birthday, Vicky inherits £240,000 from her parents. To Bet's distress, Vicky immediately abandons her studies and decides the money would be better than her schooling. She visits Alec for a while to explain her decision to him. When she returns, she is keen to confide in old flame Steve, but he is seeing hairdresser Fiona Middleton (Angela Griffin). However, Vicky gets his attention when she invests £1,500 in his T-shirt company. Despite this, she loses her money when an order for Costello's nightclub falls through owing to the venue going bust.

Rather than put her off, this inspires Vicky to enrol on a Business Studies course at the local Technical College, and she becomes Steve's business partner, insisting that she has control of the finances, annoying Fiona. This gets worse when Vicky and Steve go to Dublin for a 'business' weekend. Fiona dumps him, leaving the way clear for Vicky. She seduces him easily and they announce their engagement at Steve's 21st birthday party in 1995, shocking everybody and incensing Bet. Alec returns for a brief period, to convince Vicky to end the relationship, to no avail; he even offers Steve £5,000 not to marry Vicky. Eventually, the pair marry in St. Lucia, and Bet gives her blessing, as she knows that Vicky is happy. Vicky's relationship with Bet sours in October 1995 when she refuses to provide her with the funds to buy The Rovers Return when it is put up for sale. Bet kicks Vicky out of the pub and doesn't tell her about her plans to depart which happen later the same day.

After their marriage, Vicky and Steve have a long honeymoon in the Caribbean and America. When they return, they turn their attention to the business, which needs another injection of capital, again provided by Vicky. Their relationship struggles, thanks to Steve spending Vicky's money, and the final straw comes when he is arrested on Christmas Day 1995 for buying stolen whisky. Steve is guilty, but persuades Vicky to bribe Malcolm Fox to say that he did not know that the whisky was stolen. Steve is freed, and they assume that they are safe. However, in early 1996, the police discover the bribery when Malcolm's wife confesses in spite after she discovers he has been having an affair. Alec returns to the streets again to support his granddaughter and makes it clear that he holds Steve completely responsible for the situation. Vicky and Steve are arrested and they stand trial, blaming each other, and both are found guilty. Steve is sentenced to two years in prison, and Vicky is given a one-year suspended sentence. She decides to get on with her life without Steve, and enrols in a hotel management course at an exclusive college in Switzerland thanks to Alec's contacts. She leaves in June 1996, and divorces Steve while he is in prison. Before she leaves, Vicky makes final amends with Fiona and with Steve's parents Jim and Liz.

Vicky returns to the Street with a bang at Christmas 1998. She accidentally hits Steve's car as she parks her car outside the Rovers while visiting Alec. Vicky has blossomed into a mature young woman, a far cry from the spoilt, impressionable teen that came to the Rovers many years before. She has just bought a wine bar in Brighton, and wants advice from her grandfather. Alec is having problems with the Duckworths, who are now licensees at the pub, and is getting very despondent, so Vicky persuades him to go into partnership with her, and Alec sells the Rovers to the recently widowed Natalie Barnes (Denise Welch). They leave Coronation Street together with hopes of a great future.

In November 1999, Steve and his friend, Vikram Desai (Chris Bisson), are heading to Calais to buy cigarettes and alcohol. Vikram discovers they are going via Brighton to see Vicky. On arrival at "Vicky's" – the wine bar she owns – Steve discovers that she is about to remarry. He plans to rekindle his relationship with her so that he can get his hands on her money and business, betting Vikram £100 that he can stop the wedding. It transpires that Vicky's bar is actually in trouble, as she asks Bet for a loan, but she refuses. Steve successfully seduces Vicky, and she admits that she cannot marry her fiancé, Robert. She also tells him she is broke, and the wine bar is losing money. He promises to pick her up later and return to Weatherfield, but Steve and Vikram leave without her. Vicky realises that she has been stood up, so Bet takes her back to the bar, and Vicky realises she does want to marry Robert after all. In 2002, Bet stated that Vicky was happily married.

== Tim Arden ==
Tim Arden
- Coronation Street character
- Portrayed by: John Flanagan
- First appearance: 5 January 1990
- Last appearance: 13 June 1990
In-universe information
- Wife: Sandra Gilroy (1976–1991)
- Daughters: Vicky McDonald

Tim Arden is husband of Sandra Arden and father of Vicky McDonald. Tim makes sparing appearances when his father-in-law Alec Gilroy visits the family. Tim makes his final appearance on 13 June 1990. 13 months later, shortly after Sandra was seen again on screen without Tim, a police sergeant arrives at the Rovers Return Inn to tell Alec that both Tim and Sandra have died in a car crash en route to Sandra's mother, Joyce's funeral.

== Sandra Arden ==
Sandra Arden
- Coronation Street character
- Portrayed by: Kathy Jamieson
- Duration: 1990–1991
- First appearance: 5 January 1990
- Last appearance: 17 July 1991
- Introduced by: Mervyn Watson
In-universe information
- Father: Alec Gilroy
- Mother: Joyce Shaw
- Stepfather: Stan Shaw
- Stepmother: Bet Gilroy
- Husband: Tim Arden (1976–1991)
- Daughters: Vicky McDonald
- Grandfathers: Reg Gilroy; Harry Crosby
- Grandmothers: Mabel Gilroy
- Aunts: Edna Gilroy; Brenda Gilroy

Sandra Arden (also Gilroy) is the daughter of Alec and Joyce Gilroy.

Alec decides to contact his daughter to make up for the last twenty years and gets Sandra's address from his ex-wife Joyce. After discovering that Sandra lives in a big house in Cheshire with her husband Tim and their daughter, Vicky.

After initial misunderstandings between the Ardens and the Gilroys, Sandra tells Alec that he could keep in touch with them. In July 1991, Joyce dies and Sandra asks Alec to meet Vicky at boarding school and to let her stay at the Rovers Return so that she and Tim can attend Joyce's funeral in Whitby.

Before the Gilroys set off for the train station, a Police Sergeant arrives to tell Alec that Sandra and Tim have both died in a car crash.

== Peter Ingram ==
Peter Ingram
- Coronation Street character
- Portrayed by: Tony Osoba
- First appearance: 22 January 1990
- Last appearance: 15 August 1990
- Introduced by: Mervyn Watson
In-universe information
- Occupation: Businessman
- Wife: Jackie Ingram (until 1990)

Peter Ingram was the boss of Ingram Textiles, where Mike Baldwin (Johnny Briggs) worked after he sold Baldwin's Casuals. Ingram was the only person that Mike had ever worked for aside from his father. By August, Mike ended up setting up his own business Phoenix Casuals. Ingram died on 17 August 1990 and his widow, Jackie (Shirin Taylor) subsequently married Mike the following year.

== Johnny Johnson ==
Johnny Johnson
- Coronation Street character
- Portrayed by: Vincenzo Ricotta (1990); Robert Gwilym (1996)
- Duration: 1990, 1996
- First appearance: 5 February 1990
- Last appearance: 28 February 1996
- Introduced by: Mervyn Watson (1990); Sue Pritchard (1996)
In-universe information
- Wife: Lucy Johnson

Johnny "JJ" Johnson was one of Jim McDonald (Charles Lawson)'s army friends from when they were in the Royal Engineers together. He first visited the McDonald's at 11 Coronation Street, their first home on civvy street as he was going for a job interview in Manchester, the same job that Jim was going for. However, out of respect for his friend, Jim didn't tell him he wanted the job and allowed him to stay at No. 11.

Johnny was next seen in 1996 when Jim attended a reunion in Macclesfield with his wife Liz McDonald (Beverly Callard). Since his last appearance, he had spent a few years in Australia and married a lady called Lucy. It was also revealed that he and Liz had a fling back in 1974, just after the twins Andy McDonald (Nicholas Cochrane) and Steve McDonald (Simon Gregson) were born. This caused Jim to turn violent and the couple to divorce in 1997.

== Steph Barnes ==
Steph Barnes
- Coronation Street character
- Portrayed by: Amelia Bullmore
- Duration: 1990–1992, 1995
- First appearance: Episode 3030; 12 February 1990
- Last appearance: Episode 3917; 4 October 1995
- Introduced by: Mervyn Watson (1990); Carolyn Reynolds (1992); Sue Pritchard (1995)
In-universe information
- Occupation: Saleswoman; Fast food worker
- Father: Maurice Jones
- Mother: Carol Jones
- Husband: Des Barnes (1990–1993)

Stephanie "Steph" Barnes (née Jones), played by Amelia Bullmore, made her first screen appearance on 12 February 1990 and departed on 2 September 1991, she later returned for two separate stints in April 1992 and September 1995, making her final appearance on 4 October 1995. Steph and her husband Des Barnes (Philip Middlemiss) arrived in Coronation Street shortly after getting married, they moved into one of the newly built houses. As a wedding present, Steph's father and builder of the houses Maurice Jones (Alan Moore) sold the newly built 6 Coronation Street to the couple at cost price. The Barnes spent their honeymoon in Mallorca after which they began settling into the Street. Steph worked at the perfume counter, and Des as a bookie's clerk. Steph and Des shared a devilish sense of humour; when Steph flirted with Kevin Webster (Michael Le Vell) for a laugh, making him scared of her, Des bet her that she couldn't shave off his moustache. Steph won the bet by throwing a housewarming party and luring Kevin upstairs and going at him with scissors.

Architect Simon Beatty (Peter Gowen) commenced work on a warehouse next door to Steph's work. He would often come into the store to flirt with Steph, which she enjoyed. An affair began and Steph drifted away from Des. While on a date, Steph and Simon were seen kissing by her next-door neighbour Derek Wilton (Peter Baldwin). Steph wasn't ready for Des to know the truth and asked Derek to keep what he'd seen to himself. Although he and his wife Mavis (Thelma Barlow) didn't tell Des, they made such nuisances of themselves lecturing Steph on her infidelity that Des warned Derek to stop pestering his wife, leading Mavis to blow Steph's secret in Derek's defence. Steph made the decision to leave Des for Simon. Des made one last attempt to stop Steph from leaving him by slashing her suitcases, but Steph moved out regardless.

Over time, Simon grew jealous and possessive and Steph left him for another man. To avoid a messy break-up, she told Simon that there was nobody else and the relationship had just run its course. To throw Simon off the scent, Steph turned up at Des's door, asking if she could stay in the spare room for a few nights. Staying with Des made sense, as Simon knew that Steph would never reconcile with him so she could use it as a refuge until the dust settled. However, her arrival sent out the wrong message to Des, who was eager for a reconciliation and let his current girlfriend Raquel Wolstenhulme (Sarah Lancashire) walk out on him after he sided with Steph against her in an argument. When Steph saw that Des was getting his hopes up, she confessed that she had a new boyfriend, breaking his heart again. A year later, Des and Steph began divorce proceedings.

Nearly two years after this, Des bumped into Steph who was working at a fast food outlet. Steph was heavily pregnant but she and the father were no longer in a relationship and she was living in a grotty bedsit. Des helped Steph find a flat and paid £500 as a deposit for her. Steph asked Des if he wanted to start again but Des didn't love her anymore and wanted to leave her in the past.

== Felicity Khan ==
Felicity Khan
- Coronation Street character
- Portrayed by: Rita Wolf
- First appearance: 14 February 1990
- Last appearance: 1 August 1990
- Introduced by: Mervyn Watson
In-universe information
- Occupation: Student
- Mother: Mrs Khan
- Sisters: Joanne Khan

Felicity "Flick" Khan, was a student at Manchester Polytechnic who lodged at No. 7 Coronation Street between April and August 1990 with Jenny Bradley (Sally Ann Matthews). She moved to London from Pakistan when she was young and her along with her sister Joanne Khan (Tania Rodrigues) were the first of their family to be raised in the UK. Her and Jenny both moved into No. 7 after they left their halls and Jenny's foster mother Rita Fairclough (Barbara Knox) was moving into 10a Coronation Street, which was the apartment above the new premises for her shop The Kabin. Flick then remained in France after travelling there with no on-screen departure.

== Marie Ramsden ==
Marie Ramsden
- Coronation Street character
- Portrayed by: Joy Blakeman
- First appearance: 26 February 1990
- Last appearance: 25 December 1990
In-universe information
- Brothers: Carl Lancaster
- Husband: Eddie Ramsden (1990-present)
- Sons: Jamie Ramsden

Marie Ramsden (née Lancaster) was the mother of Jamie Ramsden, who was born in 1988. She ended her relationship with his father Eddie Ramsden due to her suffering with PND. She then dumped Jamie on Eddie in November 1989, but after seeing a psychiatrist she wanted to regain custody of Jamie. Eddie, not wanting to lose custody of Jamie, decided to marry Marie so he had rights, but they ended up splitting again by November 1990 as he was serving a prison sentence.

== Nigel Chadwick ==
Nigel Chadwick
- Coronation Street character
- Portrayed by: Richard Redpath
- Duration: 1990, 1992
- First appearance: 1 April 1990
- Last appearance: 28 October 1992
- Introduced by: Mervyn Watson (1990); Carolyn Reynolds (1992)
In-universe information
- Occupation: Student; Paperboy
- Father: Bob Chadwick
- Mother: Mrs Chadwick

Nigel Chadwick was a paperboy for The Kabin in 1990, but was forced to give it up by his father due to a burglary at Percy Sugden (Bill Waddington)'s house, which made him believe that he was seen as a suspect. He had resumed his paper round in 1992, but got many complaints due to mix ups.

== Dave Barton ==
Dave Barton
- Coronation Street character
- Portrayed by: David Beckett
- First appearance: 2 April 1990
- Last appearance: 14 September 1990
- Introduced by: Mervyn Watson
In-universe information
- Occupation: Joiner

Dave Barton, played by David Beckett, was a joiner who worked for Maurice Jones on his new developments. He also did some work at No. 4 Coronation Street for Deirdre Barlow (Anne Kirkbride), whom he struck up a friendship and later a relationship with. David Beckett who played Barton and Anne Kirkbride who played Deirdre ended up in a relationship in real life, and later married in 1992. They remained married until Kirkbride's death in 2015.

== Brenda Taylor ==
Brenda Taylor
- Coronation Street character
- Portrayed by: Marlene Sidaway
- Duration: 1990–1992
- First appearance: 6 June 1990
- Last appearance: 25 November 1992
- Introduced by: Mervyn Watson (1990); Carolyn Reynolds (1992)
In-universe information
- Husband: Randolph Taylor
- Daughters: Kimberley Taylor

Brenda Taylor was the mother of Kimberley Taylor (Suzanne Hall) who disapproved of her relationship with Curly Watts (Kevin Kennedy) due to her strict church-going Christian lifestyle. As a result, she always saw any of Kimberley's boyfriends as a threat as they wanted her to save herself until marriage. When Curly reconciled with Kimberley in 1992 through a dating agency and got engaged again, Brenda returned and still didn't like Curly.

== Randolph Taylor ==
Randolph Taylor
- Coronation Street character
- Portrayed by: John Jardine
- Duration: 1990, 1992
- First appearance: 11 June 1990
- Last appearance: 25 November 1992
- Introduced by: Mervyn Watson (1990); Carolyn Reynolds (1992)
In-universe information
- Wife: Brenda Taylor
- Daughters: Kimberley Taylor

Randolph Taylor was the father of Kimberley Taylor (Suzanne Hall). Unlike his wife, who henpecked him a lot, he was more amiable towards Kimberley's fiancé, Curly Watts (Kevin Kennedy). Randolph returned in 1992 when Kimberley and Curly reconciled through a dating agency and planned to marry in April 1993, which had been pushed back due to Randolph's hernia. However, the wedding didn't go ahead as Kimberley broke the engagement off once again. Randolph was Jardine's second role in the soap after playing Barry Platt, father of Martin Platt (Sean Wilson), a role which was recast in 1991 and replaced with Richard Conway.

== Sue Jeffers ==
Sue Jeffers
- Coronation Street character
- Portrayed by: Romy Baskerville
- Duration: 1990–1994, 1996–1997
- First appearance: 25 June 1990
- Last appearance: 14 March 1997
- Introduced by: Mervyn Watson (1990); Sue Pritchard (1996)
In-universe information
- Occupation: Headteacher
- Husband: Geoff Jeffers

Sue Jeffers was the headteacher of Weatherfield High, who appeared on a recurring basis across the 1990s and dealt with many different situations. In June 1990, she first appeared when Deirdre Barlow (Anne Kirkbride) wanted to discuss the impact that her husband, Ken Barlow (William Roache) had on their daughter, Tracy Barlow (Dawn Acton) whilst working there as they were going through a divorce. She then appeared later in the year when she tried to get Phil Jennings' company PJ Leisure to sponsor the school football team. In 1991, she made Andy McDonald (Nicholas Cochrane pay back money he made on a book that other pupils placed bets on. In 1992, she appeared when talking to Paula Maxwell about her failing her A-Levels. She recruited Derek Wilton (Peter Baldwin) as the school caretaker in December 1992, but sacked him in 1994 after falling asleep on the job. She returned again in 1996 when she leaned on Ken for comfort after her husband left her for another woman.

== Jackie Ingram ==
Jackie Ingram
- Coronation Street character
- Portrayed by: Shirin Taylor
- Duration: 1990–1992
- First appearance: 8 August 1990
- Last appearance: 15 June 1992
- Introduced by: Mervyn Watson (1990); Carolyn Reynolds (1992)
In-universe information
- Occupation: Businesswoman
- Husband: Peter Ingram (until 1990); Mike Baldwin (1990–1991)
- Stepsons: Danny Baldwin (1991); Mark Redman (1991)

Jacqueline Rachel "Jackie" Ingram (formerly Baldwin), played by Shirin Taylor, made her first screen appearance on 8 August 1990 and departed on 24 July 1991, later returning for two episodes on 13 April and 15 June 1992.

Jackie was Peter Ingram's widow who fell for Mike Baldwin's charms and became his second wife. The marriage lasted a week before Jackie discovered he had only been after her money and had used some of it to help out his ex-girlfriend, Alma Sedgewick. She threatened Mike with her shotgun before leaving him. Mike was given a tidy sum of money as a pay-off for a quick divorce.

== Angie Freeman ==
Angie Freeman
- Coronation Street character
- Portrayed by: Deborah McAndrew
- Duration: 1990–1993, 1996–1998
- First appearance: 8 October 1990
- Last appearance: 10 April 1998
- Introduced by: Mervyn Watson (1990); Sue Pritchard (1996)
In-universe information
- Father: Geoffrey Freeman
- Mother: Ann Freeman

Angela "Angie" Freeman moved into 7 Coronation Street to share with Jenny Bradley, into the room vacated by Flick and Joanne Khan. She was a free-spirited student studying design at University and a woman who knew her own mind. In March 1991, Curly Watts moved in and they quickly became very close – but more as brother and sister than lovers, until one night when they had too much red wine and ended up in bed together. Both regretted it the next morning, but Curly always hoped that their relationship might develop into something more. After graduating, Angie was short of work, and worked unhappily for Mike Baldwin, and more happily for Hanif Ruparell. She found another soulmate in Des Barnes, but went on to have a rather confused and painful romance with Neil Mitchell.

When she left Weatherfield for Mexico in March 1993 to study Aztec design, she left behind a few broken hearts.

In December 1996, she called back on Weatherfield as a designer for Kbec – much to the annoyance of her former boss, Mike Baldwin, but Kbec troubles meant that by the following March they were both no longer in Kbec's employ. Angie returned to Weatherfield, and rented Des Barnes's house while he was on his canal barge, with the intention of setting up her own business.

== Phil Jennings ==
Phil Jennings
- Coronation Street character
- Portrayed by: Tommy Boyle
- Duration: 1990–1991
- First appearance: 19 September 1990
- Last appearance: 29 July 1991
- Introduced by: Mervyn Watson
In-universe information
- Occupation: Businessman
- Wife: Valerie Jennings

Phil Jennings, played by Tommy Boyle, was a businessman who owned PJ Leisure, which owned a chain of arcades. In 1991, he bought Unit 14 Coronation Street off Maurice Jones and began PJ Promotions, which Deirdre Barlow (Anne Kirkbride) ran as an equal partner. After a few failures, Phil and his wife, Valerie left the country to flee debt collectors.

== Rosie Webster ==
Rosie Webster was born on screen during the episode broadcast on 25 December 1990. She was played by Emma Collinge until 27 December 1999, before Helen Flanagan took over the role from 23 January 2000. Rosie's storylines have included the effect that parental separation has upon a child, leading to a spell as a school bully, her rivalry with younger sister Sophie, being kidnapped by John Stape (Graeme Hawley), and her modelling ambitions. Flanagan announced her decision to leave the show in October 2011, and Rosie departed on 10 February 2012. After a five-year absence, the character returned in the episode broadcast on 6 February 2017.

== David Platt ==
David was born on 25 December 1990, and was played by Thomas Ormson until 15 March 2000. Jack P. Shepherd succeeded Ormson in the role and made his first on screen appearance as David on 26 April 2000. David is the only child of Martin and Gail Platt (Sean Wilson and Helen Worth), although Gail had two children from her first marriage. David's storylines have included his sibling rivalry with half sister Sarah, his teenage rebellion, his relationship with Tina McIntyre (Michelle Keegan), his marriage to Kylie Turner (Paula Lane), fatherhood, and his rivalry with Kylie's ex-partner and Max's dad Callum Logan (Sean Ward). David was a central character in the show's third live episode, which was aired to commemorate 60 years of ITV.
