= Des Barnes =

Fictional character from Coronation Street

- Coronation Street character
- Portrayed by: Philip Middlemiss
- Duration: 1990–1998
- First appearance: Episode 3030; 12 February 1990
- Last appearance: Episode 4510; 18 November 1998
- Introduced by: Mervyn Watson
In-universe information
- Occupation: Bookmaker
- Father: Bob Barnes
- Mother: Pat Barnes
- Brothers: Colin Barnes
- Wife: Steph Jones (1990–1994); Natalie Horrocks (1998)
- Stepsons: Tony Horrocks

Des Barnes is a fictional character from the English ITV soap opera Coronation Street, played by Philip Middlemiss.

== Storylines ==
Des is deeply in love with his wife Steph Barnes (Amelia Bullmore), but she does not seem to care as deeply for him, and eventually leaves him for another man. Des had been building a boat in the back garden for years, and the date of the launch coincides with Steph leaving him. He burns the boat on a canal.

When Terry Duckworth (Nigel Pivaro) is in prison, Des offers his back garden to his ex-wife Lisa Duckworth (Caroline Milmoe) for their son Tommy to play in. His relationship with Lisa gradually strengthens until Terry's mother, Vera (Elizabeth Dawn), tells Terry that Des and Lisa are spending time together. Terry subsequently arranges for some criminal associates outside prison to beat Des. Lisa finds out that Terry is behind the beating and declares her marriage to Terry is over, and moves back to Blackpool with her parents. Des visits Lisa several times, then asks her to move back to Weatherfield with him. Vera is furious, wrongfully accusing Des of breaking up her son's marriage and referring to him as a bookie's runner.

Lisa is killed in February 1993 when she is run over by a car whilst crossing the street from the Rovers. Des is affected a lot more than Terry. Tommy goes to live with Lisa's parents in Blackpool, but Des still sees him when they bring him to Weatherfield to visit Vera and her husband Jack (Bill Tarmey).

After Lisa's death, Des begins dating Raquel Wolstenhulme (Sarah Lancashire). She eventually moves in with him, but she knows that he is never going to ask for her hand in marriage, breaking their relationship. However, the two are reconciled when Des advises against her seeing someone she had met on a modelling assignment. Soon after, Des embarks on an affair with Tanya Pooley (Eva Pope), who is dating Des's boss, Alex Christie (Gavin Richards) at the time. Tanya cannot resist Des and sees it as an opportunity to get at Raquel, whom she does not like and often bullies. One night, Des goes to see Tanya and finds Alex with her. During the resulting fight between the two men, Raquel arrives and discovers the affair.

Raquel later gets engaged to Curly Watts (Kevin Kennedy). Des appears at their party and forces Raquel to admit that she does not really love Curly, and Raquel later breaks off their engagement but refuses reconciliation with Des.

After this, Andy McDonald (Nicholas Cochrane) moves in as a lodger. Their friendship turns sour when Des starts making offensive jokes about his family's criminality and asks Andy to leave.

Des then dates a young widow, Claire Palmer (Maggie Norris). They have brief meetings during their lunch breaks as Claire is trying to get her daughter, Becky (Emily Aston), used to the idea of her mother dating another man. Des wants Claire to take a boating holiday with him, and Becky thinks that it is a good idea and wants to go too. Becky accepts Des and when they return from the boat trip Claire and Becky move in with Des, even though this means that Claire loses her widow's pension.

In 1997, Des is talked into making a parachute jump with his boss Sean Skinner (Terence Hillyer) and Samantha Failsworth (Tina Hobley), the Rovers barmaid that Sean has been dating. Due to an ankle injury, Sean is unable to take part in the jump. Des and Samantha are pleased that they have made the jump successful, and later the same day, Des makes a pass at Samantha. She manipulates Des by pretending to reciprocate his feelings and has him remove his trousers. She throws his trousers out of the window and pushes Des out of the front door in full view of Claire, Rita Sullivan (Barbara Knox), and Mavis Wilton (Thelma Barlow).

Claire and Becky subsequently move out, and Sean fires Des from his job. Humiliated and ashamed, Des decides to leave Weatherfield. He rents his house out to Angie Freeman (Deborah McAndrew), buys himself a new boat, and leaves, with Derek Wilton (Peter Baldwin) giving him a fond farewell.

However, Des returns to the Street soon after in July. Des is upset to find that Derek has died. He also finds Angie has moved mechanic Chris Collins (Matthew Marsden) into the house with her. At first, Des does not approve, but eventually accepts Chris.

In August, Des makes another pass at Samantha, and this time she genuinely accepts him. She is able to be consoled by Des, confessing to him her innermost feelings, including telling him of her rape ordeal, which she had never spoken about to anyone before. Des is angry when Samantha sleeps with her ex-husband Ritchie (Shaun Dooley), but she later divorces him, and Des forgives her. Samantha later cheats on Des with Chris, and their relationship ends.

Thereafter Des begins dating Natalie Horrocks (Denise Welch) and the pair get engaged. Samantha grows jealous and tells Des that she is pregnant with his child and has had an abortion. Des discovers that Samantha had been lying about the pregnancy but she then tells him that she had suffered a miscarriage. Samantha then tells Des again that she had been lying and that she is still pregnant with his child before proceeding to leave Weatherfield shortly afterwards. Although Natalie firmly believes Samantha had been lying, Des is never sure of whether he has become a father or not. Regardless, Des and Natalie happily get married before they move in together.

In November 1998 just weeks later, he discovers that Natalie's son Tony (Lee Warburton) has been involved in drug dealing. The couple confront Tony over his actions and he admits to being in debt to a gang of drug dealers ever since he previously left the street over a year ago. Then one night, Des walks into the living room of his home to find Tony being attacked by the gang he is hiding from. When Des tries to stop the men from attacking his stepson, he is knocked unconscious and rushed to hospital. He appears to be recovering and regains consciousness in hospital but then suffers a heart attack and dies.

Following Des' death, Natalie blames Tony for causing his demise and proceeds to disown her son after mourning Des at his funeral; Tony would later be killed by the gang's leader Jez Quigley (Lee Boardman) after the latter tracks him down. Tony's fate would not be discovered until Spring 2000, during which Natalie learns that Jez not only killed Tony but was also responsible for Des' murder too. Eventually, however, Jez is killed after being violently brutalized by Des' neighbour Jim McDonald (Charles Lawson) in retaliation for putting his son Steve (Simon Gregson) in hospital. Natalie would then leave the street on New Year's Eve 2000 to start anew after properly mourning Des and laying the ghosts to rest.

== Reception ==
Des's character was, during his time on the soap, described as "the self-pitying Geordie of Coronation Street who hit his boss when he found him in bed with his girlfriend". A writer from ITV Hub put Des on their list of Liz' top ten lovers, writing, "Liz worked for Des in the Bookies'. They shared a kiss but Liz resisted taking things further and quit her job to stay faithful to Jim. But Jim's suspicions were aroused and their marriage was afflicted by the lack of trust stirred up."
