= List of Coronation Street characters introduced in 1989 =

The following is a list of characters that first appeared in the ITV soap opera Coronation Street in 1989, by order of first appearance.

== Dawn Prescott ==
Dawn Prescott
- Coronation Street character
- Portrayed by: Louise Harrison
- First appearance: Episode 2905; 30 January 1989
- Last appearance: Episode 2999; 1 December 1989
- Introduced by: Mervyn Watson
In-universe information
- Occupation: Shop Assistant
- Brothers: Robert Prescott

Dawn Prescott, portrayed by Louise Harrison, was a shop assistant at Weatherfield Security Systems when Alan Bradley first opened the shop. She worked alongside him and Martin Platt and her duties were to manage the shop whilst Alan and Martin were on call-outs. Dawn found herself in a messy situation when she realised that Alan got the money to set up the shop from a mortgage he had taken out of No. 7 Coronation Street in the name of Rita's dead ex-husband Len Fairclough and had the letters addressed to the shop so she wouldn't find out. Alan subsequently attempted to rape Dawn, but she luckily elbowed him and ran off. He denied any allegations made against him and made it clear it was his word against hers. Alan was subsequently charged for defrauding Rita with the mortgage money. After leaving the security business, she worked as an estate agent and showed Mike Baldwin and Alma Sedgewick around a new flat on a new dockside development known as Weatherfield Quays. She subsequently dated Mike and ended up getting business dealings with Maurice Jones.

== Alison Oakley ==
Alison Oakley
- Coronation Street character
- Portrayed by: Helen Swift (1989); Shelley Willetts (1998)
- Duration: 1989, 1998
- First appearance: Episode 2948; 15 February 1989
- Last appearance: Episode 7990; 24 May 1998
- Introduced by: Mervyn Watson (1989); Brian Park (1998)

Alison Oakley, played by Helen Swift in 1989 and Shelley Willetts in 1998, is a woman who Brian Tilsley meets in a nightclub on 15 February 1989 after splitting from his wife Gail. Brian tries to defend Alison against three young thugs who begin harassing her, which results in Brian being fatally stabbed. In her first appearance, she is only credited as "Disco Girl" and not by her name. Nine years later, Brian's son Nick seeks her out at a bar to learn the truth about Brian's death. Alison reveals that Brian had goaded his killer, shattering Nick's illusion of his father.

== Darren Whateley ==
Darren Whateley
- Coronation Street character
- Portrayed by: Ian Aspinall (1989); Andy Robb (1998)
- Duration: 1989, 1998
- First appearance: Episode 2948; 15 February 1989
- Last appearance: Episode 4423; 19 June 1998
- Introduced by: Mervyn Watson (1989); Brian Park (1998)

Darren Whateley, played by Ian Aspinall in 1989 and Andy Robb in 1998, is Brian Tilsley's killer who stabs him when he defends Alison Oakley, a girl he has met at a club, from Darren and two friends. Darren stabs Brian in the abdomen whilst his friends hold him against a wall and leaves him to die in an alleyway. In his first appearance, he is only credited as "Disco Youth" and not by his name. He is subsequently found guilty of murder and sentenced to life imprisonment. Darren reappears in Weatherfield in 1998, by which time he is about to be paroled from his life sentence, when he appears at Brian's son, Nick's college as a guest speaker talking about life in prison. Nick, who was eight years old at the time of the murder, then realises that he is his father's killer. Nick then writes to Darren pretending to be his wife Leanne in order to trap him; however, this backfires, when Leanne's life is endangered after Darren arrives at her home. Leanne and Nick report Darren to the police and he is arrested and his parole is rescinded. He is subsequently returned to prison. However, Leanne and Nick's mother, Gail, later force Nick to tell the police that he set Darren up.

== Tom Casey ==
Tom Casey
- Coronation Street character
- Portrayed by: Edward Clayton
- Duration: 1989–1990
- First appearance: Episode 2915; 6 March 1989
- Last appearance: Episode 3136; 19 October 1990
- Introduced by: Mervyn Watson
In-universe information
- Occupation: Garage Owner
- Wife: Jean Casey
- Sons: Mark Casey

Tom Casey, played by Edward Clayton, was the owner of Casey's Autos. The garage was Tilsley's Autos, which he bought after Brian Tilsley's murder in February 1989. After Brian's death, the garage was being managed by Kevin Webster. A few weeks later, Tom brought his son Mark to work at the garage as he was eager for him to learn the ropes. Tom last appeared at Mark's 21st Birthday party, where he gave him Casey's Autos as a present, but being inexperienced in the business, by the end of 1991, Mark had run the business into the ground.

== Tina Fowler ==
Tina Fowler
- Coronation Street character
- Portrayed by: Michelle Holmes
- Duration: 1989–1990
- First appearance: Episode 2917; 13 March 1989
- Last appearance: Episode 3116; 3 September 1990
- Introduced by: Mervyn Watson
In-universe information
- Occupation: Barmaid

Tina Fowler, played by Michelle Holmes, made her first screen appearance on 13 March 1989. Tina was employed as a barmaid in The Rovers Return following the departure of Gloria Todd (Sue Jenkins). She was interviewed by landlady Bet Gilroy (Julie Goodyear) in the pub during opening hours and given the job shortly afterwards. Curly Watts (Kevin Kennedy) set his sights on Tina; however, she rejected him. Rovers cellarman Jack Duckworth (Bill Tarmey) became infatuated with Tina; she kept Jack at bay until one day when, for a laugh, she agreed to go out with him on what Jack thought was a date. Tina was happy to spend Jack's money but when he tried to get frisky with her she demanded he drive her home. Jack's wife Vera (Liz Dawn) was furious when she found out about Jack and Tina's "date" and was even more furious when Tina revealed that she only went out with him for a joke which resulted in Vera throwing a pint which missed Tina and drenched landlord Alec Gilroy (Roy Barraclough).

Tina won the 'Newton & Ridley's Barmaid of the Month' competition. Tina almost didn't receive the award when she got into a row with Alec. She got revenge by arriving late, making Alec worry that she wouldn't turn up and embarrass the Rovers. The award was presented by Nigel Ridley (John Basham), who was impressed by the young barmaid and started seeing her in secret. As Nigel was a top brewery director, Tina thought she'd struck gold and started taking liberties at work by not turning up for shifts and demanding a raise. Alec wanted to sack her for that alone, but Bet stopped him after seeing Nigel and Tina kissing. However, when Tina, bored of Percy Sugden (Bill Waddington)'s war stories, told the pensioner that he was barred, Bet sacked her on the spot herself. Tina later saw Nigel at a wine bar to complain about the Gilroys; she found him with a girlfriend and, realising she meant nothing to him, threw a glass of wine over him.

== Mark Casey ==
Mark Casey
- Coronation Street character
- Portrayed by: Stuart Wolfenden
- Duration: 1989–1991
- First appearance: Episode 2923; 3 April 1989
- Last appearance: Episode 3303; 11 November 1991
- Introduced by: Mervyn Watson
In-universe information
- Occupation: Mechanic; Garage Owner
- Father: Tom Casey
- Mother: Jean Casey

Mark Casey, played by Stuart Wolfenden, was a mechanic who worked at his father Tom's garage, Casey's Autos. He was the only son of Tom and Jean Casey. He became friends with Kevin Webster and worked with him at the garage until 1990 when he was given the garage for his 21st birthday. He dated many people whilst working there, including Jenny Bradley and her housemate Flick Khan. When he took over the garage, he eventually sacked Kevin for doing cars that belonged to foreigners and due to his inexperience as a businessman, he ran the business into the ground and by the end of 1991, he leaned on Kevin's wife Sally Webster to see if she could persuade Kevin to help him out by giving him a job, but he decided he was not prepared to help him. Mark was Wolfenden's second role in the soap after playing a paper deliverer Craig Russell in 1986 and then returned in 2015 as Greig Hodge, however Mark was his only regular role.

== Nigel Ridley ==
Nigel Ridley
- Coronation Street character
- Portrayed by: John Basham
- Duration: 1989–1990
- First appearance: Episode 2940; 31 May 1989
- Last appearance: Episode 3116; 3 September 1990
- Introduced by: Mervyn Watson
In-universe information
- Occupation: Chief Executive
- Father: Patrick Ridley
- Brothers: Hugh Ridley
- Uncles: Hubert Ridley

Nigel Ridley, played by John Basham, is the son of Patrick Ridley and was appointed the Chief executive of the Newtown and Ridley brewery after Cecil Newton retired to the Isle of Man. In 1990, Ridley introduced the Theme Pub scheme, which clashed with Alec Gilroy. Tina Fowler won the 'Newton & Ridley's Barmaid of the Month' competition. Tina almost didn't receive the award when she got into a row with Alec. She got revenge by arriving late, making Alec worry that she wouldn't turn up and embarrass the Rovers. The award was presented by Nigel, who was impressed by the young barmaid and started seeing her in secret. As Nigel was a top brewery director, Tina thought she'd struck gold and started taking liberties at work by not turning up for shifts and demanding a raise. Alec wanted to sack her for that alone, but Bet stopped him after seeing Nigel and Tina kissing. However, when Tina, bored of Percy Sugden (Bill Waddington)'s war stories, told the pensioner that he was barred, Bet sacked her on the spot herself. Tina later saw Nigel at a wine bar to complain about the Gilroys; she found him with a girlfriend and, realising she meant nothing to him, threw a glass of wine over him.

== Jean Casey ==
Jean Casey
- Coronation Street character
- Portrayed by: Mary Cunningham
- Duration: 1989–1990
- First appearance: Episode 2945; 19 June 1989
- Last appearance: Episode 3135; 17 October 1990
- Introduced by: Mervyn Watson
In-universe information
- Occupation: Garage Owner
- Husband: Tom Casey
- Sons: Mark Casey

Jean Casey, played by Mary Cunningham, was the wife of Tom and mother of Mark. Her husband owned Casey's Autos and when he was not able to run his business, she knew enough about the trade to be able to run it herself. She first appears in June 1989 when she tries to convince garage manager, Kevin Webster not to encourage Mark's interest in banger racing. She last appeared at Mark's 21st birthday party when Tom gave him the garage as a birthday present, which he ends up driving into the ground by the end of 1991 due to his lack of experience in running a business.

== Wendy Crozier ==
Wendy Crozier
- Coronation Street character
- Portrayed by: Roberta Kerr
- Duration: 1989–1990, 2012, 2022
- First appearance: Episode 2948; 28 June 1989
- Last appearance: Episode 10,822; 14 December 2022
- Introduced by: Mervyn Watson (1989); Phil Collinson (2012); Iain MacLeod (2022)
In-universe information
- Occupation: Council secretary Journalist; Foster carer
- Stepmother: Sylvia Crozier
- Husband: Christos Papadopoulos (1991–2006)

Wendy Papadopoulos (also Crozier), played by Roberta Kerr, made her first screen appearance on 28 June 1989. Wendy worked for the council and had an affair with Ken Barlow (William Roache), which led to his divorce from his wife, Deirdre (Anne Kirkbride).

When Mervyn Watson joined Coronation Street as their new producer, he felt that the serial "needed gee-ing up slightly" and set about making changes. He implemented many fast-paced stories, including Wendy and Ken's affair. The storyline began in September 1989, when Wendy is fired from her job at the Town Hall after she leaks information to Ken. He subsequently offers Wendy a job working for his newspaper the Recorder. By October the pair had begun an affair. Kirkbride told Daran Little in his book The Coronation Street Story that she and Roache were upset by the storyline because it ruined their routine. Roache said that he had a hard time understanding why Ken would be unfaithful again. Wendy and Ken's relationship failed and he attempted to reunite with Deirdre. Wendy departed on 7 May 1990.

On 13 July 2012, it was announced Kerr had reprised her role and Wendy would be returning to Coronation Street later in the year. Wendy reappears again as a potential governor for Bessie Street Primary School and she discovers she is up against Ken for the role. The former couple get reacquainted, but Ken decides to keep Wendy a secret from Deirdre. Of Wendy's return, series producer Phil Collinson stated "Ken's affair with Wendy was one of Coronation Street's defining stories during the 1980s. Viewers were on the edge of their seats as they watched the disintegration of The Barlows' marriage and over 20 years later I hope they will be again. I'm delighted to welcome Roberta back as Wendy and can assure viewers that her reunion with Ken will be one of many must-see storylines this summer" Wendy returned on 24 September 2012.

While working as a secretary for the council's Planning Committee, Wendy begins leaking information about corruption to Ken, owner of the Weatherfield Recorder. Ken's wife, Deirdre, who is a councillor, finds out about the leaks and warns Ken and Wendy to stay away from each other. When Deirdre is threatened with removal from the committee, she exposes Wendy as Ken's mole. Consequently, Wendy is sacked from her job. Feeling responsible, Ken gives Wendy a position with the newspaper. Ken and Wendy grow closer and they share a kiss when she cooks him a meal for his birthday. They eventually begin an affair and Wendy decides to leave the newspaper so Ken can use the excuse of having to run the office by himself to stay out late. Wendy starts asking Ken to tell Deirdre about their affair and Ken agrees. However, he does not tell Deirdre and Wendy briefly stops seeing Ken. Deirdre finds out about the affair and throws Ken out. Wendy takes him in and helps him run the newspaper, while he sorts out his finances and the divorce. Deirdre demands half of the Weatherfield Recorder's profits and Ken sells the paper to the Gazette. He and Wendy are kept on in their jobs by the new owners. Wendy forms a bond with Ken's daughter Tracy (Dawn Acton). Wendy is offered Ken's job when he leaves the paper and their relationship eventually breaks down. Wendy asks Ken to meet her stepmother, Sylvia (Avril Angers), but they end up arguing in front of her. Ken becomes depressed and admits to Wendy that he should not have left Deirdre for her. He then walks out on Wendy.

Twenty-two years later, Ken runs for the Chair of Governors at Bessie Street School and is shocked to learn Wendy is also a governor at the school. Things between them are initially awkward, but they go for a drink and agree to put the past behind them and focus on the school. Wendy tells Ken that a year after they parted, she married a man called Christos Papadopoulos and moved to Norfolk. However, Christos got sick and died fifteen years later, so Wendy moved back to Manchester. Now remarried to Deirdre, Ken initially tries to keep Wendy's return a secret from her, but she suspects something and follows him to Wendy's house. When Deirdre confronts Ken, he assures her the relationship is purely professional, with Deirdre reluctantly accepting this. However, Wendy later misconstrues Ken's friendliness and makes a pass at him. Ken politely but firmly turns her down, reasserting his love for Deirdre.

In 2022, Abi Webster (Sally Carman) is placed under the supervision of Wendy - now an experienced foster carer - as part of her attempt to regain custody of her infant son, Alfie. Wendy is unnerved to hear Abi lives on Coronation Street and tries to hide her reluctance to accompany Abi to visit her husband, Kevin Webster (Michael Le Vell). Abi notices Wendy is uncomfortable on the street, and is shocked when they run into Tracy and she is abusive to Wendy, demanding she stays away. Wendy later admits to Abi that she has 'history' with Ken. After being encouraged by Abi to go and see Ken, she pays a visit to No. 1 and the two agree to put things behind them and become friends. She later develops feelings for Ken and after realising that he feels the same way about her, they decide to rekindle their relationship. Following the return of Ken's ex-lover Martha Fraser, she ends their relationship, having felt a lack of romance between them.

== Maurice Jones ==
Maurice Jones
- Coronation Street character
- Portrayed by: Alan Moore
- Duration: 1989–1990
- First appearance: Episode 2954; 19 July 1989
- Last appearance: Episode 3035; 23 February 1990
- Introduced by: Mervyn Watson
In-universe information
- Occupation: Property Developer
- Wife: Carol Jones
- Daughters: Steph Barnes

Maurice Jones, portrayed by Alan Moore, was a property developer who built the east side of Coronation Street in 1990. He was also the father of Steph Barnes and father-in-law to Des Barnes. In February 1990, his new properties were completed. These included house numbers 2-8, a corner shop, a garage and factory. No. 6 was sold at cost to the recently married Des and Steph. Rita Fairclough bought the shop unit and The Kabin moved there from the premises on Rosamund Street. No. was sold to Derek and Mavis Wilton and No. 8 was sold to newlyweds Gail and Martin Platt. Mike Baldwin bought the garage unit and Phil Jennings bought the factory. It was believed that Maurice died sometime around 2008.

== Josie Phillips ==
Josie Phillips
- Coronation Street character
- Portrayed by: Siobhan Finneran
- Duration: 1989–1990
- First appearance: Episode 2958; 2 August 1989
- Last appearance: Episode 3038; 3 March 1990
- Introduced by: Mervyn Watson
In-universe information
- Occupation: Factory Worker

Josie Phillips, portrayed by Siobhan Finneran, was a packer at Baldwin's Casuals who then transferred to the sewing room after the departure of Shirley Armitage. Shortly afterwards, rumours began to spread that the factory was due to close. As a result, she confronts her boss Mike Baldwin regarding these rumours. He reassured her that her job was safe but didn't believe him and was proven right when Mike sold the factory to Maurice Jones, who demolished it to build a new development. In January 1990, Josie was re-employed by Mike as part of an operation to manufacture bags for distributor Peter Ingram using outworkers, however Mike tricked her into doing so, saying he had got Ivy Brennan to do it too. Josie had threatened to quit, but backed down when Mike agreed to employ Ivy too. However, Ivy decided not to work for Mike again afterwards.

== Reg Holdsworth ==
Reg Holdsworth
- Coronation Street character
- Portrayed by: Ken Morley
- Duration: 1989–1995
- First appearance: Episode 2983; 25 October 1989
- Last appearance: Episode 3939; 24 November 1995
- Introduced by: Mervyn Watson
- Spin-off appearances: Coronation Street After Hours (1999); Coronation Street: A Knight's Tale (2010)
- Crossover appearances: Emmerdale: Don't Look Now! – The Dingles in Venice (1999)
In-universe information
- Occupation: Supermarket manager
- Wife: Veronica Hardback (1989–1991); Maureen Naylor (1994–1996)

Reginald "Reg" Holdsworth, played by Ken Morley, made his first screen appearance on 25 October 1989.

Supermarket manager Reg was married to Veronica; however, she left him after discovering his affair with a store detective. Rather than slink off wounded into the sunset, Reg approached several of the single women of Coronation Street, starting with Rita Fairclough. They attended a couple of tea dances together and struck up a friendship. To secure his relationship with Rita, Reg rigged a trolley race at the supermarket so that Rita would be the winner. When Rita discovered this, she dropped him and donated the trolley race winnings to a local charity.

In 1993, Reg recognised his former girlfriend Maureen Naylor, stacking shelves at Bettabuys. They had first met in Llandudno in 1968 and fallen in love. Now, after 25 years, they began a new relationship. However, Maureen's mother, Maud Grimes, had always disliked Reg, and tried to break up their relationship. Reg, desperate to consummate the relationship, finally lured Maureen to his waterbed, which burst and flooded the shop below. Reg and Maureen married in January 1994 and bought the corner shop from Alf Roberts for £68,000. Maureen managed the shop with her mother behind the till. The three lived in relative harmony – Reg as a member of the Square Dealers – until he was posted by Firman's Freezers to their Lowestoft branch, which meant a long commute. There, he began another affair, with Yvonne Bannister. Reg left the street and a heartbroken Maureen behind, to start a new life with Yvonne who was pregnant with his child.

Morley later crossed over his role of Reg into the 1999 Emmerdale video spin-off Emmerdale: Don't Look Now! – The Dingles in Venice. He also reprised the role in 2010 for the DVD special A Knight's Tale, in which he worked for former colleague Curly Watts as an event planner at Tatlock Towers, a medieval castle and tourist attraction. He got sacked after an incident at the event, but was rehired again by Curly. He was attracted to Mary Taylor, who in a December 2010 episode received a Christmas card from him.

== Kimberley Taylor ==
Kimberley Taylor
- Coronation Street character
- Portrayed by: Suzanne Hall
- Duration: 1989–1992
- First appearance: Episode 2983; 25 October 1989
- Last appearance: Episode 3469; 27 November 1992
- Introduced by: Mervyn Watson (1989); Carolyn Reynolds (1992)
In-universe information
- Occupation: Shop Assistant
- Father: Randolph Taylor
- Mother: Brenda Taylor

Kimberley Taylor, played by Suzanne Hall, was a shop assistant at Bettabuys between 1989 and 1991. She was the only child of Randolph and Brenda Taylor and had a strict, sheltered upbringing as they were both regular church-goers. Whilst working at Bettabuys, she built a relationship with Curly Watts and they eventually got engaged, but Kimberley broke it off when Curly tried to push for sex outside of marriage. After the breakdown of the engagement, Kimberley was transferred to another store. Kimberley left the series in 1991, but returned a year later when her and Curly reunited through a dating agency. They ended up splitting again, but this time for good as Curly spent £2000 to convert his loft into an observatory against Kimberley's wishes.

== Liz McDonald ==
Liz McDonald, played by Beverley Callard, made her first screen appearance on 27 October 1989. Callard previously appeared in Coronation Street as June Dewhurst in 1984. A few years later, Callard's agent called and told her that the soap's series producer, Mervyn Watson, wanted her to come in for an audition as he had remembered her. The actress won the regular role of the McDonald family matriarch, Liz. The character was married to Jim McDonald (Charles Lawson) and they had twin sons; Steve (Simon Gregson) and Andy (Nicholas Cochrane). During Liz's tenure, she endured being beaten up by Jim, divorce, catfights and numerous love affairs. The storylines made her "one of the Street's best-loved characters."

== Renee Dodds ==
Renee Dodds
- Coronation Street character
- Portrayed by: Christine Cox
- Duration: 1989–1990
- First appearance: Episode 2985; 30 October 1989
- Last appearance: Episode 3063; 30 April 1990
- Introduced by: Mervyn Watson
In-universe information
- Occupation: Store detective
- Husband: Archie Dodds

Renee Dodds, played by Christine Cox, was a store detective for Bettabuys, who had an affair with Reg Holdsworth, who was a married man. Vera Duckworth began working at Bettabuys in October 1989, but ended up getting into trouble for revealing Renee's identity. She was subsequently dismissed in December, believing it was Renee behind the sacking, but it was actually down to Curly Watts' staff assessments that led to the decision. Curly subsequently discovered Renee and Reg in a stockroom together. The affair was later discovered by Reg's wife, Veronica who threw him out, causing him to sleep in the stockroom. Reg managed to get Veronica's forgiveness and he then moved back in.

== Eddie Ramsden ==
Eddie Ramsden
- Coronation Street character
- Portrayed by: William Ivory
- Duration: 1989–1990
- First appearance: Episode 2986; 1 November 1989
- Last appearance: Episode 3041; 9 March 1990
- Introduced by: Mervyn Watson
In-universe information
- Occupation: Builder
- Mother: Mrs. Ramsden
- Wife: Marie Ramsden (1990-present)
- Sons: Jamie Ramsden

Eddie Ramsden, portrayed by William Ivory, was a builder working for Maurice Jones on his new development. When he first arrived, he had recently split from his girlfriend, Marie Lancaster, by whom he had a son Jamie Ramsden. He caused trouble when he visited the Rovers, where he made a play for Tina Fowler, causing him to be thrown out after Kevin Webster defended her. Eddie got even when he and his mates threw Kevin across a table, nearly causing Alec Gilroy to call the police. Marie, who was suffering with PND, dumped Jamie on Eddie and he began to raise him alongside his mother at 1 Cromwell Street. In January 1990, he embarked on a relationship with Tina, but ended up splitting when Marie demanded Jamie returned to her care, so Eddie decided to marry Marie so he could have parental rights. Eddie departed in March with Marie and Jamie, but by November they had split again and Jamie was in her care as Eddie was serving a prison sentence.

== Jamie Ramsden ==
Jamie Ramsden
- Coronation Street character
- Portrayed by: Alexander Graham
- Duration: 1989–1990
- First appearance: Episode 2996; 24 November 1989
- Last appearance: Episode 3165; 25 December 1990
- Introduced by: Mervyn Watson
In-universe information
- Father: Eddie Ramsden
- Mother: Marie Ramsden
- Grandmothers: Mrs Ramsden
- Uncles: Carl Lancaster

Jamie Ramsden was the son of Eddie, who was initially raising him as a single parent due to his mother, Marie Lancaster was suffering with PND. His father had the help from his grandmother, Mrs Ramsden. However, she subsequently sought after help from a psychiatrist and felt she was in a fit state to look after Jamie again. Jamie's parents subsequently married so Eddie could have parental rights over Jamie, however by November 1990, Marie and Eddie had split once again due to Eddie serving a prison sentence.

== Steve McDonald ==
Steven James "Steve" McDonald, played by Simon Gregson. The character first appeared on screen during the episode airing on 6 December 1989. He arrived as part of the McDonald family introduced by producer Mervyn Watson along with his twin brother Andy (Nicholas Cochrane) and parents Liz (Beverley Callard) and Jim McDonald (Charles Lawson). Steve's storylines include his many marriages to Vicky Arden (Chloe Newsome), Karen Phillips (Suranne Jones) twice, Becky McDonald (Katherine Kelly), Tracy Barlow (Kate Ford) twice, and Michelle Connor (Kym Marsh), as well as Tracy giving birth to his daughter Amy (Elle Mulvaney) and also depression. In September 2015 Gregson announced a break for personal reasons, and Steve was off-screen from October 2015 to 22 April 2016 after going to Spain to visit Andy.

== Andy McDonald ==
Andy McDonald
- Coronation Street character
- Portrayed by: Nicholas Cochrane
- Duration: 1989-1997, 2000, 2004, 2009
- First appearance: Episode 3001; 6 December 1989
- Last appearance: Episode 7145; 20 August 2009
- Introduced by: Mervyn Watson (1989); Jane MacNaught (2000); Kieran Roberts (2004); Kim Crowther (2009)
- Book appearances: Coronation Street:The Complete Saga
In-universe information
- Occupation: English teacher Freelance journalist
- Father: Jim McDonald
- Mother: Liz McDonald
- Stepfather: Vernon Tomlin (2007–2009)
- Brothers: Steve McDonald
- Sisters: Katie McDonald
- Half-brothers: Ben Driscoll
- Grandfathers: Edward McDonald
- Grandmothers: Maisie McDonald
- Aunts: Eileen McDonald
- Nephews: Oliver Battersby; Ruairi McDonald; Ollie Driscoll; Will Driscoll
- Nieces: Amy Barlow; Emma Brooker

Andrew “Andy” McDonald, played by Nicholas Cochrane, debuted on-screen during the episode airing on 6 December 1989. He was a regular character from 1989 until 1997, and made guest appearances in 2000, 2004 and 2009.

Andy was introduced as part of the McDonald family, consisting of parents Liz McDonald (Beverley Callard) and Jim McDonald (Charles Lawson) and their twin teenage boys Andy and Steve McDonald (Simon Gregson). Cochrane and Gregson were chosen by producer Mervyn Watson and casting director James Bain from their school in Manchester. Teachers informed them of the chance to join the cast of Coronation Street and they had photographs taken of themselves. One week later they were called to attend an improvisation session with Callard and Lawson who had already been cast in the parental roles. They chose which two actors they liked the most from thirty that auditioned. While their characters are twins, Cochrane was one year older than Gregson.

Cochrane told a reporter from Look-in that his character is "a bit of a devil [and] a bit of a rogue". Andy has "brains and knows it" but often he does not use them. He added that Andy "always enjoys himself, but hates to be told things. He's a sound character, a bit like me, but with brains." However, Andy got on the actor's nerves at times because he acts "like a wimp and never sticks up for himself". While he is gifted in the "brains department" he is easily led into trouble by Steve. Cochrane explained that the only way to end Andy's "problems" would to be given "a good steady girlfriend to sort him out". Gregson told the writer that "the good thing" about the McDonald brothers is that "they stick up for each other [...] they get on most of the time".

Cochrane's first fight scene as Andy occurred when he and Steve clashed over a girl. The actor was sixteen at the time and he told Paul Byrne from the Daily Mirror that it was his "first taste of proper action". The pair had "great fun" as they memorised fight sequence choreography to make it appear as though Andy and Steve were "having a real go at each other". Cochrane and Gregson ended up damaging the set during filming and incurred costs to the props department.

In one storyline Andy decides to drop out of university. But Jim was not happy with his son's decision and they argued. Cochrane told Rob Sharp in the book The Official 1997 Annual of Coronation Street that he loved arguing with Lawson during filming. He explained that Jim's attitude to his decision "infuriated Andy so much that he turned on his dad and branded him a failure". Cochrane enjoyed the scenes because he felt that it "really pushed" him as an actor. Their relationship came under more strain when Andy began drinking which led his alcoholic father back into drinking. The scenes featured Jim challenging Andy to a drinking session. Cochrane told the Daily Mirror's Byrne that it "really frightened Andy to think his dad was going back on the bottle". The pair end up fighting, Crochane and Lawson had rehearsed the scene prior to the actual shoot. He said that he was "in awe" of Lawson's performance; during the shoot "the adrenaline was pumping" for Cochrane so much that he ripped Lawson's shirt.

In 1997, the serial's new producer axed the character during his revamp of the series. Cochrane was filming a scene in the Rovers Return when he was called in to see Park who informed him that he had lost his job. The actor was being paid £60000 to play Andy and he initially worried about his mortgage. Byrne said that Lawson, Callard and Gregson were supportive towards him after they read about his sacking in the national newspapers. Park informed Cochrane that Andy "was in a rut" and they were "struggling to find storylines" for him. Cochrane admitted that he was already aware of this because Andy "was too much of a goody two-shoes". Park suggested that the character needed a break from the series with possibility of a future return. The actor added that "looking at it now, I realise it is probably best for both me and the character."

He makes occasional returns to his former home, attending remarriage of his parents and the wedding of his twin brother, Steve, where he serves as best man. During his return in 2000 for his parents' wedding he has a one-night stand with Toyah Battersby (Georgia Taylor) and then when he returned in 2004 for Steve and Karen (Suranne Jones)'s wedding he is reprimanded by Toyah's mother Janice (Vicky Entwistle).

In June 2008, Steve goes to Spain to visit Andy for their 34th birthday and returns to the Street in July. Andy does not appear on screen. In April 2009, Liz visits Andy after he has injured himself and stays there for several months. In 2009, Andy and Liz return to the Street for Steve and Becky (Katherine Kelly)'s wedding. He leaves Weatherfield with his dad Jim McDonald (Charles Lawson) a week after the wedding.

== Others ==
| Character | Date(s) | Episode(s) | Actor | Circumstances |
|---|---|---|---|---|
| Jack Croston | 18 January | 2902 | Alan Partington | Elsie Seddon's sister Bertha and her husband Jack appear as moral support for Elsie when her abusive husband Eddie dies in a road accident. The couple are among the few mourners at Eddie's funeral the following week, attending to support Elsie, and went along to a luncheon at 13 Coronation Street organised by Elsie's daughter, Sally Webster afterwards. Reflecting on the service, at which the vicar had praised Eddie's character, Bertha remarks that the vicar could not have known Eddie to say those things about him. Jack then interjects, calling Eddie "a bad 'un", but with respect to Elsie in her time of grief. Under no illusions about the kind of man Eddie was, Elsie admits that they are right but that she misses him anyway. |
| Bertha Croston | 18 January | 2902 | Dinah Handley | |
