= List of Coronation Street characters introduced in 1993 =

The following is a list of characters that first appeared in the ITV soap opera Coronation Street in 1993, by order of first appearance.

== Maureen Holdsworth ==
Maureen Holdsworth
- Coronation Street character
- Portrayed by: Sherrie Hewson
- Duration: 1993–1997, 2006
- First appearance: 12 March 1993
- Last appearance: 27 December 2006
- Introduced by: Carolyn Reynolds (1993); Steve Frost (2006)
In-universe information
- Other names: Maureen Grimes; Maureen Naylor; Maureen Elliott; Maureen Webster
- Father: Leonard Kennedy
- Mother: Maud Grimes
- Stepfather: Wilfred Grimes
- Half-sisters: Peggy Phillips
- Husband: Frank Naylor (backstory); Reg Holdsworth (1994–1996); Fred Elliott (1997–1998); Bill Webster (1998–2007)
- Stepsons: Ashley Peacock (1997–1998); Kevin Webster (1998–2007); Carl Webster (1998–2007)
- Stepdaughters: Debbie Webster (1998–2007)
- Grandfathers: Malcolm Michaelson
- Grandmothers: Beatrice Michaelson

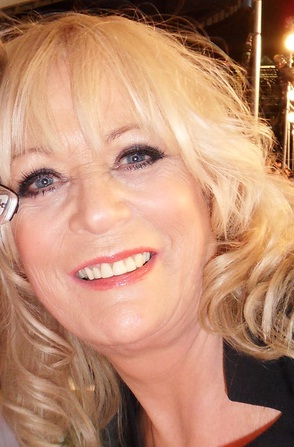
Sherrie Hewson, who portrays Maureen.

Maureen Holdsworth (also Grimes, Naylor, Webster and Elliott) was played by Sherrie Hewson.

Maureen Naylor was first seen in March 1993 when she was employed by Curly Watts at Bettabuys supermarket, unaware that her first love Reg Holdsworth was the store manager. The pair had been engaged to be married when they were young, but Maureen's mother Maud disapproved of Reg and had ruined the relationship. Maureen went on to marry Frank Naylor but eventually divorced him after he treated her badly.

Delighted to be reunited, Maureen and Reg began courting, although Maureen's cautious behaviour led Reg to suspect she was seeing another man. Maureen eventually confessed that she was actually living with her mother and did not want her to frighten Reg away as she had done years before. Despite Maud's best efforts to sabotage their courtship with feigned illnesses and injuries, Reg and Maureen prepared to consummate their love in Reg's water bed, only for Derek Wilton to drill through the ceiling below into the bed, flooding the flat and humiliating Maureen. The couple got engaged again but Maureen called off the wedding when she caught Reg entertaining Debi Scott and accused him of being unfaithful. Devastated, Maureen got drunk and spent the night with Curly but was reconciled with Reg when he explained that he had been trying to secure a cheap deal for the Corner Shop from Debi.

Maureen and Reg married in January 1994 and ran the Corner Shop together. Reg, however, soon disliked his small environment and went to work for Firman's Freezers, leaving Maureen to run the business with Maud. Maureen was shocked when, during a visit to France, Maud admitted to her that she had been the result of an affair with an American soldier, Leonard Kennedy, and that her dead husband Wilfred Grimes was not her real father.

The Holdsworths attempted to sell the shop unsuccessfully, and the situation deteriorated when Reg took a job in Lowestoft, and Maureen became unhappy at having to drive long distances to see him only at weekends. In 1996, Maureen was left distraught when she discovered that Reg had been having an affair and had got his mistress in Lowestoft pregnant and agreed to divorce him. She threw herself into work at the shop and eventually embarked upon a romance with Bill Webster, of whom Maud approved. But another drunken night of passion with Curly left Bill unable to continue the relationship and Maureen was alone once again.

A while later, butcher Fred Elliott expressed an interest in Maureen and began to take her out. She enjoyed his company and being treated well but turned down his proposal of marriage, reluctant to wed for a third time. Maud disliked Fred, thinking him too loud and overbearing, like Reg. Maureen relented, however, and the couple married in September 1997. Less than a week into the union, Maureen decided that her mother had been right as she found Fred's constant attention and his plans for their future overbearing. Desperately unhappy, she found sympathy in Bill, who was planning to emigrate to Germany. He invited her to start a new life with him, and with Maud's blessing she left Weatherfield without telling Fred.

While in Germany, Maureen divorced Fred and married Bill and the couple did not return to Coronation Street for nine years until Bill visited his family in 2006 and began an affair with Audrey Roberts. On Christmas Day, Maureen surprised him by turning up at the Platts' house, where Audrey and the Websters were eating Christmas dinner. Audrey's grandson David Platt revealed Bill and Audrey's affair and Maureen was heartbroken and returned to Germany immediately. Bill followed her to beg forgiveness but returned to Weatherfield a few weeks later, claiming their marriage was over. Maureen still lives in Germany.

== John Finnan ==
John Finnan
- Coronation Street character
- Portrayed by: Shay Gorman
- Appears in: 22 March 1993
- Introduced by: Carolyn Reynolds
In-universe information
- Granddaughters: Carmel Finnan

John Finnan, portrayed by Shay Gorman, was Carmel Finnan's (Catherine Cusack) grandfather. He raised her as his own daughter, as his other daughter got pregnant with her at fifteen. Carmel became mentally unstable after discovering her true parentage fourteen years later, and she tried to accuse a much older man of getting her pregnant. Because of her behavior, John and his wife placed their granddaughter in a psychiatric hospital and a year later, Carmel left as a happy girl who put her dark past behind her.

Between 1992 and 1993, Carmel became obsessed with former college friend Martin Platt (Sean Wilson). This resulted in his then wife Gail (Helen Worth) to angrily confront Carmel at her bedsit, and the feud ended with Carmel falling down the stairs and breaking her leg. When Carmel falsely accused Gail of pushing her down the stairs, John arrived in Weatherfield to question the Platts about what happened and was shocked to discover that Carmel had falsely accused Martin of getting her pregnant; he explained her mental past and told them he would take her home to Ireland to get the care she needs.

== Amy Nelson ==
Amy Nelson
- Coronation Street character
- Portrayed by: Louise Duprey; Melanie Brown (uncredited)
- First appearance: 22 March 1993
- Last appearance: 20 October 1993
- Introduced by: Carolyn Reynolds
In-universe information
- Occupation: Shop assistant
- Mother: Kathleen Nelson
- Sons: Dominic Nelson

Amy Nelson, portrayed by Louise Duprey and Melanie Brown, was a shop assistant, who worked at Bettabuys. She worked mostly as a checkout operator, where she met Andy McDonald (Nicholas Cochrane) who was working at Bettabuys during his Easter break from Sheffield University. Amy is a few years older than Andy and has a five-year-old son named Dominic, who lived with his father, Errol in Trinidad. Andy and Amy end up building a relationship that became serious by the summer of 1993; however, Amy returned to Trinidad and reconciled with Errol.

Andy and Amy were intended to get married, being the first mixed-race wedding but Duprey opted out as she struggled with the pressures of fame being demanded and suffered a panic attack after recording her final episode, 1 October 1993. For the character's final appearance, future "Scary Spice" from the Spice Girls, Mel B (Melanie Brown) portrayed Amy on 20 October 1993, despite Brown being almost 20 years younger than Duprey. However, Brown was uncredited.

An interesting piece of trivia regarding the character is that actress Louise Duprey was born within a month of Beverley Callard (Liz McDonald), so the actresses playing Andy McDonald's mother and his fiancee, were exactly the same age.

== Maud Grimes ==
Maud Grimes
- Coronation Street character
- Portrayed by: Elizabeth Bradley
- Duration: 1993–1999
- First appearance: 2 April 1993
- Last appearance: 1 November 1999
- Introduced by: Carolyn Reynolds
In-universe information
- Occupation: Shop assistant
- Father: Malcolm Michaelson
- Mother: Beatrice Michaelson
- Husband: Wilfred Grimes
- Daughters: Maureen Webster; Peggy Phillips

Maud Grimes (also Michaelson) was played by Elizabeth Bradley for a period of six years from 1993 to 1999.

Maud is the elderly, wheelchair-using mother of Maureen Holdsworth (Sherrie Hewson). Maud was a bit of a battle-axe, being highly opinionated and bad-tempered. Maud worked in the Corner Shop with Maureen and later with her son-in-law Fred Elliott (John Savident) and his son Ashley Peacock (Steven Arnold). In August 1999 Maud announced to Fred, Ashley, Maxine and Audrey that she will marry Sidney Templeton. But he later dies when Audrey and Fred took him out before he could marry Maud. After six years in Coronation Street, she departed towards the end of 1999. No on-screen explanation was ever given for her departure. Actress Elizabeth Bradley died in October 2000. When Maureen returned in December 2006, she did not mention her mother.

== Tanya Pooley ==
Tanya Pooley
- Coronation Street character
- Portrayed by: Eva Pope
- Duration: 1993–1994
- First appearance: 31 May 1993
- Last appearance: 23 September 1994
- Introduced by: Carolyn Reynolds
In-universe information
- Occupation: Barmaid
- Father: Dennis Pooley

Tanya Pooley was played by Eva Pope. Tanya was first introduced as a barmaid at The Queens, a pub where Liz McDonald was manageress for a time. Tanya had a spiteful nature and often said hurtful things. Tanya later got a job as a barmaid at the Rovers and quickly became existing barmaid Raquel Wolstenhulme's enemy by setting her up with a fake modelling date which left Raquel standing alone in a deserted fruit and vegetable market for hours before realising it was a cruel joke.

Tanya later embarked on an affair with Des Barnes's boss, Alex Christie, a married man, but she was dissatisfied with the relationship. After moving into the flat above Alma's cafe, Tanya then conducted a three-month affair with Des whilst he was going out with Raquel. Once she had ruined their relationship, she set her sights on trucker Charlie Whelan, her boss Bet Lynch's boyfriend, and finally left the street with him, leaving Bet devastated. Bet had already sacked Tanya from her job at the Rovers Return for being spiteful to Raquel. However, a month later, Charlie returned to the street without Tanya, stating that she was only using him and their brief affair had ended.

In 2021, Laura-Jayne Tyler from Inside Soap called new character Daisy Midgeley (Charlotte Jordan) a "modern day" version of Tanya, who she described as "1993's version of a 'proper bi-atch'. Trust us – it's a compliment!"

== Colin Barnes ==
Colin Barnes
- Coronation Street character
- Portrayed by: Ian Embleton
- Duration: 1993, 1998–2000
- First appearance: 7 July 1993
- Last appearance: 10 April 2000
- Introduced by: Carolyn Reynolds (1993); David Hanson (1998); Jane MacNaught (2000)
In-universe information
- Father: Bob Barnes
- Mother: Pat Barnes
- Brothers: Des Barnes
- Wife: Kath Barnes (1998—)

Colin Barnes was the younger brother of Des Barnes, played on a recurring basis by actor Ian Embleton for a period of seven years between 1993 and 2000. Colin had affairs with pub landladies Liz McDonald and Natalie Barnes his former sister-in-law, and last appeared after the funeral of Natalie's son, Tony Horrocks, when he is questioned by the police on suspicion of his murder. Colin had blamed Tony for causing Des's death and had made a scene at the funeral. Colin told the police that he was with Natalie at the time Tony was killed in order to give himself an alibi.

A writer from ITVX put Colin on their list of Liz' top ten lovers, noting how Liz " took him to bed" after her 1993 split from her husband Jim McDonald (Charles Lawson).

== Charlie Whelan ==
Charlie Whelan
- Coronation Street character
- Portrayed by: John St. Ryan
- Duration: 1993–1994
- First appearance: 27 December 1993
- Last appearance: 14 October 1994
- Introduced by: Carolyn Reynolds
In-universe information
- Occupation: Lorry driver

Charlie Whelan was played by John St. Ryan from December 1993 to October 1994. Lorry driver Charlie makes himself a regular at the Rovers due to his romantic interest in landlady Bet Gilroy, recently divorced from her husband Alec. Bet was flattered by the attention, and Charlie won her over. They began dating and Bet fell deeply in love with him, but her heart was broken when barmaid Tanya Pooley was attracted to him. Tanya seduced Charlie and the attention of the younger woman led him to dump Bet and the pair ran off together. Charlie returned two weeks later and revealed that Tanya was using him and their brief affair was over. He pleaded with Bet to take him back, but she rejected him and Charlie left once again, this time for good.
