= Ken Morley =

English actor (born 1943)

- Born: Kenneth William Morley; 17 January 1943 (age 83); Chorley, Lancashire, England
- Occupations: Actor; comedian
- Years active: 1966–2015
- Notable work: Reg Holdsworth in Coronation Street; General Leopold von Flockenstuffen in 'Allo 'Allo!
- Television: 'Allo 'Allo! (1988–1991); Coronation Street (1989–1995); Hardware (2003–2004) Celebrity Masterchef (2014); Celebrity Big Brother (2015)
- Spouse: Susan Staples (m. 1989)
- Children: 1

Kenneth William Morley (born 17 January 1943) is an English actor and comedian, best known for playing Reg Holdsworth in the ITV soap opera Coronation Street from 1989 to 1995. He also played General Leopold von Flockenstuffen in the BBC sitcom 'Allo 'Allo! from 1988 to 1991.

== Early life ==
Kenneth William Morley was born on 17 January 1943 at Chorley Hospital in Chorley, Lancashire, the only child born to engineer father Frank Morley and his mother Phyllis Morley (née Owen). He was educated at St. Peter's Church of England School and Elementary School until the age of twelve and then he attended Ashworth College until he was fifteen. Morley left school with no qualifications. Morley trained as an apprentice mechanic and in September 1963 he enrolled at Alston Hall College where he gained six O-levels and two A-levels. In 1966, he moved to London to become a primary school teacher in Holloway Road, before moving back to Lancashire to become a supply teacher, mainly in History and English. Later in his teaching career, Ken was a teacher at Smithills High School in Bolton, Craigmount School in Edinburgh and Archbishop Tenison's School in London.

== Career ==
Morley made his acting debut in the 1966 film Alfie in an uncredited role, and subsequently the sequel Alfie Darling in 1975. He appeared in an episode of The Fall and Rise of Reginald Perrin as well as playing various characters in The Punch Review in 1977, later appearing in an episode of A Soft Touch in 1978, before making frequent appearances in British television series throughout the 1980s. His first major television role was playing General Leopold von Flockenstuffen in the BBC war sitcom 'Allo 'Allo! starring in the show from 1988 to 1991. In 1988, Morley appeared as a twitcher in the Christmas special on the TV comedy series Watching. In 1989, he joined the cast of the ITV soap opera Coronation Street, playing supermarket Bettabuys manager Reg Holdsworth. The character became a household name for his eccentric personality and spectacle glasses. Morley left the show in 1995, to pursue other acting roles and projects. In 1997, he appeared as a Librarian in the children's television show Woof! and guest starred as Nazi Captain Voorhese in the sitcom Red Dwarf. In 1998, he appeared in an episode of the television show The Grand as Harry Frindel. In 1999, Morley returned to Coronation Street in the spin-off show Coronation Street: After Hours alongside former Coronation Street actress Julie Goodyear. He has also appeared in Emmerdale spin-off show Emmerdale: Don't Look Now! - The Dingles in Venice playing Reg Holdsworth.

In 2003 to 2004, Morley starred in the sitcom Hardware as Rex alongside Martin Freeman. In 2005, he was a contestant in the ITV television show Celebrity Fit Club, where he lost over two stone (28 lb; 13 kg). Morley also appeared in adverts for Safestyle UK double glazing windows, featuring as a character similar to Reg Holdsworth.

Morley appeared in several pantomimes including Jack and the Beanstalk, Aladdin, Snow White, Sleeping Beauty In 2010, Morley returned to Coronation Street in the 50th Anniversary Special Coronation Street: A Knights Tale alongside former Coronation Street actor Kevin Kennedy who played Curly Watts. In 2011, he appeared in an episode of the children's television show Sooty as Hurbert Fanshawe. He also promoted and appeared in the adverts Coronation Street Bingo for Gala Bingo. In 2014, he guest-starred in the ITV sitcom Benidorm as Herbert, and was a contestant in the BBC cookery show Celebrity Masterchef.

In January 2015, Morley participated in the fifteenth series of the Channel 5 show Celebrity Big Brother. He entered the house on Day 1, 7 January, as a Housemate and Contestant. On 12 January he was removed from the Big Brother house for using "racist and sexist language". Ofcom had earlier received 233 complaints about his behaviour. His wife defended Morley, explaining: "I think possibly—how should I put it—he's been reading lots of Jacobean and Shakespearean drama. He will have watched Breaking Bad as well. I know my son's got it. He would have got it from there." Morley apologised "unreservedly" for his remarks and for anyone he "disappointed by saying what [he] said".

== Personal life ==
Morley married secondary school teacher Susan Staples on 27 July 1989 at Woolwich Town Hall. They had a son, born in 1991.

In 2002, Morley was the victim of a mugging by a group of youths who stole his trademark glasses, which were later recovered. In October 2007, Morley's wife was attacked during an armed raid on their house.

Morley had a fascination with cars from a young age and was an avid car collector. His collection included a 1956 Ford Fairlane, a 1959 pink Cadillac Coupe de Ville and two 1976 Cadillac Fleetwood Broughams.

== Filmography ==
Year	Title	Role	Notes
1966	Alfie	Man	Film role; uncredited
1975	Alfie Darling	Unknown	Film role
1977	The Punch Review	Various	Television series
1977	The Fall and Rise of Reginald Perrin	Arthur	Episode: "The Four Untrustworthy Men"
1978	A Soft Touch	Simon Staines	Episode: "Now Take my Wife"
1981	Funny Man	Tom	Episode: "The Good of the Cause"
1984	Smith & Jones	Nigel Simms	Episode: "Desert"
1986	All Passion Spent	Journalist	1 episode
1987	Bulman	PC Reid	Episode: "Chicken of the Baskervilles"
1987	Little Dorrit	Mr. Wobbler	Film role
1988	The Return of the Antelope	Removal man	Episode: "Home Again"
1988	The Management	Fat Charlie	Episode: "The Whelks"
1988	Chelmsford 123	Scipio	Episode: "What's Your Poison?"
1988	Les Girls	Middle-aged man	Television series
1988	Blind Justice	M.P on News	Episode: The One About the Irishman
1988–1991	'Allo 'Allo!	General Leopold von Flockenstuffen	Series regular
1988	Watching	Eric Ward	Episode: "Twitching"
1988	You Rang, M'Lord?	Mr. Challon	Episode: "Pilot"
1989–1995	Coronation Street	Reg Holdsworth	Series regular; 409 episodes
1990	KYTV	FA Director	Episode: "Big Fight Special"
1996	Zig and Zag's Dirty Deeds	Ken Morley	2 episodes
1997	Woof!	Librarian	Episode: "When My Sheep Comes In"
1997	Red Dwarf	Captain Vooherse	Episode: "Stoke Me a Clipper"
1998	The Grand	Harry Frindel	1 episode
1999	Coronation Street: After Hours	Reg Holdsworth	Coronation Street spin-off; 4 episodes
1999	Emmerdale: Don't Look Now! - The Dingle's in Venice	Reg Holdsworth	Emmerdale spin-off
2003–2004	Hardware	Rex	Series regular
2003	Margery & Gladys	Bill Nightingale	Television film
2005	Celebrity Fit Club	Himself	Participant
2010	Coronation Street: A Knights Tale	Reg Holdsworth	Coronation Street spin-off
2011	Sooty	Hubert Fanshawe	Episode: "Run Rabbit Run"
2014	Benidorm	Herbert	1 episode
2014	Celebrity MasterChef	Himself	Contestant
2015	Celebrity Big Brother	Himself	Contestant

=== Guest appearances ===
- Supermarket Sweep (1993) – 1 episode
- Celebrity Squares (1993) – 3 episodes
- Surprise Surprise (1994) – 1 episode
- Live Talk (2000) – 1 episode
- This Morning (2000) – 1 episode
- The Weakest Link (2003) – Soap Star Special – 1 episode
- This Morning (2003) – 1 episode
- Celebrities Under Pressure (2004) – 1 episode
- Today with Des and Mel (2004) – 1 episode
- Dick and Dom in da Bungalow (2004) – 1 episode
- Loose Women (2006) – 1 episode
- Richard & Judy (2009) – 1 episode
- Come Dine with Me (2010) – Coronation Street Special – 1 episode
- Loose Women (2010) – 2 episodes
- This Morning (2010) – 1 episode
- BBC Breakfast (2011) – 1 episode
- Pointless Celebrities (2012) – 1 episode
- Loose Women (2012) – 1 episode
- Celebrity Five Go To... (2012) – 4 episodes
- Piers Morgan's Life Stories (2013) – 1 episode
