= Natalie Barnes =

Fictional character from Coronation Street

- Coronation Street character
- Portrayed by: Denise Welch
- Duration: 1997–2000
- First appearance: Episode 4150; 26 February 1997
- Last appearance: Episode 4959; 31 December 2000
- Introduced by: Brian Park
In-universe information
- Occupation: Barmaid; Pub landlady
- Sisters: Debs Brownlow
- Husband: Nick Horrocks (until 1997); Des Barnes (1998)
- Sons: Tony Horrocks
- Daughters: Laura Horrocks
- Nieces: Lorraine Brownlow
- First cousins: Helen

Natalie Barnes (also Horrocks) is a fictional character from the British ITV soap opera Coronation Street, played by Denise Welch. She made her first appearance during the episode broadcast on 26 February 1997. She departed the series on 31 December 2000.

== Development ==
In 2000, it was reported that Denise Welch would leave the ITV soap opera at the end of the year as she was expecting a baby in March, but it is believed she had planned to leave the series anyway before learning of her pregnancy.

Welch said: "I am looking forward to being a mum again and spending some time with my baby and am relishing the prospect of new challenges in my career."

A Granada spokeswoman said the company had known of her decision "for some time. This has given us the opportunity to give a dramatic exit for the character of Natalie Barnes for the end of the year. We wish Denise well both for the birth of her baby and for her future career. Natalie's exit will come in December - the month which sees Coronation Street's 40th birthday. Viewers have seen her steal Kevin Webster, from his wife Sally, and her own husband Des Barnes was murdered a month after they married last year."

== Storylines ==
Natalie Horrocks came to Weatherfield in February 1997 to help out her son Tony (Lee Warburton), after he accidentally killed a woman named Joyce Smedley (Anita Carey) in his car and later suffered a mental breakdown over the tragedy. She soon takes over the running of Tony's share in the local garage, implementing a new billing system computer program before acting as part owner and manager in her son's absence. There she begins a relationship with Tony's business partner Kevin Webster (Michael Le Vell), despite the fact he is married and a lot younger than her. Natalie grows close to Kevin and convinces him that she only wants a romantic liaison with no strings attached. Kevin, who is lonely as his wife Sally (Sally Dynevor) is in Scarborough, decides to take a chance and starts a tryst with Natalie behind his wife's back.

After a period of time, Natalie decides that she wants Kevin full-time as she has fallen in love with him. She convinces him to leave Sally and move in with her, which he does. As a result of this, Natalie becomes the most hated woman on the street and Sally slaps her. Sally demands money for their daughters' upbringing, putting a strain on Kevin's relationship with Natalie as a result. By Christmas 1997, Kevin begins to miss his family. He leaves Natalie and returns to Sally and his children. Natalie is devastated at her loss. After finding herself unwanted at the garage, and feeling that it does not warrant her time, Natalie gets a job as The Rovers' new barmaid. The regulars are dismayed by this, and some refuse to drink there. With time, the regulars soften and Natalie becomes less offensive and people start to like her off-the-cuff manner.

Soon enough Natalie becomes friendly with local resident Des Barnes (Philip Middlemiss) while he is dating her colleague, fellow barmaid Samantha Failsworth (Tina Hobley). When their relationship ends, Natalie is there as a friend for Des. But then Samantha begins stalking Natalie and is jealous of her friendship with Des. When Samantha kidnaps Natalie's cat, the relationship between Des and Natalie grows. She struggles for months to fight her attraction to him, but eventually, they find themselves together. This is the relationship they had both longed for, and they consider each other a perfect match.

In early October 1998, Des proposes to Natalie and she accepts. Their wedding takes place not long afterwards and all the residents attend to celebrate their marriage. The marquee is decorated by Hayley Patterson (Julie Hesmondhalgh), the best man is Les Battersby (Bruce Jones) and the champagne flows. It is a union toasted by everybody, except the Websters, but the event nevertheless proves to be enjoyable.

The wedding looks to be all the more promising for Natalie when she reunites with Tony, who has seemingly returned to support his mother's wedding. However, what she doesn't know is that Tony has returned with serious problems. He is now a drug dealer and in big financial trouble. He needs money and Natalie is quick to give him what he needs, although she never knows what it is for; it is not enough. Des is the first to discover Tony's situation and eventually tells Natalie about it; she is shocked but still opts to help her son nevertheless. Unfortunately, tragedy strikes when Tony is accosted by three men who are looking for the money that he owes them. Des happens to be there as they attack Tony and attempts to rescue him, but the men end up injuring Des by tackling him onto a coffee table; Des is immediately rushed to hospital where he suffers a heart attack and dies in front of Natalie after professing his love for her. Natalie is devastated by Des' death and mourns for him at his funeral. She then disowns Tony, blaming him for her husband's death, and he leaves after Natalie declares she never wants to see him again.

In 1999, months after Des' death and Tony's departure, Natalie is looking for a new start and finds comfort with her job as a barmaid in The Rovers Return Inn public house. She soon finds out the pub is up for sale and ends up buying tenancy from landlord Alec Gilroy (Roy Barraclough) to take over the reins. After shifting Jack (Bill Tarmey) and Vera Duckworth (Liz Dawn) from their lodgings upstairs, Natalie moves into the pub and redecorates.

During her time as The Rovers new landlady, Natalie briefly dates punter Ian Bentley (Jonathan Guy Lewis) and is interested to learn he is due to get married; but what Natalie doesn't know is that Ian is engaged to Sharon Gaskell (Tracie Bennett), the former foster daughter of longtime resident Rita Sullivan (Barbara Knox). Soon enough Natalie's affair with Ian is discovered by staff member Betty Williams (Betty Driver), who then tells Rita before the pair confront Natalie over the affair. Natalie finishes with Ian but nevertheless clashes with Sharon after the later jilts him at the altar on their wedding day.

Months later, Natalie takes barmaid Leanne Tilsley (Jane Danson) under her wing when she moves in the pub after her marriage with Nick Tilsley (Adam Rickett) has collapsed. At first Natalie and Leanne get along, but then Leanne falls into debt with gangster Jez Quigley (Lee Boardman) over her cocaine addiction. He soon arranges for The Rovers to be robbed during the Millennium celebrations on New Year's Day 2000 and forces Leanne to help out with the plan. However, the Rovers robbery leaves Leanne hospitalised when she changes her mind and attempts to stop Jez; she later confesses to Natalie, who agrees to support her and seeks help for Leanne with a drug counsellor.

In early 2000, Natalie is devastated to discover that the body recently found in the new development of Victoria Street is that of her son Tony; the latter was found by Natalie's on-off lover, Vinny Sorrell (James Gaddas), after he falls through a hole. Vinny has worked with Natalie as barman in The Rovers but when they decide working together is bad for their relationship, he takes a job as a labourer. Natalie suffers a breakdown, confused over her feelings over Tony's death, as the last time she saw him they parted on bad terms after blaming her son for Des' death. Later on at Tony's funeral, Des's brother Colin (Ian Embleton) makes a scene and he later ends up getting questioned by the police about this. To avoid arrest, he tells the police that he was with Natalie on the night Tony died. Natalie is ashamed, especially as it damages her relationship with Vinny, but is nevertheless determined to find out who has murdered her son and even decides to put up a £10,000 award for information regarding Tony's death.

By then, Leanne's ordeal with Jez has gotten worse and soon their mutual acquaintance Steve McDonald (Simon Gregson) finds himself entangled in Jez's reign of terror. This continues when Jez plans to use Steve's minicab business to launder both money and drugs, even though Steve disagrees with the idea; Jez nevertheless coerces Steve into compliance by threatening him with the same fate as Tony had suffered. Steve later tells Natalie about the threat Jez has given him and the pair realize that Jez is the one who killed Tony. In response to this, Natalie goes to the police with this information and Jez is arrested but is found not guilty when Steve's motives as a witness are questioned; Jez later gets his comeuppance, however, when he dies in hospital after being beaten up by Steve's father Jim (Charles Lawson) in retaliation for having his son attacked at an underground car park.

From then onwards, Natalie starts rebuilding her life. Eventually she finds herself pregnant with Vinny's baby, only to end up facing another blow when she discovers that Vinny is dating her sister Debs Brownlow (Gabrielle Glaister) at the same time; Debs had recently moved to Weatherfield after working as a hairdresser on cruise ships. Natalie feels she cannot forgive them for this, and rejects both of them before evicting Debs from the property. They leave Weatherfield together, going to Southampton, with Vinny hoping to get a job with Debs on a cruise ship, unaware that Natalie is pregnant. Natalie wants to keep the baby but decides that she does not want to bring her child up in a pub and in urban Weatherfield. During Christmas 2000, after inviting Kevin for Christmas dinner, she is accosted by Sally in The Rovers. Sally assumes that she is trying to seduce Kevin again, but Natalie retorts by telling her that she has some nerve to accuse her of attempting to seduce Kevin after she slept with Kevin the night before he married Alison Wakefield (Naomi Radcliffe) and Sally leaves the pub, humiliated. Natalie sells The Rovers, intending to start a new life in the Cotswolds, but there are protests from the residents when Natalie decides to sell to the Boozy Chain, who intend to call the place The Boozy Newt. After some negotiation, businessmen Duggie Ferguson (John Bowe), Fred Elliott (John Savident) and Mike Baldwin (Johnny Briggs) agree to buy the pub and save it from its fate with the Boozy Chain. Natalie leaves Weatherfield for Consett on New Year's Eve 2000.

Barmaid Geena Gregory (Jennifer James) announces in The Rovers that Natalie has given birth to a baby girl named Laura. It is uncertain if Natalie still has shares in Kevin's garage. Natalie is mentioned again in November 2009 when Kevin starts an affair with Molly Dobbs (Vicky Binns). Molly's husband Tyrone (Alan Halsall) tells Molly about Kevin's past affairs, saying that Natalie was the biggest of them all, but he and Sally would always end up back together.

== Reception ==
Kerry Barrett from Emmerdale Insider called Natalie an "icon" of the soap and believed that her affair with Kevin was "steamy"; she also opined that Natalie "became the latest in a long line of legendary Rovers landladies".
