= Raquel Watts =

Fictional character from Coronation Street

- Coronation Street character
- Portrayed by: Sarah Lancashire
- Duration: 1991–1996, 2000
- First appearance: Episode 3178; 23 January 1991
- Last appearance: Episode 4745; 2 January 2000
- Introduced by: Mervyn Watson (1991); Jane MacNaught (2000)
- Spin-off appearances: Coronation Street: The Cruise (1995)
In-universe information
- Occupation: Barmaid
- Father: Larry Wolstenhulme
- Mother: Eileen Wolstenhulme
- Sisters: Bernice Wolstenhulme
- Husband: Curly Watts (1995–2000); Armand de Beaux (2000–present)
- Sons: Unnamed son
- Daughters: Alice Watts
- Uncles: Arthur
- Aunts: Jean; Sylvia Wolstenhulme

Raquel Watts (also Wolstenhulme) is a fictional character from the British ITV soap opera Coronation Street, played by Sarah Lancashire from 23 January 1991 until 15 November 1996. Lancashire returned on 2 January 2000 for one episode.

== Creation and characterisation ==
Raquel was created by Coronation Street writer John Stevenson. His starting point was Bettabuys supermarket—a Northern "everyman" chain—and a conceptualisation of characters that might populate it. A Miss Bettabuy competition was suggested as a humorous storyline, with comedy derived from the contradiction between a beauty contest and the "prosaic and mundane" setting of Bettabuys. From this, the name Raquel Wolstenhulme was devised, contrasting the glamorous Hollywood connotations of 'Raquel' with the down-to-earth Northern surname 'Wolstenhulme'. This glamorous/mundane contradiction was then encapsulated in the character.

Raquel filled the dizzy blonde and tart with a heart stereotypes in Coronation Street. Her defining characteristics included her "short skirts, big hair and ... even bigger heart." Alongside her bouffant hair and short skirts, Raquel's costume commonly included high-heels and a great deal of make-up, reflecting her glamour model aspirations. The Guardian's Nancy Banks-Smith described her as having an "almost saintly idiocy", and Dominic Maxwell of The Times wrote that her "comic brio and emotional tenderness" made her a standout character. Ben Thompson of The Independent deemed her most affecting qualities to be her "hauteur, kindness and dignity in the face of defeat." AOL's Anne Richardson called Raquel "the very definition of loveable", writing: "Always trying to better herself, but without any social climbing snobbery, she longed for a better life whilst always seeming to be resigned to the fact that she'd never actually get there. Sweetly naive and tragically vulnerable, we longed for her to find her happy ending and our hearts broke every time hers did."

Lancashire initially had reservations about Raquel's characterisation, and believes that the writers were uncertain how to use her in early episodes. She found her two-dimensional, with an unappealing "acidic side" which could have resulted in Raquel becoming the "street bitch" had it been embellished. She took it upon herself to highlight Raquel's potential, playing against what had been written to make her more comic, evoking the sympathy of the audience. Thereafter, Raquel was often used for comedic purposes, though Lancashire attempted to keep her from becoming simply a figure of fun. During one storyline, she was taught French by Weatherfield teacher Ken Barlow (William Roache), leading to what Richardson named one of the series' best comedy scenes:

Raquel: "I met a French man in Corfu who taught me how to say, 'Isn't it a lovely day today?'"

Ken: "Right, let's put a sentence together. I want you to say to me, in French, 'Hello, Ken. My name is Raquel. Isn't it a lovely day today?'"

Raquel: "Ooh, clever. Right, here goes. 'Bonjour, Ken. Je m'appelle Raquel. Voulez-vous coucher avec moi ce soir ? '"

The Independent's Deborah Ross feels that Lancashire bought "vulnerability and heartache and real tragedy and painful gullibility" to Raquel, citing the French lesson with Ken and the pride in Raquel's response as an example of her amusing but sad brilliance.

In her book Soap Opera, Dorothy Hobson suggests that Raquel epitomised the representation of Northern working-class women during the 1990s: "Raquel articulated the hopes of many young women in her position. The character was complex; one that the whole audience loved, she was naive, gentle, and although she looked as if she would break men's hearts, for the most part it was her own heart that was broken." Hobson deemed Raquel's breakdown at the registry office prior to her marriage to Curly "one of the most poignant and heartbreaking of any scene in a soap opera, or indeed in any other dramas." She felt that in sobbing with awareness that she was marrying not for love but security, Raquel "spoke of the young working-class women, bright, intelligent, who had been failed by the education system, thus united the shared cultural knowledge of the audience as she wept for herself and millions of other women like her."

== Casting and development ==
Lancashire is the daughter of Geoffrey Lancashire, a scriptwriter who worked on 171 episodes of Coronation Street during the 1960s. She made her first Coronation Street appearance in 1987, shortly after graduating from drama school. Lancashire had a walk-on role as Wendy Farmer, a nurse who enquired about lodging with established character Jack Duckworth (William Tarmey). The actress then spent a year performing in West End theatre, and worked as a drama lecturer in Salford before being cast as Raquel in 1991, initially on a three-month contract. She continued to teach for a year, before committing to Coronation Street full-time. Thompson believes that it was Raquel's role in the 1994 Tanya and Des love triangle storyline which "elevated [her] to the pantheon of Street legend." Lancashire recalls it as a well-constructed storyline with credible pacing, explaining that "because Raquel lives in this very idealistic world – she's such a dreamer – when reality hits her, it hits very, very hard. That really was the first opportunity we'd had to strip away a bit of the exterior of her character and see how fragile she was."

Lancashire remained in the series until 1996, and was paid £90,000 annually. Two years into the role, she experienced a 14-month nervous breakdown, but did not confide in anyone beside her close family, or take any time off work, which in retrospect she deemed "the worst thing [she] could have done." Lancashire departed in 1996 due to her heavy work schedule and desire to pursue other projects. She had grown tired of the fame the role brought her, shying away from personal appearances and interviews with television magazines, which made her feel "like an airhead". Although at the beginning of her tenure she agreed to some interviews, she later refused all publicity for Coronation Street, threatening to leave if she was made to do it.

Her departure was spread over three episodes, including an hour-long special. Her final scenes attracted 20 million viewers. Lancashire briefly reprised the role in 2000, with series producer Jane Macnaught deeming Raquel one of Coronation Street's most popular ever characters and her return an opportunity for her "millions of fans" to learn what had happened to her in the intervening years. Lancashire and Kennedy were the only cast members to appear in Raquel's return episode, marking the first time the programme had featured just two characters. It remained the only two-hander episode of the soap for seven years, until a 2007 episode featured only mother and daughter Deirdre (Anne Kirkbride) and Tracy Barlow (Kate Ford).

== Storylines ==
Raquel is established as the daughter of a strict Catholic father and heavy-drinking mother, estranged from her father after partaking in semi-nude modelling. She is introduced as an assistant at Weatherfield's Bettabuy supermarket, working alongside Curly Watts (Kevin Kennedy), with whom she begins a relationship. They separate when Raquel develops feelings for a photographer and moves to London to become a model. Disappointed by the calibre of work she is offered, Raquel returns to Weatherfield and becomes a barmaid at the Rovers Return Inn. She moves in with local bookmaker Des Barnes (Philip Middlemiss) and they develop a relationship, but he evicts her when his estranged wife Steph (Amelia Bullmore) returns. Landlady Bet Gilroy (Julie Goodyear) allows Raquel to move into the Rovers. She dates Weatherfield County FC striker Wayne Farrell (Ray Polhill), but breaks up with him and pushes him into a canal when she discovers that he is cheating on her. Des and Raquel repair their relationship and move back in together but break up again when Des has an affair with Raquel's workmate, Tanya Pooley (Eva Pope).

Raquel renews her friendship with Curly, who falls in love with her and proposes. Although Raquel accepts, she tells Des that she loves him, not Curly and decides to break off the engagement. The following year, Curly's boss Leo Firman (John Elmes) attempts to rape Raquel. She manages to escape and tells Curly, who attacks Leo. Raquel gives evidence of sexual harassment against him and Leo is fired. She and Curly grow closer in the aftermath. Though Raquel sleeps with Des again, he makes it clear that it was just a one-night stand, and Raquel accepts that she will never mean as much to Des as he does to her. Later that day, Raquel proposes to Curly. They have a quick register office wedding, and it is not until their honeymoon that Raquel admits what happened with Des. Curly forgives her, and their married life is initially happy. It does not last, however, and within a year Raquel leaves Curly to accept an aromatherapy job in Kuala Lumpur.

Four years later, Raquel visits Curly seeking a divorce. She reveals that she was pregnant when she left and they have a daughter, Alice Diana Watts. She tells Curly that she could not stay in Kuala Lumpur once her pregnancy was revealed and got a new job as a housekeeper in France following Alice's birth, where she fell in love with her employer, by whom she is now pregnant and wishes to marry. Curly agrees to a divorce, giving Raquel's new relationship his blessing. Two years later, Bet mentions that she keeps in touch with Raquel who is still happily married and now also has a son.

== Reception ==
Raquel was well received by critics, deemed by Banks-Smith to be "the jewel in the Rovers' crown". She called Lancashire "one of the bright particular stars of Coronation Street", writing that Raquel, "as is the strange way of stars, shines bright long after the star itself has gone." Reviewing the two-hander episode between Raquel and Curly, Banks-Smith called it "profoundly melancholic", describing Raquel as, "the barmaid every man dreamed would serve him, leaning like the blessed damozel from the gold bar of heaven, backed by shining spirits in bottles. A barmaid in excelsis. Beautiful as a daffodil though not as bright. A fine comic creation but entirely without a sense of humour." Ross, a long-standing fan of Coronation Street, classes Raquel as one of the programme's greatest characters, alongside Elsie Tanner (Pat Phoenix) and Hilda Ogden (Jean Alexander), all "as brilliantly watchable as anything you might see at the National".

In a 2010 feature examining Coronation Street's matriarchs, Daily Mirror columnist Tony Stewart named Raquel his favourite, deeming her one of the programme's funniest characters. Considering the ten best soap opera Christmas moments, Guardian writer Daniel Martin included the 1994 Coronation Street episode in which Curly names a star after Raquel, praising it as an example of the producers not taking the "easy option" of a Christmas Day wedding. The Sunday Tribune's Diarmuid Doyle lauded the way Raquel overcame the blonde stereotype, "balancing her ditziness with real warmth and likeability and becoming one of the show's best-loved characters in the 1990s." Raquel had a celebrity fan in Cliff Richard, who admitted in the 2000 documentary 40 Years on Coronation Street that he once dreamed of being cast in a walk-on role, rescuing Raquel from Curly and marrying her himself. In 2010, The Guardian listed Raquel as one of the 10 best Coronation Street characters of all time.

Raquel has become a notable facet of Lancashire's career. In 2001, The Guardian's Gareth McLean stated that while she has avoided being typecast, Raquel "may be the role for which she is best known". Fellow Guardian writer Paul Flynn observed in 2004 that Lancashire is "assured her place in the national psyche" because of Raquel, and when Lancashire starred in the 2009 BBC drama All the Small Things, The Guardian's Lucy Mangan noted that she is "still for many of us trailing clouds of the glorious Raquel Wolstenhulme". In 2011, Raquel's wedding to Curly was placed eighteenth in Channel 5's "Greatest TV Weddings" programme. Producer Spencer Campbell thought the wedding was saddening, whilst critic Tina Baker felt she and everyone watching knew it was doomed for the pair. Ian Hyland opined that Raquel, Curly and Des' storyline was a "classic television love triangle".

In 1998, writers from Inside Soap published an article about the top ten characters they wanted to return to soap. Raquel was featured and they described her as "the dizzy blonde barmaid and would-be model who married Curly Watts when she was on the rebound from Des Barnes."

== In other media ==
Raquel and Curly are the central characters of Coronation Street – The Cruise, a 75 minute special following their honeymoon, which was released on VHS by Granada in December 1995. The special was advertised as being exclusive to video, and 750,000 copies were sold, to the value of £10 million. The Independent Television Commission received 70 complaints and investigated when Granada then broadcast the special on television on 24 March 1996. It received 16 million viewers, and prompted hundreds of complaints to Granada. A spokesman stated that Granada had always intended to broadcast the special "once a suitable period had elapsed" following its release.
