= Elizabeth Bradley =

English actress (1922–2000)

- Born: Joan Abraham; 20 May 1922; Macclesfield, Cheshire, England
- Died: 30 October 2000 (aged 78); Princess Grace Hospital Centre, Monte Carlo, Monaco
- Occupation: Actress
- Years active: 1940s–2000
- Known for: Coronation Street (1978, 1993–1999)
- Spouse: Garth Adams (m. 1950; died 1977)
- Children: 3

Elizabeth Bradley (20 May 1922 – 30 October 2000) was an English actress. She played Maud Grimes in the British soap opera Coronation Street.

== Early life ==
Bradley was born Joan Abraham in Macclesfield, Cheshire, the daughter of a senior civil servant, and took her father's middle name as her stage surname. She started acting professionally at the age of 23.

Bradley's played wheelchair-using pensioner Maud Grimes in Coronation Street from 1993 to 1999. The character was described as a battle-axe and was once called "the mother-in-law from hell". She filmed 476 episodes during this time. Bradley had previously played character Councillor Adams in the soap in 1978, but was credited then as Margaret Bradley.

She has also made TV appearances in London's Burning, The Bill, Casualty, Bad Girls and The Sweeney. Her film roles included Four Dimensions of Greta and The Flesh and Blood Show (both 1972) with director Pete Walker, and as the old woman who encounters a naked David Naughton at London Zoo in An American Werewolf in London (1981).

She was also a successful theatre actress, obtaining an Olivier Award nomination as Best Supporting Actress for her role in a National Theatre production of Billy Liar.

== Personal life and death ==
Bradley married actor Garth Adams in 1950, and remained with him until his death in 1977; they had three children. She died after suffering a stroke, at the age of 78.

== Filmography ==
Year	Title	Role	Notes
1957	Huntingtower		Series 1 Episode 3
1960	The Long Way Home		Episode: "French Resistance"
1960–1962	Bonehead	Second Mother / Mrs. Golightly	3 episodes
1963	Julius Caesar	Plebeian	Series 1 Episode 3
1963–1973	Z-Cars	Various characters	5 episodes
1964	Emergency Ward 10	Mrs Tardy	Episode #1.708
1966	Davy Jones' Locker	Mrs Haddock	
1968	Dr. Finlay's Casebook	Mrs Gordon	Episode: "The Equilibrium"
1969	The First Lady	Alice Cobden	Episode: "To Hell with Purity"
1969	Take Three Girls	Mrs Bell	Episode: "Stop Acting"
1970	Daniel Deronda	Mrs Gascoigne	2 episodes
1971	Television Club	Mrs Smithers	2 episodes
1972	Dixon of Dock Green	Mrs Wheeler	Episode: "Night Beat"
1972	Four Dimensions of Greta	" Mrs Schickler	
1972	The Flesh and Blood Show	Mrs Saunders	
1973	Softly Softly: Task Force	Mrs Thompson	Episode: "No Life for a Woman"
1974	The Nine Tailors	Mrs Venables	3 episodes
1975	In This House of Brede	Dame Margaret	
1976	No Hard Feelings	Mrs Etheridge	
1977	Van der Valk	Hannah	Episode: "Wolf"
1978	A Traveller in Time	Aunt Tissey / Dame Cicely	5 episodes
1978	The Devil's Crown	Old Nun	
1978	The Sweeney	Mrs Hibberd	Episode: "Latin Lady"
1978	Coronation Street	Councillor Adams	Credited as Margaret Bradley
1979	Blue Peter Special Assignment	Elizabeth Gaskell	Episode: "The Bronte's at Haworth"
1979	Play for Today	Nelly	Episode: "Waterloo Sunset"
1980	Escape	Madame Chauvet	Episode: "The Cartland Murder"
1980	Play for Today		Episode: "Pasmore"
1981	An American Werewolf in London	Woman in Zoo	
1981	Play for Today	Mum	Episode: "London is Drowning"
1982	Brimstone and Treacle	Woman Passer by	
1982	God Speed Co-operation	Mrs Burrows	Television film documentary
1983	The Citadel	Mrs Vidler	
1983	Tales of the Unexpected	Mrs Bradley	Episode: "A Sad Loss"
1984–1985	Leaving	Mrs Ford	8 episodes
1985	Shine On Harvey Moon	Lady in Gallery	Episode: "Mud Sticks"
1985	Juliet Bravo	Mrs Grinley	
1985	Christmas Present	Granny Harris	
1986–1993	The Bill	Various characters	4 episodes
1987	The Mistress	Mourner	Series 2 Episode 1
1989	Bergerac	Mrs Maurice	Episode: "Second Time Around"
1989	Screenplay	Nellie	Episode: "A Small Mourning"
1990	The Piglet Files	Mrs Russell	Episode: "A Room with a View"
1990	Casualty	Edith Clarke	Episode: "Street Life"
1991	Boon	Gladys Swann	Episode: "Bad Pennies"
1992	Resnick: Lonely Hearts	Vera Barnett	3 episodes
1992	Screen Two: Memento Mori	Mrs Anthony	
1992	An Ungentlemanly Act	Nanny	Television film
1992	London's Burning	Stout woman	Series 5 Episode 7
1992	Screenplay	Great Aunt Annie	Episode: "A Little Bit of Lippy"
1993	Rides	Mari	
1993–1999	Coronation Street	Maud Grimes	
1994	Casualty	Mrs Daniels	Episode: "Value for Money"
1994	A Skirt Through History	Emilie Peacocke	Episode: "A Lady's Portion"
2000	Bad Girls	Mrs Foster	Episode: "Facing Up"
