= Shirley Armitage =

Fictional character from Coronation Street

- Coronation Street character
- Portrayed by: Lisa Lewis
- Duration: 1983–1989
- First appearance: Episode 2340; 5 September 1983
- Last appearance: Episode 2926; 12 April 1989
- Introduced by: Bill Podmore
In-universe information
- Occupation: Machinist
- Father: Walter Armitage
- Mother: Velma Armitage
- Brothers: Franklin Frazer Armitage; Marvin Armitage; Gregory Armitage
- Sisters: Laverne Armitage; Patsy Armitage; Lucy Armitage
- First cousins: Carol; Donna; Diana

Shirley Armitage is a fictional character from the British ITV soap opera Coronation Street. Played by Lisa Lewis, the character appeared for a period of five years between 1983 and 1989. Shirley became the programme's first regular black character. Shirley Armitage was a machinist at Baldwin's Casuals. From 1988 to 1989, she lived with Curly Watts (Kevin Kennedy) in the shop flat but left the area when they split up. The character was met with a mixed reception from viewers due to her mixed-race relationship with Curly.

== Development ==
Shirley was Coronation Street's first regular black character; a black family would not be introduced on the soap until 2019, with the arrival of the Bailey family. After 18 months in the role, Lewis expressed her displeasure at the way she was used, explaining "They seem to just bring me in whenever they want me to say a few lines, or be seen in the factory. Let's face it, I am the token black character." Three years later, Lewis said she was proud to be on the show, as it had helped her have both a family and a job as an actress. Lewis also said that "[Shirley's] such a nice, versatile character" and was not afraid of being typecast due to this. She also understood that Shirley was "unlikely to develop into a bigger part".

In March 1988, Ken Irwin of the Daily Mirror reported that a new romance would be developed between Shirley and Curly Watts (Kevin Kennedy) after they begin sharing a flat. Both Lewis and Kennedy expected some criticism of the relationship, but Irwin stated that scriptwriters were "quite determined" to build up the romance. The storyline begins with Shirley and Curly competing for the flat above the corner shop, before "they compromise and shock a few people" by agreeing to share it. Their friendship then develops into "a torrid affair". The couple's relationship is gossiped about in the local pub, as the regulars note that Curly "has never been a ladies' man", while he admits that the romance is his first. Lewis was "delighted" at the way the writers had developed the romance between the couple and revealed that she and Kennedy had received letters congratulating them on it. She also enjoyed working with Kennedy on the storyline, as they had always been friends. John Millar of the Daily Record believed that the relationship could establish Lewis as one of the serial's "new breed of soap stars", following years on the fringes as a factory girl. With the introduction of the show's new "brat pack", featuring young actors, Shirley also becomes more involved in storylines.

A scene in which Shirley wears a negligee and seduces Curly was branded "tender and comic" by Neil Clements of the Daily Express, but Lewis did not want to read her fan mail after it aired. Lewis told Clements: "She is black and he is white and I knew that certain people would never see them as two people who loved each other – they would only see it as black and white in bed." Lewis's co-star Bill Tarmey, who played Jack Duckworth, volunteered to read the letters, something he had previously done when she became upset by other fan mail, but to Lewis's surprise the letters "turned out to be lovely." Lewis recalled that it was hard for her to keep a straight face as they filmed the bedroom scene, as she was wearing the negligee and Kennedy was in pyjamas buttoned up to the collar. She said it was funny, but it went "beautifully well" as they managed to get some tenderness into it, which she hoped would make viewers feel for both characters. Lewis also told Clements that the issues raised by Curly and Shirley's relationship were not just invented by scriptwriters. She would often speak up if she thought a scene or plot was "going the wrong way". She used the example of Curly's parents ignoring her character where she stepped in and explained what she would have done in a similar situation.

== Storylines ==
Shirley Armitage starts work at denim factory Baldwin's Casuals in September 1983. Shirley comes from a big family, with nine living in the same house. At the factory, Shirley is one of the youngest machinists and usually stays quiet while the louder personalities, chiefly Vera Duckworth (Liz Dawn) and Ida Clough (Helene Palmer), lead the gossip. She occasionally speaks up to back the girls against Mike Baldwin (Johnny Briggs), for example when she favours a strike when Mike announces that some jobs would be at risk because of a new computer system at the factory in July 1984.

In 1985, Shirley chats to Curly Watts (Kevin Kennedy) at a dance at the Community Centre and lets him walk her home afterwards. Curly is shy about asking her out, but they hit it off and Curly later chats her up at Kevin (Michael Le Vell) and Sally Webster's (Sally Dynevor) flat warming party in August 1987. They start seeing each other on a casual basis after that. By 1986, Shirley is getting sick of living in such a crowded home and decides to ask Alf Roberts (Bryan Mosley) if she could rent the shop flat as the Websters have moved into No.13. Alf asks for a reference, but in the time it takes her to get one from Emily Bishop (Eileen Derbyshire), Curly also makes enquiries about the flat and Alf agrees that he can move in. When Shirley and Curly compare notes, they are puzzled as Curly has not been asked for a reference. Thinking Alf racist, Curly decides to refuse to move in, but Shirley suggests they move in together. Curly agrees and Alf backs down when Emily threatens to expose his racism. The unexpected move marks a big change in Shirley's and Curly's lives, as well as their relationship, with Curly losing his virginity to Shirley. Their next obstacle is winning over each other's families; as well as the race issue, Shirley's parents disapprove of her living in sin. Eventually, Mrs Armitage is convinced that Curly loves Shirley, but his parents never accept her. Mrs Armitage is accepting enough to let Shirley's younger sister, Lucy, stay with the couple for a few weeks in August.

Later that year, Curly enrolls in a business studies course at college. Shirley is not convinced it would be a good move as that would make her the sole earner while he studies but she admires his ability, and causes a stir at work by showing them Curly's essay on Mike making the machinists work in terrible Victorian conditions. Mike threatens to sack Shirley unless Curly gives him the essay. Curly's new career is to split the couple up. In April 1989, Shirley throws a surprise party to celebrate their first anniversary but Curly promptly throws everyone out as he has an important exam the next day. Shirley realises that Curly is too serious for her and decides to move back in with her parents. Desperate to stop Shirley leaving, Curly breaks down and proposes marriage, promising to change, but Shirley knows that the relationship has run its course and leaves. Shirley leaves Baldwin's Casuals a week after splitting up with Curly and moves to Gorton.

== Reception ==
Before becoming more prominent in 1988, viewers accused Shirley of being a "token" character for being a black woman who was not given as many storylines as other characters. Shirley's relationship with Curly was the second mixed race couple in Coronation Street's history. Because of this, both Lewis and Kennedy received hate mail. On this backlash, the soap's executive producer, Bill Podmore, stated: "Several viewers were disgusted that I could have sanctioned such a relationship; none of them had the courage to sign their letters, which speaks volumes."

Marianna Manson from Closer Online put Shirley on her list of the most iconic black characters in British soap operas, writing, "Shirley is, of course, best known as the first Black character on a British soap. Introduced as recently as 1983, her arrival on the Street was groundbreaking but proved the TV industry at the time had a long way to go (and still does). For most of Shirley's time in Weatherfield she was in a relationship with Curly Watts, but broke his heart in 1989 before leaving the Street for good".

Juliet Robeson from The Weekly Journal wrote that the character was "quietly in the background before she came out of herself and into her own strong, interesting character". Robeson also praised that Shirley "was neither politically aggressively 'black' not cautiously 'positive' white" and deemed Shirley "totally believable" and a "success". John Millar of the Daily Record reckoned Lewis "brought a dash of spice to Coronation Street... and made a man of Curly Watts." Of Shirley and Curly's romance, Neil Clements of the Daily Express quipped "that quirky love affair has woken up the more jaded Street fans who thought Hilda Ogden switched the lights off when she left."
