= Leaving (TV series) =

Television series

- Genre: Sitcom
- Written by: Carla Lane
- Directed by: John B. Hobbs
- Starring: Keith Barron; Susan Hampshire
- Country of origin: United Kingdom
- Original language: English
- No. of series: 2
- No. of episodes: 12

Production
- Producer: John B. Hobbs
- Running time: 30 minutes
- Production company: BBC

Original release
- Network: BBC 2
- Release: 20 June 1984 – 13 June 1985

Leaving is a British television sitcom which aired on BBC Two in two series from 1984 to 1985.

== Main cast ==
- Keith Barron as Daniel Ford
- Susan Hampshire as Martha Ford
- Gary Cady as Matthew Ford
- Caroline Dennis as Josephine
- Lucy Aston as Gina Ford
- Elizabeth Bradley as Mrs. Ford
- Richard Vernon as Mr. Chessington
- Philip Latham as Mr. Raphael
- Norma Streader as Freda
- Myrtle Devenish as Mrs. Barry
- Rachel Davies as Jan
- John Arthur as Ray Huntingdon
- Christine Shaw as Delia

== Bibliography ==
- Horace Newcomb. Encyclopedia of Television. Routledge, 2014.
