= David Beckett =

English cricketer (born 1954)

Personal information
- Full name: David Beckett
- Born: 25 October 1954 (age 72); Oxford, Oxfordshire, England
- Batting: Left-handed
- Bowling: Left-arm medium

Domestic team information
- Years: Team
- 1976–1980: Oxfordshire
- 1986: Devon

Career statistics
Competition	List A
Matches	1
Runs scored	0
Batting average	–
100s/50s	–/–
Top score	–
Balls bowled	60
Wickets	0
Bowling average	–
5 wickets in innings	–
10 wickets in match	–
Best bowling	–
Catches/stumpings	–/–
- Source: Cricinfo, 22 June 2019

David Beckett (born 25 October 1954) is a former English cricketer.

Beckett was born in Oxford, and debuted for Oxfordshire in minor counties cricket in the 1976 Minor Counties Championship against Buckinghamshire. He played minor counties cricket for Oxfordshire until 1980, having made eighteen appearances in the Minor Counties Championship. During his time at Oxfordshire, Beckett also made a single appearance in List A one-day cricket against the first-class county Warwickshire in the 1980 Gillette Cup at Edgbaston. He later made two appearances in the Minor Counties Championship for Devon in 1986.
