= Curly Watts =

Fictional character from Coronation Street

- Coronation Street character
- Portrayed by: Kevin Kennedy
- Duration: 1983–2003
- First appearance: Episode 2324; 11 July 1983
- Last appearance: Episode 5573; 1 September 2003
- Introduced by: Mervyn Watson
- Book appearances: Coronation Street: The Complete Saga
- Spin-off appearances: Coronation Street: The Cruise (1995); University Challenge Challenges Coronation Street (1997); Coronation Street: A Knights Tale (2010)
In-universe information
- Occupation: Supermarket deputy manager Binman
- Father: Arthur Watts
- Mother: Eunice Watts
- Wife: Raquel Wolstenhulme (1995–2000); Emma Taylor (2000–2003)
- Sons: Ben Watts
- Daughters: Alice Watts

Norman "Curly" Watts is a fictional character from the British ITV soap opera Coronation Street, from 1983 to 2003, and in spin-off DVD Coronation Street: A Knights Tale in 2010. He was portrayed throughout by Kevin Kennedy. Most of Curly's storylines dealt with his repeated failure to form a successful romantic relationship. His nickname resulted from him having straight, lank hair and getting into rows over money, mainly in 1996. His hobby was astronomy and he installed a telescope in the loft of his house. Kennedy left the soap in 2003 after 20 years.

== Casting ==
Since his departure, Kevin Kennedy has expressed interest in reprising his role as Curly. However, ITV has announced that there are no plans for Curly to return.

== Storylines ==
The character was originally a paperboy for Rita Fairclough (Barbara Knox), before working as a binman with Chalky Whiteley (Teddy Turner) and Eddie Yeats (Geoffrey Hughes), whilst lodging with Emily Bishop (Eileen Derbyshire), and later Jack (William Tarmey) and Vera Duckworth (Elizabeth Dawn). He later worked for Mike Baldwin (Johnny Briggs) alongside his best friend Terry Duckworth (Nigel Pivaro). Curly's first serious romance was with Shirley Armitage (Lisa Lewis), a black sewing-machinist from Baldwin's factory. Opposition from his old-fashioned parents Arthur (Kenneth Waller) and Eunice (Angela Rooks & Georgine Anderson) led to tension between the couple, and Shirley left when Curly threw out the guests at his surprise party so he could revise for upcoming HND exams in Business Studies.

Having obtained his HND, Curly became an assistant manager at Bettabuy supermarket, where he became a protégé of manager Reg Holdsworth (Ken Morley). Whilst working there, he had a relationship with employee Kimberley Taylor (Suzanne Hall). Once again, opposition – this time from both sets of parents – caused problems. Despite other brief flings with girls such as Anne Malone (Eve Steele), Angie Freeman (Deborah McAndrew), a much older woman in Reg's future wife Maureen Holdsworth (Sherrie Hewson) – who tried to get him sacked when he rejected her advances – and a much younger woman in Maxine Peacock (Tracy Shaw), Curly seemed doomed never to find domestic happiness.

After a prolonged on-off relationship, Curly married Raquel Wolstenhulme (Sarah Lancashire), who left him less than a year later to work as a beautician in Kuala Lumpur, and later moved to France with their daughter, Alice Diana. Curly did not know about the child until Raquel turned up unexpectedly on New Year's Eve 1999 to ask for a divorce. This episode was the first two-hander in the soap's history.

Curly met his second ex-wife, policewoman Emma Taylor (Angela Lonsdale), when she came to investigate a series of crimes in the area in which Curly was innocently implicated. The couple married and had a son who was born on Boxing Day 2001. As Norris Cole (Malcolm Hebden) had helped deliver the child, they decided to name him Ben, as it was Norris's middle name. Later, Emma committed perjury in order to protect a colleague, causing friction between herself and the ultra-honest Curly. The couple left the Street during 2003 to start a new life near Newcastle upon Tyne, in the small town of Ryton. When the character made a comeback for the 2010 spin-off DVD movie Coronation Street – A Knight's Tale, Curly revealed that his marriage to Emma had ended since their departure from Weatherfield.

In December 2024, Leanne Battersby mentions Curly, referencing to when she first moved to the street and her dad, Les Battersby headbutted him.

== Other appearances ==
Kevin Kennedy appeared in character as Curly on University Challenge Challenges Coronation Street, a special edition of University Challenge produced for the 1997 Comic Relief telethon.

== Reception ==
A writer from TV Guide was not impressed with the character and wanted him to leave the show. Profiling the character during Christmas 1990, they stated "now what would Curly Watts really like for Christmas? You might have some ideas of your own – a new haircut perhaps? – a one way ticket to Timbuktu?" Ayaan Ali from the Daily Mirror called Curly "a bit of a hopeless romantic" and noted how fans wrote on social media that they wanted Curly to return to the soap.
