= Jim McDonald (Coronation Street) =

Fictional character in British soap opera

- Coronation Street character
- Portrayed by: Charles Lawson
- Duration: 1989–2000, 2003–2005, 2007–2011, 2014, 2018
- First appearance: Episode 2984; 27 October 1989
- Last appearance: Episode 9585; 12 October 2018
- Introduced by: Mervyn Watson (1989); Kieran Roberts (2003); Tony Wood (2004); Steve Frost (2007); Kim Crowther (2009); Phil Collinson (2010); Stuart Blackburn (2014); Kate Oates (2018)
In-universe information
- Other names: James Stephen Mcdonald
- Occupation: Mechanic; Labourer; Barman; Pub landlord; Businessman
- Father: Edward McDonald
- Mother: Maisie McDonald
- Sisters: Eileen McDonald
- Wife: Liz McDonald (1974-1997, 2000–2005)
- Sons: Steve McDonald; Andy McDonald; Ben Driscoll
- Daughters: Katie McDonald
- Grandsons: Ruairi McDonald; Oliver Battersby; Ollie Driscoll; Will Driscoll
- Granddaughters: Amy Barlow; Emma Brooker
- Grandfathers: James McDonald
- Uncles: John McDonald
- Aunts: Flo McDonald
- First cousins: Christine

Jim McDonald (originally credited as MacDonald) is a fictional character from the British ITV soap opera Coronation Street, played by Charles Lawson. He made his first appearance during the episode broadcast on 27 October 1989. He appeared as a regular character from 1989 to 2000, and made brief comebacks between 2003 and 2018.

Jim was introduced in 1989 along with his wife Liz McDonald (Beverley Callard), and their two teenage sons Andy (Nicholas Cochrane) and Steve McDonald (Simon Gregson).

His storylines have often revolved around his family relationships and various crimes, which have resulted in several stints in prison. Early storylines for the character saw Jim and Liz's newborn daughter Katie die shortly after birth, followed by an alcohol addiction which led to domestic violence and the collapse of his marriage, as well as a near fatal fight with his son Steve, which resulted in temporary paralysis, as well as a one-night stand with Steve's ex-girlfriend Fiona Middleton (Angela Griffin). Jim had a brief relationship with Gwen Davies (Annie Hulley), before remarrying Liz and then being imprisoned for the manslaughter of Jez Quigley (Lee Boardman), in retaliation for a near fatal attack on Steve.

Later storylines have included Jim escaping from prison, Liz divorcing him for a second time, his attack on Liz's new husband Vernon Tomlin (Ian Reddington), being imprisoned for attempted robbery of a building society, being diagnosed with the degenerative illness myotonic dystrophy, and concocting a plan to swindle Liz out of her money by pretending he had found their daughter Katie. Jim died off-screen in March 2026 as part of Steve's storyline.

== Development ==
=== Original stint ===
Lawson was offered a role in Coronation Street in 1989 but turned it down. The following year, producers planned to introduce the McDonald family; the casting department approached Lawson again, and he accepted the part of Jim.

In 1999, Lawson announced his intention to leave the show. He later revealed that his decision was based on Jim's "improbable plot lines". He believed that writers were struggling to find stories for him, and feared his character may have been killed off had he not left. Lawson agreed to part company with the show and see what happened in the near future.

=== Reintroductions ===
Lawson returned to film guest appearances in 2003. The storyline had Jim escaping from prison to confront his wife, Liz (Beverley Callard), over a supposed affair. The duo decide to run away to Ireland, but the police managed to rearrest him before they are able to escape. In July 2007, it was reported that Lawson had agreed to return to filming in October that year for a special Christmas storyline. Lawson again reprised the role so Jim could attend Steve's wedding to Becky McDonald (Katherine Kelly). Lawson has said that he is happy to return any time there are 'juicy storylines' available.

On 11 April 2014, it was announced that Lawson had again agreed to reprise the role. He was signed to an initial three-month contract, with the possibility of an extension. Halina Watts from the Daily Mirror reported that despite Jim still being in prison, serving out his sentence for committing armed robbery, he would still "cause havoc" upon his screen return.

== Storylines ==
=== 1989–2000 ===
Jim first arrives in Coronation Street in October 1989 with his wife Liz McDonald (Beverley Callard) and two teenage sons Steve (Simon Gregson) and Andy McDonald (Nicholas Cochrane), buying 11 Coronation Street from Alf (Bryan Mosley) and Audrey Roberts (Sue Nicholls). He begins a bike repair shop and later becomes a mechanic for Kevin Webster (Michael Le Vell) at MVB Motors.

Jim suffers a personal tragedy with the death of his baby daughter, Katie McDonald. He splits from Liz soon afterwards after she berates him for punching Steve during an argument. Liz goes to manage a nearby pub for a while, but they soon reconcile and give their marriage another chance. By 1994, Jim is drinking heavily and his angry nature developed rapidly. He finds himself arguing repeatedly with family and friends and his marriage hits new depths in 1996 when he hits her at a service station in Macclesfield and drives off after she admits having an affair with a former army colleague many years earlier. Jim is arrested soon afterwards for trying to break into their house and after further breaching the conditions of a restraining order, he spends several weeks in prison for burglary and criminal damage.

Jim had a one-night stand with his son Steve's ex-girlfriend, Fiona Middleton (Angela Griffin). This results in Jim stopping her wedding to Alan McKenna (Glen Hugill) and confessing what had happened between them. As a result, Alan dumps Fiona as he now doubts that the child she is carrying is his. Steve is disgusted with Jim and reconciles with Fiona, helping her to raise her son, Morgan. Tests show that Jim's vasectomy hasn't failed and therefore Alan is Morgan's father but he still refuses to have any contact with Fiona or Morgan. Jim is badly injured after falling from scaffolding after a fight with Steve on a building site, and needs physiotherapy to regain his ability to walk. Jim then catches Liz in bed with Michael Wall (Dominic Rickhards), his physiotherapist, and throws her out. Jim and Liz soon agree to a divorce, and Liz leaves Coronation Street with Michael to start a new life in Milton Keynes. Steve is badly beaten by gangster Jez Quigley (Lee Boardman). Jim gets revenge by viciously beating Jez and leaving him unconscious in his flat. Jez later regains consciousness in hospital but collapses and dies from a ruptured Spleen after trying to suffocate Steve with a pillow while they are both in hospital. Jim gives himself up to the police and is remanded in prison to await trial. He remarries Liz and is later sentenced to eight years' imprisonment for manslaughter.

=== 2003–2011 ===
Three years into his sentence and a year before his scheduled release on licence, Jim escapes from prison as he fears that Liz is having an affair with her manager at a pub in Blackpool. He is soon recaptured and returns to prison. Jim makes an appearance in December 2004, phoning from prison to wish his family a happy Christmas. Jim fights with another inmate, cancelling his parole, as a result and he is ordered to stay in prison, as Liz gives up waiting for Jim and divorces him again.

Jim returns to the Street after being released early for good behaviour. On his return to the street, Jim seems to have changed for the better—a reformed character, teetotal and friendly to all. Steve gives him a job valeting cars at the cab firm and lets him see his granddaughter, Amy Barlow (Amber Chadwick). However, Jim is upset about Liz's upcoming wedding to drummer, Vernon Tomlin (Ian Reddington), and eventually it gets the better of him. On Liz and Vernon's wedding day, Jim gives Vernon a severe beating after Vernon launches at him and hits Dev Alahan (Jimmi Harkishin) in the process. Steve breaks up the fight, and in no uncertain terms tells his father he is no longer welcome, forcing Jim to leave the Street.

Jim returns for Steve's wedding to Becky Granger (Katherine Kelly) along with Andy. When Becky is arrested and accused of dealing drugs, Jim finds out about Slug (Marshall Lancaster), the person who planted the drugs, and suggests to Steve that he give copies of Slug's photos to taxi businesses around Weatherfield, in the hope someone will recognise him and leaves again with Andy.

Jim returns to celebrate his 55th birthday with Steve. He meets Becky's nephew, Max Turner (Harry McDermott), and catches up with Kevin in The Rovers. He also attends the funeral of old friend Jack Duckworth (Bill Tarmey). The next day, Jim sends Liz some flowers which are intercepted by her new boyfriend, Owen Armstrong (Ian Puleston-Davies), who goes to The Flying Horse and warns Jim to stay away. Jim later goes to The Rovers and bumps into Owen again, goading him about the flowers and telling Steve what Owen has done. On 1 December 2010, Jim returns again and is disappointed that Liz is not there. He clashes with Owen again, and then later phones Steve, telling him that he is in hospital after getting into a fight in a pub.

Steve visits him, along with Owen, and after Steve has gone, Owen hints to Jim that he is behind the attack. When Steve goes to collect Jim from the hospital, Jim warns Steve that Owen was behind the beating, and asks him to watch out for his and Liz's safety.

In March 2011, Jim meets Liz in a hotel bar. They have a drink, and Liz tells him about Steve and Becky; he suggests that she buy the pub from Steve. Jim later walks Liz to her room and it is revealed that they had a one-night stand whilst in Spain. They agree to give their complicated marriage another go. He finds out that Steve and Becky bought a child called Max from Becky's sister, Kylie Turner (Paula Lane). The next day, he goes to The Rovers to speak to them and they tell him that they have had a fallout with Liz. Jim later meets up with Liz in the café and tells her that he thinks Becky is controlling Steve. In April, Jim agrees to buy the Rovers, which costs £120,000 in total and would allow Becky and Steve to flee the country. After numerous failed attempts to raise the money, he asks Kevin, who has just won the lottery, to put forward the cash and become a silent partner in the pub, which Kevin agrees to think about. Confident that things are finally falling into place for him, he joins Liz behind the bar.

The next day, he visits Kevin at the garage, but is stunned when Kevin reveals that he feels the venture is too risky. Jim reveals to Kevin how badly he needs the money, but despite begging, Kevin will not budge. A desperate Jim then thinks he has no alternative other than to rob a bank, and calls an old friend to receive a gun.

He later goes into the bank, and pulls out the gun to the receptionist. She gets him the money but also hits the panic button, which automatically alerts the police that something is wrong. He almost gets out of the bank successfully but bumps into a woman as he quickly paces out, revealing his gun to everyone. Chaos ensues, and as he attempts to calm everybody down, he is struck on the head with a chair. He furiously punches the attacker but before he can leave, he sees the police arrive outside and realises that he has no chance of escape.

Jim takes everyone in the bank hostage and tells a policeman over the phone that he will only co-operate if they get Liz to come down to the bank, to which they agree. After much talking, Liz manages to convince Jim to let the hostages go and come out. The police promptly arrest Jim and he shouts 'Elizabeth, I'm sorry!' to Liz as he is handcuffed in a police car.

The following day, Liz visits Jim and tells him she will be there when he comes out, and joins Andy in Spain. Steve visits Jim to inform him Liz has left, but will attend the trial. Steve visits Jim in custody and tells him that Liz has gone back to Spain. In October, Jim is sentenced to seven years imprisonment.

=== 2014 ===
Jim is tracked down in prison by fellow inmate Peter Barlow (Chris Gascoyne). Jim has the nickname "The Landlord" in prison, due to his reputation of illegally selling alcohol to other prisoners. Jim agrees to give him booze, but then proceeds to cruelly blackmail Peter in a bid to get in contact with his son Steve in order to repair their relationship. Jim also wants to reconcile with Liz and be a part of his granddaughter Amy's (now played by Elle Mulvaney) life. Liz later visits Jim in prison and tells him that she and Steve want nothing more to do with him, and that he lost his family years ago. A short while later, Jim finds Peter passed out from the booze he gave him, and saves his life by calling the medical services.

Steve hears what happened and hopes that his father might finally be a changed man. He visits Jim inside and, eventually, they reconcile as father and son. Steve also promises to bring Amy to see him, leaving Jim delighted that things have worked out in his favour. He is, however, concerned that Peter will reveal how he got the alcohol, and so pleads with him not to do so, even going as far as to threaten him. Peter then angrily tells Tracy Barlow (Kate Ford) that Jim had given him the booze, despite knowing that he was a recovering alcoholic, which in turn Tracy reveals to Steve. Steve refuses to visit Jim or bring Amy, and cuts off contact. Devastated and furious, Jim has Peter beaten up.

At the request of Peter's stepmother Deirdre Barlow (Anne Kirkbride), Liz goes to visit Jim in order to stop him from harming Peter further. Jim turns to blackmail, as he tells Liz that he will lay off Peter as long as she continues to see him. Liz complies, although when her boyfriend Tony Stewart (Terence Maynard) breaks off with her, she tells Jim that it is over, and leaves the prison.

When Liz tells Jim it will be her last visit, Jim reveals that he will soon be transferred to an open prison, which would allow him to be closer to the family, and even return for visits to the street. Liz is disgusted, and tells Steve that he has been using them both all along, since he knew full well that he would soon be out of prison.

An angry Steve arranges a visit and confronts Jim. Jim attempts to convince him that he was only trying to get his family back, and that his heart was in the right place, but Steve furiously retorts that he has harmed numerous people along the way, including beating Peter up and blackmailing Liz. He grasses Jim up, revealing to officers that he had been using a mobile phone to harass Liz, which ruins his chances of being moved to an open prison. Jim is apoplectic with rage, and has to be restrained by the prison guards, whilst threatening Steve with revenge as they take him away. Steve, however, is not fazed, and brands his father a "joke". It is to be believed that his sentence was extended because of his illegal actions.

In 2016, Jim calls Steve and receives a frosty reception from his son, who attempts to hang up. However, Jim shocks him by revealing that he has a potentially serious hereditary condition called myotonic dystrophy and suggests that Steve get himself and Amy tested, as it passes down to offspring.

=== 2018 ===
Jim is released from Highfield Prison, and after a few weeks, he returns to Weatherfield, to the shock and dismay of Liz and Steve. Jim again claims that he is a changed man, although both refuse to buy into his claims. Jim meets with Liz at the Viaduct Bistro, and reveals to her that he found out their daughter Katie is still alive, as there was a mix up at the hospital over 20 years ago, and later introduces her to Hannah Gilmore (Hannah Ellis Ryan), supposedly their biological daughter.

The revelation shocks Liz, although she is later ecstatic that she would finally be able to properly get to know the girl she thought she had lost. However, unknown to Liz and everyone else, Hannah is in fact impersonating Katie, and Jim is in on the scheme in order to get revenge on his family for abandoning him in prison. Jim shares a kiss with her in the car following the meeting with Liz at the bistro, feeling victorious at tricking her.

When Steve questions whether Hannah is actually their daughter, Jim arranges for a second DNA test to be made, which Hannah later tampers with in order to fool Liz and Steve. Later on, in the pub, Hannah plants the seed in Liz's head that her and Jim need treatment for the myotonic dystrophy disease, and need the money fast. Jim, however, starts to feel guilty about his role in the con after visiting Katie's grave, and it's clear that cracks are starting to set in.

Hannah stages a fall in The Rovers in order to convince Liz into letting her stay with her, which Jim is initially annoyed at, because she did not tell him beforehand, but is later secretly pleased that he will see more of Liz. After more hints from Hannah, Liz decides to check her savings, and finds out that she can raise £10,000 for the treatment.

Jim and Hannah realise this is not enough, and when Steve reveals that he is spending an enormous amount of money on his wedding to Tracy, they decide to target Johnny Connor (Richard Hawley). Jim had discovered that Liz and Johnny had slept together, despite Johnny being married to Jenny Connor (Sally Ann Matthews), and they send him an anonymous text demanding £50,000.

Seeing that Johnny is panicking over his blackmailer, Jim and Hannah are confident that they will soon be out of Weatherfield with the money. Despite this, Jim is still torn between wanting to be with his family. This increases when Liz becomes closer to him, and Steve asks him to be his best man, both of them apologising for abandoning him in prison.

Happier than ever, Jim slowly starts to distance himself from Hannah and the scheme. After Johnny tricks Hannah into receiving a fake bag of money, which also reveals to him that she is the blackmailer, he tells Liz, who becomes suspicious of her, despite Hannah's lying explanation. Still completely trusting Jim, Liz speaks to him about it, and expresses her wish that she had been a better mother. As Jim acts as a shoulder to cry on, all thoughts of Hannah are forgotten. He later kisses Liz, not realising that Hannah has witnessed it all.

On the day of Steve and Tracy's wedding, Jim discovers that Liz has sent the money. When he is confronted by Hannah over the kiss, he says that it was simply to keep Liz sweet, and that it has worked, because she has sent the money. Hannah, forgiving Jim, is ecstatic, and says that they can finally leave. Jim, however, wanting to stay with his family, attempts to fool Hannah by telling her to leave now, and that he will follow her on in a few days, in order to avoid suspicion.

Hannah refuses to leave, telling him that they started this together, and they will leave together, so a frustrated Jim tells her that they will stay for the wedding. When Liz tells Jim that she loves him and wants to start again, Jim makes up his mind to stay, and they kiss, which is once again seen by Hannah. After Jim insults her and says that his and Liz's love is true, Hannah decides to trick Jim and reveal the scam to Liz.

After asking Jim to see her in private, Hannah feigns forgiveness, and says that she has decided to leave so that Jim can be with Liz. Jim is delighted that he will soon have his family back, and accepts Hannah's request of one last kiss. However, it is then revealed that Liz was in the bathroom the whole time, and walks out to see the kiss, leaving Jim horrified.

Whilst Jim desperately tries to explain, Hannah spitefully reveals the entire scam, including that she is not their daughter. Liz leaves, on the verge of tears. Jim follows, but not before giving Hannah a look of pure anger, which she returns with a grin. Jim pleads with Liz when they are outside, but she angrily pushes him to the ground and calls him a monster. Having lost everything again, Jim walks around by himself and is spotted by Hannah. She forgives him for what he said, and tells him to get in the car. Although Jim is furious with her, he reluctantly gets in after realising she is all he has left, and the two of them leave for Belfast.

Two months later, Liz receives a phone call from the police saying that Jim and Hannah have been found and arrested for their scam. However, due to a lack of evidence, and the fact that Liz handed her money over willingly, they could not be charged, and so were allowed to walk free. Jim never returns to Weatherfield, and dies of pneumonia in March 2026.

== Reception ==
Jim's 2018 return storyline won the accolade for Most Bizarre Soap Storyline at the 2018 Digital Spy Reader Awards.

Jim has earned a reputation as being a "bad boy" character in the media. David Brown of Radio Times branded him a "fiery hard man". Claire Hodgson of the Daily Mirror said that setting fire to Gwen Davies' (Annie Hulley) furniture, threatening Liz, hangovers, fights in the Rovers Return and robbing the bank were some of Jim's "most outrageous" moments on the show. Lorna Cooper, writing for MSN, said that she wanted Jim back in Coronation Street full-time and branded him and Liz a "knock-off version of Elizabeth Taylor and Richard Burton." A writer from ITVX put Jim on their list of Liz' top ten lovers, writing "The love of Elizabeth's life. Liz was a teenage bride when they married in 1974. They split in 1996. Remarried in 2000 but divorced again in 2005. Even from behind bars Jim continued to circle Liz's life, but in 2014 Liz made it pretty clear that she never wanted to see him again. Whether she can stick to that, we'll have to wait and see!"

== See also ==
- List of soap opera villains
