= Suzanne Hall =

Australian-British actress (b. 1972)

Suzanne Hall (born 1972) is an Australian-born British actress.

Hall has played Suzanne Ashworth in Channel 4 soap opera Hollyoaks, from 2005 to 2010 and again in 2011 and 2012. She again reprised the role in 2024. She was previously best known as Curly Watts's sometime love interest Kimberley Taylor in Coronation Street. Her on-screen father was played by actor John Jardine who now plays her father-in-law in Hollyoaks. She also had a minor role as a GP in series 4 of the Manchester drama Cold Feet. In 1987, she appeared in a children's television programme called Jossy's Giants about a fictional youth football team, playing Opal, girlfriend of goalkeeper Harvey. As well as being an actress, Hall is a qualified teacher, who teaches media studies at Our Lady and St John Catholic College in Blackburn, Lancashire.
