= Simon Gregson =

English actor (born 1974)

- Born: Simon Alan Gregory; 2 October 1974 (age 52); Wythenshawe, Manchester, England
- Occupation: Actor
- Years active: 1989–present
- Known for: Role of Steve McDonald in Coronation Street
- Spouse: Emma Gleave (m. 2010)
- Children: 3

Simon Alan Gregory (born 2 October 1974), better known by his stage name, Simon Gregson, is a British actor from Manchester, England. He is best known for his portrayal of Steve McDonald in the long-running ITV soap opera Coronation Street since 1989. He has received 17 awards for comedy and performance, plus a Legends of Industry Award.

== Early life ==
Whilst a pupil at The Kingsway School, Stockport, in 1989, Simon Gregory entered a search for the part of one of two new cast members to join the ITV soap opera Coronation Street as the 'McDonald Twins'. Fellow Kingsway pupil Nicholas Cochrane was selected out of the class to become Andy McDonald, and a search was on for another class member who had the same height, build and hair colouring as him. As Gregory was the only member of the class to fit these criteria, he was selected and the two were sent for further auditions at Granada Television, where they were selected for the roles. Gregory was initially credited under his real name, but later adopted the stage name 'Gregson' once he was old enough to join Equity, as there was already a member with the name Simon Gregory.

== Coronation Street ==
Gregson's first appearance in an episode of Coronation Street aired on 6 December 1989 and he currently appears on the soap as a regular cast member. It was announced on 19 September 2015 that Gregson was to take an extended break from the show for personal reasons. He returned to the soap in 2016.

== Television appearances ==
In 2009, along with Coronation Street co-star Michelle Keegan, he appeared in the third part of Red Dwarf: Back to Earth as himself.

On 20 August 2011, he appeared on All Star Family Fortunes along with his family.

On 7 July 2013, he took part in ITV game show Tipping Point: Lucky Stars.

He appeared as a panellist on an episode of Through the Keyhole which aired on 5 October 2013.

In 2013, he appeared multiple times in the ITV daytime quiz show Show Me the Telly.

He has appeared in an episode of Big Star's Little Star on 23 April 2014.

He took part in Celebrity Haunted Mansion in February 2018. He was the series winner.

On 20 February 2021, he took part in the ITV Game show Catchphrase Celebrity special.

In 2021, Gregson participated on the twenty-first series of I'm a Celebrity...Get Me Out of Here! and finished in second place.

== Awards ==
=== Nominated ===
- 2005 – British Soap Award for Best Actor
- 2009 – TRIC Award for TV Soap Personality
- 2009 – British Soap Award for Best Actor
- 2009 – British Soap Award for Best Comedy Performance
- 2009 – British Soap Award for Best On-Screen Partnership, alongside Katherine Kelly
- 2010 – TRIC Award for TV Soap Personality
- 2010 – British Soap Award for Best On-Screen Partnership, alongside Katherine Kelly
- 2010 – TV Quick Award for Best Soap Actor
- 2010 – National Television Award for Most Popular Serial Drama Performance
- 2011 – British Soap Award for Best On-Screen Partnership, alongside Katherine Kelly
- 2011 – TV Quick Award for Best Soap Actor
- 2019 – British Soap Award for Best On-Screen Partnership, alongside Kate Ford

=== Won ===
- 2009 – TV Quick Award for Best Soap Actor
- 2014 – British Soap Award for Best Comedy Performance
- 2017 – Legends of Industry Award for Television Acting

== Personal life ==
Gregson has been married to long-term partner Emma Gleave since 2010. They have three sons; Alfie (born 2007), Harry (born 2009) and Henry Teddy (born 2016).
