= Nicholas Cochrane =

English actor

- Born: Nicholas Marc Cochrane; Wythenshawe, England
- Occupation: Actor
- Years active: 1989–present

Nicholas Marc Cochrane is an English actor, known for his role as Andy McDonald in the ITV soap opera Coronation Street.

== Career ==
Cochrane had appeared as an extra on TV for Coronation Street's production company, Granada TV, prior to his successful audition in 1989 for the role of Andy McDonald. Cochrane's character stayed in the programme for seven years before he was axed, along with several other cast members, in a high-profile cull by a new producer in 1997. His character took a job as an English teacher in Spain, but has since returned for two short spells so that Andy McDonald could be seen attending the remarriage of his parents and later being best man at his brother's wedding to Becky Granger.

In 2004, Cochrane co-launched a short-lived magazine about soap operas named Into Soap under the newly formed company Treble Media Ltd. However, due to fierce competition from other publications such as Inside Soap and Soaplife, the magazine ran into financial difficulties. Despite the selling of the title to a London company and gaining a readership of 75,000, Into Soap folded in September 2008. The closure of the publication resulted in job losses, unpaid bills to staff and photographers and Cochrane having to sell his house after filing for bankruptcy. He has also co-hosted a show on Peak FM in Chesterfield, Derbyshire. Cochrane's other television roles have included playing the character of a golf professional Barry Scripps in ITV's Heartbeat. Other television guest appearances have included Loose Women (ITV1), Canada AM (national breakfast TV), The South Bank Show (ITV1), Live and Kicking (BBC1), To Me To You (CBBC), Confessions (ITV), Win, Lose or Draw (ITV1), and Celebrity Eggheads (BBC2).

In addition, Cochrane has contributed to many Coronation Street-related entertainment shows and documentaries including Farewell Liz, a tribute to Beverley Callard in 2011. Other shows all for ITV stations or for commercial DVD release have included: A Nightmare on Coronation Street, The Kids from Coronation Street, Women of Coronation Street, Coronation Street Through the Keyhole, The Stars of the street 50 years 50 classic characters, Happy Birthday Coronation Street, Classic Coronation Street, Coronation Street Secrets and Coronation Street: The McDonald Family Album. In 2012, he participated in a sold-out Canadian theatre tour, Tales from the Street, which saw him and other Coronation Street stars talk candidly about the soap. He was an executive producer of the tour which earned rave reviews. He has also turned his hand at television presenting with appearances on Granada TV and MUTV where Cochrane interviewed footballers Roy Keane and David Beckham.

In addition to giving many radio interviews Cochrane has also presented and guest presented on radio for a number of commercial stations including nationally on Talksport. Cochrane starred in a nationwide tour of Spring and Port Wine with the Middle Ground Theatre Company, which was a Manchester Evening News theatre award winner. He has appeared in various pantomime productions, including Jack and the Beanstalk, Aladdin and Cinderella. 2014 saw Cochrane appear on Piers Morgan's Life Stories in an episode about Callard, his on-screen mother in Coronation Street.

On 2 September 2019, he guest starred in an episode of the BBC soap opera Doctors as Dean Telford, a debt-ridden dad who owes money to a local businessman and has to use his pizza business to deal drugs. He appeared again on 24 January 2022, in the role of Kenny Coles.

== Personal life ==
Cochrane lives in Manchester with his wife Denise and their two children.
