= Kevin Kennedy (actor) =

English actor, writer, producer, singer and guitarist (born 1961)

- Born: Kevin Patrick Williams; 4 September 1961 (age 65); Wythenshawe, Manchester, England
- Occupations: Actor and musician
- Years active: 1982–present
- Known for: Coronation Street (1983–2003)
- Spouse: Clare Kennedy (m. 1996)
- Children: 3

Kevin Kennedy (born Kevin Patrick Williams; 4 September 1961) is an English actor and musician, best known for playing Curly Watts for 20 years on ITV's long-running soap opera Coronation Street.

== Early life ==
Kennedy was born Kevin Patrick Williams on 4 September 1961, in Wythenshawe, Manchester. He attended St. Paul's Catholic High School and was a member of Manchester Youth Theatre. Kennedy later studied drama at Manchester Polytechnic.

== Career ==
Kennedy was in the band the Paris Valentinos with Johnny Marr and Andy Rourke, who later formed half of The Smiths.

In Early 80’s he was in an Irish band called Borderline.

Between 1983 and 2003, Kennedy played the character of Norman "Curly" Watts in the TV soap Coronation Street. Among other jobs, the character started as a paperboy, then became a dustman, and was later an assistant manager at a supermarket. The character had two marriages, producing two children; one from each wife. After a short break from acting whilst recovering from an alcohol addiction in 2000, he released a single, "Bulldog Nation", with his band the Bunch of Thieves, on the RCA Records label. The single peaked at No. 70 on the UK Singles Chart.

He returned to Coronation Street a few months later, before being written out permanently in September 2003. In an interview in 2009, Kennedy said that he would consider a return to the show and it was later confirmed that he would film scenes for its fiftieth anniversary DVD. However, more than twenty years after his departure, he has yet to make a return. Kennedy was the writer and producer of the 2005 television series Spanish Capers. A second series was recorded in 2006–2007 for BSkyB.

In 2009, Kennedy played the part of aging hippie "Pop" in the touring production of Queen & Ben Elton's We Will Rock You before joining the cast of the West End London production in 2010. In 2015, Kennedy was asked to be involved with the launch of the world's third-largest cruise liner "RCI Anthem of the Seas" appearing in a West End production of "We Will Rock You". He has appeared many times on board as Pop; most recently in the UK Seacation cruises from Southampton in October 2023, and in February 2024 several performances from Bayonne, NJ to the Caribbean.

He also appeared in the 2009 "Scent from Heaven?" advert for Daz, as part of the company's "Cleaner Close" campaign. In 2010, Kennedy, along with several other Coronation Street stars, contributed to Trisha Ward's album Rogues, Angels, Heroes and Fools, recorded for the fiftieth anniversary of the soap. In 2017, he played Graham Ollerinshaw, a David Bowie tribute act, in an episode of the BBC's Holby City.

In 2019, he appeared in Cinderella at Cambridge Arts Theatre.

He played an angel in the Christmas episode of Mrs Brown's Boys on 25 December 2019.

In 2026, he was cast as Mr Isaacs on The Picture of Dorian Gray: The Musical: The Official Cast Recording and originated the role of that character later that year in the musical’s opening run.

== Personal life ==
Kennedy is married and has two children. He serves as the co founder and patron of Kennedy Street Foundation CiO, a Brighton based charity, with his wife Clare, who is the charity’s co-founder and CEO, the charity offers free support and signposting to anyone looking to recover from addiction, including family members. They also offer workplace recovery training, mental health workshops, various recovery focused programmes and a professional advice and recovery coaching service to the business sector

== Credits ==
=== Acting ===
Year(s)	Title	Role
1983	Dear Ladies	Boy in photo booth
1983–2003	Coronation Street	Norman "Curly" Watts; 1,563 episodes
1984	Keep on Running	Pete Bennett
2005–2007	Spanish Capers	Presenter
2006	Blue Murder	Donny McAvoy
2006	Doctors	Mick Carter
2010	Coronation Street: A Knights Tale	Norman "Curly" Watts
2010	We Will Rock You	Pop
2017	Holby City	Graham Ollerinshaw
2018–2019	Rock of Ages	Dennis Dupree
2019	Mrs Brown's Boys	Clyde (The Angel)
2026	The Picture of Dorian Gray: The Musical	Mr Isaacs

=== Albums ===
Year(s)	Title
2000	Bulldog Nation
2002	Present Kennedy
2010	Rogues, Heroes, Angels & Fools
