= Coronation Street Live (2000 episode) =

Episode 4945
- Coronation Street episode
- Directed by: Tony Prescott
- Written by: Peter Whalley
- Original air date: 8 December 2000
- Running time: 60 minutes (including commercials)

Guest appearances
- Prince Charles; Trevor McDonald; Noddy Holder as Stan Potter

Episode chronology
| ← Previous; Episode 4944 | Next → Episode 4946 |

Coronation Street Live is a live episode of the British soap opera Coronation Street which was broadcast on Friday 8 December 2000 as part of the show's 40th anniversary celebrations. The episode was an hour long and aired at 8:00pm. It aired one hour after a repeat of the first episode, and included an introduction by actor William Roache from the soap's outdoor set, where last-minute preparations for the live episode were under way. The episode was number 4945 in the series and was the first live edition to be broadcast since Episode 17, which aired on 3 February 1961. It was seen by 17 million viewers.

Scenes for the episode were broadcast live from the Coronation Street outdoor set and the Stage One studio complex next door. The episode charted the events of a single day. However, because transmission was during the hours of darkness, all scenes set outdoors appeared near the beginning or end of the programme. Scenes meant to be set during the daytime were studio based.

The episode is notable for an appearance by Charles, Prince of Wales who visited the show's Manchester-based studios earlier in the day and met cast members. Footage of him meeting actress Sue Nicholls was incorporated into the storyline following prior agreement with the Prince's staff; this is the only part of the episode which was pre-recorded.

== Plot ==
With council workmen set to arrive to begin digging up the Street's cobble stones and replacing them with tarmac, Ken Barlow (William Roache) and Duggie Ferguson (John Bowe) decide to make up a rota so that the Street's entrance will be continuously manned by demonstrators.

Vera Duckworth (Liz Dawn) is critical but stable at Weatherfield General, having had an allergic reaction to the antibiotics. Tyrone Dobbs (Alan Halsall) and Maria Sutherland (Samia Ghadie) convince Vera's husband, Jack (Bill Tarmey), to go home and rest, as he has been at Vera's bedside all night. However, when Martin Platt (Sean Wilson) advises them that Jack should not stay away for too long, Tyrone panics and phones Curly Watts (Kevin Kennedy) to ask him to fetch Jack. Curly, who is speaking on the phone in The Kabin, is overheard by Norris Cole (Malcolm Hebden), who misinterprets the conversation and believes that Vera has died.

Audrey Roberts (Sue Nicholls) brags to Rita Sullivan (Barbara Knox) about her upcoming lunch date with Prince Charles, who is visiting Weatherfield to open a new planning office at the Town Hall. Before she leaves, she calls into Roy's Rolls to warn Ken and Duggie that the tarmackers are getting a court injunction meaning the police will be able to remove the demonstrators. Ken is working on getting a preservation order from Northern Heritage but fears this may take too long.

Hayley Cropper (Julie Hesmondhalgh) questions her husband, Roy (David Neilson), about their interview with Peter Hartnell, but Roy is more concerned with the demo. At The Rovers Return Inn, Natalie Barnes (Denise Welch) tells Liz McDonald (Beverley Callard) that she will be spending the day with the brewery, who are going to show her around other pubs. Natalie later overhears Liz and Geena Gregory (Jennifer James) express their pity for her situation as a single mother with a pub to run. Duggie tells Natalie about his experiences growing up in a pub, which make her even more worried.

Jack reads a letter from Vera aloud to Curly. Jack is moved by Vera's words but tries not to shed tears. In her letter, Vera confesses to an affair which she had before their son, Terry (Nigel Pivaro), was born, which led to her uncertainty over Terry's paternity. Jack tells Curly he knew about the affair, and it ended after he beat up the man concerned; Vera never found out. Jack explains that he knows Terry is his son, because he reminds him of the way he used to be. Jack and Curly are joined by Emily Bishop (Eileen Derbyshire), who has been told that Vera has died and come to offer her sympathies. Jack and Curly race to the hospital, where they are relieved to learn that there has been no change in Vera's condition.

News of Vera's apparent death spreads to The Rovers, putting a dampener on the spirits of the protesters. Curly and Emily confer and, realising that Norris was the source of the false rumour, confront him. Curly later puts the record straight. Just as everybody celebrates the fact that Vera has not died, Audrey returns from her lunch with Prince Charles and says the tarmackers will arrive soon with a police escort. Eileen Grimshaw (Sue Cleaver) overhears and hatches a plan.

Terry arrives at the hospital having heard about Vera. Jack stops him leaving and berates him. Terry breaks down when he sees Vera. As Curly returns, Vera starts to regain consciousness, managing to utter a few words. Terry watches from outside the hospital room.

The tarmackers arrive and the police give the demonstrators five minutes to move or they will be arrested. Norris is ready to admit defeat but Ken and Duggie persuade everybody to stay put. Ken manages to stall the police by saying he's waiting for his solicitor, but with the officers' patience wearing thin, the demonstrators still refuse to move. As the police begin manhandling them away, Eileen and Dennis Stringer (Charles Dale) blockade the Street with a convoy of taxis from StreetCars; Steve McDonald (Simon Gregson) knows nothing about the scheme, however, and, when he arrives on the scene, he is annoyed when the police threaten to tow the vehicles away.

Peter Barlow (Chris Gascoyne) arrives in a taxi as the residents celebrate their brief victory. He is not surprised to find Ken at the centre of things. Peter tells Deirdre Rachid (Anne Kirkbride) and Blanche Hunt (Maggie Jones) that he has left the Navy and that his wife Jessica has left him. He goes for a drink in The Rovers and tries to chat up Linda Baldwin (Jacqueline Pirie), unaware that she is married to Mike Baldwin (Johnny Briggs), but becomes aware of her identity after making a fool of himself.

Natalie, Geena and Liz watch the ITV Evening News on which Sir Trevor McDonald reads an item about Prince Charles' visit to Manchester. Audrey is seen being presented to the Prince at Weatherfield Town Hall. Hayley finally finds the opportunity to speak to Roy. She is distressed that Roy does not see her as a woman, and when he clarifies that he does not think of her in the same way as other women, before going off to join the demonstrators, Hayley writes him a letter, packs her bags and leaves their flat.

Ken realises that the preservation order will not arrive in time to save the cobbles. However, Duggie realises that nobody knows what the preservation order looks like, so creates a fake preservation order, which will hopefully fool the police long enough for the real one to arrive. They type it on Ken's laptop before emailing it to Stan Potter (Noddy Holder), a friend of Duggie's, who prints a hard copy for them. With the cars moved, the police give the tarmackers the go-ahead to start work, but Stan arrives just in time to deliver the fake preservation order. The police are sceptical, but order the tarmackers to pack up for the night. The residents celebrate their victory, jeering at Les Battersby (Bruce Jones) when he tries to join in. Roy reads Hayley's letter and frantically searches for her as the celebrations are under way. Natalie tells Geena she plans to sell The Rovers to a pub chain. Ken leads the demonstrators in a toast to tradition and community.

== Background ==
The announcement that Coronation Street would air a live episode to celebrate its 40th anniversary was first made by Granada Television in August 2000. Television producers in the United States had recently experimented with live episodes to great success, with a live edition of the hospital drama ER attracting 42 million viewers, and Granada Television believed that a live episode would be an ideal way to celebrate Coronation Street's 40th anniversary (a number of episodes, including the first one on 9 December 1960 had been recorded live). The show's producer, Jane Macnaught, said: "It will mean a lot of hard work for the cast and production team involved, but I know it will be an enjoyable and exhilarating experience."

At this point few details were available of any potential storyline, but a spokeswoman said that the episode would see one of the characters have a serious health condition, while a couple would be faced with a personal dilemma. Other events to mark the anniversary would include a documentary about the life of actor Bill Roache, who had played the role of Ken Barlow since the soap's inception, and a tribute programme called Forty Years of Coronation Street.

On 5 December, it was announced that the Slade singer Noddy Holder would make a cameo appearance in the episode as a character named Stan. The actor John Savident who played Fred Elliott was also due to appear, but was unable to take part following an attack on him in his home by an intruder. It was also reported that because the episode would be aired at night cast members had been rehearsing many of the scenes in the evening as part of their preparations. Cast members did not usually rehearse before recording scenes, but it was reported they had spent forty hours rehearsing for the episode.

On 8 December, Prince Charles visited the Granada Studios in Manchester and unveiled a plaque on the set to celebrate the soap's 40th anniversary. The plaque was located on a wall next to the Rovers Return Inn, but would eventually be moved to a green room where cast members relax between scenes. He also met cast members, including the actress Sue Nicholls. Footage of their meeting was later incorporated into the live episode, which showed a news report of Nicholls' character Audrey Roberts being presented to the Prince at the opening of a new planning office at Weatherfield Town Hall. An hour before the 8:00pm episode was due to be aired, ITV showed a repeat of the first episode from 1960. The episode was preceded by an introduction from William Roache, who was on set preparing to take part in the live episode. The live episode itself was preceded by a montage featuring the Coronation Street cast members over which was played the popular song "You're Nobody till Somebody Loves You". The sequence ended with the caption "Coronation Street - Forty Years - Thank You".

== Opening and closing scenes ==
The programme's title sequence was not used at the beginning of the episode. Instead, the opening moment of the first scene was transmitted in black and white with a "scratchy film" overlay meant to simulate apparent early broadcasts. Ironically the scratchy film effect associated with older episodes is a result of filmed versions of videotaped or live episodes, made for international markets. The original episodes as viewed in the 1960s would have been live or on videotape with no film grain. The first scene showed Sarah Platt telling her brother David to come inside to get ready for school. The end credits of the episode included the caption: "With thanks to H.R.H. The Prince of Wales".

== DVD releases ==
The Live episode was included in the Golden Anniversary DVD Collection, released by ITV Home Entertainment on 11 October 2010. Also available as part of the Stars of the Street - 50 Years, 50 Classic Characters DVD set released on the same day.

== Characters and cast ==
- Jimmi Harkishin as Dev Alahan
- Jacqueline Pirie as Linda Baldwin
- Johnny Briggs as Mike Baldwin
- William Roache as Ken Barlow
- Chris Gascoyne as Peter Barlow
- Denise Welch as Natalie Barnes
- Vicky Entwistle as Janice Battersby
- Bruce Jones as Les Battersby
- Georgia Taylor as Toyah Battersby
- Eileen Derbyshire as Emily Bishop
- Malcolm Hebden as Norris Cole
- Julie Hesmondhalgh as Hayley Cropper
- David Neilson as Roy Cropper
- Alan Halsall as Tyrone Dobbs
- Bill Tarmey as Jack Duckworth
- Nigel Pivaro as Terry Duckworth
- Liz Dawn as Vera Duckworth
- John Bowe as Duggie Ferguson
- Jennifer James as Geena Gregory
- Sue Cleaver as Eileen Grimshaw
- Maggie Jones as Blanche Hunt
- Beverley Callard as Liz McDonald
- Simon Gregson as Steve McDonald
- Steven Arnold as Ashley Peacock
- Jack P. Shepherd as David Platt
- Sean Wilson as Martin Platt
- Tina O'Brien as Sarah-Louise Platt
- Anne Kirkbride as Deirdre Rachid
- Sue Nicholls as Audrey Roberts
- Charles Dale as Dennis Stringer
- Barbara Knox as Rita Sullivan
- Samia Ghadie as Maria Sutherland
- Kevin Kennedy as Curly Watts
- Angela Lonsdale as Emma Watts
- Steve Garti as Sean Swift
- John Graham Davies as Police Sergeant
- Noddy Holder as Stan Potter
- Donna Lythgoe as Nurse Dooley
- Trevor McDonald as himself

== 50th anniversary ==
As the show's 50th anniversary approached, there was some speculation about the possibility of another live edition, particularly after rival soap EastEnders aired a live edition to celebrate its 25th anniversary on air on 19 February 2010. In April 2010, Bill Roache confirmed that ITV would not be airing another live edition. He said; "We're not going to do a live episode, we did that in the Millennium year [the show's 40th anniversary], we don't want to do that again." However, on 29 August, actor Keith Duffy said that Coronation Street would air a live episode to celebrate its 50th anniversary, something which was confirmed on 1 September by ITV. The episode was aired on Thursday 9 December as part of a week long celebration of the show's 50th birthday.

== Subsequent showings ==
The 40th Live episode was repeated on 10 December 2020 on ITV3, as part of the 60th Anniversary celebrations of Coronation Street.
