= Toyah Battersby =

Fictional character from Coronation Street

- Coronation Street character
- Portrayed by: Georgia Taylor
- Duration: 1997–2003, 2016–present
- First appearance: 4 July 1997
- Introduced by: Brian Park (1997); Kate Oates (2016)
In-universe information
- Other names: Toyah Habeeb; Toyah Laverne Battersby
- Occupation: Student; Waitress; Barmaid; Pub landlady; Counsellor
- Father: Ronnie Clegg
- Mother: Janice Battersby
- Stepfather: Les Battersby
- Sisters: Leanne Battersby (step)
- Husband: Toby Chapman (2011–2017); Imran Habeeb (2022)
- Daughters: Rose Battersby
- Adoptive daughters: Kelly Neelan (foster); Elsie (foster)
- Stepsons: Alfie Franklin
- Nephews: Oliver Battersby (step)

Toyah Battersby (also Habeeb) is a fictional character from the British ITV soap opera Coronation Street, played by Georgia Taylor. Toyah and her family were introduced to the serial by executive producer Brian Park in a bid to increase falling ratings. Actress and singer Toyah Willcox gave the producers permission to name the youngest member of the Battersby family after herself, since the character was said to be born during the height of her career. Taylor originally auditioned for the part of Zoe Tattersall, but was cast as Toyah instead. The role marked her acting debut. She made her first screen appearance during the episode broadcast on 4 July 1997.

Toyah was portrayed as cocky, naive, too trusting and occasionally needing to be "a bit more clued up" about things. Taylor called Toyah a decent person and someone who was loyal to her friends and family. Taylor initially disliked Toyah's image, particularly her make-up and clothes, which were too revealing. Toyah's first major storyline saw her being abducted by a stranger. At the time, Taylor said it was one of the hardest storylines she had to film and the Independent Television Commission believed it should have carried a warning before it was broadcast. A few months later, Toyah became the show's first female character to be involved in a storyline surrounding the subject of under-age sex. The storyline was criticised by watchdogs, but Taylor defended it, calling it "educational".

Toyah began a relationship with Spider Nugent (Martin Hancock) in 1999, which lasted until Hancock's departure in July 2000. The following year, the character was the focus of one of Coronation Street's most controversial storylines, which saw her beaten and raped by Phil Simmonds (Jack Deam). The storyline marked the first time in 40 years that the show had included a rape. The storyline was criticised by some former Coronation Street cast members, who thought the producers were using the subject of rape to boost ratings. Taylor decided to leave the show in July 2002 and her character departed on-screen the following year on 5 February 2003. Toyah was well received by critics and Taylor received the Best Young Actor accolade at the Inside Soap Awards and Best Dramatic Performance at The British Soap Awards.

Following a thirteen-year absence from Coronation Street, Taylor announced that she had reprised the role in September 2016. She returned to filming the following month and Toyah's return scenes aired on 25 December 2016. Toyah's return storyline revolved around her decision to end her marriage to Toby Chapman (Andrew Dowbiggin) as she is having an affair with Peter Barlow (Chris Gascoyne) whom she later has a relationship with and the pair becoming landlords of The Rovers Return Inn. Storylines since have included her desire to have children resulting in trying to pass Eva Price's (Catherine Tyldesley) baby off as a result of IVF treatment and her relationship and later marriage to Imran Habeeb (Charlie De Melo), which ends in Toyah causing his death in a car accident. She was later arrested for his murder and found not guilty. In a later storyline in 2024, Toyah is diagnosed with ovarian cancer.

== Creation and casting ==
The four-strong Battersby family was created and introduced to Coronation Street in a bid to increase falling ratings. News of the family's arrival came days after the series producer, Brian Park, had axed three regular characters. He stated "The Battersbys are an exciting injection of fresh blood. They follow in the great tradition of the Ogdens and Duckworths, balancing the mix of comedy and drama for which Coronation Street is justly renowned." Actress and singer Toyah Willcox gave the producers permission to name the youngest member of the family after herself, since the character was born in 1982 at the height of her career. Willcox later regretted her decision.

Actress Georgia Taylor was cast as Toyah and the role marked her acting debut. Taylor was studying for her A-levels when she originally auditioned for the part of Zoe Tattersall. She was unsuccessful, so she then auditioned for Toyah and won the role. Of her casting, she explained "When I got the call to say that I'd got the part I just sat there open-mouthed, hugging my best friend. I could barely believe it. It is all very different than being on stage – it's not quite so intense because your audience isn't right there in front of you. But it's a very different type of satisfaction, working much faster with storylines and characters developing all the time." At the time of her casting, Taylor was two years older than the character she portrayed.

== Development ==
=== Characterisation ===
A month before she made her debut on-screen, Toyah was described as being Janice Battersby's (Vicky Entwistle) 14-year-old illegitimate daughter, who would become "the scourge of every Weatherfield Comprehensive teacher". During an interview with the Daily Record's Polly Graham, Taylor stated "Toyah's gobby and cocky and makes her parents' life a misery. But it's brilliant playing her, it's more fun than playing somebody nice." Graham explained that both Toyah and her stepsister, Leanne (Jane Danson) were well known to the police for under-age drinking and burglary. Taylor said that she hated her character's clothes, as they were too revealing for her. She explained "In the beginning, the clothes that Toyah wore were terrible. I was very conscious of my bum hanging out from these tiny mini-skirts. There are a lot of girls who wear those tarty skirts, but I never felt comfortable in that sort of thing." Taylor also disliked Toyah's make-up, which was initially bright pink lipstick, a lot of black eyeliner and no foundation.

Toyah's image eventually began to change and she became more aware of the way she looked when she got a boyfriend and started college. Toyah also took extra English lessons from Ken Barlow (William Roache) in a bid to better herself. Taylor later commented that her character got on her nerves due to her naivety. She also thought that Toyah had a romantic view of love, was too trusting and occasionally needed to be "a bit more clued up". The actress added that Toyah was "a very decent person", who was loyal to her friends. Digital Spy's Kris Green described Toyah as "the more mellow of the Battersbys" and thought that it was due to Les (Bruce Jones) not being her biological father. The Daily Mirror's Charlie Catchpole commented that Toyah went "from lumpy, sulky schoolgirl to confident, radiant young woman".

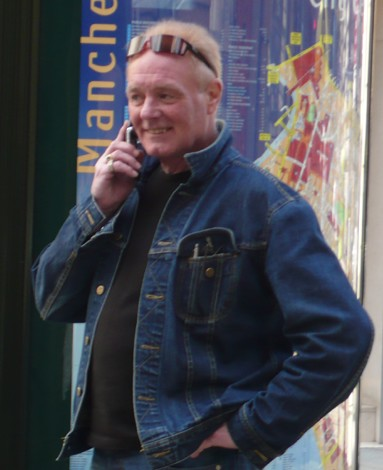
Bruce Jones played Toyah's stepfather Les.

=== Abduction ===
Following an argument with Janice and Les, Toyah runs away to London to find her real father, Ronnie. However, she was "led on" by Neil Flynn (Tim Dantay), a stranger pretending to be Ronnie, and was later abducted by him. Taylor said that the storyline was one of the hardest she had to film: "In the story, I come down to London to track down my real father and things go badly wrong. Toyah hitchhikes all the way and just leaves herself so wide open. She is so naive and trusting and open to being used and abused." The storyline was filmed on location in the city of London in early August. An hour long episode focusing on Janice and Les' search for Toyah was broadcast a month later.

Jones, who played Les, revealed that the runaway storyline was tough on him and he began crying when he read the scripts. He continued "The four of us in the Battersby family read our scripts together to work out how we are going to play our parts. On this occasion, all four of us were sobbing. It is not like a normal Coronation Street story, it's more like a Taggart or a Cracker." Jones thought the "scrapes" that Toyah found herself in were frightening and hoped that if the storyline could stop one teenager from running away from home, then it would be worthwhile. The storyline attracted the attention of the Independent Television Commission, who believed that the episode featuring Toyah's abduction should have carried a warning before it was broadcast.

=== Under-age sex ===
In October 1998, Toyah became the first female Coronation Street character to be involved in a storyline surrounding the subject of under-age sex. Toyah, who was sixteen at the time, had a holiday romance with Philip "Dobber" Dobson (John Donnelly). She quickly introduced him to her parents and was prepared to do anything for him, like stealing from the local café. When Dobber asked Toyah to have sex with him, she agreed, despite knowing that she should wait. Toyah was scared that if she said no, Dobber would break up with her. Toyah was persuaded to lose her virginity to Dobber in the back of his car. The storyline was branded "controversial" and "shocking", while watchdogs stated that it sent out the wrong ideas to young schoolgirls. Taylor defended the storyline and her character, saying "We have taken a strong moral line and are not promoting teenage sex. It's quite the opposite. Toyah's actions should be a lesson for other girls not to fall into the same trap. It was an educational storyline, and I feel it was done in a responsible way."

The actress went on to explain that the storyline showed how Toyah regretted her actions and that young female viewers could learn from her mistakes. She added "Anyone watching can see Dobber is just using Toyah and I hope the message gets across to other girls not to fall into the same trap." Toyah did not use protection with Dobber, so her sister, Leanne, persuaded her to go to the doctor for the morning-after pill. Taylor praised Leanne for being Toyah's "conscience and the voice of common sense". She thought that Leanne had given her good and responsible advice on how to deal with what happened. The Daily Record's John Millar agreed with Taylor and wrote that the storyline was "building to a stark warning for the millions of teenagers tuning into the Street." Millar believed at no time did the viewers get the impression that Toyah was doing something "admirable" and proclaimed that Toyah was "the sort of girl who needs care and affection, which explains why the poor soul was coaxed into losing her virginity after a holiday romance convinced her that she was in love."

=== Relationship with Spider Nugent ===
Five months after moving onto Coronation Street, Toyah developed a crush on her neighbour, Spider Nugent (Martin Hancock) and even turned vegetarian to try and impress him. Hancock told All About Soap's Hilary Kingsley that Spider initially saw Toyah as "a chubby schoolgirl, a pesky brat who had a crush on him." However, when she listened to his issues and helped him with his battles against the local supermarket and the council, Spider began to admire her instead. Hancock explained "She was so efficient and hard-working that she became a friend. And then, over the summer, it hit him, "Blimey! She's turned out nice!" While Spider and Toyah watched the 1999 solar eclipse together, they ended up having sex for the first time. Hancock observed that both Spider and Toyah were overcome by the excitement to the point that there was "an explosion of lust." However, in the morning, Spider was torn about what had happened. He admired Toyah, but knew that if they became a couple, it would cause a lot of problems, particularly as there was a ten-year age gap between them. Taylor explained that she was happy that her character was getting together with Spider, although their scenes together often took place in the "grottiest" of locations.

Spider decided to "dodge his responsibilities" and began staying away from Toyah, who was not happy about it as she wanted them to make a commitment. Spider eventually changed his mind and Hancock commented "The fact is that he really fancies Toyah and he figures that he may as well be hung for a sheep as a goat." The actor reckoned that Spider and Toyah brought out the best in each other. Spider and Toyah soon began a proper relationship and briefly lived together. However, when Spider announced that he wanted to settle down and buy a house with Toyah, the couple realised that they had started to drift apart. Spider thought that if they got a mortgage together, it would help save the relationship, but Toyah did not want that at all. When Spider was offered a promotion, he realised that he did not want to work for the DSS anymore and quit. He then told Toyah that he had bought them tickets to India so that they could go and "find themselves." However, Toyah insisted that she did not want to leave Weatherfield. Nicole Carmichael from Inside Soap wrote that while Spider did not want to lose Toyah, he felt that he could not stay and soon departed.

=== Rape ===
In April 2001, Toyah was the focus of one of Coronation Street's most controversial storylines. After enjoying a night out with her friend Sam Kingston (Scott Wright), Toyah is raped, beaten and left for dead in an alleyway by an unknown assailant as she walked home alone. The storyline began during a special 45-minute episode that was broadcast during the Easter weekend. Viewers saw Toyah being grabbed by her attacker, but not the actual act of rape. Instead Toyah is found by Jason Grimshaw (Ryan Thomas) just as he set out for an early morning run. Jason takes a "traumatised" Toyah back to her house, where she tells her mother what had happened. Toyah then has to repeat the story to the police and reveals that she does not know who raped her because she was semi-conscious during the attack. Toyah undergoes an examination and counselling at the local hospital. The scenes were shot at the St Mary's Hospital Sexual Assault Centre in Manchester, where the writers spent four months researching victims' experiences and working with the clinical director and the staff to get the scenario right.

The storyline was criticised by some former Coronation Street cast members who believed the producers were using the subject of rape to gain higher ratings than rival soap opera EastEnders. Taylor defended the storyline and hoped that it would help other women who had been attacked to seek help. She stated "The main focus of the storyline is the psychological effect that the attack has on Toyah. There are many women out there who have been raped or sexually assaulted and we owe it to them to make sure that the story-line is handled sensitively and accurately. There is no denying that rape is a sensitive and controversial storyline. But I have put my heart and soul into it trying to portray it accurately and I only hope that women who have experienced it will think I have given it justice." A show spokesperson commented that the storyline would be "handled sensitively" and that it would not become "a whodunnit". Some of the male residents came under suspicion and were forced to give DNA samples. Peter Barlow (Chris Gascoyne) briefly became the prime suspect, but DNA soon eliminated him from enquires.

Toyah was aware that her attacker knew her as she remembered him calling her name, but could not put a name to the voice. She also struggled to deal with her "physical and emotional scars" and soon developed agoraphobia. Toyah found support from her mother and neighbour Charlie Ramsden (Clare McGlinn), who revealed that she had once been raped. Taylor told Inside Soap's Allison Maund that Charlie's advice really helped Toyah to start getting back on her feet. However, the process was hampered when Toyah received an anonymous phone call, which left her feeling "extremely frightened". The phone call sparked "a terrifying event" in which Toyah's rapist was finally revealed to be her friend Phil Simmonds (Jack Deam). When Phil came round to comfort Toyah, she recognised his voice as he called out her name and realised that he was her rapist. While Toyah tried to escape, Phil grabbed her and held her hostage. Toyah's screams were heard by Peter, who broke the door down and knocked Phil unconscious. A show spokesperson commented that Toyah would be left to worry about whether Phil would deny the rape and be convicted.

A couple of months later, Toyah received a letter from Phil asking her to visit him in prison and, in return, he would plead guilty to raping her. Until the letter arrived, Toyah had been piecing her life back together by getting her job back at the Rovers and starting a romance with Sam. Of how Toyah felt about the letter, Taylor told Adrian Lobb from Inside Soap, "By the time Toyah gets the letter, she has grown a little stronger. But it comes as a complete surprise. Toyah doesn't trust Phil, obviously, and she thinks he's playing games. While part of her wants to confront him about the attack, there's another side of her that wants to let it go, and just leave it to the courts to deal with him." Toyah agreed to Phil's request to visit him and Taylor said that Toyah believed that seeing Phil in person would help her to come to terms with what happened. When Toyah came face to face with Phil, her first thought was how pathetic he looked. When Phil tried to make excuses for what he had done, Toyah did not feel any pity and told him to plead guilty, which he agreed to do. Toyah left the prison feeling "tearful, but triumphant" and Taylor commented that while she would never fully recover from her ordeal, Toyah was determined to look towards the future.

The storyline was revisited in 2024, as it emerges that Toyah became pregnant from the assault and gave birth to a stillborn baby, which she later buried in Red Rec park. It was initially reported that Toyah becomes concerned that the baby's remains will be found when an area of the Red Rec is marked for redevelopment, and she is later caught digging in the park. Stefania Sarrubba of Digital Spy stated "The news forces the character to confront the consequences of those traumatic events from two decades ago." The storyline received a negative response from fans when it was announced, with some pointing out how the original storyline, especially the aftermath of the rape, would not "be consistent with a pregnancy." Former cast member Vicky Entwistle, who played Toyah's mother, also reacted negatively to the new plot on social media. The "controversial" storyline was confirmed on 16 April, with scenes airing the following week. As Toyah searches for Roy Cropper's (David Neilson) dog in the park, she comes across three people digging up a rosebed as they believe Roy has buried Lauren Bolton's (Cait Fitton) body there. After causing a scene by smashing a car window with a spade, Toyah breaks down in tears and later remarks to Nick Tilsley (Ben Price) that the spot in the park is "a special place". She eventually reveals that she gave birth to a stillborn girl following her rape and buried the body in the park.

=== Departure ===
"I have had the most amazing time working on Coronation Street, but the time has come to move on and try my hand at other things. I have made some wonderful friends that I know I will have for life. I will be sad to leave but I am very excited about the future."

— Taylor on her decision to leave.

On 30 July 2002, Neil Wilkes from Digital Spy reported that Taylor had quit Coronation Street after five years. Wilkes revealed that her contract would expire in October that year, but the actress had chosen to stay with the serial beyond that to give the writers time to come up with a storyline for her character's departure. Series producer Kieran Roberts added that he was sorry to see Taylor go, but understood her decision to move on. Taylor later explained that she chose to leave because she and the writers struggled to come up with storylines for Toyah. She told the Liverpool Echo's Janet Tansley "I was asked where she would go from there and couldn't think what she could do. If I couldn't see a future for her, I couldn't play her." Taylor filmed her final scenes on 3 January 2003.

Despite a rumour that Toyah would become a victim of serial killer Richard Hillman (Brian Capron), the producers decided that she needed "a fiery fling" before she left. Therefore, Toyah's last storylines saw her embark on "a passionate affair" with her university tutor John Arnley (Paul Warriner). However, the relationship quickly turned into a love triangle when John had an affair with Toyah's flatmate Maria Connor (Samia Ghadie). When Toyah discovered the affair, she decided to leave the Street and made her on-screen exit in February 2003.

=== Reintroduction ===
On 20 September 2016, it was announced Taylor had agreed to reprise her role after an absence of 13 years. Taylor began filming her scenes in October 2016 and made her on-screen return in the episode broadcast on 25 December 2016. Toyah has often been mentioned and referred to by her family members since her departure. Taylor expressed her happiness at her return, saying "I am thrilled to be re-joining my old friends on the cobbles and hugely excited to be given the opportunity to explore the character of Toyah 13 years on. Coronation Street has always had a place in my heart and I'm delighted to be working again with my good friend Jane Danson and bringing the Battersby sisters back together." The actress also said that the upcoming storylines played a part in her return to the show. She described them as "fantastic, clever, and detailed". The show's series producer, Kate Oates, added that Toyah would have some secrets upon her return that she has kept from her sister, Leanne. The character's return storyline saw her showing up in Weatherfield after deciding to end her marriage to husband Toby (Andrew Dowbiggin), because she has been having an affair. Toby later follows Toyah to the Street, where he asks her to reconsider her decision and try for a baby. However, Toyah makes it clear that their marriage is finished and asks him to leave.

== Storylines ==
=== 1997–2003 ===
Toyah and her family move into 5 Coronation Street and soon upset the neighbours with their bad behaviour, most notably Curly Watts (Kevin Kennedy). Toyah and her stepsister, Leanne (Jane Danson), steal from the local newsagent and indulge in under-age drinking. Toyah develops a crush on Spider Nugent (Martin Hancock) and turns vegetarian to impress him. She also asks him to help save a turkey from being slaughtered for Christmas. After arguing with her mother, Janice (Vicky Entwistle), and stepfather, Les (Bruce Jones), Toyah runs away to London to find her biological father, Ronnie Clegg (Dean Williamson). However, Toyah comes across Neil Flynn (Tim Dantay), who pretends to be her father and then abducts her. Neil takes Toyah to some woods, but while he is distracted, she escapes and is found by Janice and Les.

Toyah gets a job at Roy's Rolls, the local café, and begins dating Philip "Dobber" Dobson (John Donnelly). Dobber is a bad influence on Toyah, persuading her to steal from the café and threatening to dump her if she did not have sex with him. Toyah loses her virginity to Dobber but eventually sees through him and they break up. With the help of a former teacher, Ken Barlow (William Roache), Toyah's grades at school soon improve and she even wins a writing competition. While spending the night watching a lunar eclipse together, Toyah and Spider have sex. They soon begin a relationship and stay at Emily Bishop's (Eileen Derbyshire) house for a while until they find a place of their own. Toyah gets a second job as a barmaid at The Rovers Return and start to drift apart so when Spider asks her to go to India with him, she turns him down. Spider leaves Weatherfield alone. Toyah later has a one-night stand with Andy McDonald (Nicholas Cochrane).

After a night out with Sam Kingston (Scott Wright), Toyah decides to walk home alone, but is attacked and raped. Toyah is found by Jason Grimshaw (Ryan Thomas), who takes her home. Janice initially thinks Toyah has been robbed and is shocked when Toyah tells her she was raped. Toyah gives a statement to the police and is examined at the hospital. Several male residents are suspected, particularly Peter Barlow (Chris Gascoyne), but they are ruled out by DNA tests. Toyah struggles to deal with what has happened to her and she develops agoraphobia. While being comforted at home by her friend, Phil Simmonds (Jack Deam), Toyah recognises his voice as he calls out her name and realises that he had raped her. Phil realises that she knows and stops her from escaping. Peter hears Toyah's screams and rescues her after knocking Phil unconscious. Phil is found guilty of rape and sent to prison. Toyah has a brief romance with Sam and moves into a flat with Fiz Brown (Jennie McAlpine) and Maria Sutherland (Samia Ghadie).

While on holiday in Blackpool, Toyah meets Goran Milanovic (Matt Zarb), an illegal immigrant. After a few dates, he proposes marriage, but she refuses before starting to date her college tutor, John Arnley (Paul Warriner). She is initially reluctant to introduce him to her flatmates and when she does, they are surprised to see that he is a lot older. John asks Toyah to move in with him and she agrees. When Toyah and Fiz argue about John, Fiz tells her that he and Maria had sex and Maria got pregnant. Toyah confronts Maria, who gives her the impression that John raped her. Remembering her rape, Toyah attacks John in front of his class before dumping him. Toyah decides to leave Weatherfield after reuniting with Spider and they move to London.

=== 2016–present ===
Toyah returns on Christmas Day, telling Leanne that she has left her husband Toby Chapman (Andrew Dowbiggin), as she has been having an affair. Toyah later meets Peter Barlow, her new partner, and they agree to tell Leanne that they are together. Toby visits Toyah to try and save their marriage but she refuses to listen or reconcile. Toyah then goes with Leanne to the hospital after she has a migraine. Toyah and Peter decide to keep their relationship a secret, but Peter's son, Simon Barlow (Alex Bain), sees them kiss using his drone. Peter tells Toyah that Simon knows and they ask him to keep it a secret for Leanne's sake.

Toyah argues with Leanne's half-sister, Eva Price (Catherine Tyldesley), for not passing on a message about starting a shift at the pub, but they agree to call a truce. Peter leaves cigarettes at Leanne's flat and Toyah tries to take the blame, but Simon is forced to cover for her. He later tells Eva who blackmails Toyah: stop Peter from shutting down Aidan Connor's (Shayne Ward) factory or Eva will tell Leanne about Peter and Toyah. Peter agrees to Eva's demands and they continue their affair. Toby returns in January 2017 and demands Toyah sign a paper to destroy their frozen embryos. Toyah is reluctant and after a heart to heart, they kiss. However, Toyah makes it clear that she does not love Toby and is staying with Peter, causing Toby to lash out and leave. Peter learns what has happened and decides to drop off Chloe Tipton (Jo-Anne Knowles), making Toyah jealous. They later make up and Leanne catches Peter and Toyah kissing. During a heated argument, Leanne disowns Toyah and refuses to talk to her again, despite her efforts. Leanne forgives Toyah after she helps deliver baby Oliver in a lift after it breaks down.

Peter buys The Rovers Return from Steve (Simon Gregson) and Liz McDonald (Beverley Callard). After another round of IVF fails, Toyah is told that future treatment is not recommended as problems with her uterus mean that she is very unlikely to ever get pregnant. She and Peter look into surrogacy after talking to Izzy Armstrong (Cherylee Houston). The couple are accepted as clients by a surrogacy agency and Jacqui, a surrogate mother, agrees to carry their baby after meeting them. She strikes up a feud with Peter's ex-wife, Carla Connor (Alison King), upon her return to Weatherfield. Toyah is later devastated when Jacqui miscarries the baby and she is shocked to discover that Eva is pregnant with her ex-fiancé Aidan's baby. Toyah supports Eva's decision to have an abortion. However, Toyah concocts a plan shortly before the termination where Eva would give birth to her baby and pretend the baby is Toyah and Peter's through Jackie. Eva gives birth to her baby girl who she Toyah and Peter name Susie as they go through with the plan of pretending Eva's daughter is theirs, with Peter none the wiser. Peter later finds out and breaks up with Toyah selling the pub. Eva leaves the street with Susie meaning that Toyah no longer has a child. She starts to move on with her life and gets a job at the medical centre and has a fling with Imran Habeeb (Charlie de Melo) unaware Leanne is also having a fling with him. When they find out, they hatch a plan and pretend they want a threesome with him but the plan backfires when he realises what they are up to. Toyah begins a relationship with Imran and they later foster children together including Kelly Neelan (Millie Gibson) and become embroiled in her murder charge for her role in Seb Franklin’s (Harry Visioni) death.

In October 2021, unbeknownst to Toyah, Imran has a one-night stand with Seb's mother Abi (Sally Carman), resulting in Abi getting pregnant and, in 2022, giving birth to their son, Alfie Franklin. Toyah finds out about Imran’s paternity to Alfie and after marrying him to gain custody they get custody of baby Alfie, which included Imran lying and stitching Abi up by hiring colleague Ben Chancellor (Jon-Paul Bell) to take pictures of her supposedly doing a drug deal for evidence in the custody battle, however this turns out to be Abi paying off an old friend Dean (Anthony Crank) to stay away from her. (Dean had caused trouble for Abi earlier in the year). In June 2022, Imran and Toyah caught on to the fact that Abi is planning to flee abroad with Baby Alfie. Toyah considers going to the police. Imran's guilty conscience took hold as he eventually persuaded Toyah against getting the police involved and he tells her the truth about him framing Abi as a drug addict. The pair were on their way home when a crash occurred with them in the car. Imran later dies of a cardiac arrest caused by the crash and Toyah survives, but ends up in hospital. It later emerges Toyah caused the crash on purpose and she is arrested and charged with careless driving.

In July 2023, Toyah is kidnapped.

In April 2024, Toyah reveals that in 2001, she gave birth to a premature baby girl after being raped, but the child was tragically stillborn. She tells Nick Tilsley that the father of her baby girl was her rapist, Phil Simmonds. She buried her daughter in a park that is dug up in the search for missing teenager Lauren Bolton (Cait Fitton).

== Reception ==
In 1998, Taylor earned the "Best Young Actor" accolade at the Inside Soap Awards. In 2001, Taylor won "Best Dramatic Performance" at The British Soap Awards. She was also nominated for "Most Popular Actress" at the 7th National Television Awards. At the Inside Soap Awards, Taylor earned a ""Best Actress" nomination, while Toyah's rape was nominated in the "Most Dramatic Storyline" category. In July 2018, Taylor was longlisted for the "Best Actress" award at the Inside Soap Awards. She did not progress to the viewer-voted shortlist. For her portrayal of Toyah, Taylor was nominated for Best Soap Actor (Female) at the 2018 Digital Spy Reader Awards; she came in eleventh place with 1.5% of the total votes. Taylor was also longlisted for "Best Actress" at the 2024 Inside Soap Awards for her role as Toyah.

The People's Gavin Blyth and Jon Clarke stated that Toyah and Leanne were "rough, tough and make other streetwise teenagers look like they are fresh out of nursery." The characters were credited with increasing the show's ratings from 13 million to 19 million viewers. When Toyah met Dobber, the Daily Mirror's Tony Purnell commented "If anyone was going to find Mr Wrong on holiday it was Toyah Battersby." John Millar from the Daily Record wrote "The Street should be congratulated if the plight of Toyah Battersby – a brilliant performance by young Georgia Taylor, by the way – means just one schoolgirl says no to her lusting boyfriend."

An Inside Soap columnist observed that during the controversy over whether the show was right to run a storyline about rape, Taylor's "magnificent" portrayal of a rape victim seemed to have been forgotten. The Daily Mirror's Tony Stewart also praised Taylor's performance throughout the storyline, saying it was "so heart-achingly convincing". Stewart also wrote that Toyah's attack was "a chilling reminder of how brutal life can be". Stewart's colleague, Sue Crawford, branded Toyah a "disaster magnet". In June 2011, Rachel Tarley from the Metro included Toyah's rape in her list of the top 10 most controversial soap storylines.

Lorna Cooper, editor for MSN TV, included Toyah in a feature about soap's forgotten characters. Cooper said Toyah "didn't have the best of luck during her 1997–2003 stint on Coronation Street." A writer for Virgin Media quipped "Wayward teen Toyah rampaged through The Street in the 1990s. She fell for eco-warrior Spider but her life fell apart after she was raped by evil Phil Simmonds. She then followed Spider to London." In November 2012, Paul Millar from Digital Spy stated "Toyah Battersby was one of Coronation Street's best-loved characters – certainly the best-loved Battersby – during the time in which she graced the cobbles."

Laura-Jayne Tyler of Inside Soap praised Toyah's return, stating "We're loving every single second of Toyah being back, and actress Georgia Taylor is rocking her return like she's never been away. Having said that, we're not sure that she's fully embracing Toyah's steamy snogging sessions with Peter Barlow. If it were us, we'd be getting properly stuck in!" In September 2017, Katie Fitzpatrick of the Manchester Evening News noted how viewers found Toyah's middle name, Laverne, "hilarious" when it was revealed on-screen.
