= Janice Battersby =

Fictional character from Coronation Street

- Coronation Street character
- Portrayed by: Vicky Entwistle
- Duration: 1997–2011
- First appearance: Episode 4121; 6 January 1997
- Last appearance: Episode 7564; 25 March 2011
- Introduced by: Brian Park
- Spin-off appearances: Coronation Street: Through the Keyhole (1999)
In-universe information
- Other names: Janice Lee
- Occupation: Machinist (until 2011)
- Father: Rod Lee
- Mother: Dottie Lee
- Sisters: Janet Lee
- Husband: Les Battersby (until 2004)
- Daughters: Toyah Battersby
- Stepdaughters: Leanne Battersby
- Granddaughters: Rose Battersby

Janice Battersby (also Lee) is a fictional character from the British ITV soap opera Coronation Street. Played by Vicky Entwistle, the character first appeared on-screen during the episode airing on 6 January 1997.

On 2 August 2010, it was announced that Entwistle had quit her role as Janice after 14 years on the show and would depart in 2011. She made her final appearance on 25 March 2011 after she leaves Weatherfield with her new boyfriend Trevor Dean (Steve Jackson) to go to London. As of 2016, she was mentioned as living in Liverpool.

== Creation ==
=== Background ===
The mid-1990s were a time of big change behind-the-scenes at Coronation Street. The long-running serial was being regularly beaten in the ratings by rival soap EastEnders. A new producer, Brian Park, was brought in to revitalise the soap in 1997. Dubbed "the axeman", Park was responsible for culling 8 long-running and established characters, as well as giving the go-ahead for more controversial and sensationalist storylines, aimed at attracting a younger audience. He also introduced various new characters, among them were the Battersby family. Dubbed the "family from hell", the Battersbys were Janice and her husband Les, living with him and his daughter Leanne and a daughter of her own, Toyah, who was the result of a short-lived relationship Janice had with Ronnie Clegg (Dean Wiliamson) when she was 16. Although not above occasional law-breaking, Janice was nowhere near as anti-social as Les.

=== Casting ===
Auditions were held for the part of Janice Battersby, with actress Vicky Entwistle going on to secure the role. In 2005, the character of Janice was axed by producer Tony Wood, along with characters Sunita Alahan (Shobna Gulati) and Jessie Jackson (Nailah Cumberbatch). However, a few weeks after the axing, a last-minute decision was made, and the character was given a reprieve by the newly drafted producer Steve Frost. Of this decision, the soap's spokesperson said: "The new producer has talked to Vicky Entwistle and asked if she would like to stay with the programme. Janice is a very popular character, but ultimately it was the producer's own decision to keep her on, prompted by the great new storylines the character can play out."

=== Characterisation ===
Janice is a larger than life character who is not afraid of confrontation with other people. ITV publicity describes the character, along with her former husband Les, as 'Weatherfield's answer to Wayne and Waynetta Slob' (two characters from Harry Enfield & Chums), but did stress that her character has shown her softer side in certain storylines, such as Toyah's rape, and proved she does have morals when she tried to stop Leanne's prostititution. Her manager at Underworld from 2004 to 2006, Danny Baldwin (Bradley Walsh), had his own nickname for her, "Lippy", because of her loud mouth and answering back. An insider spokesperson for Coronation Street said of Janice's character in 2005 that: "She is well loved for being such a feisty character who can get quite nasty at times."

== Storylines ==
Janice first appears in January 1997 as a new machinist at Mike Baldwin's (Johnny Briggs) garment factory Underworld. In July 1997 she returns along with husband Les (Bruce Jones), daughter Toyah (Georgia Taylor) and stepdaughter Leanne (Jane Danson). She is consistently rude to her various managers at the factory. She breaks up with Les after having an affair with Dennis Stringer (Charles Dale) late in 2001, who is seeing Eileen Grimshaw (Sue Cleaver) at the time. Les is so upset that he attempts suicide on New Year's Day, and while driving him to hospital, they collide with another car. Les survives with minor injuries but Dennis is badly injured and later dies in hospital. Janice is left devastated by Dennis's death as Janice wrongfully blames him for Dennis's death.

Janice later becomes involves with police officer, Mick Hopwood. When Mick and Les get into a fight, Les is unfairly imprisoned and Janice splits up with Mick. A later attempt at reconciliation with Les fails as a result of interference from Cilla Brown (Wendi Peters).

In March 2004, Janice sneaks into the storeroom at the factory for a crafty cigarette but drops the cigarette when cleaner Harry Flagg (Iain Rogerson) locks her in, a fire starts. Just before the whole room burns down, factory manager Nick Tilsley (Adam Rickitt) comes to her rescue – and as a result of the fire, she ends up in hospital and Nick is sacked by Mike.

In the summer of 2005, Janice discovers, to her horror, that she has nits. Drunkenly, she asks friend Sean Tully (Antony Cotton) to shave her head. When she sees her bald head in the mirror, she is appalled. A couple of weeks later, she has a mud fight with resident Claire Peacock (Julia Haworth) on the Red Rec after Claire calls her a "pug faced scumbag".

In early 2006, Janice and Leanne are involved in a car accident, when Danny (Bradley Walsh) does not ask Kevin Webster (Michael Le Vell) to perform a full service on the car. They crash into Gail Platt's (Helen Worth) front wall. Since then, Janice and Sally Webster become rivals as Janice feels that Sally and her daughter, Rosie, look down their noses at her. The rivalry comes to a head on 27 February 2006, when Janice is sacked by Danny Baldwin, and shortly after, she is punched by nemesis Sally, in the middle of the Rovers Return Inn. She leaves the Street in shame. She goes to stay with Toyah in London in March 2006, but returns by April, telling Leanne that life in London was not any better than life in Weatherfield. She then helps Leanne, as she discovers Mike's original will, which Leanne's boyfriend Danny does not know about.

In January 2007, Janice's heating breaks down and she calls plumber Roger Stiles (Andrew Dunn) to fix it, who arrives late. After socialising a bit, Roger asks Janice to go with him to France for a few months, which she accepts. She returns in March and Roger returns in June. She subsequently finds out that her stepdaughter Leanne is a prostitute; after everyone finds out, Janice gets into a catfight with co-worker Kelly Crabtree (Tupele Dorgu). Janice pleads with her to give up her work, but Leanne initially refuses as it is too lucrative. Eventually she admits that she cannot continue and moves in with Janice. Janice and Roger reconcile, and Roger gives Leanne a loan for the restaurant she plans to open, but his lack of money means he struggles to pay his rent, so he moves in with Janice. Leanne's restaurant burns down in April 2008. A few weeks later, Paul tells the police he and Leanne set the place on fire for insurance money. Janice is furious with Leanne for lying to her.

In September 2008, Janice and Leanne discover that one of the Lottery syndicate tickets for Underworld is a winner, to the tune of almost £25,000. Spotting an opportunity, Leanne persuades Janice that they should keep the money and claim the winnings by setting up a bogus bank account in Rosie Webster's (Helen Flanagan) name. However, Rosie has vanished, worrying her parents and when they learn of the lottery win, the police stop looking for Rosie, believing that she has absconded with the cash. Unable to live with her guilty conscience, Janice eventually comes clean on 8 October 2008 and is arrested while at work in the factory. The factory girls also tell Roger about the scam and he leaves Janice, disgusted at her behaviour. Janice is left on the Street in tears as Roger drives away. Leanne sees her from her upstairs window and callously just shuts the blind. In November, Janice stands trial for the scam alone, having agreed to keep Leanne's name out of it and is sentenced to community service, much to the disgust of her colleagues. She starts her work placement at the canteen at Weatherfield General Hospital in December and is initially delighted to discover that her supervisor is Emily Bishop (Eileen Derbyshire), whom she sees as a pushover. However, she is proven wrong as Emily is very strict. On 29 December, she goes for a cigarette outside the hospital and meets Mike Scott (Anthony Bessick). He tells her he is in for a chest infection, downgraded from pneumonia. She tells him about her community service, and they laugh over their shared misfortune. Janice then goes back to work, but that night her friends tell her that she has been beaming the whole time she has been out with them, which suggests that she still has Mike on her mind.

Mike reappears on 30 January 2009, when he and Janice chat. However, he keels over and collapses. Janice gets help for Mike but later discovers that he has died, following an operation one week before. Mike's wife, Laura, is grateful that Janice was with him when he died. After this, Janice decides that she wants to become a nurse, despite ridicule from her friends, but her new boss, Luke Strong (Craig Kelly), sends her on a first-aid course in March 2009 and makes her the factory first-aider. Janice's skills come in useful when Joshua Peacock (Benjamin Beresford) collapses after swallowing a bee at the Street's summer fete. He is later rushed to hospital and recovers. Janice later tells Kelly that she does not want to be a nurse any more from the horror that Joshua could have died.

In January 2010, Trevor Dean (Steve Jackson), a local dustman, provokes Janice by refusing to empty her rubbish bin. In protest, she jumps onto the side of his bin lorry and holds on as he drives down the street. Later, the pair become friends, and after telling Trevor she is looking for a lodger, he agrees to move in with her. Janice is very attracted to him but he starts dating her boss, Carla Connor (Alison King). Janice is disappointed when Trevor later leaves Weatherfield after breaking up with Carla.

On 6 December 2010, a tram crashes onto the cobbles, following an explosion at The Joinery bar. Janice puts her first aid training to use, helping the injured in the Rovers. She also witnesses stepdaughter Leanne's wedding to Peter Barlow (Chris Gascoyne), which takes place in hospital as he was injured in the disaster.

In January 2011, Janice meets a man called Gaz at a singles night in the Rovers who invites her to go on holiday with him. However, she is too drunk to board the flight and returns later that evening. At this time, Chris Gray (Will Thorp) has paid an associate to rob Janice's flat, hoping to cause trouble for Streetcars; he is disturbed by her entry and runs off but knocks Janice to the ground and is left shaken. In the weeks following the burglary, Janice becomes very nervous of living alone and eventually gives up her flat, moving in with workmate Julie Carp (Katy Cavanagh). In March 2011, with Underworld struggling to remain afloat, Janice says the wrong thing once too often, when she tries to convince her co-workers to go on strike, and Carla sacks her. Janice is pleasantly surprised when she bumps into Trevor again. He tells her that he is only staying briefly as he is leaving to go on a world trip and suggests Janice go with him, a few days later. Now unemployed and with Leanne happily married to Peter, she agrees. After saying goodbye to Leanne, Janice's co-worker Izzy Armstrong (Cherylee Houston) spots her and tells the locals so they go outside to wave her off. Janice spots them coming out of the Rovers, so they drive into a puddle soaking all her friends and she shouts "Losers" as she drives off into the distance with Trevor.

In July 2011, Leanne receives a phonecall from Janice to wish her happy birthday and tell her that she is currently working at a hotel in France. On this day, Leanne finds out that newcomer Stella Price (Michelle Collins) is her biological mother but decides not to tell Janice because she viewed her as more of a mother to her than Stella ever was. In 2016, Janice is living in Liverpool and has split up with Trevor by this point.

== In popular culture ==
Janice's recognisable appearance and loud mouthed tendencies led to her being spoofed on the ITV TV comedy series 2DTV.
