= Coronation Street Live =

Coronation Street Live may refer to:

- "Coronation Street Live" (2000 episode), live episode of Coronation Street broadcast on 8 December 2000
- "Coronation Street Live" (2010 episode), live episode of Coronation Street broadcast on 9 December 2010
- "Coronation Street Live" (2015 episode), live episode of Coronation Street broadcast on 23 September 2015

See also

- Episode 1 (Coronation Street), the series' first episode, also broadcast live, on 9 December 1960
