= List of Coronation Street characters introduced in 2000 =

The following is a list of characters that first appeared in the ITV soap opera Coronation Street in 2000, by order of first appearance.

== Debs Brownlow ==
Debs Brownlow
- Coronation Street character
- Portrayed by: Gabrielle Glaister
- First appearance: 6 February 2000
- Last appearance: 10 November 2000
- Introduced by: Jane MacNaught
In-universe information
- Occupation: Hairdresser
- Sisters: Natalie Barnes
- Nephews: Tony Horrocks
- Nieces: Lorraine Brownlow; Laura Barnes
- First cousins: Helen

Debs Brownlow is the hairdresser sister of Natalie Barnes (Denise Welch) who first appears in The Rovers Return after working on a cruise ship for a number of years. She soon begins a relationship with resident Duggie Ferguson (John Bowe), despite his hesitation due to the memory of his dead wife Laura. Debs supports Natalie when the body of her murdered son Tony Horrocks (Lee Warburton) is discovered, and subsequently in August 2000 when gangster Jez Quigley (Lee Boardman) stands trial for the killing. Debs soon tires of Duggie's reluctance to have sex with her and has a one-night stand with Dev Alahan (Jimmi Harkishin) in April 2000.

Debs reunites with Duggie and they consummate their union. In October 2000, Duggie moves into No. 6 with her but she soon tires of him prioritising work over her and she orders him out. When Debs shares her relationship woes with Natalie's boyfriend Vinny Sorrell (James Gaddas) over a bottle of wine they sleep together. Duggie catches them in the act and tells a devastated Natalie. She throws Debs out of No. 6 and she subsequently leaves Weatherfield with new lover Vinny, returning to her old work on the cruise ship.

== Dennis Stringer ==
Dennis Stringer
- Coronation Street character
- Portrayed by: Charles Dale
- Duration: 2000–2002
- First appearance: 7 February 2000
- Last appearance: 2 January 2002
- Introduced by: Jane MacNaught
In-universe information
- Occupation: Mechanic
- Wife: Carol Stringer
- Aunts: Joan Lawson

Dennis Stringer was played by Charles Dale. Dennis is introduced in February 2000 and develops from a biker close friend of Les Battersby (Bruce Jones) into the partner of Eileen Grimshaw (Sue Cleaver) later in 2000.

In late 2001 Dennis and Janice Battersby (Vicky Entwistle) form an affair and leave their respective partners to live together. Following this, Les attempts suicide by getting drunk and gassing himself in his car on 1 January (New Year's Day) 2002. Dennis tracks him down and prevents the suicide, but while driving Les to hospital, crashes head on into another car. Les suffers minor injuries but Dennis is badly injured and dies in hospital shortly afterwards. Janice's daughter Toyah (Georgia Taylor) and Les both give readings at his funeral.

== Geena Gregory ==
Geena Gregory
- Coronation Street character
- Portrayed by: Jennifer James
- Duration: 2000–2002
- First appearance: 9 February 2000
- Last appearance: 11 October 2002
- Introduced by: Jane MacNaught
In-universe information
- Father: Maurice Gregory
- Mother: Jill Gregory

Geena Gregory is played by Jennifer James. Suranne Jones, who would later be cast as Karen McDonald, also auditioned for the role, though had a suspicion she would lose to James after seeing her at the audition.

Geena arrives when friend Vinny Sorrell (James Gaddas) needs help in the Rovers Return. She is well qualified for the job and her good looks and cheeky banter make her popular with the customers. She is made maid of honour at friend Linda Sykes' (Jacqueline Pirie) wedding to Mike Baldwin (Johnny Briggs), and although she knows about her affair with Mike's son Mark Redman (Paul Fox), Geena remained loyal to Linda and said nothing.

Geena has a complicated love life. Dev Alahan (Jimmi Harkishin) proposes to her but her mother, Gill, is determined to put a stop to it and set him up with Karen. Her plan fails, but Geena breaks off their engagement when she discovers he cheated on her with his employee Deirdre Rachid (Anne Kirkbride). She is soon seduced by handsome former prison convict, Joe Carter (Jonathan Wrather), and the two enjoy a fun relationship until a jealous Dev goads Joe into beating him up. Joe is scared of going back to prison and admits he loves Geena. By this time, she has completely fallen in love with him and agrees to talk to Dev. Dev tells Joe that if he is to end his relationship with Geena publicly, he would drop the assault charges against him. Joe does so and Geena is left shattered and humiliated by two men who claimed to love her. She flees the street after saying her goodbyes to her friend, Shelley Unwin (Sally Lindsay).

== Marion Stowe ==
Marion Stowe
- Coronation Street character
- Portrayed by: Paula Simms
- Duration: 2000–2001, 2003
- First appearance: 19 March 2000
- Last appearance: 7 September 2003
- Introduced by: Jane MacNaught
In-universe information
- Spouse: Bill Stowe
- Daughters: Candice Stowe

Marion Stowe, portrayed by Paula Simms, is the mother of Candice Stowe (Nikki Sanderson), who usually led her best mate Sarah-Louise Platt (Tina O'Brien) astray. Oblivious to Candice's bad behavior, Marion disapproved of Sarah, especially when she discovered the young girl was expecting a baby at the age of just thirteen. She demanded Sarah to stay away from her daughter, causing Sarah's mother Gail (Helen Worth) to angrily turn up on her doorstep and give her a piece of her mind before the door was slammed in her face.

Five months later, Marion gate crashed Sarah's daughter Bethany's (Amy and Emily Walton) christening party as she was furious with her daughter for going to such a "charade" when she had forbidden her to go. She insulted the party guests, Sarah, and vicar Jessica Lundy (Olwen May), who also gave her a piece of her mind. She physically dragged Candice from the house, and had a row with Gail and Sarah's adoptive father Martin Platt (Sean Wilson) outside the front yard. Almost a year later, Marion turned up at the Platt house again and dragged Candice away as she didn't want her to go on a camping trip with the family, afraid that her daughter might also end up pregnant as Candice's then boyfriend Todd Grimshaw (Bruno Langley) was also tagging along.

In the winter of 2001, Candice's troublecausing was finally revealed when Gail found expensive shopping in Sarah's bedroom, and Sarah told her the items belonged to Candice. Candice tried to put the blame on Sarah until Sarah revealed that Candice had gotten an evening job in a factory, which is how she got the clothes in the first place, and that Candice had convinced Sarah into letting her copy her homework. Marion finally realized the extent of her daughter's bad behavior, and angrily had a row with her and dragged her out of the Platt house.

In late August 2003, Marion showed selfishness when she began dating Gerry Burton (Mark Chatterton), and didn't believe her daughter's claims that Gerry was sexually harassing her. This caused Candice to sleep in the flat above Audrey Roberts' (Sue Nicholls) hair salon, and Audrey took pity on her when she discovered the girl's problems. Marion tried to get her daughter to come home, but when Candice refused, it was very clear that Marion would choose her boyfriend over her daughter when she gave Candice a bag of her belongings. Audrey sent Marion away with a flea in her ear, and Candice and her mother never made up since then.

Whenever Candice would mention her mother, it was very clear she used to have a good relationship with her. However, Marion would always give Sarah negative comments, such as telling her it was "bad luck" to buy things before the baby was born, and also making Sarah emotionally offended when Candice mentioned to Sarah she wasn't allowed to bring boys up to her bedroom any more.

Marion was referred to as just "Mrs. Stowe" in end credits, but on her last appearance, her full name was credited.

== Bobbi Lewis ==
Bobbi Lewis
- Coronation Street character
- Portrayed by: Naomi Ryan
- Duration: 2000–2002
- First appearance: 20 March 2000
- Last appearance: 5 April 2002
- Introduced by: Jane Macnaught

Bobbi Lewis was played by Naomi Ryan. She is employed as a machinist at Mike Baldwin's (Johnny Briggs) Underworld factory. In 2002 the character was axed by producer Kieran Roberts as part of a drive to revitalise the show, as it was being regularly beaten in the ratings by rival soap EastEnders at the time.

Bobbi starts work at Underworld in March 2000 when she takes over Linda Sykes' (Jacqueline Pirie) machine. She has an initially turbulent start when Linda sacks her for producing substandard work but is soon reinstated by Mike. She moves to the Street when she rents the salon flat with barmaid Geena Gregory (Jennifer James).

In October 2000, Bobbi is furious to discover that sales rep Harvey Reuban (Andrew Scarborough) has been dating her and Karen McDonald (Suranne Jones) at the same time. When the two women confront Harvey he smugly shrugs them both off. After they discover that he has a fiancée, they are determined to get revenge. A shameless Harvey turns on the charm to Bobbi, promising her he thinks she's special, also doing the same with Karen. They both play along but know the score. With the help of the other Underworld girls they organise a farewell party for him, where they get Harvey drunk and phone Saskia (Nikki Landowski), his fiancée, to pick him up. They graffiti his car, pour baked beans over him, sew the words "Slime Ball" on to the back of his suit jacket and tell his fiancée all about his womanising.

Karen and boyfriend Vikram Desai (Chris Bisson) set Bobbi up on a date with Steve McDonald (Simon Gregson), but it does not lead to anything further. After Karen and Vikram break up, Bobbi starts going out with Vikram in March 2001. After playing hard to get for a couple of months, Bobbi eventually sleeps with Vikram and they begin a serious relationship. In early 2002, Vikram cheats on Bobbi with Hazel Wilding (Kazia Pelka). Having fallen in love with Hazel, Vikram soon dumps Bobbi but she takes revenge by filing a false complaint against Vikram's taxi business, StreetCars for sexual harassment. With the business facing possible closure, and with employees' livelihoods on the line, Bobbi realises that her scheme has backfired. She subsequently withdraws her allegations and leaves Weatherfield in shame.

== Emma Taylor ==
Emma Taylor
- Coronation Street character
- Portrayed by: Angela Lonsdale
- Duration: 2000–2003
- First appearance: 10 April 2000
- Last appearance: 1 September 2003
- Introduced by: Jane MacNaught
In-universe information
- Occupation: Police Officer
- Husband: Curly Watts (2000–2003)
- Sons: Ben Watts
- Stepdaughters: Alice Watts (2000–2003)

Emma Taylor (formerly Watts) is played by Angela Lonsdale, and first appears on 10 April 2000. At the beginning she is credited as Sgt Emma Taylor. She is a police officer who helps solve the case when corrupt DC Simon Cavanagh is stalking Colette Graham and Curly Watts (Kevin Kennedy).

On 12 October 2000, the police, including Emma, surround the Freshco's supermarket as a siege develops inside. When they eventually burst in, Emma shoots the main gunman, Dean Sykes (Ciarán Griffiths)—who dies in an ambulance on the way to hospital. Due to her licence to kill, a trial is not undertaken. Dean had in fact fired a shot and Emma had responded.

Curly takes her out for a night on the beach and later asks her out to dinner. Curly proposes to Emma on a bateau mouche in Paris and they marry on 24 December (Christmas Eve) 2000. Their honeymoon to New York is delayed because Curly's daughter, Alice, cannot return to his ex-wife Raquel (Sarah Lancashire) when planned. Emma becomes pregnant shortly after their marriage and gives birth to their son Ben on 26 December (Boxing Day) 2001.

Emma later gets involved in a feud between one of her colleagues, Mick Hopwood (Ian Gain), and Les Battersby (Bruce Jones). Mick had been dating Les's wife Janice (Vicky Entwistle). Les is very jealous and they spend a lot of time winding each other up. Things escalate one night when Mick and Emma stop Les in his taxi on a minor traffic offence and after Les insults Mick, Mick beats him quite savagely but Emma promises to back Mick up even though Les did not really deserve the attack. When Curly finds out, this causes a lot of tension and the couple split up temporarily. Emma feels very guilty and plans to confess the truth to her superiors but at the last minute decides to back Mick up. She commits perjury at Les's trial for assaulting Mick and Les was wrongfully imprisoned for three months.

Near the end of Les's wrongful incarceration, Emma is put forward for promotion to Inspector in Newcastle. This would involve moving house and Curly is afraid he'd never see Ben. He swallows his principles and, in order to reconcile and be able to live in peace, they put Number 7 on the market and move to Newcastle upon Tyne.

In the 2010 spin-off DVD special Coronation Street – A Knight's Tale, Curly reveals that his marriage to Emma has ended since their departure from Weatherfield.

== Judith Roberts ==
Judith Roberts
- Coronation Street character
- Portrayed by: Jane Hogarth
- Duration: 2000, 2016, 2018, 2022, 2024
- First appearance: 3 May 2000
- Last appearance: 2 August 2024
- Introduced by: Jane MacNaught
In-universe information
- Occupation: Midwife

Judith Roberts, portrayed by Jane Hogarth, was Sarah-Louise Platt's (Tina O'Brien) midwife during her pregnancy with Bethany (Amy and Emily Walton). She was present at her antenatal class when Jenny Lyons (Natalie Lawless) asked her if her mother can be at the birth of her son, Josh (Adam Chapman). Judith said it was a fine idea and gave Sarah's mother Gail (Helen Worth) advice on how to be a grandmother.

In March 2016, Judith reappeared as Sarah's midwife when Sarah was pregnant with her son, Harry Platt. She checked in at the hospital with her sister in law Kylie (Paula Lane), afraid that something was wrong as she hadn't felt him move all day, but a scan showed that the baby was fine. Judith would later go on to deliver Harry by cesarean section. Judith appears again in 2018 when Nicola Rubinstein (Nicola Thorp) gave birth to Zack Rubinstein, and again in 2022 when Abi Webster (Sally Carman-Duttine gave birth to Alfie Franklin. She most recently appeared in 2024 when Lauren Bolton (Cait Fitton) gave birth to Frankie Bolton.

== Jenny Lyons ==
Jenny Lyons
- Coronation Street character
- Portrayed by: Natalie Lawless
- Duration: 2000–2001
- First appearance: 3 May 2000
- Last appearance: 4 June 2001
- Introduced by: Jane MacNaught
In-universe information
- Sons: Josh Lyons

Jenny Lyons, portrayed by Natalie Lawless, is a former friend of Sarah-Louise Platt (Tina O'Brien). They first met at a prenatal class, and like Sarah, she also got pregnant at the age of just thirteen. She explained to Sarah that her boyfriend left her after she revealed her pregnancy to him. She then asked midwife Judith Roberts (Jane Hogarth) if her mother can be present at the baby's birth, and Judith happily agreed to the idea. Jenny would give birth to her son Josh (Adam Chapman) later in the year.

When Jenny had her son christened, it inspired Sarah to give her daughter Bethany (Amy and Emily Walton) a christening of her own. Her best friend Candice Stowe (Nikki Sanderson) wanted Jenny to be godmother alongside Hayley Cropper (Julie Hesmondhalgh) as her mother Marion (Paula Simms) had forbidden her to go to the christening as she disapproved of Sarah, but Candice managed to sneak out with her then boyfriend Darren Michaels (Bruno Langley), and get angrily dragged out of the house by an embarrassing Marion. Jenny was present at the christening and the christening party.

Jenny later attended a bonfire with the Platts in November with her mother and baby son Josh. She and Sarah also comforted Candice when she went out with Vikram Desai (Chris Bisson), pretending to be in her twenties, and felt humiliated when he found out she was actually fourteen years old.

Jenny and her son last appeared at Bethany's first birthday party. She met Kevin Webster (Michael Le Vell), who lost his wife Alison (Naomi Radcliffe) and baby son Jake the previous year. He was upset by Josh's name as it was similar to Jake's.

== Eileen Grimshaw ==
Eileen Grimshaw (also Phelan) played by Sue Cleaver, first appeared on 3 May 2000 and departed on 6 June 2025.

== Maria Connor ==
Maria Jane Connor (also Sutherland) is played by Samia Ghadie. The character first appeared on-screen on 19 May 2000. During her time on Coronation Street, Maria has been the centre of storylines such as giving birth to a stillborn baby, sleeping with her best friend's boyfriend and being widowed after eight months of marriage. She also had many failed romances. Maria was off-screen between November 2009 and June 2010 due to Ghadie's pregnancy. She departed again in October 2015 after giving birth to her son the previous month. She returned in April 2016.

== Eric Sutherland ==
Eric Sutherland
- Coronation Street character
- Portrayed by: Steve Money
- Duration: 2000–2001, 2005, 2008, 2015
- First appearance: 19 May 2000
- Last appearance: 9 January 2015
- Introduced by: Jane MacNaught (2000, 2001); Tony Wood (2005); Kim Crowther (2008); Stuart Blackburn (2015)
In-universe information
- Wife: Dot Sutherland
- Sons: Kirk Sutherland
- Daughters: Maria Connor
- Grandsons: Paul Connor Jr. Liam Connor Jr.

Eric Sutherland is the father of Kirk Sutherland (Andrew Whyment) and Maria Connor (Samia Ghadie). He first appears on 19 May 2000 when Jack Duckworth (Bill Tarmey) and Tyrone Dobbs (Alan Halsall) are looking to mate Tyrone's greyhound Monica with one of the studs from his kennels. Eric reappears in 2005 to let Kirk know that he and his wife Dot (Susie Baxter) are retiring to Cyprus and Kirk goes out to visit him for several weeks after Eric has injured his back. He returns on 20 October 2008 to console his daughter following the death of her husband Liam (Rob James-Collier). He carries the coffin at Liam's funeral after Tony Gordon (Gray O'Brien) has to comfort a grief-stricken Carla (Alison King). This causes Liam's mother Helen (Sorcha Cusack) to be unhappy as Eric did not know Liam. Eric and Dot return to Cyprus following the funeral. In January 2015, Eric and Dot attend Kirk's wedding to Beth Tinker (Lisa George). Beth unwittingly insults Eric and Dot before realizing who they are. At the wedding reception, Eric gets drunk and flirts with Tracy Barlow (Kate Ford).

== Kirk Sutherland ==
Kirk Sutherland played by Andrew Whyment, made his first appearance on 22 May 2000, played by an uncredited actor. When Kirk reappeared five months later, the role was played by Whyment who has continued to play the role to date.

== Bethany Platt ==
Bethany Platt, played by Lucy Fallon, made her first appearance on 4 June 2000. Sarah had originally wanted to call her Britney after the pop singer Britney Spears, but changed her mind and opted to make it her middle name instead. Amy and Emily Walton shared the role of Bethany from the character's birth in 2000 until 2007 when Tina O'Brien chose to quit. Mia Cookson also played the role of Britney alongside the Walton twins in September 2000. On 23 October 2014, it was announced that Bethany, now 14 years old, would return to the show. Katie Redford was initially cast in the role, but was sacked just days later before filming began after it was revealed that she was 25 years old, not 19 as she and her management had claimed. On 29 January Blackpool-born Lucy Fallon was confirmed as her replacement. She returned on 20 March 2015. Bethany's storylines have included her taking ecstasy tablets when her uncle, David Platt (Jack P. Shepherd) hid them in a toy, her infatuation with Callum Logan as well as being caught up with her family's feud with Callum.

== Sam Kingston ==
Sam Kingston
- Coronation Street character
- Portrayed by: Scott Wright
- Duration: 2000–2002
- First appearance: 19 June 2000
- Last appearance: 7 June 2002
- Introduced by: Jane MacNaught
In-universe information
- Mother: Brenda Kingston
- Uncles: Pat Hegarty

Sam Kingston is a builder played by actor Scott Wright; he first appeared on 19 June 2000. Soon after his arrival, Sam is revealed as a male stripper, disguising himself as "The Masked Python".

In December 2000, when Sam befriended the Platt family, Sarah-Louise Platt (Tina O'Brien), had a huge crush on him. She wrote about it in her diary but when her younger half-brother, David (Jack P. Shepherd), and his friend Simon got a hold of it, they read the story about Sam and this resulted in David to tell his very concerned father, Martin (Sean Wilson), what he and Simon had read. Both Martin and his ex-wife and Sarah and David's mother, Gail (Helen Worth), became very protective of Sarah about boys since she gave birth to her daughter, Bethany (Amy and Emily Walton), in June 2000 and Martin angrily confronted Sarah at tea, even bringing Sam into the situation, telling them to stay away from each other, humiliating Sarah. The whole family were furious with Martin for the way he treated Sam and wouldn't speak to him for a month.

== Karen McDonald ==
Karen McDonald (also Phillips) played by Suranne Jones, first appeared on episode 4843 broadcast on 21 June 2000 and last appeared on episode 5924 broadcast on 26 December 2004.

== Anthony Stephens ==
Anthony Stephens
- Coronation Street character
- Portrayed by: John Quayle
- Duration: 2000–2001
- First appearance: 28 July 2000
- Last appearance: 1 July 2001
- Introduced by: Jane MacNaught
In-universe information
- Occupation: Book shop owner
- Wife: Isabel Stephens (until 2001)
- Sons: Gregory Stephens
- Daughters: Amanda Stephens

Anthony Stephens, played by John Quayle, was a mild-mannered owner of Stephen's Bookshop. He struck up a friendship with Rita Sullivan (Barbara Knox), which caused a rift between his family as his wife, Isabel Stephens (Dilys Laye) was suffering from Alzheimer's disease and lived in Rose Gardens Nursing Home. Anthony told Rita how lonely he was without his wife being around, so Rita agreed to be friends with him. They even shared a kiss after she introduced him to her friends, Emily Bishop (Eileen Derbyshire) and Norris Cole (Malcolm Hebden). In October 2000, Anthony wanted Rita to meet his two children, Gregory Stephens (Philip Bird) and Amanda Stephens (Martine Brown), which proved to be awkward. Isabel's brother, George Docherty (George Langford-Rowe) took a dislike to Rita and called her a trollop. In November 2000, due to Isabel's condition, Anthony sold up their house and Rita feeling guilty, ended their relationship. Anthony then moved in with Amanda.

Anthony had dinner on 31 December (New Year's Eve) with Rita, Emily and Norris. Rita was determined not to let Amanda put her off Anthony and after tensions continued to grow between father and daughter, Rita invited him to move into No. 12a with her. After Isabel died in June 2001, he moved to New Zealand to live with his sister, Joan. He invited Rita to come with him, but she declined.

== Darren Michaels ==
Darren Michaels
- Coronation Street character
- Portrayed by: Bruno Langley (2000); Nicholas Zabel (2001)
- Duration: 2000–2001
- First appearance: 4 August 2000
- Last appearance: 4 March 2001
- Introduced by: Jane MacNaught

Darren Michaels, portrayed by Bruno Langley in 2000 and by Nicholas Zabel in 2001, is Candice Stowe's (Nikki Sanderson) short-term boyfriend. Candice first mentioned him to her best friend Sarah-Louise Platt (Tina O'Brien), who was upset as she thought, because of her teenage pregnancy, she will never have a boyfriend. Bruno Langley originally portrayed Darren in 2000, but then began playing the role of regular character, Todd Grimshaw, 4 months later from 2001 onwards.

Darren's first appearance was at Sarah's daughter Bethany's (Amy and Emily Walton) christening; Candice snuck out of the house with him so she can attend the christening and be Bethany's godmother alongside Hayley Cropper (Julie Hesmondhalgh), as her mother Marion (Paula Simms) had forbidden her to go. Marion would later gate crash the christening party and drag Candice off.

In March 2001, Darren discovered from Sarah's younger brother David (Jack P. Shepherd) that Candice was two timing him and Todd Grimshaw (Langley). He would inform Todd of this, and the two boys dumped Candice, but Todd and Candice gave their relationship another go as Candice convinced Todd that she was only using Darren.

== Isabel Stephens ==
Isabel Stephens
- Coronation Street character
- Portrayed by: Dilys Lane
- Duration: 2000–2001
- First appearance: 24 August 2000
- Last appearance: 7 February 2001
- Introduced by: Jane MacNaught
In-universe information
- Brothers: George Docherty
- Husband: Anthony Stephens (until 2001)
- Sons: Gregory Stephens
- Daughters: Amanda Stephens

Isabel Stephens, played by Dilys Lane, is married to Anthony Stephens, who suffered from Alzheimer's disease and lived in Rose Gardens Nursing Home. Growing lonely in her absence, Anthony began a relationship with Rita Sullivan (Barbara Knox), much to the disgust of their daughter, Amanda Stephens (Martine Brown) and Isabel's brother, George Docherty (George Langford-Rowe), who called Rita a trollop. As a result of Anthony's betrayal, George decided he wasn't going to put any more money towards the shared expenses of Isabel's care and left Anthony to pay for it all himself.

Anthony continued his relationship with Rita, despite his family's disapproval. He ended up selling his house and moved in with Amanda, which infuriated her, causing her to use her mother to guilt-trip him. In February 2001, Anthony wanted to file for a divorce against Isabel so he could continue his relationship with Rita, but Amanda and George along with Anthony and Isabel's son, Gregory Stephens (Philip Bird) all ganged up on Anthony and disowned him. In June 2001, Isabel died from heart failure in her care home.

== Phil Simmonds ==
Phil Simmonds
- Coronation Street character
- Portrayed by: Jack Deam
- Duration: 2000–2001
- First appearance: 1 September 2000
- Last appearance: 6 August 2001
- Introduced by: Jane MacNaught
In-universe information
- Daughters: Rose Battersby

Phil Simmonds befriends Toyah Battersby (Georgia Taylor) after landlord Duggie Ferguson (John Bowe) makes him homeless in September 2000. He takes legal action against Duggie but later settles out of court. He reappears on 9 April 2001, when Toyah encounters him on the street. Four days later, Phil brutally rapes Toyah in the ginnel behind the Rovers. Toyah is left clueless as to the identity of her attacker as Phil pretends to support her through her ordeal. On 30 April 2001, when Toyah is on her own in her house with Phil she suddenly recognises his voice as being that of the rapist. Peter Barlow (Chris Gascoyne) hears her screams from the street, breaks into the house and saves her from Phil.

In August 2001, Toyah visits Phil in prison, after he sends her a letter pleading for her forgiveness. She is shocked to see that he has attempted suicide. She gets Phil to agree to plead guilty to the rape charges. However, Toyah later discovers that Phil has no intention of pleading guilty, despite the DNA evidence. He later changes his plea to guilty, meaning that no trial would take place, much to Toyah's relief. On 7 September 2001, Phil is sentenced to ten years imprisonment for Toyah's rape.

== Harvey Reuben ==
Harvey Reuben
- Coronation Street character
- Portrayed by: Andrew Scarborough
- Duration: 2000–2001
- First appearance: 13 September 2000
- Last appearance: 5 August 2001
- Introduced by: Jane MacNaught
In-universe information
- Occupation: Factory Owner

Harvey Reuben, played by Andrew Scarborough, was the temporary manager of Underworld whilst Mike Baldwin (Johnny Briggs) and Linda Baldwin (Jacqueline Pirie) were on honeymoon. He first arrived late due to the arrangement being last minute, but was very popular with staff members, Bobbi Lewis (Naomi Ryan) and Karen Phillips (Suranne Jones). He began to flirt with the ladies, and Karen flirted back, but he was far more interested in Bobbi. Karen continued to try and please Harvey by bringing him coffee and talking about clubbing in London, but Bobbi told Janice Battersby (Vicky Entwistle) that he wasn't interested in her. Janice told Bobbi that she had more of a chance with Harvey and advised her to take him up on his advances. After a conversation with Dev Alahan (Jimmi Harkishin) in The Rovers, it was revealed that Harvey was actually engaged. He subsequently took both ladies out, which infuriated them both so as revenge, they organised a farewell party and sprayed graffiti on his car saying "slime ball".

Harvey returned in June 2001 when he told Mike that he was taking over his father's company, Reuben's Textiles in Bolton. Despite facing a frosty reception from Bobbi and Karen, he struck up a relationship with Linda, causing a rift between him and Mike.

== Amanda Stephens ==
Amanda Stephens
- Coronation Street character
- Portrayed by: Martine Brown
- Duration: 2000–2001
- First appearance: 4 October 2000
- Last appearance: 19 February 2001
- Introduced by: Jane MacNaught
In-universe information
- Occupation: Accountant
- Father: Anthony Stephens
- Mother: Isabel Stephens
- Daughters: Amanda Stephens
- Uncles: George Docherty

Amanda Stephens, played by Martine Brown, is the daughter of Anthony Stephens (John Quayle) and Isabel Stephens (Dilys Laye). Isabel was suffering from Alzheimer's disease and lived in Rose Gardens Nursing Home. Amanda first appears when she and her brother, Gregory Stephens (Philip Bird) are introduced to Rita Sullivan (Barbara Knox) by their father, who has recently started having an affair with her. Amanda didn't take the news too well and confided in her uncle, George Docherty (George Langford-Rowe) who called Rita a trollop. He also decided he would no longer contribute to the shared costs of Isabel's care due to his betrayal, so Anthony sold the house and moved in with Amanda, much to her dismay.

In February 2001, Anthony wished to file for a divorce against Isabel so he could continue his relationship with Rita. This angered Amanda, her brother and uncle and they all disowned Anthony. In June 2001, Isabel died in the care home due to heart failure.

== Gregory Stephens ==
Gregory Stephens
- Coronation Street character
- Portrayed by: Philip Bird
- Duration: 2000–2001
- First appearance: 4 October 2000
- Last appearance: 3 February 2001
- Introduced by: Jane MacNaught
In-universe information
- Father: Anthony Stephens
- Mother: Isabel Stephens
- Sisters: Amanda Stephens
- Uncles: George Docherty

Gregory Stephens, played by Philip Bird, is the son of Anthony Stephens (John Quayle) and Isabel Stephens (Dilys Laye). Isabel was suffering from Alzheimer's disease and lived in Rose Gardens Nursing Home. Amanda first appears when she and her brother, Amanda Stephens (Martine Brown) are introduced to Rita Sullivan (Barbara Knox) by their father, who has recently started having an affair with her. Amanda didn't take the news too well and confided in her uncle, George Docherty (George Langford-Rowe) who called Rita a trollop. He also decided he would no longer contribute to the shared costs of Isabel's care due to his betrayal, so Anthony sold the house and moved in with Amanda, much to her dismay.

In February 2001, Anthony wished to file for a divorce against Isabel so he could continue his relationship with Rita. This angered Amanda, her brother and uncle and they all disowned Anthony. In June 2001, Isabel died in the care home due to heart failure.

== Dean Sykes ==
Dean Sykes
- Coronation Street character
- Portrayed by: Ciarán Griffiths
- First appearance: 11 October 2000
- Last appearance: 12 October 2000
- Introduced by: Jane MacNaught
In-universe information
- Father: Ray Sykes
- Mother: Eve Elliott
- Brothers: Jimmy Sykes; Ryan Sykes
- Sisters: Linda Sykes

Dean Sykes is Linda Sykes' (Jacqueline Pirie) brother, and appears in two episodes. Dean and his companion, Lenny Larkin, stage an armed raid at Freshco's Supermarket. When the shop is closed, however, Dean hopes he can raid the safe in the supermarket, and escape with thousands of pounds. As the siege grows, the police surround Freshco's. The climax occurs when the authorities burst in and police markswoman Emma Taylor (Angela Lonsdale) fires two shots at Dean, who dies on the way to hospital.

In December 2022, 22 years after playing Dean Sykes, Griffiths returned to Coronation Street to play Damon Hay, who was the estranged father of Jacob Hay (Jack James Ryan) and half-brother of Harvey Gaskell (Will Mellor).

== Ray Sykes ==
Ray Sykes
- Coronation Street character
- Portrayed by: Peter Guinness
- Duration: 2000, 2002
- First appearance: 13 October 2000
- Last appearance: 22 April 2002
In-universe information
- Spouse: Eve Elliott (divorced)
- Sons: Dean Sykes; Ryan Sykes; Jimmy Sykes
- Daughters: Linda Sykes

Ray Sykes, played by Peter Guinness, is the father of Linda Sykes (Jacqueline Pirie).

Ray's wife Eve (Melanie Kilburn) had walked out on him and their children and Linda had been forced to help Ray raise her brothers, Dean (Ciarán Griffiths), Ryan (Matthew Dunster), and Jimmy (Danny Cunningham).

Ray first appears after his son Dean is shot dead by the police while committing a robbery at Freshco's supermarket and meets Linda's husband Mike Baldwin (Johnny Briggs). Mike, who had been held prisoner by Dean during the robbery, is angry by Ray's belief that Dean had been a victim and angrily informs Ray that his son was a violent robber and Linda is forced to intervene to stop a fight breaking out.

Mike is further angered when Ray accuses Linda of marrying him for his money and Linda tells Ray that he treated her like a skivvy following her mother's abandonment. She then offers to pay for Dean's funeral. Ray attends the funeral and is unexpectedly reunited with his ex-wife Eve who shows up to say goodbye to her son. Linda is hostile towards Eve, blaming her for Dean going off the rails and his subsequent death, and Ray comforts her.

Ray does not appear again until two years later when Eve goes to visit him and he reveals that Linda, who had been missing for seven months, was alive and well and living in Dublin. Ray tells Eve not to tell anyone that Linda is alive. Eve's husband Fred Elliott (John Savident), had followed Eve after being suspicious of her behaviour and witnesses her say goodbye to Ray on his doorstep and jumps to the wrong conclusion, that they are having an affair.

The next day, Fred sees Ray in the area and asks Mike if Ray had been into the Rovers during the day. Fred later goes to visit Ray at his home and asks him what is going on between him and Eve. Ray refuses to tell Fred why Eve visited him but reveals that he and Eve never divorced, making her marriage to Fred bigamous. Fred leaves in shock and this is Ray's last appearance in the show.

== Jimmy Sykes ==
Jimmy Sykes
- Coronation Street character
- Portrayed by: Danny Cunningham
- Duration: 2000-2001
- First appearance: 13 October 2000
- Last appearance: 12 November 2001
In-universe information
- Father: Ray Sykes
- Mother: Eve Elliott
- Brothers: Dean Sykes; Ryan Sykes
- Sisters: Linda Sykes

Jimmy Sykes, played by Danny Cunningham, is the son of Ray Sykes (Peter Guinness) and Eve Elliott (Melanie Kilburn) as well as the brother of Linda Sykes (Jacqueline Pirie), Dean Sykes (Ciarán Griffiths) and Ryan Sykes (Matthew Dunster). He first appears on 13 October when he arrives in Weatherfield for the funeral of his brother Dean, who was shot twice by markswoman, Emma Taylor (Angela Lonsdale) and later dies on the way to hospital, after he staged an armed raid at Freshco's Supermarket. Over the course of the next year, Jimmy appears on a recurring basis and made his final appearance on 12 November 2001.

20 years after being cast as Jimmy Sykes, Cunningham was cast as Connor Cooper in ITV soap opera Emmerdale, which as also a recurring role between 2020 and 2021. Cunningham returned to Coronation Street in 2024, nearly 23 years after playing Jimmy, to play Denny Foreman, the father of Gemma Winter (Dolly-Rose Campbell) and Paul Foreman (Peter Ash) and ex-partner of Bernie Winter (Jane Hazlegrove).

== Eve Sykes ==
Eve Sykes
- Coronation Street character
- Portrayed by: Melanie Kilburn
- Duration: 2000–2002
- First appearance: 20 October 2000
- Last appearance: 10 May 2002
- Introduced by: Jane MacNaught
In-universe information
- Occupation: Pub landlady (2002)
- Husband: Ray Sykes (divorced)
- Sons: Dean Sykes; Ryan Sykes; Jimmy Sykes
- Daughters: Linda Sykes

Eve Sykes is married to Ray (Peter Guinness), she first appears at the funeral of her son Dean (Ciarán Griffiths) in October 2000. Eve tries to explain to daughter Linda Sykes (Jacqueline Pirie) why she abandoned the family but Linda holds her responsible for Dean going off the rails and is upset that she left her to be mother to her brothers.

Eve leaves after Fred discovers that she is still married to the father of her children, Ray (Peter Guinness), and that her marriage to Fred is therefore void.

== Ryan Sykes ==
Ryan Sykes
- Coronation Street character
- Portrayed by: Matthew Dunster
- Duration: 2000–2001
- First appearance: 20 October 2000
- Last appearance: 21 October 2001
- Introduced by: Jane MacNaught
In-universe information
- Father: Ray Sykes
- Brothers: Dean Sykes; Jimmy Sykes
- Sisters: Linda Sykes

Ryan Sykes, played by Matthew Dunster, is the son of Ray Sykes (Peter Guinness) and Eve Elliott (Melanie Kilburn) as well as the brother of Linda Sykes (Jacqueline Pirie), Dean Sykes (Ciarán Griffiths) and Jimmy Sykes (Danny Cunningham), who first appears on 20 October for his brother Dean's funeral, who was shot twice by markswoman Emma Taylor (Angela Lonsdale) and later dies on the way to hospital, after he staged an armed raid at Freshco's Supermarket.

He initially made a guest appearance on his first, but is later reintroduced on a recurring basis from 26 February 2001 until he made his final appearance on 21 October 2001.

== Dot Sutherland ==
Dot Sutherland
- Coronation Street character
- Portrayed by: Susie Baxter
- Duration: 2000, 2005, 2008, 2015
- First appearance: 22 October 2000
- Last appearance: 9 January 2015
- Introduced by: Jane MacNaught (2000); Tony Wood (2005); Kim Crowther (2008); Stuart Blackburn (2015)
In-universe information
- Sisters: Ruby
- Husband: Eric Sutherland
- Sons: Kirk Sutherland
- Daughters: Maria Connor
- Grandsons: Paul Connor Jr. Liam Connor Jr. Craig Tinker (step)

Dot Sutherland is the mother of Kirk Sutherland (Andrew Whyment) and Maria Connor (Samia Ghadie). She first appears on 22 October 2000 when she attends Maria's engagement party to Tyrone Dobbs (Alan Halsall). In 2005, she and her husband Eric (Steve Money) decide to relocate to Cyprus to run a donkey sanctuary and leave the dog kennels to Kirk for him to run. Dotty returns on 20 October 2008 to console her daughter following the death of her husband Liam (Rob James-Collier). Maria berates her parents for going on a cruise instead of to her wedding; Dotty says they had been hurt that Maria had not considered postponing the wedding until they got back. When she leaves on 31 October 2008, she tells her daughter that she wished she had met Liam. In January 2015, Dot and Eric attend Kirk's wedding to Beth Tinker (Lisa George). Dot also drunkenly reminisces about Kirk's past girlfriends which makes Beth feel insecure.

== Alice Watts ==
Alice Watts
- Coronation Street character
- Portrayed by: Annabelle Tarrant
- First appearance: 25 October 2000
- Last appearance: 26 December 2000
- Introduced by: Jane MacNaught
In-universe information
- Father: Curly Watts
- Mother: Raquel Watts
- Stepfather: Armand de Beaux
- Stepmother: Emma Watts
- Half-brothers: Ben Watts

Alice Watts, portrayed by Annabelle Tarrant, is the daughter of Curly (Kevin Kennedy) and Raquel Watts (Sarah Lancashire). She was born off-screen in 1997, the year after Raquel initially left Coronation Street. Raquel chose not to tell Curly about their daughter because she worried he would try and force her back into his life again, but told Alice about him and pointed to the star she was named after. Raquel returned to Weatherfield in January 2000 to tell Curly she was going to remarry to a man named Armand de Beaux, whom she worked for as a nanny. A photo of Alice was seen on 2 January 2000, nine months before she first appeared. Curly was angered by Raquel's decision to remarry, but was reassured he would still get to see Alice.

Alice first appeared on 25 October 2000 when Curly and his new girlfriend, Emma Taylor (Angela Lonsdale) visited Chateau Armand. Alice was initially nervous to meet the couple as Raquel, Armand and their newborn son went on holiday, leaving her with housekeeper, Christine Glover, ho she clung onto, so the couple could meet her. After meeting Alice, Emma had arranged for her to be a bridesmaid at her and Curly's wedding on Christmas Eve 2000.

== Josh Lyons ==
Josh Lyons
- Coronation Street character
- Portrayed by: Adam Chapman
- Duration: 2000–2001
- First appearance: 3 November 2000
- Last appearance: 4 June 2001
- Introduced by: Jane MacNaught
In-universe information
- Mother: Jenny Lyons

Josh Lyons, portrayed by Adam Chapman, is the son of Jenny Lyons (Natalie Lawless), who was good friends with Sarah-Louise Platt (Tina O'Brien).

Like Sarah, Jenny got pregnant in her early teens with Josh and his father did not want to be involved in his life. Josh was mentioned twice; once by Sarah and the second time by Jenny. His christening inspired Sarah to get her baby daughter Bethany (Amy and Emily Walton) christened and at the party, Jenny mentioned that Josh had developed the ability to be sick with great force. This caused Sarah's best mate Candice Stowe (Nikki Sanderson), who was holding her goddaughter, to hand Bethany over to Roy Cropper (David Neilson).

Josh made his first appearance in November 2000 when he, his mother and grandmother went to the Platts' house for a bonfire. As Jenny held Josh, she and Sarah comforted Candice, who went out with the much older Vikram Desai (Chris Bisson) and felt embarrassed when he discovered her real age.

Josh and Jenny attended Bethany's first birthday party and Jenny met Kevin Webster (Michael Le Vell). Kevin lost his wife and baby son, Alison (Naomi Radcliffe) and Jake, the previous year. He was devastated when he heard Josh's name as it was similar to his dead son's name.

== Glen Middleham ==
Glen Middleham
- Coronation Street character
- Portrayed by: Will Haigh
- Duration: 2000–2001
- First appearance: 5 November 2000
- Last appearance: 7 January 2001
- Introduced by: Jane MacNaught

Glen Middleham, portrayed by Will Haigh, was a short-term boyfriend of Sarah-Louise Platt (Tina O'Brien). Sarah and Glen first met at the pictures, and they got on well although Sarah didn't mention she was a teenage mother to a baby daughter named Bethany (Amy and Emily Walton). Her and Glen then went bowling, and it ended well with a kiss.

Much to her best mate Candice Stowe's (Nikki Sanderson) disgust, Sarah kept Bethany hidden from Glen, afraid he might not want to date her; she even pretended that Bethany was Hayley Cropper's (Julie Hesmondhalgh) daughter and was babysitting, but Glen discovered that Bethany is, in fact, Sarah's daughter when Sarah's adoptive father Martin (Sean Wilson) caught the two alone at home and revealed all to Glen. Glen left the house angry and confused.

On 1 January (New Year's Day) 2001, Glen came back and Sarah explained everything to him, so they got back together, but Sarah was having suspicions that Glen was only using her for sex, and she confided in Candice about it. Sarah's suspicions were right when Candice confronted her about her and Glen having sex on New Year's Day, which really didn't happen, and Sarah dumped Glen when she discovered he had started the rumors.

== Molly Hardcastle ==
Molly Hardcastle
- Coronation Street character
- Portrayed by: Jacqueline Kington
- Duration: 2000–2002
- First appearance: 5 November 2000
- Last appearance: 20 May 2002
- Introduced by: Jane MacNaught
In-universe information
- Occupation: Practice Nurse

Molly Hardcastle was played by Jacqueline Kington. She first appears as the new practice nurse in the medical centre on Rosamund Street. She goes on to have a relationship with Kevin Webster (Michael Le Vell) who is estranged from wife Sally (Sally Dynevor). She leaves Weatherfield after breaking up with Kevin in May 2002. She was last mentioned in November 2009 by Tyrone Dobbs (Alan Halsall) to his wife also called Molly (Vicky Binns), while listing all of Kevin's relationships with women. Unbeknownst to Tyrone, his wife had just started an affair with Kevin. Upon hearing about his previous affairs behind Sally's back, Molly Dobbs confronted Kevin, making particular reference to the fact she was not the first woman called Molly he had been with.

== George Docherty ==
George Docherty
- Coronation Street character
- Portrayed by: George Langford-Rowe
- Duration: 2000–2001
- First appearance: 15 November 2000
- Last appearance: 3 February 2001
- Introduced by: Jane MacNaught
In-universe information
- Sisters: Isabel Stephens
- Nephews: Gregory Stephens
- Nieces: Amanda Stephens

George Docherty, played by George Langford-Rowe, is the brother of Isabel Stephens (Dilys Laye), who was suffering from Alzheimer's disease and lived in Rose Gardens Nursing Home. He first appears when his niece, Amanda Stephens (Martine Brown) contacted him to tell him that their father, Anthony Stephens (John Quayle) had started an affair with Rita Sullivan (Barbara Knox), whom he had introduced her and her brother, Gregory Stephens (Philip Bird) to. As a result, George called Rita a trollop and decided he would no longer contribute to the shared costs of Isabel's care due to his betrayal. This meant that Anthony would sell his house to pay off the costs of Isabel's care, causing him to move in with Amanda, much to her despair.

In February 2001, Anthony wished to file for a divorce against Isabel so he could continue his relationship with Rita. This angered George, his niece and nephew and they all disowned Anthony. In June 2001, Isabel died in the care home due to heart failure.

== Matt Ramsden ==
Matt Ramsden
- Coronation Street character
- Portrayed by: Stephen Beckett
- Duration: 2000–2002, 2006
- First appearance: 22 November 2000
- Last appearance: 17 July 2006
- Introduced by: Jane MacNaught (2000); Steve Frost (2006)
In-universe information
- Occupation: Doctor
- Wife: Charlie Johnson (1992–2003); Sylvia Ramsden (200?–)
- Sons: Joshua Peacock

Matthew "Dr. Matt" Ramsden and his alcoholic schoolteacher wife Charlie (Clare McGlinn) moved to Coronation Street when the new Medical Centre on Rosamund Street opened its doors and Matt got a job there as a GP.

Matt is the biological father of Joshua Peacock (Benjamin Beresford), after having a drunken one-night stand with Ashley Peacock's (Steven Arnold) wife, Maxine (Tracy Shaw). Matt left Weatherfield when Joshua was only a week old in an attempt to rebuild his and Charlie's marriage. Maxine was murdered in January 2003, leaving Ashley to raise Joshua. In 2006, Matt reappeared with a new wife seeking access to his estranged son. Ashley went to court to stop Matt seeing Joshua, but at the last minute, decided to grant Matt limited visitation rights so that the judge would not make the decision.

On Matt's first visit, Ashley's wife Claire Peacock (Julia Haworth) went into labour, and Matt helped her deliver her baby son on the living room couch. After the birth of Freddie, Ashley thanks Matt, but reminds him that this does not change anything. Matt has not been seen since but has been referred to subsequently, often visiting Joshua and taking him out, off-screen.

== Charlie Ramsden ==
Charlie Ramsden
- Coronation Street character
- Portrayed by: Clare McGlinn
- Duration: 2000–2002
- First appearance: 22 November 2000
- Last appearance: 16 April 2002
- Introduced by: Jane MacNaught
In-universe information
- Occupation: English teacher
- Mother: Pam Hargreaves
- Half-brothers: Luke Ashton
- Half-sisters: Christine Hargreaves
- Husband: Matt Ramsden (1992–2003)
- Nieces: Lucy Hargreaves

Charlotte "Charlie" Ramsden (also Johnson and Hargreaves) was the wife of Matt Ramsden (Stephen Beckett), played by actress Clare McGlinn from 2000 to 2002.

Charlie arrives in Weatherfield with her husband Matt in November 2000, having bought Natalie Barnes' (Denise Welch) house. She is first seen breaking up a fight between Sarah-Louise Platt (Tina O'Brien) and David Platt (Jack P. Shepherd), and Sarah recognises her as her English teacher at school. Charlie does not properly settle in Weatherfield due to her snobbish attitude and also due to the fact that most of the teenage residents were her students. She makes friends with Emma Watts (Angela Lonsdale), but takes an instant dislike to Maxine Peacock (Tracy Shaw). It soon becomes apparent that Charlie is an alcoholic, due in part to the fact that she had been given up for adoption as a child. Charlie tracked down her birth mother and was horrified to discover a student of hers, Luke Ashton, was her half-brother.

Her marriage to Matt becomes increasingly rocky during their time in Weatherfield as a result of Charlie's alcoholism. Matt wants to have a family but Charlie does not, and when she becomes pregnant she immediately books an abortion. She confides in Emma and Maxine about this, leading Maxine to warn Matt before she goes through with the procedure. Matt tries desperately to stop Charlie going ahead with the abortion, but she does anyway. Maxine then comforts a distraught Matt, leading to her revealing that he might be the father of her unborn child. When Charlie returns home from the abortion clinic Matt reveals Maxine's news to her. Charlie is devastated to learn of the couple's one-night stand and walks out on Matt. Charlie takes the news badly and continues drinking heavily, even at work and as a result is suspended from her job. Charlie then agrees to give Matt another chance on condition that they leave the area for a fresh start. The Ramsdens pack their bags and leave in the middle of the night.

In 2006, Matt returns to Weatherfield, wanting access to Joshua and is married to a woman called Sylvia, indicating that he and Charlie had split up and divorced in the intervening years.

== Paul Clayton ==
Paul Clayton played by Lee Booth (2000-2001), Tom Hudson (2007-2008), first appeared on episode 4938 broadcast on 29 November 2000 and last appeared on episode 6827 broadcast on 25 May 2008.

== Wayne Hayes ==
Wayne Hayes
- Coronation Street character
- Portrayed by: Gary Damer (2000–2001); Adam Barlow (2019)
- Duration: 2000–2001, 2019
- First appearance: 22 December 2000
- Last appearance: 19 June 2019
- Introduced by: Jane MacNaught (2000); Iain MacLeod (2019)
In-universe information
- Occupation: Health and safety inspector
- Mother: Sheila Hayes
- Stepfather: Alex Swinton

Wayne Hayes is a young teenager who is first seen breaking into Roy's Rolls café in search of food. Roy Cropper (David Neilson) later sees Wayne in the building yard and invites him in for some food. Roy and his wife Hayley (Julie Hesmondhalgh) discover that he lives in a children's home, but has run away from his mother, Sheila's, where he was to spend Christmas. Roy later witnesses Sheila's boyfriend, Alex Swinton, hitting Wayne and they are unhappy about bringing him back to the children's home as he is evidently unhappy there.

Roy and Hayley grow close to Wayne and harbour hopes of fostering him, despite the presence of troublemaker Alex. Their application for fostering is approved in January 2001. In June 2001, Hayley bumps into Wayne and Sheila. It soon emerges that Alex is still hitting Wayne. When the social workers get involved, both Wayne and Sheila are forced to lie that no abuse is taking place. When Alex later offers Wayne to Roy and Hayley in exchange for £10,000, Roy agrees to pay him, as they fear for Wayne's safety. Sheila decides that it would be best for Wayne to stay with Roy and Hayley even after finding out about the deal.

When Alex starts to demand more money for Wayne, Roy and Hayley soon realise that they are backed into a corner as they do not have legal custody of Wayne. In July 2001, they decide that they need to get Wayne away from Alex for good and the three go on the run in Martin Platt's (Sean Wilson) car. Events become serious when the media begin reporting that the Croppers have kidnapped Wayne. Amidst the media frenzy, the trio stay with an old friend of Hayley's, Ruth Audsley, in the countryside. Eventually, Ruth informs the police of their whereabouts and Roy and Hayley are subsequently arrested for Wayne's abduction. Wayne is then returned to Sheila and Alex, where he is threatened by Alex not to tell the police about their consent to him living with Roy and Hayley. Alex is later arrested when Sheila makes a statement to the police, placing the Roy and Hayley in the clear. On 24 December (Christmas Eve) 2001, Wayne reappears when he and Sheila visit Roy and Hayley at the café.

Wayne returns in March 2019, 18 years since his last visit to Weatherfield. He visits Roy and tells him that he is investigating the Underworld factory roof collapse as a health and safety inspector, which killed Rana Habeeb (Bhavna Limbachia). Wayne is upset when Roy informs him that Hayley died from pancreatic cancer five years prior to his return, and thanks Roy for everything that he and Hayley did for him, regarding the situation with Alex. Wayne is convinced that Roy's close friend and lodger, Carla Connor (Alison King) is responsible for the roof collapse, and interviews all people who had a role to play in the roof's eventual collapse, including Carla, Gary Windass (Mikey North), Sally Metcalfe (Sally Dynevor) and Nick Tilsley (Ben Price). He concludes that Sally, despite being on the roof while protesting when it collapsed, is by no means responsible, as the roof should have been able to take her weight. He also rules Gary out of his inquiries, after Peter Barlow (Chris Gascoyne) bribes him into not mentioning that he knew the roof was unsafe in order to protect Carla.

In 2019, Laura-Jayne Tyler from Inside Soap praised the casting of Barlow, writing, "They've done a tremendous job with the recast of Wayne on Corrie. We're just sad that Hayley isn't here to see the fine, upstanding chap he's grown into."

== Jason Grimshaw ==
Jason Grimshaw played by Ryan Thomas, first appeared on 25 December (Christmas Day) 2000 and last appeared in mid-2016. Returned on 30 May 2025 as part of Eileen Grimshaw's (Sue Cleaver) departure taking place on 6 June 2025.

== Simon Green ==
Simon Green
- Coronation Street character
- Portrayed by: Lee Battle
- Duration: 2000–2001
- First appearance: 31 December 2000
- Last appearance: 5 November 2001
- Introduced by: Jane MacNaught

Simon Green, played by Lee Battle, was a good friend of David Platt (Jack P. Shepherd). The two of them used to frequently play pranks on the other residents of Coronation Street. Simon used to meet David and his father, Martin Platt (Sean Wilson) in The Rovers Return public house when they began to allow children in. On one occasion, they played a prank on Kevin Webster (Michael Le Vell) by loosening the lid on his salt shaker, so when he went to shake salt onto his meal, it poured all over his pie and chips, causing him annoyance and he demanded a new meal. This made the landlord, Duggie Ferguson (John Bowe) reconsider his new policy. Simon and David then annoyed Norris Cole (Malcolm Hebden) when they stole his trolley full of census forms and putting two bricks on top of the forms so Norris couldn't reclaim the trolley. On another occasion, Curly Watts (Kevin Kennedy) asked the two boys to deliver campaign letters for £10 each. They took the money, but didn't deliver the letters and when they saw Curly the next day, they hid behind Ashley Peacock's (Steven Arnold) car.

Simon and David then got up to mischief together once again when they began kicking bin bags outside of the Rosamund Street Medical Centre. David's mother, Gail Platt (Helen Worth), saw the mess they made and told them to sweep it up once they had finished school. The two boys had another idea, however, when they took the rubbish back to 8 Coronation Street, where David lives, and set fire to it in the garden, but they ran out of matches. After Simon left, one of the discarded matches caused the garden to set on fire. This incident didn't help the two boys' case when they were accused of setting the Underworld factory alight on Bonfire Night, as they had stolen one of Les Battersby's (Bruce Jones) damp fireworks. Gail initially suspected both boys were responsible after seeing them stand outside the factory when they saw the fire, but Simon showed her the unused firework.

== Other characters ==
Character	Episode date(s)	Actor	Circumstances
Amy Goskirk	10 January – 6 February	Jayne Ashbourne	The ex-girlfriend of Dev Alahan's (Jimmi Harkishin) who follows him to Weatherfield from Birmingham. Dev is not pleased to see her and is hostile, even physically evicting her from his shop.
Dr Wilson	21 – 23 February	Lois Higgins	A doctor consulted by Gail Platt (Helen Worth) as her thirteen-year-old daughter Sarah-Louise (Tina O'Brien) began getting sick after she refused to eat, and was concerned she might be developing an eating disorder. However, when the doctor examined the young girl, she told the shocked mother and daughter she was pregnant. Dr. Wilson told Gail that Sarah was too far along to have an abortion and that social services will have to be called in. Lydia Summers (Alison Darling) was informed by Dr. Wilson of Sarah's pregnancy and she came over to 8 Coronation Street to discuss the situation.
Lydia Summers	27 February	Alison Darling	A social worker who visited the Platt family to support Sarah-Louise (Tina O'Brien) and her family in relation to Sarah's pregnancy. Dr. Wilson had informed Gail (Helen Worth) that social services will be visiting. Lydia came to 8 Coronation Street in the middle of a row with Sarah, Gail, and Sarah's adoptive father Martin (Sean Wilson), who was under suspicion of being the baby's father. This angered Martin as Lydia asked Gail about her working hours at Roy Cropper's (David Neilson) café and how long he stayed at home with the children. She also had a private chat with Sarah in her bedroom and encouraged her to tell her who the father of her baby is, which she was reluctant to do so and didn’t reveal his name. When Lydia asks Sarah how she feels about the baby she told her how she felt scared, but Lydia reassured that Sarah was. not on her own.
Neil Fearns	6 – 26 March	Paul Holowaty	The father of Sarah-Louise Platt's (Tina O'Brien) daughter, Bethany (Amy and Emily Walton). He is an "absent father" and has nothing to do with Bethany, although his family do send a card for her first birthday. In 2003, it is revealed that Neil has died in a car accident. Martin (Sean Wilson) and Gail Platt (Helen Worth) break the news to Sarah, who is shocked at Neil's death but not overly emotional. At Martin's insistence, Sarah takes Bethany to Neil's funeral where she meets his mother, Brenda (Julia Deakin).
Mrs. Paton	13 – 26 March	Janice McKenzie	The head teacher at Weatherfield Comprehensive, and was informed of Sarah-Louise Platt's (Tina O'Brien) pregnancy. She assured Sarah and her concerned parents that Sarah will receive support from the school staff, which Martin was apprehensive about as he didn't want the baby's father Neil Fearns (Paul Holowaty) to be involved. Paton then informed Sarah a week later that the school staff were wanting her to take a job backstage for the production of Grease.
Kirsten Grant	13 March – 19 May	Vicky Connett	One of the pupils who stirred at Sarah-Louise Platt (Tina O'Brien) when there were rumours that she was pregnant. She bullied her along with some other pupils when they put a baby doll in her locker and called her names but her best mate, Candice Stowe (Nikki Sanderson), stood up for her. At a school dance, Kirsten apologised to Sarah for her past behaviour (Candice previously mentioned to Sarah that Kirsten has since changed). When Sarah saw Candice and Kirsten dancing with some boys, she realised that because of her pregnancy, she didn't fit in with the crowd any more.
Mr. Fearns	29 March	Eric Hulme	the father of Neil Fearns (Paul Holowaty) who impregnates Sarah-Louise Platt (Tina O'Brien) when they are 12 years old. He offers the Platt family help with the baby, which Sarah's mother Gail (Helen Worth) refuses as Neil is not willing to take responsibility for the child. He makes his only appearance just over two months before Sarah's baby is born. Following Neil's death, it is revealed that Mr. Fearns had left his wife Brenda for a "younger model".
Maya Desai	23 April-13 August	Indira Joshi	The sister-in-law of Ravi Desai (Saeed Jaffrey), who stepped out of retirement to help out at the corner shop.
Jake Webster	5 June	Uncredited	The son of Kevin (Michael Le Vell) and Alison Webster (Naomi Radcliffe), born on 5 June 2000. Shortly after his birth Jake turned blue and is diagnosed with a Group B streptococcal infection. Jake's condition proves to be fatal and he dies minutes later in Alison's arms. Following Jake's death, Alison committed suicide by throwing herself in front of a lorry.
Tegwin Thomas	23 June	Howell Evans	A photographer took a photograph of the Platt family. He seemed to be a good friend of Audrey Roberts (Sue Nicholls), but a dislike to the rest of the family. He also seemed to be too nice to Audrey's granddaughter Sarah-Louise Platt (Tina O'Brien) as he compared her to Audrey and asked her about modeling, which angered her adoptive father Martin (Sean Wilson). However, he was uncomfortable when he discovered Sarah was a teenage mother to a baby daughter named Bethany (Amy and Emily Walton).
