= Les Battersby =

Fictional character from Coronation Street

- Coronation Street character
- Portrayed by: Bruce Jones
- Duration: 1997–2007
- First appearance: 4 July 1997
- Last appearance: 6 May 2007
- Introduced by: Brian Park
In-universe information
- Occupation: Taxi driver Roadie
- Mother: Betty Battersby
- Sisters: Josie Battersby
- Wife: Janice Lee (until 2004); Cilla Brown (2005–2008)
- Sons: Greg Kelly
- Daughters: Leanne Battersby
- Adoptive sons: Chesney Brown
- Stepdaughters: Toyah Battersby; Fiz Brown
- Grandsons: Oliver Battersby; Joseph Brown (adoptive); Simon Barlow (adoptive); Aled Winter-Brown (adoptive); Bryn Winter-Brown (adoptive)
- Granddaughters: Carys Winter-Brown (adoptive); Llio Winter-Brown (adoptive)

Les Battersby (also Battersby-Brown) is a fictional character from the British ITV soap opera Coronation Street, who appeared from 1997 to 2007, played by Bruce Jones. The character is best known for his outspoken opinions and his following of English rock band Status Quo. In November 2024, Les was killed off off-screen.

== Creation and development ==
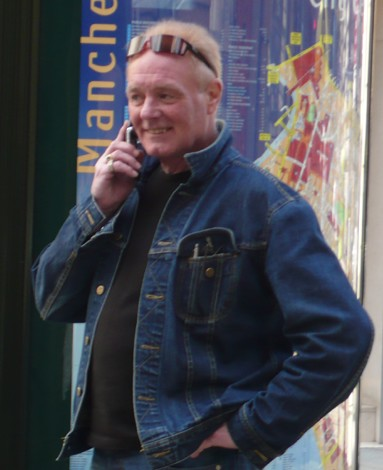
Bruce Jones (pictured) was suspended from the soap, due to allegations of inappropriate comments made to an undercover reporter.

In 1997, new executive producer Brian Park wanted to bring a tougher group into what he saw as a staid programme. The Battersbys were dubbed "the family from hell", and their bitter clashes with the established characters alienated a number of longtime fans. In the Battersby Family Album special, actor Bruce Jones recounted being in a pub after the episode where Les headbutted Curly Watts (Kevin Kennedy), and being seriously threatened if Les ever went near Curly again.

Jones was suspended from the show in March 2007, following Sunday newspaper allegations of drunkenness and inappropriate comments made in the presence of an undercover reporter. In May, it was confirmed that he would not return, and the character of Les would be written out later in the year.

In October 2024, it was announced that Les would be killed off-screen seventeen years following his final appearance.

== Storylines ==
The Battersbys arrive when No. 5 is bought by Weatherfield Council, and the Battersby family move in. Les had spent six months in Strangeways prison, for breaking and entering. He arrives with wife Janice (Vicky Entwistle), sixteen-year-old daughter Leanne (Jane Danson) (from a previous relationship with Stella Price (Michelle Collins)), and fifteen-year-old step-daughter Toyah (Georgia Taylor) (from Janice's previous relationship with Ronnie Clegg). Les immediately clashes with neighbours such as: Curly Watts (Kevin Kennedy) and Des Barnes (Philip Middlemiss). He enjoys wandering the interconnected loft spaces, to look around the homes of other residents, which scares the elderly Percy Sugden (Bill Waddington) into moving away.

Les' first big mistake comes at the end of 1997, where he buys an alive turkey for Christmas dinner. After calling it Theresa, Les says he'll slit the turkey's throat. But Toyah, and her vegetarian boyfriend Spider Nugent (Martin Hancock), decide to liberate the turkey. When Les swears he'll find it, he takes stepdaughter Toyah out for a drive in his car – but he doesn't notice the turkey walking right into the path of the car. After mowing down Theresa, Les comments later on, "This is champion turkey, this!", with Leanne saying, "I can't eat this, look, it's even got tyre marks on it!"

In 1998, Les' long-lost son Greg Kelly (Stephen Billington) turns up on his doorstep. Greg is born as the result of an affair between Les, and wealthy Moira Kelly, and Janice fears Les will want to hook up again with Moira. She is right, but Moira resists Les' brand of charm, and asks him to leave her home. He does, but is arrested for drink driving, and banned from driving for eighteen months. Janice throws him out of the house, upon learning he has been sleeping with other women and lied to her. Les is forced to live in a camper van, until Janice eventually comes around to him again. Greg, meanwhile, runs out of town after using Sally Webster (Sally Dynevor) for her money, and then beating her. Les hears cash is being offered for cobbles, but when he digs one up, he drops it on his toe. He makes life difficult for nurse Martin Platt (Sean Wilson) during his hospital visit, and steals drugs from the unlocked trolley. He overdoses and has to have his stomach pumped. He insists Martin tries to kill him, and Martin resigns when the hospital believes Les' word over his. After Janice learns that Les is planning to spend the compensation money on a holiday with Jackie Dobbs (Margi Clarke), she tells the hospital board Les has taken the medication of his own accord.

Toyah begins to receive English tuition from Ken Barlow (William Roache), as she wants to become a writer. Les thinks Ken is making a move on Toyah and headbutts him. Toyah, sickened by Les and Janice, runs away to London to find who she thinks is her real father Ronnie, Neil Flynn (Tim Dantay), who ties her up in his flat. Janice and Les pursue her to the big city and find her after she ran away from Flynn. Les continues to alienate Toyah, as he beats up her boyfriend, Spider, and Toyah leaves home. Les continues to be a problem, until Spider, who had begun working for the DSS, discovers Les is claiming benefits whilst working on the canal. Les is forced to leave Toyah and Spider alone. The DSS ultimately discover Les' duplicity without Spider's help, and Les is sentenced to 150 days community service, scrubbing graffiti. He teases Tyrone Dobbs (Alan Halsall) for being illiterate, so Tyrone gets revenge by spraying more graffiti each time Les cleans a wall, and when Les helps out at a local park, Tyrone removes his rowing boat so that Les is marooned on an island overnight.

Janice is disgusted with Les when he spends the money she saved for their electricity bill, on alcohol, and the power is cut off. During a holiday in Wales, a young man named Owen Williams makes a pass at Janice. She considers his offer, but when Les is electrocuted, she realises she couldn't cheat on him. Owen follows the family back to Weatherfield, and asks Janice to join him in Wales. Les beats him up, but Janice has had enough of Les; the final straw is when he gives her a deep freezer, for their anniversary.

Janice then meets Les' friend, Dennis Stringer (Charles Dale), in late-2001. When Dennis is thrown out of the pub ('The Chapter'), Dennis comes to live with the Battersbys. Janice, gets fed up of her husband Les' mellowed and good-tempered ways, and eventually leaves him for Dennis. Les attempts suicide by carbon monoxide poisoning in his car on New Year's Eve, and Dennis ends up rescuing him. When Dennis tries to get Les to hospital, they end up in a car crash. Dennis dies in the Intensive Care Unit of Weatherfield General Hospital on New Year's Day 2002, while Les survives with minor injuries.

In 2003, Janice falls in love with policeman Mick Hopwood (Ian Gain). This leads to an argument and a subsequent fight between Mick and Les, which Curly's police officer ex-wife, Emma, witnesses. Despite the fact that Mick had initiated the violence, he and Emma commit perjury in court, and cause Les to be wrongfully imprisoned for six months. Janice initially applaude Mick for his "honesty", only to leave him in disgust when the truth is revealed. But despite Les' appeals, she also refuses to take him back.

Les met Cilla Brown, (Wendi Peters) who works in a pub. In no time, Cilla and her young son Chesney (Sam Aston) move in with Les, much to Cilla's daughter Fiz's (Jennie McAlpine) disappointment, and Les and Chesney get on very well. In 2004, Cilla takes a six-week break, and dumps Chesney on Les, after a fiery row. In this time, he finally comes close to winning back his true love, Janice, after she decides to cancel their divorce proceedings to reunite with Les, but Cilla comes on the scene and lures him back with her larger bust, and by pretending to have come into money. Janice swears never to get involved with Les again, and divorces him. At this time, Cilla dramatises an incident, in which Rita Sullivan (Barbara Knox) clips Chesney round the ear for stealing sweets from the Kabin. Rita is ordered to pay compensation of £1,000, with Cilla promising to make her pay for what she did, and Cilla herself showing no mercy for Rita's age. However, Les feels bad for Rita, as they have been friends for years, and eventually persuades Cilla out of her scheme for £3,000. Around the same time, whilst on a night out with Steve McDonald (Simon Gregson), Les discovers his daughter, Leanne, lap-dancing in a nightclub; and brings her back to Weatherfield.

In 2005, Les dumps Chesney on the Croppers to jet off to Spain for six weeks. He comes back, but Chesney says he hates it at home and wants to go back to the Croppers. The couple then decide to get married for the "luxurious" presents they would receive from their guests. Les’ dream comes true when his favourite band, Status Quo, pops into the Rovers after a concert in the area. As he approaches the band with records for them to sign, they, in turn, thump him (as they recognised him as the lunatic who jumped on stage at a concert some twenty years previous, causing a permanent neck injury to lead singer Francis Rossi). He doesn't lose his faith in the Quo though, and doesn't anticipate that they would soon meet again. Cilla realises a way to make money from this, and tells a reluctant Les to contact his solicitor, in regards to suing the band for assault. In order to avoid the bad publicity, the band are eager to settle the case with Les quickly and quietly, but Cilla's dreams of riches were quickly dashed when accepting a cash offer, settled for the band to play at the wedding reception.

On her hen night, Cilla finds a younger bloke on her last night of freedom, but is interrupted by a drunk Les coming home, and she passes the man off as her older son, Billy, who has turned up for the wedding. Les is too drunk to say anything and falls asleep, while the man runs off in disgust. The real Billy turns up on the morning of her wedding and Les is baffled as he does not recognise this man, but Billy successfully convinces Les that he was too drunk to remember what Billy looked like. Les and Cilla finally arrange their wedding day, despite the fact that the priest was a de-frocked clergyman, and they have to distract the real vicar while they "marry." Cilla smashes Tracy Barlow's (Kate Ford) window (due to the fact that she wouldn't hand over the bouquet of flowers for the ceremony because Cilla wouldn't pay up) and then runs to Dev Alahan’s (Jimmi Harkishin) shop and steals some flowers, before jumping into the wedding car, and heading towards the church. Les is driving and is distracted by seeing a member of Status Quo, resulting in him crashing into the Status Quo van (which had the other band members inside).

Les puts on a neck brace before "tying the knot" with Cilla, and they become known as Mr & Mrs. Battersby-Brown. The Quo turn up at a back room in the reception (where the presents were being kept) to rest. Les walks in, and tells his idols that his dream is to trash a room with expensive things in. He duly wrecks everything, and throws a wedding-present TV out of the window as Cilla walks in to inform him that he has just trashed the presents. She goes berserk, and starts attacking Les as the Quo watch in bursts of laughter, and the reception ends with the band agreeing to put past differences with Les behind, performing "Rockin’ All Over the World" with Les as a member of the band. Cilla then goes on the honeymoon with her friend, Yana Lumb (Jayne Bickerton), instead of Les.

Surprisingly, it is only Les that had affairs in the marriage, the first time with his ex-wife, Janice, during a drunken one-night stand; Cilla shows Les mercy, despite giving him a hard time initially, but forgives him. The second time is when Les suspects Cilla of cheating (when she was not). Cilla's best friend, Yana Lumb takes pity on Les and shows anger at the absent Cilla, who didn't ever confide in her. Yana and Les sleep together, only for Cilla's son Chesney to catch them. Cilla soon finds out and pretends to have cancer to make Les feel guilty. Cilla gets Les and Yana to get into a bathtub full of mushy peas in the cold wind out on the street, raising £600. Cilla uses the money for a holiday and leaves Les behind. Cilla reveals that she lied about the cancer. Eventually, she, Les and Chesney begin living together. After much grovelling, Cilla forgives Les and smacks Yana on the face, but also forgives her. A few days later, Les and Cilla make the marriage legal, by registering at a local registry office. Les is last seen on 6 May 2007 when he is talking to Steve McDonald, and Jamie Baldwin (Rupert Hill) at the Street Cars office.

Chesney is close to Les, and struggles to cope with his absence. Les has not been seen since, but has been mentioned, and sometimes Chesney would phone him. Les lives in Dublin, owing to his roadie job with the Irish tribute band, but he is referred to as being still alive and well. In 2008, Chesney receives a letter from Les stating he has dropped the "Brown" part from his surname, implying he has divorced Cilla.

In 2014, his divorced ex-wife Cilla, who then lived in Wolverhampton, mentions that she was no longer in contact with Les.

In the episode broadcast on 8 January 2018, Chesney says to his fiancée, Sinead Tinker, that neither Les nor his mother, Cilla, can make it to their wedding.

On 29 November 2024, Les is killed off screen in what is described as a workplace accident.

== Reception ==
In Dorothy Catherine Anger's book Other worlds: society seen through soap opera she brands Les as one of the "middle aged men" who "over the years have, stymied their wives' efforts to be accepted as respectable".
