= Melanie Kilburn =

English actress

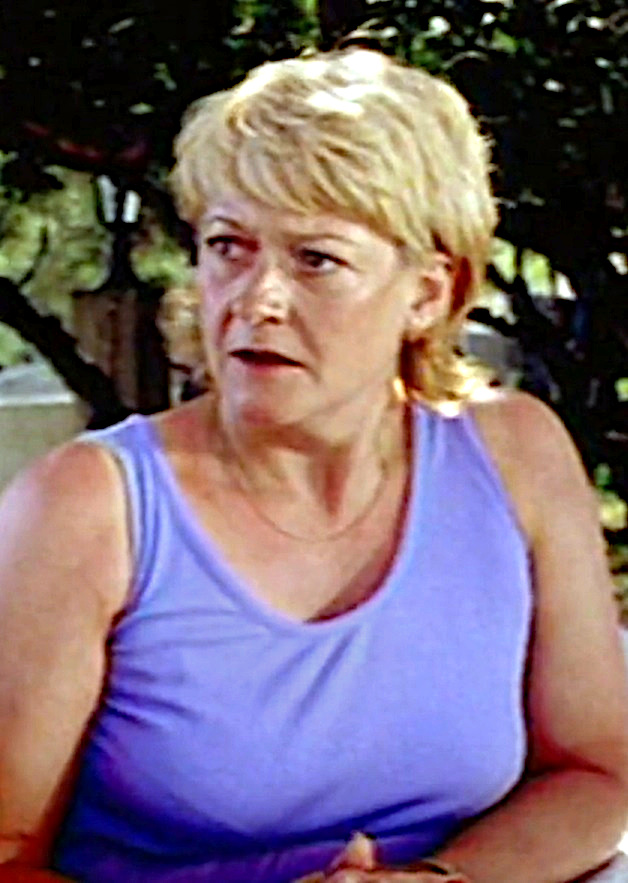
- Kilburn in Carla 2003
- Born: Sarah Melanie Jean Kilburn; Bradford, West Riding of Yorkshire, England
- Education: Bradford Girls' Grammar School; Guildhall School of Music and Drama
- Occupation: Actress

Sarah Melanie Jean Kilburn is an English actress, known for portraying the role of Laura Bryant in the ITV police drama series The Bill. She also played the part of Sandra Conway, widow of Ch Insp Derek Conway, in earlier episodes of The Bill. Her career began in 1983 when she starred as Maureen in The Company Car. She was in an episode of Casualty in 1990 (series 5). She played Eve Sykes in Coronation Street in 2000.

Kilburn rose to prominence as Jill in three series of the BBC's Making Out, and as Carol Anderson in Soldier Soldier.

She also appeared in Heartbeat as Rosie Tinniswood over two episodes in 1993 and 1995.

Kilburn also starred as Sandra in Where the Heart Is throughout 1999, and played the regular role of Liz in Peak Practice during the series that aired in 2000.

In 2017, she starred as in God's Own Country, alongside Josh O'Connor and Ian Hart. In 2019, Kilburn started in an episode of Brassic. In 2020, she started in the reboot of All Creatures Great and Small.

From 2017 to 2018, and again since 2022, Kilburn has appeared as the Reverend Irene Mills in the BBC soap opera EastEnders. In 2021, she appeared in an episode of the BBC soap opera Doctors as Mavis Gregg.
