= Oliver Holt =

English sports journalist

Oliver T Holt
- Born: Oliver Charles Thomas Holt; 22 May 1966 (age 60); Manchester, England
- Occupations: Author, journalist
- Children: 3
- Relatives: Thomas Holt (father); Eileen Derbyshire (mother)
- Writing career
- Subject: Sports

Oliver Charles Thomas Holt (born 22 May 1966) is an English sports journalist who writes for the Daily Mail and The Sunday Mail in the United Kingdom. He is the only son of Thomas Holt and Coronation Street actress Eileen Derbyshire.

He attended the King's School, Macclesfield from 1977 to 1984. He then read history at Christ Church, Oxford, before studying newspaper journalism at the Cardiff School of Journalism. He started his journalistic career at the Liverpool Echo, and after three years moved to The Times as Motor Racing Correspondent in 1993. He graduated to Chief Football Writer in 1996 in time to cover England's hosting of the Euro Championships that summer, and then to Chief Sports Correspondent in 2000. Highlights of his time at The Times was covering the 1998 FIFA World Cup and the 2000 Summer Olympics.

He joined the Daily Mirror in 2002 as the Chief Sports Writer, where he has covered many notable sports events. He left the paper in February 2015, to replace Patrick Collins at The Mail on Sunday. Holt was also a regular guest on the Sunday Supplement. He is an avid Stockport County supporter.

On 13 February 2023, Holt was appointed the first seven day Chief Sports Writer for both the Daily Mail and The Mail on Sunday.

== Awards ==
- 2004 the What the Papers Say Best Sports Writer award
- 2005 Sports Writer of the Year
- 2006 Sports Journalist of the Year

== Bibliography ==
- Behind the Scenes with Benetton Formula 1 (1995) with Chris Bennett
- The Bridge: Behind the Scenes at Chelsea (1998) with Jon Nicholson
- If You're Second You Are Nothing: Ferguson and Shankly (2006)

As Ghost Writer:

- Stan: Tackling My Demons by Stan Collymore (2004)
- Left Field by Graeme Le Saux (2007)
- Made in Sheffield – My Story by Neil Warnock (2007)
