= Jack Deam =

English actor

- Born: Ian Deam; 29 June 1972 (age 53); Oldham, Lancashire, England
- Occupation: Actor
- Years active: 1989–present

Jack Deam (born Ian Deam; 29 June 1972) is an English actor. He used his grandfather's name for his stage name. His most notable performances have been as Marty Fisher in Channel 4 dramedy Shameless, DC Ken Blackstone in the ITV crime drama DCI Banks, and Inspector Mallory in the BBC detective series Father Brown.

== Career ==
In 1990, Deam appeared in the Granada TV soap opera Families, a show about two families, one from Cheshire, the other in Australia, notably alongside Jude Law.

In 1992, he appeared in a few episodes of Heartbeat as Alan Maskell and returned to the series in 2004 as Jake Clarke. He also appeared in the TV mini series The Life and Times of Henry Pratt. He played the lead role as older Henry Pratt, whilst little Henry Pratt was played by Andrew Nicholson and young Henry Pratt was played by Bryan Dick.

In 1993, he played Vinnie, a young soldier in the King's Fusiliers in the award-winning British drama Soldier Soldier. He later joined the cast of Clocking Off, written by Paul Abbott, playing Kev Leach from series 1–4.

In 1996, he briefly appeared as a policeman in Jimmy McGovern's one-off drama for ITV Hillsborough, based on the 1989 Hillsborough disaster.

In 1999, he appeared in an episode of Queer As Folk, as a Doctor Who-obsessed fan, and had a one-night stand with Vince, one of the protagonists, before taking the role of Toyah Battersby's (Georgia Taylor) rapist Phil Simmonds on the long-running ITV soap opera Coronation Street in 2000.

In 2004, Deam played Detective Sergeant Hanken in "In Pursuit of the Proper Sinner", an episode of The Inspector Lynley Mysteries

In January 2007, he took part in The Afternoon Play, a daytime BBC drama series consisting of short stories.

From 2010 to 2016, he played the part of a detective constable in the DCI Banks series.

He played Walter in the 2011 TV series 32 Brinkburn Street. 2014 saw Deam in a play called Blindsided, by Simon Stephens, at the Royal Exchange, Manchester, alongside ex-Coronation Street Julie Hesmondhalgh (Hayley Cropper).

He appeared in an episode of New Tricks as a suspect in a cold case enquiry.

Starting with its fourth series in 2016, Deam appeared as Inspector Mallory in BBC's Father Brown.

In December 2019, he appeared as Leonard Wooley in Agatha and the Curse of Ishtar, a fictionalized account of how Agatha Christie met Max Mallowan, who later became her second husband.

In September 2021, he appeared as Frank Johnson in Silent Witness on BBC One.

== Filmography ==
Year	Title	Role	Notes
1989	ScreenPlay	Robert	Episode: "A Small Mourning"
1991	Casualty	Lee	Episode: "Humpty Dumpty"
1991	Let Him Have It	Terry Stringer	
1993	Screen One	Richard	Episode: "The Bullion Boys"
1995	The Young Poisoner's Handbook	Mick	
1995	Pie in the Sky	Jez Leigh	Episode: "Dead Right"
1997	Peak Practice	Joey Cox	Episode: "Classics"
1998	Where the Heart Is	Sam Woodford	Episode: "She Goes On"
1999	Heart	Policeman	
2000	Holby City	Matt Trayling	Episode: "The Real Thing"
2004	Dalziel and Pascoe	Charlie Walker	Episode: "Great Escapes"
2004	The Inspector Lynley Mysteries	Detective Sergeant Hanken	Episode: "In Pursuit of the Proper Sinner"
2004–2007, 2011–2013	Shameless	Marty Fisher	
2005	Silent Witness	Carl Dawson	Episode: "Ghosts"
2006	London to Brighton	Paul	Uncredited
2007	The Royal	Sam	Episode: "Laura"
2007	The Afternoon Play	Chris	Episode: "Come Fly With Me"
2007	Casualty	Corporal Hobbs	Episode: "Core Values"
2010	Casualty	Danny Robertson	Episode: "Past Lives"
2010–2016	DCI Banks	DC Ken Blackstone	32 episodes
2014	Inspector George Gently	Billy Shearer	Episode: "Gently Going Under"
2015	Casualty	Gary Bess	Episode: "Dark Horses"
2015	New Tricks	Terry	Episode: "Lottery Curse"
2016–2022	Father Brown	Inspector Mallory	64 episodes
2019	Agatha and the Curse of Ishtar	Leonard Woolley	
2021	Silent Witness	Frank Johnson	Episode: "Bad Love"
2022	Ridley	Duncan Darwin	Episode: "Swansong"
2023	Vera	Robert Falstone	Episode: "The Darkest Evening"
2023	The Long Shadow	DI Les Hanley	
2025	Maigret	Inspector Foulon	
