= Scott Wright (actor) =

British actor

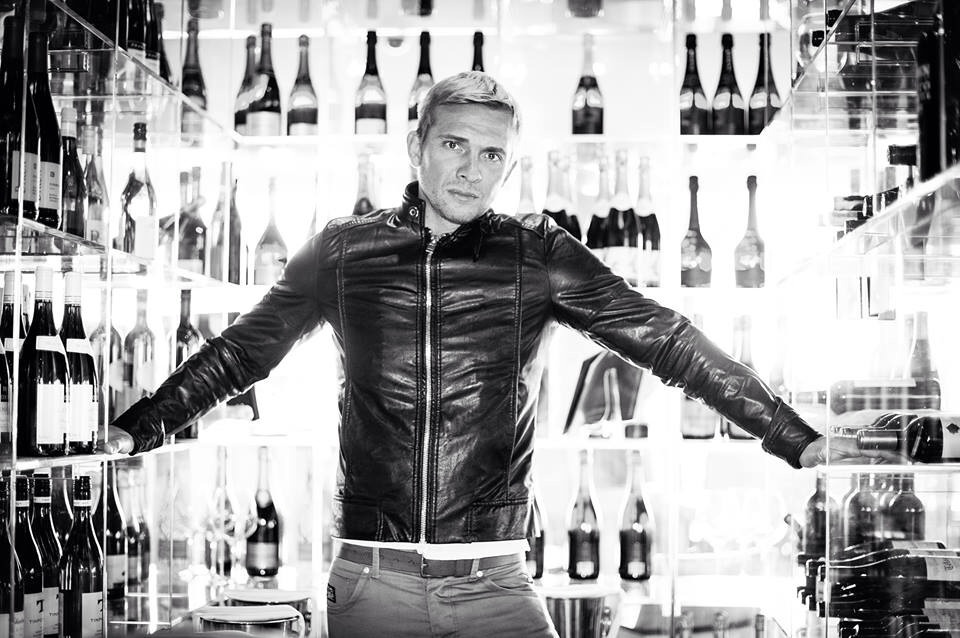
- Wright in 2014
- Born: Ashton-under-Lyne, Greater Manchester, England
- Occupations: Actor; singer; Musician DJ/Presenter
- Years active: 1995–present
- Spouse: Kate Linsell (m. 2007–2011)
- Children: Lexi Wright

Scott Wright is an English actor, singer and musician. He was nominated for a National Television Award in 2001 for Most Popular Newcomer for his role as Sam Kingston in Coronation Street.

== Career ==
Wright had a three-year stay in ITV's Coronation Street, where he was nominated for a National Television award for his role as Sam Kingston. Wright's other acting credits on television include ITV's Crossroads and BBC One's Casualty. Added to this he played the title role in Tristan in the Merlin International films production. Wright has also appeared in ITV's Emmerdale and Channel 4's Shameless and ITV1's Midwinter of the Spirit, playing Anna Maxwell Martins’ husband Sean Watkins. It also starred David Threlfall. In 2016 Wright played Jordan Dawkins in a national tour of The Shawshank Redemption for Bill Kenwright. It was reported in 2018 Wright was filming a television pilot called Two Wolves also starring Sir Derek Jacobi, James Cosmo and Emmy award-winning American actress Dove Cameron. In November 2020, he appeared in an episode of the BBC soap opera Doctors as Scott Keane.

As a musician Wright has worked with numerous international multimillion selling artists including Alexander O Neil, Martha Reaves, David Cassidy, Candi Staton and Jordan Knight.

In 2002 Wright was awarded the title of Rear of the Year with singer Charlotte Church.

In 2023 Wright produced and took the Title role in feature film The Stoic alongside Jason Flemyng (Snatch, The Curious Case of Benjamin Button)and Bruce Payne (Passenger 57, Dungeons and Dragons)

== Filmography ==
Television

Production	Role	Company
Casualty	Gerry Lomas	BBC 1
Shameless	Bradford	Channel 4
Emmerdale	Gary Dench	Yorkshire Television
Doctors	Ralph Jones	BBC
Crossroads	Jeff Larson	Carlton Television
Coronation Street	Sam Kingston	Granada Television
Hidden Love	Trevor	Channel 4
Emmerdale	Brian	Yorkshire Television
Midwinter of the Spirit	Sean Watkins	ITV

Theatre

Production	Role	Company
Shady Business	Jerry	Talking Scarlett Productions
Out of Order	Ronnie	I Dickens Productions
Dancing at Lunasa	Gerry	Partington
Dean Guilty	Gary	Partington
Communicating Doors	Reece	
The Crucible	Rev Hale	BLT Co
Aladdin (Arabian Nights)	Aladdin	Pele Productions
Cinderella	Prince	Qdos Entertainment
The Shawshank Redemption	Jordan Dawkins	Bill Kenwright Productions

Film

Production	Role	Company
Tristan	Tristan	Merlin Films
Restraint	Phil	
Manchester Lads	Johnson	Ozenburg Films
The Domino Effect	Agent Taylor	Mirror Image
Gobsmacked	Tash	Narnia Productions
Interrogation	D.I. Harris	Mirror Image

Presenting

Production	Company
Central Radio Presenter	Central Radio 106.5 FM – Preston
Wright Hand Drive	Granada Television
Safety on the Railways	Railtrack
Breakfast Show Co-host	BBC Radio Lancashire
Rovers Return Quiz Night	ITV Play
This Morning Puzzle Book	ITV Play
