= Charles Dale =

Welsh actor

- Born: 4 February 1963 (age 63); Tenby, Pembrokeshire, Wales
- Occupation: Actor
- Notable work: Casualty

Charles Dale (born 4 February 1963) is a Welsh actor known for playing Big Mac in Casualty, Dennis Stringer in Coronation Street, Gary "Chef" Alcock in The Lakes, and Clive Eustace in The Eustace Bros. He was born in Tenby, Pembrokeshire, Wales.

== Career ==
=== Television ===
From November 2007 until June 2016, Dale portrayed Big Mac, a hospital porter, an Emergency Care Assistant and a Healthcare Assistant in the BBC One series Casualty.

He played Steve Lewis in the BBC Wales series Belonging (1999-2009).

He has also made appearances in Lovejoy, Soldier Soldier, Bramwell, A Touch of Frost, Touching Evil III, The Bill, At Home with the Braithwaites, Burnside, Steel River Blues, New Tricks, Where the Heart Is, Holby City, Spaced, Rocket Man, The Pembrokeshire Murders, Unforgotten and Emmerdale.

=== Theatre ===
In 2017, Dale played Hugo in the musical Everybody's Talking About Jamie at the Crucible Theatre.

== Filmography ==
=== Film ===
Year	Title	Role	Notes
1979	Exits	Digger	
1993	The Hour of the Pig	First Witness	
1993	Genghis Cohn	Herr Heller	
1999	Animal Farm	Moses / Pincher the Rottweiler	Television film, Voice only
2000	Skin Deep	Hunter	Television film
2000	Secret Society	Paul	
2008	Domestic Flight	Barry	Short film
2009	A Bit of Tom Jones?	Factory Foreman	
2013	The List	Richard van Meeren	
2015	The Real Mamils		Television film
2017	Another Man's Shoes	Charlie	Short film
2023	Linda	Post Office Manager	Short film
2024	Frankenstein: Legacy	Bob	

=== Television ===
Year	Title	Role	Notes
1984	Danger: Marmalade At Work	Male Nurse / Sailor / Burglar	Recurring role; 3 episodes
1984	Big Deal	Policeman	Episode: "A Ragged Run"
1984	Morgan's Boy	Gareth Price	Recurring role; 4 episodes
1985	Summer Season	Gareth / George	Recurring role; 2 episodes
1985	Ties of Blood	Soldier	Episode: "Out of Time"
1991	The War of the Roses	Lord Willoughby / Ned Poins / Le Far / Vernon / Young Clifford / Earl of Richmond	Miniseries; 7 episodes
1992	Lovejoy	D.S. Redston	Episode: "Benin Bronze"
1992	Van der Valk	Simon Plesman	Episode: "Still Waters"
1992	Screen Two	Ambulance Driver	Episode: "The Last Romantics"
1992	A Touch of Frost	Colin Fletcher	Episode: "Not With Kindness"
1995	Casualty	Phil Tully	Episode: "Out of Time"
1995	The Bill	Don Collyer	Episode: "Lockdown"
1996	Bramwell	Duncan	Episode: "The Rule of Thuggery"
1996	Testament: The Bible in Animation	Sailor / Ninevite	Episode: "Jonah"
1997	The Bill	Miles Cooper	Episode: "In the Dark"
1997	The Famous Five	Police Inspector	Episode: "Five Go Off in a Caravan"
1997–1999	The Lakes	Gary Alcock	Series regular; 14 episodes
1998	Out of Hours	Welby	Episode: "Episode 5"
1999	Casualty	Billy Traynor	Episode: "Crazy Love"
1999	Touching Evil	DCI Wheelan	Episode: "Innocent"
1999	Spaced	Security Guard	Episode: "Chaos"
2000	Where the Heart Is	Colin	Episode: "Friends in Need"
2000	At Home with the Braithwaites	McGuire	Recurring role; 4 episodes
2000	Clarkson's Car Years	Pub Actor	Episode: "The New Romantics"
2000	Burnside	Billy Holden	Episode: "Back with a Vengeance"
2000–2002	Coronation Street	Dennis Stringer	Series regular; 167 episodes
2002–2003	The Eustace Bros.	Clive Eustace	Series regular; 12 episodes
2003	Casualty	Larry Steadman	Episode: "Flash in the Pan"
2003	The Bill	Mark Wilson	Episode: "Better Late Than Never"
2004	Steel River Blues	George Barnes	Series regular; 7 episodes
2004	Conviction	Malcolm Waters	Episode: "Episode 4"
2004–2006	Barking!	Greg	Series regular; 20 episodes
2005	The Last Detective	Craig Thorn	Episode: "Towpaths of Glory"
2005	Rocket Man	Barney Scott	Miniseries; 6 episodes
2006	Holby City	George Allen	Episode: "Looking After Number One"
2006	Judge John Deed	P.O. Dave Spearson	Episode: "Hard Gating"
2006	Thin Ice	Rocky	Miniseries
2006	New Tricks	Stephen Murray	Episode: "Lady's Pleasure"
2006	The Street	Steve	Episode: "Stan"
2006	Where the Heart Is	Brian	Episode: "Flesh and Blood"
2006	Ancient Rome: The Rise and Fall of an Empire	Maxentius	Episode: "Constantine"
2006	Vincent	Leo Harvey	Episode: "Soldiers of a False Army"
2006	Robin Hood	Lucky George	Episode: "Brothers in Arms"
2006, 2009	Belonging	Steve Lewis	Recurring role; 2 episodes
2007	The Royal	DS Slingsby	Recurring role; 3 episodes
2007–2021	Casualty	Big Mac	Series regular; 354 episodes
2012	Holby City	Big Mac	Episode: "Unsafe Haven: Part Two"
2012	Made in Wales	Mr. Griffith	Episode: "Buddha Boy"
2016	Moving On	Roy	Episode: "Zero"
2017	Grantchester	Cyril Parker	Episode: "Series 3, Episode 3"
2017	Armchair Detectives	Bob Tanzer	Episode: "Watercolour Crime"
2018	Kiri	Alan	Episode: "Episode 3"
2018	Requiem	Royce Evans	Miniseries; 6 episodes
2018	Doctors	Dennis Wallace	Episode: "In Plain Sight"
2021	The Pembrokeshire Murders	DS Gareth Rees	Miniseries; 3 episodes
2021	Unforgotten	Chief Constable Robin	Recurring role; 4 episodes
2022	Rules of the Game	Brian Weston	Miniseries; 2 episodes
2022	Shakespeare & Hathaway: Private Investigators	Jacob Tark	Episode: "If It Be Man's Work"
2022	Sherwood	Leonard Gibson	Recurring role; 4 episodes
2023	Midsomer Murders	Gideon Blundell	Episode: "The Devil's Work"
2024	Emmerdale	Juror	Episode: "19/12/24"
2026	Death Valley	Terry Daniels	Series 2, Episode 6
2026	Living the Dream		

=== Video games ===
Year	Show	Voice role	Notes
2020	Assassin's Creed Valhalla		
2022	Elden Ring	Preceptor Seluvis	
2022	Xenoblade Chronicles 3	V	
