= Eileen Derbyshire =

English actress (born 1931)

Eileen Derbyshire MBE
- Born: Eileen Derbyshire; 6 October 1931 (age 95); Urmston, Lancashire, England
- Education: Northern School of Music, Royal Academy of Music
- Occupation: Actress
- Years active: 1948–2019
- Known for: Coronation Street (1961–2016, 2019)
- Spouse: Thomas Holt (m. 1965; died 2021)
- Children: Oliver Holt

Eileen Derbyshire (born 6 October 1931) is a retired English actress, best known for her role as Emily Bishop in the long-running ITV soap opera Coronation Street. She played the character for 55 years from January 1961 to January 2016 (with a brief cameo in October 2019), making her the longest-serving female cast member in a British TV soap opera. She was appointed an MBE in the 2010 Queen's Birthday Honours list for her long acting career.

== Early life ==
Derbyshire was born in 1931 in Urmston, Lancashire. From the age of 17, she was appearing in plays broadcast on radio. After several small parts on television, she joined the cast of Coronation Street, first appearing as Miss Nugent in episode 15 in January 1961 (the character appeared as an extra in episode 4 in December 1960 played by an uncredited walk-on actress). The character was then given the forename Emily in 1962.

== Career ==
Derbyshire has a degree in teaching, trained at the Northern School of Music, and passed her examination at the Royal Academy of Music. She began teaching speech and drama, but had always wanted to act. While on the bus one day, she passed Chorlton Repertory Theatre, where she asked for an audition. She was enrolled as a student, and later became assistant stage manager. From there she joined Century Theatre's mobile touring company, and appeared in theatre all over the country.

Derbyshire left Coronation Street for personal reasons in December 2015. Her departure aired on 1 January 2016, then described as a sabbatical. She returned for a cameo appearance as part of the on-screen celebrations for long-standing character Ken Barlow's 80th birthday in October 2019, being seen on a video call.

== Personal life ==
Derbyshire married engineer Thomas Holt in 1965 and the following year they had a son, Oliver. The couple had a cottage in Cheshire. Derbyshire's interests include opera, reading, going to concerts and holidaying in Vienna and Venice. Thomas Holt died in February 2021 and in 2024 Derbyshire moved into Denville Hall, a retirement home for actors.

Derbyshire has a reputation for reclusiveness. She has never joined fellow cast members at awards ceremonies or other events and did not appear in any of the publicity videos on the Coronation Street website. She has only twice appeared on screen out of character: firstly, in 1988, she gave a rare interview in a documentary tribute to cast member and good friend Margot Bryant, who played Minnie Caldwell. In 2005, she gave an interview for an ITV programme aimed at deaf viewers, speaking about working with the deaf actor Ali Briggs, who was playing Emily's niece Freda Burgess, for which she was interviewed on the set and dressed in character. She also appeared, along with the rest of the Coronation Street cast, in episodes of This Is Your Life for Patricia Phoenix in 1972, Jack Howarth in 1974, Julie Goodyear in 1980, William Roache in 1985 and Anne Kirkbride in 1998. Her son has denied that Derbyshire is reclusive, pointing out she is simply "private, and one of the last of a dying breed of old-fashioned actresses who do it for the love of acting, not for all the attendant publicity".

Derbyshire has three grandchildren. She is also godmother to three of actor William Roache's children and Barbara Knox's daughter Maxine.

== Honours ==
Derbyshire was appointed a Member of the Order of the British Empire (MBE) in the 2010 Birthday Honours for services to drama. Both she and fellow actress Barbara Knox were awarded their honours by Queen Elizabeth II during an investiture ceremony at Buckingham Palace.
