= Vicky Entwistle =

English actress (born 1968)

- Born: Victoria Entwistle; 15 September 1968 (age 58); Accrington, Lancashire, England
- Occupation: Actress
- Years active: 1996–present
- Known for: Role of Janice Battersby in Coronation Street
- Television: Coronation Street (1997–2011); Celebrity Big Brother (2013); Ackley Bridge (2018)
- Spouse: Steven Chapman (m. 2008)

Victoria Entwistle (born 15 September 1968) is an English actress. She is known for playing Janice Battersby in the ITV soap opera Coronation Street.

== Early life ==
Entwistle grew up in Accrington; her father owned a newsagent's in Clayton-le-Moors. She attended Rhyddings High School in Oswaldtwistle, and at the age of sixteen, she commuted to Blackpool to study drama, whilst working nights at a local supermarket. For some time, she worked as a Bluecoat entertainer at Pontin's in Devon before she won a scholarship to attend Drama Centre London, from which she graduated in 1991.

== Career ==
Entwistle returned to the stage as Hanna in Merlin before gaining the role of Amy in BBC's Our Tune. Entwistle then played Maxine Graham in Like A Virgin, and was spotted by Granada Television casting director Judy Hayfield. She was offered the role of machinist Janice Lee in Coronation Street and made her on-screen debut on 6 January 1997. She also starred in an episode of The Bill in 1997. The following month, Entwistle was told that she would be playing the mother of the Battersbys.

On 2 August 2010, Entwistle's departure after fourteen years on the show was confirmed. Soap bosses said the actress "agonised" over her decision, but decided the show's fiftieth anniversary year was the right time to say goodbye.

Since leaving Coronation Street, Entwistle has worked on the stage. She starred as the Wicked Queen in Blackpool's 2011 production of Snow White and the Seven Dwarves and in 2012 toured in Funny Peculiar, an award-winning play by Mike Stott, with Suzanne Shaw, Craig Gazey, Dominic Cazenove and Gemma Bissix.

From January to August 2013, she played the role of Madame Thénardier in Les Misérables on the West End.

On 22 August 2013, Vicky entered the Celebrity Big Brother house alongside former on-screen husband Bruce Jones to compete in the twelfth series. She was paid £150,000.

From 13 December 2017 until 7 January 2018, Entwistle appeared in the Christmas pantomime Sleeping Beauty at the Pavilion Theatre in Rhyl, North Wales. She played the character Carrabosse, which she also played in a Llandudno pantomime in 2013.

== Personal life ==
In January 2001, Entwistle was arrested after allegedly head-butting a fan of Coronation Street. The charges against her were dropped.

== Filmography ==
Year	Title	Role	Notes
1997–2011	Coronation Street	Janice Battersby	Series regular; 1557 episodes
1997	The Bill	Sophie Edghill	Episode: "A Policeman's Lot"
1999	Coronation Street: Through the Keyhole	Janice Battersby	Coronation Street spin-off
2013	Celebrity Big Brother	Herself	26 episodes
2013	Big Brother's Bit on the Side	Herself	17 episodes
2017	Father Brown	Frances Whittaker	Episode: "The Eagle and The Daw"
2018	Ackley Bridge	Sandra Turner	Recurring role; 2 episodes
2019	Holby City	Sandra Jackson	Episode: "Sandra's Choice"

=== Stage ===
- The Importance of Being Earnest as Miss Prism (2019, Octagon Theatre, Bolton)
