= List of Coronation Street characters introduced in 1998 =

The following is a list of characters that first appeared in the ITV soap opera Coronation Street in 1998, by order of first appearance.

== Maggie Veitch ==
Maggie Veitch
- Coronation Street character
- Portrayed by: Susan Tordoff
- First appearance: 29 March 1998
- Last appearance: 17 April 1998
- Introduced by: Brian Park
In-universe information
- Occupation: Prison Warder

Maggie Veitch (also known as Warder Veitch), portrayed by Susan Tordoff, was a prison guard who bullied Deirdre Rachid (Anne Kirkbride). Her despicable acts were putting Deirdre in an asylum and not informing her of a phone call from her good friend Mike Baldwin (Johnny Briggs). Eventually, Deirdre's prison mate Jackie Dobbs (Margi Clarke) stood up for Deirdre by punching Veitch in the stomach on her behalf. After that, Veitch wasn't cruel to Deirdre.

== Hayley Cropper ==
Hayley Anne Cropper (also Patterson) made her first appearance on 26 January 1998, played by Julie Hesmondhalgh. She is the first transsexual character in a British soap opera and was the first permanent transsexual character in the world of soaps. She is probably best known for her marriage to Roy Cropper (David Neilson). On 11 January 2013, Hesmondhalgh announced she had decided to quit Coronation Street, and she filmed her final scenes on 18 November 2013. Hayley's exit storyline saw her take her own life after being diagnosed with terminal pancreatic cancer. Her final appearance was aired on 22 January 2014. Hesmondhalgh has insisted that it was not a "right to die" storyline.

== Morgan Middleton ==
Morgan Middleton
- Coronation Street character
- Portrayed by: Connor Chatburn (1998); Corey Weekes (2019)
- Duration: 1998, 2019
- First appearance: 2 February 1998
- Last appearance: 29 November 2019
- Introduced by: Brian Park (1998); Iain MacLeod (2019)
In-universe information
- Father: Alan McKenna
- Mother: Fiona Middleton
- Stepfather: John Brooker
- Half-sisters: Emma Brooker
- Grandfathers: Clive Middleton
- Grandmothers: Pam Middleton
- Uncles: Lee Middleton

Morgan Middleton, played by Connor Chatburn, is the son of Alan McKenna and Fiona Middleton. His first appearance was during the episode broadcast on 2 February 1998. When Connor's mother Katrina was pregnant, her mother joked that she looked like Angela Griffin who plays Fiona. She contacted Coronation Street makers with the offer of having her son play Morgan following his birth. They accepted and two weeks after his birth Connor was on set playing the character. In 2019, The character was reintroduced to the series with Corey Weeks taking on the role.

Fiona has a drunken one night stand with Jim McDonald, father of her ex-boyfriend, Steve. Her fling with Jim is revealed on her wedding day as Jim was worried that he was the father of the baby Fiona was expecting. Alan is so angry that he leaves Fiona and refuses to have anything to do with her or the baby, despite medical tests proving that he is Morgan's father. Steve is disgusted with Jim and gets back together with Fiona so he can help her bring Morgan up.

While Zoe Tattersall grieves over the death of her baby daughter, Shannon, she kidnaps Morgan and goes to the canal, intending to jump with him. However, she gives Morgan to a policeman, but panics and falls into the canal. However, Gary Mallett rescues her. Fiona is furious at Zoe for kidnapping Morgan and decides to press charges, much to the anger of Zoe's then good friend, Ashley Peacock. When Fiona and Steve's relationship breaks down, Morgan and his mother leave Weatherfield.

More than 20 years later, Morgan attends the funeral of his stepfather, John Brooker (Noel White). When Morgan's half-sister, Emma (Alexandra Mardell) learns that John was not her biological father, Morgan admits he knew this and as a result is banished from the funeral by an angry Emma. Morgan returns three months later and meets with Emma and asks her if she will be joining him and Fiona in Melbourne for Christmas. Emma tells him that she wants to remain in Weatherfield with her biological father, Steve and her half-sister Amy Barlow for the festive season and will visit Fiona in the New Year.

== Log Thwaite ==
Log Thwaite
- Coronation Street character
- Portrayed by: Zoë Henry
- First appearance: 11 March 1998
- Last appearance: 22 March 1998
- Introduced by: Brian Park

Log Thwaite was the eco-warrior girlfriend of Spider Nugent. She returns from South America having tracked Spider down and temporarily moves into Emily Bishop's home at No. 3 Coronation Street with Spider but a jealous Toyah Battersby drives them apart. Toyah allows Spider to catch Log eating a bacon sandwich she had prepared for Log, angering Spider who thinks that she is betraying her vegan principles.

Log was portrayed by Zoë Henry, who later returned to Coronation Street to portray Casey Carswell in 2007.

== Jackie Dobbs ==
Jacqueline "Jackie" Dobbs is a fictional character from the long-running soap opera Coronation Street. She made her first appearance on 29 March 1998, and was played by Margi Clarke. Jackie is the mother of Tyrone Dobbs (Alan Halsall), and was originally introduced as the cellmate of Deirdre Barlow (Anne Kirkbride). The character left in 1999, but returned again in 2008. Jackie then left again in 2009, before returning for the last time in 2010. She made her final appearance on 18 March 2010.

== Greg Kelly ==
Greg Kelly
- Coronation Street character
- Portrayed by: Stephen Billington
- Duration: 1998–1999
- First appearance: 1 April 1998
- Last appearance: 16 May 1999
- Introduced by: Brian Park
In-universe information
- Father: Les Battersby
- Mother: Moira Kelly
- Stepfather: Harry Wood
- Half-brothers: Chesney Brown (adoptive)
- Half-sisters: Leanne Battersby
- Grandmothers: Betty Battersby
- Aunts: Josie Battersby
- Nephews: Simon Barlow (adoptive); Oliver Battersby; Joseph Brown (adoptive); Aled Brown (adoptive); Bryn Brown (adoptive)
- Nieces: Carys Brown (adoptive); Llio Brown (adoptive)

Gregory Paul "Greg" Kelly was played by Stephen Billington. Greg was the long-lost son of Les Battersby and is best known for his ultimately abusive relationship with Sally Webster. In 2013, Billington reflected on the role, saying, "Greg was an amazing character to play, so I have no regrets about that whatsoever. I won the Soap Award for 'Villain of the Year' for the role and we were getting 26 million viewers an episode, which could never be repeated now with so many channels. It was tremendous to be part of that".

Greg was the result of a holiday romance between Moira Kelly and Les Battersby when he was working on a travelling fairground on the Isle of Wight. Les never kept in touch and it was not until Greg turned up in Weatherfield in April 1998 that Les even knew he had a son. Greg's early years were hard, but when he was around two, his mother started working for Harry Wood whom she subsequently married and he brought Greg up as his own. Moira told Greg about his past when he was 7, but it took Harry's death in September 1997 to spur Greg on to seek his natural father.

Greg previously had played football for Stoke City F.C. when they had been playing at their former ground, Victoria Ground. A cruciate ligament injury however ended his footballing career, and so he followed Harry into the manufacturing and retail fashion business.

With his relationship with his less-than-exemplary biological father expanding, Greg became more involved in the happenings of the Street. He struck up a relationship with Maxine Heavey, the local hairdresser. Always looking for "something better" he had an eye for a business deal and prospective bed partner. Greg convinced Mike Baldwin to take him on as a business partner - he would suss out the deals and Mike would pay him on a commission basis. Mike, seeing this as a win-win proposition agreed. Greg went to work at the factory.

He soon turned his attentions to Sally Webster, who had just lost her mum. Sally had inherited £55,000 and this was very appealing to Greg. He was more interested in her money than her but set his cap to relieve her of some of it. He ended his relationship with Maxine after relieving her of her intended flat above the Corner shop. Sally left her husband Kevin and their daughters behind to enter into what she thought would be a commitment with a new, exciting man. Realizing that she needed her children with her, Sally and the girls moved into the one bedroom flat above the shop. It was a tight fit and one that Greg took an immediate dislike to but he needed Sally's money if he were to make a go of his new underwear venture so he tried to remember the girls' names (unsuccessfully) and play happy families. Greg did not want to be a parent and left the flat as often as he could. It became clear to all but Sally, that Greg was simply using her.

After stealing all the contacts from Mike's computer at the factory, he took Sally's money and started his own company. Mike, not easily taken, fought back and won the contracts back. By now Greg had opened a "shop" and had Sally as his secretary rather than business partner. He felt the "optics" would be better. The loss of the contracts proved a turning point in their relationship however. Unhappy with the living arrangements, and especially with the girls, Greg's temper simmered just below boiling point for weeks. Then upon discovering that Sally had inadvertently told Gail about the contracts, he exploded and hit her, blaming her for the loss.

Sally, stunned at the turn in the relationship, threatened to leave until Greg convinced her it was a one off and that it would not happen again. Of course Greg had spoken to his solicitor to find out what would happen if they broke up. The solicitor informed him that Greg needed Sally and her fast dwindling capital in order to stay in business. Greg needed to come up with another plan - one that would see him financially secure at the expense of Sally. The three of them were crowding his style as well as his apartment and he needed to be shut of the lot - Sally, Rosie and Sophie. But if he had to persevere, to achieve his goal of financial and personal freedom, he would.

It was a short-lived respite from the violence. After a second beating from Greg, Sally took the kids, and what remained of her bank account and fled to Rita's without looking back. Greg, having not paid his rent, was threatened with eviction from the pokey flat over the shop and his life careened out of control. Becoming more and more dishelved the suits looking less smart and his appearance slipping - he turned once again to Maxine who, after a short fashion, cottoned on to his scheme to finagle a free ride and accommodation until something better came along. She quickly sent him off and with nowhere else to go, he ended up at the Battersbys living with his father and his family.

Blaming Sally for all of his problems, Greg began stalking and threatening her. Sally lived in fear for her safety and that of her two young girls. Greg, drunk and unhinged, broke into Rita's apartment and threatened Sally that he would "make her pay for what she did". She escaped what looked to be her final beating, and fled to the safety of the Street. Greg left the Street, after stealing the last of the money from Janice Battersby's leccie tin, at the end of 1998. Greg made a return in May 1999 and held Sally and her two daughters hostage in their own home in an attempt to force her to help him blackmail Mike after he had proof that Mike had been seeing another woman behind his wife Alma's back. The police were called and in a last-ditch attempt to protect her daughters, she hit Greg over the head with a chair, knocking him out cold, the police then stormed the house and Greg was arrested. He was later charged with false imprisonment.

== Edna Miller ==
Edna Miller
- Coronation Street character
- Portrayed by: Joan Kempson
- Duration: 1998, 2000–2001
- First appearance: 24 June 1998
- Last appearance: 19 September 2001
- Introduced by: Brian Park (1998); Jane MacNaught (2000)
In-universe information
- Occupation: Cleaner
- Sisters: Iris Merry
- Husband: Leslie

Edna Miller first appears in September 1998, when she is interviewed by Jack (Bill Tarmey) and Vera Duckworth (Liz Dawn) for the new job as barmaid in The Rovers Return Inn. Her immediate negativity is a turn-off and she fails to get the job. She reappears on 21 June 2000, when it is revealed that she has been working in packing in Underworld, and is moved to the factory floor, along with Karen Phillips (Suranne Jones).

It is not long before Edna gets herself into trouble when she gives journalist Ken Barlow (William Roache) a story about the poor working conditions in the factory, which he then publishes in The Weatherfield Gazette. Factory owner Mike Baldwin (Johnny Briggs) is livid at the publication and fires Deirdre Barlow (Anne Kirkbride), believing her to be Ken's source. Eventually, Edna admits that she is the mole, and is fired from the factory.

The Rovers Return landlady Natalie Barnes (Denise Welch) then hires Edna as a cleaner in the pub in September 2000. Edna remains working there until her sudden death on 19 September 2001. In the days leading up to her demise, she claims that she can sense death and firmly believes that landlord Duggie Ferguson (John Bowe) will soon meet his end. In a macabre twist of fate, Duggie finds Edna dead in his bed after a night of drinking in the pub. On 23 September 2001, Edna's funeral takes place, and the Weatherfield residents meet her equally miserable sister Iris Merry.

== Michael Wall ==
Michael Wall
- Coronation Street character
- Portrayed by: Dominic Rickhards
- Duration: 1998, 2000
- First appearance: 29 June 1998
- Last appearance: 3 November 2000
- Introduced by: Brian Park (1998); Jane MacNaught (2000)
In-universe information
- Occupation: Occupational Therapist

Michael Wall, portrayed by Dominic Rickhards, was an occupational therapist who helped Jim McDonald (Charles Lawson) recover from a building site accident which left him in a wheelchair. He first appeared between June and November 1998 on a recurring basis and again for two episodes in October and November 2000. This was Rickhards' first role in Coronation Street as he returned 25 years later, taking on the role of Dom Norwood.

During his first stint, Michael began an affair with Jim's wife, Liz McDonald (Beverley Callard) and they subsequently left Weatherfield together for Milton Keynes and subsequently got engaged. In his second stint, he returned to try and save his relationship with her, but she realised her home was in Weatherfield and her relationship with Michael had run its course.

A writer from ITVX put Michael on their list of Liz' top ten lovers and noted Jim caught the pair "having sex on his downstairs airbed!"

== Neil Flynn ==
Neil Flynn
- Coronation Street character
- Portrayed by: Tim Dantay
- First appearance: 31 August 1998
- Last appearance: 4 September 1998
- Introduced by: Brian Park
In-universe information
- Other names: Ronnie Clegg

Neil Flynn, played by Tim Dantay, made his first screen appearance on 31 August 1998.

When Neil was sent to prison for assault and GBH, he began sharing a cell with Ronnie Clegg (Dean Williamson). Years later, when Toyah Battersby (Georgia Taylor) comes looking for Ronnie in London, Neil pretends to be him. Toyah stays with Neil for a couple of days, but when she realises that he is not Ronnie, she tries to leave. However, Neil stops her and ties her up. He then takes her to some woods, but when he is distracted, Toyah manages to escape and is found by her parents.

The storyline attracted the attention of the Independent Television Commission, who believed that the episode featuring Neil's abduction of Toyah should have carried a warning before it was broadcast.

== Ronnie Clegg ==
Ronnie Clegg
- Coronation Street character
- Portrayed by: Dean Wiliamson
- Appears on: 4 September 1998
- Introduced by: Brian Park
In-universe information
- Wife: Paula Clegg
- Daughters: Toyah Battersby

Ronnie Clegg, played by Dean Wiliamson, appeared on 4 September 1998.

Ronnie Clegg is the biological father of Toyah Battersby (Georgia Taylor). Toyah's mother, Janice (Vicky Entwistle), threw him out in 1984 when Toyah was only two years old, calling him "Ronnie Clegg, useless dreg". He ended up in London, spending time in Wormwood Scrubs and sharing a cell with Neil Flynn (Tim Dantay). After his spell in prison he settled down and married a woman named Paula from whom he kept both his prison record and daughter a secret.

In August 1998 after a row with Janice and her stepfather Les Battersby (Bruce Jones), Toyah runs away from home and decides to travel to London to find Ronnie and goes to his old address not knowing that Ronnie has since moved and his mate from prison Neil Flynn now lives there. Toyah, thinking Neil was her father, stays with him for a couple of days but eventually realises he is not Ronnie and tries to escape. However, Neil stops her and ties her up. He then takes her to some woods, but when he is distracted, Toyah manages to escape and is found by Les and Janice.

Ronnie appeared to live up to Janice's reputation as a selfish and useless father as he showed little concern for his daughter, caring only that his wife Paula didn't find out about his past. He also failed to alert Les and Janice that Toyah might have wound up with a dangerous and violent man before it was too late.

== Pat Hegherty ==
Pat Hegherty
- Coronation Street character
- Portrayed by: Tony Barton
- Duration: 1998–2001
- First appearance: 7 September 1998
- Last appearance: 22 September 2001
- Introduced by: Brian Park
In-universe information
- Occupation: Builder; Handyman
- Sisters: Brenda Kingston
- Nephews: Sam Kingston

Pat Hegherty, played by Tony Barton, was a builder and a general handyman who did jobs for the residents of Coronation Street. His personality was jovial and cheerful, especially when it came to customers, but his business did exhibit some of the stereotypical aspects of the trade, such as giving assurances that weren't always met, stating that his prices were reasonable and a love for tea breaks, which were actually drinks at The Rovers Return. He was first employed by Alec Gilroy (Roy Barraclough) to build a door between his flat No. 12 Coronation Street and Rita Sullivan's (Barbara Knox) flat No. 10a. He never completed the job as he allegedly had to go off to do more urgent jobs, so Alec tried to complete it himself with no experience and ended up brings numerous pieces of rubble down and had to be rescued by Martin Platt (Sean Wilson) and Jack Duckworth (Bill Tarmey). Rita then employs a different builder to complete the task. Alec employs Hegherty again to change the locks on the doors of The Rovers just before Christmas 1998, whilst the Duckworths were in Blackpool, but was actually trying to evict them. A plan that Rita put a stop to.

The following Christmas, Pat rescued the Peacocks at No. 4 Coronation Street when their house was accidentally flooded. They subsequently employed him, ironically at Rita's recommendation, but Pat only completed the job when he charged Maxine Peacock (Tracy Shaw) double the rate. The following month, he went into partnership with Steve McDonald (Simon Gregson) in tendering for the contract to Duggie Ferguson (John Bowe) for the development of shops on Victoria Street. Steve tried to scam Duggie by having ornamental iron fireplaces ripped out which Pat joined in with. They both sold them and got £750 each. Duggie found out and demanded the fireplace costs were deducted from the bill. Two months later, Audrey Roberts (Sue Nicholls) fell victim to another one of Hegarty's scams when she had a rodent infestation at her salon, where he put mousetraps down and trapped mice that he put there. He tried to pull a similar scam on Rita in The Kabin, but Tyrone Dobbs (Alan Halsall) caught him. Pat's behaviors never changed and even after employing his nephew Sam Kingston, who in 2001 discovered that his uncle's grease remover caused residents to come out in rashes.

== Dobber ==
Dobber
- Coronation Street character
- Portrayed by: John Donnelly
- First appearance: 4 October 1998
- Last appearance: 1 November 1998
- Introduced by: Brian Park

Philip "Dobber" Dobson, played by John Donnelly, made his first screen appearance during the episode broadcast on 4 October 1998. Dobber and Toyah Battersby (Georgia Taylor) were involved in a notable storyline surrounding the subject of under-age sex. After a holiday romance, Dobber persuaded Toyah into losing her virginity to him in the back of his car. Tony Purnell from the Daily Mirror called Dobber "Mr Wrong", while the Daily Record's John Millar stated he was "one of the sleaziest characters to ooze across the cobbles of Weatherfield." He added "From the first instant we laid eyes on shifty Philip Dobson, we've known he's no good. But love is blind and so Toyah is prepared to do anything for what she believes is the man of her dreams."

== Linda Sykes ==
Linda Sykes
- Coronation Street character
- Portrayed by: Jacqueline Pirie
- Duration: 1998–2001
- First appearance: 14 October 1998
- Last appearance: 5 September 2001
- Introduced by: Brian Park
In-universe information
- Father: Ray Sykes
- Mother: Eve Sykes
- Brothers: Jimmy Sykes; Ryan Sykes; Dean Sykes
- Husband: Mike Baldwin (2000–2001)
- Stepsons: Danny Baldwin (2000–2001)

Linda Sykes (formerly Baldwin) is played by Jacqueline Pirie.

Linda arrived in 1998 and immediately found work as a machinist at the Underworld factory. She befriended fellow machinists Janice Battersby (Vicky Entwistle) and Alison Wakefield (Naomi Radcliffe), becoming bridesmaid at Alison's wedding to Kevin Webster (Michael Le Vell) in January 2000. She strongly disapproved of Hayley Cropper (Julie Hesmondhalgh), as she was disgusted when she learned that Hayley was a transsexual, but they later became friends.

Linda had a particularly tough background. Her mother, Eve (Melanie Kilburn), walked out when Linda was young and she, being the eldest, had to help her father Ray (Peter Guinness) raise her three younger brothers. When she was 15, her close friend, Karen Phillips (Suranne Jones), moved in after she became estranged from her parents and they later went on to work as machinists in a factory called Wheelers.

Shortly after her arrival, Linda's boss Mike Baldwin (Johnny Briggs) and his ex-wife Alma (Amanda Barrie) separated, following the revelation of Mike's affair with a former prostitute named Julia. Linda comforted her boss, who was 33 years her senior, and they soon started sleeping together. They began an affair which culminated when Mike proposed marriage and she accepted, knowing that he was a millionaire entrepreneur. As they planned to marry, Mike got in touch with his son Mark Redman (Paul Fox) and invited him to the wedding. Linda took a shine to Mike's son, who was not much younger than her, and she soon began an affair with him. However, as the wedding day approached, Linda decided to end the affair with Mark so that her wedding could go ahead. Mark, however, was infatuated with his father's fiancée and was devastated by her brush-off, so much so, that he halted the wedding by not coming initially and dragging Linda out of the church to speak to her. Linda's bridesmaid, Geena Gregory (Jennifer James), stalled the ceremony with a worried Mike standing at the altar alone while Mark proposed to Linda. She turned him down and returned to the church, telling Mike that he'd need to get a new best man as Mark had scarpered. Mark drowned his sorrows while Mike and Linda got married on 10 September 2000. However, Mark arrived at the wedding reception to tell his father that he and Linda had been having an affair. The bride admitted to Mike that, in a moment of weakness, she'd had a brief fling with Mark when he first arrived but it was over and she loved him more than anything else. Taking his new wife's side over his son's, an angry Mike disowned a devastated Mark and left for his honeymoon with Linda.

After returning, Linda did almost everything in her power to make her marriage successful and keep Mike happy, so that he would not throw her out for her infidelity. However, it soon became apparent that he still had a soft spot for his ex-wife Alma. This became more apparent when both Mike and Alma and other residents of the street were held hostage on 12 October 2000 at the supermarket Freshco's by two young thugs. The police eventually burst in and one of the young thugs was shot. However, when Linda arrived at the scene, she not only found her husband with his ex-wife, but also recognised that the thug who had been shot was her younger brother Dean Sykes (Ciarán Griffiths). Accompanied by Mike in the ambulance, a devastated Linda held her brother's hand as he died. After that she swore revenge on Emma Watts (Angela Lonsdale), the police officer who shot him.

It was then that Mike was introduced to Linda's family at Dean's funeral. Linda was very cold and distant to all her family members, treating them as if she was now above them, and she was especially hard towards her mother Eve. However, after the funeral Linda managed to patch things up with her mother and Eve returned to the street with her, where she met and fell in love with Fred Elliott (John Savident).

In February 2001, Mike confesses to her that his ex-wife Susan Barlow (Joanna Foster) had his son Adam Barlow twelve years earlier and didn't tell him about his existence; Linda was unimpressed.

Linda's marriage continued to go downhill as Mike learned that Alma was terminally ill with cervical cancer. This led to him caring for her and going on trips around the country with her, resulting in Linda embarking on an affair with a man named Harvey, one of Mike's clients, in May 2001. After being caught in the act by Mike in June 2001, Linda finally snapped and went round to Alma's to have it out with her. However, during their heated argument Alma collapsed and after calling an ambulance, Alma was diagnosed with kidney failure and carried upstairs to her bedroom by paramedics where she died in peace on 17 June 2001 with Mike, her best friend Audrey Roberts (Sue Nicholls) and Audrey's daughter Gail Platt (Helen Worth) by her side.

Linda was racked with guilt over the entire incident, and Mike soon made it clear that he could never trust her again. He announced that he wanted a divorce, but Linda was not prepared to go without a fight. After enduring months of heated arguments, Mike finally set his wife up by bringing his son Mark back to the street. As Linda prepared to rekindle their old romance, Mike walked in on them and triumphantly announced that their marriage was over.

They stayed together for an extra only for appearances sake as her mother was preparing to tie the knot with Fred. However, as the wedding took place on 5 September 2001, Mike made it clear to Linda that she would be gone by the end of the ceremony. He called a taxi for her and, along with Mark, dragged her from her hotel room to the taxi and sent her packing. She was never seen again.

After her departure, there was much debate over whether Mike had killed Linda and disposed of her body or not. Her car was found near the canal, and both her mother Eve and her brother Jimmy vowed to find her. However, Eve later discovered from her ex-husband Ray that Linda is alive and well and living in Dublin with a rich fiancé.

== Tyrone Dobbs ==
Tyrone Sylvester Dobbs is a fictional character from the long-running soap opera Coronation Street. He is played by Alan Halsall, and made his first appearance on 30 November 1998. He has been in the soap for 23 years. Tyrone has been married to Molly Compton (Vicky Binns), who died in the tram crash, and has had relationships with Fiz Brown (Jennie McAlpine) and Maria Connor (Samia Ghadie). In 2011, a love interest for Tyrone was introduced, in the form of Kirsty Soames (Natalie Gumede). Kirsty began physically abusing and controlling Tyrone throughout the course of 2012, and in 2013, Kirsty was arrested and sentenced for her treatment of Tyrone.

== Billy and Becky Mallett ==
Billy and Becky Mallett
- Coronation Street character
- Portrayed by: Lewis Ablatt (Billy); Megan Foster (Becky)
- Duration: 1998–2000
- First appearance: 25 December 1998
- Last appearance: 1 October 2000
- Introduced by: David Hanson
In-universe information
- Father: Gary Mallett
- Mother: Judy Mallett
- Grandfathers: Peter Mallett
- Grandmothers: Joyce Smedley
- Uncles: Shane Mallett

William "Billy" Mallett and Rebecca Joyce "Becky" Mallett are the twins born to Gary (Ian Mercer) and Judy Mallett (Gaynor Faye) on Christmas Day 1998. Aged just nine months, the twins lose their mother when Judy dies from an embolism in September 1999 and Gary has to bring them up alone. A year later, Gary decides to move away and the family leave Weatherfield for Blackpool in October 2000.

== Alison Webster ==
Alison Webster
- Coronation Street character
- Portrayed by: Naomi Radcliffe
- Duration: 1998–2000
- First appearance: 28 December 1998
- Last appearance: 7 June 2000
- Introduced by: David Hanson
In-universe information
- Occupation: Machinist
- Father: Bob Wakefield
- Mother: Joan Wakefield
- Sisters: Cheryl Wakefield
- Husband: Kevin Webster (2000)
- Sons: Jake Webster
- Stepdaughters: Sophie Webster (2000); Rosie Webster (2000)

Alison Webster (also Wakefield), played by Naomi Radcliffe, is the second wife of Kevin Webster (Michael Le Vell). She is a friend of Linda Sykes (Jacqueline Pirie) and works with her as a machinist at Underworld.

She dates Kevin for a while and they eventually move in together, causing trouble with Kevin's ex-wife Sally (Sally Dynevor) when their daughters, Rosie (Emma Collinge) and Sophie (Emma Woodward) seem to prefer being with Alison. Eventually Kevin, Sally and Alison sort things out and Alison introduces Kevin to her parents and they tell him that Alison is responsible for the accident that caused the death of her younger sister, Cheryl. Kevin, raising two daughters himself, makes it clear that he believes that Alison, a child herself at the time, is not responsible for her parents' neglect. Unsurprisingly, her parents do not react well.

They eventually marry and look forward to the birth of their first child but when she learns that her newborn son, Jake, died from a Group B streptococcal infection that he probably caught from her during delivery, she has a breakdown. Sadly, a combination of grief and the guilt that she feels about her sister's death lead her to snatch newborn Bethany Platt (Mia Cookson). When found together, Kevin persuades her to give Bethany to him and then she commits suicide by throwing herself under a passing lorry.
