= Charlie Stubbs (Coronation Street) =

Fictional character from Coronation Street

- Coronation Street character
- Portrayed by: Bill Ward
- Duration: 2003–2007
- First appearance: Episode 5623; 10 November 2003
- Last appearance: Episode 6471; 15 January 2007
- Book appearances: Coronation Street: The Complete Saga
In-universe information
- Occupation: Builder
- Half-brothers: Eddie Stubbs; Bobby Stubbs
- Sons: Jake Stubbs
- Daughters: Eloise Stubbs; Holly Grimshaw

Charlie Stubbs is a fictional character from the British ITV soap opera Coronation Street, played by Bill Ward. He made his first appearance during the episode broadcast on 10 November 2003 and last appearance on 15 January 2007.

During his time on the programme, Charlie gradually became the show's main antagonist, after it transpired that he had a narcissistic, manipulative and malevolent streak. This became evident during most of the character's story arc, which saw Charlie spark a relationship with local landlady Shelley Unwin (Sally Lindsay), whom he ends up mistreating, to the point where he clashes with her interfering mother Bev Unwin (Susie Blake), before she eventually jilts him at their wedding. He then went on to proceed in forming a rivalry with his colleague/enemy Jason Grimshaw (Ryan Thomas); instigating a feud with Shelley's ex-husband Peter Barlow (Chris Gascoyne) after assaulting him; embarking on an affair with Jason's girlfriend Maria Sutherland (Samia Smith); attempting to drown local teenager David Platt (Jack P. Shepherd) in retribution for the latter trying to blackmail him; and repeatedly clashing with Maria's best friend Claire Peacock (Julia Haworth) over his antagonistic nature.

In his exit storyline, Charlie rekindled his once-broken romance with Peter's stepsister Tracy Barlow (Kate Ford), who, unbeknownst to him, is plotting to exact revenge on the character after discovering the extent of his affairs and deceit. This ultimately leads to Tracy attacking Charlie with an ornament, which consequently results in Charlie being hospitalised and later dying of his injuries.

In the aftermath of Charlie's death it was revealed he fathered Holly Grimshaw after he claimed his name was Jason Grimshaw on a night out. In December 2010 Tracy returned to Coronation Street after being released on legal technicalities.

== Creation and development ==
Actor Bill Ward was cast in the role of Charlie. Ward signed a new contract with the British soap opera in early 2005, because the producers planned "to build Charlie's narcissistic and sadistic behaviour towards Shelley (Sally Lindsay)" throughout the year.

Upon the announcement that the character would begin a romance with Tracy Barlow (Kate Ford), a Coronation Street insider revealed that it was "a piece of genius by the writers pairing the show's biggest bitch with the vilest villain", and that "the antics they will get up to will obviously cause misery and heartache for many people." It was also revealed that "it was decided that the two characters of Charlie and Tracy were very much part of the programmes [sic] long-term future", and that it "therefore made sense to cement them together as a couple and to give them storylines guaranteed to make them two of Weatherfield's 'most hated'."

Charlie's character was expected to become "the most hated man on telly" when it was announced that he would embark on an affair and manipulate Maria Sutherland (Samia Smith).

Ward "shocked" Coronation Street producers by deciding to leave the serial a few months into his then-current contract, since they had "expected him to stay on after giving him another top storyline". The producers claimed that Bill was "an asset to the show", and that they "would have been developing further storylines for the character."

== Storylines ==
Charlie Stubbs first arrived in Weatherfield along with one of his fellow builders. Upon arrival, they become outraged when local factory owner Mike Baldwin (Johnny Briggs) refuses to move his car so they could park their vehicle. In retaliation, they used a bulldozer to move Mike's car and it was narrowly saved from being smashed up. Charlie later began dating Shelley Unwin (Sally Lindsay), which further escalated into a relationship. However, Charlie was unfaithful. When arsonist Maya Sharma (Sasha Behar) set fire to the Corner Shop on Coronation Street, Charlie and Ciaran McCarthy (Keith Duffy) broke in and rescued Dev (Jimmi Harkishin) and Sunita Alahan (Shobna Gulati).

Charlie eventually began harassing Shelley at every opportunity. At one point, he tried to make her choose between him and her mother, Bev (Susie Blake). On one occasion he ripped out Shelley's earrings in a fit of rage. When he threatened his colleague Jason Grimshaw (Ryan Thomas) for a sealant gun, Betty Williams (Betty Driver) overheard their conversation on the phone and thought Charlie wanted a genuine firearm. She phoned the police and he was arrested. When he was released, however, he became less violent. He accidentally opened a door which hit Shelley in the face. This caused him to lock her in her bedroom to stop people seeing her face as he knew people would think he was abusing her. Charlie later began to abuse Shelley mentally rather than physically, which caused her to develop agoraphobia. However, she received treatment, and Charlie proposed to her, but she jilted him on their wedding day. Despite begging for forgiveness, Shelley refused reconciliation.

In late 2005, Charlie began a relationship with Tracy Barlow (Kate Ford). He convinced her to move in with him, and later, in February 2006, manipulated her into having her daughter Amy (Madison Hampson/Amber Chadwick) move in with her parents. In turn, Tracy began to manipulate Charlie. She pretended to be pregnant, and used the money he gave her for an abortion to buy expensive shoes and used her "grief" to have him allow Amy to move back in. When Shelley visited before her mother's marriage to Fred Elliott (John Savident), she and Charlie had a one-night stand. She told Tracy about their night of passion, who accused her of lying.

Shelley later revealed that she was pregnant with Charlie's baby, but did not allow Charlie to have anything to do with the baby, and left. He and Tracy briefly split, but reconciled. Charlie later began an affair with Maria Sutherland (Samia Smith), who was renting his flat. When David Platt (Jack P. Shepherd) discovered the affair, he tried to blackmail Charlie, threatening to reveal the affair to Tracy. Charlie retaliated by trying to drown David in the bath, but was prevented from doing so when Maria arrived. When Tracy eventually found out about the affair, they split once more. Tracy began to plot revenge against Charlie, and pretended to make amends with him. She pretended he was abusing her, to the point of burning herself with an iron to make it look like Charlie was responsible for her injuries. He eventually realised Tracy was seeking revenge, and when he was about to tell her their relationship was over, she insisted on performing a lap dance for him. She hit him round the head with a heavy ornament, and he later died in hospital. Tracy claimed she had killed him in self-defence, but a court found her guilty, and she was given a life sentence.

== Reception ==
In 2005, actor Bill Ward claimed that people approached him regarding the abuse his character gave to Shelley Unwin (Sally Lindsay). He said that "every now and then, after a couple of beers, somebody will come up and say 'She deserves it, doesn't she?'", and that "they think Charlie is a hero and that it's all legitimate and acceptable behaviour, which it isn't." He also revealed that he "had to be more wary" about where he went since his character started his "reign of terror", and that he had notes left on his car, which he found "worrying and unnerving". Despite claiming some people condoned his behaviour, he also said that some people told him to "be nicer to that Shelley". Ward thought that his character was "a shocking man who behaves abysmally", but that as an actor, he had to "justify everything he does".

Grace Dent, an editor of The Guardian, described the character of Charlie as "a brilliant soap baddie", as a "philanderer and a mysoginist [sic]", and a "violent bully and a relentless liar." She opined that Charlie "ended almost every scene with a solitary moment spent smirking to himself about his latest huge fib", and that "by the time Charlie died, he was having so many smirks behind so many backs he spent many scenes pulling a face like he had a raspberry pip stuck in his dentures." Charlie has also been described as "a bona fide Coronation Street villain" and as "Greater Manchester's very own JR Ewing". The character has been opined to be "arguably the most graphic soap death".

The episode which featured the character's murder was listed as the second-most watched for any programme on TV in 2007, having been watched by 13.1 million viewers.

Ward received the Best Exit award in British Soap Awards 2007 for his role in the character of Charlie. The same year, the storyline which saw Charlie murdered by Tracy Barlow received the Best Storyline award. He was also nominated for the Inside Soap Best Bad Boy award.

== See also ==
- List of Coronation Street characters (2003)
- List of soap opera villains
