= Casey Carswell =

Fictional character from Coronation Street

- Coronation Street character
- Portrayed by: Zoë Henry
- First appearance: Episode 6513; 16 March 2007
- Last appearance: Episode 6635; 3 September 2007
In-universe information
- Husband: Mr Carswell
- Sons: Rhys Carswell

Casey Carswell is a fictional character from the British ITV soap opera Coronation Street. She was played by Zoë Henry, making her first appearance on 16 March 2007. K.C. was one of the women Claire Peacock (Julia Haworth) met through her voluntary phone counselling; she had lost her baby. Her character has noted to the police that her nickname is K.C., not Casey, using the first letter in her first name and second name, respectively. Casey's actress, Zoë Henry, had previously played Log Thwaite on the soap in 1998.

== Casting and development ==
Upon her casting, Zoë Henry revealed that her husband, Jeff Hordley, who plays Cain Dingle in Emmerdale, had given her advice on playing a villainous role.

Talking to The Sunday Mirror, Henry said, "My husband played a baddie for a long time, but it's different being a bad girl - people are not so sympathetic. Women especially always love a bad guy, and Jeff always got a good reaction, but I'm not sure how people will react to me." She added, "Casey is an out-and-out bitch, and a few times people in the street have shouted that I'm evil. I love playing a home-wrecker, but I'm apprehensive about how people will react as she gets worse."

== Storylines ==
On 1 April 2007, Claire Peacock (Julia Haworth) left her new friend Casey to babysit her son, Freddie Peacock (Dylan & Hayden Whitbread), while she went out. When she returned, Freddie and Casey had left, so she panicked and called the police, worried that Casey had kidnapped him. Claire had met Casey through her work on the phone lines of a support group for women who had miscarried. However, Casey explained that she had taken Freddie out for a drive because he would not settle, but was upset that Claire had called the police and left just as they arrived. In June, Casey was seen stalking Claire and was thought to be responsible for the fire at 4 Coronation Street. When her photograph appeared in the Weatherfield Gazette and on the news, she went to the police, was released without charge, and then confronted Claire.

Casey and Claire resumed their friendship, and Casey showed an interest in Claire's husband, Ashley (Steven Arnold), after Claire said she was worried that her marriage was in trouble. On 30 July, Casey made a move on Ashley, and they were about to sleep together when Claire came home early. Audrey Roberts (Sue Nicholls), a friend of Ashley's late father, was concerned about Ashley and Claire's marriage and saw Casey taking Claire's place with Ashley and Josh while Claire was away, on Casey's advice. Audrey confronted Ashley, who admitted that he was having an affair with Casey, saying Claire did not seem to realize his needs. Ashley told Casey that Audrey knew about their affair, and Casey confronted Audrey, warning her to stay away. Audrey told her that she was just a fling that Ashley would get over. Casey, however, insisted that she and Ashley were a proper couple and claimed that they had been having an affair for months. Audrey told Casey that she had betrayed Claire as a friend and that the affair was her way of getting revenge. Casey responded by implying that she, Ashley, and Josh would soon be a proper family, and that neither Audrey nor Claire would be able to prevent it. Later, Audrey persuaded Claire to come home, and Ashley ended his affair with Casey, convinced that he still loved Claire. Claire was shocked to learn that Casey had been visiting regularly, helping out with Josh, cooking Ashley dinner, and even sleeping there. Suspicious, Claire and Ashley told Casey to leave. Claire asked Ashley if he had been sleeping with Casey, but he denied it. Casey later confronted Audrey and told her that she had pushed Ashley to break Claire's heart and reveal that they were together. Claire then invited Casey to lunch, while Ashley told Casey to stop stalking him. Casey relished telling Ashley that she was not going anywhere and continued to stalk him for some time. One day, she saw an opportunity to get his attention when he left Freddie with Kirk Sutherland (Andy Whyment). Casey seized it, telling Kirk that Ashley had asked her to pick up Freddie and asking Ashley to phone her. She then told Audrey that she and Ashley were a couple and would be getting married. Ashley was horrified to learn that Casey had taken Freddie, so he phoned her and went to her flat, insisting that Kirk keep this from Claire. Audrey, however, told Claire about Casey's behaviour, and Kirk told Claire that Casey had taken Freddie, so she and Audrey rushed to Casey's flat after calling the police.

Ashley was horrified to see Casey's walls covered with photos of him and to see Casey on the balcony holding Freddie. She admitted starting the fire, explaining that she felt Claire was in the way. Ashley, realizing how ill his mistress was, tried to convince her that her feelings for him were not real. Shocked by Ashley's words, Casey moved closer to the edge of the balcony with Freddie, saying that if Ashley did not love her, then she and Freddie might as well be dead. Claire arrived, and Casey forced Ashley to tell Claire the truth: that they were having an affair and had slept together while Claire was at her support group. Claire remained silent, so Casey demanded that Ashley propose to her; worried about Freddie, Ashley did so. Casey was elated, but Claire challenged her. She reminded Casey of what she had said about the death of her baby, a boy she named Rhys, and of all her hopes for him and how she had imagined he would grow up. Casey, now irritated, ran toward Claire, and Claire took Freddie. Casey then tried to jump from the balcony, but Ashley stopped her just as the police burst in and took a hysterical Casey away. In a later episode, the police officer in charge of Casey's case visited the Peacocks and told Ashley and Claire that Casey was mentally unfit to stand trial. She was sectioned under the Mental Health Act indefinitely, as she was considered a serious danger to other people.

== Reception ==
The plot, which featured Casey threatening Freddie, was speculated as being similar to an episode of Tonight with Trevor McDonald. Tragedy mum, Natasha Hogan, was interviewed to support this.

== See also ==
- List of soap opera villains
