= Joanna Foster =

British actress

- Education: Royal Central School of Speech and Drama
- Occupation: Actress
- Years active: 1978–present
- Notable work: Diary of A Desperate Woman, The Eve of Saint Venus, Brezhnev's Children
- Television: Coronation Street
- Parent: Barry Foster
- Relatives: Miranda Foster (sister)

Joanna Foster is a British actress active in theatre and television since 1978. On stage, she created roles in the world premieres of Andrew Davies's Diary of A Desperate Woman (1979), Anthony Burgess's The Eve of Saint Venus (1979), and Olwen Wymark's Brezhnev's Children (1991), and has performed leading roles with the Royal Shakespeare Company, Royal National Theatre, The Young Vic, Leicester Haymarket Theatre, and The Dukes, Lancaster among other theatre companies. She was the fourth and final actress to portray Susan Barlow in Coronation Street.

== Career ==
=== Education and stage work ===
Foster is the daughter of the actor Barry Foster and the sister of the actress Miranda Foster. She was trained at the Royal Central School of Speech and Drama. While as a student, she performed the role of Celia in the Central School's January 1978 production of Christopher Hampton's The Philanthropist. She made her professional stage debut at the Mercury Theatre, Colchester in September 1978 as Valeria in Aphra Behn's 1677 play The Rover. It was the first un-censored staging of the play since the 1750s; restoring much of the original bawdy language.

In 1979, Foster starred in the world premiere of Andrew Davies's Diary of A Desperate Woman at the Belgrade Theatre in Coventry, England. That same year she became a resident actress at the New Wolsey Theatre; making her debut with the company in a production of Carlo Goldoni's 1746 play The Servant of Two Masters. Other roles she performed at that theatre included Diana in the world premiere of Anthony Burgess's The Eve of Saint Venus (1979), Gerda in a stage adaptation of Hans Christian Andersen's The Snow Queen (1980), and Hermia in William Shakespeare's A Midsummer Night's Dream (1980).

In 1980, Foster portrayed the role of Cheppi / Ilona in János Nyiri's If Winter Comes at the Leicester Haymarket Theatre. She had a critical triumph as Nora Helmer in Henrik Ibsen's A Doll's House at The Dukes, Lancaster in 1981; a production which used a new contemporary English language translation by playwright Pam Gems. The Stage theatre critic Robin Duke wrote "Given the contemporary nature of the new translation, the play compounds its earlier feminist ideals and clenches a new iron fist in a velvet glove. Much of the thanks goes to a remarkable performance by Joanna Foster as the trapped Nora Helmer. She positively trembles with nervous energy, hands desperately seeking somewhere to rest, eyes too busy to settle." She returned to The Dukes in successive seasons as Laura Wingfield in Tennessee Williams's The Glass Menagerie (1981), Juliet in Shakespeare's Romeo and Juliet (1981), and Stella in A Streetcar Named Desire (1983). Reviewing the latter performance, The Guardian theatre critic Robin Thornber stated, "Joanna Foster makes Stella a true star of the play, all sweet reason and patience, torn for compassion both for her sister's sensitivity and her husband's animal pride."

In 1982, Foster starred as Armand in the Royal Shakespeare Company's production of Mikhail Bulgakov's Molière at The Other Place in Stratford-upon-Avon; a performance described as "alluring" by The Observer. Her other performances with the RSC included the Gentlewoman in Macbeth (1982) and Hero in Much Ado About Nothing (1983). In 1984 she performed in David Pownall's Music to Murder By at the Nuffield Southampton Theatre. In 1985, she appeared at the Young Vic as Isabella in David Thacker's staging of Shakespeare's Measure for Measure with Peter Guinness as the Duke and Margot Leicester as Mariana. The Guardian theatre critic Desmond Christy wrote,

"The great scenes between Isabella and Angelo are outstanding. Joanna Foster's Isabella is not the best spoken sister of mercy we have seen but she is one of the most feeling. This is not a neurotic novice obsessed with chastity but one who sincerely believes that her immortal soul is worth more than her brother's life. This moral absolutism, pitted against Angelo's lustful casuistry, makes for superb drama."

In 1986, Foster starred as Lucy in Peter Wood's staging of Bertolt Brecht's The Threepenny Opera at the Royal National Theatre (RNT) with Tim Curry and Sally Dexter, and performed in a special concert of Brecht's music entitled "Sung and Unsung", also with the RNT. That same year she appeared as Lady Macbeth in Shakespeare's 1606 tragedy at the Torch Theatre, Milford Haven. In 1988, she portrayed Ann Deever in Arthur Miller's All My Sons at the Theatre Royal, Manchester.

In 1991, Foster created the role of Galina in the world premiere of Olwen Wymark's Brezhnev's Children with the Moving Target Theatre Company; a work based on Julia Voznesenskaya's 1987 Russian novel The Women's Decameron. In 1995, she portrayed Abigail Brodsky in the UK premiere of Carole Braverman's The Yiddish Trojan Women; a work mounted by the Soho Theatre Company at the Cockpit Theatre in London. That same year she portrayed Keely in the United Kingdom première of Jane Martin's Keely and Du at the Royal Theatre, Northampton. In 1996, she toured internationally as a member of the Actors of the London Stage; performing Shakespeare plays with a minimal cast of five actors who played multiple parts. In 1998, she starred opposite her sister Miranda for the first time in their careers in a production of José Triana's The Criminals at the Lyric Theatre in Hammersmith; with Joanna portraying the role of Beba and Miranda in the part of Cuca.

In 2006 she portrayed Zise Feige in Isaac Bashevis Singer's The Dead Fiddler at the New End Theatre.

=== Television and film ===
Foster's first television role was as Theresa in the 1979 BBC television drama Testament of Youth. The following year she portrayed Clara Brewer in the ITV television series Flickers. In 1982, she starred as Fran in "The Visitor"; a supernatural thriller made for the British horror anthology series West Country Tales. In 1988, she portrayed Ellen Thompson in the BBC television series Blind Justice; an award winning television series produced by Michael Wearing which "exposed the inadequacies of the British criminal justice system".

Between 1992 and 1993, Foster played staff general manager Kate Miller in the hospital drama Casualty. She is the fourth actress to portray the role of Susan Barlow in Coronation Street, after Katie Heannau, Wendy Jane Walker and Suzy Paterson. She played the character for one month from January 2001 until the character's death in a car crash in February 2001. She also starred in the Five soap Family Affairs between 2002 and 2003, where she played Ginny Davenport. She also played the role of Miriam, the sister of Moses, in the History Channel's The Bible.
