= Claire Peacock =

Fictional character from Coronation Street

- Coronation Street character
- Portrayed by: Julia Haworth
- Duration: 2003–2011
- First appearance: Episode 5483; 9 April 2003
- Last appearance: Episode 7514; 14 January 2011
- Created by: Kieran Roberts
In-universe information
- Occupation: Childminder taxi driver switch operator
- Mother: Yvonne Casey
- Husband: Ashley Peacock (2004–2010)
- Sons: Freddie Peacock
- Adoptive sons: Joshua Peacock

Claire Peacock (also Casey) is a fictional character from the British ITV soap opera Coronation Street. Played by Julia Haworth, the character first appeared onscreen during the episode airing on 9 April 2003, as the new nanny of established character Ashley Peacock's (Steven Arnold) son Joshua Peacock (Benjamin Beresford). Her storylines have since seen her fall in love with and marry Ashley, developing post natal depression after giving birth to their son Freddie. Claire was originally intended to be central to a long-running child abduction storyline, however, this was dropped by the show's producers as a result of its close resemblance to the disappearance of Madeleine McCann.

The character has been criticised by Coronation Street's former executive producer David Liddiment, for being used as a vehicle to support a politicised corporate campaign, encouraging social action and volunteer work. The storyline, which saw Claire sectioned for mental health issues after developing postnatal depression, was similarly criticised by health workers, who opined that the plot line was poorly handled, and could potentially prevent women suffering from the condition from seeking help.

Haworth has commented that she sees the role of Claire as "one job in a career of many jobs". The actress took a temporary break from the show in mid-2008 to give birth to her first child, though her character never left officially onscreen. Claire reappeared on 16 February 2009. On 23 April 2010, it was announced that the Peacock family had been axed from the ITV soap and Claire made her last appearance on 14 January 2011.

== Development ==
=== Casting ===
Upon her 2003 arrival in Coronation Street, Claire is described by the show's producers as "Weatherfield's answer to Mary Poppins". Of her personality, they stated that "On the surface she seems quiet, but is more than capable of fighting her corner." Although Claire and on-screen husband Ashley temporarily separate after Ashley's affair with Casey Carswell (Zoe Henry), the show's producers have described their renewed relationship as being "domestic bliss". Actress Julia Haworth has called Claire "a one man girl", commenting: "I truly believe with Claire and Ashley that what doesn't kill them only makes them stronger. I really do think that they're a solid couple and they can get through whatever life throws at them. They're probably the only couple in the Street I can say that about."

Asked how long she saw herself remaining in the role of Claire in September 2006, Haworth responded, "I class myself as an actress that goes from job to job. [...] I've always just seen this as one job in a career of many jobs, hopefully. But I'm really enjoying myself here and there's a great team of people. We've got brilliant writers. So for the time being, I'm very happy here." The actress took a break from Coronation Street in mid-2008, after falling pregnant with her first child. Claire was temporarily written out of the show, but returned in 2009.

=== Tram crash ===
A storyline which would have seen Claire crash a tram into the Rovers Return Inn failed to reach fruition in 2005. Although Claire applied for a job as a tram driver on screen, the plotline developed no further. Chris Mulligan, Director General of the Greater Manchester Passenger Transport Executive revealed that, "Following an approach from Granada Television, we made it clear that we would find any storyline involving a tram accident questionable. Given Metrolink's excellent safety record, we felt that such a sensationalist storyline would be both misleading and detrimental to the image of the network." Cheryl Hubbard from Serco Metrolink added; "We were concerned because there were safety implications which they were planning to portray in a bad light. They contacted us and asked what it was like for our drivers during training, but because they were planning to then have her driving a tram off the viaduct we said if that's going to be the case we weren't happy with it at all. I think people in Manchester would also be unhappy about them portraying the specific Manchester tram system in this sort of light." However, Coronation Street officials denied that the storyline was pulled due to Manchester transport officials' concerns. A spokeswoman for the show stated: "It was one of the storylines being mooted for the year and it was decided not to pursue it. We felt we'd had quite a lot of high-octane drama in the planning block it would have fallen into. It was simply a decision by the programme makers to have something more light-hearted instead. They decided on Les (Bruce Jones) and Cilla's (Wendi Peters) wedding, which will be no less a high production number." A smaller scale storyline aired the same year saw Claire instead train as a bus driver, accidentally running down Chesney Battersby-Brown's (Sam Aston) dog Schmeichel on her first day. In December 2010, Coronation Street did have a Tram Crash storyline to celebrate the show's 50th anniversary. Claire's husband Ashley was killed in the storyline.

=== Post-natal depression ===
Shortly after the birth of their son Freddie, Claire began to develop Post-Natal Depression (2006).

Haworth summarised the plot line as having been "very draining", explaining; "You can't help take some of it home with you, but that's how you really learn about your character." Regardless, she stated that the post-natal depression had been her favourite storyline as Claire; "because it stretched me as an actress and gave me the chance to follow something from beginning to end and make it my own." Of her initial reaction to the plot line, she explained: "I was delighted with it because I've been in the show for three-and-a-half years and this seemed like the storyline I could finally get my teeth into and show the different sides to Claire. I do believe she is a multi-faceted person whereas a lot of people just say 'I think she's a bit dull, a bit boring and a bit nice', so this was a chance to say 'well no, she's a lot more complex than you take her for'."

=== Child abduction ===
The storyline, which saw character Casey Carswell set fire to the Peacocks' home while Claire was inside with son Freddie, was initially intended to be the beginning of a four-month-long child abduction plot. However, the coinciding disappearance of Madeleine McCann caused the event to be quickly rewritten.

=== Departure ===
In April 2010, it was announced that the Peacock family would be written out by the end of the year, after a mutual decision with producer Phil Collinson that the family had run their course. Producers were said to be working on a "suitable" exit for both of the characters.

== Storylines ==
Claire first arrives in Weatherfield as nanny to Joshua Peacock, after his mother Maxine (Tracy Shaw) is murdered by Richard Hillman (Brian Capron). A romance develops between Claire and Joshua's father, Ashley Peacock (Steven Arnold); however, Ashley is apprehensive about entering a relationship so soon after his wife's death and they separate. But they reconcile in June 2004, and Ashley proposes to Claire and the couple marry on Christmas Day 2004. On their first wedding anniversary on Christmas Day 2005, Claire tells Ashley that she is two months pregnant.

On 17 July 2006, Claire gives birth to their son, Thomas. However, she suffers from severe post-natal depression and avoids spending time with Thomas and lacks interest in him. After attempting to return her child to the hospital, claiming he has been switched at birth and pushing him in his pram into a busy road, Claire is sectioned under the Mental Health Act. She is allowed to return home a month later, and chooses to rename Thomas as Freddie, following the death of Ashley's father, Fred Elliott (John Savident).

Claire marries Ashley on Christmas Day (2004).

In late 2006, Tracy Barlow (Kate Ford) befriends Claire when she and her boyfriend Charlie Stubbs (Bill Ward) become the Peacocks' new neighbours. However, her friendship with Claire is a ploy to get her on her side as she plots her revenge on Charlie for cheating on her with Maria Sutherland (Samia Smith). Claire becomes suspicious and worries when she hears arguments and slamming doors and is convinced that Tracy is a victim of domestic abuse. She begins keeping a record of these occurrences, much to Tracy's delight, as she is pretending that Charlie is beating her. When Tracy kills Charlie in January 2007, Claire loyally stands by her and testifies on her behalf in court at the murder trial. However, Claire's evidence is disputed as her history of mental illness is brought up by the prosecution.

In 2007, Claire begins working for Weatherfield's "Women In Crisis" helpline, where she meets and befriends a woman who has lost her child – KC Carswell (Zoe Henry). The pair fall out when KC takes Freddie without informing Claire. In May 2007, the Peacocks' house catches fire. Claire is rescued from the burning building, but Freddie is not and is missing until he is later found in a local park. The police reveal that an accelerant had been discovered at the source of the fire, indicating that it had been started deliberately. Due to her previous mental illness, Claire is suspected of starting the fire and is arrested but later released without charge. Claire privately suspects KC of starting the fire, and it is later revealed she is being stalked by her. KC goes on to begin an affair with Ashley. Claire and Ashley separate when his infidelity is revealed, but they are reunited when it emerges that KC started the fire, and Claire narrowly prevents her from killing herself and Freddie after abducting him.

In 2008, Claire and Ashley begin experiencing financial difficulties. In a bid to reduce costs, Claire agrees to a house swap with Sally Webster (Sally Dynevor). Contention arises, however, when Claire believes Sally has manipulated the estate agent into overvaluing the Websters' house while undervaluing their house. The two families live together temporarily when a wiring fault means that the Peacocks have to move out while it is repaired. Claire and Sally fall out when Claire discovers vintage Beatles programmes in the attic of the Websters' former home, and sells them for £7,000. Sally throws the Peacocks out, and the family go to live with Claire's mother Yvonne Casey (Yvonne O'Grady). However, Kevin (Michael Le Vell) and Ashley remain on good terms, and Ashley and Claire move into the Websters' old home again. Sally and Claire are seen talking in March 2009, and the feud seemed to have been forgotten.

In July 2009, Claire and Ashley go through marital difficulties and Claire collapses. She is found by Lloyd Mullaney (Craig Charles) and rushed to the hospital, where it is revealed that she has had a miscarriage, and discovers that she had been three months pregnant. Ashley is heartbroken as doctors discover that she also had a potentially fatal blood clot on her lung. However, she soon recovers. During her recovery, Claire, fearful of her postnatal depression reoccurring, decides not to have any more children and insists that Ashley have a vasectomy. He eventually agrees and has the operation on his second trip to the clinic, as last-minute nerves overwhelmed him the first time.

After this, Claire becomes extremely active in the local community. She organises a street fair in the summer of 2009, which goes well until Joshua is rushed to the hospital, following an allergic reaction to a wasp sting. Claire feels guilty as she had ignored Joshua's earlier complaints of pain, but he soon recovers. That winter she develops a close yet unlikely friendship with Becky McDonald (Katherine Kelly), despite their initial dislike due to Becky's stepdaughter, Amy Barlow's (Amber Chadwick) use of bad language in front of Joshua and Freddie. Together with Becky and John Stape (Graeme Hawley), they organise a pantomime of Cinderella shortly before Christmas 2009, which features Claire in the title role, Steve McDonald (Simon Gregson) as Prince Charming and Becky as Dandini. This too is very successful, apart from when Claire's concerns for Amy are illustrated when, on stage, she becomes star struck and, instead of singing, says a swear word.

On 6 December 2010, a huge explosion tears through 'The Joinery' bar and seriously damages the viaduct above, which leads to a tram derailing and crashing into the neighbouring corner shop and causes the Peacock's house to catch fire. Claire escapes unharmed along with her children and other children she had been babysitting and takes refuge in Roy's Rolls cafe along with other residents. She then proceeds to call Ashley to tell him what has happened but she gets no signal and leaves a message. Ashley listens to the message and sends one back just before the roof of the bar collapses and falls on him killing him just as he saves Peter Barlow's (Chris Gascoyne) life. Claire is left devastated in the wake of the tragedy and moves in at The Rovers with Steve and Becky.

Tracy returns to the Street on Christmas Eve and on Christmas Day, Claire confronts her in The Rovers about using her during her trial and making insulting remarks about Ashley. Tracy mocks Claire's mental illness and continues insulting her and Ashley repeatedly over the following week.

On New Year's Eve, Tracy is attacked in her back yard and left in a coma with serious head injuries. After Becky is arrested and questioned for the assault, Claire confesses that she attacked Tracy as she was frustrated with the way she had insulted Ashley and wanted to stand up to her bullying and show Tracy that she could not push her around. Claire tells her sons she loves them before going to the police station and confessing to attacking Tracy. Claire is released on bail and Steve, Becky and Ashley's employee at the shop, Graeme Proctor (Craig Gazey) advise her to leave the country to avoid going to prison. Graeme obtains false passports for her and the boys and when the police come looking for her, Steve, Becky, Graeme, Tina McIntyre (Michelle Keegan), Rosie Webster (Helen Flanagan), Jason Grimshaw (Ryan Thomas) and Eileen Grimshaw (Sue Cleaver) help her evade them by setting a decoy. After the police give up and leave, Jason drives Claire, Joshua and Freddie to the airport so they can get a flight as they leave Weatherfield for France.

The next day, Eileen receives a phonecall from Claire who tells her that she and the boys had arrived safely. After she is discharged from hospital, Tracy, who wanted revenge on Claire for attacking her, overhears Becky speaking to Claire on her mobile phone two weeks later. Tracy demands to know where Claire is and Becky refuses to tell her of her whereabouts and gleefully explains that Claire is not coming back.

== Reception ==
In 2005, The Guardian writer and former Coronation Street executive producer David Liddiment heavily criticised a storyline which saw Claire campaign to save the show's fictional 'Red Rec' recreation ground, deeming it "a political soap". He wrote: "At the end of each episode viewers were invited to find out more about volunteering by contacting ITV's Britain on the Move campaign. This, apparently, is the Year of the Volunteer. So Claire's storyline was really a bit of social action working undercover in Britain's most popular show." Liddiment claimed that the storyline damaged the show's editorial integrity, asserting "Not only was the Red Rec storyline created specifically to support a corporate campaign, it was introduced at the behest of ITV CEO Charles Allen who, we are told with some trumpeting on the ITV website, helped devise it. [...] Television, and ITV in particular, has a sterling record of social action campaigns on- and off-air. But soap, corporate agendas and politicians make a heady mix best avoided."

The 2006 storyline which saw Claire develop post natal depression was deemed irresponsible by health workers from the Pendlebury Health Centre. They claimed; "Detaining women in mental health units with postnatal depression would be an extremely rare occurrence. We were very concerned that the plot had child protection being considered when Claire presented at hospital rather than urgently alerting the health visitor service for additional support. Many women with this illness are concerned that they may have their baby taken from them and as postnatal depression is treatable this is highly unlikely to happen. We do hope that this storyline will not prevent women from seeking help if they are feeling low following the birth of a baby." Coronation Street's producer Steve Frost defended the storyline, stating; "While many women in a similar situation receive help from the medical community such as doctors, health visitors and midwives, Claire went to great lengths to conceal the extent of her problems from everyone – even her husband Ashley – and was perceived by most people to be someone coping excellently with her role as a new mum. The psychiatrists who advised us felt there could be a case for Claire's detention. In addition, great pains were taken not to confuse post-natal depression with puerperal psychosis."

In August 2007, TV critic Jim Shelley wrote that "Coronation Street has become unwatchable", partly attributing the show's downfall to Claire, who; "is going mad – again – this time because she is suspected of kidnapping her baby and attempting suicide by burning the house down, two good ideas, as it goes." Conversely, Guardian reviewer Nancy Banks-Smith deemed Claire the "voice of reason" at the climax of the storyline which saw her son Freddie abducted by former friend Casey Carswell (Zoe Henry). However, commenting on the re-write of the plot strand because of the disappearance of Madeleine McCann, Banks-Smith asserted that it had "never made much sense, even by soap standards", using the depiction of Claire as an example of the show's over-embellished writing: "Even in a tragic episode, the writing in Coronation Street is like a stone skipping across deep water. The script, like a Victorian pub, is so embellished with grapes and roses that you know the stonemason is just indulging himself. Claire, originally a mouse, has taken to flashing her eyes, floating her hair and calling herself the Madwoman of Shalott, a very literary joke. Like Knickbocker's Gloria, this is just the writer, Jonathan Harvey, playing with words."

Lucy Lather from Inside Soap included Claire and Ashley's romance in a feature profiling negatively received storylines. Lather believed Ashley needed to be with another "firecracker" like Maxine and questioned "could their be a duller couple?".
