= The Eve of Saint Venus =

Book by Anthony Burgess

- Author: Anthony Burgess
- Language: English
- Publisher: Sidgwick & Jackson
- Publication date: 1964

The Eve of Saint Venus is a story or, as author Anthony Burgess (pen-name of John Burgess Wilson) put it, an "opusculum", on the theme of marriage. Originally conceived as a play in three acts in 1952, it was re-written as a novella after the author initially failed to find a theatre willing to stage the play. The novella was first published in 1964. The play version of the work premiered in 1979.

== History ==
The first version of this story was written in 1952 as a three-act theological comedy. Initially Burgess planned to use it as a libretto for an opera he intended writing. However the libretto became too long to work in an opera, and he completed it as a stage play. When he was unable to find a drama group willing to mount a production, he set it aside, and eventually released it as a novel, retaining some of the poetry that survived from the would-be libretto, including a sonnet, a hymn to (sexual) love. Andrew Biswell describes this, and the problematic nature of Burgess's own first marriage while he was writing the libretto, in his biography of Burgess.

Burgess's play version of The Eve of Saint Venus received its premiere at the New Wolsey Theatre in December 1979 with a cast that included Ian Talbot as Ambrose, Joanna Foster as Diana, Catherine Terris as Julia, Brian Ralph as George Selway, M.P., Audrey Barr as Mrs. Selway, and Gabrielle Hamilton as Nanny. Antony Tuckey directed the production.

Burgess also made several sketches of characters in the novel. (These are in a notebook in the archive of the Anthony Burgess Centre at the University of Angers.)

A new edition of the book, which Burgess described as a "tribute to matrimony", was dedicated to the Prince and Princess of Wales, and published in 1981, the year of their marriage. The Prince and Princess separated in 1992, and were divorced in 1996.

Burgess wrote in the preface to another edition, that of 1984: "I dedicate this work to all ... who, ... having achieved [marriage],... are still not disillusioned with it."
