= The Truth About Love (film) =

- Film poster
- Directed by: John Hay
- Written by: Peter Bloore; William Johnston
- Produced by: Tracey Adam
- Starring: Jennifer Love Hewitt; Jimi Mistry; Dougray Scott; Branka Katić; Kate Miles
- Cinematography: Graham Frake
- Edited by: David Martin
- Music by: Debbie Wiseman
- Production companies: Picadilly Pictures; Lakeshore International
- Distributed by: First Look Studios (United States); Universal Pictures (United Kingdom)
- Release dates: 21 April 2005 (South Korea); 25 October 2005 (United States); 16 February 2007 (United Kingdom)
- Running time: 100 minutes
- Countries: United Kingdom; United States
- Language: English

The Truth About Love is a 2005 film directed by John Hay and starring Jennifer Love Hewitt, Jimi Mistry and Dougray Scott.

== Plot ==
After Alice Holbrook (Jennifer Love Hewitt), a happily married English woman living in Bristol, receives an anonymous Valentine's Day card with radish seeds in it, she automatically assumes the card is from her supposedly loving lawyer husband, Sam (Jimi Mistry), and that he is trying to be romantic. In return, Alice decides to write an anonymous reply to her husband to keep the gimmick going, but only accidentally sends the card after a drunken night with her sister. What Alice does not realise, however, is that her husband did not, in fact, send her the original Valentine's Day card; her husband's best friend and lawyer partner, Archie (Dougray Scott), did.

== Cast ==
- Jennifer Love Hewitt as Alice Holbrook
- Dougray Scott as Archie Gray
- Jimi Mistry as Sam Holbrook
- Branka Katić as Katya
- Simon Webbe as Dan Harlow
- Kate Miles as Felicity
- Stefan Dennis as Dougie

== Reception ==
On Rotten Tomatoes, the film has a 0% rating based on 11 critic reviews.
