= John Hay (director) =

English film director

John Hay is an English film director, writer and producer.

== Career ==
After leaving university, he began directing for UK television, making dramas such as Looking Back and two adaptations of Heathcote Williams' epic poems, Falling for a Dolphin and Autogeddon, which starred Academy Award-winner Jeremy Irons. Autogeddon was critically revered and won the Jury Prize at Shanghai, which led to Hay's working with Al Pacino on Every Time I Cross the Tamar I Get into Trouble, a short about Pacino’s personally-financed feature The Local Stigmatic, which was based on a stage play by Heathcote Williams. He worked again with Pacino in 1996 on Looking for Richard, starring Kevin Spacey and Alec Baldwin.

With his writing partner, Rik Carmichael, he co-wrote and directed an adaptation of a Jim Corbett story, The Man-Eating Leopard of Rudraprayag which starred Jason Flemyng and Jodhi May. For independent production company Childsplay Productions, he also wrote one episode of original sci-fi drama Life Force, and directed an adaptation of the children's story Stig of the Dump, which won a BAFTA and an Emmy Award. His film There's Only One Jimmy Grimble, which starred Robert Carlyle and Ray Winstone, won the Crystal Bear for Best Film at the Berlin Film Festival in 2001 and ten other first prizes including the Golden Griffin for best feature at Giffoni Film Festival. In 2021, he directed and co-wrote To Olivia, a film about a tumultuous year in the life of Roald Dahl and Patricia Neal. It stars Hugh Bonneville, Keeley Hawes, Sam Heughan and Geoffrey Palmer in his last film role.

He is attached to a live-action version of Captain Pugwash and a Second World War spy drama, Lives in Secret, based on Sarah Helm's book, A Life in Secrets.

== Major works ==
=== As director ===
- Minutes (1991)
- The Steal (1995)
- Q.E.D (1997)
- There's Only One Jimmy Grimble (2000)
- Stig of the Dump (2002)
- The Truth About Love (2004)
- The Man-Eating Leopard of Rudraprayag (2005)
- Lost Christmas (2011)
- To Olivia (2021)
- Stephen Fry: Willem & Frieda – Defying the Nazis (2023)

=== As producer ===
- Lost Christmas (2011)
- Girl Power (2014)
- Babes in the Wood (2019)
