= Lost Christmas =

2011 film by John Hay

- Genre: Drama
- Written by: John Hay; David Logan
- Directed by: John Hay
- Starring: Eddie Izzard; Jason Flemyng; Brett Fancy
- Music by: Debbie Wiseman
- Original language: English

Production
- Producer: Elliot Jenkins
- Production locations: Manchester, England
- Cinematography: Graham Frake
- Editor: Matthew Tabern
- Running time: 90 minutes
- Production companies: Impact Film & TV

Original release
- Network: BBC; BBC One HD
- Release: 18 December 2011

Lost Christmas is a 2011 British drama written by David Logan and John Hay and directed by John Hay. It stars Eddie Izzard, Jason Flemyng and Larry Mills. The BBC film, set in Manchester over two Christmases, shows a group of people who are brought together by a mysterious drifter who helps them find what they have lost. It was released on DVD on 5 November 2012.

== Synopsis ==
'Goose' is a 10-year-old boy who on Christmas Eve hides his fireman father's car keys in the hope that he won't leave when called to an emergency rescue. But his mother gets her keys and drives his dad to work, and ten minutes later they are killed in a car crash.

A year later, on Christmas Eve, Goose is living on the streets and supporting himself through petty crime. Goose encounters Anthony, a mysterious man in Manchester. has no memory of his identity or past, but appears to possess unusual knowledge. He demonstrates an ability to locate lost objects.

Everything starts with a lost bangle. This is where 'Anthony' discovers his ability to see what has happened to a person prior to losing what they seek and how they've lost what they desire. He touches a person's hand and sees in his mind their story leading up to the loss of what they are seeking. Despite being lost himself, he has the compulsion and ability to find the lost, uncovering truths that will eventually transform the life of 'Goose' and those affected by his decision. But is 'Anthony's' ability to heal real, or just an illusion?

== Cast ==
- Eddie Izzard as Anthony
- Larry Mills as Goose
- Jason Flemyng as Frank
- Connie Hyde as Linda
- Brett Fancy as Paul
- Sorcha Cusack as Nan
- Adlyn Ross as Lal
- Dwayne Scantlebury as Tagger
- Christine Bottomley as Helen
- Steven Mackintosh as Henry
- Chloe Newsome as Alice
- Geoffrey Palmer as Dr. Clarence
- Jason Watkins as Noel Noble
- Jessie Clayton as Jemma
- Stephen Aintree as Antiques Expert
- Libbi Rubens as Milly
- Robert Lonsdale as unnamed police constable

== Songs ==
- "Wonderful Christmastime" written by Paul McCartney performed by Tom McRae was used in the original TV version, but not the DVD
- "Perfect Christmas" composed for Audio Network by Gledden, Pedder and Dymond, performed by David Ward Maclean

== See also ==
- Programmes set in Manchester
