= There's Only One Jimmy Grimble =

2000 British film

- DVD cover
- Directed by: John Hay
- Written by: Rik Carmichael; Simon Mayle; John Hay
- Produced by: Jeremy Bolt; Bill Godfrey; Claire Hunt; Andrea Calderwood; Alison Jackson; Alexis Lloyd; Sarah Radclyff
- Starring: Robert Carlyle; Lewis McKenzie; Ray Winstone; Jane Lapotaire; Gina McKee; Ben Miller; Samia Ghadie; John Henshaw; Bobby Power
- Distributed by: Pathé Distribution
- Release date: 25 August 2000
- Running time: 106 minutes
- Country: United Kingdom
- Language: English

There's Only One Jimmy Grimble, also known as Jimmy Grimble, is a 2000 British sports comedy drama film directed by John Hay, starring Robert Carlyle, Ray Winstone, Lewis McKenzie, Gina McKee, Ben Miller and Samia Ghadie. Set in Greater Manchester Jimmy is a young aspiring footballer who plays for his school team and after receiving a pair of old football boots that once belonged to one of Manchester City's greatest ever players begins to see his skills on the field change.

The movie has become nostalgically linked to Manchester City, with the movie released in the midst of a golden era for local rivals Manchester United.

== Plot ==
Jimmy, a shy teenager from Oldham and devoted Manchester City fan, faces bullying at school, especially from Manchester United supporters Gordon and Psycho. He joins the school football team, coached by the disheartened Mr Wirral, and befriends Alice, a homeless woman squatting in condemned housing. She gifts Jimmy a pair of old football boots, claiming they once belonged to Robbie Brewer, a former City player, and insists they are magic. Skeptical, Jimmy discards them, but retrieves them just in time for his first match.

Wearing the boots, Jimmy scores a stunning goal from his own half, sparking belief in their magic and boosting his confidence. He quickly becomes the team’s star, overshadowing Gordon. Curious about the boots’ origin, Jimmy discovers that Mr Wirral himself was once a City player who famously scored a hat trick against Manchester United, a fact he had kept hidden due to his disillusionment with football.

As Jimmy’s skills shine, tensions rise. Gordon and his father Ken try to sabotage Jimmy, even throwing the boots into a canal before the final match. Jimmy plays poorly without them, but at halftime, he meets Robbie Brewer, now a blind programme seller, who reveals he never played for City—he was only a mascot—and that Alice was his mother. The boots were a gift from her, not magical at all. Jimmy realizes his talent was always his own. Tragically, he learns that Alice has frozen to death outside her demolished home.

Fueled by this revelation, Jimmy returns to the pitch, scores, assists, and selflessly sets up the winning goal—by kicking the ball off Gordon’s face. After the match, Jimmy rejects an offer from Manchester United, proudly choosing Manchester City instead. He reunites with his mother and former stepfather Harry, kisses his love interest Sara, and celebrates with his teammates and a revitalized Mr Wirral.

== Cast ==
- Robert Carlyle as Eric Wirral
- Ray Winstone as Harry
- Lewis McKenzie as Jimmy Grimble
- Gina McKee as Donna
- Samia Ghadie as Sara
- Jane Lapotaire as Alice Brewer
- Ben Miller as Johnny Two Dogs
- Bobby Power as 'Gorgeous' Gordon Burley
- John Henshaw as Ken Burley
- Ciarán Griffiths as Psycho
- John McArdle as Headmaster
- Sean Delaney as Brick
- Charles Denton as The Cat
- Azmier Ahmed as Elvis
- Michael J. Jackson as Colin
- Jim Whelan as Robbie Brewer
- Dave Hill as United Scout
- Wayne Galtrey as Walkway Kid
- Antony Marsh as Crane
- Ann Aris as Governor 1

== Filming ==
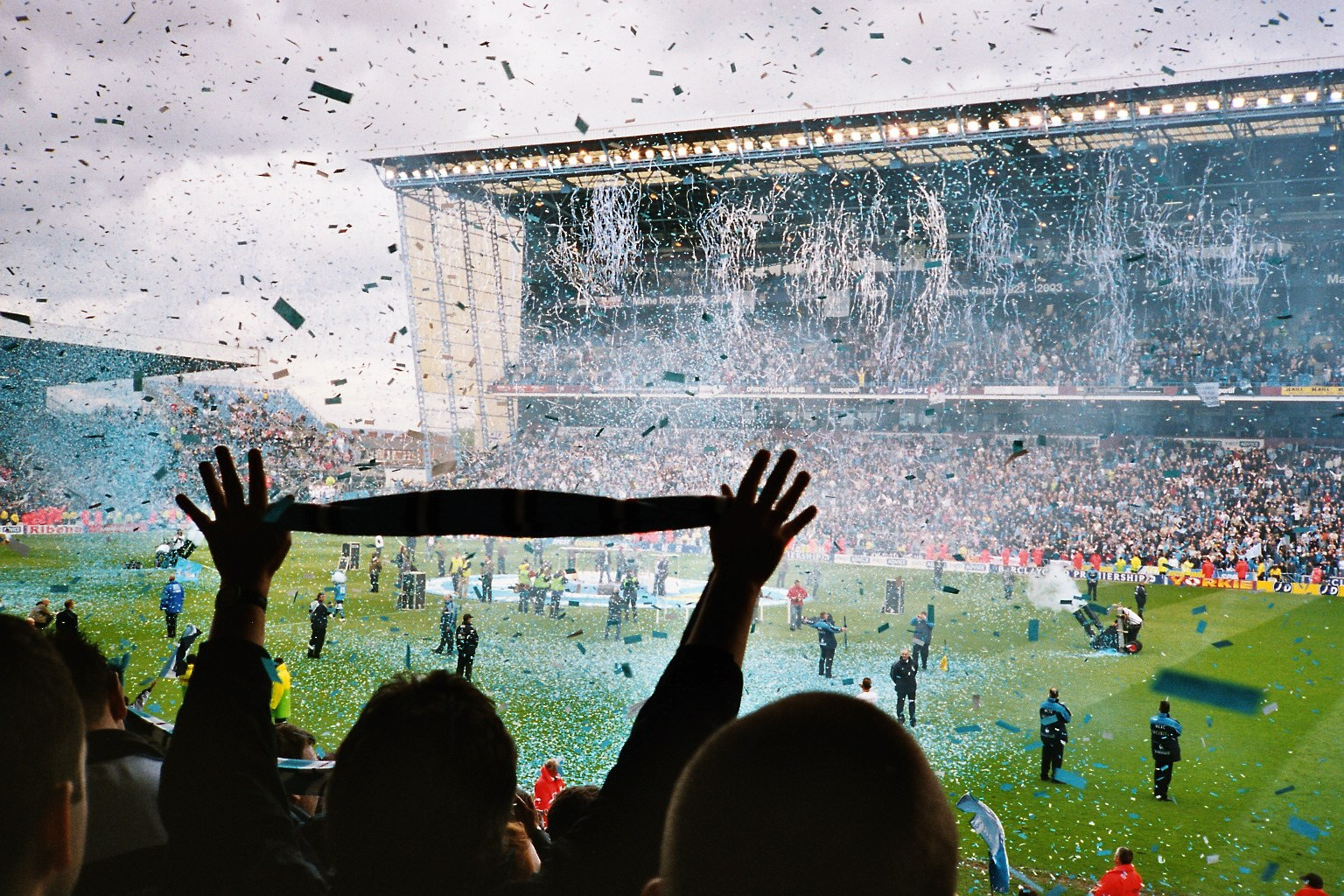
Maine Road, Manchester City's home stadium until 2003.

The movie was filmed in Greater Manchester in 1999, with the final game being shot in Manchester City's former stadium Maine Road. Other prime locations shot were Oldham Hulme Grammar School and Scarisbrick Hall School.

== Release ==
The film was released in the United Kingdom on 25 August 2000 on 127 screens and grossed £101,282 in its opening weekend. It also received screenings at the Berlin International Film Festival on 9 February 2001 and the Kristiansand International Children's Film Festival on 3 May 2001. Later that year it was also released at two more international festivals with showings at Film Fest Ghent and Cinéfest Sudbury International Film Festival.

== Critical response ==
=== Reception ===
The movie at the time of release gained an indifferent reception from critics.

Review aggregator Rotten Tomatoes reported an approval rating of 71% based on 7 reviews, with an average rating of 6.9/10.

Michael Thompson of BBC.com scored it 4 out of 5. Move critic Keith Hennessey-Brown, writing for Eye For Film, commented: "With a plot taken straight from the old comic strip Billy's Boots - albeit given a more realistic spin - I expected this film to seriously suck. Yet I came away thinking it was actually quite good. Yes, it's entirely predictable and done in a check-off-the-clichés way - the underdog has his day, justice is done as the good guys are rewarded and the bad guys punished, etc, etc - but it just plain works. Youngster Lewis McKenzie, who plays Grimble, looks like a real find. Robert Carlyle, Ray Winstone and Gina McKee are a pleasure to watch, as always, as the flawed adults who surround him. It's especially nice to see Winstone cast somewhat against type – this may be the only film he's been in where he doesn't do his violent outburst thing. Complete with a soundtrack of predominantly Manchester bands, there's Only One Jimmy Grimble is an effective feel-good film that successfully accomplishes what it sets out to."

=== Awards and nominations ===
At the Berlin Film Festival, the film won the award for Best Feature Film in the Silver Bear category. At the Giffoni Film Festival, it won the Golden Gryphon Free to Fly Award, with a further award for the Golden Poznan Goat coming at the Ale Kino! International Young Audience Film Festival. Lewis McKenzie was also nominated for the Best Newcomer at the British Independent Film Awards.

=== Legacy ===
In 2018 Football magazine FourFourTwo placed the movie as the 7th of 14 on the best football movies ever. A poll in the same year by SPORTbible asked its readers to vote for their favourite football films, with the movie placing again in 7th place with 1,456 votes.

The movie has become nostalgically linked to Manchester City, with the movie released during the same season City were relegated from the Premier League for a second-time. This coming in the midst of golden era for local rivals Manchester United with Gordon's bullying of Jimmy in the movie mimicking the difference in class between the two football clubs at the time. The movie's most famous line is when Jimmy is asked if he would like to sign for United, only for him to tell the United scout that he's had a better offer. "What could be better than Man United, son?" the scout asks, only for Jimmy to reply "Man City". Ironically Lewis McKenzie who delivered that line and played Jimmy, is himself actually a Manchester United supporter, whereas United bully Gordon played by Bobby Power and his father John Henshaw are real life City supporters.

The movie is mentioned in the school book Access 3 by the German publisher Cornelsen. It is used for studying film analysis in English second language classrooms in Germany.

== See also ==
- Billy's Boots
- List of association football films
