= To Olivia =

- Official poster
- Directed by: John Hay
- Screenplay by: John Hay; David Logan
- Based on: An Unquiet Life by Stephen Michael Shearer
- Produced by: Donall McCusker
- Starring: Hugh Bonneville; Keeley Hawes
- Cinematography: Graham Frake
- Edited by: Colin Goudie
- Music by: Debbie Wiseman
- Production companies: Align; Atticus Pictures; Goldcrest Features
- Distributed by: Sky Cinema
- Release date: 19 February 2021
- Running time: 99 minutes
- Country: United Kingdom
- Language: English

To Olivia (formerly titled An Unquiet Life) is a 2021 British drama film directed by John Hay and starring Hugh Bonneville as Roald Dahl and Keeley Hawes as Patricia Neal. It is based on Stephen Michael Shearer's biography about Neal titled An Unquiet Life. The film features Geoffrey Palmer (as Geoffrey Fisher) in his final acting appearance.

To Olivia was released in the United Kingdom via Sky Cinema on 19 February 2021.

== Plot ==
The film covers Dahl and Neal's marriage as they grapple with the loss of their daughter, Olivia, from encephalitis due to measles.

== Cast ==
- Hugh Bonneville as Roald Dahl
- Keeley Hawes as Patricia Neal
- Sam Heughan as Paul Newman
- Geoffrey Palmer as Geoffrey Fisher
- Conleth Hill as Martin Ritt

== Production ==
=== Casting ===
Bonneville was cast as Dahl in May 2017. Hawes was cast as Neal in November 2019. Heughan was cast as Paul Newman in December 2019.

=== Filming ===
Principal photography began in Surrey on November 14, 2019.

Palmer died in November 2020, but had completed all his scheduled scenes before this time.

== Release ==
The film was released in the United Kingdom via Sky Cinema on 19 February 2021.

In February 2022, it was announced that Vertical Entertainment acquired North American distribution rights to the film, which was released in the United States on April 15, 2022.

== Reception ==
The film has a 60% rating on Rotten Tomatoes based on 30 reviews, with an average of 5.6/10. The website's critics consensus reads, "Burdened with clichés and guilty of glossing over troublesome aspects of its fact-based story, To Olivia can't quite capture the grief it seeks to dramatize." Peter Bradshaw of The Guardian gave the film two out of five stars, complimenting the performances but finding it too reverential and safe. Clarisse Loughrey of The Independent gave it three out of five stars, criticizing its portrayal of Dahl and stating, 'It struggles to reconcile the palpable image of a sensitive family man laid low by depression with the more complicated reality that ran alongside it – that of a sometimes-tyrant with a great capacity for manipulation.'
