= Stephen Fry: Willem & Frieda – Defying the Nazis =

Documentary about the Dutch resistance

- Also known as: Willem and Frieda: A Story of Resistance
- Written by: Rik Carmichael
- Directed by: John Hay
- Presented by: Stephen Fry

Production
- Executive producer: Glenn Kendrick Ackermann
- Running time: 68 minutes

Original release
- Network: Channel 4
- Release: 2 March 2023

Stephen Fry: Willem & Frieda – Defying the Nazis (working title: Willem and Frieda: A Story of Resistance) is a 2023 Channel 4 documentary film presented by Stephen Fry and directed by John Hay. It is about two gay members of the Dutch resistance during the Second World War, Willem Arondeus and Frieda Belinfante.

== Background ==
Stephen Fry first heard of the story of Willem Arondeus and Frieda Belinfante through Willem & Frieda screenwriter Rik Carmichael and the director John Hay. In the documentary, Fry asks why these stories remain untold, both within and beyond the Netherlands, and whether their sexual orientation is the underlying cause for this silence; Gillean Craig in Church Times writes that "Shamefully, after the war, their heroism was — on account of their open homosexuality — airbrushed out of the Netherlands' celebration of wartime resistance. Only recently, with the creation of Amsterdam's pink triangle Homomonument, has their story been told."

== Arondeus and Belinfante ==
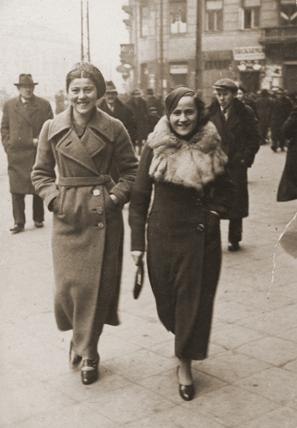
Arondeus in 1943 (left) and Belinfante and her sister Ita Rosenzweig in 1937 (right)

Fry views the Arondeus collection in the Rijksmuseum, Amsterdam. He notes the homoerotic influence of Aubrey Beardsley, a well-known illustrator of Oscar Wilde's work, on Arondeus's art. Arondeus came out as gay aged 17, and was kicked out of his home by his father as a result. He later met Jan Tijssen, a market gardener, with whom he became romantically involved. The two separated in 1941 following a German bomb attack near Arondeus's home. Fry then meets with Boris Dittrich, a Dutch politician and gay rights activist, to discuss Arondeus.

The documentary then discusses Belinfante, who came out as gay early on in life, and soon met Arondeus in Amsterdam. The two meet, and produce forged documents to hide the identity of Jewish people during the Holocaust in the Netherlands. In a 1994 interview that features in the documentary, Belinfante discusses how she disguised herself as a man for three months to avoid Nazi attention, and convinced the brewer Freddy Heineken (of Heineken International) to support the forging process, ultimately saving numerous lives.

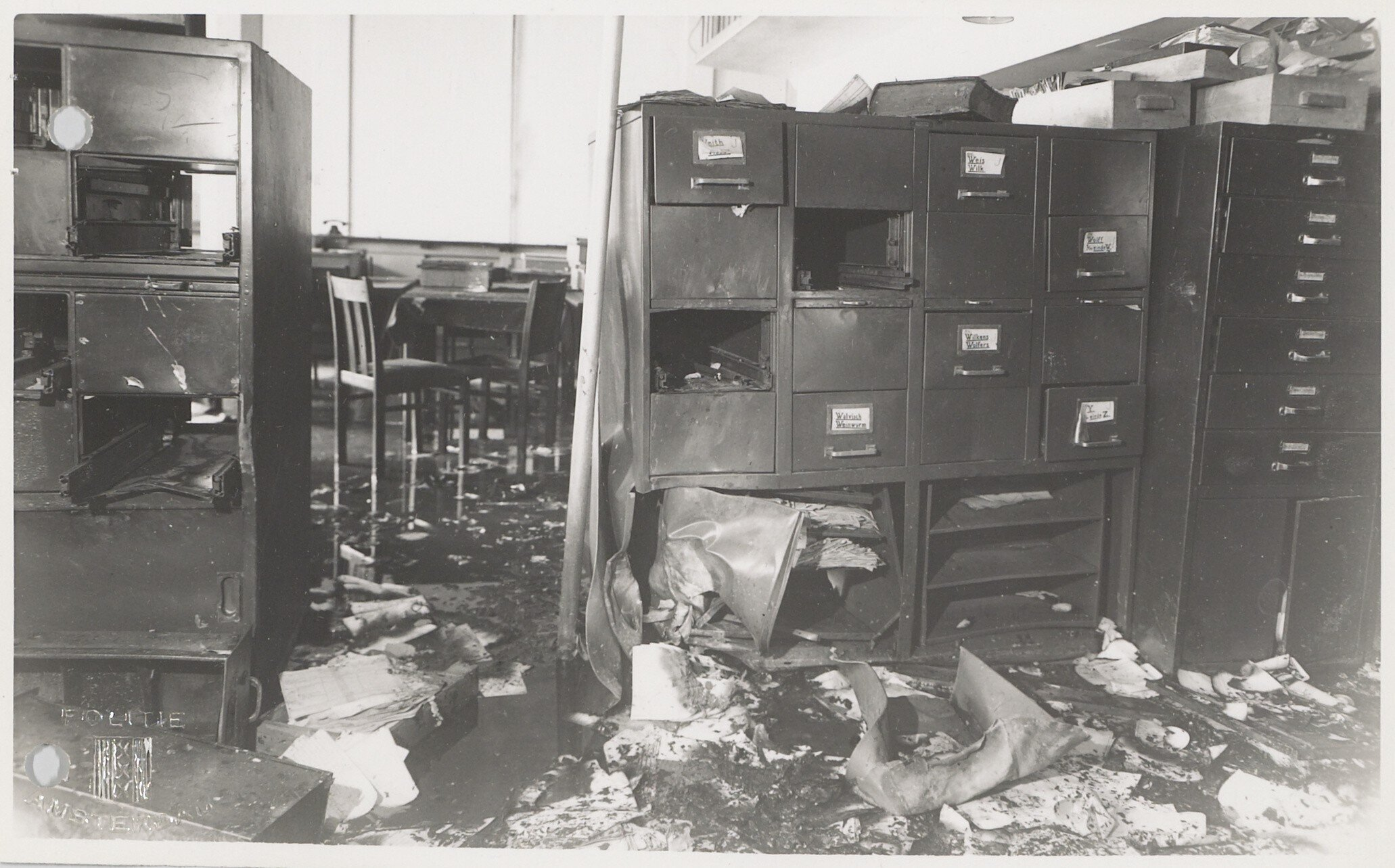
The Amsterdam civil registry office, the day after the bombing

At the time, the Dutch identity card system (persoonsbewijs) was very sophisticated. When the Nazis took over, they would also issue duplicate documents in the Amsterdam civil registry office to prevent forgery. In 1943, Arondeus helped lead the bombing of the civil registry office. For this, Arondeus was put on trial and executed that year.

Tijssen survived the war, and later married a woman and had children – one of his boys was named Willem. Belinfante managed to leave the Netherlands for the United States, where she became a well-known and respected musician in California.

== Reception ==
The documentary was well-received. The Guardian gave the documentary 5 stars, while The Times, The Telegraph and The Jewish Chronicle gave the documentary 4 stars.

== See also ==
- Persecution of homosexuals in Nazi Germany
- Lesbians in Nazi Germany
