= Mike Baldwin (Coronation Street) =

Fictional character from Coronation Street

- Coronation Street character
- Portrayed by: Johnny Briggs
- Duration: 1976–2006
- First appearance: Episode 1642; 11 October 1976
- Last appearance: Episode 6270; 7 April 2006
- Introduced by: Bill Podmore
- Book appearances: Coronation Street: The Complete Saga
- Spin-off appearances: The Life and Loves of Elsie Tanner (1987); Coronation Street: A Christmas Corrie (2012)
In-universe information
- Other names: Michael Vernon Baldwin
- Occupation: Businessman
- Father: Frankie Baldwin
- Mother: Mary Baldwin
- Brothers: Harry Baldwin
- Wife: Susan Barlow (1986–1988); Jackie Ingram (1991–1992); Alma Halliwell (1992–2000); Linda Sykes (2000–2002)
- Sons: Danny Baldwin; Mark Redman; Adam Barlow
- Grandsons: Jamie Baldwin; Warren Baldwin

Mike Baldwin is a fictional character from the British ITV soap opera Coronation Street, played by Johnny Briggs. He first appeared on 11 October 1976 and became one of the show's central characters until his final appearance on 7 April 2006.

== Development ==
Mike started his career as a market stall holder, later becoming a legitimate businessman, running his own factory and namesake denim-maker, Baldwin's Casuals, in Weatherfield. He moved there after ending his relationship with his wife Anne Woodley, establishing himself as the street's most uncompromising employer. Mike was quick to threaten his machinists with "the sack" if they were seen to be slacking or talking out of line.

== Storylines ==
Since his first appearance, Mike had been involved in several of the show's high-profile storylines. This includes a love triangle, where Mike had an affair with local resident Deirdre Barlow (Anne Kirkbride) despite being married to her husband Ken Barlow (William Roache). This led to a longstanding feud between Mike and Ken, with the rivalry between the two dominating storylines over the next two decades. The storyline continued into 1983 winning several ratings featured in UK newspapers. The episode where Deirdre ended her affair with Mike and reconciled with Ken was the show's highest-rated episode at the time. The news were so big that it ended up being announced on the scoreboard during a Manchester United vs Arsenal match at Old Trafford with the words "Ken and Deirdre reunited. Ken 1 – Mike 0", resulting in cheers from the spectators.

=== Relationship with Alma Baldwin ===
Mike and Alma Baldwin's (Amanda Barrie) romance started in 1989; Mike proposed to Alma after her relationship with Ken failed. They wed on-screen in 1992, and the marriage lasted seven years. Several years later, Mike's marriage with Alma was tested when he contemplated going into business partnership with fellow entrepreneur Stephen Reid (Todd Boyce) and was initially unaware that Alma had been smitten with Stephan. But then Stephan attempted to get one over Mike by seducing Alma, who responded by slapping Stephan and reconciling with Mike afterwards.

It was suggested in a 2006 ITV documentary that Mike, an antagonistic womanizing character, met his match in Alma. William Roache, who played Ken Barlow, stated that of all Mike's many women in the serial, he always felt that Alma was Mike's true love. Briggs has stated that he always enjoyed watching the scenes between Mike and Alma, because Alma knew how to handle Mike. Barrie's approach for creating chemistry between their characters was to treat Mike in the same way that she [Barrie] treated Briggs off-set, poking fun at him.

=== Rivalry with Ken Barlow ===
Ken's feud with Mike—spanning over 20 years—began in 1983, when Ken (William Roache) discovered that his wife, Deirdre (Anne Kirkbride), was having an affair with Mike. Initially, Deirdre dated Mike, but then decided Ken suited her better for marriage. Ken and Deirdre soon married, but she turned to Mike when her marriage satisfaction with Ken began to deteriorate. After she had confessed everything to Ken about the affair, Mike turned up on the doorstep in the hope of taking her away; but in the end she decided to stay with Ken after choosing him over Mike. This event began the long-running feud between Mike and Ken, with the two men becoming sworn arch-enemies in the process.

Of the love triangle storyline, Briggs said, "the way it captured the nation was amazing. Everyone was talking about it and the pubs were empty. Men were shouting out: 'Go on Mike, give her one.' People were disappointed when she went back to Ken". The storyline had significant cultural impact, with the press claiming that the country was divided between those who thought Deirdre should remain with Ken, and those who thought she should leave with Mike.

Scriptwriters capitalised on the rivalry between the characters when, in 1986, Mike married Ken's daughter Susan, despite Ken’s strong opposition. Numerous fights between Ken and Mike were featured, and Briggs has suggested that they became famous for their brawls. The first fight between the pair occurred in 1986, when Ken confronted Mike in his factory about Mike's maltreatment of his daughter. Of the confrontation, Briggs has said, "It was a classic – Baldwin getting it in his own territory, the factory. It took a lot to get Ken angry but after the way Mike had treated his daughter, he was furious. He marched into the office and let him have it. This was one of those rare times he caught Mike off-guard." Mike was shown to get revenge on Ken, though it took a further four years before he could do so on-screen.

In 1986, Mike began dating Ken's daughter, Susan Barlow (Wendy Jane Walker)—who was many years his junior—and soon proposed to her. She accepted despite family reservations; when Ken found out about his daughter's relationship with Mike, he confronted him at the factory and punched Mike after telling him "I've had enough of your poisoning in my family—more than enough!!". Ken was further upset to hear about Susan's prospects of marrying Mike, but he reluctantly accepted this after Susan confronted her father about her decision. Mike eventually married Susan in May 1986, but their marriage steadily failed a year later due to the pair having a dispute about their plans for the future. After discovering that Susan was pregnant, Mike wanted her to become a stay-at-home mother. But Susan decided to have an abortion, and moved to Newcastle after Mike broke up with her in response to this.

In a scene which aired in 1990, Mike punched Ken, knocking him over a table in the Rovers Return public house. Briggs has suggested that he and Roache became old hands at doing on-screen fistfights, and that both really enjoyed doing the stunts. According to Briggs, no choreographers were ever used. In 1998, one incident left Briggs with an injury after he fell backwards. Mike also meddled in Ken's subsequent relationships with the latter's old mistress Wendy Crozier (Roberta Kerr) and later with the former's old flame Maggie Redman (Jill Kerman) respectively.

In 1998, Mike clashed with Ken again over Deirdre when the pair learned that she was facing a prison sentence after being implicated by her ex-fiancé Jon Lindsay (Owen Aaronovitch) for his fraudulent activities. But the two rivals were forced to work together and they eventually managed to exonerate Deirdre by exposing Jon's past felony as a bigamist. Coincidentally, Mike's marriage with Alma was in trouble due to him spending less time with her throughout the Deirdre prison scandal. Mike assured Alma that he loved her, but then their marriage ended permanently when he cheated on Alma by having a short-lived fling with his employee Julia Stone when she blackmailed him for large sums of cash. When Alma discovered the betrayal, she confronted Mike and broke up with him; Alma later divorced Mike and thus reverted her identity back to her old maiden name of Halliwell.

Mike and Ken were forced to work together in 2000, when they were featured in a storyline dubbed the "Freshco siege". Ken and Mike were among several series regulars held up at gunpoint in the local supermarket, where Ken had been working as a trolley collector. The episode was broadcast after the 9 pm watershed due to its depiction of violence. Ken and Mike were bound together by armed robbers, which facilitated an end to their feud; Ken helped Mike to combat a panic attack. The pair resolved to put the past behind them; it was a temporary reprieve. Mike had unknowingly fathered a son, Adam (Iain De Caestecker), during his brief marriage to Ken's daughter Susan (Wendy Jane Walker); she kept the baby a secret from him. Mike discovered Adam's existence in 2001; Susan attempted to flee, but was killed in a car accident. Then followed a battle between Mike and Ken for custody of Adam, with Ken adamant that Mike should not look after his grandson. In the end, Mike was awarded custody, but he sent Adam back to his boarding school in Scotland; as his friends were there. However, both Ken and Mike made peace again after promising Alma that they would be nice to each other before she dies.

The result of Susan's departure and the break-up of her marriage with Mike escalated the animosity between him and Ken. This soon continued when Mike later found out Ken had cheated on Deirdre with his mistress Wendy Crozier (Roberta Kerr) and proceeded to taunt Ken about it. Eventually, after Deirdre discovered Ken's betrayal and ended their marriage in 1990, he faced many problems and went in The Rovers Return Inn public house to cope with his troubles. But then Mike taunted Ken in public and provoked him into a fight that ended with the latter's humiliation. Years later, Ken got his life back on track when he met Maggie and began dating her until he learned about her past with Mike. Eventually the couple broke up due to Ken's growing resentment towards Mike.

In her 2003 book, Hobson suggested that Ken "spent at least nineteen years unable to cope with the sense of rejection and betrayal" caused by Mike's and Deirdre's affair. It was suggested in an ITV documentary in 2006 that Ken and Mike's hatred was a clash of cultures: "Barlow the lefty do-gooder versus Baldwin, the cut-and-thrust money grabber." Briggs claimed that Ken was jealous of Mike because he was rich and successful, while Ken was not. Roache claimed that the reason Ken disliked Mike was because he was a self-centred and self-made individual.

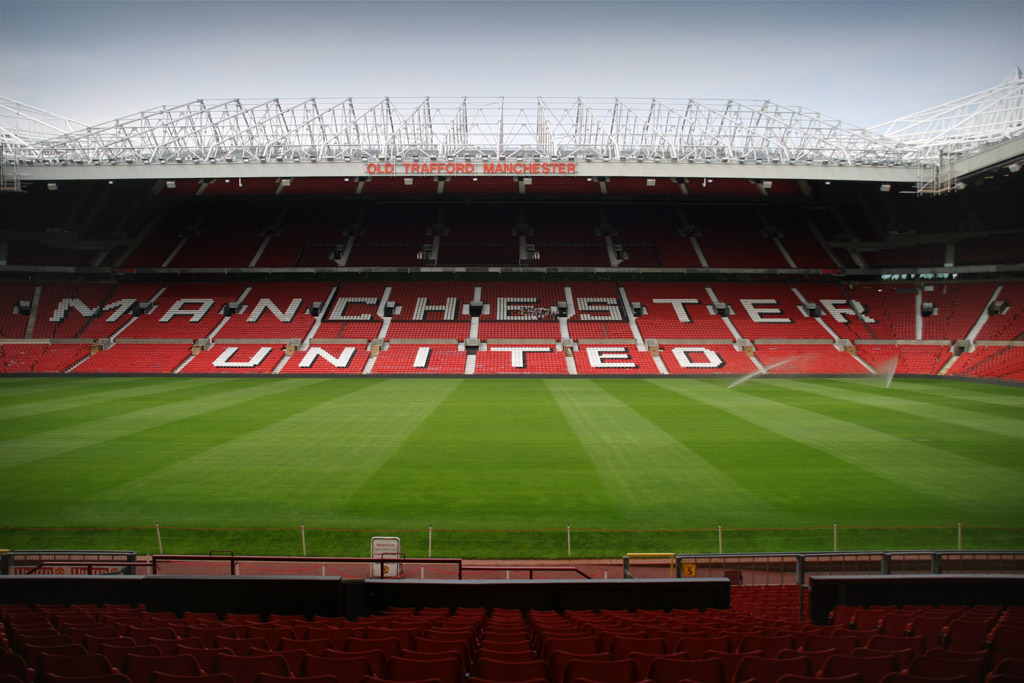
Old Trafford football ground. In 1983, fans watching the match were informed that Deirdre was staying with Ken when the scoreboard flashed "Ken 1, Mike 0".

Ultimately the rivalry came to an end on-screen in 2006, when Briggs quit the role of Mike. Mike was killed-off, dying of Alzheimer's disease; he died in Ken's arms. In the final scenes, a disoriented and dying Mike was found wandering the streets by Ken, and as Ken cradled Mike in his arms, the rivals talked about old times before Mike died, signifying the end of their 20-year feud.

To promote Mike's final scenes, Radio Times released a series of photographs with Ken and Mike re-enacting Arthur Devis's (1807) painting of the death of Horatio Nelson—Baldwin was shown surrounded by his nearest and dearest during his final moments, with Ken prominently positioned next to him, taking on the role of Captain Hardy, Nelson's trusted colleague to whom Nelson famously uttered "Kiss me" before he died. Producer Maire Tracey said, "The fact that Mike dies in Ken's arms says it all. For most of Mike's life, it was his battles with Ken that kept him going. Like two cowboys, they spent their lives sizing each other up. Behind the scenes, Bill Roache has even suggested to Johnny Briggs that they should make a version of Brokeback Mountain for the two elderly cowboys. Both Ken and Mike will miss the bust-ups." In October 2019, Adam discussed Mike's death with Ken and noted the irony of Mike dying in Ken's arms, given the fierce rivalry the two men shared over the preceding decades.

=== Don Brennan ===
While Ken stood out as his sworn archenemy and longtime rival, Mike did establish some major feuds with a number of other characters—most notably with taxi driver Don Brennan (Geoffrey Hinsliff). The conflict between them started when Mike humiliated Don in a poker game between them and then several years later tricked the latter into buying a garage at an overrated price; Don consequently went bankrupt and he squarely blamed Mike for his losses. Later on, Don confronted Mike in the pub and attempted to punch him; Mike dodged it and humiliated Don by punching him back. By 1997, Don's final year on the show, the quarrel between both men had intensified as Don sought to get revenge on Mike. At one point Don vandalised what he believed to be Mike's car, only to later find out that it was somebody else's vehicle. Don then broke into Mike's factory and set the building on fire. However, Don's plan backfired as he destroyed evidence that would have led to Mike facing police charges of counterfeiting his products. Thereafter Mike was acquitted from police investigation and he received an insurance claim that financially saved his business from liquidation, thereby allowing Mike to reinstate his business into an underwear factory called "Underworld". Don, enraged by his failure to get revenge on Mike, decided to target Alma by kidnapping her in his taxi while her husband was taking his solicitor for dinner. Alma's plight culminated dramatically when Don tried to kill her by driving the taxi into a canal, but they both survived the crash and Don was held in police custody whilst Mike comforted Alma over the ordeal. Several months later, however, Don escaped and resolved to kill Mike at all costs. Don soon ambushed Mike in the factory and attempted to beat him to death, but was interrupted and forced to flee. Mike then rushed outside to find Don inside Alma's car, intending to run him over. Don drove the car at Mike, who ducked out of the way in time; Don crashed the car into the viaduct and was killed when the vehicle exploded as Mike watched on along with many other residents.

=== Marriage to Linda ===
Unable to win Alma back, Mike began to romantically settle himself with loud-mouthed machinist Linda Sykes (Jacqueline Pirie). It seemed as though the pair formed a romantic interest in each other, but it turned out Linda was only interested in Mike for his fortune. Then Mike's long-lost son Mark Redman (Paul Fox), the product of Mike's past fling with Maggie, came to Weatherfield to settle himself in the street.

Mike steadily bonded with Mark and took him on at the factory as manager. Soon enough, Mike's relationships with both Mark and Linda had developed, but little did he know that Mark and Linda would end up having an affair when she seduced his son behind his back. Mike eventually married Linda, but then he learned about her affair with his son after Mark revealed the truth to him. When he confronted the pair over the betrayal, Mike was tricked by Linda into believing that Mark had been pursuing her and that she tried to end their affair—when in reality, it had been the other way round; Linda was the one pursuing Mark behind his father's back. But in the end Mike believed Linda and forgave her, disowning Mark as a result. A month later, Mike was held hostage alongside Ken and many other residents in a supermarket siege; the crisis ended when the gunman, Linda's brother Ryan, was killed. After this, Mike comforted Linda over her loss despite the ordeal.

By mid-2001, Mike's marriage with Linda seemed to have improved. But trouble soon reemerged when Alma returned and told Mike that she was dying of cervical cancer. At this point, he realised that marrying Linda was a mistake and resolved to spend time with Alma in her last few days of life; Linda grew unhappy with this and so slept with Mike's new business associate Harvey Ruben in retribution. When Mike found out what Linda had done, he admitted that Alma was dying and slapped Linda when she reacted indifferently to the news. Mike threatened to end his marriage to Linda, but eventually agreed to give her one more chance following Alma's funeral. Alma had died after spending time with her loved ones, including Mike. Before she died, though, Alma learned that Mike had disowned Mark and persuaded him to make peace with his son in her honour; Mike agreed to this and Mark went to visit his father on the day Linda's mother, Eve Sykes (Melanie Kilburn), was due to marry his best friend, Fred Elliott (John Savident), at the same church where Mike and Linda got married a year before. However, Mike later overheard Linda taunting Mark over their past affair and how she managed to trick his father into believing her over his son. This caused Mike to realise that Mark was telling the truth about Linda all along, and he responds by breaking up with Linda after confronting her over the extent of her lies and deceit. Afterwards, Linda disappeared mysteriously and Mike was accused of murdering her; he was soon questioned by the police on suspicion of murder, but the charges were quickly dropped when Linda was found in Ireland with a new man.

=== Brief relationships ===
In another major storyline, Mike had a short-lived marriage of convenience with his second spouse Jackie Ingram (Shirin Taylor; he inherited a factory from her late husband Peter—the latter of whom had died of a heart attack during an argument with Mike over their past as business competitors. However, Mike's marriage with Jackie lasted just one week when she discovered his ulterior motives; Jackie responded by breaking up with Mike and threatening him with a shotgun if he did not get out of her sight.

As such Mike also had a brief relationship with florist Maggie Dunlop (Jill Kerman). Problems for the pair soon emerged when Maggie became pregnant and she eventually ended things with him after Mike refused to buy the florist she worked at. She married Harry Redman shortly before the birth of her son, Mark. The Redmans moved away, and Mike did not see Mark for years.

=== Alzheimer's diagnosis ===
Towards the end of 2005, Mike was diagnosed with Alzheimer's disease at the age of 63. He soon split from his fiancée, Penny King (Pauline Fleming). He also went into The Rovers Return and asked where his old flame, Bet Lynch (Julie Goodyear), was; failing to remember that she had left the pub 10 years prior. A further misunderstanding caused him to become estranged from Adam. Soon after, Danny engineered sole inheritance of Mike's empire at the behest of his girlfriend, Leanne Battersby (Jane Danson).

In 2006, Mike's condition had rapidly deteriorated to the point where he was admitted to the hospital with pneumonia in early April. However, Mike escaped and made his way back to his factory on Coronation Street, where his old rival, Ken, found him. Shortly afterward, Mike collapsed and died in Ken's arms after suffering a massive heart attack at 64 years old. His passing, like that of Alma in 2001, was respected by omitting the theme tune over the end credits, though a continuity announcement was made instead. His last words were, "You're finished, Barlow. Deirdre loves me; she's mine." Over the last few months of his life, he had constantly confused the past with the present; Alma, his beloved former wife who died in 2001, was often mentioned, as was Bet. In 2006, he even broke into Bet's former home, only to be confronted by Leanne's father, Les (Bruce Jones) as he was the current tenant.

=== Reappearance ===
Mike would posthumously reappear in a 2012 short special episode shown as part of Text Santa; with the character appearing as a ghost sent from Hell to give Ken's next-door neighbour, Norris Cole (Malcolm Hebden), a warning to change his ways.

== Reception ==
Journalist Johann Hari, writing for The Independent, heaped praise upon Mike's dementia storyline: "You can see some of these qualities in the storyline that has just stuttered to a close—the tale of the cracking and breaking of wide-boy Street stalwart Mike Baldwin into dementia and death. A soap can do Alzheimer's perfectly because it can draw on the collected memories of its audience in a way no other art form, except perhaps the epic novel, can. When Mike loses it and starts crying for Alma—the ex-wife who died years ago—we remember her too. When we see him breaking from his dementia-fever for a moment and asking his old flame Deirdre to dance—an almost unimaginably sad scene, as he beams in mid-dance and says: 'This is lovely', while she quietly weeps over his shoulder—the performances are layered with literally decades of shared experience." In 2008, All About Soap included Mike's Alzheimer's plot in its list of the "top ten taboo" storylines of all time. Their writer described it as one of the "taboos which have bravely been broken by soaps."

Grace Dent, writing for The Guardian, heaped similar praise on the storyline as she paid tribute to the legendary character: "So, farewell Mike Baldwin. Laid on the cobbles in front of the Kabin, this week Mike took his last breaths, clutched to the breast of his nemesis Ken Barlow, witnessed by Rita and Emily, both neighbours of 30 years. A peculiarly fitting end to the cockney king of knickers. He'll be sadly missed. No more Mike Baldwin in his Edinburgh Woollen Mill golfing jerseys and smart-casual slacks, sneaking a fine single malt and a lamb hotpot. No more clashes with Fizz over shoddy stitching, or scanning the obituaries for wealthy widows to woo. No more boozy afternoons at the 19th hole. Literally the end of an era. Although Mike's decline from Alzheimer's was bleak and harrowing, there were bittersweet moments to his final days: Imaginary meetings with Bet Lynch, Alma Halliwell and his mother; Chess with Chesney; and a day out in town with old flame Deirdre. The time, at last, to watch Ready Steady Cook and wear pyjamas until tea-time."
