= Life Force (TV series) =

British television series

- Opening titles
- Genre: Science fiction; Drama; Thriller
- Developed by: Peter Tabern
- Written by: Rik Carmichael; Greg McQueen; John Hay; Peter Tabern
- Directed by: Justin Chadwick; Lorne Magory; Peter Tabern
- Starring: Paul Fox; Julia Haworth; Pablo Duarte; Sarah Hollis; Damian Lewis
- Music by: Ian Hughes
- Country of origin: United Kingdom
- Original language: English
- No. of seasons: 1
- No. of episodes: 13

Production
- Producer: Peter Tabern
- Cinematography: Nick Dance
- Editors: Matthew Tabern; Michael Latham
- Running time: 25 minutes
- Production company: Childsplay Productions

Original release
- Network: ITV (CITV)
- Release: 10 January – 9 April 2000

Life Force is a British science fiction children's television series broadcast in 2000 on ITV. Produced by Childsplay Productions for CITV, the series was devised and produced by Peter Tabern, who wrote and directed its episodes alongside co-writers Rik Carmichael, John Hay, and Greg McQueen, and directors Lorne Magory and Justin Chadwick. Set in a post-apocalyptic future, in which global warming has drowned vast swathes of the planet and left its remains in chaos, four children, two possessing psychic powers, are hunted by an oppressive government.

Life Force ran for one 13-episode series on UK television, and was also shown in Australia during the early 2000s. Greeted with viewer complaints, disjointed scheduling, and unsatisfactory ratings on its original broadcasts by ITV, in spite of it receiving critical acclaim, the series has not been commercially released or repeated since.

== Overview ==
In the year 2025, global warming has caused severe weather conditions, melting the polar ice caps and consequently flooding Earth in an event known as "The Drowning". Navigated by a network of boats, the former United Kingdom is reduced to a mere archipelago, with the Lake District renamed the "Cumbrian Sea", and Cumbrian Mountains now "Black Combe Island". The remaining oppressive factions of its federal government employ "The Commission", a task force agency who outlaw migrant 'climeys' (climate refugees), 'senders' (new genetically engineered psychic humans possessing telepathic and telekinetic powers, evidenced by glowing gold-yellow eyes), and the practise of all science, cruelly tracking the activities of remaining civilians. Their objective is to blame and take away the scientists who had tried to prevent the drowning of the planet from occurring, as well as to harvest 'senders'.

In the aftermath of the climate disaster, young siblings Greg and Karen Webber are left to fend for themselves on Black Combe Island. Their parents, Amy and Richard, are arrested and imprisoned by The Commission following the discovery of their work teaching science at the island's school in the hopes of raising a new generation of physicists, and involvement in Greenwatch, an underground environmental pressure collective composed of the remaining ecologic scientists across the world, communicating through intermittently available satellite links.

Greg and Karen team up and attempt to continue their efforts alongside Mai-Li Cheung and Ash Karnak, two particularly able 'sender' children with whom their parents had been teaching, and Goodman, an old Greenwatch campaigner and family friend acting as their guardian. Kurt Glemser, a malevolent 'sender' agent working for The Commission, pursues the children as they investigate and try to solve issues caused by the disaster; helping and protecting the lives of those who have been endangered by the chaos of the new climate perils that have developed.

== Production and broadcast ==
Life Force was in production for more than three years during the latter part of the 1990s. Its budget was reportedly around $3.8 million. The series was made for ITV by independent production company Childsplay Productions, whose previous works had included 1993's Eye of the Storm. Similar to Eye of the Storm, it was devised by producer Peter Tabern as an environmentally-conscious children's drama series; however, Life Force would portray the aftermath of an ecological disaster with a science fiction slant and episodic format, instead of more fantasy-led elements making the issue an overarching threat throughout the former serial.

All but two weeks of filming for Life Force took place between March and August 1999 in Horwich, Bolton. The area was chosen for its derelict atmosphere and factory, with numerous Grade II-listed stone mills surrounding it; a search was initially made in London, but according to Tabern, none of the locations could convey the intended on-screen geography. Employees of the Arcon Engineering factory, as well as their relatives, were subsequently offered smaller roles and used as extras in crowds. During a period in which water levels fell, sequences being filmed at Bolton reservoirs were instead briefly made at Loch Lomond, Scotland.

While in production, Life Force was first previewed and illustrated for a two-page report in the September 1999 edition of Televisual magazine. Further advance coverage was given by TV Zone. In the weeks leading up to its premiere, the series was promoted as part of new weekday schedules for the start of 2000. Lead actors Sarah Hollis and Pablo Duarte additionally appeared to be interviewed as studio guests during in-vision presentation links for CITV in December 1999.

Beginning on 10 January 2000, Life Force was first broadcast during Monday afternoons at 4:35 pm, within the CITV children's programming strand on ITV1 in the United Kingdom. These airings were pulled after the fourth episode, and from 13 February onward the remainder of the series was only shown in a 9:50 am Sunday morning slot where previous editions had been repeated. Episodes were also reportedly given repeat airings during Tuesday afternoons on ITV2.

In Australia, Life Force was acquired by ABC for ABC Kids. ITEL, at that time newly under United News & Media, was the programme's international distributor.

== Cast and characters ==
From the programme's official website and BFI entries:

- Damian Lewis as Kurt Glemser
- Sarah Hollis as Mai-Li Cheung
- Pablo Duarte as Ash Karnak
- Paul Fox as Greg Webber
- Julia Haworth as Karen Webber
- Kelly Hunter as Amy Webber
- Valentine Pelka as Richard Webber
- David Mallinson as Goodman
- Tara Pendergast as Lindsay
- Oliver Hamilton as Sam
- Antonia Corrigan as Madeline
- Sarah Lam as Sally Cheung
- David MacCreedy as Sergeant
- David Bellas as Steve Fellside
- Glyn Grain as Harry Fellside
- Helen Griffin as Gwyneth
- Natasha Hodgson as Gemma
- Pauline McLynn as Polly Phemus
- Tam Dean Burn as Retro
- Nicholas Blane as Scuzz
- Ruddy L. Davis as Christie
- Lewis McKenzie as Joshua
- Larissa Kouznetsova as Dr. Galina Renkova
- Jemima Rooper as Siren
- Amanda Walker as Hepzibah McKinley
- Simon Chandler as Professor Peterson
- Samia Ghadie as Marianne
- Peter Lorenzelli as Jeweller
- Will Haigh as Luke
- David Fleeshman as John Spencer
- Nicholas Moss as Sergeant Callow
- Matt Hickey as Skylar
- Richard Heap as Silhouette Man

== Episodes ==
No.	Title	Directed by	Written by	Original release date
1	"The Girl Who Flipped"	Justin Chadwick	Peter Tabern	January 10, 2000
In the year 2025, global warming has caused the polar ice caps to melt and the sea to rise, flooding large swathes of land on Earth. Richard and Amy Webber, members of underground environmental pressure group Greenwatch, teach science at a school on Black Combe Island in the Western String of the Cumbrian Sea, hoping to raise a new generation of physicists that can fix the planet. Amy discovers that two of her students, Mai-Li and Ash, possess advanced, genetically-engineered telepathic and telekinetic abilities like hers, with the former able to 'flip', turning a tennis ball inside out. However, she is also concerned for their safety in the face of ruthless federal government task force The Commission and its telepath agent Kurt Glemser, who have taken away others of their kind.
2	"Greenwatch"	Justin Chadwick	Peter Tabern	January 17, 2000
Richard and Amy are arrested in a raid on the school dictated by The Commission and Glemser, leaving their own children, Greg and Karen, to fend for themselves. They join Ash and Mai-Li to find Goodman, an old associate of the Webbers, at his laboratory within a derelict mill. Goodman becomes their guardian and recounts the history of Greenwatch, explaining to them how its outlawed scientists have been blamed by the government for causing the disaster they had tried to prevent, but soon falls sick from his underlying illness. The children have to return to the raided school with caution and trepidation, attempting to find medicine to treat him.
3	"On The Run"	Justin Chadwick	Rik Carmichael	January 24, 2000
Back at The Commission's headquarters, Glemser forcibly interrogates an imprisoned Amy in a malevolent attempt to locate and arrest the missing 'sender' children. Amy tries to send a warning message to Mai-Li for them to escape through her own telepathic abilities, but she is too late; eventually realising that herself and Ash are in imminent danger, Mai-Li is then faced with hacking into Goodman's mind and altering his memories before Glemser forces him to betray her too.
4	"Greenhouse Effect"	Lorne Magory	Peter Tabern	January 31, 2000
Goodman is requested to treat an aggressive Japanese leaf worm disease that has apparently broken out on a farm, affecting its crops. After the group arrive, it transpires that the unscrupulous owner of the farm, Harry Fellside, is using illegal, highly toxic nerve agent chemicals to promote the growth of his plants, and ruthlessly forcing his captured 'climeys' (climate refugees) that have fled from a similarly-flooded France into brutal lives of slave labour exploitation.
5	"The Village That Dreamed Itself to Death"	Lorne Magory	Peter Tabern	February 13, 2000
The children pick up a sudden nearby distress signal from the small Loppergarth Island on their boat. Responding to the call, they sail out to find its village completely deserted with no apparent population living there, save for Gemma, a disturbed, sleep-deprived ten-year-old girl who is constantly running around the streets and erratically scrawling a strange, recurring anarchy symbol-like drawing, following one whole week of compulsively attempting to keep herself awake.
6	"Yesterday Island"	Peter Tabern	Rik Carmichael	February 20, 2000
Having run out of fuel while at sea, the children are given no choice but to moor their boat on the nearest possible island. While there, they discover space dedicated to parts of the time before the floods, looked after by a strange middle-aged woman with an electric eye socket named Polly Phemus. Upon trying out her virtual reality video games, it becomes clear she is attempting to trap them, and the group strive to break out of the virtual world and get back to real life.
7	"Beware of the Dog"	Lorne Magory	John Hay	February 27, 2000
In need of an old car part to power Goodman's broken electricity generator, Ash and Greg travel to the Cartmel scrap market, where goods are now bought by civilians in exchange for euros or bartering items of value with each other. The boys find the part available for sale, however its owner demands an unviable return. They instead decide to try their luck at Devil's Island, a mound of land largely consisting of a giant scrapyard with a dangerous reputation. While looking around the deserted site, they discover that it is inhabited by numerous feral, mutant dog-like children of varying morality, living as a pack among the vast waste.
8	"Return to Sender"	Justin Chadwick	Greg McQueen	March 5, 2000
Joshua, a young 'sender' who has been arrested by The Commission, appears to go missing while under their authorised escort transference. Now a fugitive seemingly looking for help from the children, it is eventually revealed that the boy and the Greenwatch personal computer have been programmed with a life-threatening psychic virus by Dr. Galina Renkova, developed by her with malicious intent to make the telepaths progressively attack and destroy one another.
9	"Siren Song"	Peter Tabern	Rik Carmichael	March 12, 2000
Greg sets off to replenish the group's supplies of a vital plant ingredient needed for sunblock, essential in the new climate. During his search trip, he meets a mysterious, attractive brunette, Siren, who appears to have the plant he needs. Through her, Greg finds himself caught up in the sinister activities of a strange sun-worshipping cult, who are determined to put a stop to people they perceive to be 'interfering' with nature and what is seen to be its natural course.
10	"Paradise Island"	Justin Chadwick	Peter Tabern	March 19, 2000
Greg takes a bored Mai-Li and Ash on a boat tour around the nearby islands to avoid staying cooped up indoors. They subsequently receive a morse code message from Paradise Island. Heading there, they discover and attempt to help old island resident Hepzibah McKinley, a scientist who claims to have discovered the secret of cold fusion, and is continuing her father's incomplete research into the subject to try and create greater sources of energy for the remnants of the world.
11	"Age Before Beauty"	Lorne Magory	Greg McQueen	March 26, 2000
Greg and Mai-Li investigate an empty dinghy, drifting away in the sea. Suddenly drugged and kidnapped, Greg wakes up in a house with no memory of the prior events, and a young girl, Marianne, tells him that he was found floating alone. Unbeknownst to Greg while he is looked after, her father, Professor Peterson, plots to experiment with and ultimately sacrifice a captive Mai-Li in an attempt to cure his daughter of the rapid-ageing condition that she is actually suffering from.
12	"No Quick Fix"	Peter Tabern	Greg McQueen	April 2, 2000
Goodman takes Ash to the Cartmel scrap market for video spares. While there, he meets Luke, a fellow 'sender', and is lured to fall in with Skylar, a Fagin-like crook who convinces senders to steal for him. In return, Skylar provides them with 'tags', dangerous chemical strip patches that stimulate and enhance their special abilities at the risk of serious side effects. Ash becomes addicted to these, concerning his friends and coming perilously close to burnout and health complications.
13	"The Thought Fish"	Lorne Magory	Peter Tabern	April 9, 2000
Amy appears to escape from The Commission's headquarters, and in an attempt to be reunited with her colleagues and family makes her way back to their base. However, she starts to show more unusual concern for the current whereabouts of the two 'senders', instead of her own children.

== Critical response and legacy ==
The first four airings of Life Force in its original Monday afternoon CITV timeslot were said to receive numerous viewer complaints and calls for it to be removed, with concerns over what was perceived as graphic imagery for audiences of the programming strand. A scene in which a child impaled a pencil through their hand is alleged to have caused particular controversy. Following a near-two-week period in which no new episodes were shown, the remainder of the series was moved to instead broadcast on Sunday mornings. Previous editions had been repeated there in an attempt to create word of mouth during the preceding weeks.

In part due to its shift to mornings, Life Force underperformed in the schedules. With its afternoon slot replaced by Sabrina the Teenage Witch, producer Peter Tabern publicly criticized ITV, blaming the move on "the timidness of broadcasters" and accusing them of not making it clear to viewers. Tabern also claimed then-controller of ITV children's and youth programming Nigel Pickard had reneged on an unwritten mutual agreement over its scheduling, despite him being "a fan" of the show, and initially intending it to be one of his commissions during 2000 to appeal towards older children alongside the final series of Children's Ward.

A second series of Life Force was subsequently never ordered by ITV, leaving the final episode's open-ended conclusion and several plot aspects unresolved. Since its original broadcasts in the UK and Australia, the existing episodes have not been commercially released. Though remaining obscure, scarcely-seen, and a subject of viewer complaints at the time, the programme was critically acclaimed in contemporary reviews, and has been given positive retrospective assessments, being cited as a 'quality' example in British television literature, including in a children's sci-fi/fantasy-focused piece part of Screenonline, and The Hill and Beyond, an encyclopaedic overview of the country's children's drama output, both by Doctor Who Magazine contributor Alistair McGown for the BFI.
