= Adam's Family Tree =

- Genre: Children's Comedy, Fantasy
- Country of origin: United Kingdom
- Original language: English
- No. of seasons: 3
- No. of episodes: 20

Production
- Producer: Yorkshire Television
- Running time: 27 minutes

Original release
- Network: ITV (CITV)
- Release: 6 January 1997 – 19 February 1999

Adam's Family Tree is a British children's television comedy programme that was first broadcast on 6 January 1997 and ran until 19 February 1999. The show was broadcast on CITV, the children's segment of ITV. The show was filmed in Yorkshire and ran for three series and 20 episodes.

The premise of the show was that 12-year-old Adam was able to call upon his ancestors from throughout history to help him solve everyday problems. The title character was played by Anthony Lewis for the first two series, before the role was taken over by Alex Cooke.

== Cast ==
- Anthony Lewis as Adam (series 1–2)
- Alex Cooke as Adam (series 3)
- Samia Ghadie as Jane (series 1–2)
- Lauren Brown as Jane (series 3)
- Jacqueline Naylor as Adam's mother
- Bill Speed as Adam's father
- Kate Dove as Mrs Copstick
- Judith Davis as Mrs Rocket
- John Biggins as Mr Blah
- Mark Hearne as Browny
- Shane Bullers as Whitey
- Alex Carter as Greeny
- Richard Finn as Geoff (Purpley)
- Jonathon Morris as Whip (Series 2, Episode 11 - "Singing with the Reins")

== Episodes ==
Series	Episodes	Originally released	
Series	Episodes	First released	Last released
1	6	6 January 1997	10 February 1997
2	7	5 January 1998	16 February 1998
3	7	8 January 1999	19 February 1999

=== Series 1 (1997) ===
No. overall	No. in series	Title	Directed by	Written by	Original release date
1	1	"I'm the Urban Caveman"	Colin Nobbs	Neil Armstrong & Brian Walsh	6 January 1997
2	2	"The Silence of the Hams"	Richard Callanan & Colin Nobbs	Neil Armstrong & Brian Walsh	13 January 1997
3	3	"Two Knights in the Night"	Richard Callanan & Colin Nobbs	Neil Armstrong & Brian Walsh	20 January 1997
4	4	"Any Witch Way"	Richard Callanan & Colin Nobbs	Neil Armstrong & Brian Walsh	27 January 1997
5	5	"'Ello, 'Ello"	Richard Callanan & Colin Nobbs	Neil Armstrong & Brian Walsh	3 February 1997
6	6	"Strawberry Fools Forever"	Richard Callanan & Colin Nobbs	Neil Armstrong & Brian Walsh	10 February 1997

=== Series 2 (1998) ===
No. overall	No. in series	Title	Directed by	Written by	Original release date
7	1	"See You Later, Gladiator"	Richard Callanan & Colin Nobbs	Neil Armstrong & Brian Walsh	5 January 1998
8	2	"The Irate Pirate"	Richard Callanan & Colin Nobbs	Neil Armstrong & Brian Walsh	12 January 1998
9	3	"Hassles with Castles"	Richard Callanan & Colin Nobbs	Neil Armstrong & Brian Walsh	19 January 1998
10	4	"Herbal Kate and the Disco Date"	Richard Callanan & Colin Nobbs	Neil Armstrong & Brian Walsh	26 January 1998
11	5	"Singing with the Reins"	Richard Callanan & Colin Nobbs	Neil Armstrong & Brian Walsh	2 February 1998
12	6	"The Daily Femail"	Richard Callanan & Colin Nobbs	Neil Armstrong & Brian Walsh	9 February 1998
13	7	"A Glow in the Dark Ages"	Richard Callanan & Colin Nobbs	Neil Armstrong & Brian Walsh	16 February 1998

=== Series 3 (1999) ===
No. overall	No. in series	Title	Directed by	Written by	Original release date
14	1	"I've Got a Clone to Pick with You"	Richard Callanan & Colin Nobbs	Neil Armstrong & Brian Walsh	8 January 1999
15	2	"Ma's Attack"	Richard Callanan & Colin Nobbs	Neil Armstrong & Brian Walsh	15 January 1999
16	3	"How the West Was Sung"	Richard Callanan & Colin Nobbs	Neil Armstrong & Brian Walsh	22 January 1999
17	4	"There's Nothing Like a Dane"	Richard Callanan & Colin Nobbs	Neil Armstrong & Brian Walsh	29 January 1999
18	5	"A Turnip for the Books"	Richard Callanan & Colin Nobbs	Neil Armstrong & Brian Walsh	5 February 1999
19	6	"Here Comes the Hun"	Richard Callanan & Colin Nobbs	Neil Armstrong & Brian Walsh	12 February 1999
20	7	"A Cavalier Spirit"	Richard Callanan & Colin Nobbs	Neil Armstrong & Brian Walsh	19 February 1999
