= Zoë Henry =

British actress

- Born: Essex, England
- Occupation: Actress
- Years active: 1997-present
- Known for: Coronation Street; Emmerdale; EastEnders
- Spouse: Jeff Hordley (m. 2003)
- Children: 2

Zoë Henry is a British actress, known for her roles in four soap operas on British television; Emmerdale, Doctors, Coronation Street, and EastEnders. She has also made appearances in various other television series including Grafters and Conviction.

== Career ==
Henry won the Manchester Evening News 'Best Actress in a leading role' title in the Manchester Metropolitan University School of Theatre's production of Pygmalion for Eliza Doolittle in 2002.

Henry's early career began with a small role in the first episode of Cold Feet, as well as playing the character Emma in Grafters. She also starred in Dalziel and Pascoe, before securing a role in as the new vet, Rhona Goskirk in ITV soap Emmerdale. She also starred in the film Seeing Red alongside Sarah Lancashire. Henry played the character for a month in 2001, before returning for eight months in 2002. After her departure from Emmerdale, Henry she was able to get minor roles in dramas, including The Bill, A Touch of Frost, Casualty, and Doctors. She landed a leading role, of Beth Caffrey, in the BBC drama Conviction. After this, Henry appeared between March and September 2007 in another ITV soap, Coronation Street. In this she played Casey Carswell, the child-abducting friend of Claire Peacock. She had previously played Log Thwaite, a friend of Spider Nugent's, for six episodes in 1998.

She later went on to appear in EastEnders in 2009 as police officer Detective Constable Deanne Cunningham, investigating the discovery of character Trina Johnson's corpse.

It was announced in early 2010 that Henry would be reprising her role of Rhona Goskirk in Emmerdale. The character returned, and immediately rekindled her relationship with character Marlon Dingle. However, as the character has developed, it was revealed that Rhona would give birth to a child born with Down syndrome. Henry stated she was really looking forward to this storyline, stating "over the years, I worked with adults and children with Down syndrome. It was great fun and I'm sure it will help with filming".

== Personal life ==
Henry married her Emmerdale co-star, Jeff Hordley, in 2003. They have two children.

== Awards and nominations ==
Year	Award	Category	Result	Ref.
1999	M.E.N. Theatre Awards	Best Newcomer	Won	
2013	Inside Soap Awards	Best Actress	Nominated	
2014	National Television Awards	Serial Drama Performance	Longlisted	
2016	British Soap Awards	Best Actress	Longlisted	
2016	Inside Soap Awards	Best Actress	Nominated	
2016	TV Choice Awards	Best Soap Actress	Nominated	
2017	British Soap Awards	Best Actress	Longlisted	
2017	Inside Soap Awards	Best Actress	Shortlisted	
2019	British Soap Awards	Best Actress	Longlisted	
2020	TV Choice Awards	Best Soap Actress	Nominated	
2022	Inside Soap Awards	Best Actress	Nominated	
2022	Inside Soap Awards	Best Romance (with Mark Charnock)	Won	
2024	National Television Awards	Serial Drama Performance	Longlisted	
