= Suzy Patterson =

British actress

Suzy Paterson is an actress best known for playing Susan Barlow in Coronation Street from 1979 to 1981.

== Early life ==
She was born in June 1961 and started acting lessons at the age of ten. Her first theatre appearance was as a Chinese girl in Aladdin with the Kirkintilloch Players.She then had several parts in BBC plays and appeared in a Max Boyce show.

She has a daughter, Sunny born in 2003.

== Coronation Street ==
When she joined Coronation Street she became the third actress to play Susan Barlow in the soap after Katie Heanue and Wendy Jane Walker. She appeared with a boyfriend on a cycling holiday and visited old uncle Albert. She returned as a bridesmaid at Ken's wedding to Deirdre. Previously appeared in the STV series The Prime of Miss Jean Brodie with Geraldine McEwan.
