= Susan Barlow =

Fictional character from Coronation Street

- Coronation Street character
- Joanna Foster as Susan Barlow (2001)
- Portrayed by: Katie Heanue (1965–1970); Wendy Jane Walker (1970–1974, 1985–1987); Suzy Paterson (1979–1981); Joanna Foster (2001)
- Duration: 1965–1971; 1973–1974; 1979–1981; 1985–1987; 2001
- First appearance: Episode 450; 5 April 1965
- Last appearance: Episode 4983; 11 February 2001
- Introduced by: H.V. Kershaw (1965); Eric Prytherch (1973, 1974); Bill Podmore (1979, 1981); John G. Temple (1985); Jane MacNaught (2001)
- Book appearances: Coronation Street: The Complete Saga
- Wendy Jane Walker as Susan Barlow (1986)

- Suzy Paterson as Susan Barlow (1981)
In-universe information
- Other names: Susan Baldwin
- Father: Ken Barlow
- Mother: Valerie Barlow
- Stepmother: Janet Barlow; Deirdre Barlow
- Brothers: Peter Barlow
- Half-brothers: Lawrence Cunningham; Daniel Osbourne
- Half-sisters: Tracy Barlow (adoptive)
- Husband: Mike Baldwin (1986–1988)
- Sons: Adam Barlow
- Grandfathers: Frank Barlow
- Grandmothers: Ida Barlow; Edith Tatlock
- Uncles: David Barlow
- Aunts: Joyce Tatlock
- Nephews: James Cunningham; Simon Barlow; Bertie Osbourne
- Nieces: Amy Barlow (adoptive)
- First cousins: Darren Barlow
- Other relatives: Nancy Leathers; Albert Tatlock; Ada Broadbent

Susan Barlow (also Baldwin) is a fictional character from the British ITV soap opera Coronation Street. She made her debut screen appearance on 5 April 1965. Susan has been portrayed by four actresses since her introduction. Katie Heanue was the first actress to play the character, appearing sporadically in the 1960s uncredited. Wendy Jane Walker took over the role for 26 episodes between 1970 and 1971, and between 1973 and 1974. When the character returned, Suzy Paterson was recast in the role.

She appeared in eight episodes from December 1979, until July 1981. Walker reprised the role on a permanent basis from October 1985 until November 1987. The fourth actress to play the role was Joanna Foster, who appeared in eight episodes in 2001 until the character was killed off. The character's final appearance was on 11 February 2001.

== Casting ==
From 1965 until 1970, Katie Heanue played Susan as a baby, and a young child. Afterwards, Katie Heanue and her family moved away from the Manchester area.

Child actress, Wendy Jane Walker, took over the role later in 1970. Although Susan was written out in 1971, Walker made recurring appearances in 1973 and 1974.

Suzy Patterson played Susan from 1979 to 1981, but only made a small number of appearances. Patterson played the role with a strong Scots accent, which was lost when Walker took the role back in 1985.

In 1985, and Susan became a main character again, before departing in 1987.

After a thirteen-year absence, Susan returned for a final time in early 2001, now played by Joanna Foster, where Susan got killed off after introducing her secret son Adam.

== Development ==
In January 2001, the character returned to Coronation Street with actress Joanna Foster taking over the role. Susan comes back to Weatherfield to introduce her son, Adam (Iain de Caestecker) to his grandfather, Ken (William Roache). Rick Fulton of the Daily Record said Ken is "amazed, but also devastated" that Susan kept his grandson a secret for so long. Adam's father is Mike Baldwin (Johnny Briggs), who Susan married in 1986. Susan told Mike she had an abortion and he threw her out the following year. Fulton explained "But that will be exposed as a lie. It seems Susan, who had grown to hate her husband, didn't think Mike would be a fit father for her child. She decided she wanted to bring up the baby on her own without any of his influence." The news rocks Ken and Mike, when they learn they are linked by Adam. On 22 January 2001, Brian Roberts of the Daily Mirror reported Susan would be killed off in a car accident. Her death would then kick-start a custody battle for her son, Adam, between her father and her ex-husband. Roberts said Susan is "adamant" that she does not want Mike having anything to do with Adam and she decides to take him to Ireland. However, while they are on their way Susan crashes the car and dies.

== Storylines ==
On the 5th April, 1965, Valerie Barlow (Anne Reid) is driven to the hospital by Ken (William Roache), in Len Fairclough (Peter Adamson)'s van, to give birth to their children: Susan and her twin Peter Barlow (Robert Heanue).

Valerie's life changes drastically with the birth of her children, and spends all her time looking after them and Ken. Her and Ken are able to find babysitters as they have many friends, which allows Valeries to attend her evening classes in Sociology.

In November 1965, Ken is looking after the twins, and decides to go out to the Rovers Return briefly for some cigarettes. During that time, a piece of coal fell from the fire and filled the house with smoke. Valerie comes home before Ken is able to put the fire out and is outraged that he had left the babies alone while he went to buy cigarettes. Valerie tells Ken she would leave him if he ever smoked again.

In 1966, Ken has a fling with reporter, Jackie Marsh. Valerie leaves him briefly and takes the twins to Glasgow, but returns when he convinces her that he would be a more devoted husband and father, from then on.

In 1968, the Mission of Glad Tidings and Elliston's Raincoat Factory across the Street are torn down to make way for a block of maisonettes. As they are being demolished, Ken and Valerie realise the twins are missing. They are found in the factory just before the wrecking ball hits.

In 1969, Susan's maternal grandmother, Edith, stays with the Barlows. When Edith takes the twins to the fair, she loses them, and they are found by an elderly woman who takes them in and doesn't contact the family.

In January 1971, Ken is offered a teaching position in Jamaica, and Valerie agrees to emigrate with the twins. However, Valerie dies when she is electrocuted by a faulty hairdryer.

Later in the year, Peter and Susan are sent to live in Scotland with their maternal grandparents, after Ken struggles to make suitable childcare arrangements, and continues to work as a teacher. Susan comes back to Weatherfield to visit her father in 1973, and 1974. Susan returns to Coronation Street again for New Year's Eve, 1979, and stays with her father and his girlfriend Deirdre Langton (Anne Kirkbride), into the New Year. Susan then goes travelling and visits Ken again in April 1980, along with her boyfriend Craig Brennan, who Ken does not approve of. Susan visits again, for Ken and Deirdre's wedding in July 1981. Susan goes back to Scotland and attends university.

In 1985, Susan returns again now working as a market researcher. She begins an affair with her father's sworn enemy Mike Baldwin (Johnny Briggs), and they get engaged, but Ken refuses to attend as he hates Mike, and cannot come to terms with the fact Mike is marrying his daughter. After a lot of thinking and talking to Susan, Peter and Deirdre, Ken decides to walk Susan down the aisle, on 6 May 1986. The marriage fails, because Susan's career ambitions do not fit in with Mike's plans for the future. When she gets pregnant, Mike wants her to abandon her business; Susan decides to have an abortion. Mike brands her a killer and a murdering bitch, and she leaves him, and moves to Newcastle, after just a year of marriage in November 1987.

By December 2000, Peter is living with Ken and Deirdre. While arguing with Ken, Peter let slip that Susan has a son. Susan has only told Peter about this. Peter then explains to Ken that Susan lied about having an abortion, and gave birth to a son, Adam (Iain De Caestecker), in May 1988.

Ken goes to Scotland the following month to visit Susan, and she makes him swear not to tell Mike. Ken tells Deirdre and she tells Dev Alahan (Jimmi Harkishin). He tells Mike, who calls Susan and demands access. Susan, who is visiting her father and brother, refuses. Mike threatens her with legal action. Susan tries to flee again with Adam to Ireland, but while driving on the M6, her car crashes into a tree. Susan is killed instantly but Adam suffers only minor injuries. Susan's body is taken back to Weatherfield for her funeral, and she is buried next to her mother, Valerie. Peter, Adam, Ken and his other son Daniel Osbourne (Rob Mallard), occasionally talk about Susan since she died.

== Reception ==
Johnny Briggs disapproved of the storyline that saw his character (Mike Baldwin) marry Susan as he thought it would tie his character down. He also did not get on with Walker and was pleased when the relationship broke up. The Daily Mirror's Charlie Catchpole described Susan as the "hapless" wife and daughter of Mike and Ken. He commented on her 2001 recast saying "I don't know why either of them believed a word she said, since Susan had been blonde and blue-eyed, and this impostor had black hair and brown eyes." Catchpole added that Susan's off screen death was one of the soap world's cruelest exits. Kerry Barrett from Entertainment Daily wrote that Susan's life was "full of drama" and called the character a "tragic mum".

In 2017, a storyline revisited the character when it was revealed that Billy Mayhew (Daniel Brocklebank) was involved in her death in his "dark past". Laura Donaldson from OK! noted that viewers watched the revelation "in shock".
