= Julia Haworth =

English actress

- Born: Burnley, Lancashire, England
- Occupation: Actress
- Years active: 1990–present
- Known for: Coronation Street (2003–2011)
- Spouse: Jon Wormald (m. 2006)
- Children: 2

Julia Haworth is an English actress. She is known for playing the role of Claire Peacock in the ITV soap opera Coronation Street from 2003 to 2011.

== Early and personal life ==
Haworth was born in Burnley, Lancashire. She attended St Christopher's Church of England High School, Accrington and later went to Nelson and Colne College and Manchester University. When she was nine, her mother enrolled her in drama workshops at Burnley Mechanics, and she subsequently joined Burnley Youth Theatre, combining acting roles with her studies.

In 2006, she married her partner Jon Wormald at St Stephen's Church, Burnley. Haworth gave birth to a daughter in July 2008. Her second daughter, Amelie Grace was born on 11 February 2013.

Haworth is a patron of UK–based Epidermolysis bullosa charity DEBRA.

== Career ==
After university, Haworth appeared in series such as Peak Practice and in Merseybeat. She first appeared on Coronation Street on 9 April 2003. It was the fourth role she had auditioned for on the series, and her previous experience with childcare was working on the Mother & Baby counter at Boots. Her last appearance was on 14 January 2011, when her character left Weatherfield widowed to start a new life in France with her son and stepson. From 2018 to 2019, Haworth appeared in the BBC soap opera Doctors in the recurring role of Laura Wade. In 2021, she appeared in the second series of the ITV drama The Bay and in an episode of the BBC series "Call The Midwife".

== Filmography ==
Year	Title	Role	Notes
1993–1994	Three Seven Eleven	Miranda Pudsey	Main role; 19 episodes
1994	Heartbeat	Joanna Parker	Episode: "Trouble in Mind"
1995	Medics	Rebecca Whittaker	Episode: "Lifeline"
1997	My Dad's a Boring Nerd	Sophie	Television film
1998	The Grand	Lark Rothery	Main role; 10 episodes
1999	See How They Run	Christine	2 episodes
1999	The Ambassador	Zoe	Episode: "A Matter of Life and Death"
1999	Where the Heart Is	Helen Trent	Episode: "New Moon Arising"
2000	Monarch of the Glen	Janice	Series 1: Episode 5
2000	Life Force	Karen Webber	Main role; 13 episodes
2000–2001	Peak Practice	Julie Pullen	Main role; 29 episodes
2001–2002	Merseybeat	Jenny Oulton	Main role; 11 episodes
2003–2011	Coronation Street	Claire Peacock	Series regular; 669 episodes
2012	Preston Passion	Bella's Mother	Televised live performance
2012	Monroe	Julie Herd	Series 2: Episode 1
2015	Doctors	Susie Gregory	Episode: "Afternoon Delight"
2017	The Dumping Ground	Katherine	Episode: "Faking It"
2018	The Royals	Minnie	1 episode
2019	Annual Review	Amanda	Short film
2018–2019	Doctors	Laura Wade	Recurring role
2020	Once a Year on Blackpool Sands	Sandra Green	Film
2020	Know Your Reptile	Cecilia the Bearded Dragon	Television special
2021	The Bay	Becky Thrower	2 episodes
2021	Call the Midwife	Doris Owen	1 episode
2023	A Kind of Spark	Pamela Parks	Recurring role
