= Wendy Jane Walker =

English actress (born 1964)

Wendy Jane Walker (born 1964, Manchester, Lancashire) is an English actress who became well known during the 1980s for playing Susan Barlow in the ITV soap opera, Coronation Street.

She originally played the part as a child from 1970 to 1974, and after another actress portrayed the character in intervening years, she returned in 1985 as a regular character. Walker stayed in the role until late 1987.

Other acting roles included The Adventures of Sherlock Holmes, Brass and six episodes of How We Used to Live in 1984. By 1990, Walker had retired from acting and was working as a tour guide.

In 2019, Walker stated that she lives a "happy, quiet" life in Devon, UK and that she has at least one daughter.
