= Samia Longchambon =

English television actress

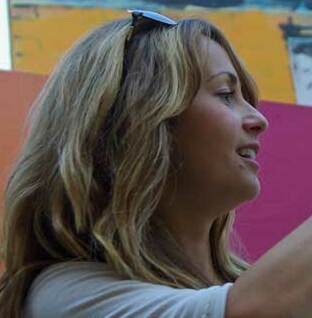
- Longchambon in 2011
- Born: Samia Maxine Ghadie; 13 July 1982 (age 44); Eccles, Greater Manchester, England
- Occupation: Actress
- Years active: 1992–present
- Known for: Bob’s weekend (1996); There's Only One Jimmy Grimble (2000); Adam's Family Tree (1997-1998); Coronation Street (1992, 2000–present); Children's Ward (1995); Heartbeat (1997, 2000); Dancing on Ice (2013); Big Star's Little Star (2018); Cooking with the Stars (2023)
- Spouses: Matt Smith (m. 2005; div. 2011) Sylvain Longchambon (m. 2016)
- Children: 2

Samia Maxine Longchambon (née Ghadie, previously Smith; born 13 July 1982) is an English actress. She has played the role of Maria Connor in the ITV soap opera Coronation Street since 2000. She also appeared as a contestant on the eighth series of Dancing on Ice in 2013, and won the third series of Cooking with the Stars in 2023.

== Early life ==
Samia Ghadie was born in Eccles, Greater Manchester to Joseph, a French-Lebanese shop owner and Patsy, an English actress whom he met whilst working in Abu Dhabi. Samia lived there for a period as a child. She has an older brother named Tariq.

== Career ==
Longchambon first appeared as an extra in Coronation Street at the age of eight and 10 years later she became a regular on the show. She made her first credited TV appearance when she was 11 years old, appearing in an episode of Cracker ("The Big Crunch"). She also made appearances in Children's Ward, Heartbeat, Doctors, There's Only One Jimmy Grimble (feature film) and the children's series Life Force.

In 2000, she beat both Suzanne Shaw and Kimberley Walsh to get the role of Maria Sutherland in the ITV soap opera Coronation Street. In Autumn 2009, she took a short break from her role as Maria in Coronation Street on maternity leave and resumed her role in the show in May 2010. She won an episode of Celebrity Stars in Their Eyes impersonating Holly Valance. She also made an appearance in Bo' Selecta! in 2004 as part of a Coronation Street sketch along with co-star Suranne Jones.

In January 2013, Longchambon was a competitor in the eighth series of Dancing on Ice, partnered with French professional ice skater Sylvain Longchambon. However, she was concussed a few days into the pre-series training and eliminated in week eight of the competition, losing out in a skate-off to Luke Campbell.

In 2023, Longchambon won the third series of Cooking with the Stars.

== Personal life ==
She married Matt Smith, a property developer, at St Philip's Church in Alderley Edge, Cheshire on 10 September 2005 after a seven-month engagement. On 19 October 2009, she gave birth to a baby girl, following which she left Coronation Street temporarily on maternity leave. On 4 January 2011, she and her husband announced that they had separated by mutual agreement. On 4 November 2011, she revealed that she had reverted to her maiden surname of Ghadie following a decree absolute which had been granted the same day. In May 2015, she announced her engagement to French professional ice skater Sylvain Longchambon. They married in August 2016. Their son was born on 24 September 2015.

Longchambon's father Joseph died of cancer on 14 April 2009.

== Filmography ==
=== Film ===
Year	Film	Role	Notes
1996	Bob's Weekend	Kimberley's friend	
2000	There's Only One Jimmy Grimble	Sara	

=== Television ===
Year	Title	Role	Notes
1992	Coronation Street	Extra	Episode: 3482
1994	Cracker	Rosie	Episode: "The Big Crunch: Part 1"
1995	Children's Ward	Charlotte	2 episodes
1997–1998	Adam's Family Tree	Jane	Main role; 13 episodes
1997, 2000	Heartbeat	Maddy; Sian Horrocks	2 episodes
1999	The Cops	Emma Hayes	Series 2: Episode 9
2000	Life Force	Marianne	Episode: "Age Before Beauty"
2000	Doctors	Kelly Morris	Episode: "Game Over"
2000–present	Coronation Street	Maria Connor	Series regular
2003	TV Burp	Maria Connor	Series 2: Episode 1
2003	Children in Need	Maria Connor	1 episode
2010	Bookaboo	Unnamed	Episode: "A Visitor for Bear"
2013	Dancing on Ice	Herself	Contestant (5th place)
2018	Big Star's Little Star	Herself	Participant
2023	Cooking with the Stars	Herself	Contestant; winner
2026	Loose Women	Herself	Guest Panellist (3 episodes)

=== Guest appearances ===
Samia has appeared twice on the ITV game show, All Star Family Fortunes. Her first appearance was in a Christmas special in December 2006, when she appeared as part of the Battersby-Brown family. Her second appearance was in May 2012, when she appeared with her own family. In 2008, by then known as Samia Smith, she appeared as a guest on Keith Lemon's Very Brilliant World Tour when the show visited Egypt. On 20 September 2014, Samia appeared as a contestant on the primetime game show, The Chase: Celebrity Special.

== Awards and nominations ==
Year	Award	Category	Result	Ref.
2002	British Soap Awards	Sexiest Female	Nominated	
2003	British Soap Awards	Sexiest Female	Nominated	
2004	British Soap Awards	Sexiest Female	Nominated	
2005	British Soap Awards	Sexiest Female	Nominated	
2005	Inside Soap Awards	Sexiest Female	Won	
2006	British Soap Awards	Sexiest Female	Nominated	
2006	Inside Soap Awards	Sexiest Female	Nominated	
2006	Inside Soap Awards	Best Dressed Soap Star	Won	
2007	British Soap Awards	Sexiest Female	Nominated	
2007	Inside Soap Awards	Sexiest Female	Nominated	
2008	British Soap Awards	Sexiest Female	Nominated	
2008	Inside Soap Awards	Best Actress	Nominated	
2009	British Soap Awards	Best Actress	Nominated	
2013	All About Soap Awards	Forbidden Lovers (shared with Charlie Condou)	Nominated	
2014	Inside Soap Awards	Best Bitch	Nominated	
2014	Inside Soap Awards	Sexiest Female	Nominated	
2017	Inside Soap Awards	Best Bad Girl	Nominated	
