= Simon Barlow =

Fictional character from Coronation Street

- Coronation Street character
- Alex Bain as Simon Barlow (2021)
- Portrayed by: Daniel Whelan (2003); Jake and Oscar Hartley (2003); Alex Bain (2008–2024)
- Duration: 2003, 2008–2024
- First appearance: Episode 5538; 6 July 2003
- Last appearance: Episode 11281; 3 June 2024
- Introduced by: Kieran Roberts (2003); Kim Crowther (2008)
In-universe information
- Occupation: Courier; Drug dealer
- Father: Peter Barlow
- Mother: Lucy Richards
- Adoptive mother: Leanne Battersby
- Stepfather: Nick Tilsley (adoptive)
- Stepmother: Carla Connor
- Half-brothers: Oliver Battersby (adoptive)
- Grandfathers: Ken Barlow; George Wilson; Les Battersby (adoptive)
- Grandmothers: Valerie Barlow; Stella Price (adoptive)
- Uncles: Lawrence Cunningham; Daniel Osbourne; Greg Kelly (adoptive)
- Aunts: Susan Barlow; Tracy Barlow (adoptive); Eva Price (adoptive); Toyah Battersby (adoptive)
- First cousins: James Cunningham; Adam Barlow; Bertie Osbourne; Amy Barlow (adoptive); Susie Price (adoptive)

Simon Barlow (also Richards) is a fictional character from the British ITV soap opera Coronation Street and was played by Alex Bain between 2008 and 2024. The character was originally played by twins, Jake and Oscar Hartley, on his birth in 2003. Simon is the son of Peter Barlow (Chris Gascoyne) and Lucy Richards (Katy Carmichael), the adoptive son of Leanne Battersby (Jane Danson) and the grandson of Ken Barlow (William Roache) and Deirdre Barlow (Anne Kirkbride). His storylines have included his mother's death, a custody battle between Peter and his maternal grandfather, a custody battle between Peter and Leanne, physically abusing Leanne, and dealing drugs. In December 2023, it was announced that Bain would be leaving the show after 16 years and the character departed on 3 June 2024.

== Development ==
=== Reintroduction ===
The character of Simon was re-introduced in late 2008 when his on-screen father Peter (Chris Gascoyne) also returned to the soap. Peter had been given custody of his son after his mother Lucy Richards (Katy Carmichael) was diagnosed with terminal cancer. Both characters' returns saw them slowly develop a father-son relationship.

=== Domestic violence towards Leanne Battersby ===
In March 2015, it was announced that the character of Simon would be involved in a domestic abuse, with it being where Simon is the perpetrator and his mother Leanne would be the victim. Executive producer Kieran Roberts said "It's a really interesting story. It's come from character, as Simon is a child who has obviously been through a very difficult few years with the death of his mother, his dad’s alcoholism and then being passed around by the adults in his life. He's seen a lot of difficult things and he's got some more difficult things to go through this year in the next few months. I can't give much away, but there is at least one other major trauma that Simon is going to have to go through. I think it's fair to say that he’s going to come through all of this a little bit damaged. We’re going to explore how that impacts on his relationship with Leanne, and we're going to touch on this issue of domestic violence from a child against a parent."

Jane Danson, who plays Leanne Battersby, said of the storyline in September 2015 that she had doubts when she heard about the domestic abuse plot "It's quite interesting. When they proposed this storyline, I was a bit concerned because I thought historically, as we've seen, Leanne's quite a strong character. I thought, 'She wouldn't take that from a child!' But the way it's been done is quite clever. He's a child who's been through so much with his dad, with the alcoholism, and he's lost so many people in his life. She's been the one constant, so she'll never give up on him. It's been really great to play out, because they've pretty much done it in real time. It's not just been two weeks of a storyline, they've played it out and we continue to play it out with what we're filming at the moment. It's been quite interesting to see a different side of Leanne as well."

In November 2015, it was announced that Simon would lash out at Amy at Christmas as part of the domestic abuse plot. A source said that "The Barlows are going to be central to Coronation Street in the run up to Christmas. The close-knit family will be put under extreme strain and viewers will be left wondering if they can get through the turmoil."

=== Departure (2024) ===
On 27 December 2023 it was announced that Bain would be written out after 16 years and is set for an ‘explosive’ exit in the summer.

== Storylines ==
Simon is born in July 2003 to Lucy Richards (Katy Carmichael), who had already split up with Simon's father Peter Barlow (Chris Gascoyne). On learning that Peter has married his girlfriend, Shelley Unwin (Sally Lindsay), though he is already married, Lucy tells Shelley that her marriage is illegal. Lucy tricks Peter into thinking they have a future together by moving Spain for a fresh start, then, in front of pub regulars, announcing she and Simon are emigrating to Australia to get away from Peter. Peter races to the airport and catches up with them to try to stop Lucy from boarding the plane, however Peter’s father, Ken Barlow (William Roache) stops him from trying to take Simon, knowing that Lucy will tell the police about his bigamy. Peter resigns himself to never knowing Simon, and leaves Weatherfield soon after.

Peter is awarded custody of Simon when Lucy dies from ovarian cancer in October 2008 and they move in with Ken, his wife Deirdre Barlow (Anne Kirkbride) and her mother Blanche Hunt (Maggie Jones). Peter, at first reluctant to take an active role in raising Simon, changes his mind when he finds out that Lucy has left her estate to him on the condition that he raises Simon. Peter buys the local bookmaker's shop and moves in there with Simon. Peter's drinking problem becomes evident when he comes to Simon's Nativity play drunk and has a row with teaching staff in December 2008. Simon stays with Ken, Deirdre and Blanche until Peter agrees to stop drinking, but in March 2009, Peter passes out with a lit cigarette in his hand, and the flat catches fire. Luke Strong (Craig Kelly) and Tony Gordon (Gray O'Brien) break the door down after Deirdre alerts them, having received a telephone call from Simon before he passed out due to smoke inhalation. Peter and Simon are rushed to hospital and make a full recovery. Peter vows once more to give up alcohol.

Learning that he has a grandson, Peter is surprised to meet Lucy's father, George Wilson (Anthony Valentine) in November 2009. He had separated from Lucy's mother when she was very young and their relationship had suffered. George is determined not to make the same mistake with Simon, and Peter's girlfriend Leanne Battersby (Jane Danson) persuades Peter to allow George and his partner, Eve, access. George also invests in the bar that Peter and Leanne intend to open but Ken's worst fears come true when Peter falls off the wagon again and George wins interim custody of Simon in February 2010. In March 2010, while on holiday in Blackpool, Simon runs away after hearing George telling Eve that he intends to take Simon down to Kent to live and he makes his way home alone, scaring everyone in the process. While Peter and Leanne are proud that Simon travelled all that way alone, they make sure he knows that was very wrong. Simon is devastated when Blanche dies in May 2010. In August 2010, Simon has a fight with Aadi Alahan (Zennon Ditchett) while playing a game, and Aadi hits his head on a table, falls unconscious, and is rushed to hospital. Simon does not tell anyone and feels guilty over the incident, while Aadi's parents Dev (Jimmi Harkishin) and Sunita Alahan (Shobna Gulati) accuse Claire Peacock (Julia Haworth) of negligence. Simon reveals the truth about Aadi's injury after Peter questions him about his erratic behaviour. Peter tells Dev and Sunita the facts, clearing Claire's name.

In December 2010, Peter is in the Joinery bar when it explodes, causing part of the viaduct to collapse, and a tram comes off the viaduct, crashing into the Corner Shop and The Kabin. The results of the destruction bring down a power line (plunging the street into darkness in the process), destroy the post box, and set No.13 on fire. Simon is found at home and rescued by Jason Grimshaw (Ryan Thomas). He is devastated to find Peter on his death-bed, but relieved when Peter pulls through; his severe injuries leave Peter temporarily unable to walk. Simon is thrilled when Peter and Leanne renew their vows in February 2011. In June 2011, Simon meets Stella Price (Michelle Collins), her boyfriend Karl Munro (John Michie) and her daughter Eva Price (Catherine Tyldesley). Stella is revealed to be Leanne's biological mother at Leanne's 30th birthday in July 2011. Simon is impressed and Stella later gets him a Nintendo DS game for his birthday. He also finds out that Leanne is pregnant with Peter’s baby but she miscarries after a fall from the stairs.

Just before Christmas 2011, Peter begins a clandestine affair with Carla Connor (Alison King), and Simon is devastated when Leanne, learning the truth, leaves the Street in February 2012. Simon gives Carla a frosty reception when she moves in, insisting that he wants Leanne back and spends as much time as he can at Ken and Deirdre's house. Peter, however, does everything he can to make Simon spend more time with Carla, in the hope that Simon will warm to her. However, in July 2012, Peter allows Simon to go and live with Leanne, and Peter and Carla leave the country as Peter takes an opportunity to sail a yacht from Southampton down to Lanzarote in the Canary Islands.

Simon lives with Leanne and her boyfriend Nick Tilsley (Ben Price) until Peter and Carla return unexpectedly in December 2012, just as they are about to leave for Las Vegas, where Leanne and Nick plan to get married, but Simon now refuses to leave, as he wants to see Peter, so they stay. Carla is unhappy as they had only planned to stay in Weatherfield for a couple of days but Peter can't bring himself to leave Simon again so Carla returns to Los Angeles alone.

Leanne and Nick reschedule their marriage for Christmas Day 2012 but after what Peter says on her hen night, Leanne visits Peter and suggests they get back together, but Carla has returned and is having none of it! She runs back to the car and plans to marry Nick but before she can say "I do", Eva proclaims what Leanne had done that morning and Nick refuses to go through with the wedding. Simon is devastated and blames Carla. In August 2013, Simon is upset when Peter and Carla tell him that Nick is in hospital, after a car accident that leaves him in a coma with brain injuries. They take him to visit Nick. Simon is concerned when Nick has mood swings from his brain injury. After Nick is discharged from hospital, he gets confused and picks Simon up from school early, without anyone knowing, and shouts at him whilst helping him with his homework. Leanne sends Simon to stay with Peter until Nick recovers. Simon befriends Faye Windass (Ellie Leach) and Grace Piper (Ella-Grace Gregoire), and they get him to shoplift at Dev’s shop. He is caught stealing some supplies by Dev and Mary Taylor (Patti Clare) and is taken home by Leanne.

In November 2013, Simon falls victim to a happy slapping attack orchestrated by Faye and Grace. He is beaten and forced to wear a dress and lipstick. He is later delighted when Peter and Carla hire Tina McIntyre (Michelle Keegan) as his nanny. Simon confides in Tina about the happy slapping attack, which later leads to Faye and Grace being questioned by the police. Unknown to Carla or Simon, Peter begins an affair with Tina, which is not revealed until May 2014.

In June 2014, Carla's brother, Rob Donovan (Marc Baylis), confronts Tina and attacks her in her own home, leading to an argument on the balcony of her flat. After a scuffle, Rob pushes Tina away, causing her to lose her balance and plummet onto the cobbles below. Tina survives the fall, but Rob later beats her with a metal pipe, when she threatens to tell the police that he tried to kill her. Tina later dies in hospital, devastating Simon, who believes that Peter has murdered her. Peter's relationship with Simon thaws a little and he promises him that he did not kill Tina. However, in July 2014, Simon is even more devastated when Peter is arrested and charged on suspicion of killing Tina. When Ken returns from Canada in August 2014, he persuades Simon to go and visit Peter in prison. He agrees at first, but Rob, wanting Peter to plead guilty, asks Simon if he would like to go to Chester Zoo with him, his fiancée and Ken's daughter Tracy Barlow (Kate Ford) and her daughter Amy (Elle Mulvaney).

Leanne eventually takes Simon to visit Peter, but he does not want anything to do with him, after discovering that he has been drinking. Simon is devastated when Peter ends up in hospital and eventually believes that he did not kill Tina. Maddie Heath (Amy James-Kelly) begins to babysit Simon and he also shares a bond with Deirdre's dog, Eccles. Amy starts bullying Simon over his attention to Eccles. In September 2014, when Amy thinks that Eccles loves Simon more than she loves her, she tells Tracy that Eccles bit her. Tracy tells Deirdre that Eccles must be put down but Amy is later forced to tell the truth, horrifying Simon. When Rob and Tracy go on a week's holiday in Swansea, Amy's father, Steve McDonald (Simon Gregson), asks Ken to babysit Amy for the night, the same night that Deirdre had agreed to babysit Simon. When they arrive together, they immediately clash and when Simon unfolds the sofa into a bed, Amy sits on him. Deirdre, unable to cope with Amy's behaviour, sends her back to the Rovers, much to Simon's delight. In October 2014, Rob takes Simon to visit Tina’s grave and Simon is upset, believing that Peter killed Tina. Rob reveals to Simon that he didn’t kill Tina. When Peter is released from prison, he reunites with Simon. He later reveals that he is leaving to live in Portsmouth and makes peace with Simon before leaving in November 2014.

After the explosion at Victoria Court in May 2015, Simon is unaware that Leanne's partner, Kal Nazir (Jimi Mistry), has died after saving Amy from the fire. He learns Kal has died from Kal's mother, Yasmeen Nazir (Shelley King) and Simon is devastated. In June 2015, when Leanne asks Simon to do a simple job while sorting out Kal's belongings with Kal's children, Alya (Sair Khan) and Zeedan (Qasim Akhtar), Simon refuses. Simon later storms out of the flat and when he returns, Leanne is annoyed that Simon has eaten and she asks him to wash up. When Leanne tries to talk to Simon about how she knows he has lost Lucy, Simon angrily points out she died and he throws a remote at Leanne. Leanne takes Simon to the Barlows house and when asked about the bruise, Leanne lies that it was caused by a cupboard door. Later, Simon apologises to Leanne and she apologises to him for what he's been through, but she warns him he can't do what he did again, no matter how angry he gets. The next day, Leanne and Simon go to France to visit Leanne's grandmother Gloria Price (Sue Johnston) to forget about recent events. In July 2015, Simon is later given a shattering blow when he discovers that Deirdre has died on the day of her birthday and homecoming party. Along with Leanne and Steve’s mother Liz McDonald (Beverly Callard), he is held hostage by Liz’s boyfriend Dan Jones, and discovers Leanne’s past prostitution from Dan. He becomes angry and when Leanne tries to talk to him about it, and hits her broken wrist.

Simon's behaviour and attitude towards Leanne worsens. He kicks her leg and it causes a severe bleed in August 2015. Later, he shouts in Leanne's face, pushing her and thus beginning to scare her more. After Simon plays a game of football, Leanne says he and some of his friends can come to the Bistro for dinner. Simon's friend Kyle peer pressures him into stealing a bottle of vodka, from which Simon and his friends get drunk. Leanne takes Simon home and tries discussing issues, but he walks out. Another row leads to a physical altercation on both sides, Leanne pushes Simon away in self-defence, unfortunately, he cuts his arm as he falls to the ground. In September 2015, when Leanne and Simon argue again, Simon pushes Leanne against a table and she is later found unconscious by Dev and Mary and is taken to hospital, with Zeedan accompanying her. During this, Simon stays at Ken’s and is hidden by Amy. Leanne finally admits to Zeedan what Simon has been doing and Leanne decides to send Simon to stay with Peter in Portsmouth. When Simon returns in November 2015, his behaviour hasn't improved and he tells Eva about his time in Portsmouth and that Peter was too busy with his girlfriend. Eva informs Leanne and when Leanne tries to talk to Simon further about it, Simon storms out. Simon skips school and when Leanne returns home, she finds Simon in the flat with some friends causing chaos. Simon ignores Leanne and walks out and when he comes home, he locks himself in his bedroom. Leanne finally admits to Eva that Simon has been physically abusing her and she doesn't know how much more she can take. When graffiti is sprayed outside the Bistro, Leanne believes Simon is responsible and she later finds a can of red spray paint in his bag. When Leanne confronts Simon, he makes cruel remarks about her infertility and Leanne almost hits him. Leanne arranges for Simon to live with Ken and when Leanne drops Simon at Ken's, Simon tells Leanne that if she walks away, he will never speak to her again, but Leanne leaves him.

When Amy annoys Simon with her violin, he tries to take it from her. However, Ken catches them arguing and they come up with a solution. Simon ignores a text from Leanne, which makes Leanne believe she has lost Simon. Simon arrives home from school early and Robert Preston (Tristan Gemmill) talks to Simon in an attempt to understand how he is feeling. When Simon spots Leanne with Eva looking relaxed, he soon gets angry again. Simon and Amy are left alone at Ken's house and Simon ends up hurting Amy. Amy tells Ken and Tracy, who contact Leanne. Leanne is encouraged by Eva to admit Simon has been hurting her. Leanne has to take Simon home and the family agree to get Simon help.

Leanne arranges for both her and Simon to see a counsellor, with Robert’s support. In February 2016, Leanne encourages Simon to do football trials and Simon is successful getting onto the team. On the day of his football match, Simon insists that Leanne doesn't come. However, she does and brings Ken and Zeedan. At the match, Leanne meets Tom (Daniel Casey) again and Simon receives taunts from a teammate. Simon hurts Kyle and Leanne is horrified when Simon tells Zeedan he believes Kyle deserved it. After talking to both Ken and Zeedan about her fears, Leanne decides to report Simon to the police. Despite Simon claiming it was an accident, Leanne goes to the police and she is forced to reveal that Simon abused her. The following day, the police visit Simon and Simon is taken to the station with Ken. In the interview, Simon loses his temper and he is later released on bail pending an investigation. Simon refuses to go home with Leanne and decides to stay with Ken. Later, Leanne gets a visit from Tom, who shows them footage of the incident and Leanne realises Simon was telling the truth. Leanne apologises to Simon, but he refuses to forgive her and Simon contacts his dad. Leanne gives Simon the choice of staying with Peter during the half term and he decides to go. Despite saying he might not come back, he returns two weeks later.

In July 2016, after noticing Leanne has been feeling unwell, Simon confides in Amy about his fears that Leanne has cancer. Amy tries to reassure him, but he finds a message on Leanne's phone confirming a doctor's appointment. Simon goes to the medical centre and wants Leanne to tell him what is wrong. At home, Leanne tells him she is pregnant. Leanne avoids telling Simon about the baby's father and he buys a baby grow. Leanne reassures Simon that he is her first child and she won't love him any less. In August 2016, Leanne decides to move to Liverpool with Simon. Simon takes a set of tickets, forcing Leanne to buy more and he secretly phones Nick and Leanne admits she loves him. Nick arrives at the coach station, knowing about the baby and persuades Leanne to stay. Simon is thrilled when Leanne and Nick decide to move in together and when Nick says he is the father of Leanne's baby. In October 2016, Simon is upset when Peter fails to come and watch Simon collect an award, but is pleased when he returns. Simon finds out from Tracy that Peter caused Ken to collapse from a stroke after an argument. While visiting Ken in hospital, he is angry when Peter joins and Ken loses his temper at Simon. After talking with Simon, Peter makes up with him. In December 2016, Simon witnesses Peter kissing Leanne’s stepsister, Toyah Battersby (Georgia Taylor), with his new drone. When he is about to tell Leanne about the affair, Simon finds out that Leanne is hospital, due to a migraine from Peter and Toyah. In January 2017, Peter leaves cigarettes at Leanne's flat and Toyah attempts to take the blame, but Simon is forced to cover for her. Simon confides in Eva about Peter and Toyah's relationship. When Leanne finds out about Toyah and Peter, and that Eva knew, she disowns them and when they attempt to apologise, Simon warns them Leanne's blood pressure is too high. Peter allows Simon to go to a party, but his family struggle to get hold of him and he is returned home by the police after the group split and his phone died. In February 2017, Leanne gives birth to a son Oliver. She tells Simon that Steve is Oliver’s father, leaving him ashamed. He tells Steve about Leanne registering Oliver, leading Steve to see her in the registry office. In March 2017, when Ken is found unconscious at the bottom of the stairs, the police believe he was pushed and the family are made suspects. Simon's mobile phone is confiscated by his teacher, but Peter gets it back and smashes it. In April 2017, Simon buys a new one and he finds a voice message from Peter, explaining that he has done a bad thing and needs to leave. Leanne and Nick take the mobile phone to the police. In May 2017, Leanne decides to get Peter, Nick and Steve to make up caused by the revelation that Steve is Oliver’s father and they bring Simon to the beach after he missed out on a trip. Simon is annoyed when Peter and Nick argue. Nick leaves Weatherfield in June 2017 and sells the flat, so Simon moves in with Peter and Toyah whilst Leanne and Oliver move in with Steve.

In October 2017, Simon attempts to force Summer Spellman (Matilda Freeman), who has been placed into the care of Billy Mayhew (Daniel Brocklebank) and Todd Grimshaw (Bruno Langley), to smoke cigarettes that he found, but Summer takes them for herself and smokes them when she is emotional. Summer is found unconscious by Amy and Simon and is taken to hospital, where it turns out she smoked spice and Billy and Todd make amends. Peter and Toyah find out from the children that Simon had the cigarette. Billy is furious about what Simon did and when Peter blames Billy and Todd's arguments for Summer's actions, Billy beats Peter up. Simon overhears Billy and Peter talk about the attack and when social services are left satisfied with their visit to Summer, Billy and Todd, Simon tells them what Billy did. The social worker tells Billy and Todd that it will threaten the adoption. In January 2018, Simon tricks Leanne, Eva, and Toyah into giving him money for false reasons to buy headphones to block out the noise made by them all. Simon is expelled from school and placed in a pupil referral unit, which angers Peter and Leanne. Simon begins misbehaving and rebelling. In March 2018, he hangs around with a group of boys and they mug Audrey Roberts (Sue Nicholls), who is pushed to the floor by gang member Tyler Jefferies (Will Barnett) and is rushed to hospital. Roy Cropper (David Neilson), who saw the incident, tells Leanne and Peter that Simon was one of the attackers and Peter confronts Simon, who is worried that the police will be involved. He apologises to Audrey and Roy at the hospital. When Carla catches Simon with the gang and confronts them, she takes Simon to the Underworld factory. Simon is offered an IT job at Underworld. Leanne and Peter are pleased that Simon is behaving well and see him looking after Hope Stape (Isabella Flanagan) and Ruby Dobbs (Macy Alabi) after the couple, Ruby's father Tyrone Dobbs (Alan Halsall) and Hope's mother Fiz (Jennie McAlpine) row. That night, Simon hangs around with the gang again and force him to smash the car window, before he runs off with the gang.

In April 2018, Simon steals money from Toyah's purse and overhears a pregnant Eva and Toyah's deal about wanting Eva's baby. Peter and Leanne find out about Toyah's stolen money and accuse Simon. Simon tells Toyah that he knows about the deal and blackmails her. Simon again hangs around with Tyler and they skip school together. Simon hacks Tyler's phone and messages Summer that Tyler wants to date her. Simon picks on Summer in front of Tyler, who realises that Simon went on his phone to message Summer. Toyah tells Peter that Simon is blackmailing her and Peter confronts Simon. When Toyah is about to go to a cottage, where Eva is to have her baby, she finds her car missing, which Simon and Tyler joyride on. Simon finds out that Toyah has rented a cottage for Eva. Toyah lies to Peter and Leanne that Simon has been helping her so they would not find out that Tyler and Simon have been joyriding. When Eva gives birth to a daughter Susie is born, Toyah shows her to Peter and Simon, via video call. Peter announces in the Rovers that Susie is born, leaving Simon frustrated. When Toyah returns with Susie, Peter asks her to marry him, which Simon is not happy about. Simon tells Leanne that he thinks that Toyah is having an affair and that she has rented a cottage. Toyah denies this to Leanne. When everyone finds out about the suicide of Susie's father Aidan Connor (Shayne Ward), Peter tells Simon about opening up to people, which a tearful Eva overhears. In June 2018, Simon and the gang steal money from Roy’s cafe and they spend it on buying Simon a new jacket. Peter and Leanne take him to the police station, after discovering this. After not responding to the interview, he is discharged as there was no evidence because of this. The following day, Tyler and Simon get into a robbery in a flat and are caught by Flora McArdle, before Tyler throws an object at her, knocking her unconscious. He runs off whilst Simon stays with Flora. She reveals to the police about the incident, leading Simon to get arrested. At the police station, with Peter’s support, he reveals that Tyler got him into the two robberies. Tyler is charged and loses his temper at Simon, pinning him against the wall and scraping his hand on it. In July 2018, as punishment, Simon is offered a job at Roy’s cafe. He and Tyler apologise to each other for recent events. After Tyler poisons Eccles, Simon leaves with Ken to stay in Cornwall, as Toyah offered.

When he returns in August 2018, he receives negative text messages from Tyler, who stalks him. Simon is almost kidnapped by two of Tyler’s friends, but is saved by Carla’s half-sister Kate Connor (Faye Brookes). Tyler is later reported to the police. Peter takes Simon to Underworld to protect him, and he stays with Carla. When a pregnant Sinead Tinker (Katie McGlynn) becomes ill, Carla takes her to her husband and Ken’s son Daniel Osbourne (Rob Mallard), leaving Simon unattended. Tyler and his friends witness this and try to take Simon. Peter and Carla rush to save Simon whilst Tyler shoots Peter with a paint gun. Leanne is furious about Carla leaving Simon and warns Carla as Simon has refused to go to court for the incident from Tyler. Simon changes his mind about going to court. Following the court verdict, Tyler is sent to Youth Offenders.

In October 2018, Leanne is rushed to hospital after being struck by a car and is left in critical condition, sustaining major injuries. Nick returns and when Leanne recovers and is discharged, she finds out that Simon encouraged Nick to stay in Weatherfield as he had told him that Leanne still loves him. Nick and Leanne later get back together. After a meeting with school about careers, Simon decides to join the Navy, leaving Leanne furious and concerned. She doesn’t allow him to join up before he meets up with Gary Windass, who Nick and Leanne encourage him to talk to Simon. The following day, he is annoyed with Leanne before Nick talks to him about it. Carla orders Peter a boat as a surprise, and Peter decides to plan a holiday with Simon to travel on the boat.

In January 2019, Simon later discovers that Tyler has impregnated Amy. Steve and Tracy initially believe that Simon is the culprit upon finding a series of text messages where Simon appears overly concerned for Amy's well-being. Steve also sees Simon supporting Amy by hugging her. Tyler threatens Simon into pretending to be the baby’s father by pinning him against the wall and telling him he is too afraid of getting hurt by him. The following day, Simon makes Amy to go after Tyler after he tells her of what Tyler said to him, before Steve and Tracy find out that Tyler is the baby’s father.

In February 2019, Simon becomes involved in a boat fire. He is saved by Peter and is rushed to hospital, due to smoke inhalation.

In July 2020, following Oliver’s diagnosis of a mitochondrial disease, Simon overhears Steve and Leanne talking and Leanne stating that she will have nothing if Oliver dies, making Simon believe that Leanne doesn’t want him. He skips his exams before Leanne confronts him. He confides in Peter about what he heard and decides to stay with him in the Rovers, devastating Leanne. She encourages Simon to come home for hers and Oliver’s sake and also apologises to him.

In February 2021, Simon starts working at For Your Fries Only. His colleague Jacob Hay (Jack James Ryan) grooms him into drug dealing by allowing him to believe that he owed him £2000 after he staged a robbery. This leads to him doing dodgy jobs for him, including threatening to set a guy, who had apparently stole from them, on fire. It is witnessed by Sam Blakeman (Jude Riordan) which leads to his father Nick confronting Simon and telling him that he no longer wants him around Sam. Afterwards, Leanne discovers all of this and when Simon’s new boss Harvey Gaskell (Will Mellor) starts to threaten him, she takes over. Eventually, she has enough of it and reports him to the police. When she confesses this to him, he leads her to a vehicle where he was planning to kill her. However, armed police arrive on the scene and take Harvey into custody. After Leanne makes a police statement against Harvey, she decides to go into hiding out of fear, taking Simon and Nick with her.

On 30 April, Peter is called into hospital to receive a donor liver. He tries to make contact with Simon by calling him, meanwhile Sharon Bentley (Tracie Bennett) arrives back to the street, and it is revealed that she is Harvey’s aunt, Sharon. She begins befriending Sam, and after informing Sam that Simon’s father is receiving a transplant, she convinces him to phone Nick to inform him of the news. Simon overhears Nick informing Leanne of Peter's surgery, and he runs off to see his dad. Whilst visiting Peter in the hospital, the doctor reveals the liver is unviable. A man is then seen informing someone over the phone of Simon’s location, and when the pair are leaving, Peter overhears the man mention Simon’s surname and tells him to run. Peter is attacked while Simon successfully escapes back to Leanne and Nick's secret flat. Peter is then told that the attack makes him appear unstable and therefore likely not a candidate for a transplant. Sharon continues to find ways to track them down, eventually leading to Sam getting kidnapped. Nick returns to the street upon hearing the news and when Sam is safe, Nick enters a taxi whose driver is revealed to be working for Harvey. He warns Nick that if Simon and Leanne give evidence against Harvey, he would harm Sam.

== Reception ==
An article discussing young child actors published to The Guardian claimed that Bain's performance as a child actor in the role of Simon "seems to be the nation's favourite". It also described the character as "undeniably cute" and "wise beyond his years", with "great onscreen chemistry with his dad". The author opined that his father Peter's breakup with Leanne would have been "much more tedious" without Simon's performance. The same article pointed out that Simon "has learned to be resourceful...he has survived a fire, a kidnapping, and has gone missing in Blackpool – from where he managed to make his way back to Weatherfield." It also stated that when Simon "joined forces" with Joshua Peacock, they made "a formidable team."

When the character of Simon ran away while in Blackpool and later returned on his own to his father Peter's doorstep, he said "Ah've been on two trains and a bendy bus...Nightmare. Don't suppose there's any chocolate milk going?". An article published to The Independent opined that it was "a line that sums up the sweet-and-sour storylines that have kept Coronation Street going for nigh on half a century: 50 years of chocolate milk and nightmares".

Bain won the "Best Young Performance" award in the British Soap Awards 2011 for his portrayal of Simon.

== See also ==
- List of soap opera villains
