= Blanche Hunt =

Fictional character from Coronation Street

- Coronation Street character
- Maggie Jones as Blanche Hunt (2008)
- Portrayed by: Patricia Cutts (1974); Maggie Jones (1974–2009)
- Duration: 1974–1978, 1981, 1996–2009
- First appearance: 19 August 1974
- Last appearance: 11 December 2009
- Introduced by: Leslie Duxbury (1974); Bill Podmore (1977, 1981); Brian Park (1996)
- Book appearances: Coronation Street: The Complete Saga
- Spin-off appearances: Coronation Street: Pantomime (2005)
In-universe information
- Occupation: Retired
- Mother: Iris Linfield
- Sisters: Beryl Linfield; Irene Linfield
- Husband: Donald Hunt (backstory)
- Daughters: Deirdre Barlow
- Granddaughters: Tracy Barlow
- Grandfathers: Ian Linfield
- Aunts: Maureen
- Nephews: Bradley
- Nieces: Marion
- Other relatives: Amy Barlow

Blanche Hunt is a fictional character from the British ITV soap opera Coronation Street. She was originally played by Patricia Cutts; however, the actress died by suicide after appearing in just two episodes in August 1974. Maggie Jones took over the role, playing Blanche in over 840 episodes from 1974 to her death in December 2009. The character subsequently died off screen in May 2010. Blanche was the mother of Deirdre Barlow (Anne Kirkbride), grandmother of Tracy Barlow (Kate Ford) and great-grandmother of Amy Barlow (Elle Mulvaney). Her storylines have revolved around her family life, various romances and her "acerbic tongue". The character's "gallows humour" has been well received by critics, and saw Jones win The British Soap Award for "Best Comedy Performance" in 2005 and 2008. Blanche has been described as "a true Coronation Street icon".

== Creation and development ==
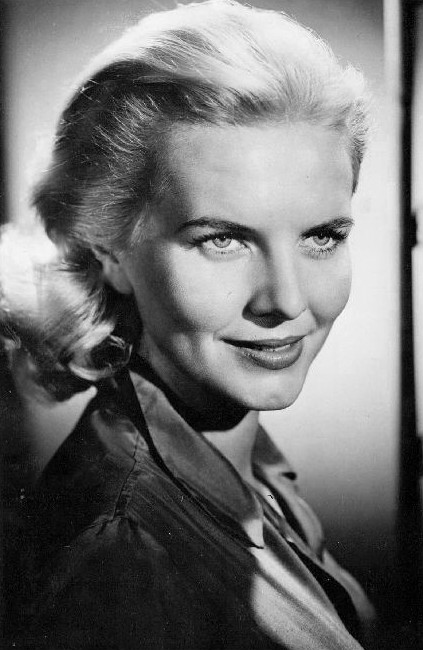
Patricia Cutts (pictured) originally appeared in the role for two episodes, before she committed suicide.

=== Casting ===
Blanche was originally played by Patricia Cutts but died by suicide after appearing in only two episodes. The role was re-cast and given to Maggie Jones, who had also auditioned for the part. She accepted the role at short notice, as storylines for Blanche had already been written. Jones had previously appeared in the show in minor roles in the 1960s, as a policewoman and a shoplifter. She appeared in the soap as a series regular from 1974 to 1976, making brief reappearances in 1977, 1978, 1981, 1996 and 1997. She returned as a series regular in 1998.

=== Departure and death ===
Jones suffered long periods of ill-health in 1999 and 2003 and took time out of the show to recover. Blanche was again written out of the series in October 2009 while Jones recovered from an operation but she never resumed the role, dying on 2 December 2009. Co-star William Roache stated: "I don't think Maggie ever realised how much she was loved not only by everyone on the show but by the millions of Blanche fans out there. She will be greatly missed". Blanche's final scene was broadcast on 11 December 2009, with the 3 December 2009 episode of Coronation Street dedicated to Jones. The producers decided that Blanche would also die. In May 2010 Blanche's friend May (June Whitfield) arrives from Portugal, where Blanche has been staying with her, to break the news of her death.

== Storylines ==
=== 1974–1981 ===
Blanche is introduced as the widowed mother of Deirdre Hunt (Anne Kirkbride). Her bank manager husband, Donald, died in January 1963 after being knocked down outside their house by a black Ford Prefect. Blanche immediately makes her mark by slapping Deirdre's love interest, Ray Langton (Neville Buswell), when she thinks he is treating her daughter badly; she is equally quick to criticise Deirdre when she disapproves of her behaviour. Blanche originally runs a corset business from home but later takes jobs as a barmaid at The Rovers Return and helps Gordon Clegg (Bill Kenwright) run the corner shop.

In 1976, she meets former lover, bookmaker Dave Smith (Reginald Marsh). They rekindle their affair, and she decides to move away to help Dave run his country club in Kenilworth. After her affair with Dave Smith ends, Blanche returns to Weatherfield in January 1977 to help look after her newborn granddaughter Tracy Langton (Christabel Finch), accompanied by Warwickshire vet, Steve Bassett (Dennis Chinnery). They become engaged but split up that May. Following the news of Deirdre moving to New Zealand, Blanche returns to the street in 1978 to talk her out of the idea. In 1981, Blanche returns to Weatherfield for Deirdre's wedding to Ken Barlow (William Roache).

In December 1993, Blanche has a stroke (off-screen) and Deirdre goes to stay with her to nurse her (a storyline devised to cover Anne Kirkbride's sick leave). Deirdre returns to Weatherfield the following year after Blanche has made a full recovery.

=== 1996–2009 ===
Blanche briefly returns to Weatherfield in 1996 when Tracy (now played by Dawn Acton) gets married and again in 1998 after Deirdre is sent to prison following a wrongful conviction for fraud. Blanche begins matchmaking between the divorced Deirdre and Ken, believing Ken is good for Deirdre. She fails, but Tracy gets them to reconcile and in 1999, Blanche returns permanently and moves in with the reunited couple.

Blanche quickly gains a reputation as a gossip and a meddler, with Audrey Roberts (Sue Nicholls) often being the target of Blanche's acid tongue when her 13-year-old granddaughter, Sarah Platt (Tina O'Brien), is revealed to be pregnant. She makes hurtful comments at Sarah but backs down after the birth of her baby daughter, Bethany Platt, when she finally stands up to Blanche and tells her to leave her and her daughter alone. Blanche briefly becomes Rita Sullivan's (Barbara Knox) assistant at The Kabin but soon drives Rita mad with her meddling and tactlessness. In 2002, Blanche has a new love interest, funeral director Archie Shuttleworth (Roy Hudd) but is unhappy when he makes friends with Audrey. Blanche suspects they are having an affair but later discovers Audrey, a hairdresser, is working with Archie to dress dead bodies for viewings. Archie is angry when Blanche spreads this around and ends their relationship. Blanche is upset but later moves on to supposedly wealthy retiree, Wally Bannister (Bernard Cribbins). Wally is more interested in Tracy (now played by Kate Ford), who simply wants Wally's money and decides to seduce him. This falls flat when Tracy visits Wally's house and discovers that he is actually the gardener, posing as the owner, and is not rich at all. Ken and Deirdre find out and disgusted with their daughter, decide to keep the news from Blanche (who is away visiting her sister) to avoid upsetting her.

When her granddaughter Tracy falls pregnant, she tells Roy Cropper (David Neilson) and his partner Hayley (Julie Hesmondhalgh), that Roy is the father and tells them that she will have a termination if they do not want to adopt it. Blanche tries to persuade Tracy to keep the baby by buying No. 7 Coronation Street for them to live in, upsetting Deirdre, who wonders why Blanche never bought a house for her. Tracy gives birth to a daughter and gives the baby to the Croppers, who name her Patience; Blanche sees through Tracy's "indifference" and encourages her to fight for her daughter. Tracy breaks down and Blanche enlists Ken and Deirdre's help to get the baby back. Although they are disgusted when Hayley reveals Tracy sold her daughter for £25,000. Blanche, Ken and Deirdre stand by Tracy, who reclaims her daughter and renames her Amy (Elle Mulvaney). Blanche is relieved when Tracy later admits Roy is not the real father. When Tracy and Amy visit Peter (Chris Gascoyne) in Portsmouth, Blanche moves back in with Ken and Deirdre, renting out (and later selling) the house she purchased to Danny Baldwin (Bradley Walsh). Struggling with a bad hip, Blanche considers using some of the money for a hip replacement operation but later has the operation done privately in Poland where it is cheaper.

In 2007, Blanche supports Tracy when she is accused of murdering her lover Charlie Stubbs (Bill Ward). When Tracy is found guilty and sent to prison, Ken refuses to support her and walks out on Deirdre, who knew Tracy was guilty. Blanche worries that her family is disintegrating and is relieved when Ken and Deirdre reconcile. On 25 June 2007 Blanche holds a mock wake for herself to gauge which of her friends truly appreciate her. She is upset by the low attendance and hearing her friends castigate her negative traits. She resolves briefly to be nicer to everyone by performing acts of kindness around the neighbourhood but quickly reverts to type, believing people should accept her for who she is.

In 2008, Blanche shows her softer side, becoming close to Peter's son Simon (Alex Bain), who finds Blanche's outspoken ways amusing. Blanche is visibly upset when alcoholic Peter turns up drunk to Simon's nativity play and ruins the show. In May 2009, Deirdre discovers that Ken has been having an affair with actress Martha Fraser (Stephanie Beacham). When Deirdre takes Ken back, Blanche is incredulous; tired of her mother's interference, Deirdre orders Blanche to move out of their home. She moves in briefly with Peter, returning to live with Ken and Deirdre after apologising a few weeks later. Blanche often makes barbed references to the event, telling everyone at Peter's AA meeting that "Ken recently had an affair with an actress. Oh, it wasn't Nicole Kidman or Glenda Jackson. She lived on a tugboat". Blanche's tactlessness struck again later that year when Simon's maternal grandparents visited and, after getting drunk, she blurted out that Deirdre had been to prison, Ken had had numerous affairs, Peter was an alcoholic and his fiancée Leanne Battersby (Jane Danson) was a former prostitute.

Blanche's final scenes aired on 11 December 2009, nine days after Maggie Jones' death. In the subsequent episodes, it was revealed that Blanche had unexpectedly been offered a free holiday in Portugal by her friend May Penn and would be spending Christmas abroad. When May hurts her leg, Blanche stays on to look after her. On 3 May 2010, Blanche was due to return; when Peter goes to collect her at the airport he discovers Blanche has died earlier that day, devastating Deirdre. May (June Whitfield) later arrives and explains that the real reason Blanche had stayed in Portugal for so long is that she had fallen in love and become engaged to a man named Arnold. Deirdre is surprised Blanche never told her, and also to hear that Blanche regularly referred to her affectionately as "Dee-Dee".

Ken later finds instructions left by Blanche for her funeral, plus a request for a formal will reading. Blanche leaves her dog Eccles to Ken, with a final barbed comment that he should not take her for walks near canals and theatres "where women of ill-repute may gather". She also makes a dig at Ken's attempts at creative writing, leaving him her Maeve Binchy book collection and describing her as "a proper writer". She also leaves her jewellery to Deirdre, claiming she knew Deirdre had her eye on it, an imitation silver music box to Amy and her late husband Donald's fob watch to Simon. Norris Cole (Malcolm Hebden) is also invited to the reading but all Blanche has "left" him is the chance to be the first to spread details of the will around the street, the only time he would get his hands on a piece of gossip before she did. She leaves her remaining money to Tracy.

== Reception ==
Blanche has been well received by critics and Coronation Street fans. TV critic Patrick Freyne has said of the character: "...Blanche is all curmudgeonly gallows humour and insensitivity; she gets all the best one liners...." In the same article he also praised the quality of writing for the older characters on Coronation Street: "with all the young people wandering around on TV nowadays, with their slang, texting and hippity-hop, it's great to see Coronation Street can still write fantastic older characters. There's prissy, kvetching Norris, long-suffering Rita and saintly Emily. But best of all there's Blanche Hunt, played by Maggie Jones, mother of Deirdre (formerly of the huge glasses) and tormentor of Deirdre's husband Ken..." BBC News named Blanche "Weatherfield's best-loved battle-axe", praising her "brutal honesty and withering put-downs". The Daily Mirror lauded Jones' "superb comic timing" in the role. At the 2005 and 2008 British Soap Awards, Maggie Jones won the award for "Best Comedy Performance" for her role as Blanche. She also won "Funniest Performance" at the 2009 Inside Soap awards. Jones commented at the time that she did not find Blanche funny, explaining:

I don't find her funny and don't think I could play her properly if I did. Blanche genuinely believes what she's saying is right, and doesn't say things for comedic effect. If I started trying to play the lines for laughs, they wouldn't come out right and the performance would suffer. Everyone knows someone like Blanche - or if they don't, they wish they did. We'd all like to be as outspoken as her and have the nerve to say the things she does.

— Maggie Jones, Daily Mirror

"Skirt no bigger than a belt, too much eyeliner, and roots as dark as her soul."

— Blanche on Weatherfield resident Liz McDonald, an example of her "blunt one-liners".

Pop star George Michael stated that Blanche was his favourite soap character, commenting: "When you're as old as her you can get away with saying anything." Following Jones' death, The Daily Telegraph wrote in her obituary: "As a deft exponent of Blanche’s withering one-liners and put-downs, Maggie Jones made the part her own, stealing scene after scene as the acid-tongued widowed mother of Deirdre [...] Maggie Jones's portrayal of Blanche as a meddlesome busybody was beautifully judged and finely understated." They deemed Blanche "a long-term favourite of Coronation Street fans", appraising: "With her trademark scowl and folded arms, Blanche epitomised the tyrannical mother-in-law as portrayed on the seaside postcard." Tim Teeman of The Times appraised: "To many Coronation Street fans Blanche was a finer battleaxe than the legendary Ena Sharples (Violet Carson). To many (including myself), Blanche [...] was our favourite character. She gleefully defied the maxim that if you hadn’t anything nice to say about somebody, you shouldn’t bother saying it. Instead, she broadcast her malevolence from the rooftops and to her victims' astonished, deeply offended faces." Teeman called Jones a "brilliant actress" and noted: "Blanche could be kind, but not often. She and Norris were the great gossip-mongering tag team of the Street, revelling in others' misfortune. Blanche often didn’t have to say anything at all. She’d just purse her lips. That was withering condemnation enough." Low Culture columnist Ruth Deller praised the work of the late Maggie Jones by stating: "even from beyond the grave, she delivered one of Corrie’s best storylines, with the reading of her will providing some classic Blanche moments. She’ll be sorely missed."
