= Lucy Richards =

Fictional character from Coronation Street

- Coronation Street character
- Portrayed by: Katy Carmichael
- Duration: 2002–03
- First appearance: 22 September 2002
- Last appearance: 7 November 2003
In-universe information
- Other names: Lucy Barlow
- Occupation: Florist
- Father: George Wilson
- Husband: Peter Barlow
- Sons: Simon Barlow

Lucy Richards (also Barlow) is a fictional character from the British soap opera Coronation Street, played by Katy Carmichael. She made her first appearance on 22 September 2002. Lucy was introduced as a florist who Peter Barlow (Chris Gascoyne) meets when buying flowers for his girlfriend Shelley Unwin (Sally Lindsay). Lucy and Peter begin an affair and Lucy becomes pregnant with his child. Lucy ends up marrying Peter, but she breaks up with him immediately after when she finds out that he is still engaged to Shelley. Gascoyne believed that Peter was genuinely in love with both women and could not choose, whilst Carmichael believed that Lucy was trying to protect herself from further hurt. After giving birth to his son Simon, Lucy is initially hostile to Peter but she decides to give their relationship another chance. However, when she finds out that Peter committed bigamy by also marrying Shelley, the two wives expose Peter and Lucy later leaves with Simon to live in Australia. Her departure aired on 7 November 2003. In 2008, Lucy was killed-off offscreen in a storyline to facilitate Simon's return to the soap and reunification with his father. The bigamy plot was well-received and nominated for a British Soap Award, whilst Lucy's parenting was praised by Kate White from Inside Soap.

== Development ==
Katy Carmichael made her first appearance as florist Lucy Richards on 22 September 2002. Lucy first appears when Peter Barlow (Chris Gascoyne) goes into her flower shop to buy something for his girlfriend Shelley Unwin (Sally Lindsay). Peter then goes back to see Lucy at her shop when Shelley is working and starts flirting with her, and Lucy accepts his offer of a drink. Lucy and Peter end up having an affair. After the affair is almost exposed, Peter decides to end it and asks Shelley to marry him; however, he then finds out that Lucy is pregnant with his child. Peter tells Lucy that he will marry her and lies that he has broken things off with Shelley.

Peter marries Lucy on the same day as accompanying Shelley to her sister's funeral, and he continues to live a "dangerous double life". In March 2003, days after the wedding, Lucy breaks up with Peter when she discovers that he has not ended things with Shelley as promised, devastating him. Gascoyne explained that Peter dreaded losing Shelley and their baby and that he intended to tell Shelley the truth but the timing was never right and he realised that something like this could have happen as the situation progressed. Gascoyne also believed that Peter thought he would always be able to win Lucy over as he became so good at "worming his way out of things". Peter "frantically" tells Shelley how difficult the situation has become and promises to break up with Shelley, but a disappointed Lucy announces that she is going to leave Peter and Weatherfield "for good", leaving Peter "crushed". Peter tries to fight for Lucy but when he goes to the florist, he finds out that she is already gone. Peter ends up not telling Shelley the truth and she comforts him. Gascoyne explained that Peter needs someone as he is emotional over the situation. The actor added that Peter is "trapped between two worlds" and he really loves Shelley, but Gascoyne also believed that whilst Peter would try to focus on Shelley and forget about Lucy, he will not be able to. The actor added, "He's got a wife and a baby now – and in soapland, he won't get the opportunity to put that behind him!" The actor also noted that Peter would be breaking the law by being a bigamist if he went through with his wedding to Shelley.

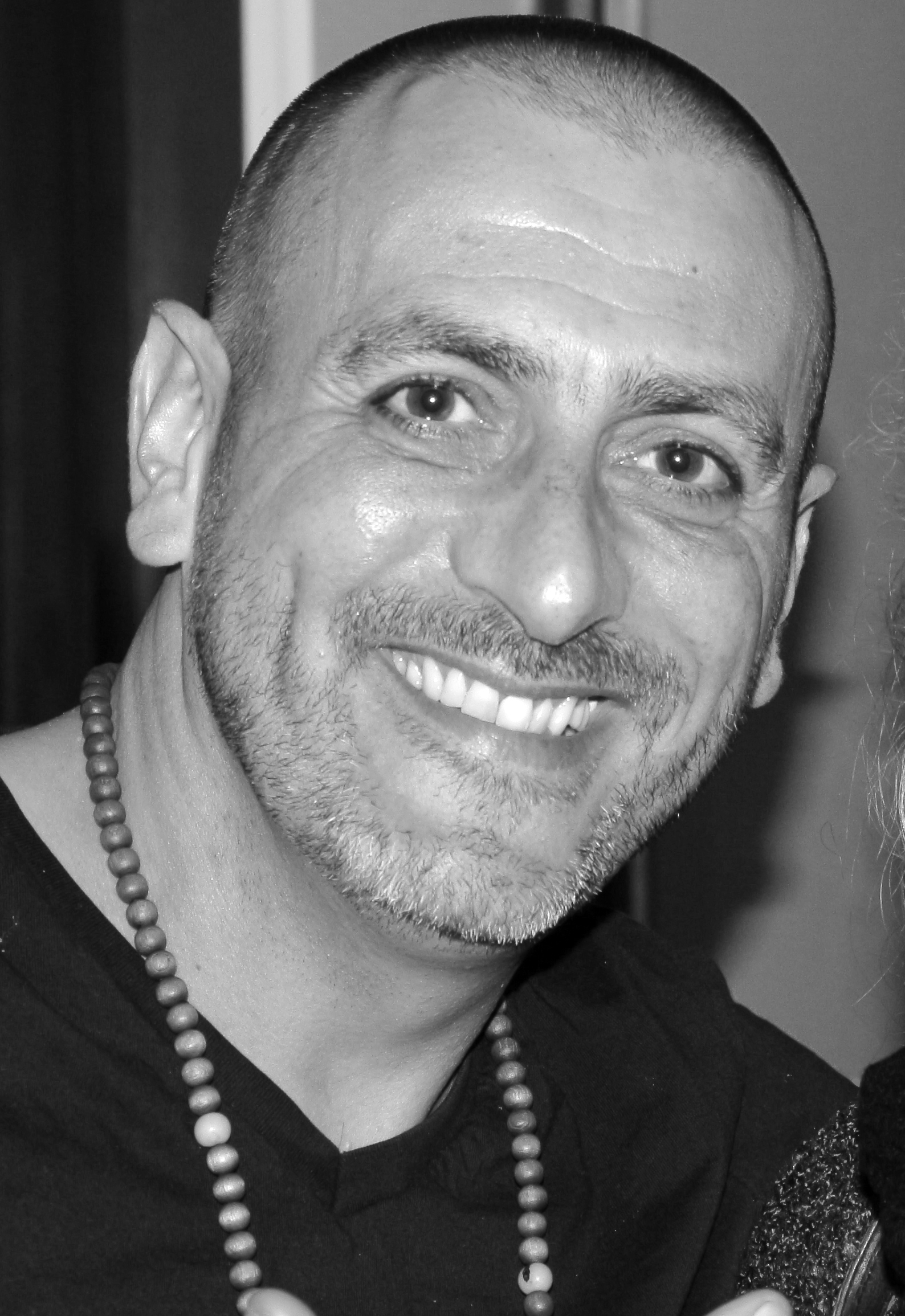
Chris Gascoyne portrays Peter, who Lucy marries.

Things are complicated Peter's friend Ciaran McCarthy (Keith Duffy) spots Lucy at the hospital about to give birth in July 2003. Gascoyne explained that Lucy coming back into Peter's life stirs up emotions which he thought he had hidden, describing it as a "real bolt from the blue". Peter arrives just in time for his son's birth but Lucy is unhappy to see him. Gascoyne revealed that Peter wanted to be at the birth but did not think that Lucy would tell him when the time came, and that Lucy has not been in contact at all since she disappeared. The actor described Lucy as being a very "single-minded" and independent woman, and explained that Peter has been trying to put her out of his mind but has struggled to, especially as he has not been able to talk to anyone about the loss of Lucy and their unborn child. Gascoyne added that he wants to be a father to Lucy's child, especially because of his upbringing with his own father Ken Barlow (William Roache). This leads to Peter missing his wedding church rehearsal which Shelley, which infuriates her. Gascoyne described Lucy and Shelley as being "two very different women" that Peter loves very much, leaving him torn. Peter is also caught between wanting to do the right thing by Shelley and wanting to be in his son's life.

Meanwhile, Lucy is also unsure whether to accept Peter back into her life. Carmichael explained that Lucy is really angry when Peter turns up at the hospital and she initially refuses to see him, adding that Lucy thought that that aspect of her life was over and that "As far as Lucy is concerned, she doesn't have a husband". However, Lucy eventually lets Peter in as it is a difficult birth, which Carmichael believed was because Lucy appreciates "deep down" having someone there with her. The following day, Lucy "gets her senses back" and tells Peter to leave, but Peter feels really moved after seeing his baby, Simon Barlow, born. The actress explained that Lucy wishes they were still "happily married" as they were very good together, but she is also trying to defend herself as Peter hurt her very badly. Lucy struggles with the "basics" of bringing up a baby by herself and starts believing that Peter could help, such as when he turns up with nappies when she needs support; Carmichael believed that Lucy wishes to have a father for her baby and wants it to be Peter, but the actress also acknowledged that the situation is "very messy" as Lucy would be furious if she found out that Peter was planning to marry Shelley, which Carmichael described as "completely immoral".

Peter ends up telling Shelley that about the affair before their wedding, but does not mention that he is married to Lucy. Peter marries Shelley despite still being married to Lucy. He becomes frustrated at the lack of access he is getting to Simon and when he finds out that Lucy has reunited with Dan, her ex-boyfriend, he decides to take a bigger role in Simon's life. Gascoyne explained that Peter loves Simon "to pieces" and wants to help Lucy with his upbringing, but he does not necessarily want Lucy back as he believes that Shelley is the one for him. Peter feels that Lucy is trying to freeze him out of her life when she cancels Peter's visit to see Simon, and Peter is "mortified" when he sees Dan carrying Simon in his arms, with Gascoyne explaining that Peter does not like the thought of someone else being the father to his son rather than Lucy being with someone else. The actor revealed that Peter is planning to divorce Lucy as soon as possible but he does not want to be cut out of Simon's life; however, he teased that Peter still has "too many explosive secrets" and that there would be "huge implications" when Shelley or Lucy discover what he has been up to.

Lucy adores Simon, who is her only child. She then decides to build a life with Peter and searches for him in the hopes that he will resume their relationship. However, she bumps into Shelley, who recognises Lucy from her time as a florist and shows her photos from her wedding to Peter, stunning Lucy. Lucy then returns to show Shelley her wedding photos to Peter, which shocks Shelley and leads to her world falling "apart". Shelley and Lucy then talk and find out the truth about Peter's treatment of them, and Shelley is shocked when Lucy tells her that she gave birth to Peter's baby. Lindsay explained that Shelley is amazed that Peter was discussing starting a family with her when he already had a child with another woman, but she also realises that Lucy is in a worse position as she already has had his baby. Peter then arrives home and finds his two wives together, and Shelley "lets rip" at him. Lindsay said that she had spent a lot of time thinking about this scene due to viewers enjoying "when the moment of truth happens". Lucy later visits Shelley and despite initial bad feelings towards each other, the pair decide to work together to make Peter pay for his betrayal. Lindsay explained that Lucy is not the sort of person Shelley would have as a friend, but she convinces Shelley that there is no point in disliking each other and they should make Peter pay as they are both victims. The pair then go to the police with their marriage certificates to get Peter arrested for bigamy. The pair then continue their revenge by exposing Peter's bigamy to everyone at the Rovers Return pub, which is packed due to Shelley advertising it as happy hour. Shelley introduces everyone to Lucy and Simon, which mortifies Peter, with Gascoyne describing it as one of the worst moments of Peter's life. Now an outcast, Peter's family kick him out and Peter finds a big flower display spelling out "bigamist" at his work due to Lucy and Shelley's "relentless" revenge campaign. Gascoyne believed that the storyline had been done in a clever way and believed that the build-up meant that viewers cared about the characters. The storyline also led to Peter's departure from the soap.

Following the end of the bigamy storyline, Lucy left the soap. A heartbroken Lucy takes revenge on Peter by taking Simon away from his father, and the pair later move to Australia, devastating Peter. Lucy's exit aired on 7 November 2003. After leaving Coronation Street, Carmichael played a bigamist on Waterloo Road, with the actress joking that she asked the producers if it was deliberate. Carmichael believed that people who knew her from Coronation Street would associate her as "a trouble maker, starts off as girl next door, likes a bit of fun, then by the end I've ruined everyone's life". The actress added that she loved working on the soap and believed that all actors should work in a soap opera as "the turnover is so fast, you learn to be spontaneous, and the writing is so good". In 2008, Lucy was killed-off offscreen in a storyline to reintroduce Simon. Lucy dies after being diagnosed with ovarian cancer, and her dying wish is for five-year-old Simon (now Alex Bain) to live with his estranged father; so she tracks Peter down and after her death, Peter and Simon move in with Peter's family in Weatherfield. Lucy's father George Wilson (Anthony Valentine) was later introduced and he tries to take custody of Simon so he can raise him with his wife Eve Wilson (Sabina Franklyn).

== Storylines ==
Lucy first appears when Peter Barlow (Chris Gascoyne) goes into her flower shop to buy flowers for his girlfriend Shelley Unwin (Sally Lindsay) after an argument. Peter later goes back to see her and they flirt and begin an affair. Lucy hires Peter's adoptive half-sister Tracy Barlow (Kate Ford) to work in her flower shop. Peter calls the affair off after Shelley almost finds out, but he proposes to Lucy when he finds out that she is pregnant with his baby. Lucy and Peter get married, but days after the wedding, Lucy finds out that Peter is still engaged to Shelley and she kicks him out and disappears. Lucy later gives birth to Peter's son, Simon Barlow (Daniel Whelan/Jake and Oscar Hartley) and although she is initially hostile to Peter, she decides to give him another chance and tries to track him down. However, she bumps into Shelley and finds out that Peter married her. A shocked Lucy tells Shelley that Peter is also married to her and the pair expose Peter's bigamy to everyone in the Rovers Return Pub. Lucy later emigrates to Australia with Simon; Peter tries to stop her taking his son but she threatens to involve the police. Years later, Lucy is diagnosed with terminal cancer and she tracks down Peter as her dying wish is for Simon (now Alex Bain) to be reunited with his father. Lucy dies and Simon goes to live with Peter.

== Reception ==
A writer from Inside Soap called Lucy's first appearance the "first shoots of a huge future scandal". The bigamy storyline was nominated for "Best Storyline" at the 2004 British Soap Awards. A writer from Inside Soap believed that it would be an easy choice for Lucy to not let Peter back into her life if she knew that he was still planning to marry Shelley. A writer from the magazine also opined that Shelley and Lucy had an "unlikely alliance" in their revenge campaign. They also joked that Lucy found out that "revenge is sweet". Allison Maund from the same magazine believed that Peter was living a "dangerous double life" by being with both Lucy and Shelley and opined that things blew up in his "face" when Lucy broke up with him. Maund's colleague Lara Kilner joked that Lucy should get Peter to pay for 100 black orchids to be delivered to the bookies daily for a year as revenge for Peter's bigamy. Kilner also believed that Peter had ruined the lives of both Lucy and Shelley with his "astonishing double life".

Johnathon Hughes from Digital Spy put Lucy on his list of 11 soap opera characters who "didn't deserve to die off screen" and questioned why her dying wish was for Simon to be reunited with Peter, who he called a "boozing bigamist who couldn't keep it in his trousers". Hughes believed that Lucy's death was a plot device to introduce Simon and wrote, "it's a shame she was chucked away as the character had great potential. Still, it's one less ex of Peter Barlow's wondering around, isn't it?" He also called Lucy a "feisty florist". Hughes' colleague Laura Morgan believed that Simon being the product of Lucy and Peter's "toxic relationship" was one of the reasons that he went "off the rails" when he got older, writing, "it's predictable to go down the route of blaming the parents, but Simon didn't have the steadiest of starts in life". Morgan called Peter and Lucy's affair "steamy" and opined that "shiz hit the fan" when it was revealed that Peter also married Shelley. Claire Crick from the same website called the affair "passionate" and Peter's bigamy storyline "infamous".

A writer from ITVX called Lucy and Peter's affair "illicit" and opined that their "Marital bliss was fleeting" as Lucy found out that Peter was still engaged to Shelley one day after just one day of marriage. A writer from Inside Soap noted that Lucy "wasted no time" in presenting Shelley with her wedding pictures. Kate White from Inside Soap praised Lucy, noting how Simon always came first to her, such as when she moved to Australia to keep Simon "far away from his father's train wreck of a life" and noting her "Nurturing nature". White opined that Simon was the "one good thing" that came from Lucy's "short-lived" marriage to Peter and believed that her death was a tragedy for Simon and left him in the care of the "totally clueless" Peter.
