= Shelley Unwin =

Fictional character from Coronation Street

- Coronation Street character
- Portrayed by: Sally Lindsay
- Duration: 2001–2006
- First appearance: Episode 5034; 9 May 2001
- Last appearance: Episode 6390; 29 September 2006
- Introduced by: Jane Macnaught
- Spin-off appearances: Coronation Street: Pantomime (2005)
In-universe information
- Occupation: Manageress; Pub Landlady
- Father: Jimmy Unwin
- Mother: Bev Unwin
- Sisters: Sharon Unwin
- Daughters: Baby Unwin
- Uncles: Gerald Unwin; Lenny Baker

Shelley Unwin is a fictional character from the British ITV soap opera Coronation Street, played by Sally Lindsay. She is the daughter of Bev Unwin (Susie Blake). Shelley's storylines included a ill-fated relationship with Peter Barlow (Chris Gascoyne) and an abusive and controlling relationship with Charlie Stubbs (Bill Ward), who later left her pregnant.

== Creation and development ==
In January 2001 it was announced that a new barmaid and friend of Duggie Ferguson (John Bowe) was to join and that she would be played by actress Sally Lindsay. She made her first appearance on the soap on 9 May 2001 as a new feisty barmaid. During Shelley's six years on the show she was friends with Sunita Alahan (Shobna Gulati) and was involved in high-profile storylines such as discovering her ex-husband Peter Barlow (Chris Gascoyne) is a bigamist and later being beaten up by her then boyfriend Charlie Stubbs (Bill Ward).

In October 2005, it was announced that Lindsay had quit Coronation Street after six years playing Shelley. Speaking of her departure Lindsay said "I think that Shelley has been through so much as a character during my time here, and I am really looking forward to working on different projects. I have and always will have a massive affection for Coronation Street, and I want to thank all the cast, production team and writers for everything that has happened for me and my character." Producer Tony Wood praised her as a "talented actress" and paid tribute to her portrayal of Shelley's mental abuse at the hands of Charlie, played by Bill Ward. "Sally has been fantastic during her time on Coronation Street – she has done everything that has been asked of her and more," he said.

In January 2010, asked whether she would consider returning Lindsay said "I never say never but there's too much going on in other parts of my career to even contemplate it. Once you are in the Street, you can't do anything else, you can't dip in and out of it, so it would have to be a massive commitment. I have lots of other things to do. I have had a lovely time since I left." Discussing her decision to leave Shelley behind, Lindsay said: "It feels like a million years ago for me because I've never stopped. My heart was in it right until the end. I left before it wasn't. You can't really fake it with a character like Shelley. Leaving was a joint decision by me and Shelley because we'd been through enough."

In January 2025, Lindsay ruled out reprising the role, she said "It has been many years now and I've got my own show and I produce as well, so it's probably not for me, But I absolutely think it's the best thing ever for people to go back, because it's like another world. It's a great job.”

== Storylines ==
Shelley comes to the rescue when they are short-staffed at The Rovers. She worked behind the club bar when Duggie Ferguson (John Bowe) was playing for Weatherfield Rugby League Club and they became good friends so she is devastated when Duggie dies in February 2002. In the pub, Shelley proves to be a popular barmaid. After Fred Elliott (John Savident) buys the pub, Shelley and colleague Geena Gregory (Jennifer James) compete for the position of bar manager. Shelley gets the job and Geena resents this. Shelley settles into the job quite well, though does tend to be a bit too lenient with the staff. Her best friend is Sunita Parekh (Shobna Gulati), who works at the corner shop.

Shelley falls in love with Peter Barlow (Chris Gascoyne) after he leaves the Navy and returns to the Street over Christmas 2001. They move into the flat above the bookies on Rosamund Street together and Peter buys the bookies. They have a rough patch and break up for a while after Peter's friend, Ciaran McCarthy (Keith Duffy), visits and makes a pass at Shelley. She doesn't tell Peter initially but when he does finds out, Ciaran blames Shelley. Peter gets very jealous and Shelley, hurt that Peter didn't believe her, leaves. Once Peter realises that Ciaran is lying, Peter ends the friendship and he and Shelley reconcile. Ciaran returns to Weatherfield for Peter and Shelley's engagement party and stays, much to Shelley's chagrin. Peter and Ciaran renew their friendship and Shelley accepts it but never really trusts Ciaran; who later gets engaged to Sunita.

Peter and Shelley move into the pub when Fred moves in with his son, Ashley Peacock (Steven Arnold) after the death of his former wife, Maxine (Tracy Shaw), but Peter is secretly dating another woman, Lucy Richards (Katy Carmichael), who becomes pregnant. Peter tries to tell Shelley but never manages it as every opportunity is either interrupted or loses his nerve. Just as he is finally about to tell her, a week before he is due to marry Lucy; they learn that her sister, Sharon, has died. Peter marries Lucy on the day of Sharon's funeral but Lucy learns that Peter is still with Shelley and kicks him out. Peter, despite his marriage to Lucy, marries Shelley in July 2003. By the end of the summer, though, Shelley learns that Peter is married to Lucy and they have a baby boy, Simon (Alex Bain). Shelley also throws Peter out and nurses a broken heart while trying to run the pub with her mother, Bev (Susie Blake).

In January 2004, Shelley has an ill-fated date with Newton & Ridley drayman, Eric Gartside (Peter Kay). Eric tries his best to woo Shelley and takes her out for an expensive meal but when they go back to his house for a drink, she is put off by his mother, Dolly. Shelley tells Eric that he is a lovely man but she doesn't think things would work out between them.

Shelley then starts seeing builder Charlie Stubbs (Bill Ward), despite his previous relationship with her mother and unaware that Charlie is still sleeping with Bev behind her back. Bev decides to tell Shelley the truth but Charlie makes sure that Shelley doesn't believe her. Shelley is hurt and frustrated by her mother's constant lies and interference and kicks her out of The Rovers. Devastated that her daughter could believe Charlie over her, Bev leaves Weatherfield but on her return, Liz McDonald (Beverley Callard) is offered a job and a room at The Rovers by Fred. Shelley and Liz don't get on as Shelley had hired Leanne Battersby (Jane Danson) to fill the position left by Bev but Fred insists that Liz gets the job and his choice is final. Charlie soon makes a move on Liz but she pushes him away and tells Shelley, who, true to form, believes Charlie's version of events again. He also persuades Shelley to insist that Liz is sacked, so she leaves Weatherfield briefly to visit Bet Lynch (Julie Goodyear) in Brighton. Charlie and Shelley's relationship continues to seem perfect to Shelley and the other Street residents. When Liz returns, she is reinstated at The Rovers and Charlie tries making a move on her again so Liz doesn't stay, taking a job at the Weatherfield Arms instead. After Liz has left, Shelley gets more and more worried about Charlie cheating. The height of this comes when a drunken Shelley confronts Gail Platt (Helen Worth), who she thinks is having an affair with Charlie. Shelley yells drunkenly at Gail, to which Gail famously replies: "Just go home and sleep it off, you silly girl!", and tells Shelley that Charlie is doing some building work for her. Shelley is ashamed and Charlie tells her that she is stupid. Shelley apologises and he forgives her.

After Maya Sharma (Sasha Behar) burns down Dev Alahan's (Jimmi Harkishin) fleet of businesses, Shelley thinks that as they are friends, and that Charlie could rebuild Dev's shops. Over dinner at Dev and Sunita's flat, Shelley suggests to Dev that Charlie could do the job for mates' rates and he could start as soon as possible, as he doesn't have much work at the moment. Charlie is furious about this and tells Shelley that she has made him look like a fool so Shelley apologises again.

In December 2004, Shelley gets in touch with her mother and they arrange to meet for lunch. Shelley tells Charlie that she is going to a Newton & Ridley Christmas party but he phones the brewery to check and learns that there is no party, making him suspicious. He confronts Shelley who is evasive initially but when Charlie accuses her of seeing another man, she admits that she visited Bev and intends to meet her again. Charlie then insists Shelley phone Bev and tell her that she doesn't want to see her any more. Charlie continues to put Shelley down, and after every phone call, he accuses her of talking to her mother. A few weeks later, Bev visits No. 1 and asks Deirdre Barlow (Anne Kirkbride) to pop next door and fetch Shelley because they need to talk. Shelley lies that everything is fine with Charlie and does her best to convince Bev it is true but Bev asks Deirdre to keep an eye on Shelley as she isn't convinced.

For New Year 2004, Charlie buys Shelley a new dress but it is two sizes too small. Charlie pretends to be upset that he has got the wrong size, but hints that instead of exchanging it, Shelley should go on a diet. Shelley is upset and tells him to get the dress changed but Charlie gives it to Jason Grimshaw (Ryan Thomas), who gives it to his girlfriend, Violet Wilson (Jenny Platt). Shelley is humiliated when Violet comes to work, wearing the dress and makes a scene in front of a pub full of regulars. In the end, Charlie gets his own way again when Shelley decides that it would be a good idea to lose a bit of weight. Charlie slowly isolates Shelley until she ends up hiding in her bedroom for several months and pushes away all her friends, including Ciaran, who leaves Weatherfield. Shelley thinks plastic surgery on her eyes would make her feel more confident so Charlie pays for it. She then suggests they get married and Charlie agrees, but wanting her to feel confident enough to walk down the aisle, he gets her a counsellor called Zack (Ralph Ineson) because she is also retreating from him. However, this backfires when Zack gives Shelley the confidence she needs to start standing up to him. He tries to fire Zack but this seems to be the final push Shelley needs. She and Charlie both go to the church, via a night with another woman, in Charlie's case but Shelley jilts him at the altar and walks home, head held high. She throws Charlie out of the pub and starts rebuilding her life and her friendships.

After Bev agrees to marry Fred, Shelley starts to feel more left out and overshadowed in the pub when Bev starts taking over as landlady before the wedding. Shelley decides she needs a fresh start and gets a job at a country pub in the Peak District but has a one-night stand with Charlie before she leaves, returning later to discuss wedding arrangements and, when Bev confronts her about her not drinking alcohol, she admits that she is pregnant with Charlie's baby. Bev suggests Shelley have a termination but she refuses and insists that Bev keep this secret as she does not want Charlie to know. Bev, needing to talk to someone, tells Deirdre who is horrified because Charlie is now dating her daughter, Tracy (Kate Ford). Deirdre insists she is going to tell Tracy and Tracy confronts her, demanding that Shelley admit she is lying but Tracy realises it is true and tells Charlie, demanding that he make Shelley have a termination. Shelley almost gets away without seeing Charlie but he confronts her. She insists she will keep the baby and never tell the child anything about him or ask him for a penny but he doesn't believe her.

Shelley leaves Weatherfield for the Lake District taking up a job managing a country pub. She later gives birth to a daughter who is mentioned when Bev goes to live with them after Fred's death from a stroke on their ill-fated wedding day.

== Reception ==
Lindsay was nominated for the 2005 British Soap Award for Shelley.
