= Peter Barlow (Coronation Street) =

Fictional character from Coronation Street

- Coronation Street character
- Chris Gascoyne as Peter Barlow (2015)
- Portrayed by: Robert Heanue (1965–1970); Chris Dormer (1970–1971); Mark Duncan (1971); Linus Roache (1973–1975); Joseph McKenner (1977–1978); David Lonsdale (1986); Chris Gascoyne (2000–2023)
- Duration: 1965–1971, 1973–1975, 1977–1978, 1986, 2000–2003, 2007–2023
- First appearance: Episode 450; 5 April 1965
- Last appearance: Episode 11146; 26 December 2023
- Introduced by: H. V. Kershaw (1965); Eric Prytherch (1973); Bill Podmore (1977); Jane MacNaught (2000); Steve Frost (2007); Kim Crowther (2008); Stuart Blackburn (2015); Kate Oates (2016)
- Spin-off appearances: Coronation Street: Text Santa Special (2013)
- David Lonsdale as Peter Barlow (1986)
In-universe information
- Other names: Peter Francis Barlow
- Occupation: Sailor (Royal Navy); Businessman; Bookmaker; Barman; Taxi driver; Pub landlord
- Father: Ken Barlow
- Mother: Valerie Barlow
- Stepmother: Janet Reid; Deirdre Barlow
- Sisters: Susan Barlow
- Half-brothers: Lawrence Cunningham; Daniel Osbourne
- Half-sisters: Tracy Barlow (adoptive)
- Wife: Jessica Midgeley (1990–2000); Lucy Richards (2003–2008); Shelley Unwin (2003; void); Leanne Battersby (2010–2012); Carla Connor (2013–2014, 2021–2024)
- Sons: Simon Barlow
- Grandfathers: Frank Barlow; Alfred Tatlock
- Grandmothers: Ida Barlow; Edith Tatlock
- Uncles: David Barlow
- Aunts: Joyce Tatlock
- Nephews: James Cunningham; Adam Barlow; Bertie Osbourne
- Nieces: Amy Barlow (adoptive)
- First cousins: Darren Barlow
- Other relatives: Nancy Leathers; Albert Tatlock; Beattie Pearson; Ada Broadbent

Peter Barlow is a fictional character from the British ITV soap opera Coronation Street, played by Chris Gascoyne from 2000 to 2023. The character of Peter was born on screen during an episode broadcast on 5 April 1965, along with his twin sister Susan (Katie Heanue, Wendy Jane Walker, Suzy Patterson, Joanna Foster) to parents Ken (William Roache) and Valerie Barlow (Anne Reid). Gascoyne made his first appearance in the role during the 40th anniversary live episode airing on 8 December 2000. Gascoyne left the role in 2003 and returned in 2007 for a brief stint before returning full-time in 2008. In January 2014, it was confirmed that Gascoyne would be leaving once again. His final scenes aired on 14 November 2014. In April 2015, it was announced that Gascoyne would reprise the role for two episodes for the funeral of Deirdre Barlow (Anne Kirkbride), and Peter returned on 15 July 2015 and left once again the following day. In July 2016, it was announced that Peter would be returning as a regular character, with his return airing on 17 October 2016. Peter departed the series again on 26 December 2023. Peter made a voice appearance on 24 January 2024.

Peter's storylines have included a number of affairs, alcoholism and a custody battle involving his son Simon Barlow (Alex Bain). Peter became involved in a bigamy storyline when he married Rovers barmaid Shelley Unwin (Sally Lindsay) and florist Lucy Richards (Katy Carmichael). Having been discovered, Peter was left alone and fled Weatherfield. He returned briefly in 2007 when his adoptive sister Tracy Barlow (Kate Ford) was sentenced to life imprisonment for the murder of Charlie Stubbs (Bill Ward). He returned for good in 2008 with five-year-old Simon, whom he had by Lucy; who had since died from breast cancer. Peter began a relationship with Leanne Battersby (Jane Danson) and they married during the 50th anniversary episode; however, they divorced in 2012 after Peter's affair with Carla Connor (Alison King) was discovered. Peter later went on to marry Carla, and then had an affair with much younger Tina McIntyre (Michelle Keegan). Peter was framed for Tina's murder by Rob Donovan (Marc Baylis) and upon his release from prison, his marriage to Carla broke down and he left Weatherfield.

When he returned in 2016, it was revealed he had begun a relationship with Toyah Battersby (Georgia Taylor), which they agreed to keep secret from a pregnant Leanne, in order to not affect her pregnancy. Simon and Leanne's sister Eva Price (Catherine Tyldesley) soon discovered this, followed by Leanne, and he and Toyah subsequently purchased The Rovers Return, from Steve McDonald (Simon Gregson). They soon begin family planning, with them beginning surrogacy, as Toyah had multiple failed IVF treatments in the past and was unable to conceive naturally. Their baby son was stillborn, and Toyah and Eva secretly agreed to pretend that Eva and Aidan's daughter, Susie, is Peter's daughter, as Eva does not want to be a mother, but Toyah tells Peter after Eva has a change of heart, resulting in their split. Afterwards, Peter buys 50% of the Underworld factory from Alya Nazir (Sair Khan), partnering with Carla, and supports Simon after he is the victim of bullying by former friend Tyler Jefferies (Will Barnett), which results in Peter being shot with a paint gun. Peter also sleeps with Abi Franklin (Sally Carman) and supports Carla after the factory collapses after it is sabotaged by builder Gary Windass (Mikey North), which sees Carla blamed for the death of Rana Habeeb (Bhavna Limbachia). Carla has a mental breakdown before the couple reunite into another relationship before later getting remarried in 2021. In October 2023, Peter runs over and kills serial killer Stephen Reid (Todd Boyce).

== Creation ==
=== Casting ===
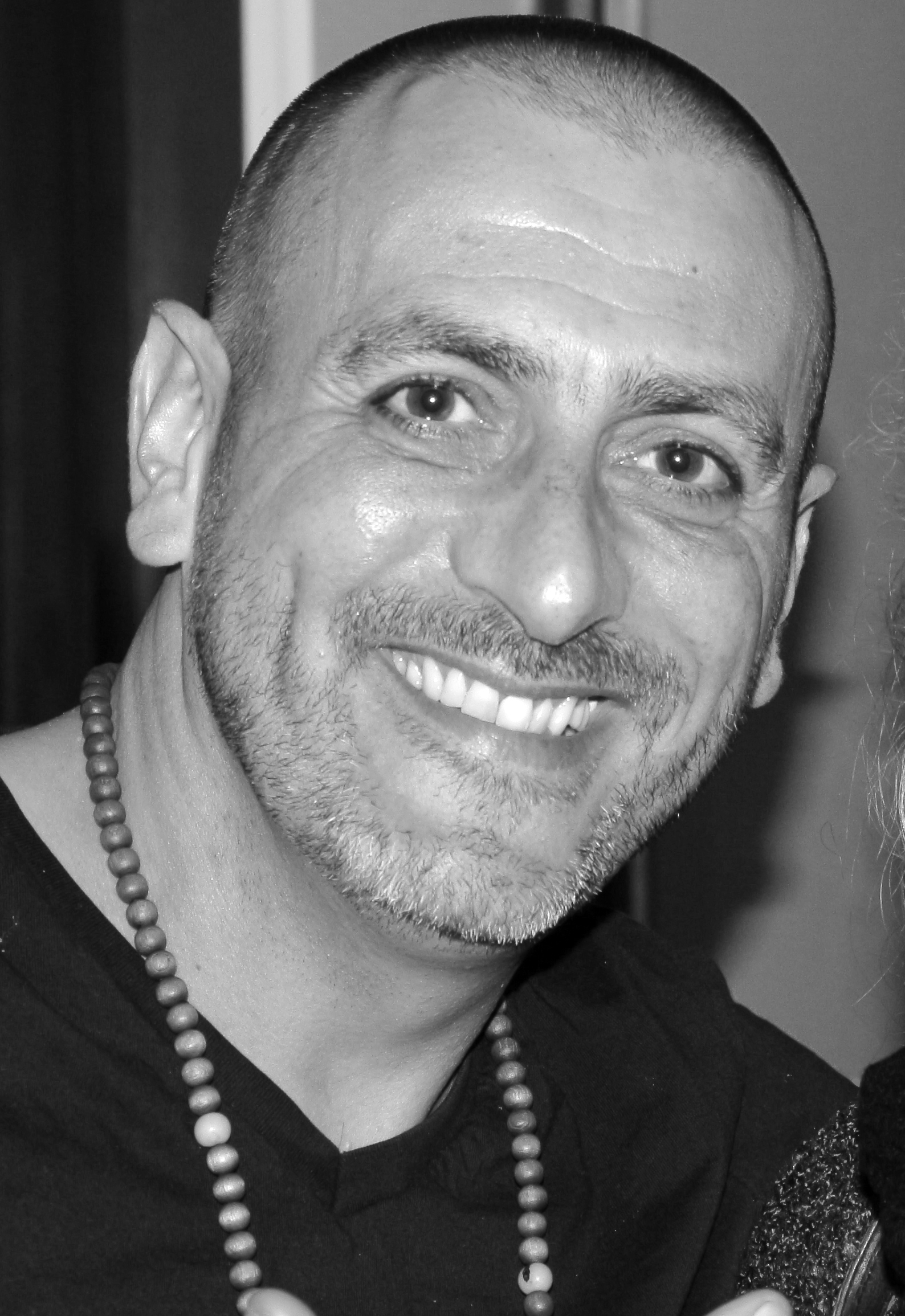
Chris Gascoyne played the role of Peter intermittently between 2000 and 2023.

Robert Heanue was the first actor to portray the character from 1965 to 1970. Chris Dormer played the role from 1970 to 1971 when the 7-year-old actor was written out of the soap due to his parents' emigration to Canada. He did not continue to act and reflected on his time as the young Peter in 2001, "I really enjoyed the Street. I remember Pat Phoenix and Julie Goodyear kissing and tickling me because they thought I was cute. Most of the actors were nice, but some weren't. Violet Carson, who played Ena Sharples, was very grumpy. She didn't like children and really scared me." On-screen Peter and his sister Susan were written out of the soap to live with their grandparents when their mother Valerie Barlow was killed off.

One of the seven actors to have portrayed the character is Linus Roache, the real-life son of William Roache who portrays Peter's father, Ken Barlow in the programme. Linus returned to the show in 2010, playing Lawrence Cunningham, another son of Ken Barlow.

=== Characterisation ===
Upon the character's return to the show in October 2008, Chris Gascoyne spoke of his character's destructive personality in an interview with Digital Spy, he stated, "He's been trying against the odds to sort his life out, but he can't. And when it doesn't work and it all goes wrong for him, he has a drink. There are hurdles in his way all the time. He's stubborn and resents people telling him what to do. He'll listen to advice, but he won't take any notice if he thinks the person giving it isn't in a place to do so. That happens a lot with Ken."

== Development ==
=== Relationships ===
==== Leanne Battersby ====
Peter returns to Weatherfield with his recently discovered son, Simon Barlow (Alex Bain), and Leanne helps Peter as he struggles with fatherhood. Leanne is still "reeling" after her ex-boyfriend, Dan, ends their relationship. Peter returns to Weatherfield a "broken man" and finds fatherhood difficult. Gascoyne told Digital Spy that Peter has not thought about how his relationship with Leanne is progressing. Gascoyne explained that Peter is taking it "step by step", saying "Peter knows that Leanne gets on really well with Simon and I think Peter's nicely surprised by that. Leanne kind of has the upper hand on him and in a strange way, Leanne's a moral voice."

In December 2008, Gascoyne revealed that an upcoming storyline would see Peter enter a rehabilitation facility for his alcohol dependence. Leanne tells Peter's family that she is going to reconcile with him rather than accept a job offer from her friends in Leeds. However, a woman named Christina (Sarah-Jayne Steed) arrives and claims that she met Peter on her father's yacht recently and decided to visit him. Leanne discovers that Peter left rehab early and she decides to leave. The story arc was implemented to facilitate Danson's temporary departure from the show to take maternity leave. Digital Spy reported that Leanne becomes "fed up" with Peter taking her for granted and finds employment in a restaurant in Leeds. Peter attempts to prevent Leanne from leaving by getting Simon to beg her to stay. Despite this, Leanne leaves for Leeds. Leanne's departure was broadcast on 9 March 2009. Leanne made her full-time return on 11 September 2009 when Peter finds her in Leeds. Peter and Leanne later reunite their relationship.

After Peter becomes disabled, Gascoyne said that Peter will be unable to be a proper husband to Leanne. Leanne and Peter's wedding day is coming closer, and Leanne is still having an affair with Nick. When asked to sum up Peter and Leanne's twelve months of marriage, Gascoyne said: "It's been very rocky to say the least. There was the stuff with Nick, Peter was very ill and had to get back on his feet, and there was all the guilt of Ashley dying, so it started off badly and carried on badly. And Peter says he's forgiven Leanne for Nick, but in his heart, it still niggles him." Danson said: "It's not been the best, has it! They had the blessing, where Peter found out about Nick, and then her mother turned up and they argued over that, then she got pregnant and had about half an episode of happiness, and then she lost her baby. And in the middle of all this, Carla's been hovering in the wings..." It was announced in September 2010 that Peter's father, Ken, will catch Leanne in bed with Nick. An insider commented: "Leanne is wracked with guilt over the affair," a source told the paper. "She loved Peter, she loves his son Simon and they've been through a lot together—but Nick was her first love and she never got over that." It was later revealed that Peter will find out from his sister Tracy Barlow (Kate Ford) that Leanne is sleeping with Nick.

==== Carla Connor ====
In September 2010, it was reported that Carla Connor (Alison King) would fall for Peter. These events happened on screen in November 2010. It was reported that the pair apparently grow closer as Peter helps Carla overcome her boozing and comes to her aid when she is arrested for drink driving. A source said: "Carla is feeling vulnerable and Peter is there," a source told the paper. "They soon become more than friends. He's stunned when she tells him she hasn't felt like this about anyone since Liam." Asked what is attracting Carla to Peter, King replied: "In Peter she has found someone who understands what she is going through." Carla's best friend Leanne (Jane Danson), who is in a relationship with Peter, would tell Carla that she is in love with her ex-husband Nick Tilsley (Ben Price), "This storyline will really put the cat among the pigeons," the source added.

Alison King later told Inside Soap that she wants Carla's friendship with Peter to develop even further as he helps her to battle an alcohol addiction. King said: "I think she should definitely get her claws into Peter. They've got a nice friendship and some good banter going on. They're equals, and I think it's the first time Carla's felt that way with someone since Liam died. They could be a great coupling—but it would turn into a nightmare if they both fell off the wagon."

==== Tina McIntyre ====
It was announced in September 2013 that Peter would begin an affair with Tina McIntyre (Michelle Keegan) following his marriage to Carla Connor (Alison King), and will go on until her exit in the summer of 2014. Producer Stuart Blackburn told Inside Soap: "Tina's had a hideous old year with the surrogacy drama and losing Tommy—but she's no saint. She's capable of making mistakes and falling in love with the wrong person. She'll start a feud with Tracy and Rob, before falling into Peter's arms. Unfortunately for Tina, she'll find herself in a place where both Tracy and Carla have reasons to hate her!" Speaking about the story, Gascoyne told TV Times: "Peter is really lustful for Tina. I think he almost sees a younger Carla in her. He found it really exciting when she put up a fight against Tracy. He admired her spirit and started to see her in a different light. Peter adores Carla, but he feels a bit neglected. He even tells Tina that, despite everything Carla has done for him, he's still not happy. Peter knows it's not a good idea to be around Tina, but he really doesn't want to stop seeing her." Gascoyne added, "Put it this way, Peter Barlow and a wedding is bound to spell disaster. It certainly won't be dull. Whatever happens, it will be brilliant. Peter's had a good go at weddings—this will be his fifth. That tells you something." Michelle Keegan revealed that Tina's fling with Peter could be her most passionate relationship yet. Speaking to TV Times about the story, Keegan explained: "Peter had never been on Tina's radar, but suddenly she feels completely out of control. She's never felt like this about anyone before. She didn't really have a passionate relationship with Tommy, but she can see herself having one with Peter." She continued: "Tina is troubled by her feelings because she really likes Carla and she's not the sort of girl to do that to another woman. It's hard because she finds herself weakening whenever Peter is around. It gets to a point where Tina tells Peter that it might be best if she stops looking after Simon because she feels so out of control around him." As the story progresses, Tina begins to hope that Peter will not go through with his wedding to Carla. Keegan added: "If he does, I'm not sure Tina will enjoy sticking around to watch the marriage unfold. The thought of being 'the other woman' pains her."

=== Alcoholism ===
In an interview with ITV Chris Gascoyne said, "Drink is becoming an issue and his self-esteem is low. He can’t see a way out and he can’t imagine doing this for the rest of his life (fatherhood)." During the storyline he described his character as being seen as a coward, adding, "He has the potential to be a very good dad but at the minute he feels like everything is conspiring against him and he hasn’t got the confidence or the self-esteem to cope."

=== Temporary departure ===
In December 2013, it was rumoured that Gascoyne may take a break from the soap. Gascoyne said: "I've signed a new contract that takes me to August 2014, and at this moment I don't know what will happen beyond then, Maybe I will take a break. The character loses something by being here all the time and being ordinary. I'd like to do other stuff. It's like anything, we can get stuck in one place, and that's not necessarily a bad place, but it's not always good for us, is it?" he went on to say: ""I took a four-month sabbatical from the show last summer and spent some time at a Buddhist retreat, and that was a big changing point in my life," he added. "Peter can be a very negative character, and although the storylines were fantastic, I lost myself. Having that break made me realise I can do the same job and still be happy." Gascoyne announced his exit in January 2014 and left in November 2014, he made a guest appearance in July 2015 for Deirdre's funeral.

=== 2016 reintroduction and 2023 departure ===
In July 2016, it was confirmed that new executive producer Kate Oates would be reintroducing Peter, which again would be on a permanent basis. His half-brother, Daniel Osbourne, now portrayed Rob Mallard, was announced to also be returning, as well as his nephew, Adam Barlow, with Sam Robertson reprising his role. Peter returned to the programme during the episode broadcast on 17 October 2016.

On 10 July 2023, Digital Spy confirmed that Gascoyne will leave the show at the end of the year, as he will be spending more time with his family.

== Storylines ==
=== 1965–1986 ===
Peter and his twin sister Susan are born to Ken (William Roache) and Valerie Barlow (Anne Reid). Ken and Val plan to emigrate to Jamaica with the twins as Ken has been offered a teaching post there. While Val is getting ready for a leaving party in the Rovers Return Inn for them, she is electrocuted and killed by a faulty hairdryer. Ken then sends the twins to Glasgow to live with Val's parents; he sees them only sporadically as they grow up.

Peter does not attend Ken's wedding to Deirdre Langton (Anne Kirkbride) in 1981 as he joined the navy after leaving school, but he visits when Susan (Wendy Jane Walker) marries Mike Baldwin (Johnny Briggs). As Ken refuses to go to the wedding due to the feud he and Mike have, Peter makes an emotional appeal, saying that he and Susan had barely seen their father and that he always assumed Ken would step up if his children needed him and he was able to help. Ken reconsiders and attends the wedding.

=== 2000–2003 ===
Peter returns in December 2000 after leaving the Navy and the collapse of his marriage to Jessica Midgeley, who leaves him for another man. He accidentally lets it be known that Susan has a teenage son, Adam Barlow (Iain De Caestecker), fathered by Mike. Deirdre tells Dev Alahan (Jimmi Harkishin), who then tells Mike. Susan (now played by Joanna Foster), who is visiting at the time, attempts to flee when Mike threatens legal action and she is killed in a car crash. Peter is devastated, blaming himself and Deirdre for Susan's death. He starts dating barmaid, Shelley Unwin (Sally Lindsay), but when Peter's old Navy friend, Ciaran McCarthy (Keith Duffy), visits, he makes a pass at Shelley, causing a temporary rift between the couple. Peter later meets florist, Lucy Richards (Katy Carmichael), while buying flowers for Shelley. He is attracted to her and a brief affair occurs but Peter chooses to marry Shelley. Lucy, unknown to Peter, hires his stepsister, Tracy Preston (Kate Ford), to work for her, covering her maternity leave. Tracy informs Peter that her employer is pregnant and Peter realises that he was the child's father. He offers to marry Lucy while still engaged to Shelley, promising her that his other relationship is over. Lucy gives birth to a son, Simon (Oscar and Jake Hartley). When she discovers that Peter is still seeing Shelley, she throws him out and bans him from seeing Simon. Peter is torn between his son and Shelley, but eventually marries her, thus committing bigamy. When both women discover Peter's secret, Shelley throws him out and the two women temporarily take over his betting shop. Lucy tells Peter that she and Simon will emigrate to Australia alone, threatening to expose his crime if he contests her decision. Peter resigns himself to the situation and moves back to Portsmouth.

=== 2007–2023 ===
Peter returns to Weatherfield after Ken contacts him in regards to Tracy's stormy relationship with her boyfriend, Charlie Stubbs (Bill Ward). Tracy later kills Charlie, supposedly in self-defence, and Peter decides to stay when she is charged with murder. Peter later has a brief fling with Maria Sutherland (Samia Ghadie), however, once Tracy is convicted and sentenced to life imprisonment, Peter returns to Portsmouth, taking Adam with him, and ending his relationship with Maria.

Lucy dies from ovarian cancer and Peter is given custody of five-year-old Simon (now played by Alex Bain). Due to his business in Portsmouth failing, Peter brings Simon back to Weatherfield, seeking Ken and Deirdre's help but Ken suspects, correctly, that Peter plans to leave Simon with him. Peter changes his mind when he learns that Lucy had left her estate to him, providing that he used it for Simon's benefit. He buys the local bookmakers and renames it "Barlow's Bookies". Peter begins a relationship with Leanne Battersby (Jane Danson). Peter and Leanne decide to open a bar, but Ken is hesitant about the venture because of Peter's alcoholism. On the opening night of the bar, Peter falls off the wagon and gets drunk and is forced to go to rehab. Peter and Leanne get engaged, but Peter feels threatened by the return of Leanne's ex-husband, Nick Tilsley (Ben Price), until Leanne convinces him that Nick is just a friend. Nick decides to open the bar and offers Leanne a job as bar manager. Feeling guilty for ruining her previous venture, Peter persuades her to take the job and starts mentoring Leanne's friend, Carla Connor (Alison King), when he realises that she also has a drink problem. Carla begins to lean on Peter emotionally for support and she later attempts to seduce him. Peter then tells Carla that he cannot see her anymore.

Peter celebrates his stag do at his and Leanne's former bar, The Joinery, owned by Nick in December 2010. The premises is destroyed by an explosion caused by a problem with the gas supply. Following the explosion, a tram derails and crashes into the street. The bar is destroyed, and Peter is trapped inside. Peter is rushed to hospital with crush injuries to his legs and trauma to his lower back and chest and suffers a cardiac tamponade. Aware that he is unlikely to survive, he marries Leanne in his hospital bed and goes into cardiac arrest moments after the ceremony has concluded. Fortunately, he survives and leaves hospital in a wheelchair.

Peter supports Carla again after her mother dies, and this makes Leanne, who knows about Carla's feelings for Peter, feel insecure and causes several arguments between the two women. Carla is subsequently raped by crooked businessman Frank Foster (Andrew Lancel) and Peter lends much emotional support, to the annoyance of Leanne. Peter begins drinking again and goes to Carla's flat, telling her that she was the woman he loved and that he would leave Leanne for her. He and Carla sleep together that night and have an affair. Leanne finds out about the affair but offers to forgive him and try to work on fixing their marriage, but Peter tells her that he loves Carla. Leanne leaves in a taxi with a tearful Simon running after the car, begging her to stay. Simon then starts misbehaving with Peter as he blames him and Carla for Leanne's departure. When Leanne returns, she fights Peter for custody of Simon and Leanne eventually wins a residency order, at the same time reconciling with Nick. Peter and Carla later get engaged.

Peter begins an affair with Simon's nanny, Tina McIntyre (Michelle Keegan). Carla later finds out that she is pregnant and confides in Michelle Connor (Kym Marsh) that she isn't ready to be a mother. She almost has a termination but cannot go through with it. Carla informs Peter that she is pregnant, and on the same day, Tina also tells Peter that she might be pregnant. Tina's pregnancy scare is later discovered to be a false alarm and Peter vows to stand by Carla and raise their child. Tina asks Peter to move away with her to a new life away from Weatherfield. Peter initially agrees, but after realising how much he loved Carla, he decides to stay in Weatherfield. Upset and angry, Tina threatens to tell Carla about their affair and viciously attacks Peter scratching him on the face. Peter leaves and decides to come clean to Carla about the affair before Tina can tell her. He tells her in the Rovers back room and Carla is devastated by his betrayal. At the same time, Carla's brother Rob Donovan (Marc Baylis) visits Tina and begs her not to tell Carla about the affair but Tina refuses and following a confrontation, falls from the balcony of the builder's yard. When she comes round and threatens Rob, he attacks her with a metal pipe. Peter is devastated when Tina is found seriously injured and hospitalised. Carla throws him out the following day, and he is questioned by the police over Tina's attack. He denies being responsible and is released on bail. Tina later dies of her injuries and Peter finds out when he comes into the pub drunk and begs Carla for another chance. She gives him a bottle of wine and tells him to drink himself to death. Carla later suffers a miscarriage and Rob swears revenge on Peter, blaming him for everything.

The Street turns on Peter in the aftermath of Tina's death, with everyone believing him to be responsible for her murder. A bracelet belonging to Steph Britton (Tisha Merry) that Rob had stolen from the flat to make it look like a burglary, is discovered in the Barlows' garden shed where Rob had accidentally dropped it. Peter is arrested after his fingerprints are discovered on the bracelet, after he had moved it into the kitchen. Peter is charged with Tina's murder and remanded in custody. In prison, Peter discovers that Jim McDonald (Charles Lawson), who is serving a sentence in the same prison for armed robbery, is running an illegal alcohol side venture; hence his nickname "the Landlord". Peter later finds Jim's stash in the prison kitchen, drinks it all and is hospitalised. When he regains consciousness, he asks to see Carla and she comes to visit him. Thinking he is going to die; Peter tells Carla that he believes that she killed Tina and that he will take the blame for her and take her secret to the grave. Carla then realises that Peter is innocent if he genuinely believed her to be guilty. Peter recovers and goes on trial. Whilst giving evidence, Carla tells the court that she believes that Peter is innocent. Despite this, Peter is found guilty of murder and sentenced to life imprisonment with a minimum term of fifteen years before he can apply for parole. Carla eventually discovers that Rob is the killer and reports him to the police. He is arrested and Peter is released from prison with his conviction overturned. He begs Carla for another chance, but she refuses, Peter decides to leave Weatherfield and move back to Portsmouth and Simon begs him not to go but Peter convinces him that it is for the best. Peter briefly returned to attend stepmother Deirdre's funeral and briefly sees his ex-wife Carla, before leaving once again.

In October 2016, Peter arrived back on the street, surprising Ken and Tracy. However, when Ken becomes suspicious about his real intentions for returning, an almighty argument ensues between the pair, resulting in Ken suffering a severe stroke. Peter informs the doctors of the argument and worries that this may have contributed to Ken's stroke, however he is assured that the stroke occurred due to Ken's age. He is adamant for Tracy not to find out, however, she does so when the nurse informs the Barlows of Ken's progress, and so Tracy orders Peter to leave Weatherfield. As he prepared to leave, Peter bumped into his long-time friend Steve McDonald (Simon Gregson), who invites him to stay at The Rovers Return. In 2017, Peter buys The Rovers from Steve and his mother Liz (Beverley Callard), after Steve is ordered to sell up as part of Michelle's divorce settlement. Peter makes his new girlfriend Toyah Battersby (Georgia Taylor) the landlady, with Peter acting as pub landlord. In 2018, Peter and Toyah are delighted when they are informed that their surrogate has fallen pregnant with their baby, however, Toyah later decides not to tell Peter when she learns that the surrogate has miscarried. Instead, she and Leanne's secretly pregnant half-sister Eva Price (Catherine Tyldesley) decide to pass her baby off as Peter and Toyah's, as Eva decides she does not want the baby. After the baby is born and named after Peter's deceased twin sister Susan, however, Toyah decides to reveal all to Peter, who therefore breaks up with Toyah. He sells The Rovers to Johnny (Richard Hawley) and Jenny Connor (Sally Ann Matthews) and moves back in with Ken. With the money from the Rovers, he goes into partnership with Carla at Underworld, however, after 2 months, he sells his shares to Carla's ex Nick. Peter then buys the snooker hall as his new business, however, after playing a game of snooker with Carla, he backs out. Whilst spending New Year's Eve with Carla, Peter confesses to still loving Carla, in which she tells him that she loves him but nothing can happen.

The next day, he wakes up to find that Carla has bought him a boat as a present and he puts it outside Underworld to fix up. Peter enlists Abi to help and eventually sleeps with her. The boat catches fire with Simon inside and this leads to him believing it was Abi who started it, however, it was revealed to be Roy and he chooses not to press charges. Peter then leaves for Southampton with Ken but on the way is stopped by Carla, who confesses she wants to start a relationship again but he turns her down. Not long after, Peter receives a call from Daniel, saying the factory roof has fallen down and a concerned Peter goes back to the street.

As he arrives back, he finds Carla curled up on the floor of the cafe. Peter comforts her before she tells him that she knew the roof was unsafe and after Peter convinced Gary to keep quiet for £10000, he and Carla go back to Southampton to sell the boat. This is soon short-lived as Robert reveals that Carla knew that the roof was unsafe and she moves in with him as Roy tells her to leave. Peter supports her as her mental health deteriorates and during a visit to the medical centre, Carla runs off. As a desperate Peter struggles to find her, he breaks down and drinks, however he is stopped by Ken, and he sobers up before going to rehab. To the annoyance of Ken, he returns sooner and moves back to Roy’s with Carla when she is found but after she attempts to throw herself off the fire escape, he and Simon go to Carlisle whilst she receives professional help.

They return a few months later and after Carla gifts her shares to the staff, she takes a job at the Bistro. Concerned about what this will do to her health, Peter creates a group chat to keep an eye on her but after Carla finds out, Peter gets kicked out but they soon reconcile. In late 2020 after cracks start showing in his relationship he starts helping Abi however when being offered booze after getting mugged he falls of the wagon again. After returning home Carla finds out about Peter drinking and he pushes her away resulting in her sleeping with his nephew Adam. He soon proposes but after finding out about her and Adam Peter falls into a downward spiral hitting his dad and rejecting Carla. him and Carla reconcile a few months later though soon finds out he has liver failure. He soon gets put on the transplant list and remarries Carla in April 2021. A few months later a liver is found but when it is revealed it’s not a match and Peter gets punched and taken of the list. This is soon changed though as Peter then gets put back on transplant list and shortly after moving into the Street Cars flat a new liver is found and he emotionally says goodbye to Carla.

== Reception ==
Ahead of the fire storyline in March 2009, the fire minister Sadiq Khan said: "I would like to thank Coronation Street for highlighting this very important issue. Peter Barlow's actions show how dangerous it is to go to sleep while smoking, putting not only his but his son Simon's life at risk too." The episode in which the fire was screened drew in 10.3 million viewers (42.6% audience share) in March 2009. In 2010, Dan Martin from The Guardian put Peter on his "fantasy hit-list" of characters to be killed-off in 50th anniversary special in order to allow Leanne "to get her groove back", and wrote that he believed that it would create "better drama" if the soap's scriptwriters used the accident to kill-off "major characters we're supposed to care about".

Gascoyne was nominated for the 2011 All About Soap Bubbles Awards for Best Actor (Peter). He was nominated for the 2011 and 2012 British Soap Awards for "Best Actor".

Sarah Ellis of Inside Soap said that Peter was great to watch when he is with Carla; she also opined that the pair are "like a car crash waiting to happen." In 2014, Matt Bramford from What to Watch put Peter's recasting on his list of the 18 best recastings in British and Australian soap operas, commenting that it must have "been dead easy to play father and son" when Peter was portrayed by Linus Roache, William Roache's son.
