= Maggie Jones (actress) =

British actress (1934–2009)

- Jones in the 2000s
- Born: Margaret Jones; 21 June 1934; London, England
- Died: 2 December 2009 (aged 75); Salford, England
- Other name: Margaret Stansfield
- Occupation: Actress
- Years active: 1955–2009
- Spouse: John Stansfield (m. 1971; died 1999)

Margaret Jones (21 June 1934 – 2 December 2009) was an English actress, best known for playing Blanche Hunt in the British soap opera Coronation Street, a role which she first portrayed in 1974 and played regularly from the late-1990s until shortly before her death. She won the British Soap Award for Best Comedy Performance in 2005 and 2008.

== Early life ==
Jones was born in London.

== Career ==
Jones graduated from the Royal Academy of Dramatic Art and performed in numerous plays including Pride and Prejudice and The Women on the West End stage. In 1961 she appeared in one episode of Coronation Street as a policewoman, her first television role.

Jones's first major television role was in BBC's 1967 adaptation of The Forsyte Saga. Jones played the maid, Smither, a small but recurring part. Later, she appeared twice in Nearest and Dearest. Prior to playing Blanche Hunt in Coronation Street her best-known role was as Polly Barraclough in Sam with Mark McManus and she also appeared in the 1971 BBC miniseries adaption of Jane Austen's Sense and Sensibility.

In 1967, several years after her first Coronation Street role, she had another guest role as a shoplifter. In 1974, she made her first appearance as Blanche Hunt, the mother of Deirdre. The part had originally been played by Patricia Cutts, who died after appearing in only two episodes. Jones, who had previously auditioned for the role, accepted an offer to take over the part at short notice as storylines had already been written for Blanche.

Jones remained a regular cast member until 1976. She reappeared in the show briefly when Blanche's grandchild Tracy was born in 1977, when Deirdre's marriage to Ray Langton collapsed in 1978 and when Deirdre married Ken Barlow in 1981.

Throughout the 1980s, Jones was a regular face on British television, appearing in several series. These included The Barchester Chronicles, The Beiderbecke Tapes, In Sickness and in Health, Sharon and Elsie, We'll Think of Something, The Nesbitts Are Coming, Bulman and Lovely Couple, alongside Pauline Quirke.

After guest appearances in shows such as Dalziel and Pascoe, Goodnight Sweetheart, Heartbeat and Peak Practice in the 1990s, Jones reprised the role of Blanche Hunt in Coronation Street in 1996. She became a regular cast member again in 1999. Blanche's trademark withering one-liners and no-nonsense attitude made her a firm favourite of fans of the programme.

In 2005 and 2008, Jones won the British Soap Award for Best Comedy Performance. Jones stated that she did not think of her character as funny and that she "could not play her properly" if she did.

== Personal life, illness and death ==
Jones was a Roman Catholic. She married lawyer John Oliver Stansfield in 1971; he died in January 1999 aged 72, in Westminster, London.

On 18 April 2008, Jones injured her knee and shoulder in a fall at the Manchester hotel in which she stayed while filming Coronation Street. She took two weeks off work from Coronation Street to recover from the accident. She was written out of the series again when she fell ill in October 2009.

In October 2009, Jones was admitted to Salford Royal Hospital for undisclosed major surgery; she was reported to be making a slow and steady recovery. However, her condition later deteriorated and she remained in the same hospital until she died peacefully in her sleep, aged 75, on 2 December 2009.

Her final appearance as Blanche was broadcast posthumously on 11 December 2009. Jones's funeral was held at St. Peter's Catholic Church in Clerkenwell, London on 15 December 2009. A memorial service for Jones took place at Salford Cathedral on 25 February 2010. Tributes came from Coronation Street co-stars William Roache, Anne Kirkbride, Sue Nicholls, Craig Gazey and Brooke Vincent.
