= The Locksmith (TV series) =

British television mini-series

- Genre: Crime drama
- Written by: Stephen Bill
- Directed by: Chris Bernard; Lawrence Gordon Clark; Alan Dossor
- Starring: Warren Clarke; Chris Gascoyne; Sheila Kelley; Sarah-Jane Potts; Polly Hemingway; Kenneth Hadley; James Vaughan; Paul Reynolds; John Simm
- Composer: Colin Towns
- Country of origin: United Kingdom
- Original language: English
- No. of series: 1
- No. of episodes: 6

Production
- Executive producer: Tony Virgo
- Producer: Irving Teitelbaum
- Cinematography: Steve Saunderson
- Editors: Tim Ritson; John Stothart
- Running time: 50 minutes
- Production company: Fair Game Films

Original release
- Network: BBC1
- Release: 25 September – 30 October 1997

The Locksmith is a six-part British television drama series, created and written by Stephen Bill, that first broadcast on BBC1 on 25 September 1997. The series, which stars Warren Clarke and Chris Gascoyne, follows Roland Pierce (Clarke), a locksmith-turned-vigilante who tries to track down the man responsible for a brutal attack on his estranged wife, Carla (writer Stephen Bill's wife, Sheila Kelley), which leaves her with brain damage. The police suspect a local junkie, Paul (John Simm) is responsible, but Roland remains unconvinced and sets out on his own quest to discover the truth.

The series was broadcast at 9:30 pm on Thursdays, and notably broadcast concurrently alongside another series featuring Simm, The Lakes. The series was released on DVD via Simply Media on 19 October 2015.

== Reception ==
Mark Cunliffe for Letterboxd reviewed the series upon its release on DVD, writing; "The cast for The Locksmith is brilliant; Clarke, Kelley and Polly Hemingway perform the central triangle of husband, estranged wife and current, long suffering lover, whilst a younger generation of actors including Chris Gascoyne, Sarah-Jane Potts and John Simm are equally capable in the other roles."

He added; "Watching it back, I'm wondering if The Locksmith was actually intended to be a recurring series as opposed to a one-shot series or mini-series. There was certainly more mileage for a second run of six further episodes, but whether it was ever the intention to or not, it was just not to be."

== Cast ==
- Warren Clarke as Roland Pierce
- Chris Gascoyne as Barry Forrester
- Sheila Kelley as Carla Pierce
- Sarah-Jane Potts as Alice Pierce
- Polly Hemingway as Lesley Bygrave
- Kenneth Hadley as Det. Sgt. Crossman
- James Vaughan as Nigel Cadwallader
- Paul Reynolds as Dixie
- John Simm as Paul
- Julian Kerridge as Ian
- Nirjay Mahindru as PC Tandon
- Rebecca Raybone as WPC Fields
- Stella Moray as Hilda
- James Warrior as Peter

== Episodes ==
No.	Title	Directed by	Written by	Original UK air date
1	"Coming Together"	Alan Dossor	Stephen Bill	25 September 1997
Roland Pierce's life has been built on a belief in law and order. But when his estranged wife is attacked and the police show little interest, he vows to catch the attacker himself.
2	"Full Moon"	Alan Dossor	Stephen Bill	2 October 1997
Carla has survived a brutal attack, but has suffered brain damage and appears not to remember that they are separated. Meanwhile, Lesley urges Roland to marry her.
3	"Victims"	Lawrence Gordon Clark	Stephen Bill	9 October 1997
Frustrated by the police's inability to find Carla's attacker, Roland decides to use his locksmithing skills to set a trap. Meanwhile, Barry gets more than he bargained for when he tries to make some money on the side.
4	"Words and Deeds"	Lawrence Gordon Clark	Stephen Bill	16 October 1997
Now he has caught Paul, the young lad responsible for up to ten burglaries a night in the town, Roland questions him through the night as uncertainty starts to creep in. Slowly, Roland begins to feel further and further out of his depth.
5	"Fire"	Chris Bernard	Stephen Bill	23 October 1997
As Roland tries to come to terms with the previous night's dramatic events, Alice insists that life goes on. Following a serious lapse of professional judgement on his part, Roland finds himself faced with a family trapped in a blazing house.
6	"Ghosts"	Chris Bernard	Stephen Bill	30 October 1997
Roland is devastated when Carla thinks she recognises the lad who attacked her. Meanwhile, when a local councillor loses his car keys while out in the woods with a young lady, Barry thinks he has spotted an opportunity for profit. But has he taken on more than he bargained for?
