= Patricia Cutts =

English actress (1926–1974)

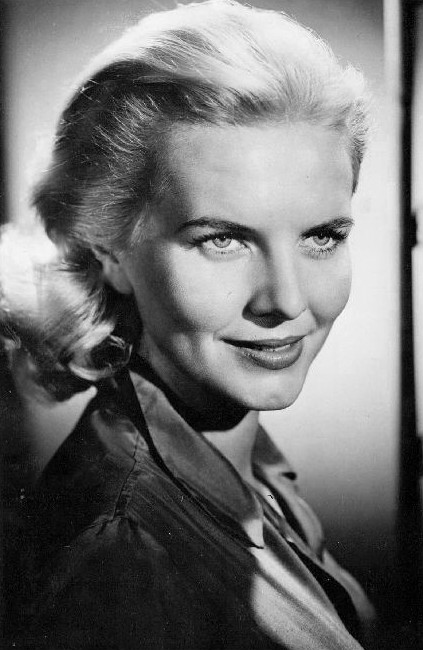
- Cutts in 1958
- Born: 20 July 1926; London, England
- Died: 6 September 1974 (aged 48); Chelsea, London, England
- Other names: Pat Cutts; Patricia Wayne
- Years active: 1946–1974
- Spouse(s): William Nichols (1962–1963) (divorced) John Alexander Cecil Findlay (m. 1950; div. 1957)
- Children: 1

Patricia Cutts (20 July 1926 – 6 September 1974) was an English film and television actress. She was the first person to portray the character of Blanche Hunt in ITV soap opera Coronation Street, appearing in two episodes.

== Early years ==
Cutts was born in London, the daughter of the writer-director Graham Cutts and actress Robin Coles. She attended St. Margaret's School in Hampstead, England, but left at age 14 to work in a chemist's shop. She later studied at the Royal Academy of Dramatic Arts.

== Career ==
Cutts's initial opportunity in show business came when she replaced a performer in the London revue See You Later four days prior to its opening. She said, "I sang and danced and I was just dreadful." She appeared on two British Broadcasting Corporation quiz programs, Down You Go and Make the Connection before she arrived in the United States on a visitor's pass in November 1954.

Her first roles were supporting parts in British films. These ranged from small roles to more substantial ones (such as playing the love interest in Those People Next Door in 1953). She moved to the US in 1958, where she appeared in American movies and television shows. From 1958, she appeared in Alfred Hitchcock Presents and Perry Mason, where she played defendant Sylvia Oxman in the 1959 episode, "The Case of the Dangerous Dowager" and Ann Eldridge in the 1966 episode, "The Case of the Bogus Buccaneers". She continued to work consistently in film and television on both sides of the Atlantic throughout the 1950s, including a small appearance in North by Northwest.

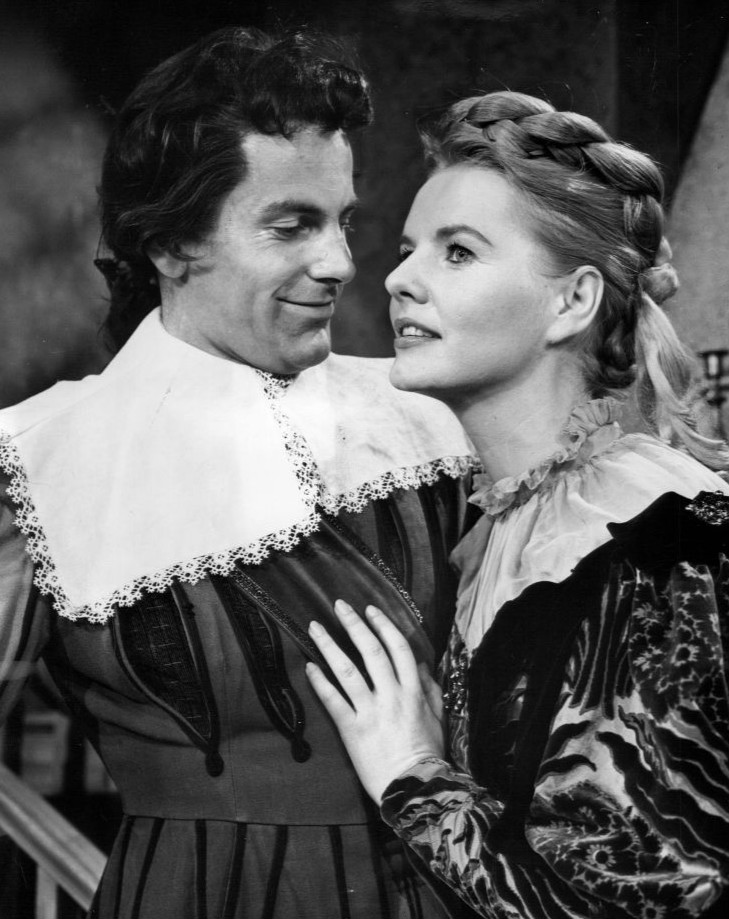
Cutts as Milady de Winter and Maximilian Schell as D'Artagnan in a 1960 television production of The Three Musketeers

In 1959 she appeared on Groucho Marx's quiz show You Bet Your Life with American football coach Jack Curtice as her co-contestant. She was a regular panellist on the DuMont quiz Down You Go and starred alongside Vincent Price in The Tingler. In 1958, she appeared in the film Merry Andrew, starring Danny Kaye. The following year, she had a good role as the second female lead in the war movie Battle of the Coral Sea (1959). In the 1960s, she made guest appearances on such television shows as The Lucy Show; Car 54, Where Are You?; Adventures in Paradise and Playhouse 90.

Cutts (left) with Ann Todd and Angela Lansbury from a 1959 Playhouse 90 production

After several quiet years she returned to the UK and was in the 1972 British television series Spyder's Web before accepting the role of Blanche Hunt in the ITV soap opera Coronation Street in 1974. She appeared in two episodes before her death.

== Personal life and death ==
Cutts married theatrical agent John Alexander Cecil Findlay in 1950. They were divorced in 1957.

In November 1958 Cutts was arrested and put in jail on a felony hit-and-run charge. Police took her into custody at her home two hours after the accident in Hollywood. She was with her attorney and said that she planned to surrender. She was booked as Patricia Findlay (her married name) after being treated at the same hospital where the accident victim was treated. The charge was dismissed in January 1959 after Cutts testified that she tried to identify herself before she left the scene of the accident, including putting her car's registration information on the windscreen of the other vehicle before she left.

Cutts was found dead at her flat in Chelsea, London, aged 48. An inquest into her death produced a verdict of suicide by barbiturate poisoning.

== Selected filmography ==
- Flying with Prudence (1946) – Prudence
- Just William's Luck (1948) – Gloria's Secretary
- I Was a Male War Bride (1949) – Girl in Doorway (uncredited)
- Madness of the Heart (1949) – Girl at bookstall
- The Adventures of PC 49 "Investigating the Case of the Guardian Angel" (1949) – Joan Carr
- Your Witness (1950) – Alex Summerfield, Roger's Sister in Law
- The Long Dark Hall (1951) – Rose Mallory
- Those People Next Door (1953) – Anne Twigg
- The Happiness of Three Women (1954) – Irene Jennings
- The Man Who Loved Redheads (1955) – Bubbles
- 1957 TV series (1957) – Perry Mason
- Alfred Hitchcock Presents (1958) (Season 3 Episode 25: "Flight to the East") – Barbara Denim
- Merry Andrew (1958) – Letitia Fairchild
- North by Northwest (1959) – Hospital Patient (uncredited)
- The Tingler (1959) – Isabel Stevens Chapin
- Battle of the Coral Sea (1959) – Lieutenant Peg Whitcomb
- The Case of the Dangerous Dowager (1959) – Sylvia Oxman
- Yancy Derringer (1959) – Lady Charity, Ep. 20, "Hell and High Water"
- The Alfred Hitchcock Hour (1964) (Season 2 Episode 32: "Body in the Barn") - Samantha Wilkins
- The Case of the Bogus Buccaneer (1966) – Ann Eldridge
- Private Road (1971) – Erica Talbot
