= Katy Carmichael =

English actress (born 1970)

- Born: Katy Jane Carmichael; 5 March 1970 (age 56); Liverpool, England
- Occupation: Actress • director
- Years active: 1991–present
- Spouse: Tristan Sturrock (m. 2005)
- Children: 3, including Bronte

Katy Jane Carmichael (born 5 March 1970) is an English actress, director and producer. She is most known for her roles as Twist Morgan in the Channel 4 sitcom Spaced, Lucy Barlow in the ITV soap Coronation Street, and Melissa Ryan in Waterloo Road. As a director-producer, her work includes the award-winning Mayday Mayday (Bristol Old Vic and St Ann's Warehouse New York).

== Early life ==
Born and brought up in Liverpool as the daughter of two architects, Carmichael attended Gateacre Community Comprehensive School. After six seasons with the National Youth Theatre, she studied for a drama, film and television degree, at the University of Bristol with peers Simon Pegg, Jessica Hynes and Myfanwy Moore.

== Career ==
Her first professional acting role at the age of 18 was Connie in the Liverpool sitcom Bread which she filmed during her university studies. Early in her career, she teamed up with lifelong friend, future Spaced star and writer Jessica Hynes in a comedy double-act called The Liz Hurleys. After leaving university, she began a TV career with the 1950s Liverpool drama And The Beat Goes On (1994), the Galton and Simpson series with Paul Merton, Wing and a Prayer, Death Of A Salesman, and Dennis Potter's Karaoke / Cold Lazarus. She played DC Jo McMullen in Liverpool 1.

Carmichael reunited with Hynes and Pegg to play Twist Morgan in the BAFTA nominated Channel 4 sitcom Spaced. The sitcom lasted for two series. The three also previously appeared together in the short-lived sketch show Six Pairs of Pants (1995).

In 2001, Carmichael starred in her first film, Dead Babies, based on the novel by Martin Amis. She also appeared in Kenneth Branagh's comedy film In the Bleak Midwinter as mad puppetwoman and played the female lead Jane Wells in the period fantasy drama The Infinite Worlds of H. G. Wells. A variety of roles in comedy and drama followed, including Hex, Scarlett, One Foot in the Grave, Clocking Off and Cutting It. In 2002, she landed the role of florist Lucy Richards who became Lucy Barlow in Coronation Street and was involved in the award-winning Peter Barlow bigamy storyline for two years. She went on to play Melissa Ryan (sister of headteacher Rachel Mason) in school drama Waterloo Road in 2009. Carmichael played the mother in Danny Stack's short supernatural thriller Origin (2010). In 2014, Helen the down-trodden housewife in Jimmy McGovern's series Moving On for the BBC and was Hayley Blake, Connie Beauchamp's nemesis, in Casualty (2014–15). She plays Clarity Winlove in The Living and The Dead (2015).

Carmichael appeared in the BBC drama Three Girls and comedy drama film Misbehaviour. She played Ana Oortman in The Miniaturist (2017) She appeared briefly in Disney's Christopher Robin as Christopher's mother. 2020 saw Carmichael take smaller roles in locally filmed dramas in Bristol The Outlaws and The Girl Before and following year she appeared in the medical drama Malpractice directed by Philip Barantini and the Bafta nominated film H is for Hawk directed by Philippa Lowthorpe. She played Stephanie Al Qaq in Prisoner 951. In 2026 she appeared in Episode 4 of Liverpool drama series The Cage for the BBC.

On stage, she played opposite Steven Berkoff in his 3-hander Sturm and Drang and Brighton Beach Scumbags at the Riverside Studios (1995), Yseult -Whitehands with Kneehigh Theatre's international hit Tristan and Yseult (2005–06) (Sydney Festival, US). Work at other theatres includes seasons at the Royal Exchange Theatre, the Liverpool Everyman, The Gate, and The Bristol Old Vic, where she met her future husband actor Tristan Sturrock in a production of The Beaux Stratagem.

In 2010, they set up Bristol based Theatre Damfino together. She has directed the company's projects to date including Mayday Mayday (Bristol Old Vic 2012) winner of the International Fringe Review award (Edinburgh 2012) and selected to play at St Ann's Warehouse New York and Spoleto Festival USA (2013). Mayday Mayday is a drama documentary (afternoon play Radio 4 TX 1 May 2015). The Radio play won the International Third Coast award (US) was nominated for two BBC Drama awards 2016 – best sound design and finalist for best drama production. Carmichael collaborated with Bib Gourmand winning chef Matt Williamson and Guardian food writer Claire Thomson to create the food-theatre show The Table Of Delights, which began as a gourmet tasting and performance experience for adults (Bristol Old Vic, 2013-2014). The children's version of the show premiered at The Print Room at The Old Coronet and received the 2016 Offie for best production for families. Carmichael is creative director of The Table of Delights a food entertainment hub for children sponsored by Yeo Valley and Pukka Tea. She directed singer and songwriter Kate Dimbleby's solo show Songbirds (Tobacco Factory, Bath Ustinov) based on her acclaimed a cappella album. She directs local stage and screen projects with students and young people in her home city Bristol.

As narrator, Carmichael has read several audiobooks, including The Rook by Daniel O'Malley and The Tenant of Wildfell Hall. She has provided voice over for numerous television advertisements.

== Personal life ==
Carmichael has been married to actor Tristan Sturrock since 2005. They have three children together: a son born in 2004, a daughter born in 2006, and a second daughter born in 2010. The middle daughter Bronte Carmichael is also an actress.

== Filmography ==
Year	Title	Roles	Notes
1991	Bread	Connie	S7 E1, 6, 8, 9, 10
1994	Revelations	Caroline Thomas	Episode: "Team Table"
1994	Sunnyside Farm		BBC
1995	Six Pairs of Pants	Various Characters	S1 E1, 2, 3
1995	Joking Apart	Waitress	S2 E3
1995	In the Bleak Midwinter	Mad Puppet Woman	
1996	And the Beat Goes On	Cathy Williams	S1 E1-8
1996	Karaoke	2nd Hostess	Episodes: "Tuesday" and "Friday"
1996	Cold Lazarus		C4
1997	Paul Merton in Galton and Simpson's...	Penny / Sandra Evans	Episodes: "The Suit" and "The Clerical Error"
1998-1999	Liverpool 1	DC Jo McMullen	S1 E1-6, S2 E1-6
1999–2001	Spaced	Twist Morgan	
2000	Dead Babies	Lucy Littlejohn	
2000	One Foot in the Grave	Katy	Episode: "The Futility of the Fly"
2001	The Infinite Worlds of H. G. Wells	Jane Robins	
2002	Bookcruncher	Elsa	
2002	Casualty	Samantha Griffin	
2002	Clocking Off	Miranda Clarkson	Episode: "Mack's Story"
2002–2003	Coronation Street	Lucy Richards	
2004	Hex	Peggy	Episode: "The Release" and "Possession"
2005	Cutting It	Justine Jenson	S4 E4-6
2006	Coming Up	Harris	Episode: "A Paradise Adventure"
2009	Mistresses	Elaine Thompson	S2 E2, 3, 4
2009	Waterloo Road	Melissa Ryan	S4 E1-10, 20
2009	Origin	Claire Holmes	
2014–2015	Casualty	Hailey Blake	
2014	Moving On	Helen	Episode: "The Beneficiary"
2016	The Living and The Dead	Clarity Winlove	BBC
2016	Three Girls	Miss Landale	BBC
2017	Safe	Rachel Delaney	Netflix / Red Productions
2017	The Miniaturist	Ana Oortman	BBC
2018	Christopher Robin	Christopher Robin's Mother (Daphne de Sélincourt)	Disney
2019	The Dumping Ground	Sarah Reeves	BBC
2020	Vera	Gayle Beecher	The Escape Turn
2020	Misbehavior	Margeret	
2021	The Outlaws	Kathy	S1 E4
2021	The Girl Before	Linda Waugh	S1 E3
2022	The Suspect	Bridget Aherne	ITV, 1 episode
2023	Malpractice	Verity Robertson	1 episode
2024	Casualty	Shelley Ryder	Christmas special “All I want for Christmas”
2025	Prisoner 951	Stephanie Al-Qaq	1 episode
2025	H is for Hawk	Professor Campbell	
2026	The Cage	DCI Hanningan	1 episode
