= Sally Lindsay =

English actress and television presenter (born 1973)

Sally Lindsay MBE
- Born: 8 July 1973 (age 53); Stockport, Cheshire, England
- Occupations: Actress; producer; creative director; screenwriter; television presenter; voiceover artist; charity president
- Years active: 1980; 1999–present
- Spouse: Steve White (m. 2013)
- Children: 2
- Website: sallylindsay.com

Sally Jane Lindsay (born 8 July 1973) is an English actress and television presenter. She rose to fame playing Shelley Unwin in the long-running ITV soap opera Coronation Street (2001–2006). Her other roles include Lisa Johnson in the Sky One comedy-drama Mount Pleasant (2011–2017), Alison Bailey in the ITV police procedural Scott & Bailey (2011–2016), and Kath Agnew in the BBC sitcom Still Open All Hours (2013–2019). Since 2021, she has starred as Jean White in Channel 5's The Madame Blanc Mysteries (2021–present), which she co-created and produces.

Lindsay was a regular panelist on the ITV daytime talk show Loose Women between 2011 and 2014. She presented the travel documentary series Sally Lindsay's Posh Sleepover from 2021 to 2022, and has narrated the Channel 5 reality series 22 Kids and Counting since 2021. She is president of the annual charity event Women of the Year and creative director of the production company Saffron Cherry Productions. Lindsay is married to musician Steve White, with whom she has two children.

== Early life and career beginnings ==
Lindsay was born in Saint Mary's Hospital, Manchester living in Burnage she attended a pre-school playgroup with Liam Gallagher before her family moved to Stockport. Her first television appearance was at the age of seven on Top of the Pops when her school choir, the St Winifred's School Choir, released There's No One Quite Like Grandma, which reached number one on the UK Singles chart in 1980.

Lindsay attended St. Winifred's Primary School in Heaton Mersey, Stockport until 1984 when she attended St Anne's RC High School in Heaton Chapel, Stockport, by this time, her family were living in a nightclub, which both her parents managed. Lindsay studied English at the University of Hull and had aspirations of becoming a journalist. However, she was cast in a play and enjoyed the experience, and then studied at North Cheshire Theatre School before dabbling in stand-up comedy.

When she was 24, she met and became friends with comedian Peter Kay. Subsequently they appeared together in Phoenix Nights and in the video for the Comic Relief single "(Is This the Way to) Amarillo."

In 2000 she appeared in an episode of The Royle Family, playing Twiggy's girlfriend Michelle.

== Career ==
=== Coronation Street ===
After winning the "Best Actress" category in the Inside Soap 2005 Awards, Lindsay announced that she would be leaving Coronation Street at the end of her contract to pursue comedy projects, after playing Shelley Unwin for five years. She returned for several episodes in September 2006.

Lindsay was spotted on the set of Coronation Street in 2019 before it was revealed that she was filming a documentary for the show to celebrate its 60th anniversary. She has narrated numerous shows for the programme.

=== Acting after Coronation Street ===
Lindsay voiced the character of Piella Bakewell in the 2008 BBC Wallace & Gromit film A Matter of Loaf and Death which made its British television debut on Christmas Day. She was handpicked for the role by Wallace & Gromit creator Nick Park after he heard her voice on the radio. In 2008, Lindsay took first place on an episode of Celebrity Mastermind on the subject of the Carry On films. Lindsay also appears as a regular guest contributor to the Radcliffe and Maconie Show on BBC Radio 2 and she launched a DVD Sally Lindsay's Party Pub Quiz (2008), shot a role in a comedy pilot Till I Die for the ITV network and starred in a radio comedy for Radio 4 Pick-Ups with John Thomson. In 2010, Lindsay joined the cast of BBC Three sketch show Scallywagga on BBC Three. She also appeared as the tea lady in the second series of the BBC One comedy drama Reggie Perrin co-starring Martin Clunes.

The ITV detective series Scott & Bailey, which began airing in 2011, was developed from an idea conceived by Lindsay and fellow Coronation Street actress Suranne Jones. As a fan of television programmes such as Cagney & Lacey, Lindsay was interested in the concept of a programme detailing the lives of two professional women. She had originally been set to portray the character Janet Scott but, due to the birth of twin sons, was not able to commit to this role. Lindsay appears instead as Alison Bailey, the sister of Jones's character in episodes of all five series though, due to her pregnancy, with only limited appearances in the first series.

From 2011 to 2018, Lindsay appeared in the Sky 1 comedy series Mount Pleasant as Lisa, described as a "real woman in a real marriage living in a real part of Manchester".

Since 2013, Lindsay has played Kath Agnew in BBC sitcom Still Open All Hours. In 2014, she made a guest appearance in an episode of Citizen Khan playing the role of care worker, Sam. In 2015, she played the role of Kathy in the BBC television drama Ordinary Lies. Sally has appeared in the RTS award-winning series Moving On. She later appeared in Channel 5 drama Cold Call, alongside Mount Pleasant co-star Daniel Ryan and Dial M for Middlesbrough on Gold in 2019.

She appeared with actor Nigel Havers in the Channel 5 show Sally and Nigel's Posh Hotel, which was followed up by a show in which they became British Airways cabin crew and a spin-off show in 2021 (without Havers) called Sally Lindsay's Posh Sleepover, featuring Lindsay looking at the lifestyles of the rich and the expensive houses they live in (with places like a townhouse in Mayfair featured).

In April 2021, Lindsay became the interim host of the ITV quiz show Tenable, replacing Warwick Davis for a run of 25 episodes over a five-week period as a result of Davis being unable to film due to scheduling conflicts.

In October 2021, her Saturday night drama series The Madame Blanc Mysteries became one of the most popular new shows on Channel 5, with episodes bringing in around 2.5 million viewers to the channel.

In May 2022 the BBC announced that Lindsay would be one of the guest presenters to take over Richard Osman's role on Pointless.

=== Loose Women ===
In September 2011, Lindsay became a permanent panellist on Loose Women, replacing Coleen Nolan, who decided to leave the show the previous series. On 20 March 2014, she made her final appearance as a panellist.

In Series 16, she appeared a total of 53 times. In Series 17 she appeared a total of 22 times. In Series 18 she appeared 25 times.

=== Theatre ===
After leaving Coronation Street in 2006, Lindsay concentrated on theatre work. In 2006, she played Marilyn Monroe in the musical Ella, meet Marilyn by Bonnie Greer opposite Rain Pryor at the Pleasance Ace Dome in Edinburgh and appeared in The Ho-Ho Club at the King's Head Theatre, Islington, London. In summer 2007, Lindsay played Beatrice in an open-air run of Much Ado About Nothing at Stafford Castle.

Lindsay played Helen in Shelagh Delaney's acclaimed drama A Taste of Honey in November and December 2008 at the Royal Exchange Theatre in Manchester.

Lindsay returned to the Royal Exchange in July 2009, playing Linda in the world premiere of Niel Bartlet's 'Everybody Loves a Winner' for the Manchester International Festival. She then toured with Eve Ensler's The Vagina Monologues, which ended in November 2009.

Lindsay appeared in pantomime in Sleeping Beauty at the Grove Theatre, Dunstable, in December 2017, as the wicked fairy Carabosse, alongside John Partridge (EastEnders) and Rebecca Keatley (CBeebies). In 2018/19 she appeared in Canterbury in the pantomime Cinderella.

== Personal life ==
Lindsay has one brother and she described their parents, Barbara and Tony, "as having quite a fiery marriage". Although their personal finances were tight, her grandparents took her to Italy on five occasions, using subsidised train journeys. She also travelled on an organised school trip to Russia during the USSR era.

In 2013 Lindsay married Steve White, the former drummer of The Style Council and the Paul Weller Band. They have twin sons.

She is a fan of English football side Manchester City FC. Lindsay also appeared in an episode of Through the Keyhole in December 2018, where it was revealed that she lived in Heaton Mersey; the family currently live in London. In 2025, she was interviewed by James O'Brien for his Podcast Full Disclosure.

She was appointed Member of the Order of the British Empire (MBE) in the 2026 New Year Honours for services to drama.

== Filmography ==
=== Film ===
| Year | Series | Role | Notes |
|---|---|---|---|
| 2000 | Old Man and the Silence | Lizzie | Short film |
| 2008 | A Matter of Loaf and Death | Piella Bakewell (voice) | Short film |
| 2018 | Grace & Goliath | Consultant | |
| 2018 | Pond Life | Irene Buckfield | |

=== Television ===
| Year | Series | Role | Notes |
|---|---|---|---|
| 1980 | Top of the Pops | Herself | Performer; as member of St. Winifred's School Choir |
| 2000 | Fat Friends | Amanda | Episode: "Fat Free" |
| 2000 | The Royle Family | Michelle | Episode: "The Christening" |
| 2001 | Phoenix Nights | Tracy Burns | Episode: "Singles Night" |
| 2001–2006 | Coronation Street | Shelley Unwin | Main role |
| 2005 | Coronation Street: Pantomime | Shelley Unwin | Television film |
| 2009 | Al Murray's Multiple Personality Disorder | Shirley | 2 episodes |
| 2009 | The All Star Impressions Show | Dannii Minogue / Tom Jones #4 | Television Special |
| 2010 | Scallywagga | Various characters | Unknown episodes |
| 2010 | Reggie Perrin | Tea Lady | 3 episodes |
| 2011 | Little Crackers | Miss Foley | Episode: "My First Christmas Number One" |
| 2011–2014 | Loose Women | Herself - Co-presenter | Series 16–18; |
| 2011–2016 | Scott & Bailey | Alison Bailey/Newley | Series 1–5 |
| 2011–2017 | Mount Pleasant | Lisa Johnson | Series 1–7 |
| 2013–2019 | Still Open All Hours | Kath Agnew | Series 1–6 |
| 2014 | Citizen Khan | Sam Wallis | Episode: "Naani's Return" |
| 2015 | Ordinary Lies | Kathy | 5 episodes |
| 2015 | Comedy Feeds | Ramona | Episode: "Fishbowl" |
| 2016 | Scrappers | Herself | Narrator; 4 episodes |
| 2017 | Murdered for Being Different | Tracey Maltby | Television film |
| 2018 | Moving On | Cath | Episode: "Two Fat Ladies" |
| 2018 | Ant & Dec's Saturday Night Takeaway | Lynn Foreman | 1 episode |
| 2018 | Diddy TV | Diddy Guest Star | Episode: "Games Bunker" |
| 2018 | Richard Osman's House of Games | Herself | Contestant; Week 1 |
| 2019 | Porters | Linda Porter | Episode: "Baby Mama" |
| 2019 | Cold Call | June Clarke | Miniseries; also associate producer |
| 2019 | Dial M for Middlesbrough | Evie | Television film |
| 2019 | MyBad! | Marie | Television film |
| 2020 | Shakespeare & Hathaway: Private Investigators | Isobel Harris | Episode: "Reputation, Reputation, Reputation!" |
| 2020 | Monty & Co. | Clock (voice) | Recurring role |
| 2020–2022 | The World According to Grandpa | Halifax (voice) | Recurring role |
| 2021 | Intruder | FLO Karen Bailey | Miniseries |
| 2021 | Tenable | Herself | Presenter |
| 2021–present | The Madame Blanc Mysteries | Jean White | Main role; also creator, writer & executive producer |
| 2021–present | 22 Kids and Counting | Herself | Narrator |
| 2022 | Meet the Richardsons | Herself | Narrator |
| 2022 | Pointless | Herself | Assistant |
| 2023 | Midsomer Murders | Danica Trask | Episode: "Book of the Dead" |
| 2023 | Would I Lie to You? | Herself | Episode 8 |
| 2024 | Love Rat | Emma Walters | Miniseries |
| 2024 | The Weakest Link | Winner | Christmas Special |
| 2025 | Richard Osman's House of Games | Herself | Contestant |
| 2025 | Sally Lindsay's 70s Quiz Night | Herself | Host; also executive producer |
| 2025 | Celebrity Puzzling | Team captain | 5 quiz show |
| 2025 & 2026 | Murdoch Mysteries | Nigella Fletcher | "Murder, She Wrote" & "The Maltese Falconer" |
| 2026 | Number One Fan | Donna | Miniseries |

== Theatre credits ==
| Year | Title | Role | Notes |
|---|---|---|---|
| 2006 | Ella, Meet Marilyn | Marilyn Monroe | Pleasance Ace Dome |
| 2006 | The Ho-Ho Club | Various | King's Head Theatre |
| 2007 | Much Ado About Nothing | Beatrice | Stafford Castle |
| 2008 | A Taste of Honey | Helen | Royal Exchange |
| 2015–2016 | Dick Whittington | Fairy Godmother | Liverpool Empire |
| 2017–2018 | Sleeping Beauty | Wicked Queen | Grove Theatre |
| 2018–2019 | Cinderella | Fairy Godmother | Marlowe Theatre |
