= Alex Bain (actor) =

English actor

- Born: Alexander Anthony Keith Bain; 25 November 2001 (age 24); Blackburn, Lancashire, England
- Education: Walton-le-Dale High School Bernese School of Theatre Dance and Drama Shockout Arts
- Occupation: Actor
- Years active: 2008–2024
- Known for: Role of Simon Barlow in Coronation Street
- Children: 1

Alexander Anthony Keith Bain (born 25 November 2001) is an English actor. He is best known from his portrayal of Simon Barlow in Coronation Street, a role he portrayed from 2008 to 2024.

== Early life ==
Alexander Anthony Keith Bain was born in Blackburn, Lancashire on 25 November 2001, the son of Debra and Paul Bain. He was always interested in performing arts, and attended dance, drama and musical theatre lessons at the Bernese School of Theatre Dance and Drama from a young age. He attended Griffin Park Primary School in Blackburn, Lancashire and Walton-le-Dale High School in Preston, Lancashire. After finishing there, he went on to train in Musical Theatre and Dance for two years at Shockout Arts in Manchester.

== Career ==
Bain made his first television appearance in an advertisement for Rice Krispies. His first major role was starring in the BBC drama Sunshine, before moving to the role of Simon Barlow in the soap opera Coronation Street, a role which he played from 2008 to 2024.

== Personal life ==
In May 2018, it was reported that Alex was due to become a father with his then girlfriend, whom he was in a relationship with from April 2017 to May 2019. His daughter was born on 2 December 2018. In May 2020, it was reported that Alex has been in a relationship with performer, Mollie, whom he has been with since October 2019; however, he first revealed their relationship when he posted a tribute to her on his Instagram in December 2019. In October 2022, it was announced that the pair have been engaged since October 2021 and only told their parents at Christmas time. They split up six months after releasing the story about their engagement.

== Awards and nominations ==
Year	Award	Category	Result	Ref.
2009	The British Soap Awards	Best Dramatic Performance for a Young Actor or Actress	Nominated	
2009	Inside Soap Awards	Best Young Actor	Won	
2010	The British Soap Awards	Best Dramatic Performance for a Young Actor or Actress	Nominated	
2011	The British Soap Awards	Best Young Performance	Won	
2011	Inside Soap Awards	Best Young Actor	Shortlisted	
2012	The British Soap Awards	Best Young Performance	Nominated	
2012	Inside Soap Awards	Best Young Actor	Won	
2014	The British Soap Awards	Best Young Performance	Nominated	
2014	Inside Soap Awards	Best Young Actor	Shortlisted	
2016	Inside Soap Awards	Best Young Actor	Nominated	
