= Chris Gascoyne =

English actor (born 1968)

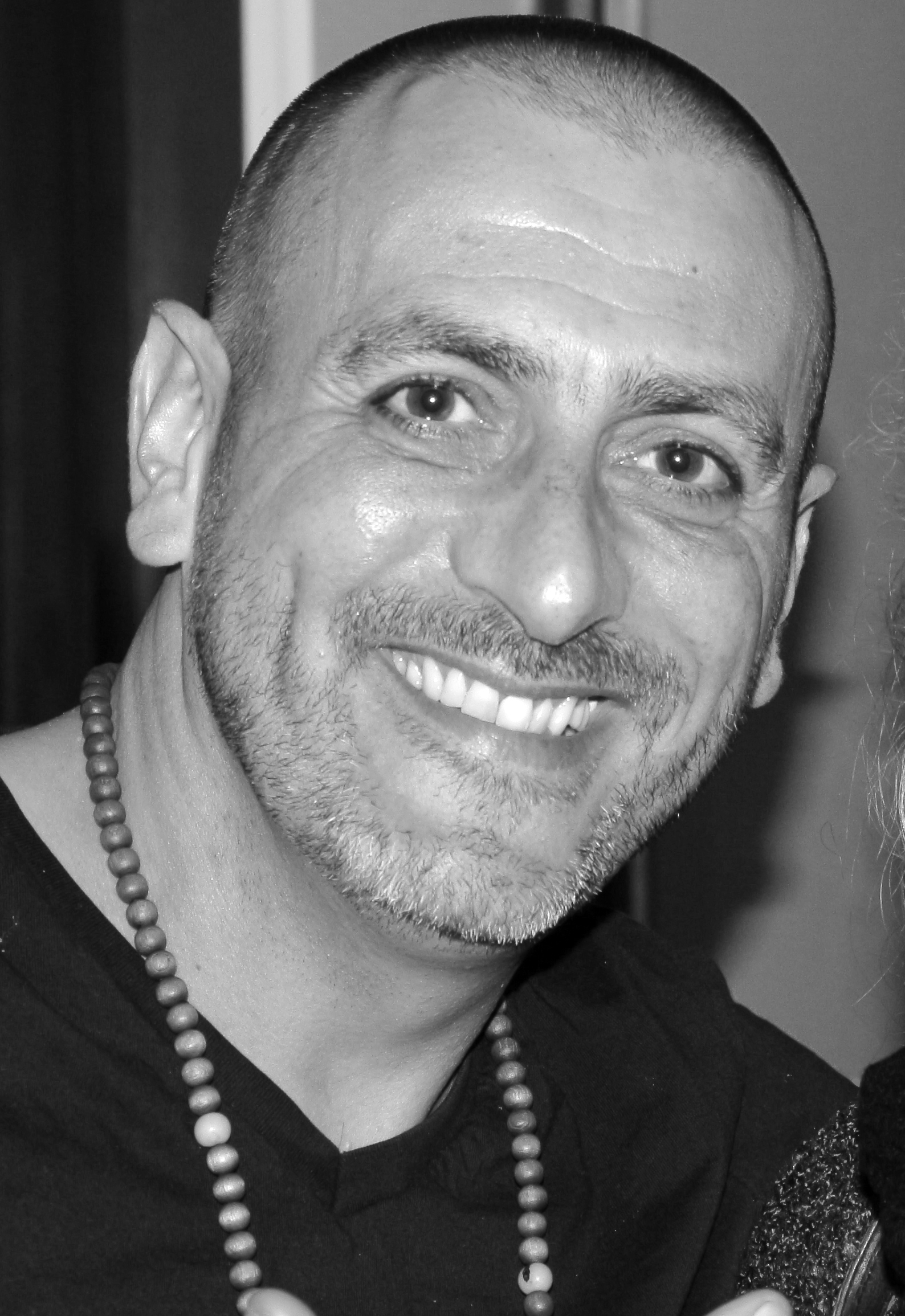
- Gascoyne in 2016
- Born: Chris Gascoyne; 31 January 1968 (age 58); Sutton-in-Ashfield, Nottinghamshire, England
- Education: Royal Central School of Speech and Drama
- Occupation: Actor
- Years active: 1983–present
- Known for: Role of Peter Barlow in Coronation Street (2000–2003, 2007–2023)
- Spouse: Caroline Harding (m. 2002)
- Children: 1 (+ 2 stepchildren)

Chris Gascoyne (born 31 January 1968) is an English film, theatre and television actor. He is best known for his role as Peter Barlow in the soap opera Coronation Street. He made his first appearance in December 2000 during a live, 50 minute episode for the show's 40th anniversary.

== Early life ==
Gascoyne was born on 31 January 1968 in Sutton-in-Ashfield, Nottinghamshire, England and grew up in a working class family. Both his grandfathers worked down the mines and his father Derrik was a greengrocer and florist who later became a milkman.

Gascoyne also spent a significant part of his early life in Gateshead in the North East living with his mother and grandparents. He was very close to his grandfather, Tom and Irish grandmother, Kitty. They later came to live with the family in Sutton-in-Ashfield after his grandmother was diagnosed with early onset dementia and his grandfather's failing health.

As a teenager, Gascoyne later became a member of the Central Workshop in Nottingham and subsequently gained a place at the Central School of Speech and Drama in Swiss Cottage, London, from 1989-1992. Other notable actors in his year were: Susan Lynch, Julian Rhind-tutt and Danny Sapani. During his time as a student at Central, he worked as a supermarket shelf stacker and Pizza Delivery driver in Hammersmith.

== Career ==
Gascoyne began his career at the Central Workshop and at the age of 15 where he began appearing in such shows as The Secret Diary of Adrian Mole, The Growing Pains of Adrian Mole and The Bill.

One of his earliest roles was as Judd on Central TV's children's program Murphy's Mob, also performing in the Central Television series for schools Starting Out, released in 1988. Since then, he has acted in numerous television dramas, including playing opposite Warren Clarke in The Locksmith and Timothy Spall in The Thing About Vince. He has also had roles in Between the Lines and made an appearance in Murdoch Mysteries as David Jennings. An appearance in Casualty is also another one of Gascoyne's credits. He also appeared as Fusilier Tony Rossi in Soldier Soldier. While working in film Gascoyne played the part of a New York Cop in My Last Five Girlfriends starring Michael Sheen.

Gascoyne was cast in the role of Peter Barlow, the seventh actor to portray the role, in Coronation Street. His original spell occurred between 2000 and 2003, before making a brief return in 2007. During his absence after leaving in 2003, Gascoyne joined the cast of BBC drama New Street Law as Al Ware in 2006. He returned the following year on a permanent basis, making his on-screen return on 30 October 2008. Gascoyne took a four-month break in July 2012, before leaving at the end of his contract in November 2014. He returned briefly in 2015 following the death of his co-star Anne Kirkbride, with Gascoyne stating, "Coming back was like a healing process, we laughed a lot". He returned once again on a permanent basis in October 2016.

On 10 July 2023, ITV confirmed that Gascoyne would be leaving the soap after playing Peter Barlow after 23 years, to pursue other acting projects and to spend more time with his family.

=== Theatre Work ===
Gascoyne has worked extensively in the theatre, accepting his first professional role at the age of 18, at the Nottingham Playhouse. After graduating from Central, he joined the Richard Ayre Company at The National Theatre where he performed in The David Hare Trilogy, including Racing Demon, Murmuring Judges and the Absence of War (alongside John Thaw, Michael Bryant and Mark Strong). He appeared twice at The Royal Court Theatre first playing the role of Patsy in David Storey's The Changing Room, as part of the Royal Court Classic Season. He then went on to play the lead role of Jimmy, a cab driver, in Simon Stephens first play Bluebird (directed by Gordon Anderson). He also played the lead part in a new play titled The Ribcage at The Royal Exchange Theatre in Manchester (also directed by Gordon Anderson).

More recently, Gascoyne played Ray Say in Jim Cartwright's classic, The Rise and Fall of Little Voice at the West Yorkshire Playhouse/ Birmingham Repertory Theatre. He then went on to play Clov in Samuel Beckett's Endgame directed by Domonic Hill in a co-production between the Glasgow Citizen's theatre and HOME Manchester, playing opposite fellow Coronation Street actor, David Nielson. Gascoyne was quoted saying: "Beckett is for everyone, not just middle-class intellectuals."

== Personal life ==
Gascoyne married Caroline Harding in 2003. He has three children.

== Filmography ==
=== Film ===
Year	Title	Role	Notes
2009	My Last Five Girlfriends	Detective Lister	

=== Television ===
Year	Title	Role	Notes
1983, 1988	Dramarama	Young Lord Towers / John	2 episodes
1985	The Secret Diary of Adrian Mole	Barry Kent	4 episodes
1987	The Growing Pains of Adrian Mole	Barry Kent	2 episodes
1988	Hard Cases	Michael Joseph Watkinson	2 episodes
1989	Starting Out	Mike Williams	Episode: "A Piece of the Cake"
1989–2007	Casualty	Various roles	5 episodes
1991–1997	The Bill	Various roles	3 episodes
1993	Between the Lines	Nottle	Episode: "Some Must Watch"
1995	Peak Practice	Joe Rawlings	Episode: "Giving Up"
1997	The Locksmith	Barry Forrester	6 episodes
1997	Soldier Soldier	Fus Tony Rossi	11 episodes
1998	Duck Patrol	Nick Sampson	Episode: "Duck Turpin"
2000	The Thing About Vince...	Monk	3 episodes
2000–2003, 2007–2023	Coronation Street	Peter Barlow	1,584 episodes
2001	A Touch of Frost	Dr. Bill Hughes	2 episodes
2004	A Thing Called Love	Robbie Gibson	Episode: "True Confessions"
2005	Where the Heart Is	Pete	Episode: "Peaches and Cream"
2006	The Royal	Brian Harris	Episode: "Fever"
2006–2007	New Street Law	Al Ware	14 episodes
2008	Murdoch Mysteries	David Jennings	Episode: "The Prince and the Rebel"
2009	Blue Murder	Alan Gaskell	Episode: "Having It All"
2010	Coronation Street: Tram Crash	Peter Barlow	Television film
2016	Moving On	Uncle Loz	Episode: "Eighteen"
2025	The Feud	Lee	1-6

== Awards and nominations ==
Year	Award	Category	Result	Ref
2010	British Soap Awards	Best Actor	Nominated	
2010	British Soap Awards	Best Dramatic Performance	Nominated	
2011	British Soap Awards	Best Actor	Nominated	
2011	All About Soap Awards	Best Actor	Nominated	
2012	British Soap Awards	Best Actor	Nominated	
