= Clink (TV series) =

British television drama series

- Genre: Drama
- Created by: Colin McKeown
- Written by: Sarah Deane; Karen Brown; Tony Schumacher; Vivienne Harvey; Esther Wilson; Rebecca Manley; Helen Black
- Directed by: Gary Williams; Gillian Kearney; Anya Camilleri; Jodhi May
- Starring: Alicya Eyo; Katherine Rose Morley; Christine Tremarco; Florence Bell; Louisa Hollway; Lu Corfield
- Country of origin: United Kingdom
- Original language: English
- No. of series: 1
- No. of episodes: 10 (list of episodes)

Production
- Executive producer: Colin McKeown
- Producer: Donna Molloy
- Production locations: Huyton, Merseyside
- Editor: Patrick Hall
- Camera setup: Single-camera setup 4K UHD Digital
- Running time: 45 minutes
- Production company: LA Productions

Original release
- Network: 5Star
- Release: 18 April – 20 June 2019

Clink is a British television drama series created by Colin McKeown that premiered on 5Star on 18 April 2019. The cast include Alicya Eyo, Katherine Rose Morley, Christine Tremarco, and Lu Corfield, and focuses on the lives of the staff and inmates of the fictional women's prison BPS Bridewell. The series is produced by LA Productions and distributed by the now-defunct Kew Media Group. McKeown serves as executive producer, while the writing team is headed by Sarah Deane.

The series went into development in late 2018, in which McKeown worked closely with the LA Productions team, in particular, Justine Potter and Donna Molloy, Head of Development and Head of Production, respectively. Filming took place from January to March 2019 in Huyton, Merseyside. Commissioned for a ten-episode first series, the show marks the first-ever original drama production commissioned for 5Star.

A second series of Clink will not be commissioned by 5Star via distribution company Kew Media Group, as the company went into liquidation in 2020.

== Premise ==
Set in the fictional BPS Bridewell women's prison, the series focuses on the emotional heart of a community of women who are thrown together and forced to confront their own realities and, in most cases, accept the consequences of the decisions which have brought them here. From the pregnant, scared Chloe and self-harmer, Laura, to the 'Prison Mother', Joyce, and self-styled queen of the block, Sherri, these women are many things—drug users, robbers, some are killers, and most of them, survivors. Presiding over the women is new Governor Dominique Darby, herself thrust into a hidden world in tragic circumstances, and encounters tremendous challenges throughout her first governorship.

== Production ==
=== Development ===
In September 2018, it was announced that Channel 5 was moving forward with their plans to develop several scripted drama series. The project was initiated in request from Channel 5 Commissioning Executive Sebastian Cardwell followed by a ten-part series being commissioned for 5Star.

Initially, Canadian company, KEW Media Group launched Clink in Cannes after signing a three-year drama co-production partnership deal with Channel 5 in 2018.

The series was designed to appeal to a younger audience, fitting the target demographic of 5Star rather than broadcasting it on the main channel. The series creator, Colin McKeown, producer at British independent company LA Productions, serves as executive producer of Clink. The company is known for their BBC One drama series' including the long-running, Moving On, as well as their television films Reg and Care. Donna Molloy, Head of Production for LA Productions, serves as producer for the series.

Head of Development, Justine Potter, described that, being aided by charities, the people associated with the Liverpool-based drama were able to speak with former prisoner, ex-prison officers and governors, and managers of the mother-and-baby units prior to production to gather insight for character development within the series.

=== Writing ===
The writing team is headed by showrunner and scriptwriter Sarah Deane of LA Productions, while co-writers are predominantly women and include Karen Brown, Vivienne Harvey, Esther Wilson, Rebecca Manley and Helen Black. British author and screenwriter, Tony Schumacher, the only male writer of the series, had written episode three.

It was expected that the series would be compared to every other women's prison drama; however, it was never the intention to copy or imitate them. Deane said that "we want to smash a few stereotypes".

=== Filming ===
Pre-production of the series lasted ten months, and it took ten weeks to film the entire series from January to mid-March 2019. The series was produced in-house and filmed exclusively at 33 Signal Squadron Army Barracks in Huyton, Merseyside, using a Territorial Army barracks and nearby medical centre.

The show was filmed in 4K using three Blackmagic URSA Mini Pro cameras, while a skycam was used for overhead shots. The series was directed by Gary Williams, actresses Gillian Kearney and Jodhi May, and Anya Camilleri, while Tim Pollard served as director of photography. Williams said that "I used to be a DP myself for many years, and I've always been impressed by the look and skin tones that you get out of the URSA Mini Pro. I find it responds very well to light. I've used it before on numerous documentary projects and felt it translated well to drama." And that "Its latitude came into its own shooting with Blackmagic RAW. It meant much more freedom on a shoot that involved a lot of confined spaces that were especially difficult to light. Knowing that all of that detail was in the frame, to begin with, meant we could lift that information out from the blacks or the highlights and put it back during post." Each episode took up to seven days to film and the post production process was overseen by Patrick Hall of LA Productions and was edited at DaVinci Resolve Studio, while the visual effects were carried out at Fusion Studio.

=== Casting ===
Alicya Eyo, having previously appeared in the ITV prison drama Bad Girls from 1999 to 2003 as prisoner Denny Blood, was cast in the leading role of deputy governor Dominique Darby. Having worked with LA production in the past, Eyo has described it as a "very different" series with having similarities to Bad Girls. Of the series, she commented that "The fact that it's a new prison drama jumped out at me," adding that "It has a very different soul and stands alone as a show." The cast include Katherine Rose Morley of the BBC miniseries Thirteen, Lu Corfield, notable for her role in the Netflix series Sex Education, Christine Tremarco, Paul Broughton, Florence Bell, Andrew Ellis and Jennifer Hennessy.

=== Promotional media ===
During post-production of the series, Influential, a public relations and digital marketing agency launched a social media campaign to promote the series through its ten-week broadcast on 5Star in efforts to encourage viewers to watch the series live or on catch-up. Influential worked alongside 5Star's PR team by arranging exclusive interviews with cast and crew, and their key media targets which included national and trade journalists, and a feature on Radio City Talk.

=== Future ===
Following the conclusion of the first series of Clink, Channel 5 had not announced whether the series had been commissioned for a second series. In February 2020, it became clear that the series' production company Kew Media Group was in the process of liquidation. Channel 5 had already severed ties with the company, as did Endemol Shine Group. Channel 5 initially signed a three-year contract deal with Kew Media Group in September 2018 in which they fronted a large portion of the production costs towards six new dramas which Channel 5 had commissioned. Channel 5 announced that they did not expect to negotiate any further financial arrangements again.

In May 2020, Quiver Distribution acquired the rights to all titles in Kew Media's library, in which Clink has been distributed and picked up by several streaming services in countries such as UK, United States, and Australia. However, it is currently unknown if a second series will come into development through the company, or if it will ultimately be commissioned for a television network or streaming service.

== Cast ==
=== Main ===
- Alicya Eyo as Acting Prison Governor Dominique Darby
- Katherine Rose Morley as Chloe Anderson
- Christine Tremarco as Number 2 Governor Sinead Kovac
- Florence Bell as Laura McDermott
- Louisa Hollway as Sherri Simms
- Lu Corfield as Joyce Edevan
- Alexandra D'Sa as Amira Khan
- Paul Broughton as P.O. Brian Trent
- Theo Graham as P.O. Caleb Williams
- Jane Hazlegrove as P.O. Janine Dolan

=== Recurring ===
- Raffie Julien as Heather O'Reardon
- Trudie Goodwin as Prison Governor Alison Hayes
- Suzanne Packer as Dame Stella Regan
- Kerry Peers as Dr. Trish Wendell
- Dinita Gohli as Sami Gilani
- Natasha Jonas as Corinne Nelson
- Laura Morgan as Becky
- Lynn Kennedy as Kelso
- Teri Ann Bobb-Baxter as Idara Adoti
- Liz Hume-Daswson as Nanny Mags
- Caitlin Drabble as Inmate Jess
- Lindzi Germain as Inmate Bella
- Andrew Ellis as Lee McDermott
- Tina Malone as Elaine McDermott
- Kelli Hollis as Maggie Simms
- Liam Ainsworth as Paul Cheam
- Zora Bishop as Tanaz Barani
- Emma Bispham as Mary
- Pauline Jefferson as Theresa Trent

=== Guest ===
- Suzanne Collins as Mrs. Tranter
- Miles LaFrench as Jake Morton
- Mike Neary as Tony Watson
- Merrill Potts as Tania Moodie
- Neil Ashton as P.O. Hill
- Julia Haworth as Midwife Carla
- Emma Rydal as Sophie Matthews
- Sharon Byatt as Letitia May
- Steve Bell as P.O. Hughes
- Marie Crutchley as Caroline Walters
- Nicole Keri as Kesha Lascelles
- Eve Steele as Romi Martin
- Reanne Farley as Louise Cremorne
- John McArdle as Shark
- Zeb as Zeb The Dog
- Joyce Branagh as Leisa
- Simone Saunders as D.C. Thompson
- Mark Stobbart as Julian Flynn
- Shuna Snow as Judge Brinton
- Simone Sales as Niamh McGrady
- Jennifer Hennessy as P.O. Victoria Adams
- Neil Fitzmaurice as Baldwin Flowers
- Eleanor Cooke as Journalist

== Broadcast ==
The series was broadcast on Thursday nights from April 2019 on 5Star at 9:00pm. It was available for VOD streaming on My5.

Despite being shot on 4K resolution, the series is not available to view in that format, nor is it broadcast in 1080i HDTV. The series was screened in standard definition as a HD service is not yet available from 5Star.

== Series ==
No. overall	No. in series	Title	Directed by	Written by	Original release date	UK viewers (thousands)
1	1	"Home"	Gary Williams	Sarah Deane	18 April 2019	301,000
When the governor of BPS Bridewell suddenly suffers an aneurysm, deputy governor Dominique Darby, is offered the position, but is she ready to deal with such a demanding job? A naive new prisoner, the heavily pregnant, Chloe Anderson finds herself behind bars and struggles to cope with her new surroundings until she is taken under the wing of recidivist prisoner, Laura.
2	2	"Parole"	Gary Williams	Karen Brown	25 April 2019	236,000
Joyce becomes distraught as the thought of her impending parole hearing nears and to make matters worse, Idara is removed and placed in segregation. Dominique fails in her attempt to help Sherri with family issues. Laura's plans to have drugs smuggled into the prison go awry. Chloe comforts Laura at a difficult time.
3	3	"Cuts"	Gary Williams	Tony Schumacher	2 May 2019	244,000
Dominique makes another attempt at visiting Alison at the hospital. Sinead questions Dominique on an argument she had with Alison just before her accident. Amira reveals that she has been receiving letters from the mother of the woman she killed requesting to visit her. Caleb finishes his probation and is given some advice from an angry Brian on how to be a professional officer. Sherri continues to threaten Laura to have money and drugs smuggled in, while a desperate Laura is on the brink and searches for a way out.
4	4	"Cribs"	Gillian Kearney	Vivienne Harvey	9 May 2019	217,000
Following Laura's death, Dominique finds herself under fire from the department, while Laura's distraught brother, Lee, has a few unpleasant words for Dominique. Video footage disparaging the prison is leaked online. A new deaf prisoner, Heather O'Reardon, arrives. Chloe goes into labour and gives birth to a baby girl, whom she names Laura; her happiness is short-lived when social services come calling. Dominique's life is placed in danger when Lee makes a reckless decision.
5	5	"Contrition"	Gillian Kearney	Esther Wilson	16 May 2019	260,000
Dominique manages to talk Lee around and offers her support at a tragic time. Chloe returns to prison and holds Dominique responsible for her daughter being taken into care; on top of this, she provokes Sherri into an argument. Amira makes an unexpected revelation when the mother of the woman she killed comes to visit her. Brian is forced to attend to a family matter. Laura's mother, Elaine, reveals a few home truths to Dominique. A heartfelt memorial service is held in honour of Laura.
6	6	"Reform"	Anya Camilleri	Sarah Deane	23 May 2019	217,000
Alison awakes from her coma and Dominique finds herself under suspicion from both Sinead and Brian when Alison tries to remember what happened. Sherri finds a convenient way of dealing a lethal drug within the prison. Amira tries to convince Dominique that she could be innocent of her crime. Chloe frets at the possibility of her violent and recently bailed boyfriend, Paul, gaining custody of Baby Laura and insists the help of Lee to gather information from the outside. Sherri receives a long-awaited visit from her estranged sister, Maggie. Two ex-offenders return to Bridewell to teach the women how to go straight on the outside. Dominique comes up with a positive strategy by organising a boxing match to help the woman, which ultimately causes a severe backlash.
7	7	"Therapy"	Anya Camilleri	Rebecca Manley & Sarah Deane	30 May 2019	149,000
Sherri is diagnosed with possible PTSD due to past trauma and is given the opportunity to undergo Dog Therapy in order to improve her chances for parole; her sister, Maggie, is less than impressed, as she hopes for Sherri to remain inside. Chloe becomes distressed as the possibility of Paul gaining custody of Baby Laura grows closer. Dominique is no closer to revealing who the secret vlogger is. Heather is granted permission to give sign language classes. Sinead tries to get to the bottom of Brian's secretive behaviour. Dominique offers Sinead something she can't refuse. Dominique finally confronts Alison and advises her to tell the truth about what really happened on the night of the accident.
8	8	"Judgement"	Jodhi May	Helen Black	6 June 2019	208,000
Sinead is frustrated as Dominique and Alison hide the truth from her. A depressed Sherri receives another visit from Maggie. Amira delves deeper into any shed of evidence that could prove that she is innocent. Joyce is overwhelmed when she receives an unexpected message from Idara. Brian continues to have personal problems, however, when he is questioned over Laura's death during an investigation, his problems begin to escalate. Chloe's trial is a success and she is released; having nowhere to go, she is forced to return to her life with Paul. Things eventually take a devastating turn for Chloe.
9	9	"Changes"	Jodhi May	Esther Wilson	13 June 2019	199,000
Chloe faces the consequences following Paul's murder and finds herself sharing a cell with a sympathetic Sherri when she is re-admitted to Bridewell. Alison's memory returns and she tells Sinead that she is suffering from Huntington's disease and that Dominique did not attack her. Elaine feigns sympathy for Chloe as a means to have drugs smuggled into the prison. Sherri tells Maggie that she wants nothing more to with her, while Dominique confronts Maggie about her drug connections with the prison and issues her with a warning; however, Maggie reveals that Sherri was Dominique's sister's dealer, which subsequently caused her death. Brian receives word that his mother has died.
10	10	"Endgame"	Gary Williams	Sarah Deane	20 June 2019	163,000
Following the death of his mother, Brian quickly descends down a self-destructive path. Dominique frets during a sudden prison inspection. Chloe receives support from those around her, including Elaine McDermott, while Caleb gives her special permission to visit her friends at McKeown House; Sherri desperately tries to protect Chloe from the drug pushers on the wing. Has the secret vlogger been exposed? Alison flees the hospital and returns to Bridewell. Dominique tries to talk a desperate Brian down from the roof, but has his actions proven fatal for both of them?

== Reception ==
=== Critical reception ===
The series has received mixed reviews from critics and viewers alike. In an unfavourable review for Auto Straddle, a website exclusively aimed at lesbian and bisexual women, it was stated that "Clink hopes to step into the women's prison drama gap left by Wentworth and OITNB". It went on to mention that "Whether Clink can make it that long is another matter though, with dialogue that's 95% cliché and exposition that's clunkier than a lock in a sock to the head." "Sadly, though, Clink's first episode lacks any distinction of its own, yet neither does it have the operatic melodrama of Wentworth, the campiness of Bad Girls or the nuance and quality of OITNB". In a positive review for the Liverpool Echo, Pete Price said that "City-made TV prison drama is ex-CELL-ent!" of creator and executive producer, Colin McKeown, Price mentioned that "he's [McKeown] created a series which bears all the hallmarks of an LA production—rawness, energy, humanity and truth."

In 2021, Clink was ranked at #12 in a poll on the website Ranker, featuring the "Best TV Shows About Women in Prison".

=== Ratings ===
No.	Title	Air date	Weekly ratings		Consolidated ratings		Total viewers	Ref(s)
No.	Title	Air date	Viewers	Rank	Viewers	Rank	Total viewers	Ref(s)
1	"Home"	18 April 2019	265,000	6	36,000	6	301,000	
2	"Parole"	25 April 2019	197,000	6	39,000	6	236,000	
3	"Cuts"	2 May 2019	232,000	8	12,000	8	244,000	
4	"Cribs"	9 May 2019	197,000	12	20,000	11	217,000	
5	"Contrition"	16 May 2019	236,000	7	24,000	7	260,000	
6	"Reform"	23 May 2019	185,000	7	32,000	7	217,000	
7	"Therapy"	30 May 2019	144,000	12	5,000	11	149,000	
8	"Judgement"	6 June 2019	195,000	8	13,000	8	208,000	
9	"Changes"	13 June 2019	188,000	10	11,000	10	199,000	
10	"Endgame"	20 June 2019	158,000	9	5,000	9	163,000	

== Home media ==
=== DVD release ===
The series was released on DVD on 8 November 2021.

=== Streaming ===
The series is available to stream in the UK and U.S. via Amazon Freevee (formerly IMDb TV), and in Australia from Seven Network's streaming service 7plus.

In November 2019, Clink was made available to stream in the United Kingdom as part of Amazon Prime Video.

== See also ==
- Incarceration of Women
- Within These Walls (1974−1978)
- Prisoner (Prisoner: Cell Block H; 1979–1986)
- Bad Girls (1999–2006)
- Wentworth (2013–2021)
