= Play for Today (2025 TV series) =

British television anthology series

- Genre: Drama; Television play Anthology; Social realism Kitchen-sink drama
- Created by: Martha Watson Allpress, Lee Thompson, Simon Warne & Lydia Marchant,
- Based on: Play for Today
- Country of origin: United Kingdom
- Original language: English
- No. of series: 2
- No. of episodes: 8

Production
- Executive producers: Sebastian Cardwell; Allan Niblo; Nathalie Peter-Contesse; Paul Testar; Colin McKeown
- Running time: 45 mins
- Production companies: Vertigo Films; LA Productions

Original release
- Network: Channel 5
- Release: 13 November 2025 – present

Play for Today is a British television strand, produced by Channel 5. It is a continuation of the original BBC One series of the same name, which ran from 1970 to 1984. Like the prior series, it is an anthology of original one-off dramas exploring modern social issues. It began broadcasting on 13 November 2025.

A second series of episodes was confirmed, due for broadcast in 2026. Its first episode aired on 25 September 2026.

== Development ==
In 2025, Channel 5 announced they would revive the series towards the end of that year for a new audience. The project was conceived, following a conversation with Vertigo Films' Allan Niblo. Episodes 1 and 3 were made by Vertigo in London, and the other two by Liverpool-based LA Productions (who had been involved with a similar anthology programme, BBC One's Moving On).

Sebastian Cardwell, Channel 5's head of drama, stated that the series would act as a gateway for new talent, especially those from disadvantaged backgrounds, to enter the television industry.

== Episodes ==
=== Series 1 ===
No.	Title	Directed by	Written by	Original release date	Viewers (millions)
1	"Never Too Late"	Sara Harrak	Simon Warne & Lydia Marchant	13 November 2025	N/A
Elderly Cynthia is forced into a retirement village by her family, but her plans to get evicted go awry when she meets an old flame. Starring: Anita Dobson and Nigel Havers.
2	"Big Winners"	Emma Turner	Martha Watson Allpress	20 November 2025	N/A
A £14 million win in the lottery causes chaos in a decades-long marriage. Starring: Sue Johnston and Paul Copley.
3	"A Knock at the Door"	Daniel Rands	David Whitehouse	4 December 2025	N/A
His career undone by accusations of impropriety with several women, comedian Lenny Bray's life unravels further when a bleeding delivery driver shows up at his home, claiming to have been mugged. Starring: Alan Davies and Nikki Amuka-Bird.
4	"Special Measures"	Jack McLoughlin	Lee Thompson	11 December 2025	N/A
A surprise OFSTED inspection causes havoc in a struggling Liverpool school, which is dealing with demoralised staff, hungry students and a lack of funds. Starring: Jessica Plummer.

=== Series 2 ===
No.	Title	Directed by	Written by	Original release date	Viewers (millions)
1	"Wild"	Brick	Lewis Wren	25 September 2026	N/A
Three old friends on their annual camping trip in the Scottish Highlands find their bond tested when they become lost, supplies dwindle, and long-buried secrets surface, turning adventure into survival. Starring: Daniel Mays, Joel Fry (actor) and Amit Shah (actor).
2	"Village Idiot"	Rhys Aaron Lewis	Samson Hawkins	2 October 2026	N/A
A stubborn grandmother chains herself to her cottage to resist eviction by train developers, only to discover the company liaison is her estranged grandson. Their clash forces both to confront what home truly means. Starring: Phyllis Logan, Max Harwood and Angus Imrie.
3	"Closing Time"	Dan Sloan	Mina Barber	9 October 2026	N/A
Mo is a gifted migrant hiding his culinary ambitions whilst working in his uncle's kebab shop. A late-night encounter with Laila, a lawyer trapped in a stagnant engagement, sparks a passionate affair. Starring: Saira Jackson and Ellora Torchia.
4	"The Quiet Hour"	Margo Roe	Sarah Louise Madden	16 October 2026	TBD
Overworked nurse Riya battles exhaustion, guilt and past mistakes during a chaotic night on an understaffed ward. As emergencies mount and an error nearly claims a life, her composure fractures and her compassion is tested. Starring: Archie Panjabi and Paul Kaye.

== Reception ==
Rachel Aroesti in The Guardian gave the first series two stars out of five, finding it not as daring as the original series. She did, however, praise "Big Winners" and "Special Measures", as well as several performances. Patrick Smith in The Independent awarded the first episode two out of five stars, commending Dobson but finding it too lightweight for a Play for Today. Keith Watson in The Daily Telegraph was similarly critical of the first episode, awarding it one star out of five. The reception was more positive for the fourth and final episode, "Special Measures", with many considering it closer to the social realist tone of the original series. The Big Issue wrote that "It is not until the fourth and final installment of the new run [...] that we get the grit and politics – with the drama set inside an underfunded school." Hannah J Davies of The Independent, however, called the episode "a short, sharp, shock of a drama that squarely takes aim at a broken, underfunded state school system".
