= List of Moving On episodes =

Moving On is a British television anthology series, created and executively produced by Jimmy McGovern, which consists of a series of standalone contemporary dramas, each focusing on a pivotal turning point in the life of one or more of the characters in the featured episode. The first episode, "The Rain Has Stopped", aired on 18 May 2009, and since, a total of 65 episodes have been broadcast.

== Series overview ==
Series	Episodes	Originally released	
Series	Episodes	First released	Last released
1	5	18 May 2009	22 May 2009
2	10	1 November 2010	12 November 2010
3	5	14 November 2011	18 November 2011
4	5	28 January 2013	1 February 2013
5	5	11 November 2013	15 November 2013
6	5	10 November 2014	14 November 2014
7	5	22 February 2016	26 February 2016
8	5	7 November 2016	14 November 2016
9	5	5 February 2018	9 February 2018
10	5	4 February 2019	8 February 2019
11	5	2 March 2020	6 March 2020
12	5	8 March 2021	12 March 2021

== Episodes ==
=== Series 1 (2009) ===
No. overall	No. in series	Title	Directed by	Written by	Original release date
1	1	"The Rain Has Stopped"	Gary Williams	Karen Brown	18 May 2009
A lonely widow who decides to marry her holiday romance finds herself being ostracised by her children and outcast by neighbours. However, it's not until her fiancé-to-be disappears that her friends and family realise how much she loves him. Cast: Sheila Hancock, Emma Lowndes, Paul Fox, Danny Seward and Bhasker Patel
2	2	"Bully"	Gary Williams	Marc Pye	19 May 2009
An angry father whose son is being bullied at school advises him to start fighting back. However, after verbally abusing his next-door neighbour, the boy disappears, and two families at war are forced to unite in an attempt to track him down. Cast: Mark Womack, Lee Boardman, Julia Ford and Claire Keelan
3	3	"Drowning Not Waving"	Gary Williams	Sarah Deane	20 May 2009
A young single woman is forced to sell her house to pay off her increasing debts, but is surprised when an old school friend offers to buy the house and keep her on as tenant. However, she later discovers her old friend has a secret sideline in drug dealing. Cast: Christine Tremarco, Richard Armitage, Jo-Anne Knowles and Sharon Duce
4	4	"Dress to Impress"	Illy	Arthur Ellison	21 May 2009
A young boy is forced to reveal his true sexual identity after his father believes that sexy lingerie found in the cupboard belongs to his wife and that she may be having an affair. But will the boy's revelation re-unite his parents? Cast: Ian Hart, Dervla Kirwan, Jack McMullen, Ramon Tikaram, Neil Fitzmaurice, Eileen O'Brien and Guy Burnet
5	5	"The Butterfly Effect"	Richard Standeven	Esther Wilson	22 May 2009
A single parent working for a homeless hostel is threatened by a youth with a knife, but everyone refuses to believe her. As she becomes more withdrawn and paranoid, only a chance meeting with her attacker is able to convince her that she is not going crazy. Cast: Lesley Sharp, Susan Cookson, Luke Bailey, Joanne Froggatt, Charles De'Ath, Elliott Tittensor and Finn Atkins

=== Series 2 (2010) ===
No. overall	No. in series	Title	Directed by	Written by	Original release date
6	1	"Sauce for the Goose"	Gary Williams	John Fay	1 November 2010
A middle-aged divorcee's life is turned upside down where her son, who is living in South Africa, is attacked and mugged, leaving her ailing mother, for whom she is the main carer, in a difficult position. Cast: Anna Massey, Susannah Harker, Daniel Ryan and Pooky Quesnel
7	2	"Skies of Glass"	Julia Ford	Nick Leather	2 November 2010
A childless couple believe they have been graced with a miracle when an abandoned baby is left in their car. But when the police get wind of her unexpected arrival, the couple believe that contact from the birth mother may be imminent. Cast: Claire Skinner, Shaun Dooley, Teresa Banham, Neil Bell, Ian Curley and Kelli Hollis
8	3	"Skin Deep"	Len Gowing	Lyn Papadopoulos	3 November 2010
An ageing housewife decides to have botox and a tummy tuck in an attempt to impress her former school friends at an upcoming reunion. However, this leads to arguments with her estranged husband, who decides it's the last straw. Cast: Jenny Agutter, Robert Glenister, Nicola Stephenson and Lisa Faulkner
9	4	"Malaise"	Dominic West	Dale Overton	4 November 2010
An ex-convict recently paroled following his role in an armed robbery finds that life on the outside is very different, and soon ends up losing his one lifeline - his job - after coming head-to-head with his wife's new partner. Cast: John Simm, Ewen Bremner and Susan Lynch
10	5	"Letting Go"	Noreen Kershaw	Karen Brown	5 November 2010
A dental nurse is shocked to discover her long-term partner and father of her son has a secret heroin addiction that he has been keeping from her for several years. However, she soon comes to realize that towing a harsh line may not be the best approach. Cast: Naomi Radcliffe, Jack Deam and Maureen Beattie
11	6	"Trust"	Illy Hill	Arthur Ellison	8 November 2010
An elderly ex-boxer takes pity on a young thief trying to burgle his house, and decides to take him under his wing and teach him how to box. However, when his late wife's rings disappear, he realizes he may have been conned from the start. Cast: Roy Marsden, Gerard Kearns and Kieran O'Brien
12	7	"The Test"	Gary Williams	Alice Nutter	9 November 2010
A widow becomes anxious about her new boyfriend after her best friend informs her that he is a wife-beater. But after discovering she has been lied to, the pair come to blows and end up being involved in a car accident. Cast: Corin Redgrave, Hannah Gordon and Maggie Steed. This episode was dedicated to the memory of Corin Redgrave, who died seven months prior to broadcast.
13	8	"Losing My Religion"	Ian Barber	Shaun Duggan	10 November 2010
A married couple fear for their son's safety after he is bullied at school for being gay. However, they soon find solace in a local priest who offers them help and guidance. Cast: Hugo Speer, Ruth Gemmell, Nico Mirallegro, George Irving, Tom Mannion and Jane Lowe
14	9	"Rules of the Game"	Peter Fearon	Sarah Deane	11 November 2010
A young unemployed student finds himself in awe of his elder brother, who has just struck the big time as a footballer. However, an unexpected trip to casualty leads him into the path of a stunning nurse who steals his heart. Cast: Alfie Allen, Richard Fleeshman, Olivia Hallinan, Rebecca Atkinson, Paula Wilcox and Antony Booth
15	10	"I Am Darleen Fyles"	Pauline Harris	Esther Wilson	12 November 2010
A young woman suffering with anxiety and depression finds solace in an elderly care home resident after her boyfriend becomes concerned over the number of phone calls she is making to the emergency services. Cast: Lorraine Ashbourne, Anne Reid, Danielle Henry and Craig Cheetham

=== Series 3 (2011) ===
No. overall	No. in series	Title	Directed by	Written by	Original release date
16	1	"The Milkman"	John Fay	John Fay	14 November 2011
A kind-hearted milkman who shows young local children the tricks of his trade becomes the subject of a false lawsuit after one of his protégés has an accident. Despite no lasting injuries, the boy's mother decides to fake a lawsuit as a way to recoup money against her outstanding debts. Cast: Alicya Eyo, Rob James-Collier, Suzanne Collins and Andrew Schofield
17	2	"Tour of Duty"	Gary Williams	Lena Rae	15 November 2011
A housewife whose husband is away on a tour of duty in Afghanistan finds a cure for her post-natal depression when an exciting new man comes into her life. But when her husband is left badly injured, she is forced to make a tough decision. Cast: Annabelle Apsion, Christine Bottomley, Dean Lennox Kelly and Myles Keogh
18	3	"Punter"	Gary Williams	Arthur Ellison	16 November 2011
A plumber with mounting debts seizes the chance to steal a long-forgotten collection of diamonds from one of his customers. But when he squanders away the proceeds, his world as he knows it begins to tumble down around him. Cast: Reece Dinsdale, Eva Pope, Melanie Kilburn and Paul Usher
19	4	"Donor"	Ian Barber	Shaun Duggan	17 November 2011
A young woman's dreams of starting a family are shattered when her boyfriend reveals that he is infertile. However, she soon suggests that her gay best friend could be a sperm donor; but is he willing to sacrifice his morals? Cast: Warren Brown, Alastair Mackenzie, Sally Phillips and Paul Rhys
20	5	"The Poetry of Silence"	Ian Barber	Esther Wilson	18 November 2011
A university student with an increasing workload contemplates taking his own life, but with the help of his best friend and parents, manages to get himself back on the straight and narrow. But with no job or prospects, he struggles to fill his time. Cast: Fay Ripley, Ben Daniels, Joe Dempsie and Jo Woodcock

=== Series 4 (2013) ===
No. overall	No. in series	Title	Directed by	Written by	Original release date
21	1	"The Shrine"	Noreen Kershaw	Karen Brown	28 January 2013
A couple trying to sell their house finds themselves in a compromising situation when a man is killed in a hit-and-run right on their doorstep. And when the entrance to their front garden becomes a shrine to the deceased, relations with the man’s wife become strained. Cast: Matthew Kelly, Barbara Flynn, Sally Carman, Steve Evets and Neil Bell
22	2	"Visiting Order"	Noreen Kershaw	Collette Kane	29 January 2013
A Norwegian student is forced to choose between her imprisoned father, who is serving life for drug trafficking, and her new boyfriend, after a lockdown during a visiting session results in her missing a romantic dinner for two. Cast: Marian Saastad Ottesen, Rob James-Collier, Bjarne Henriksen and Morag Siller
23	3	"Friends Like These"	Pauline Harris	Shaun Duggan	30 January 2013
A single parent, struggling with money worries and social relationships, finds solace in the parent of a new child at the local school. However, when her new friend becomes obsessive to the point of stalking, she realises now is the time to finally stand up for herself. Cast: Gillian Kearney, Natasha Little and Rachel Leskovac
24	4	"Blood Ties"	Robert Glenister	Arthur Ellison	31 January 2013
A building instructor who is struggling to care for his elderly father finally breaks down after he accidentally mows down a young girl while answering a call to attend a fire at his father's home. When he later has an argument with a colleague, he realises that the consequences of the previous night's events could turn his world upside down. Cast: Paul McGann, Jack Shepherd, Jennifer Hennessy and Rob Jarvis
25	5	"That's Amore"	Johnny Vegas	Elliot Hope	1 February 2013
A married man struggles to comprehend his wrongdoing when his wife asks for a divorce, seemingly out of the blue. However, when the pair both end up with new dates, they realise that their decision to split may have been wrong after all. Cast: Jason Manford, Rebekah Staton, Jack Deam and Patrick McDonnell

=== Series 5 (2013) ===
No. overall	No. in series	Title	Directed by	Written by	Original release date
26	1	"Fledgling"	Noreen Kershaw	Shaun Duggan	11 November 2013
A policeman's wife decides to spice up her boring life by shoplifting, but soon finds herself on the run from the law. Unable to face up to her actions, she lies to her husband by claiming she was admitted to hospital. Cast: Natalie Gumede and Ray Fearon
27	2	"The House"	Gary Williams	Arthur Ellison	12 November 2013
A postman is excited when his father agrees to sign over his house to him, allowing him, his wife and his two children to move into the more suitable accommodation. However, when the man's estranged sister challenges the decision, she unleashes a shocking secret which leads the man to start the search for his biological father. Cast: Lee Ingleby, Jo Joyner, Duncan Preston and Keith Barron
28	3	"Value"	Noreen Kershaw	Anthony Gannie	13 November 2013
A newly qualified English teacher is driven barmy by her group of unruly students - so much so that her hair starts to fall out. When she decides to fake having cancer as a way of passing off her baldness, she begins to receive sympathy from pupils and staff alike. Cast: Dominique Jackson, Adam Fogerty, Ramon Tikaram and Anita Dobson
29	4	"Hush Little Baby"	Robert Glenister	Esther Wilson	14 November 2013
A young girl suddenly becomes mute after discovering her father is having an affair, leaving her family puzzled and concerned. When she comes face to face with her father's mistress, she discovers a newfound voice to tell her mother of his infidelity. Cast: Emma Cunniffe, Anthony Flanagan, Becky Hindley and Amy Nuttall
30	5	"Back By Six"	Johnny Vegas	Andy Lynch	15 November 2013
A cab driver suspects his ex-wife has found a new lover after informing him she is taking their children on holiday, but after his initial suspicions are quashed, the pair agree to work together for the sake of the children. Cast: Sharon Horgan, Paul Loughran and Craig Kelly

=== Series 6 (2014) ===
No. overall	No. in series	Title	Directed by	Written by	Original release date
31	1	"Madge"	Reece Dinsdale	Shaun Duggan	10 November 2014
An active pensioner is forced to lie to her new partner about visiting her ex-husband in jail, after misinforming her friends and family that he died in a car crash some years previously. But when her new beau pops the question, can she continue to keep up the façade? Cast: Hayley Mills, Peter Egan, Lucy Liemann and Kenneth Cranham
32	2	"The Signature"	David Whitney	Anthony Gannie	11 November 2014
A mother of two does an unholy deed when a customer comes into her shop with a winning lottery ticket. The customer is unaware of the windfall, and she decides to claim the ticket for herself. But is she able to face up to the consequences of her actions? Cast: Lisa Riley and Graeme Hawley
33	3	"Blind"	Julia Ford	Steven Fay	12 November 2014
A married housewife finds solace in an old friend, who is blind, after her marriage takes a turn for the worse. However, when he tries to persuade her to leave her husband, she realises that their marriage may be salvageable after all. Cast: Neil Fitzmaurice, Anna Crilly, Chris McCausland, Ciarán Griffiths and Dave Hill
34	4	"The Two Brothers"	Gary Williams	Collette Kane	13 November 2014
A down-on-his-luck man moves in with his brother after separating from his wife. When his brother gambles away a debt owed to him, he reports him to the police - which results in his brother losing his job. But can he own up to what he has done? Cast: Wil Johnson, Chucky Venn, Carla Henry, Leah Hackett and Liz May Brice
35	5	"The Beneficiary"	Gary Williams	Andy Lynch	14 November 2014
A woman is devastated when her married lover is killed in a car crash, but is forced to hide her pain from her own husband. However, when she is left £50,000 in the dead man's will, she is forced to reveal all about their illicit affair. Cast: Katy Carmichael, Dominic Carter, Mina Anwar and Brian Capron

=== Series 7 (2016) ===
No. overall	No. in series	Title	Directed by	Written by	Original release date
36	1	"Taxi for Linda"	Noreen Kershaw	Johanne McAndrew & Elliot Hope	22 February 2016
Switchboard operator Frank struggles to contain his feelings for co-worker Linda, but when ex-employee Terry rolls up and sweeps Linda off her feet, Frank's emotional persona changes, until he discovers Terry is having an affair. Cast: Julie Hesmondhalgh, Shane Richie and John Thomson
37	2	"Passengers"	Paul McGann	Nick Leather	23 February 2016
A widowed pensioner offers to help out his friendly neighbour by teaching her to drive, but when he believes she is being abused by her partner, he decides to call in Social Services to prevent any further torment. Cast: Eve Myles, Paul Copley and Joe McGann
38	3	"A Picture of Innocence"	Julia Ford	Shaun Duggan	24 February 2016
A woman discovers lewd photos of her teenage daughter have been posted on the internet, so she sets out to track down her less than subtle boyfriend and shame him publicly for subjecting his girlfriend to online humiliation. Cast: Emma Fryer, Kerry Godliman and Sean Chapman
39	4	"Love?"	David Whitney	Collette Kane	25 February 2016
A woman who has devoted her life to caring for her alcoholic father, whom everyone believes is dead, is forced to lie to her boyfriend when he proposes to her. But when he decides to leave town, will she open up about her double life? Cast: Samuel Anderson and Steve Evets
40	5	"Scratch"	Reece Dinsdale	Arthur Ellison	26 February 2016
A man decides to make a complaint against a group of noisy builders after his car is damaged, but sets in motion a chain of events that threatens to affect the entire neighbourhood and the residents in it. Cast: William Ash, Neil Bell, Rebecca Callard, Chris Coghill and Bill Fellowes

=== Series 8 (2016) ===
No. overall	No. in series	Title	Directed by	Written by	Original release date
41	1	"Eighteen"	Reece Dinsdale	Vivienne Harvey	7 November 2016
Mati Ahmadi is an Afghan immigrant who left Afghanistan when he was six. He lives in Manchester with his foster mother Rosie Maxwell and her son George, who has Down's syndrome. Mati receives a letter on his eighteenth birthday informing him that he is to be deported to his city of origin, Kabul. He goes on the run to avoid being sent back. Immigration officers look for Mati at the house, then George looks for Mati. After Mati finds George, he phones Rosie, who takes George home. Mati stays at her brother's flat. Rosie gets £2,000 from George's father, with which she pays a people smuggler to take him out of the country. Mati phones Rosie, telling her that he is in Berlin. Cast: Rosie Cavaliero, Antonio Aakeel and Chris Gascoyne
42	2	"Empty Nest"	Julia Ford	Colette Kane	8 November 2016
Working mother-of-two Clare is shocked when her 16-year-old son Matt tells her that he is going on holiday to France with his new girlfriend and her parents. To prevent him from going, she throws his passport in a skip that a neighbour hired and pretends it has been lost. She unsuccessfully tries to find the passport at the tip. She goes home and tell him what she has done. He is angry with her. He is issued a new passport and goes to France. Cast: Katy Cavanagh and Andrew Tiernan
43	3	"Zero"	Paul McGann	Shaun Duggan	10 November 2016
Nathan is 20, poor, and unhappy. He is working two part-time, low-paid, menial jobs - in a café and a restaurant. He recently moved back in with his father Les and Les's partner Dawn. Nathan has been in a relationship for over a year with Lucy, who lives with her parents. Nathan wants himself and Lucy to get a place of their own. He is delighted when he is accepted for a position making car seats at a car factory, Taylor Gibbon, and quits his part-time jobs. He wrongly assumes his new job is a regular full-time position. He soon discovers that it is a zero-hour contract. The hours and pay vary a lot, and he is sometimes called in at short notice. His boss Roy talks down to his staff and tells them that there is a high turnover of staff and that staff who do not work hard and have good attendance are sacked. A colleague is sacked for being ill, and Nathan is sacked for turning down a shift. Cast: Aron Julius, Charles Dale, Louis Emerick and Emma Lau Note: This episode was originally scheduled to be broadcast on Wednesday 9 November 2016, however it was postponed due to the coverage of the 2016 United States presidential election.
44	4	"Our House"	Noreen Kershaw	Esther Wilson	11 November 2016
A geriatric nurse who has recently purchased a run-down house with money that she inherited from her mother decides to hire in a builder recommended by one of her colleagues. He says that he will do the job much cheaper than any other builder, by using dishonest methods. He disappears with £2,500 of hers without doing the work, which makes her feel humiliated and foolish. She eventually finds him and confronts him, but he refuses to talk to her, do the work, or reimburse her. She hires a good, more expensive builder. Cast: Lorraine Cheshire, David Crellin and Andrew Dunn
45	5	"Burden"	David Whitney	Anthony Gannie	14 November 2016
Liam wants to go back to his wife Debra, 15-year-old daughter Jess, and younger sons Elliott and Luke. Debra kicked him out because he had sex with another woman. He has a new girlfriend, Anna, but would much rather go back to his family. He sees his sons regularly, but Jess resents him. He gives Jess a bottle of wine, which she later drinks on her own and becomes unconscious. She is taken to hospital. Liam admits to Debra that he gave Jess the wine. Debra is angry with him. He leaves Anna. Cast: Warren Brown, Amy Nuttall and Olivia Marie Fearn

=== Series 9 (2018) ===
No. overall	No. in series	Title	Directed by	Written by	Original release date
46	1	"Invisible"	Julia Ford	Jodhi May	5 February 2018
Rachel, a 45-year-old mother of two, is shocked to discover that the schoolteacher who sexually abused her 33 years previously is still teaching, and sets about trying to find why he chose to abuse her when she was 12. She confronts him and he denies it. His daughter then tells her to stay away from him. Rachel goes to the police station to report her former teacher. Cast: Jodhi May, Sinead Cusack and Simon Rouse
47	2	"Lost"	Reece Dinsdale	Shaun Duggan	6 February 2018
When a retired housewife's husband dies, she finds solace in a spiritualist church recommended by her sister. Her son, however, is concerned that she is being taken for a fool and sets about trying to prove it. He goes to the church to show that the 'medium's' claims are vague and in some cases false. Cast: Sue Johnston, Paula Wilcox and Dominic Power
48	3	"Two Fat Ladies"	Alex Jacob	Johanne McAndrew & Elliot Hope	7 February 2018
Two middle-aged women who are best friends have been going to bingo together for the past eleven years. They are suddenly torn apart when one of them wins £46,000 and refuses to split it down the middle with the other, as they have done with all of their previous (much smaller) wins. An offer of £6,000 is rejected and each woman's partner sides with her. Cast: Sally Lindsay, Sarah Niles and Shaun Williamson
49	4	"Neighbour"	David Whitney	Jill O'Halloran	8 February 2018
Formerly rich husband and wife Gary and Michelle struggle to adjust to life on the breadline after their business goes bust and they are forced to move to a poor area. However, they soon find help in the form of their friendly next-door neighbour, a waitress called Tina. Michelle takes a job waitressing with Tina and the two women become friends. Cast: Lorraine Burroughs, Jason Done and Charlie Brooks
50	5	"The Registrar"	Adrian Dunbar	Jimmy McGovern & Megan Ellison	9 February 2018
A middle-aged registrar finds little solace in bringing joy to others when her own marriage begins to crumble around her, when her husband leaves her for his mistress. However, she soon discovers there is light at the end of the tunnel when a colleague of hers proposes to her and they subsequently marry. Cast: Samantha Bond, Neil Morrissey and Richard Huw

=== Series 10 (2019) ===
No. overall	No. in series	Title	Directed by	Written by	Original release date
51	1	"By Any Other Name"	Tracey Larcombe	Emma Jowett	4 February 2019
Carl is a young single man who is a cleaner at a university and lives with his long-term best friend, Rob. Rob is happy with his life as a barman, but Carl is dissatisfied with his simple existence, his patronising boss Pauline, and his friendship with Rob. When a pretty student, Sarah, mistakenly assumes that Carl is a lecturer, Carl pretends that he is. He uses the name Leo Carlton and starts taking the classes of a lecturer who is absent due to having suffered an injury. Carl continues the deception because the role gives him self-esteem and because he and Sarah are attracted to each other. When Pauline sees him teaching a class, Sarah angrily walks out and rejects him for lying. Carl moves house and enrols as a student of classics. Cast: Ben Tavassoli, Dinita Gohil, Shobna Gulati and Adam Thomas
52	2	"Beaten"	Reece Dinsdale	Adam Simpson	5 February 2019
Shaun is an English teacher at a failing secondary school. He is unsuited to his job and stressed because one of his teenage pupils, Connor, has been causing him problems for years. Shaun is accepted in a position as a teacher at a grammar school, pending a reference from Paul, the headmaster of his current school. However, Paul refuses to give him the reference. Unable to cope with his current position, Shaun quits and decides never to work in a school again. Cast: Mark Stobbart, Niamh McGrady, Gary Cargill, Braydon Bent and Mila Dorian-Molyneux
53	3	"Isabelle"	Anya Camilleri	Andrew Lynch	6 February 2019
Karina is a poor single mother who lives with her nine-year-old daughter Isabelle and works in a chip shop. After Isabelle asks about her father, Greg, Karina contacts him. Greg meets Isabelle for the first time, and the child frequently visits him, his wife Chrissy, and her daughter Janey, who are well-off. Greg takes Karina to court to gain joint custody. He succeeds, but Karina and Isabelle move to Scotland. Cast: Lucy-Jo Hudson, Harry Hepple, Macy Shackleton and Melanie Kilburn
54	4	"A Walk in My Shoes"	Noreen Kershaw	Esther Wilson	7 February 2019
Carol used to be a homeless drug addict. She volunteers at a homeless shelter, where she is disliked by the staff, who talk down to her. She is offered a paid position there, but declines it and quits due to the hostility they show her. Cast: Rochenda Sandall, Ian Puleston-Davies, Faye McKeever, Tony Mooney and Paul Barber
55	5	"Frozen"	Jodhi May	David Chidlow	8 February 2019
Ali and Rafi are a married couple whose twins Leila and Sam were conceived through IVF. They have another embryo stored at the clinic. Rafi does not want any more children, but Ali does. She has the embryo implanted into her uterus without Rafi's knowledge. When she informs him of her pregnancy, he is angry and accuses her of having been impregnated by another man. Cast: Khalid Abdallah, Liz White, Jude Akuwudike, Martha Cope and Ruth Sheen

=== Series 11 (2020) ===
No. overall	No. in series	Title	Directed by	Written by	Original release date
56	1	"Time Out"	Ian Puleston-Davies	Dave Kirby	2 March 2020
Released on license for a crime he didn't commit, Joe’s budding romance with Lisa is put in jeopardy when he neglects to tell her he's been fitted with a prison tag. Cast: Tom McKay, Angel Coulby, Luca Johnson, Rod Arthur, Ged McKenna and Justin Moorhouse
57	2	"Second Sight"	Bob Pugh	Mandy Redvers Rowe	3 March 2020
A blind woman’s sight is restored through an operation, but she soon questions her decision when the visual world presents more problems than the one she has left behind. Cast: Kacey Ainsworth, Ian Kelsey, Grace Stotesbury, Claire Cage, Jeff Alexander and Simon Lowe
58	3	"Man of Steel"	Reece Dinsdale	Andrew Lynch	4 March 2020
A former rugby league legend is blackmailed by his ex-wife, who threatens to reveal a big secret if he doesn't come up with the money to help her jailbird boyfriend. Cast: Mark Addy, Jane Slavin, Paul Bazely, Marjorie Yates, David Crellin and William Travis
59	4	"Redundant"	Claire Tailyour	David Chidlow	5 March 2020
A middle-aged woman is forced to fight for her job and prove her role is vital. In doing so, she reaches her own surprising conclusion. Cast: Julie Graham, Manjinder Virk, Simone Saunders, Olivia Smith, David Kennedy and Sandra Huggett
60	5	"Home"	Gillian Kearney	Paul Womack	6 March 2020
A grieving mum befriends a young homeless man in an attempt to fill the void left by the sudden death of her son. Cast: Neve McIntosh, Will R. Smith, Alan McKenna, Mary Healey, Bill Blackwood and Debra Redcliffe

=== Series 12 (2021) ===
No. overall	No. in series	Title	Directed by	Written by	Original release date
61	1	"Wedding Day"	Len Gowing	David Chidlow	8 March 2021
A groom's wedding day is thrown into chaos when his father, thought long-dead, returns. Cast: Nico Mirallegro, Alex Carter, Marie Critchley, Mark Womack, Ciaran Clancy
62	2	"Secret Life"	Len Gowing	Lee Thompson	9 March 2021
After losing her father, a woman has to grapple with the revelation that he had another family. Cast: Tayo Aluko, Natasha Cottrial, Sally Bankes, Liam Powell-Berry, Howard Corlett, Ade Ajibade
63	3	"Get Fit or Try Lying"	Len Gowing	Adriel Leff	10 March 2021
A retiree finds a new lease of life when his daughter, for his 65th birthday, gifts him a fitness course. Cast: Les Dennis, Michael Starke, Jake Abraham, Elizabeth McClarnon, Keith Hollis, Louis Emerick, Aaron Cobham
64	4	"Hungry to Learn"	Gary Williams	Lisa McMullin	11 March 2021
A promising teenager’s education is jeopardised when she is made homeless. Cast: Louis Healy, Tillie Amartey, Phina Oruche, Jasmine Payne, Eleanor Cooke, Sarah White
65	5	"More Than Words"	Gary Williams	Charlie Swinbourne	12 March 2021
A woman losing her hearing tries to learn sign language, but her husband is resistant. Cast: Sophie Stone, Kelvin Fletcher, Adam Bassett, Nasreen Hussain, Alison Burrows, Joe Docherty, Caroline Parker, Adam Rea
