= Bob Clay =

British politician

Member of Parliament for Sunderland North
- In office 1983–1992
- Preceded by: Frederick Willey
- Succeeded by: William Etherington

Personal details
- Born: 2 October 1946 (age 78)
- Political party: Labour
- Education: Gonville and Caius College, Cambridge

Robert Alan Clay (born 2 October 1946), known as Bob Clay, is a left-wing politician and former Labour MP in the United Kingdom.

== Early life ==
Robert Clay was educated at Bedford School and Gonville and Caius College, Cambridge. Unusually for a man of his background, he went on to become a bus driver, working for Tyne and Wear PTE from 1975 to 1983. Clay first joined Labour as a teenager, but left to join the Trotskyist group International Socialists. He became a union shop steward in the 1980s and rejoined Labour.

== Parliamentary career ==
Clay was first elected to Parliament in 1983 for the Sunderland North constituency, replacing Labour MP Frederick Willey. During his time in parliament he was treasurer, and later secretary, of the Socialist Campaign Group of "hard-left" Labour MPs. He was re-elected in 1987, but stood down at the 1992 general election; Labour's William Etherington was elected in his place.

== Subsequent political activities ==
Clay opposed the 2003 Iraq War. He backed the left-wing party RESPECT The Unity Coalition in the 2004 European Elections. At the 2005 general election, he acted as agent for Reg Keys, who stood against the Prime Minister Tony Blair in Blair's Sedgefield constituency on an anti-war ticket. Keys' son Tom had been killed in action in Iraq. Although Clay was not an originator of Keys' campaign he used his position as agent to control all aspects of the campaign. He persuaded Derek Cattell, a former trade union officer and an executive member of Blair's Sedgefield Labour Party to join the campaign. Cattell's resignation from Labour during the election campaign, produced much publicity for the Keys campaign. Clay worked tirelessly for the Keys campaign helping build a coalition of support for Keys. Supporters included the former MP Martin Bell who in his book, The Truth that Sticks (2007) wrote "Of great value was Derek Cattell, formerly on the executive of Sedgefield Labour Party. He defected to Reg's campaign after some heart searching; it cost him some fair weather friends, but the candidate had no loyal supporter from start to finish." (page 103)

In 2015, the BBC announced that it was to produce a biographical drama film about Reg Keys' life called Reg. In the film, broadcast on 6 June 2016, Clay was portrayed by Ralph Brown and the script was by Jimmy McGovern and Robert Pugh.

Clay went on to live in the Marches city of Hereford, and remained politically active as a volunteer official in the local Labour Party. He involved himself in a number of local causes, including a group opposed to the building of a by-pass which would disturb ancient archaeological remains known as The Dinedor Serpent. He now lives in the Llansamlet ward of Swansea East, where, on 4 July 2013, he was elected in a by-election, as a Labour Party councillor for the City and County of Swansea Council. His wife, Uta Clay, served as a councillor for the same council, but both stood down at the 2017 election.

Parliament of the United Kingdom
Preceded by Fred Willey	Member of Parliament for Sunderland North; 1983–1992	Succeeded by Bill Etherington
