= Dark Dark Dark =

Minneapolis-based folk rock band

- Origin: Minneapolis, Minnesota, United States
- Genres: Indie pop, folk pop, Americana, New Orleans jazz
- Years active: 2006–present
- Labels: Supply & Demand Music
- Members: Nona Marie Invie; Marshall LaCount; Todd Chandler; Jonathan Kaiser; Walt McClements; Brett Bullion; Adam Wozniak; Mark Trecka
- Website: www.brightbrightbright.com

Dark Dark Dark is an American folk band from Minneapolis, Minnesota. To date, they have released three albums: The Snow Magic (2008), Wild Go (2010), and Who Needs Who (2012). They have toured extensively in the United States and Eastern Asia and are known for their blend of New Orleans jazz, Americana, Eastern European folk and pop.

== History ==
Dark Dark Dark formed as a quartet and began touring in 2006. In 2008, they released their debut album The Snow Magic on Supply & Demand Music, which PopMatters called "a strong debut". This was followed by an EP of Snow Magic remixes from Anticon artists Odd Nosdam and Dosh in October 2009, which coincided with a US tour opening for Why? and AU. In March 2010 they released their EP Bright Bright Bright, followed by their full-length album Wild Go in October 2010, both to critical acclaim.

Pitchfork writes of the full length, "...perhaps Dark Dark Dark's true accomplishment here is how they mix sounds and influences so effortlessly. They comprise a tight, intuitive unit, especially when the instruments swirl together into an otherworldly eddy of sound". NPR notes how "Invie sings with a flexible, penetrating voice, shedding both light and shadow on the meaning of her lyrics" and Paste Magazine describes the "...noteworthy balance that's struck between beauty, familiarity, and surrealistic imagery...".

The single "Daydreaming" from Wild Go was featured in Episode 7, Season 7 of Grey's Anatomy, in Episode 18, Season 1 of Switched at Birth and in Episode 5, Season 1 of Good Girls. "Daydreaming" was also used as background music in the February 11, 2011 episode of American Idol and in the Degrassi: The Next Generation episode, "Jesus, Etc., Part 2". The song 'Wild Goose Chase' made an appearance in Episode 1, Series 6 of Skins in the UK. "In Your Dreams", also from Wild Go, is used as the theme for the BBC drama Thirteen.

The band has also participated in the performance-art project "Swimming Cities of the Switchback Sea", orchestrated by street artist Swoon. This performance piece involved floating rafts made of junk down the Hudson River from Troy to Long Island City, Queens. The band not only performed music for the piece, but also helped to build the rafts. In addition, the band acted in and scored bass player Todd Chandler's film Flood Tide, which is a fictionalized narrative based on the "Switchback Sea" project. In May and June 2009, the project ventured to the Adriatic sea where it traveled from Slovenia to Venice for the Venice Biennale.

In 2008, the band participated in site-specific installations at art museums. At the Massachusetts Museum of Contemporary Art (MASS MoCA), they performed a piece entitled "Being Here is Better than Wishing We'd Stayed," after the song "New York Song" on The Snow Magic. In the Netherlands, for the Van Abbemuseum's Heartland Exhibition, they helped build an interactive installation constructed from salvaged materials. They also performed a free outdoor concert at the museum.

== Discography ==
Albums

- The Snow Magic – 2008 (Supply & Demand Music)
- Wild Go – 2010 (Supply & Demand Music)
- Who Needs Who – 2012 (Supply & Demand Music)

EPs

- Love You, Bye – 2008 (What a Mess! Records/Blood Onion Record)
- Remixes – 2009 (Supply & Demand Music)
- Bright Bright Bright – 2010 (Supply & Demand Music)
- What I Needed – 2013
- Something Was There - 2023

== Members ==
Current

- Nona Marie Invie – vocals, piano, accordion (2006–present)
- Marshall LaCount – banjo, clarinet, vocals (2006–present)
- Walt McClements – piano, accordion, trumpet, backing vocals (2009–present)
- Mark Trecka – touring drummer (2009–2010) drums (2010–present)
- Adam Wozniak – bass (2011–present)

Former

- Todd Chandler – upright bass, backing vocals (2006–2010)
- Jonathan Kaiser – cello, guitar, backing vocals (2006–2010)
- Brett Bullion – drums, percussion (2009–2010)
