= Katherine Rose Morley =

English actress

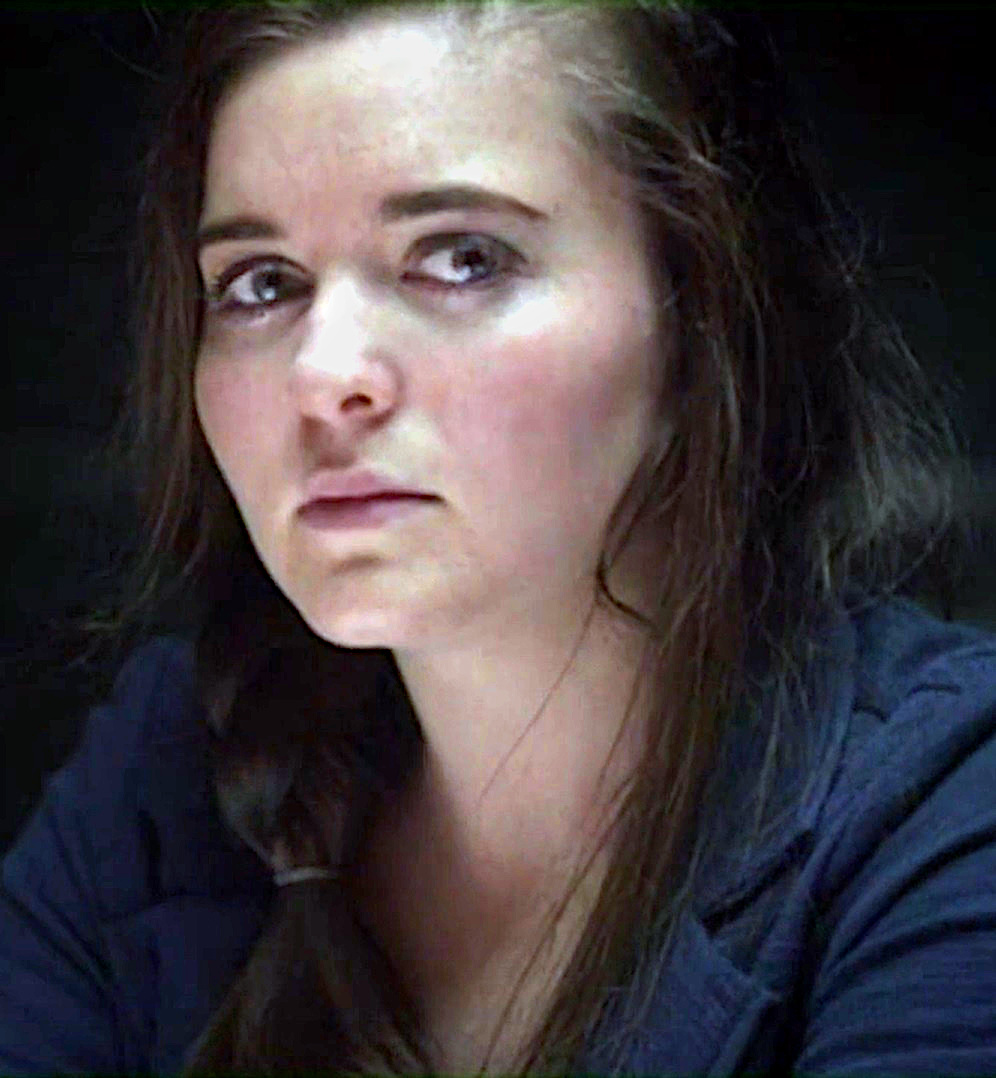
- Morley in Vera 2015
- Born: 3 October 1989 (age 36); Liverpool, England
- Occupation: Actress
- Years active: 2012–present
- Spouse: Oliver Coopersmith (m. 2022)
- Children: 1

Katherine Rose Morley (born 3 October 1989) is an English actress. She is best known for her television roles in The Mill (2013–2014), Vera (2015), Thirteen (2016), Last Tango in Halifax (2013–2020), Clink (2019), The Syndicate (2021), and the Black Mirror episode "Demon 79" (2023).

== Early life ==
Katherine Rose Morley was born in the Woolton suburb of Liverpool on 3 October 1989. Her acting debut came at age 12 in a production of The Lion, the Witch and the Wardrobe at St Julie's Catholic High School in Woolton. Between the ages of 13 and 19, she spent time with Liverpool's Everyman and Playhouse Youth Theatre, taking part in the company's Everyword Festival. She later attended the Guildhall School of Music and Drama, where she won the institute's Gold Medal for Drama, a prestigious award given to one performer each year. She graduated with a BA in 2012. She also studied at the Central Academy of Drama in Beijing and the Prima del Teatro in Pisa.

== Career ==
Morley first appeared on television in 2012 in an episode of the comedy series Little Crackers. In 2013, she starred as Lucy Garner in the drama series The Mill. In 2015, she made appearances in episodes of the drama series Vera and Cuffs. Also in 2015, she appeared in the short films Break alongside John Hurt and The Caravan with Shirley Henderson.

In 2016, Morley starred in episodes of the drama series Moving On and Call the Midwife. She also starred as Emma Moxam, sister of protagonist Ixy Moxam, in the drama miniseries Thirteen. Ivy was played by Jodie Comer, who had previously been a few years below Morley at St Julie's Catholic High School in Liverpool. She also had a regular role as Ellie in the drama series Last Tango in Halifax from 2013 to 2020. In 2021, she appeared in series 4 of the BBC comedy drama The Syndicate.

In 2023, Morley starred as Vicky in the Black Mirror episode "Demon 79", which won a BAFTA Television Craft Award.

== Personal life ==
Morley married actor Oliver Coopersmith in December 2022. Their son was born in 2023.

== Filmography ==
=== Film ===
Year	Title	Role	Notes
2015	Break	Martha	Short film
2015	Gas	Woman	Short film
2015	The Caravan	Shelly	Short film

=== Television ===
Year	Title	Role	Notes
2012	Little Crackers	Young Sharon	1 episode
2013	Love Matters	Call Centre Girl	1 episode
2013–2014	The Mill	Lucy Garner	9 episodes
2013–2020	Last Tango in Halifax	Ellie	17 episodes
2015	Cuffs	PCSO Jenny Russell	1 episode
2015	Comedy Feeds	Hattie	Episode: "Wild Phase"
2015	Vera	Claire Viner	episode - "Changing Tides"
2016	Thirteen	Emma Moxam	5 episodes
2016	Moving On	Angela	1 episode
2016	Call the Midwife	Stella Beckett	1 episode
2019	Clink	Chloe Anderson	10 episodes
2021	The Syndicate	Keeley Sanderson	6 episodes
2023	Black Mirror	Vicky	Episode: "Demon 79"

== Awards and nominations ==
Year	Award	Category	Work	Result
2012	Guildhall School of Music and Drama Gold Award	Most Exceptional Performer	Graduate Student of 2012	Won
