= Sunderland North =

Parliamentary constituency in the United Kingdom, 1950–2010

Coordinates: 54.921°N 1.374°W

- Former borough constituency for the House of Commons
- Boundary of Sunderland North in Tyne and Wear for the 2005 general election

- Location of Tyne and Wear within England
- County: Tyne and Wear
- Major settlements: Sunderland

1950–2010
- Seats: One
- Created from: Sunderland
- Replaced by: Sunderland Central, Washington and Sunderland West

Sunderland North was a borough constituency represented in the House of Commons of the Parliament of the United Kingdom from 1950 to 2010. It elected one Member of Parliament (MP) by the first past the post system of election.

== History ==
Sunderland North, as can be inferred from the name, formed the northern part of the County Borough (now City) of Sunderland. The constituency was created by the Representation of the People Act 1948 for the 1950 general election when the existing two-member Sunderland seat was split into two. Fulwell was transferred from Houghton-le-Spring.

It was abolished for the 2010 general election when it was replaced by the new constituency of Sunderland Central, with the exception of the two western wards of Castle and Redhill, which were transferred to the new constituency of Washington and Sunderland West.

It was considered to be a safe seat for the Labour Party throughout its existence.

== Boundaries ==
=== 1950–1974 ===
- The County Borough of Sunderland wards of Bridge, Central, Colliery, Deptford, Fulwell, Monkwearmouth, Monkwearmouth Shore, Roker, and Southwick.

=== 1974–1983 ===
- The County Borough of Sunderland wards of Castletown, Central, Colliery, Deptford, Downhill, Ford, Fulwell, Hylton Castle, Monkwearmouth, Pallion, Roker, and Southwick.

Boundaries expanded in line with those of the County Borough, including the gain of Hylton from Houghton-le-Spring. Existing boundary with Sunderland South realigned, including the gain of Pallion ward.

=== 1983–1997 ===
- The Metropolitan Borough of Sunderland wards of Castletown, Central, Colliery, Fulwell, Pallion, St Peter's, South Hylton, Southwick, and Town End Farm.

Minor changes to take account of new ward boundaries.

=== 1997–2010 ===
- The City of Sunderland wards of Castletown, Central, Colliery, Fulwell, Pallion, St Peter's, Southwick, and Town End Farm.

South Hylton ward transferred to Sunderland South.

== Members of Parliament ==
Election	Member	Party
1950	Fred Willey	Labour
1983	Bob Clay	Labour
1992	Bill Etherington	Labour
2010	Constituency abolished: see Sunderland Central	

== Elections ==
=== Elections in the 1950s ===
General election 1950: Sunderland North
Party	Candidate	Votes	%	±%
Labour	Fred Willey	24,816	54.1	
Conservative	S. Hudson	17,469	38.1	
Liberal	James Louis Hurst	3,614	7.9	
Majority		7,347	16.0	
Turnout		45,899	84.4	
Labour win (new seat)				

General election 1951: Sunderland North
Party	Candidate	Votes	%	±%
Labour	Fred Willey	23,792	54.0	−0.1
Conservative	Ronald Kendall	20,302	46.0	+7.9
Majority		3,490	8.0	−8.0
Turnout		44,094	72.3	−12.1
Labour hold		Swing	−4.0	

General election 1955: Sunderland North
Party	Candidate	Votes	%	±%
Labour	Fred Willey	24,237	53.1	−0.9
Conservative	Auberon M. Herbert	21,401	46.9	+0.9
Majority		2,836	6.2	−1.8
Turnout		45,638	75.7	+3.4
Labour hold		Swing	−0.9	

General election 1959: Sunderland North
Party	Candidate	Votes	%	±%
Labour	Fred Willey	24,341	52.4	−0.7
Conservative	Philip E. Heselton	22,133	47.6	+0.7
Majority		2,208	4.8	−1.4
Turnout		46,474	80.5	+4.8
Labour hold		Swing	−0.7	

=== Elections in the 1960s ===
General election 1964: Sunderland North
Party	Candidate	Votes	%	±%
Labour	Fred Willey	23,826	55.8	+3.4
Conservative	Philip Edwin Heselton	17,696	41.5	−6.1
Ind. Conservative	Robert C. Middelwood	1,157	2.7	New
Majority		6,130	14.3	+9.5
Turnout		42,679	75.1	−5.4
Labour hold		Swing	+4.8	

General election 1966: Sunderland North
Party	Candidate	Votes	%	±%
Labour	Fred Willey	25,438	60.8	+5.0
Conservative	Peter Rost	16,423	39.2	−2.3
Majority		9,015	21.6	+7.3
Turnout		41,861	74.5	−0.6
Labour hold		Swing	+3.7	

=== Elections in the 1970s ===
General election 1970: Sunderland North
Party	Candidate	Votes	%	±%
Labour	Fred Willey	25,779	60.6	−0.2
Conservative	John M. Reay-Smith	16,738	39.4	+0.2
Majority		9,041	21.2	−0.4
Turnout		42,517	69.7	−4.8
Labour hold		Swing	−0.2	

General election February 1974: Sunderland North
Party	Candidate	Votes	%	±%
Labour	Fred Willey	28,933	52.2	−8.4
Conservative	John David Stuart Brown	17,533	31.6	−7.8
Liberal	John Anthony Lennox	9,015	16.3	New
Majority		11,400	20.6	−0.6
Turnout		55,481	74.0	+4.3
Labour hold		Swing		

General election October 1974: Sunderland North
Party	Candidate	Votes	%	±%
Labour	Fred Willey	29,618	58.5	+6.3
Conservative	John David Stuart Brown	13,497	27.5	−4.1
Liberal	John Anthony Lennox	7,077	14.0	−2.3
Majority		15,671	31.0	+10.4
Turnout		50,642	67.0	−7.0
Labour hold		Swing	+5.2	

General election 1979: Sunderland North
Party	Candidate	Votes	%	±%
Labour	Fred Willey	29,213	57.7	−0.8
Conservative	Lindsay James Keith	16,311	32.1	+4.6
Liberal	John Anthony Lennox	5,238	10.3	−3.7
Majority		12,902	25.6	−5.4
Turnout		50,762	69.5	+2.5
Labour hold		Swing	−2.9	

=== Elections in the 1980s ===
General election 1983: Sunderland North
Party	Candidate	Votes	%	±%
Labour	Bob Clay	24,179	46.3	−11.4
Conservative	Christopher Lewis	16,983	32.5	+0.4
Liberal	Douglas McCourt	11,090	21.2	+10.9
Majority		7,196	13.8	−11.8
Turnout		52,292	66.5	−3.0
Labour hold		Swing		

General election 1987: Sunderland North
Party	Candidate	Votes	%	±%
Labour	Bob Clay	29,767	55.8	+9.5
Conservative	Iain Pickton	15,095	28.3	−4.2
Liberal	Terence Jenkinson	8,518	15.9	−5.3
Majority		14,672	27.5	+13.7
Turnout		53,380	70.5	+4.0
Labour hold		Swing	+6.9	

=== Elections in the 1990s ===
General election 1992: Sunderland North
Party	Candidate	Votes	%	±%
Labour	Bill Etherington	30,481	60.7	+4.9
Conservative	Judith Barnes	13,477	26.9	−1.4
Liberal Democrats	Vic Halom	5,389	10.7	−5.2
Liberal	Winifred Lundgren	841	1.7	−14.2
Majority		17,004	33.9	+6.4
Turnout		50,188	68.9	−1.6
Labour hold		Swing	+3.2	

General election 1997: Sunderland North
Party	Candidate	Votes	%	±%
Labour	Bill Etherington	26,067	68.2	+8.6
Conservative	Andrew Selous	6,370	16.7	−11.1
Liberal Democrats	Geoffrey Pryke	3,973	10.4	−0.6
Referendum	Mark Nicholson	1,394	3.6	New
Monster Raving Loony	Kenneth Newby	409	1.1	New
Majority		19,697	51.5	+17.6
Turnout		38,213	59.1	−9.8
Labour hold		Swing		

=== Elections in the 2000s ===
General election 2001: Sunderland North
Party	Candidate	Votes	%	±%
Labour	Bill Etherington	18,685	62.7	−5.5
Conservative	Michael Harris	5,331	17.9	+1.2
Liberal Democrats	John Lennox	3,599	12.1	+1.7
Independent	Neil Herron	1,518	5.1	New
BNP	David Guynan	687	2.3	New
Majority		13,354	44.8	−6.7
Turnout		29,820	49.0	−10.1
Labour hold		Swing		

General election 2005: Sunderland North
Party	Candidate	Votes	%	±%
Labour	Bill Etherington	15,719	54.4	−8.3
Conservative	Stephen Daughton	5,724	19.8	+1.9
Liberal Democrats	James Hollern	4,277	14.8	+2.7
Independent	Neil Herron	2,057	7.1	+2.0
BNP	Debra Hiles	1,136	3.9	+1.6
Majority		9,995	34.6	−10.2
Turnout		28,913	49.7	+0.7
Labour hold		Swing	−5.1	

== See also ==
- History of parliamentary constituencies and boundaries in Tyne and Wear
- History of parliamentary constituencies and boundaries in Durham
