= Granite Harbour (TV series) =

British television drama

- Genre: Police procedural
- Written by: Sarah Deane; Robert Fraser; Jillian Mannion; Ciara Conway
- Starring: Romario Simpson; Hannah Donaldson; Dawn Steele; Bhav Joshi; Michelle Jeram
- Composers: Matthew Hall; Stephen Vedmore
- Country of origin: United Kingdom
- Original language: English
- No. of seasons: 3
- No. of episodes: 9

Production
- Executive producer: Colin McKeown
- Producer: Donna Molloy
- Production locations: Aberdeen, Scotland
- Cinematography: Caroline Bridges
- Editor: Alex Beards
- Running time: 60 minutes
- Production company: LA Productions

Original release
- Network: BBC Scotland; BBC One
- Release: 1 December 2022 – present

Granite Harbour is a British police procedural television drama series set in Aberdeen, Scotland. It is based on an idea by Adriel Leff & Kul Muhay. The series was first broadcast on BBC Scotland on 1 December 2022, followed by BBC One.

A second series was broadcast in May 2024.

The BBC announced the return of Granite Harbour for a third series on 25 March 2025. Principal photography started in September of that year, with episodes released from 23 July 2026.

== Plot ==
Former sergeant in the Royal Military Police, now detective Davis Lindo, and his partner DS Lara Bartlett must solve the murder of an oil tycoon in Aberdeen.

== Cast and characters ==
- Romario Simpson as DC Davis Lindo
- Hannah Donaldson as DS Lara "Bart" Bartlett
- Dawn Steele as DCI Cora MacMillan
- Bhav Joshi as DI Jaiyush Mallick (Series 1 & 2)
- Michelle Jeram as DS Simone "Monty" Montrose
- Katia Winter as Karolina Andersson (Series 1)
- Gary Lewis as Shay Coburn (Series 1)
- Hiftu Quasem as Sandy Hepburn (Series 1)
- Caroline Deyga as Hannah Coutts (Series 1)
- Andrew Still as Rory Dashford (Series 1)
- Patrick Robinson as Grantley Lindo (Series 2)
- Lesley Hart as Grace McFadden (Series 2)
- Søren Malling as Captain Nielsen (Series 2)
- Kate Bracken as Katie Forsyth (Series 2)
- Sani Mamood as Nazir Mallick (Series 2)
- Alex Høgh Andersen as Emil Veggem (Series 2)
- Christopher Rygh as Axel Berg (Series 2)
- Afsaneh Dehrouyeh as Mariam Faraki (Series 2)
- John Gordon Sinclair as Chief Constable Graeme Willis (Series 3)
- Amelia Isaac Jones as Harper Ross (Series 3)
- Alastair Mackenzie as Richard Loughty (Series 3)
- Ellie Haddington as Rose Gough (Series 3)
- Thoren Ferguson as Alex Nichols (Series 3)
- Emma Hartley-Miller as Shelley Crockford (Series 3)
- Ryan Fletcher as Carl Hadwood (Series 3)
- Dawn Sievewright as Drina Gough (Series 3)
- Joshua Haynes as Jackson McIlroy (Series 3)

== Production ==
Co-creator of Granite Harbour Kul Muhay, a former police officer from Derby said that he wanted to create a more realistic and accurate police procedural when compared with others he had watched. In August 2023, the show was renewed for a second series which aired May 2024.

The musical score for the first series was produced by a teenager.

The first and second series were produced by LA Productions.

== Episodes ==
=== Series 1 (2022) ===
No.	Title	Directed by	Written by	BBC Scotland	BBC One	U.K. viewers (millions)
1	"Episode 1"	Gary Williams	Sarah Deane & Adriel Leff; Story by : Sarah Deane	1 December 2022	2 December 2022	3.67
2	"Episode 2"	Gary Williams	Sarah Deane & Tara Hepburn; Story by : Sarah Deane	8 December 2022	7 December 2022	N/A
3	"Episode 3"	Gary Williams	Sarah Deane; Story by : Sarah Deane	15 December 2022	16 December 2022	N/A

=== Series 2 (2024) ===
No.	Title	Directed by	Written by	BBC Scotland	BBC One	U.K. viewers (millions)
1	"Episode 1"	Martin Smith and Alex Browning	Robert Fraser	2 May 2024	3 May 2024	2.31
2	"Episode 2"	Martin Smith and Alex Browning	Jillian Mannion	9 May 2024	10 May 2024	N/A
3	"Episode 3"	Martin Smith and Alex Browning	Ciara Conway	16 May 2024	17 May 2024	N/A

=== Series 3 (2026) ===
No.	Title	Directed by	Written by	Original release date	U.K. viewers (millions)
1	"Episode 1"	Martin Smith	Robert Fraser	23 July 2026	2.24
2	"Episode 2"	Martin Smith	Jillian Mannion	30 July 2026	N/A
3	"Episode 3"	Martin Smith	Ciara Conway	6 August 2026	N/A

== Reception ==
Stuart Jeffries of The Guardian gave the first episode of the first series three out of five stars, where he criticises the writing, calling several character actions "cliched". Jeffries also describes the main characters as "dressiest crime solvers in all of Police Scotland's history" who he couldn't imagine "getting into a dumpster to hunt for clues".
