= Jane Hazlegrove =

English actress

- Born: Sarah Jane Hazlegrove; 17 July 1968 (age 57); Manchester, Lancashire, England
- Occupation: Actress
- Years active: 1984–present
- Spouse: Isobel Middleton (m. 2015)

Sarah Jane Hazlegrove (born 17 July 1968) is an English actress, known for playing Kathleen "Dixie" Dixon in the BBC medical drama Casualty. She has also appeared as Rosie in Making Out, Rosemary Mason in Silent Witness, Yvonne Bradley in London's Burning, and roles in Jonathan Creek, The Bill, Doctors, Families, Lovejoy, Coronation Street, and Holby City.

A lesbian whose character in Casualty is also gay, Hazlegrove was listed as one of the 100 most influential LGBT people of the year in 2012's World Pride Power List. Hazlegrove is married to actress Isobel Middleton.

On 30 January 2016, Hazlegrove left Casualty after playing the role of Dixie for 10 years. She reprised the role of Dixie in a guest appearance as a Hems paramedic on 7 September 2019.

She appeared at the Royal Exchange, Manchester in Queens of the Coal Age, written by Maxine Peake. On 1 May 2019, it was announced that Hazlegrove had joined the cast of Coronation Street as Bernie Winter, the mother of established characters Gemma Winter and Paul Foreman.

In 2019, Hazlegrove also played PO Janine Dolan in the 5Star prison drama Clink.

== Filmography ==
=== Film ===
Year	Title	Role	Notes
1990	Shooting Stars	Alison	
2003	Cheeky	Fanny	

=== Television ===
Year	Title	Role	Notes
1984	Threads	Alison Kemp	TV film
1984	How We Used to Live	Maggie Selby	Recurring role (4 episodes)
1985	Summer Season		Episode: "Picture Friend"
1985	Coronation Street	Sue Clayton	Main role (27 episodes)
1985	Albion Market	Debbie Taylor	Soap opera
1985	Travelling Man		Episode: "Hustler"
1987	How We Used to Live	Dorothy Clegg	Episode: "1954: Land of Plenty"
1987	First Sight	Janice	Episode: "Who's Our Little Jenny Lind?"
1988	Screen Two	Michelle	Episode: "Love Birds"
1989–1991	Making Out	Rosie	Recurring role (11 episodes)
1990	Families	Lisa Shepherd	Episode 1.1
1990–1991	Waterfront Beat	WPC Madeline Forrest	Main role (12 episodes)
1992	A Touch of Frost	Maureen Shelby	Episode: "Conclusions"
1992	Heartbeat	Maggie	Episode: "Playing with Fire"
1993	Lovejoy	Yvonne	Episode: "Dainty Dish"
1993	Just a Gigolo	Sandy	Episode 1.7
1993	Heidi	Dete	TV film
1994	The Whipping Boy	Mrs. Chestney	TV film
1995	Heartbeat	Marion	Episode: "Toss Up"
1995	The Bill	Lisa Powell	Episode: "Hard Cases"
1996	Band of Gold	DC Turner	Episode: "Hurt"
1996	Casualty	Jane Macguire	Episode “Trapped”
1997	The Bill	Nicola Cooper	Episode: "Rolling in It"
1997	Jonathan Creek	Katrina Toplis	Episode: "The Wrestler's Tomb"
1998	The Grand	Minnie Hobson	Episode 2.9
1998	London's Burning	Yvonne	Recurring role (11 episodes)
1998	Dinnerladies	Lisa	Episode: "Monday"
1998	The Ruth Rendell Mysteries	Rosamund	Episode: "You Can't Be Too Careful"
2000	Without Motive	WPC Margaret Walkinshaw	TV series
2000	Hero to Zero	Miss Horsborough	TV series
2000	Where the Heart Is	Zoe Price	Episode: "Getting Better"
2001	People Like Us		Episode: "The Mother"
2002	Silent Witness	Rosemary Mason	Recurring role (6 episodes)
2003	Buried	DD Burridge	Main role (8 episodes)
2003	Holby City	Anne Fryer	Episode: "Never Can Say Goodbye"
2004	The Inspector Lynley Mysteries	Janice Cooke	Episode: "If Wishes Were Horses"
2004	Heartbeat	Diane Critchard	Recurring role (4 episodes)
2005	Judge John Deed	Margaret Tredaway	Episodes: "Lost and Found", "Above the Law", "In Defence of Others"
2005	Dalziel and Pascoe	Kay Simms	Episodes: "The Dig: Parts 1 & 2"
2005	The Bill	Trina	Episode: "289a"
2005	Faith	Paula	TV film
2006	Doctors	Sara Faulkner	Episode: "Daddy Cool"
2006	Casualty	Angela Regis	Episode: "The Things We Do for Love"
2006	Holby City	Kathleen 'Dixie' Dixon	Episode: "The Unforgiven"
2006–2016, 2019	Casualty	Kathleen 'Dixie' Dixon	Main role (401 episodes)
2012	Casualty: The Kids Aren't Alright	Kathleen 'Dixie' Dixon	Red button special
2015	Holby City	Kathleen 'Dixie' Dixon	Episode: "Homecoming"
2018	Father Brown	Hermione Harvey	Episode: "The Flower of the Fairway"
2018	Flowers	Sylvia	
2019	Clink	Janine Dolan	Supporting role
2019–present	Coronation Street	Bernie Winter	Series regular
