= Reg (film) =

2016 television film

- Written by: Jimmy McGovern; Robert Pugh
- Directed by: David Blair
- Starring: Tim Roth; Allan Gildea; Gerard Crossan
- Music by: Ed Shearmur
- Country of origin: England
- Original language: English

Production
- Producers: Colin McKeown; Donna Molloy
- Cinematography: Ed Rutherford
- Editor: Patrick Hall
- Running time: 90 minutes
- Production company: LA Productions

Original release
- Release: 6 June 2016

Reg is a one-off BBC Television fact-based drama about the campaign by Reg Keys to obtain answers following the death of his son Tom in the Iraq War, by standing in the 2005 general election as an anti-war independent candidate in Sedgefield, a constituency held by the then Prime Minister, Tony Blair.

== Production ==
Keys was portrayed by Academy Award-nominated actor Tim Roth and the programme was scripted by Jimmy McGovern. Talking on BBC radio programme Front Row in June 2016 about creating the drama, McGovern said: "I first thought about it over eight years ago and I went down to see Reg and I tried to start it, but for some reason I just couldn't seem to start it. But it was always at the back of my mind: 'I know I've got to tell this man's story'". Of his main protagonist, McGovern has said "It was an honour to meet Reg Keys. He is a truly remarkable man, and it has been a privilege to tell this part of his story."

== Cast ==
The cast of Reg included:

- Tim Roth as Reg Keys
- Anna Maxwell Martin as Sally Keys
- Elliott Tittensor as Richard Keys
- Ralph Brown as Bob Clay
- Zac Fox as Tom Keys
- Charlie Anson as Major Bryn Parry Jones
- David Westhead as Tony Blair's minder
- David Yelland as Martin Bell
- Tim Bentinck as Frederick Forsyth
- Kevin Doyle as Returning Officer

The Male Voice Choir featured in the choir rehearsal scene and in the funeral scene were Cor Meibion Y Fflint / Flint Male Voice Choir

== Awards and nominations ==
Year	Organization	Category	Nominee(s)	Result	Ref.
2017	45th International Emmy Awards	Best TV Movie/miniseries	—N/a	Nominated	

== Critical reception ==
In The Daily Telegraph Jasper Rees found Reg to be "a meticulous autopsy of a vast insult to the British body politic", noting "McGovern knows where to find the drama in stories of private grief battling institutional indifference" and adding "This was a quiet portrait of simmering rage, sometimes a bit too quiet. […] The Keys' Brummie [sic] stoicism was the cause of much understated acting – Roth was doggedly undemonstrative, Maxwell Martin temperate and reserved."

Writing in The Guardian, Lucy Mangan began by saying "I don't know where Jimmy McGovern gets the emotional energy or resilience from, I really don't" before judging that "There wasn't a weak moment in the film". Mangan found Anna Maxwell Martin "as quietly stellar as always" and that "Roth was extraordinary as a man scoured out by grief and left with only a single purpose to pursue. Implacable, purged of all need or desire for lesser considerations or emotions by his loss, he gave us a man and a performance boiled down to its very essence. There is nothing more honestly, nakedly powerful or moving. Thank you."
