= Battle of Majar al-Kabir =

Conflict engagement in Iraq, 2003

- Part of Iraq War
Date	24 June 2003
Location	Majar al-Kabir, Maysan Province, Iraq 31°35′N 47°10′E

Belligerents
United Kingdom	Local people

Strength
British Army: 1st Battalion, Parachute Regiment; 156 Provost Company (Royal Military Police)	400–600 (estimated)

Casualties and losses
6 killed, 8 wounded	4 killed, 11 wounded
- Location within Iraq

The Battle of Majar al-Kabir was the result of growing distrust between the British military and local inhabitants of south-eastern Iraq over house searches and confiscation of personal weapons that locals felt were crucial for their self-protection. Despite a signed agreement between local people and British forces stating that the British would not enter the town, the 1st Battalion, Parachute Regiment started patrolling in the town of Majar al-Kabir on 24 June 2003, the day after the agreement was signed. The British thought the agreement was to stop the weapons searches that involved going into the houses of local inhabitants.

At first, angry locals stoned the Paras, encouraged by anti-British rhetoric broadcast from the town's minarets. The Paras used rubber bullets to try to control the situation; this led to street battles, rifle fire and the cornering of six Royal Military Policemen (RMP) in the police station at Majar al-Kabir. There were conflicting reports about who had fired the first live shots. The six RMP were killed by an angry mob of up to 600 people while maintaining a defensive position within the police station. Four Iraqi civilians were killed and at least eleven more were injured during the riot. Eight British troops were injured, although only one casualty was the result of a firefight in the town.

A Quick Reaction Force (QRF) was deployed from Camp Abu Naji and air support came in the form of one Gazelle and one Chinook helicopter. The Chinook incurred enough airframe damage from Iraqi gunfire that it could not land its QRF element in the town and had to return to Abu Naji where it offloaded seriously injured troops.

The death of the six RMP was one of the most controversial occurrences of the Iraq Campaign involving British forces and remains a topic of debate in political and military circles.

== Background ==
Occupation zones in Iraq in September 2003

On 20 March 2003, coalition forces started the invasion of Iraq that would become the Iraq War, lasting until 18 December 2011. Combat operations were announced by the then-President of the United States, George W. Bush, as being over on 1 May 2003. The south-eastern region of Iraq became part of the United Kingdom's Multi-National Division (South East) (MND (SE)) under the framework of Operation Telic. As part of their remit, the British forces were keen to remove all heavy weaponry from the region (anti-tank weapons, RPGs etc) and did so purposely. Whilst most of the weapons and ammunition were removed from private houses in the region, smaller weapons, such as AK-47s and handguns, were left with the families for their own protection. The local Iraqis had argued this point and demanded that they be left with some protection in what was a dangerous area post-invasion. One local man was quoted as saying "If Saddam Hussein could not take away our weapons, why should we allow the British to do so?"

The town of Majar al-Kabir lies 250 miles (400 km) south east of Baghdad and 120 miles (190 km) north of Basra in the Maysan Province of Iraq, and at the time, had a population of 85,000. In 2003, the main British base covering the region was Camp Abu Naji, which was 4 miles (6.4 km) south of Amarah and 15 miles (24 km) north of Majar al-Kabir. Majar al-Kabir was known to be awash with weapons as the area was predominantly Shia Muslim, whose people had been brutally treated by the government of Saddam Hussein. When the British arrived, they found an area devoid of government officials as all the Ba'athists had been chased away by the resentful local populace. The region was also prone to other influences such as the CIA operating in the area. This annoyed Lieutenant-Colonel Tom Beckett (commanding officer of 1 Para) who demanded that all CIA operatives clear their routines in the 1 Para area of operations through the Ops Room at Camp Abu Naji.

Because of the flat area in and around Majar al-Kabir, VHF and HF communications were extremely limited. Even when soldiers were in close proximity, communication was hampered by blackspots. 1 Para had Iridium phones, sat-phones and Personal Role Radios (PRRs).

A memorandum of understanding (MOU) was reached between the British Forces and local people that no more house searches would take place. The British believed that this understanding also meant that they would still patrol through the streets (showing and maintaining a presence), but the locals maintain that this was not in the agreement. It was later remarked that the British were not in the habit of creating "no-go zones" for themselves. On the 21 June, three days before the Battle of Majar al-Kabir, Major Kemp went into the town to meet the elders and inform them that there would be a British military presence at the police station where they would collect, but not search for, weapons. At the inquest into the men's deaths in March 2006, it was noted that there had been a mis-translation in the text of the MOU which the Iraqi population read as there being "no necessity that the coalition [troops] be there [the following day]."

Two days before the killings, Two-Zero Alpha, an element of 8 Platoon, C Company (1 Parachute Regiment) were at the police station in Majar al-Kabir to collect weapons that were to be handed in under the amnesty agreement. With some men on guard duty, the rest were sunbathing and relaxing when a crowd of angry Iraqis arrived at the police station throwing rocks and chanting "no, no, America". In the unrest that followed, a DAF truck and the Land Rover belonging to Two-Zero Alpha were destroyed. After some warning shots were fired by the British, including one plastic bullet which deflected off the ground and hit a protester in the face, a Quick Reaction Force (QRF) was activated and they arrived in Scimitars and armed Land Rovers to push back the crowd.

== Battle ==
On the morning of the battle, a support company platoon had driven through the town and when they reached Camp Abu Naji, they described the area as being "eerily quiet" and those locals that were out on the streets giving them "death stares".

=== Alpha and Bravo Company ===
Alpha and Bravo Company, both of 8 Platoon, 1 Para, arrived in Majar al-Kabir at 9:25 am on 24 June with the intention of carrying out foot patrols through the town. Before leaving, Lieutenant Ross Kennedy (the Officer in Command (OIC) of the two companies) asked for more baton rounds (plastic bullets) for his baton gun. The request was denied as all the spare rounds were packed away before the Parachute Regiment left the area to return to the UK in seven days' time. This left his two patrols (Alpha and Bravo) with only 13 baton rounds. At just after 10:00 am local time, the local Iraqi militia commander (Talal Abid Ahmed Zubaida) drove up to the patrol and stopped them from going further. Zubaida told them that the town was dangerous and that they would be shot at. Lieutenant Kennedy offered to change the route of the patrol, but Zubaida warned him that the route was an issue too and that if he went into the town, it would have to be without Zubaida's militia. The British managed to negotiate a vehicle-mounted patrol through the town as a compromise with Zubaida. Alpha Company would remain at the Militia headquarters with other vehicles whilst the Iraqi Militia would accompany Bravo, mounted on Pinzgauers, on a patrol through the town; the British felt that not to have patrolled would be a sign of weakness. At 10:10 am, Bravo company entered the town and almost immediately were showered with rocks thrown by "smiling locals."

At 10:25 am, Bravo Company de-bussed as the Iraqis were swarming around them and the ringleaders in the crowd were encouraging the locals to attack Bravo Company. As they de-bussed to throw back the crowd, the rear vehicle noticed that the Iraqi Militia contingent were no longer in the convoy. Such was the intensity of the rock throwing and the sheer numbers of locals in the crowd, Bravo took the decision to fire rubber bullets at the ringleaders. Although the soldiers were well aware that using rubber bullets could either calm or inflame a situation, they felt that they had no choice given the intensity of the crowd, who were being told via the loudspeakers on the minarets that the British were here to "rape the women [and] attack them!" One of the ringleaders was identified, and a corporal using the baton gun fired and felled the ringleader from 20 feet (6.1 m) away. After two more baton rounds were fired, the crowd surged forward and the Non-commissioned officer (NCO) of Bravo Company (Sgt Gordon Robertson) fired warning shots into the air from his rifle and other troops followed suit. At this the crowd moved back and allowed them space to move, but it was later realized that the local Iraqis had gone to get their weapons. In their minds, the British had fired first, so it was a matter of pride that they returned fire. At 10:30 am, Iraqi gunmen would return fire and Bravo would defend themselves with the result of the first Iraqis dying. One witness in the crowd claimed that children were throwing stones at the Paratroopers and when one of the paratroopers went into a firing position, a local man called Tassir thought a child would be shot, so he levelled his weapon at the paratroopers. The British troops fired on him first as they thought he was going to shoot, and after that, the crowd became completely hostile. At this point, the RMP patrol was only 200 metres (660 ft) away from the Paratroopers. Ahmed Younis, a member of the crowd on the morning, said

The market was very crowded. I threw myself on the ground and shouted to everyone to run away or get down. The shooting lasted about five minutes but there were bullets going everywhere. They were firing on automatic. I couldn't believe it when they started shooting.

Sheikh Shejar said

The Iraqi side fired first. Later they went to the police station and attacked there. The mob wanted to shelter at the police station and use it as a base to attack the British.

Back at the Militia Headquarters, Alpha Company were crouched down behind their vehicles dodging the rocks being thrown at them by an angry crowd. They were able to distinguish between the sound of rounds being fired from an AK-47 and an SA-80 rifle by their relative pitches. They realized that Bravo were under fire and returning fire themselves. Without communications, Alpha mounted up and drove into the town having to guess where Bravo would be by the sound of the gunfire. Alpha came under sustained and heavy fire at a crossroads 100 metres (330 ft) from the police station. Standard Operating Procedure (SOP) under these conditions is to de-bus. The troops from Alpha spread out, with some taking cover under their DAF truck. Despite the short distance and the availability of line of sight, no members of Alpha had seen or recognized the Land Rovers of the RMP patrol at the police station, though at that point, the Land Rovers may have been moved inside the police station compound. Alpha suppressed the enemy fire, but the DAF truck needed to be jump-started due to mechanical problems. (Note: The DAF's engine was problematic and the coalition fuel used, JP8, often disagreed with the engine.) With some troops providing cover, the rest of Alpha pushed the truck until it started. They then mounted up and sped north, targeted by gunmen all the way but managed to reach a point of safety north of the town. They de-bussed and took up defensive positions; the sitrep was phoned in to the Ops Room back at Abu Naji.

Meanwhile, Bravo were looking for an exit. As they were attacked from the front and had to stop, Sgt Gordon Robertson managed to reach the Ops Room at Camp Abu Naji and relay their situation. At this point Bravo had no casualties, but did need an ammunition re-supply. They were eager to know Alpha Company's location and situation. During heavy fighting, Bravo lost one of their Pinzgauers to an RPG round which detonated the fuel tank. A few minutes later, the second Pinzgauer was on fire and Bravo were having to fight through the streets to get to cover.

Alpha mounted back up at 10:50 am to drive back into town and try to assist Bravo Company. This request had come from the Ops Room and had been worded carefully so as not to sound like an order; only the commander on the ground could assess whether or not Alpha could be of any use. As they expected, they came under contact with heavy fire almost immediately and they had to de-bus from the DAF truck. An RPG was fired at the truck, but was deflected just in front of the vehicle by an electricity cable.

At this time (between 11:00 and 11:15 am), Alpha, Bravo and the six RMP personnel were within 400 metres (1,300 ft) of each other, but unable to communicate or group together; Alpha and Bravo Companies were completely unaware that the RMPs were even in the town and vice versa, even though they had all gone through the same Ops Room that morning. An Army Air Corps (AAC) Gazelle helicopter was dispatched to act as a re-broadcast unit between Alpha, Bravo and the Ops Room. Critically, it had also been given orders for a fly-over of the police station to determine if the six RMP NCOs were still there. At 11:05 am, a Chinook with a Quick Reaction Force (QRF) was deployed from Abu Naji to go into Majar al-Kabir and support Bravo Company.

At about 11:15 am, Bravo entered a house in the town to take cover. The Iraqi family who lived in the house were told to lie on the floor; not because they were hostages, but for their own safety in case anyone outside had seen Bravo entering and tried to shoot into the house. Alpha were pinned down by effective fire 500 metres (1,600 ft) from the police station on the northern side of town. The Officer in Charge (OIC) of Alpha, Lieutenant Ross Kennedy, was being targeted by a sniper, and so the decision was made to hold until the QRF (Quick Reaction Force) arrived from Abu Naji to help. Bravo deployed mini-flares on the roof of the house that they were occupying to alert the Chinook to their presence. Unfortunately, because of damage and casualties, the Chinook had to return to Abu Naji. The setting off of the mini-flares did alert the Iraqi gunmen to Bravo's position, who now found themselves having to shoot out of the house at the armed Iraqis clambering over the walls to get to them. At 11:30 am, Bravo split into two sections so that one section stayed behind and provided covering fire for the other section. They manoeuvred and fired in turn until both sections met up again to form just one. Bravo managed to get clear just as the mob had encircled the house they were in. Bravo maintained a northwards direction along an irrigation ditch, which slowed them down because of the mud that was sticking to their boots. They could hear the engines of the Scimitars and the Land Rovers of the QRF. Sgt Robertson launched mini-flares to alert the QRF to his position, but he was unable to know if the QRF had seen them. Therefore, Private Freddy Ellis was tasked to cover 400 metres (1,300 ft) of dead ground between them and the QRF wagons. Ellis stripped off his webbing and ran, zigzagging all the way to the QRF column to relate the position of Bravo Company.

A Manoeuvre Support Group (MSG) with armed Land Rovers (Note: The armed Land Rovers are known as WMIKs - Weapon Mounted Installation Kit. These are typically a heavier calibre type weapon such as a .50 Cal Browning, a General-purpose machine gun (GPMG) or a MILAN, an anti-armour missile system with a range of about 1.2 miles (2 km).) was dispatched by land from Abu Naji at 11:05 am to set up and Incident Command Post (ICP) on the northern edge of Majar al-Kabir. This done, the column of vehicles sped into town and arrived about 11:38 am. They came under fire almost immediately from AK-47s, and as they returned fire (using the .50 cal Browning) they noticed Alpha Company in the ditches to their east. By 12:00 pm, all known soldiers on the ground had been accounted for and an update had been passed to the Ops Room back at Abu Naji. However, at that time, Doctor Firas Fasal, an Iraqi doctor who was working at the hospital in the town, had approached the ICP north of the town to inform the OIC (Major Kemp) that there was four British Hostages in the police station.

=== The Chinook and air support ===
As part of a multi-pronged approach to a rescue, a Chinook helicopter of No. 27 Squadron RAF was mobilised from Abu Naji to Majar al-Kabir with a quick reaction force on board. The helicopter lifted off at 11:05 am and returned to Abu Naji around 11:30 am (Note: The flight time to Majar al-Kabir was estimated to be around 8 minutes time; 16 minutes for the round trip.) after coming under sustained fire and having at least seven casualties aboard, who were wounded by the insurgent fire. The helicopter's route into the town meant it had to fly over the rooftops to try and locate Bravo Company who were holed up in one of the houses. Because it flew in at low altitude, it presented a target for small-arms fire and RPGs, with no fewer than six RPGs being fired at it. As the damage to the helicopter was severe and casualties were mounting, the pilot, Wing Commander Guy Van den Berg, decided that safest option was to return to base. The Sergeant in charge of the QRF asked that the helicopter land away from the immediate danger and allow the non-wounded on board to disembark. Van den Berg replied that, if the Chinook landed, it might not get off the ground again.

When the Chinook arrived back at Abu Naji, the wounded were taken off and some of them, after triaging and emergency first aid, were reloaded onto the Chinook for onward transfer to a more secure medical facility. With its rotors still running, (turning and burning) the RAF ground crew assessed the damage to the airframe. The helicopter had at least 100 holes in its fuselage and one shot had missed the gearbox by less than 3 inches (76 mm); if it had penetrated the gearbox, it would have caused the helicopter to crash. The cockpit and pilot seats on the helicopter were armour-protected, but the rest of the airframe was not.

No helicopter gunships were available to assist ground forces. Close air support was limited to two USAF F-15 Eagle aircraft. The two aircraft, returning from another sortie and low on fuel, were carrying 1,000-pound (450 kg) bombs. The Ops Room could not communicate with any Forward Air Controllers (FACs) on the ground, so the two aircraft could only buzz the town, very low and fast. Due to the inability to pinpoint the enemy, dropping the bombs might well have had an extremely detrimental effect on the British troops below.

=== The Six RMP ===
On the morning of 24 June, the six RMP of 156 Provost Company, were in Majar al-Kabir as part of the training programme for the local Iraqi police. The NCO in charge of the RMP section was Sergeant Simon Hamilton-Jewell, who had informed his Royal Military Police chain of command that he was leaving and where he and his section would be going. Despite a Standing Order that everyone be issued with a satellite phone for communication, Hamilton-Jewell was informed that none was available. The RMP had gone to Majar al-Kabir to ask why the local police force had not intervened in a stoning two days earlier. The RMP left Camp Abu Naji at 9:10 am local time and arrived in Majar al-Kabir twenty to thirty minutes later between 9:30 and 9:40 am. They were due to move on to other locations at Qalat Salih and Al Uzayr (at 14:00 to meet a senior British officer) before returning to their base around 17:00. When they arrived at the police station, their Iraqi interpreter was waiting for them and all seemed calm.

The interpreter, Sergeant (Sgt) Simon Hamilton-Jewell, Corporal (Cpl) Russ Aston and Lance Corporal (LCpl) Ben Hyde moved off to the police station leaving Corporal Paul Long, Corporal Simon Miller and Lance Corporal Thomas Keys to stay behind with the vehicles, weapons and body armour. While the RMP were talking in the police station, they heard the gunfire and went outside to investigate. When a crowd had formed and some of them were firing into the air, Sergeant Hamilton-Jewell ordered the Land Rovers into the compound. At this point, some of the Iraqi Police left, promising to find out what was going on, but it was believed that they were planning an escape. The crowd swelled to between 400 and 600 people (Note: As the numbers in the crowd are estimated and vary from eye-witness accounts, no definitive number can be given.) then advanced upon the police station after finding out that British soldiers were there. At this time, the Ops Room at Abu Naji were being informed that the six RMP might still be in Majar al-Kabir by their chain of command. As there had been no communication with the six RMP, it could not be definitely asserted as to where they were.

In the initial stages of the attack, one of the Land Rovers was set on fire and another was driven away. One of the RMP, Cpl Miller was wounded by small arms fire as they ran for cover inside the police station. When the situation deteriorated even further, the Iraqi police left the compound through some open windows at the back and in doing so, encouraged the six British policeman to escape too. The Iraqi policemen feared that they would be shot for being traitors and so decided to leave, but the RMP decided the best policy was to stay behind and defend their position while awaiting help. They asked the Iraqis for a radio before they left, but the Iraqi policeman did not have one to give them. The area around Majar al-Kabir is very flat and as a result, HF and VHF radios do not work well; even within close range, there are dead zones where the signal cannot be accessed. The Paratroopers had PRRs (Personal Role Radios), an Iridium satellite phone and a VHF radio. All the RMP had was a selection of radios in their Land Rovers.

An Iraqi elder appealed to the gunmen surrounding the station to stop shooting and he went to go inside and was granted access by LCpl Tom Keys. The elder could see that at this point, Cpl Si Miller had multiple wounds and was bleeding badly. Despite wanting to be the mediator, he was advised to leave by the gunmen in the crowd.

"You have to leave; we want to kill the soldiers." (Unidentified gunman)

"But the trouble is not to do with them; it is not of their making." (Iraqi elder)

"If you do not leave, you will be killed as well."(Unidentified gunman)

During the attack, an Iraqi doctor who was next door to the police station was alerted to the fact of the six RMP being under siege and drove to the edge of town in an ambulance where a major from 1 Para had established an Incident Control Point (ICP). He informed the Paratroopers of the RMP plight at about midday local time and conveyed to the Paratroopers that the RMP were being held hostage. At 12:30 pm, Dr. Fasal returned to the ICP and informed Major Kemp that three of the British were dead. By now, with all 1 Para troops accounted for, the staff in the Ops Room were wondering who they could be and realized that they must be the six-man RMP section. By the time the doctor had returned to the police station, all of the RMP were dead, and for a third time, he returned to the checkpoint with the bad news. Later, Dr. Fasal brought all of the bodies out to the checkpoint and handed them over to the British.

At 13:40, Lieutenant Colonel Beckett ordered all troops to withdraw from the town. With all soldiers accounted for and the bodies recovered, Beckett decided to stop the fighting.

=== Post battle ===
All of the bodies returned were loaded onto an ambulance and identified by the lieutenant in charge of the RMP detachment at Abu Naji. Each body had at least 30 wounds; not only had whole magazines been emptied into the men, but they had also suffered rifle butts to the face and body and some had stomp wounds.

Many things went wrong with the operation that came to light afterwards, such as the RMP only having 50 rounds each, when the minimum should have been 150. In the post-invasion time, it was not only their ammunition that had been de-scaled; the RMP had no morphine and no smoke grenades either. A smoke grenade might have alerted the passing helicopters to their position. They did not have an Iridium satellite phone to call out of the area and, because of a lack of intelligence and information sharing, the Paratroopers and the RMP were unaware of each others' location. Accusations that the Paras had left the RMP behind were denied in the press by senior commanders just days after the event.

Dr. Fasal was one of the few Iraqis who had expressed remorse about the situation.

It was a tragedy. No one here is happy about what happened. I told the British soldiers the people who killed your men are animals and not all the people of Majar al-Kabir are like that. It does not mean that all the people here hate the British.

Soldiers aboard the Chinook helicopter were taken back to their base with at least two needing medical evacuation to the No. 202 Field Hospital before being moved to an American medical care facility in Kuwait. Paratrooper Damien 'Pebbles' Mason received a life-changing wound to his right temple that left him epileptic and unable to continue serving as a soldier.

On learning that the six RMP were dead, Lieutenant Colonel Tom Beckett, officer commanding 1 Para, ordered the withdrawal of troops from the town. This was vastly unpopular with the troops on the ground and earned him several derogatory nicknames. Later, many troops realised that he was in a 'lose-lose' situation. If Beckett had allowed the soldiers to go back in again, there would have been many more deaths on both sides and, as one soldier acknowledged, "he would have ended up sacked if he'd let us [back] in there that day". The decision not to go in and recover the bodies, but to allow the Iraqi doctor to deliver them to 1 Para, was commended by the Army Board of Inquiry as correct and prevented further losses on both sides. 1 Para were criticized for not going in and rescuing the RMP, but at the inquest, Lieutenant Kennedy stated that no-one on the ground in Majar al-Kabir was aware of their presence until they were informed of their location by Dr. Fasal and quite soon after he had returned to inform them of their [the RMP] deaths.

== Aftermath ==
The police station site was not secured until several days after the event. Only Corporal Si Miller's SA-80 rifle was recovered from the scene. Tests proved that it had not been fired since it was last cleaned which led to the belief that despite the danger they were in; the six RMP did not fire at or into the crowd. One of the Iraqi eye-witnesses to the event, Sheikh Shejar (head of the Al Shuganbah tribe) later stated that at least one of the RMP had fired and. in doing so, had killed someone in the crowd. However, Mark Nichol in his book, Last Round, states that it would have been against the RMP Standard operating procedure (SOP) to fire upon a crowd of protestors.

A couple of days after the incident, members of G squadron 22 SAS arrived in the town to conduct Operation Jocal to find those responsible. They gathered intelligence on who was involved and then withdrew under fire from armed Iraqis. British military commanders discouraged the SAS from returning to arrest those responsible.

The deaths of the six RMP caused a great deal of political unrest in the UK as it was (up to that point) the biggest single loss of life of British forces under enemy fire since the Falklands War. Each of the multiples of British troops that fought in the town (Alpha, Bravo and the QRF) determined that they had killed at least 20 Iraqi nationals each (thereby totaling 60 dead) (Note: Estimates of the dead vary; Nichol states that they could have been as high as 100.) with countless more wounded. Local people claimed that the number of Iraqi dead totalled only four, which was seen as a more palatable figure for senior British commanders to acknowledge, due to the political instability in the region at that time.

Following the Battle of Danny Boy in Iraq on 14 May 2004, British soldiers detained nine Iraqi insurgents and removed the bodies of dead insurgents from the battlefield under an executive order to identify possible suspects in the killing of the six RMP in June 2003. This led to unfounded allegations about the treatment of Iraqi detainees resulting in the Al Sweady Inquiry.

Lieutenant Ross Kennedy and Corporal John Dolman were both Mentioned in Despatches for the battle and Sergeant Gordon Robertson was awarded the Conspicuous Gallantry Cross. Sgt Robertson was presented with the medal in a ceremony at Buckingham Palace by Her Majesty, The Queen. Robertson was unhappy with being awarded the medal and was reluctant to be put on a pedestal and being made to stand and pose with the medal on his uniform; so he left the army and attended the ceremony in civilian attire. In 2016, it was reported that Gordon Robertson was selling his medals, including the Conspicuous Gallantry Cross (CGC), in order to raise money and allow his son to get onto the property ladder.

John Dolman, the Parachute Regiment Corporal who was the first to fire a rubber bullet on the morning of 24 June, was killed in Baghdad in January 2005. He had left the British Army in 2004 and was working for a private security company. In February 2005, BBC Two screened a documentary about the killings called The Death of the Redcaps which included off-the- record interviews with members of the army. The British Army's own Board of Inquiry (BoI) into the accident was convened in March 2004. It did not apportion blame to any individual due to a clause in Queen's Regulations, but did find failures in the system of reporting, accounting and of communication. The BoI was held in camera, as it was felt that the presence of the families would be prejudicial to the evidence. During the cross-examination of witnesses, the Army appointed investigators, put direct questions to the Parachute Regiment troops. These were accusations of abandonment of the RMP by the Paras and the inference that the platoons had only gone into the town to get some kills as it was one of their last patrols. All of these accusations were vehemently denied.

When the BoI report was finalised in November 2004, the Defence Secretary, Geoff Hoon, took the unusual step of releasing some of its content into the public domain. The families of the RMP were briefed separately by the commander of the BoI and Mr Hoon addressed Parliament.

In the 2005 General Election, the father of Thomas Keys stood against the prime minister, Tony Blair, in his Sedgefield constituency. Reg Keys secured 10% of the vote with 4,252 votes against 24,421 votes for Tony Blair who was duly returned as the MP for Sedgefield. In his post-election speech, Reg Keys called on Tony Blair to apologise to the families of all the dead servicemen and women who had been casualties of the Iraq War.

An inquest into the deaths of the six men was opened in March 2006 in Oxfordshire. The inquest heard evidence that the men were only issued with 50 rounds each for their SA-80 rifles and that no satellite phone was allocated to them, although 37 units were available and there was nothing to prevent the Red Caps from signing one out. The inquest heard detailed reports of the men's injuries at the hands of the mob with multiple gunshot wounds to hands, legs, arms and faces. Relatives at the inquest demanded an apology from Dr Nicholas Hunt, the government-appointed pathologist, as he had used photographs of the dead men in a seminar in how to set up temporary mortuaries in disaster zones without permission from the families.

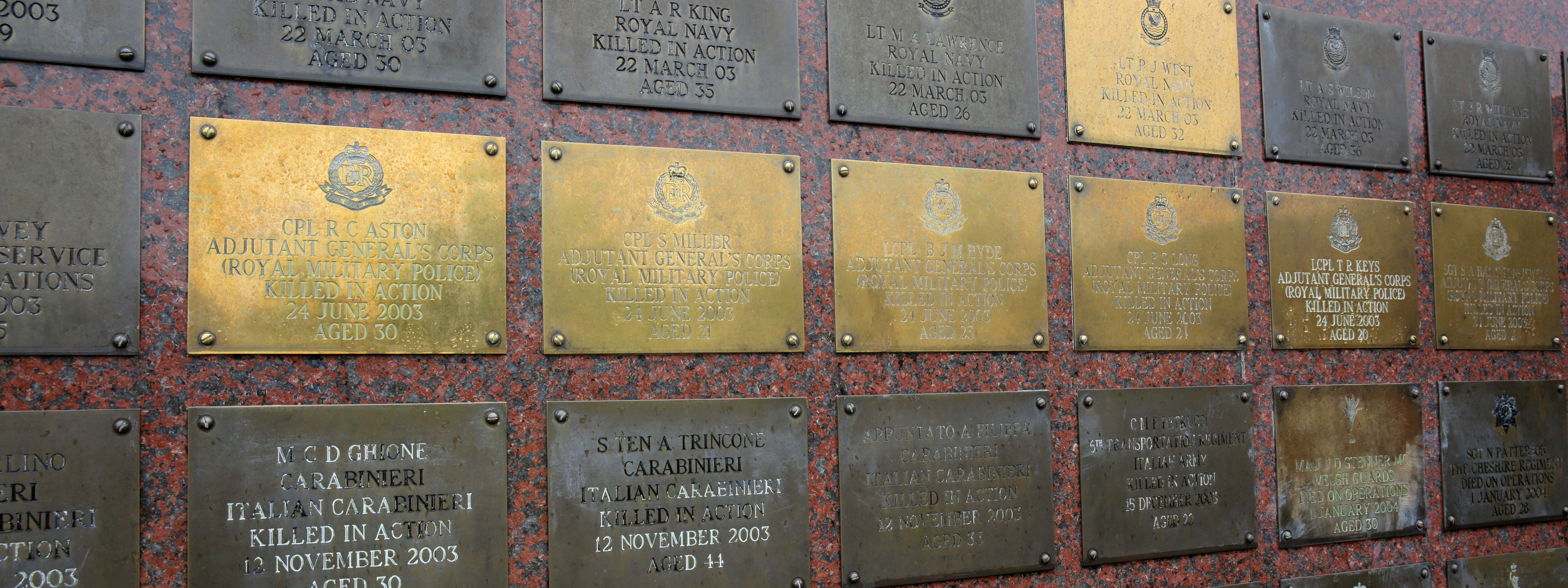
The plates of the six RMPs on the Basra memorial wall at the NMA

The inquest lasted three weeks and was closed in late March 2006. The coroner, Mr Nicholas Gardiner, ruled that the men were unlawfully killed.

An SAS Sergeant died when the specialist unit raided a terrorist cell in Basra in November 2006. It was later determined that although the bullet was a ricochet and not a direct shot, it could have been friendly fire from his colleagues. However, forensic analysis of the round determined it was issued in 1994 and led investigators to believe it was a round that had disappeared along with five SA-80 rifles from the police station in Majar al-Kabir.

In February 2010, it was reported that eight Iraqi nationals had been arrested in conjunction with the killings and had been detained by US forces and transferred to Baghdad. In October of the same year, six of the accused were released without charge and the trial of the remaining two suspects collapsed after two hours. The families of the six RMP who were killed were reported to be outraged as in 2003, Geoff Hoon (the defence minister at that time) had told them that the MoD knew who the killers were. On the tenth anniversary of the killings in 2013, fresh calls were made by the families of the dead for an independent public inquiry as they did not believe that the MoD's own internal enquiry was robust enough, with one relative calling it "flawed". This was then followed with at least two of the families attempting to sue the MoD for negligence in relation to the soldiers' deaths. The families stated that the MoD should be responsible for the duty of care.

In December 2013, it was revealed that the Ministry of Defence had paid out tens of thousands of pounds in compensation to nine Iraqi policeman who were said to have been beaten up by the SAS. The special forces troops had been investigating the six RMP deaths and been accused of beating the suspects with rifles, placing them in stress positions and subjecting them to punches and kickings.

A request for a second inquiry into the deaths of four of the six RMP was lodged in 2014. The attorney general rejected their appeal in June 2017 on the grounds that a new inquiry did not have a "reasonable chance of success."

In July 2019, The European Court of Human Rights ruled that UK authorities fulfilled their duty to carry out an effective investigation into the killings.
