= Bill Etherington =

British Labour Party politician

Member of Parliament for Sunderland North
- In office 10 April 1992 – 12 April 2010
- Preceded by: Bob Clay
- Succeeded by: Constituency abolished

Personal details
- Born: 17 July 1941 (age 85) Sunderland, County Durham, England
- Party: Labour
- Spouse: Irene Holton
- Education: Durham University

William Etherington (born 17 July 1941) is a British Labour Party politician who was the Member of Parliament for Sunderland North from 1992 to 2010.

== Early life ==
Bill Etherington was born in Sunderland, County Durham and was educated at the Redby Infant and Junior Schools on Fulwell Road, Monkwearmouth Grammar School (five years above Hilary Armstrong) and latterly at Durham University. He was an apprentice fitter at the Austin and Pickersgill Shipyard in Sunderland for five years from 1957. He became a fitter for Beal & Co in Sunderland in 1962, before joining the National Coal Board in 1963 and for the following twenty years worked as a fitter at the Dawdon Colliery in County Durham. He has been a member of the National Union of Mineworkers (NUM) since 1963, and from 1983 until his election was a full-time trade union official with them, as general secretary of its Durham Colliery Mechanics' Association affiliate. He was a full-time official during the UK miners' strike (1984-1985). From 1988 to 1992, he was also vice president of the North East Region of the NUM.

== Parliamentary career ==
He was first elected in the 1992 General Election for Sunderland North, replacing fellow left-winger, Bob Clay. Etherington held the seat comfortably with a majority of 17,004 votes, and was re-elected with strong majorities subsequently. He made his maiden speech on 11 May 1992.

In the 1992 general election, he polled 60.7% of the vote, with his Conservative opponent winning 26.9% of the vote. In the 1997 election, he took 68.2% against Conservative Andrew Selous, who ranked in second place with just 16.7% of the vote. He also confidently beat his Conservative opponents in the 2001 (62.7% against 17.9%) and 2005 general elections (54.4% against 19.8%).

He is a left-winger, a member of the Socialist Campaign Group and rebelled against Tony Blair's government. While debating the reform of the House of Lords in March 2007, Etherington also called for the abolition of the British Monarchy.

== Personal life ==
He has been married to Irene Holton since 1963 and they have two daughters. He was characterised in parliament by his three-piece suits and strong 'Mackem' accent.

In December 2006, Etherington announced he would be standing down at the end of the 2005 - 2010 Parliament as his constituency was to be abolished.

== Notes ==
Parliament of the United Kingdom
Preceded by Bob Clay	Member of Parliament for Sunderland North; 1992–2010	Constituency abolished
