= NY-LON =

- Genre: Drama
- Created by: Simon Burke; Anya Camilleri
- Written by: Simon Burke; Anya Camilleri
- Directed by: Otto Bathurst; Keith Boak; Anya Camilleri
- Starring: Rashida Jones; Stephen Moyer
- Opening theme: "Oh Katrina" performed by Tender Trap
- Ending theme: "Tuesday's Girl" performed by Akayzia Parker
- Composer: Hal Lindes
- Country of origin: United Kingdom
- Original language: English
- No. of seasons: 1
- No. of episodes: 7

Production
- Executive producer: Rob Pursey
- Producer: Peter Norris
- Running time: 50 mins.
- Production companies: Touchpaper Television; Pandemonium Films

Original release
- Network: Channel 4
- Release: 24 August – 5 October 2004

NY-LON is a 2004 British drama series that aired on Channel 4 in the United Kingdom. The series was created and written by Simon Burke and Anya Camilleri, and starred Rashida Jones and Stephen Moyer. NY-LON was also broadcast on BBC America in the United States.

== Synopsis ==
The series chronicles the transatlantic romance between Edie Miller (Rashida Jones), who is from New York City and Michael Antonioni (Stephen Moyer), who is from London. NY-LON is the first British drama filmed in both London and New York City. The scenes in New York City were filmed in the neighborhoods of the Lower East Side and East Village.

== Cast ==
- Rashida Jones as Edie Miller
- Stephen Moyer as Michael Antonioni
- Christine Adams as Katherine Williams Osgood
- Rachel Miner as Astrid
- David Rogers as Luke
- Emily Corrie as Lauren Antonioni
- Navin Chowdhry as Ralph

== Episodes ==
1. "Something about Chemicals"
2. "Something about Baggage"
3. "Something about Commitment"
4. "Something about Honesty"
5. "Something about Family"
6. "Something about Friends"
7. "Something about Love"

== American adaptation ==
In March 2008, CBS announced plans to remake the series for American audiences, with Elisha Cuthbert taking a starring role, but CBS did not move forward with producing a series.
