= Everyman and Playhouse Youth Theatre =

Coordinates: 53°24′11.9″N 2°58′9.8″W

The Everyman and Playhouse Youth Theatre is a Liverpool-based stage and drama company for young people in Merseyside. Located at Liverpool's Everyman Theatre, the Youth Theatre is open to teenagers and provides weekly sessions in a wide variety of skills, covering everything from storytelling to stage combat. It gives members the opportunity to act, direct, dance, design, sing, improvise, and work on a range of scripts from Shakespeare to brand-new plays.

== Productions ==
Each year, the entire youth theatre cast presents full-scale productions for the Everyman stage. These have included Julius Caesar in October 2007, and Monkey! as part of the Capital of Culture Year programme in 2008. The group was closely involved in the development of Frank Cottrell-Boyce's Proper Clever, his first script for the stage which was produced at the Playhouse in October 2008. Senior members of the Youth Theatre presented their first studio production, Timberlake Wertenbaker's The Love of the Nightingale, at the Everyman Theatre in 2009.

February 2012 saw the YEP's (Young Everyman Playhouse) inaugural production, a site specific piece called Intimate held at Camp and Furnace, which the Liverpool Daily Post described as "a piece of promenade theatre, that invites the audience to walk in their shoes – whether serving in the armed forces, waiting for a loved one to return from service or understanding what a war on the other side of the world means". The Liverpool Echo reviewed Intimate, giving it 8/10 and calling it "powerful". In March 2012, YEP performed a devised promenade piece called You Are Being Watched, which was a look at how apparent CCTV is in modern-day Britain. Made Up: On Stage in Liverpool described You Are Being Watched by saying, "Devised by the company's Young Actors, the show made the best of everything at its disposal. Some entertaining performances, good use of effects and sound, and an imaginative premise made it easy to enjoy."

== History ==
=== Everyman Youth Theatre ===
Originally set up in the mid-1970s, Liverpool's Everyman Youth Theatre quickly became one of Britain's most successful youth theatres, with over 300 members at its peak. It ran for nearly twenty years, until the Everyman Theatre went into liquidation and closed its doors in 1993.

=== New Everyman Youth Theatre ===
After having nurtured and encouraged so much young talent on Merseyside, there was great disappointment at the loss of the facility for young people. By 1998 a devoted group of supporters founded the New Everyman Youth Theatre. Launched with funds from the Everyman Supporters Club — including many high-profile members — the group continued with the help of grants, donations and revenue from ticket sales.

=== Everyman and Playhouse Youth Theatre ===
On 25 November 2006 the Youth Theatre returned to its original home to become the Everyman and Playhouse Youth Theatre.

=== YEP — Young Everyman Playhouse ===
The organisation was subsequently relaunched and rebranded as YEP — Young Everyman Playhouse — in 2012.

== Notable alumni ==
Many notable actors, musicians, writers, and other entertainers developed their interest in the performing arts at the Youth Theatre, such as Les Bubb, Bobby Schofield, Malandra Burrows, Darci Shaw, Chris Mason, Stephen Graham, Ian Hart, Gillian Kearney, Spencer Leigh, the McGann brothers (Joe, Mark, Paul, and Stephen), Katherine Rose Morley, David Morrissey, Con O'Neill, Angie Sammons, Michael Starke, Heidi Thomas, and Cathy Tyson.
