= Fred Willey =

British politician (1910–1987)

The Right Honourable Frederick Willey

Chair of the Parliamentary Labour Party
- In office 14 June 1979 – 19 November 1981
- Leader: James Callaghan; Michael Foot
- Preceded by: Cledwyn Hughes
- Succeeded by: Jack Dormand

Minister of State for Housing and Local Government
- In office 18 October 1964 – 19 June 1970
- Monarch: Elizabeth II
- Prime Minister: Harold Wilson
- Succeeded by: Graham Page

Parliamentary Secretary to the Minister of Food
- In office 18 April 1950 – 26 October 1951
- Leader: Clement Attlee
- Preceded by: Stanley Evans
- Succeeded by: Charles Hill

Member of Parliament for Sunderland North Sunderland (1945-1950)
- In office 5 July 1945 – 13 May 1983
- Preceded by: Stephen Furness
- Succeeded by: Bob Clay

Personal details
- Born: 13 November 1910
- Died: 13 December 1987 (aged 77)
- Party: Labour
- Spouse: Eleanor Snowdon
- Education: St John's College, Cambridge

Frederick Thomas Willey (13 November 1910 – 13 December 1987) was a British Labour Party politician. He was a Member of Parliament (MP) representing a Sunderland constituency for 38 years, from 1945 to 1983.

== Early life ==
Willey was educated at Durham Johnston School and St John's College, Cambridge, where he graduated with a first-class degree in law and won the Blackstone Prize and a Harmsworth studentship. He was called to the Bar at the Middle Temple in 1936, and later worked as a barrister on the Northern Circuit.

His political career as an activist for social justice and other left-wing causes began in the 1930s, when he was the keynote speaker welcoming returning International Brigade volunteers to Sunderland.

== Military career ==
During the Second World War Willey served with the Auxiliary Fire Service (AFS) and was an officer of the Fire Brigades Union.

== Parliamentary career ==
Willey was elected to the House of Commons as Member of Parliament (MP) for Sunderland in 1945, when the Borough still sent two MPs to Parliament. In 1950 two-member constituencies were abolished and Willey was returned for the new constituency of Sunderland North, where he served until he retired before the general election of 1983.

Willey served as Parliamentary Secretary to the Ministry of Food from 1950 to 1951, and as Minister of Land and Natural Resources from 1965 to 1967. He opened the UK's first long-distance footpath, the Pennine Way, in 1965.

He served as Chairman of the Parliamentary Labour Party from 1979 to 1981.

Parliament of the United Kingdom
Preceded by Samuel Storey and Stephen Furness	Member of Parliament for Sunderland; 1945–1950; With: Richard Ewart	Constituency abolished
New constituency	Member of Parliament for Sunderland North; 1950–1983	Succeeded by Bob Clay
Political offices
Preceded by Cledwyn Hughes	Chair of the Parliamentary Labour Party; 1979–1981	Succeeded by Jack Dormand
