= Thirteen (TV series) =

British drama miniseries

- Genre: Drama
- Written by: Marnie Dickens
- Directed by: Vanessa Caswill (episodes 1–3); China Moo-Young (episodes 4–5)
- Starring: Jodie Comer; Aneurin Barnard; Valene Kane; Richard Rankin
- Opening theme: "In Your Dreams" by Dark Dark Dark
- Ending theme: "In Your Dreams" by Dark Dark Dark
- Country of origin: United Kingdom
- Original language: English
- No. of episodes: 5 (list of episodes)

Production
- Executive producer: Elizabeth Kilgarriff
- Producer: Hugh Warren
- Production locations: Bristol, England
- Running time: 60 minutes

Original release
- Network: BBC Three; BBC Two
- Release: 28 February – 27 March 2016

Thirteen is a British drama miniseries written by Marnie Dickens. The series centres on Ivy Moxam (Jodie Comer), a 26-year-old woman who escapes from the cellar where she has been imprisoned for 13 years, and the impact on her family.

The first episode was released on BBC Three in the UK on 28 February 2016. It began airing on BBC America in the United States on 23 June 2016. Each episode was broadcast on BBC Two a week after its release, with the first on 6 March 2016. In Saudi Arabia and the rest of the Middle East, the series began airing in the middle of August 2016.

On 27 March 2016, Dickens stated that there would not be a second series of the show as it was intended to be a one-off.

== Cast ==
- Jodie Comer as Ivy Moxam
- Aneurin Barnard as Tim Hobson
- Valene Kane as D.S. Lisa Merchant
- Richard Rankin as D.I. Elliott Carne
- Natasha Little as Christina Moxam
- Stuart Graham as Angus Moxam
- Peter McDonald as Mark White
- Joe Layton as Craig Watts
- Katherine Rose Morley as Emma Moxam
- Eleanor Wyld as Eloise Wye
- Ariyon Bakare as Chief Supt Burridge
- Nicholas Farrell as Henry Stone
- Kemi-Bo Jacobs as Yazz
- Melina Matthews as Sofía Marín
- Chipo Chung as Alia Symes
- Colin Mace as DSI Harold Winters
- Suzette Llewellyn as Angela Hill
- Charles Babalola as Jesse

== Episodes ==
No. in series	Title	Directed by	Written by	Original release date	UK viewers (millions)
1	"Episode 1"	Vanessa Caswill	Marnie Dickens	28 February 2016	2.4 (BBC Three); 1.26 (BBC Two)
Ivy Moxam, now 26, was abducted at age 13 and has been held in a cellar for the last 13 years. Now she escapes captivity and is taken to the police station. She meets her family liaison officer as well as D.I. Carne and D.S. Merchant, who interview her. Ivy's family is informed after information leaks to the press and DNA test results confirm that she is the Moxams' daughter. Ivy's childhood crush, Tim, has since married, but he delays telling Ivy. Overwhelmed by events, Ivy runs from her home and Tim finds her. Carne tells her that she should 'press play' on her life and start living again, and she decides to write a letter to Tim, as they used to do. Later D.S. Merchant warns Carne that Ivy is getting attached to him; subsequently Ivy tells him that she trusts him and he gives her his business card in case she needs someone to talk to. The police locate the house of Ivy's kidnapper but he has used bleach to remove DNA traces of himself and Ivy. The police find a passport photo of Ivy and hair on the kidnapper's bed, from which they deduce that she has lied about not being let out of the cellar. She tells them that he took her out of the house only once. The police identify a face by tracing his bank cards, which lead them to a petrol station where they obtain security footage of a man whom Ivy confirms as her kidnapper. It is revealed that Henry Stone, the headteacher of Ivy's school (which she should have been attending on the day of her kidnapping), employed Ivy's kidnapper and that the kidnapper has taken a second girl, Phoebe, hostage.
2	"Episode 2"	Vanessa Caswill	Marnie Dickens	6 March 2016	1.2 (BBC Two)
The kidnapping of a second girl, Phoebe, puts more pressure on Ivy to relive her ordeal. Carne and Merchant find themselves surrounded by a new team from Scotland Yard. Ivy is soon summoned back to the police station as Merchant comes up against suspicions, and when evidence is produced which suggests that Ivy has lied to the police about being allowed outside, she comes under fierce scrutiny. She contacts Tim for support but suffers a shattering betrayal when she finds out he is married. At the end of the episode Ivy is seen being dragged away by an unseen person.
3	"Episode 3"	Vanessa Caswill	Marnie Dickens	13 March 2016	1.11 (BBC Two)
Phoebe's father attacks Ivy and tries to drag her away, screaming at her to tell him where his daughter is. Her family quickly helps her but she falls into a state of shock. Ivy tries to reconnect with her sister, but a mysterious letter that seems to be from Mark White threatens their reconciliation. Carne tries to get Ivy to open up about her captivity but is forced to take drastic measures when she refuses to cooperate. As doubts about Ivy's story grow, Merchant returns to White's house, and makes a shocking discovery.
4	"Episode 4"	China Moo-Young	Marnie Dickens	20 March 2016	1.04 (BBC Two)
Ivy is arrested for perverting the course of justice after the discovery in the cellar of the body of Mark White's half-brother Dylan, who went missing in 2009, revealing more inconsistencies and lies from Ivy. She withdraws completely while being questioned as she realises she has lost Carne's trust. Christina begs the police to allow her to speak to her daughter and persuades Ivy to reveal the shocking truth behind her disappearance. Ivy reveals Mark White killed his brother, but only Ivy's DNA is found on the sheet Dylan's body was wrapped in. Meanwhile, Mark White contacts Carne and Merchant and will only talk with Ivy.
5	"Episode 5"	China Moo-Young	Marnie Dickens	27 March 2016	1.16 (BBC Two)
The Moxam family is plunged into the same horror they faced 13 years previously, leaving Ivy faced with the prospect of risking her own life to save Phoebe while being confronted with the memory of her earlier ordeal. Carne and Merchant try to find a way to ensure her safety but have underestimated Mark White, putting themselves in danger. Ivy arranges to meet with Mark White under covert police surveillance. She gets scared and in turn, finds Mark in a photo booth with Phoebe. He abducts Ivy, leaving the shopping centre with her in an industrial bin. Police see Mark leaving with her in a van. They chase him, but he gets away. Ivy is later seen tied to a chair with tape on her mouth. Mark gets cross with her and she persuades him to untie her. He shows her the wardrobe with stuff from their old house, and she sets it up to look like the old one. Mark reports he would be keen to start a family again. He makes Ivy wear a nightgown and a bra that has no underwire. She bathes him and he tries to get her to have sex with him. She then gets his gun and tells him she wants to leave as she now realises how controlling he is. Ivy fires the gun but it is not loaded, and Mark knocks her out. Later, Mark reveals that he wishes he and Ivy could reunite with their miscarried child and his brother in Heaven. He has set a fire downstairs and smoke comes in under the door as Mark and Ivy lie on the bed. She climbs on top of him to kiss him passionately, but instead bites him and smashes his head against the wall. She then escapes the house just as it explodes, and her parents and the police arrive.

== Production ==
The series was shot on location in Bristol. The finale is set in a house in the Lockleaze suburb of Bristol, featuring the Purdown BT Tower, which is mentioned in the show.

The title music is In Your Dreams from the album Wild Go by Dark Dark Dark. The final episode features a cover of Royal Blood's Out of the Black by Billie Marten.

== Reception ==
The series received generally positive reception, with reviews especially praising Comer's performance. The review aggregator, Rotten Tomatoes, gave the series an 88% favourable rating based on 17 reviews, with an average score of 7.2/10.

Writing in the Boston Herald, Mark Perigard wrote: "Thirteen digs into the rhythms of a family trying to rebuild itself on lies. Comer's performance — as a 26-year-old stunted as a 13-year-old — is beautiful. She can be endearing, mystifying and aggravating, sometimes in the same moment." Robert Lloyd in the Los Angeles Times stated: "For a crime story it is unusually gentle and generous toward its characters; it is not cynical or despairing – indeed, it is in the end a love story, or rather, several interlocking love stories set in contrast to the pathological mockery of one." In The Wall Street Journal, Dorothy Rabinowitz praised Comer's performance: "Ms. Comer delivers a compelling portrayal as Ivy, who, even in the grip of terror, projects an air of dangerousness." Sarah Doran of the Radio Times thought that Valene Kane's scenes "...are among the show's most intriguing, simmering with sexual tension and professional frustration."

== DVD release and streaming ==
Thirteen was released on DVD on Region 2 in the United Kingdom and Ireland from 2 Entertain on 18 April 2016, on Region 1 in the United States and Canada via Acorn DVD and BBC DVD on 2 August 2016, and on Region 4 in Australia on 7 September 2016. The series has also been released on DVD in Germany from distribution company Polyband on 27 January 2017.

The series is also available for streaming or purchase via Amazon Video, and is available for streaming on the BBC iPlayer. Peacock also offers the show in the United States.
