= Anya Camilleri =

British film and television director and screenwriter

- Education: University of Reading
- Occupations: Director, screenwriter
- Years active: 1990–present
- Agent: Elizabeth Dench
- Known for: Film "Jealousy"
- Notable work: NY-LON; Two Golden Balls; Incubus; Perfect

Anya Camilleri is a British film and television director and screenwriter of Maltese descent.

== Television ==
After graduating from the University of Reading with a Film and Theatre degree, Camilleri's first industry job was at Working Title Films, where she produced and directed commercials and pop videos, teaming up with Derek Jarman, Mike Newell, amongst others. She then directed a short film The Refund for BBC Television and a music documentary That Was Then, This Is Now (1990) for DEF II (on BBC Two). In 1991, she directed a drama, Eye Contact for Channel 4, starring Jason Isaacs..and in 1992/3, two episodes of Boon and four episodes of The Bill for ITV.

In 1994, Camilleri directed Two Golden Balls, a BBC television movie starting Kim Cattrall and Claire Skinner. Camilleri's other UK television director credits include co-creating, co-writing and lead directing 2 series of Liverpool 1 (1998–1999) which the ITV schedule for 2 years running also two episodes of Hollyoaks Christmas Special Indecent Behaviour.

Camilleri is also the co-creator, co-writer, and a director of the television drama series NY-LON. The title refers to New York City and London conceived as "a single city separated by an ocean". Starring Rashida Jones and Stephen Moyet. The series ran on Britain's Channel 4 from August through October 2009, and was later shown in the United States on BBC America.

More recently, Camilleri directed the episode Isbelle of Jimmy McGovern's Moving On contemporary drama anthology, which aired on BBC One on 6 February 2019.

== Film ==
Camilleri directed the 2006 horror film Incubus, starring Tara Reid. Camilleri's thriller Perfect was shown at the Aesthetica Short Film Festival in 2013. Camilleri directed the short film Jealousy in 2016. In 2017, Camilleri wrote and directed A Girl of No Importance, a short film which premiered at Cannes Short Film Corner. It was shortlisted for the UK Arts & Humanities Research Council's Inspiration Award, which describes the film as "the story of a teenaged prostitute who escapes from her traffickers, only to find herself lost in the medieval streets of Rome."

== Personal life ==
Anya Camilleri is the daughter of the late Maltese composer Charles Camilleri. She is married to Simon Burke, her co-creator and co-writer for Liverpool 1 (2x7 hour series) for ITV and NY-LON, a transatlantic love story for Channel 4, which is partly based on their relationship. They have two children.
