= LA Productions =

British independent television and film production company

- Industry: Film; Television
- Genre: Production company
- Founded: 2000
- Founder: Colin McKeown
- Headquarters: Old St Lawrence School; Westminster Road; Liverpool, Merseyside; L4 3TQ
- Key people: Colin McKeown (owner and Executive Producer); Donna Molloy (Producer); Paul Andrew (Head of Post Production); Sharon Ruddock (General Manager); Daniel Dobinson (Executive Script Editor / Scriptwriter); Harry Machray - (Head of LA Factual)
- Number of employees: 11–50
- Website: laproductions.co.uk

LA Productions Ltd is a British independent television and film production company based in Liverpool, UK. It was founded in 2000 by Brookside co-creator, Colin McKeown, and is known for producing socially-conscious television drama, most prominently for the BBC.

== Overview ==
Notable productions include BBC Daytime anthology drama series Moving On (since 2009), which is one of the channel's second longest-running drama series and filmed its eleventh series in June 2019. Moving On is story-edited by Jimmy McGovern.

Common (BBC1, 2014), written by Jimmy McGovern, explored the flaws in the UK's "joint enterprise" law and starred Nico Mirallegro and Jodhi May. The single drama was nominated for an International Emmy in 2015.

Reg (BBC1 2016), also written by McGovern, with Robert Pugh, told the story of Reg Keys; the father of Tom Keys, one of the six 'Redcaps' murdered in an ambush in Afghanistan in 2003. Keys was instrumental in challenging the legality of then-PM Tony Blair's decision to enter the Iraq Campaign. Keys ended up standing against Blair in the Sedgefield seat at the 2005 United Kingdom general election. The drama was Emmy-nominated in 2018. Reg Keys was played by Tim Roth.

In 2017, LA Productions and Jimmy McGovern collaborated once more, this time on the BBC1 6-part drama series Broken, starring Sean Bean, Adrian Dunbar and Anna Friel, which told the story of conflicted Catholic priest, Father Michael Kerrigan (Bean) and his daily struggles to look after his parish and cope with his dying mother. Many critics consider the series McGovern's most personal work to date.

In 2018, Channel 5Star commissioned its first original drama series, Clink, through LA Productions. The 10-part drama, set in a British female prison, was conceived, created, written, filmed and post-produced in just ten months and transmitted between 18 April – 20 June 2019.

Single drama, Care (BBC One, 2018) starred Sheridan Smith, Alison Steadman and Sinead Keenan and told the story of two sisters' battle to secure NHS Continuing Healthcare for their sick mother. Written by Jimmy McGovern and Gillian Juckes, Care was nominated for a television BAFTA Award in the Best Single Drama category in 2019, and was the recipient of the prestigious Monaco Red Cross Special Prize at the 59th Monaco International Television Festival, personally chosen by Prince Albert II of Monaco.

== Other divisions ==
LA Factual is the company's documentary arm, which produced And The Beat Goes On: The Story Of The Cavern Club (2019), which was selected to headline the Newport Beach International Film Festival in 2019.

LA International is the dedicated distribution partner of LA's entire portfolio.

== Filmography ==
- Granite Harbour (BBC Scotland and BBC One, 2022)
- Compulsion (Channel 5, 2021)
- Anthony (BBC One, 2020)
- Clink (5Star, 2019)
- Pitching In (BBC Cymru Wales and BBC One, 2019)
- Care (BBC One, 2018)
- Broken (BBC One, 2017)
- Reg (BBC One, 2016)
- Common (BBC One, 2014)
- Stepping Up (CBBC, 2012)
- Secrets and Words (BBC One, 2012)
- Justice (BBC One, 2011)
- The Swimming Man (2011)
- Dear Mr Hicks (2010)
- Senseless (2010)
- Moving On (BBC One, 2009–present)
- Adrift (2005)
- Flight (2005)
- Boys Don't Cry 2005 (2005)
- Ring a King (2004)
- 90 Second Minute (2004)
- Holy Cross (2003) (TV)
- Run Piglet Run (2003)
- Unhinged (2002)
