= New Orleans Jazz =

New Orleans Jazz may refer to:

- Dixieland jazz, a style of jazz music (New Orleans jazz)
- Music of New Orleans § Jazz
- New Orleans Jazz (NBA team), professional basketball team that relocated and became the Utah Jazz
- New Orleans Jazz football club, an American football team in the Stars Football League
- New Orleans Jazz National Historical Park
