= Reg Keys =

British politician (born 1952)

Reginald Thomas Keys (born 1952) is the father of a British serviceman killed in the Iraq War. He stood in the 2005 general election as an anti-war independent candidate for in Sedgefield, a constituency represented by the then Prime Minister Tony Blair.

== Biography ==
Keys is a founder member of the campaign group Military Families Against the War. His son, Lance Corporal Tom Keys, was one of six Royal Military Policemen killed by an Iraqi mob in Majar al-Kabir in June 2003. Keys was an ambulance paramedic for 19 years in Solihull before retiring to Llanuwchllyn, Bala, in North Wales. In the 2005 general election, he stood against the then Prime Minister, Tony Blair, in the Sedgefield constituency.

Keys declared at the outset of the campaign that he had been a Labour Party voter and was still a socialist but that he was seeking election as a candidate opposed to Blair's policy on the Iraq War. His position was that by electing him, voters could keep the Labour Party in power but with Gordon Brown as the likely Prime Minister rather than Blair. Former Independent MP Martin Bell urged the other parties to withdraw their candidates as removing a supporter of the war from office would send a message to United States president George W. Bush and other world leaders who had supported him. During the campaign, The Guardian's Stuart Jeffries asked Keys, "Is it difficult to be a political candidate in these circumstances, when you are still clearly grieving?", to which he replied "Yes it is. ... I feel, though, that I have a responsibility to Tom. I keep going back to the words of a widow of a man who died on the Kursk ... . She said: 'If you betray your country you are a traitor and you will go to prison. But if your country betrays you, what can you do?' I think I have an answer to that: we can use our vote to get rid of those people who betrayed my son and other men like him. That's what I want the people of Sedgefield to do."

Keys won 4,252 votes (10.3%), whilst Blair won 24,421 votes (58.9%). At the declaration, Keys made a widely publicised speech about the controversy over the decision to go to war and the alleged deceptions made by Blair over the reasons for going to war. Blair listened to the speech with an expressionless face. Reviewing the 2005 election's most memorable moments the BBC noted:

Independent Reg Keys polled 10% of the vote in Tony Blair's Sedgefield constituency on an anti-war ticket. But it was his moving lament for the son he lost in Iraq that will linger in the memory – not for Mr Keys' words necessarily, although these were powerful enough, but for Tony Blair's expression as he listened to them. 'I hope in my heart that one day the prime minister will be able to say sorry, that one day he will say sorry to the families of the bereaved,' said Mr Keys. Mr Blair's attempt to look impassive and expressionless will, inevitably, be replayed time and again whenever the story of his premiership is told on television.

In 2015, the BBC announced that it was to produce a biographical drama film about Keys' life called Reg. In the film, broadcast on 6 June 2016, Keys was portrayed by Academy Award-nominated actor Tim Roth. It was directed by David Blair from a script by Jimmy McGovern and Robert Pugh.

== Spectre ==
In August 2006, Keys and other relatives of military personnel killed in Iraq announced the creation of a new political party named Spectre. The party's aims and objectives included bringing the government to account for misleading Parliament over Iraq, supporting wounded troops returning from Iraq, raising serving soldiers' concerns over Iraq, and highlight equipment and system failures. At the launch, it was stated that the party planned to contest more than 70 constituencies then represented by pro-war Labour MPs, including foreign secretary Margaret Beckett, Ruth Kelly, the communities and local government secretary and Jack Straw, leader of the Commons. Keys also aimed to stand candidates in parliamentary by-elections. Spectre was never registered as a political party with the Electoral Commission, and did not contest any by-elections or any seat at the 2010 general election.

== See also ==
- 2005 United Kingdom general election
