= Moving On (TV series) =

British television series

- Also known as: Jimmy McGovern's Moving On
- Genre: Drama
- Created by: Jimmy McGovern
- Written by: Various
- Directed by: Various
- Starring: Various
- Composer: Steve Wright
- Country of origin: United Kingdom
- Original language: English
- No. of series: 12
- No. of episodes: 65 (list of episodes)

Production
- Executive producers: Jimmy McGovern; Colin McKeown; Liam Keelan; Damian Kavanagh; Callum Langley; Bethany Dillon
- Producers: Colin McKeown; Donna Molloy
- Production location: Liverpool
- Cinematography: Len Gowing
- Editor: Patrick Hall
- Camera setup: Single-camera
- Running time: 45 minutes
- Production company: LA Productions

Original release
- Network: BBC One
- Release: 18 May 2009 – 12 March 2021

Moving On is a British anthology television series, created and executive produced by Jimmy McGovern, which consists of a series of standalone contemporary dramas, each focusing on a pivotal turning point in the life of one or more of the characters in the featured episode. The first episode aired on BBC One on 18 May 2009, and since, a total of 65 episodes have been broadcast. As of 2023, there has been no confirmation of a thirteenth series and the show has presumably ended.

== History ==
The series was created by screenwriter Jimmy McGovern, known for his works on series such as Cracker and The Lakes; however, it was notable for being his first project for daytime television. A single series of five episodes was commissioned by the network, with guest stars in this series including Sheila Hancock, Lesley Sharp, Richard Armitage, Dervla Kirwan, Joanne Froggatt and Ian Hart. Although originally broadcast in an early-afternoon slot, less than a month after their initial airing, the series was repeated to an evening audience, at 10:35pm on Sundays. The reception was good enough for a second series to be commissioned. This series was extended to ten episodes.

A third series was subsequently commissioned, with filming set to commence in January 2011, with a broadcast to follow in the Autumn of that year. Reece Dinsdale, Christine Bottomley, Dean Lennox Kelly, Paul Usher and Eva Pope were subsequently confirmed as guest stars for this series. A fourth series swiftly followed, filming during the summer of 2012 for broadcast that November; however, due to unforeseen filming complications, broadcast was delayed until January 2013, becoming the first series to air outside of its regular November time slot. Series five followed in November 2013, with all five episodes being released on BBC iPlayer as a box set prior to broadcast, making it the first BBC television drama series to be released in this way.

Series six and seven were commissioned together following the success of series five. Series seven was the first to be broadcast in the series new early spring time slot, airing across the final week of February 2016. Series eight began filming in July 2016, and broadcast earlier than expected, arriving in November 2016. This became the first series not to be broadcast across a single week, after 'Burden', the series' third episode, was removed from schedules on 9 November 2016 to accommodate ongoing coverage of Donald Trump's election as President of the United States. Series nine saw the series return to its late winter/early spring time slot, airing during the first week of February 2018. Series ten, which was filmed during March and April 2018, followed in February 2019. The series was renewed for an eleventh and twelfth series, airing in 2020 and 2021 respectively.

== Episodes ==
Series	Episodes	Originally released	
Series	Episodes	First released	Last released
1	5	18 May 2009	22 May 2009
2	10	1 November 2010	12 November 2010
3	5	14 November 2011	18 November 2011
4	5	28 January 2013	1 February 2013
5	5	11 November 2013	15 November 2013
6	5	10 November 2014	14 November 2014
7	5	22 February 2016	26 February 2016
8	5	7 November 2016	14 November 2016
9	5	5 February 2018	9 February 2018
10	5	4 February 2019	8 February 2019
11	5	2 March 2020	6 March 2020
12	5	8 March 2021	12 March 2021
