= Casualty series 40 =

Series 40 of Casualty

Casualty
- Series 40
- Starring: Jasmine Bayes; William Beck; Di Botcher; Anna Chell; Milo Clarke; Sammy T. Dobson; Melanie Hill; Aron Julius; Elinor Lawless; Kirsty Mitchell; Neet Mohan; Adesuwa Oni; Olly Rix; Sarah Seggari; Michael Stevenson; Charles Venn; Naomi Wakszlak; Barney Walsh
- No. of episodes: 34

Release
- Original network: BBC One; BBC One HD
- Original release: 2 August 2025 – 5 September 2026

Series chronology
- ← Previous; Series 39 Next → Series 41

The fortieth series of the British medical drama television series Casualty commenced airing in the United Kingdom on BBC One on 2 August 2025 and concluded on 5 September 2026. The series focuses on the professional and personal lives of medical and ancillary staff at the emergency department (ED) of the fictional Holby City Hospital. Roxanne Harvey serves as executive producer, while Liza Mellody continued as series producer. The series starts with the second half of the mini-series Supply and Demand followed by Learning Curve, Lethal Legacy and concludes with the 40th anniversary episodes.

== Production ==
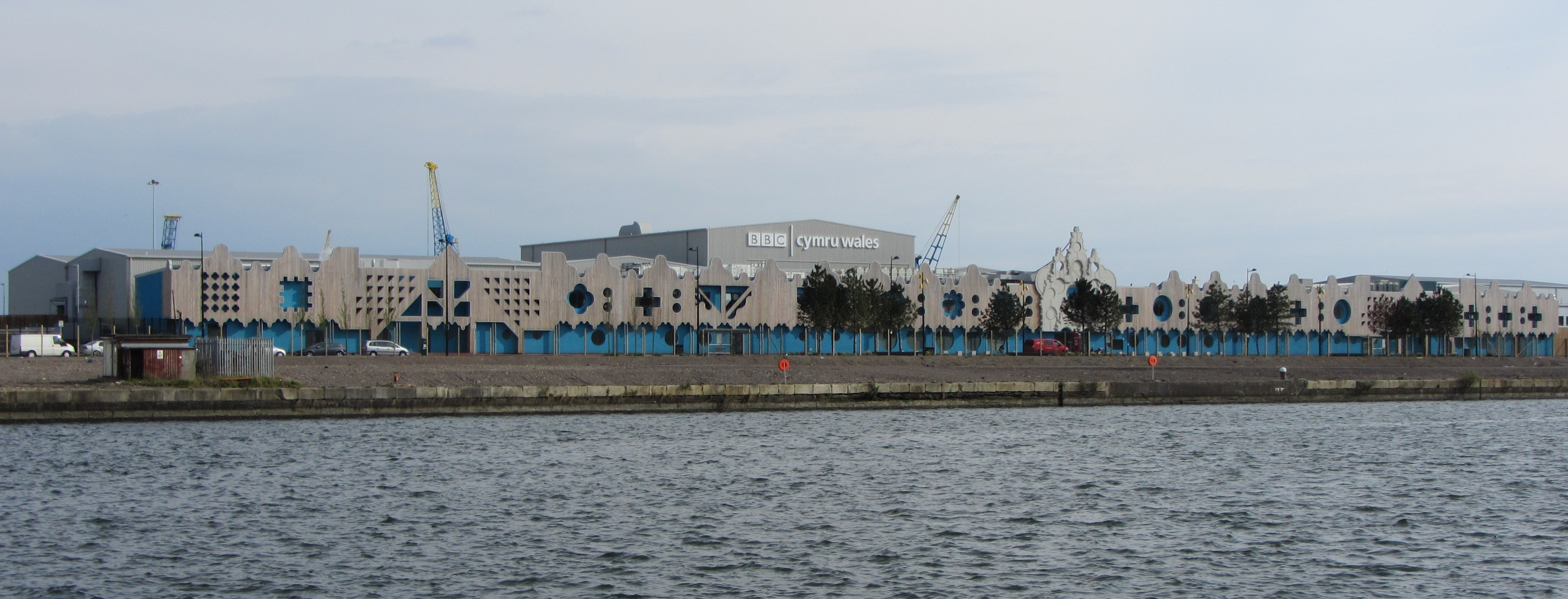
Series 40 is primarily filmed at Roath Lock Studios, located in Cardiff, where the serial has been produced since 2011.

The series airs on BBC One. Series 40 was the final series under BBC Studios' production contract, with production companies invited to tender for three subsequent years in May 2025. From series 41, Roath Lock Studios will remain as the production base for Casualty, but the series' fictional setting will move from Holby to a hospital in Wales. BBC Studios successfully bid to continue as the production company for the next three series.

The series begins with the fifth episode of the mini-series Supply and Demand, following which the show went on its regular autumn break. On 3 October 2025, the next mini-series titled Learning Curve, consisting of twelve episodes was announced, introducing two new resident doctors to the cast. The series returned on 10 January 2026 following its usual winter break. The mini-series Lethal Legacy introduces a storyline in which an unexplained virus places unprecedented strain on the emergency department. In episode 12 of Lethal Legacy, an air ambulance features in part of the storyline. The Eurocopter EC135 T2+ aircraft belonging to Great Western Air Ambulance Charity was used with filming taking place on the Bristol Royal Infirmary helideck and at a playing field in Horfield.

To celebrate the shows 40th anniversary, a special two-part episode aired on 5 September 2026. A teaser trailer released on 12 August 2026 revealed that an explosion takes place at St James' Hospital leaving the Holby team to deal with the fallout. It was filmed across South Wales, Bristol and the underwater stage at Pinewood Studios for a stunt involving an ambulance that crashes into a quarry.

== Cast ==
The fortieth series of Casualty features a cast of characters working for the NHS within the emergency department of Holby City Hospital and the Holby Ambulance Service. Sixteen main characters returned from the previous series.

William Beck appears as Dylan Keogh, a consultant in emergency medicine with Di Botcher portraying Jan Jenning, the operational duty manager at Holby Ambulance Service. Anna Chell stars as staff nurse and midwife Jodie Whyte with Milo Clarke playing paramedic Teddy Gowan. Sammy T. Dobson continues as junior doctor Nicole Piper with Melanie Hill portraying clinical nurse manager Siobhan McKenzie. Elinor Lawless stars as consultant Stevie Nash with Kirsty Mitchell portraying Faith Cadogan, an advanced clinical practitioner (ACP). Neet Mohan appears as Rash Masum, a clinical fellow whilst Adesuwa Oni and Sarah Seggari continue as staff nurses Ngozi Okoye and Rida Amaan. Olly Rix stars as clinical lead Flynn Byron with Michael Stevenson and Charles Venn as paramedics Iain Dean and Jacob Masters respectively. Naomi Wakszlak plays trainee paramedic Indie Jankowski with Barney Walsh as staff nurse Cameron Mickelthwaite.

Supply and Demand concludes with a cliffhanger, where the team attempt to save the life of Ngozi following her relapse into alcoholism. Although the character survived, her relapse led to her departure in the second episode of Learning Curve.

Aron Julius and Jasmine Bayes join the cast from episode 9, the start of Learning Curve as resident doctors Matty Linlaker and Kim Chang. Bayes left the show in episode 20 after her character Kim, who had been battling Anorexia nervosa, died on-screen.

The first episode of Lethal Legacy sees Mark Womack introduced as Colonel Jack Bard, an Army officer linked to Flynn's past. Phina Oruche also debuts as Matty's mother and Dylan's former love interest Sarah Linlaker.

The BBC confirmed the return of actors Derek Thompson and George Rainsford as retired senior charge nurse Charlie Fairhead and locum consultant Ethan Hardy for the 40th anniversary special episodes. Kellie Shirley, who played psychiatric liaison nurse Sophia Peters in series 38 and 39 also returned for one episode.

=== Main characters ===
- William Beck as Dylan Keogh
- Di Botcher as Jan Jenning
- Anna Chell as Jodie Whyte
- Milo Clarke as Teddy Gowan
- Sammy T. Dobson as Nicole Piper
- Melanie Hill as Siobhan McKenzie
- Elinor Lawless as Stevie Nash
- Kirsty Mitchell as Faith Dean
- Neet Mohan as Rash Masum
- Adesuwa Oni as Ngozi Okoye (until episode 10)
- Olly Rix as Flynn Byron
- Sarah Seggari as Rida Amaan
- Michael Stevenson as Iain Dean
- Charles Venn as Jacob Masters
- Naomi Wakszlak as Indie Jankowski
- Barney Walsh as Cameron Mickelthwaite
- Jasmine Bayes as Kim Chang (episodes 9–20)
- Aron Julius as Matty Linlaker (from episode 9)

=== Recurring characters ===
- Jamie Marie Leary as Sunny Callahan (until episode 7)
- Charlie Ann Upton as Cassie Woods (until episode 6)
- Aryel Tsoto as Obina "Obi" Okoye (episodes 3–8)
- Hannah Traylen as PC Ashley Sullivan (episodes 10–17)
- Cai Brigden as Chris Banfield (episodes 11–19)
- David Ajayi as Blake Gardner (episode 14)
- Katie Redford as Laura Beech (episodes 21–31)
- Mark Womack as Colonel Jack Bard (episodes 21–32)
- Gwion Morris Jones as Rory Dickson (episodes 21–29)
- Jamila Wingett as Jessica Priceman (episodes 21–30)
- Ellie Spooner as Penny Sanders (episodes 25–32)
- Janet Etuk as Kirsty Osborne (episodes 27–29)
- Aita Mushuku as Ivy Osborne (episodes 27–29)

=== Guest characters ===
- Luke Azille as Arlo Martin (episode 1)
- Tai Hilferink as Badger (episodes 1–2)
- Ross Waiton as Tim Matthews (episodes 3, 7–8)
- Gabriel Goulding as Jake Callahan (episodes 4–7)
- Kirsty Armstrong as Vicky Woods (episodes 5–6)
- Bill Fellows as Terry Melville (episode 5)
- Paksie Vernon as Lauren Maddox (episodes 5–6)
- Sharon Percy as Tina Piper (episode 6)
- San Shella as DCI Ahwalia (episodes 7–8)
- Israel J. Fredericks as Joel Hannigan (episode 7)
- Lizzie Wilde as Cleo Hainey (episode 8)
- Lola Grace Maurice as Millie Byron (episodes 8, 33–34)
- Gwyneth Strong as Ceri Mayland (episodes 11, 15 & 19)
- Morgan James as Bryn Ellis (episodes 12 & 16)
- Richard Dempsey as Thomas Delaware (episodes 12 & 16)
- Derek Griffiths as Leon Powell (episode 12)
- Georgia Mackenzie as Fiona Shaw (episode 12)
- Kyla Frye as DI Zara Hughes (episodes 14–16 & 18)
- Tom Mulheron as Luka Malinovsky (episode 20)
- Joe Hughes as Joel Beech (episodes 21–22)
- Eileen O'Brien as Beryl Rice (episodes 21–23)
- Phina Oruche as Sarah Linlaker (episode 21)
- Christopher Timothy as Alan Gibson (episodes 21–25)
- Bethzienna Williams as Emilia Gold (episodes 23–24)
- Louise A. Willoughby as Rachel Heaney (episodes 24–25)
- Elisabeth Hopper as Claire Byron (episodes 26 and 34)
- Rhys ap William as Greg "Rex" Rexford (episodes 27–28)
- Elsie Antonia Maurice as Poppy Byron (episodes 33–34)
- Kellie Shirley as Sophia Peters (episode 33)
- Derek Thompson as Charlie Fairhead (episode 34)
- George Rainsford as Ethan Hardy (episode 34)

== Episodes ==
No. overall	No. in series	Title	Directed by	Written by	Original release date	UK viewers (millions)
Supply and Demand
1370	1	"Episode 5"	Conor Morrissey	Rachel Harper	2 August 2025	2.98
Indie's last shift sees her accompany Teddy to a house where a disturbance has been reported. Getting in through a window, she finds a woman who has lost her clozapine and is having a mental health crisis after being spooked by the noises from the pipes. Indie is able to calm her down. Arlo, who lost his girlfriend weeks earlier after she took tainted drugs, claims he is clean but the staff are suspicious when he claims to be in pain. When an injured dog walker is also in more pain that she should be, Faith suspects patients are being told they've been given morphine by paramedics when they haven't. Cassie brings in a friend, Steph, who has taken drugs. Nicole realises Cassie is dealing and takes her supply, but she goes back to the dealers, even after learning they have been forcing Steph to sleep with men. Siobhan looks after an underage student with a head injury who later dies after Stevie realises he and other teens have taken contaminated ecstasy. Rash messes up booking a show for him and Sunny. Rida suggests they accompany the nurses clubbing but they end up going back to Sunny's instead. Indie meets an old friend, Badger, at the club who offers the group pills. Rida, Teddy and Jodie take a young man they found collapsed to the hospital. Siobhan realises Teddy and Jodie took the pills and insists they stay in for observation. Teddy is unable to get hold of Indie and Badger. Guest starring Bryony Miller, Evie McGuire and Krrish Patel
1371	2	"Episode 6"	Conor Morrissey	Isla Gray	9 August 2025	2.98
Indie wakes up in Badger's flat and finds him unconscious after taking one of the pills. She look after him until Iain and Teddy arrive and he is taken to ICU. Jan suggests Indie apply for a vacancy at Holby. A man is brought in with stab wounds and a head injury. His wife claims he was attacked by an intruder but both she and her young son let slip that she argued with him beforehand. After he dies in Resus, Nicole realises the wife is on drugs and she admits she attacked him when he tried to take their son and leave. Nicole supports Cassie at Maggie's funeral and convinces her to come and stay with her. Dylan makes a number of proposals including an amnesty where drugs can be handed in to be destroyed. After he admits cannabis could help a Parkinson's patient, Flynn relaxes his attitude and supports the idea. Iain and Teddy are called out to the home of a cancer patient who has died. Iain is suspicious of Teddy when the patient's daughter finds his morphine is missing but it turns out the patient took it himself, leaving a suicide note. Teddy has however taken some of his medication after his heart medication ran out and Iain tells him to hand it in at the pharmacy. Jacob asks to borrow money from Iain. When another of Jacob's patients hasn't been given morphine and Flynn reveals hospital grade morphine has been found on the streets, Faith wants Iain to tell Jan. Guest starring Polly Maberly, Rafe Harwood and Emily Aston
1372	3	"Episode 7"	Matthew Evans	Simon Norman	16 August 2025	2.82
A young woman is brought in after jumping out of a window for a bet while high on ketamine. Cam has to put a catheter in and Rida arranges a chaperone but he continues after she is called away, leading to the patient accusing him of sexual assault. Siobhan chides Rida for not supporting Cam. The patient later withdraws her complaint and it turns out the ketamine has caused bladder problems. Cam had agreed to have a drink with Indie but heads home instead. Jacob and Teddy are called out to a swimming pool to treat Sandra, an older woman with breathing problems. Teddy realises there is a chlorine leak and has the place evacuated. Sandra is taken to hospital but dies. Alex, a lifeguard who accompanied her, realises he knows nothing about her family despite speaking to her regularly. Iain and Tim arrive with HART and learns a staffmember is missing along with a young girl whose stepmother Shelly was organising a birthday party for her. Iain and a partner rescue the staffmember but Iain goes back for the girl against orders and they both have to be rescued. Shelly reflects on how she was only married to the girl's father for two years before he died. Nicole and Ngozi look after a new mother with an infected caesarean scar and realise the baby has cateracts. Obi tells Ngozi he is home alone all the time and wants to go back to Nigeria. Flynn tries to get away to meet someone at 4.30 but arrives at the cemetery to find them gone. Iain confronts Jacob about the drugs and he reveals he has taken a second job selling pizzas to buy Blake's meds. Faith reports him to Jan anyway. Guest starring Emma Noakes, Jack Weise and Siobhan Redmond
1373	4	"Episode 8"	Phoebe Barran	Poz Watson	23 August 2025	2.83
Nicole has arranged for Cassie to stay with a friend in Newcastle and leaves her alone while she goes into work. With Jacob on administrative duties, the other paramedics are called out to a multi-storey car park where a young motorcyclist, Fraser, has become trapped under a car. Even though Iain gives him two doses of morphine, he is still in pain when he is dragged clear. Teddy finds Cassie with a head injury nearby. Nicole realises Fraser was coerced into deliberately running her over. Cassie is rushed into theatre with a subdural hematoma. Rash and Rida treat a woman with an infected burn. She admits she left her family behind to go on holiday with friends and fell asleep next to a hot cyclinder. Sunny advises Rash on medication. Ngozi gets frustrated with a man with heart problems who is desperate to get back to work, pointing out none of his colleagues have asked after him and saying he needs to find a life outside work. She tells first Obi and then Nicole that they will go back to Nigeria. Nicole tells her that her mother put her in care at four. She asks social services for details of Cassie's parents and also her own file. Rash arranges to meet Sunny's son Jake. Iain finds evidence that the morphine issued to the paramedics is fake. It is revealed that Sunny is replacing it with saline. Guest starring Ben Skym, Scarlett Brookes and Gruffudd Glyn
1374	5	"Episode 9"	Judith Dine	Mark Catley	30 August 2025	2.89
Jan tells Sunny about the fake morphine. Iain and Teddy bring in a patient who is showing signs of an overdose but has actually been stung by a scorpion, who is found in the ambulance. Sunny gets the dosage wrong for the anti-venom but it is corrected. The patient suspects the scorpion was in a box of shoes she bought from China. Flynn treats a pregnant woman for gastroenteritis. When her husband turns up, the woman's friend tells Flynn she left him after he was violent towards her. Flynn stalls the husband so the pair can leave, then learns she walked out on him without explanation, emptying their bank accounts. Faith convinces Iain to attend couple's counselling but he just goes through the motions. Cassie's mother Vicky turns up and Nicole argues with her, leading to ICU head Lauren Maddox banning Nicole. Ngozi helps Nicole track down her mother Tina. Sunny admits to Rash that dealers bought Jake presents and then threatened him if she didn't supply them with drugs. She tips them off to steal a delivery being transported by security guard Terry, which leads to Terry being dragged under a vehicle. Rash and Jan tell the police and Sunny is arrested. Guest starring Bill Fellows, Amy Du Quesne and Hemma Gulhane
1375	6	"Episode 10"	Judith Dine	Michelle Lipton	6 September 2025	2.77
Nicole goes to Tina's house in Newcastle and is initially mistaken for a district nurse; Tina's mother Ruth had a stroke. Nicole eventually admits the truth and Tina throws her out. She comes back the next day and explains Nicole's father was violent and she was left with no support after he died in a motorbike accident. She ended up in a diabetic coma, woke up a month later to find Nicole was in care and never took her back. Her "mother" is actually her mother-in-law; she is married with three sons. Nicole decides against staying in contact. Holby receives another influx of patients who have taken contaminated drugs. A reporter highlights Cassie being a drug dealer, leading to the mother of one of the patients arguing with Vicky. Tests show Cassie is brain dead but Flynn opposes turning off life support. Dylan learns he feels guilty for convincing Claire to withdraw life support from their infant son and convinces him the case is different. Nicole arrives back in time to see life support turned off. Rash visits Sunny in prison but she refuses to give the police any information, worried about retribution against Jake. Guest starring Sharon Percy, Carol Ball and Mali Ann Rees
1376	7	"Episode 11"	Paul Murphy	Claire Miller	13 September 2025	2.82
Iain accompanies ambulance crews to the court house where both Sunny and her lawyer, Mei, have been shot. Rash insists on leading the team treating Sunny, who has internal bleeding into her lung. Jake visits with his aunt Danique, blaming Rash. Sunny insists on giving a statement to DCI Ahwalia before surgery, giving him the name of the man who shot her and attacked Terry and the location of a burner phone. She is later reported to be recovering. Joel Hannigan is brought in with an infected abscess; he was allowed to remain undercover after Ngozi nearly exposed him but is taking drugs and shows more loyalty to the gang than the police. Flynn and Ahwalia fail to talk him round. A young man is brought in with ethanol poisoning after drinking poorly made home brew. Ngozi gives him brandy to control the symptoms until he can be given the antidote. Nicole learns it is Ngozi's last day and fails to turn up to her farewell, where Cam and Indie kiss. Iain hears his mother has died, telling Stevie but not Faith. Three days later, Iain and Tim meet with Ahwalia to accompany him in raiding the home of Duncan Yates, the head of the drug operation. Guest starring Kirsten Foster, Risha Silvera and Alex Farrell
1377	8	"Episode 12"	Paul Murphy	Erin Kubicki	20 September 2025	3.03
The police raid sees Yates' nephew Bradley having his arm cut off when he tries to stop them cutting the door down. Iain and Tim look after Yates' wife Imogen when she has an angina attack but Iain leaves Tim to investigate a crying baby only to find it's a toy, with Tim being stabbed by Yates in a failed escape attempt. He recovers in hospital. Stevie tells Faith about Iain's mother. Iain suggests he's only with Faith because he wanted to fix her. Flynn looks after a schoolgirl who fell off a chair while drunk. He has a liaison with her mother and misses the fact the girl has a bleed on the brain, with her needing emergency treatment. He admits to Dylan that using sex to cope is unhealthy and phones Millie. Cleo Hainey goes into labour, having got off the drugs, and Rash, Nicole and Jodie deliver a baby girl. She decides to keep the baby, naming her Judy after mishearing Jodie's name. Nicole decides to go to the airport to say goodbye to Ngozi and Obi, with Siobhan driving her, but arrives to find Ngozi has been drinking heavily, fallen after choking and suffered a severe head injury. She is rushed to hospital where staff try and revive her. Guest starring Natasha Atkinson, Dan Richards and Lauren Cornelius
Learning Curve
1378	9	"Episode 1"	Seán Healy	Toby Walton	10 January 2026	<2.87
Resident doctors Matty Linlaker and Kim Chang join the team. Dylan refuses to act as mentor so Matty is assigned to Flynn and Kim to Stevie. A number of casualties are brought in from a fire at a wedding. The groom has severe burns while the bride has been trampled and is arguing with her daughter. Matty fakes a failed attempt to reconcile them. Kim treats a young pregnant woman bitten by a dog and twice hits the alarm for help with minor problems but later diagnoses her with scurvy caused by poor diet. She also treats a woman with sunburn who tans to make herself feel better. Faith tells Stevie that Iain has moved out. Dylan admits to Stevie that he dated a Sarah Linlaker at medical school around the time Matty was conceived. Stevie quizzes Matty about his background and learns his mother is called Sarah and dropped out of med school when she fell pregnant with him. Kim takes over Ngozi's locker and initially thinks she's dead until Nicole shows a video call with her. Matty befriends Claude, a homeless man with breathing difficulties. Claude doesn't appear when called and Matty later finds him collapsed, failing to resuscitate him. He makes an anonymous report to the CQC criticising the department. Guest starring Amy Blake, Geoff Aymer and Madelyn Smedley
1379	10	"Episode 2"	Seán Healy	Poz Watson	17 January 2026	<2.71
A school roof has collapsed, leading to multiple casualties. Teddy and Jacob are among the first on the scene and Teddy convinces PC Ashley Sullivan to let him take charge, finding three of the missing casualties. A boy at the hospital, Freddie, is reunited with his friend Xavier, who Flynn finds has swallowed a mass of hair and was being bullied by a missing student, Mari. Xavier admits he saw where Mari went and she is found badly injured. Freddie cuts ties with Xavier. Stevie and Kim go to the scene to look after a younger student, Oscar, who is trapped. Kim ends up trapped with him and Stevie has to talk her through performing a finger thoracostomy. Faith finds a teacher has a girl's passport and suspects he was trying to run away with her. In fact, he was sending her to an aunt in Spain to get her away from an abusive relationship. Siobhan suspects Faith is menopausal but tests show she is actually pregnant. Nicole collects Ngozi from rehab and drives her to her new job in Bournemouth (Obi is back in Nigeria) where they say their goodbyes. Matty learns the staff are having a collection for Claude and withdraws his complaint. Ashley invites Teddy for a drink. Dylan sees Matty discard a mouth swab and purloins it for a DNA test. Guest starring Dino Luca, Harvey Weedon and Benjamin Chivers
1380	11	"Episode 3"	Jamie Annett	Michelle Lipton	24 January 2026	2.96
Ceri Mayland from the CQC turns up to do a spot inspection. Teddy and Jacob are called out to a flat where a woman is suffering a mental health crisis. Her teenage son falls down some steps chasing the ambulance and needs to be taken to hospital. Ashley arrives and coaxes the woman outside so she can be sectioned but she runs off on seeing her son being taken to an ambulance. Ashley chases her and Teddy finds she has tripped and impaled herself. She is rushed to hospital while the woman ends up at the police station. Afterwards, Ashley agrees to be Teddy's girlfriend. Flynn insists Dylan mentor Matty; Dylan admits to Stevie that the test confirmed he is Matty's father. A man having a heart attack is brought in handcuffed to a sex worker and Matty is sent to get bolt cutters to free him. X-rays are down, delaying treatment of Chris Banfield for a minor cut. A childminder brings in a group of children, one of whom has swallowed a battery. Kim tries to use a metal detector to finds out which one. A boy is found choking and Ceri, a former nurse, helps treat him. She tells Flynn there will have to be a full inspection. Siobhan offers to stay back and do paperwork while Flynn goes to Poppy's birthday. She is attacked while walking home. Guest starring Aoife Dunne, Marie Blount and Iona Champain
1381	12	"Episode 4"	Jamie Annett	Claire Miller	31 January 2026	3.10
Siobhan heads to SARC to have forensic evidence of her rape gathered and decides to report it to the police. She returns to work and privately tells Flynn what has happened. Casualties are brought in after a car drove into a block of flats. One of the residents dies in hospital and it is suspected that the driver, who has previously attempted suicide, did it deliberately, with him unable to remember what happened. Dylan and Matty separately work out that he passed out at the wheel because of cough syncope. Another of those injured is out on license with an ankle tag and learns he may have to return to prison if his injury means he can't keep it. Dylan considers telling Matty he's his father but changes his mind on learning he gets on well with his stepfather and was told his father was an unreliable alcoholic. Cam asks Indie to be his girlfriend. Faith tells Iain about her pregnancy and that she's going to have an abortion but a scan shows she is further along than she believed. Kim annoys Stevie by getting a cannula wrong. They later treat Bryn, a man who has shot himself in the foot with a nail gun. Kim suspects his boyfriend Thomas is abusing him. Stevie and Kim talk to Bryn who admits Thomas has isolated him from his family. Stevie takes Kim out for a meal but afterwards Kim makes herself sick in the toilet. Guest starring Georgia Mackenzie, Michael Starke and Derek Griffiths
1382	13	"Episode 5"	Cóilín Ó Scolaí	Isla Gray	7 February 2026	2.93
Flynn organises a training exercise with his friend Grace, in which Matty and Kim pretend to be treating her for a pathogen. Matty doesn't take it seriously and refuses to wear PPE, but Grace throws up blood over him and it appears she may actually have been infected with a pathogen. Flynn learns she hasn't and actually has internal bleeding from taking interferons, but delays telling Matty to teach him a lesson. Dylan is furious and slams Flynn against a wall. Dylan and Jodie meet an elderly woman, Eileen, and her girlfriend Alba; Eileen swallowed a ring when Alba tried to propose and is reluctant to admit they're a couple, with them only having got together when they ended up in the same sheltered housing, but ends up proposing herself. Jan takes a call from a very young boy whose father has collapsed and Iain and Jacob are able to follow his clues and find the right house; the father is an epileptic who has recently changed medication. Faith comforts a teenage girl who has dislocated her collar bone playing rugby. Siobhan treats a young woman with muscular dystrophy who has pneumonia and will soon need a feeding tube and be unable to speak. Siobhan is unable to support her and Flynn advises her to get counselling. Jan collects Ashley from hospital and gets her to scare a group of teens making hoax calls. Iain asks to get back with Faith but she feels he's only doing it for the baby. After confiding in Stevie, she goes to Jacob's looking for Iain but he is out hooking up with a woman he met in a bar. Guest starring Poppy Roe, Aiyana Bartlett and Henry Anders
1383	14	"Episode 6"	Mingyu Lin	Amy Guyler	14 February 2026	2.80
Jacob, Teddy and Ashley are called out to an overturned car in the woods and find a young man wandering around in a daze with a tree branch in his neck and a teenage girl unconscious in the boot. They are taken to the hospital where it is assumed the man kidnapped the girl. He dies in Resus from a head injury. When the girl comes round, she reveals he is her brother and she hid in the boot to join him at a concert; she realises she caused the crash by making a noise and startling him. The staff learn of Faith's pregnancy. She tells Iain she wants to try again and he tells her about sleeping with someone else. Matty treats a man with Down's syndrome who has been mugged. He gets a description of the mugger from another patient and informs the police. The man is visited by his girlfriend but says his wife has arrived to pick him up. Matty sends his girlfriend out after him. Matty wonders why Dylan is impatient with him and Dylan admits he's his father. They decide to ignore it. DI Hughes tells Siobhan there was no forensic evidence of the rape. Siobhan is concerned when a woman brings in her young son who is clearly faking his symptoms. The woman admits they have been evicted and she was trying to find him a bed for the night. Siobhan admits him for observation and calls social services to help. On hearing Cam, Rida and Jodie planning to walk home alone, she tells them about the rape. Ashley stops Blake, who fits the mugger's description. Jacob tries to intervene but she insists on arresting him, leading Jacob to believe she was being racist. Blake is released when the real mugger is caught but is left shaken. Guest starring Tommy Jessop, Nadia Wyn Abouayen and Caleb Mayne
1384	15	"Episode 7"	Conor Morrissey	Poz Watson	28 February 2026	<2.62
When a CQC inspection doesn't turn up, Flynn sends the senior doctors home only for Ceri to arrive late. A traffic warden is brought in after she was dragged under a car during a road rage incident. Teddy and Jacob are called out to a house by a pizza boy worried about the reclusive occupant. The patient turns out to be morbidly obese and to have diabetic complications. At the hospital, he tells Jodie about spending ten years at home caring for his dying mother. She takes him outside but he later suffers a bleed and Dylan has to be called back in to help. He asks Ceri to assist and she reveals she hasn't practised since Covid. Ashley apologises to Jacob, who accepts but intends to go ahead with a complaint. DI Hughes tells Siobhan a suspect has been found who matches the photofit and whose DNA was on her uniform. It turns out to be Chris Banfield, who says the DNA is from when she treated him that day. Kim is feeling dizzy from her purging and asks to team with Matty. They treat Tara, who has a head injury. Matty decides to do a lumbar puncture to test for bleeding and gets Kim to read instructions, but her vision is blurred and she lets him insert the needle too high, causing a clot that leaves Tara paralysed. She needs neurosurgery which may not work. Ceri criticises the lack of consultant cover at night and rules Holby will not receive high risk cases then. Siobhan talks Flynn out of resigning. Guest starring Holly Demaine, Adam Jessop and Esther Coles
1385	16	"Episode 8"	Conor Morrissey	Erin Kubicki	7 March 2026	3.01
The night shift is quiet, with the staff having wheelchair races, and Tina's parents are suing them. Iain and Indie are called out to a frantic mother who has reversed her car into her baby's pram. Iain gets permission from Jan and Stevie to divert to Holby instead of St James but the ambulance breaks down and they have to do an emergency procedure in someone's house and borrow his car to get to hospital. The mother, who had the baby alone via IVF, reaches out to her estranged mother. Dylan and Matty treat a terminal cancer patient who has been working all hours to provide money for his five-year-old son and left him alone. Dylan arranges for a neighbour to bring him in and gives Matty a pep-talk. Stevie suspects Kim is covering for Matty but Kim denies it. Jan ignores an apparent hoax call asking for a pizza. It turns out to be Bryn Ellis, trying to summon help secretly after Richard hit him over the head with a plate. He staggers to hospital and Faith sends Jacob to the house where he finds Richard dead. Bryn is arrested. Rida thinks a patient who seems to be flirting with Rash is a time waster and tries to throw her out but tests show she has had a small heart attack and she explains she was trying to set Rash up with her daughter. Rida learns Flynn has put himself forward for redundancy if the status isn't regained and tells him to put her forward to. Siobhan learns from Hughes that CPS are dropping the case and sees Banfield hanging around the hospital on CCTV to taunt her. She asks Flynn to hurt him for her. Guest starring Jeany Spark, Andrew Senesie and Shameem Ahmad
1386	17	"Episode 9"	Sarah Esdaile	Patrick Homes	14 March 2026	2.67
Siobhan gives Flynn Banfield's details. Matty gets Kim to help out with a patient and she forgets details. He later finds she has gorged herself on cupcakes. A patient, Nia, who reversed into a bollard, appears to be Kim's older mentor but is actually her therapist and knows of her eating disorder. Kim similarly knows Nia is an alcoholic and they agree to keep quiet about each other. Stevie resolves to watch Kim closely, leading her to ask for another mentor. Teddy and Jan meet Joyce, a black woman with COPD who has hit her head. She has been using a personal pulse check but it hasn't been properly calibrated for her skin colour and she has to be admitted. Jacob's complaint against Ashley is dismissed but Teddy breaks up with her after she shows no interest in Joyce's case and just speaks platitudes. A young woman is collected from student halls and turns out to have taken an overdose of prescription medication. Her friend feels guilty since he turned her down when she made a drunken pass. Her mother arrives shortly after she dies and wants the friend to know it wasn't his fault and she has a long history of depression. Siobhan is worried when a man is brought in beaten up and relieved to learn Flynn didn't go after Banfield. Cam finds Banfield's details. Guest starring Sarah Ball, George Usher and Sutara Gayle
1387	18	"Episode 10"	Sarah Esdaile	Toby Walton	21 March 2026	2.68
An elderly woman reports an apparent drunk collapsed in her garden. The ambulances give priority to a bus that has crashed into a low hanging bridge. Among the casualties are a teenage girl being looked after by her widowed father and an elderly couple, Peter and Linda, celebrating their anniversary. Indie hears Peter talking to his wife on the phone. He later admits to Siobhan and Kim that Linda has Alzheimer's and doesn't remember they divorced twenty years ago and he has remarried; their daughter has convinced him to spend time with her behind his wife's back. Linda has to have her leg amputated. Matty and Kim treat a teenage girl who claims to have had an allergic reaction to face cream but turns out to have taken fillers a friend gave her. Matty realises Kim has an eating disorder and she says she'll tell everyone he alerted the CQC if he says anything. The bus driver turns out to have been using weight loss medication which affected his concentration. He gives it to Kim to dispose of but she takes it herself instead. Indie and Teddy finally respond to the man in the garden who turns out to be Cam, who has a head injury and internal bleeding. He tells DI Hughes he ran into Banfield by chance and made a comment that provoked him. Siobhan tells Indie about her rape and Cam tells her about his own abuse. Flynn decides to call the CQC back in. Guest starring Satnam Bhogal, Fenella Norman and David Shaw-Parker
1388	19	"Episode 11"	Karl Neilson	Claire Miller	11 April 2026	2.49
Ceri returns for the final inspection and sends Flynn to his office. A family of four are brought in after being hit by a car. The mother feels guilty that she didn't do more to protect her children. The driver of the car was an escaped prisoner, who says he's being detained indefinitely after being caught carrying a knife seventeen years ago. Siobhan is at the prison to visit Banfield, who is on remand for attacking Cam. She meets Jade and her daughter Marley who are visiting Jade's father Clive for the first time: He was jailed fifteen years ago for killing her mother but has been cleared by DNA evidence and is waiting for an appeal. Visiting is cut short by news of the escape but Clive protests and gets in a struggle with guards. Another prisoner, Jermaine, hits guard Fleur who evacuates the guards. Jermaine stabs fellow prisoner Roland and Siobhan has to treat him until the guards restore order. Clive, Roland and Jermaine are taken to hospital and Siobhan decides to leave without seeing Banfield. Roland reveals he taught Fleur to read and feels betrayed at being left in danger. Matty tells Kim he'll report her to Stevie regardless of blackmail. Kim performs an unsighted pericardiocentesis on Clive but vomits blood in the toilet. She tells Stevie she's withdrawing from the rotation and promises Matty she'll get help. Flynn and Siobhan are prepared to resign but Ceri tells them they've passed. Guest starring Shauna Shim, Amar Chaggar and Jamie Kenna
1389	20	"Episode 12"	Karl Neilson	Michelle Lipton	18 April 2026	2.46
Most of the staff gather for a funeral. Two weeks earlier, Iain and Luka rush Faith into hospital in premature labour. The staff deliver a baby girl but she has to be resuscitated and Faith needs emergency surgery for an inverted uterus. Jacob finds Luka having an asthma attack. Stevie visits her oncologist and learns her pains are the result of scar tissue. Kim's father Wei visits Stevie and explains she has atypical anorexia nervosa. Matty finds Kim coughing up blood at home and finds she has been abusing prescription medication to control her weight. Indie sends Dylan with an air ambulance. Matty blames Stevie. Kim's organs are shutting down and even though Matty intubates her, she dies not long after when an ulcer bursts. After her funeral, Matty accepts a fellowship and resolves to get to know Dylan, while Rash reveals he is doing a rotation in NICU for CERS training. Iain and Faith name their baby Pearl and reunite. Guest starring Dave Wong and Grace Cookey-Gam
Lethal Legacy
1390	21	"Episode 1"	Judith Dine	Erin Kubicki	25 April 2026	2.57
The staff is full of patients with a suspected virus and an army detachment are sent to help with supplies, led by Flynn's old commanding officer Colonel Jack Bard. Dylan and Matty meet with Matty's mum Sarah, who says she didn't tell Dylan of the pregnancy because he came home drunk and covered in blood. Cam is put in charge of a corridor including Beryl, a former nurse with dementia, cancer patient Alan and COPD patient Eileen. A younger patient loses his temper with Beryl, punches her and is ejected. The hospital runs out of oxygen cylinders and Cam gives the last cylinder to Alan, since he might survive and Eileen won't. Siobhan hears Banham was given six months. A pregnant woman, Laura, comes in in premature labour with her husband Joel. Their baby son Zach is delivered and rushed to NICU. A Polish worker is brought in with the same symptoms and Matty works out he is trying to call the woman he loves but fails to alert Stevie of his symptoms. Dylan works out the respiratory problems are down to chemical exposure, not a virus. He makes it public that he is Matty's father. Stevie and Matty argue about Kim and kiss. Guest starring Sarah Crowden, Phina Oruche and Dominic Doughty
1391	22	"Episode 2"	Judith Dine	Poz Watson	2 May 2026	2.51
Rash tells Jessica, the mother of another premature baby, she can go home. Zac goes into respiratory arrest and dies. Laura feels guilty that she drank early in the pregnancy and Rash and Jodie try to comfort her. Teddy is lead paramedic in Iain's absence and planning to meet his father. He brings in a student having a fit and the staff help surgeon Alistair treat her for an intracranial bleed. Joel takes the ambulance control room staff hostage with a knife, wanting to know why their ambulance was diverted when Laura went into labour. New staffmember Kian tries to tackle him and is stabbed in the leg. Jan gets Joel to surrender the knife just before Teddy smashes through the window and tackles him. Joel is arrested. Stevie and Matty decide to forget their night together but then have another liaison in a lift. An elderly woman who tripped while running is brought in and Nicole insists on an x-ray which turns out to be justified. She decides to buy a new development on Wyvern Hill Estate. Rash tells Dylan that several premature babies come from the estate, Faith's mum lives there and Jessica works there. They have a report of an explosion at the estate. Guest starring Wesley Bozonga, Mackenzie Steed and Rajat M. Bose
1392	23	"Episode 3"	George Siougas	Patrick Homes	9 May 2026	2.35
Jacob convinces Jan to let Teddy and Indie attend the site of the explosion. Development manager Emilia insists it wasn't a gas explosion and a marshal, Gary, is found with severe chemical burns over some exposed chemical drums. He is taken to hospital but dies in Resus from a pulmonary embolism. Teddy and Jacob cut crane driver Bohdan free. Nicole admits he will probably lose his arm. Cam learns Beryl has been discharged but her care home won't take her back. While he is trying to make arrangements with social services, she falls, hits her head and dies. Cam and Alan arrange to meet up outside hospital. Jack and his soldiers arrive at the site to secure the oil drums. Teddy is trying to help Abigail, a pre-teen girl who has wandered onto the site, when there is an explosion, injuring her and Private Attwater. Teddy freezes and Iain, who has arrived with the HEMS team has to take charge. Stevie has been given oxycodone instead of the opioid-free pain killer she requested but takes some anyway. She is confused when Abigail comes in and unknowingly gives her a morphine overdose. Matty corrects it and Dylan assumes it was his mistake. Matty tries to ask Stevie out but she insists their arrangement is just sex. Flynn finds old bruises on Attwater and tries to quiz Private Rory Dickson about them. Jan stands Teddy down as head paramedic. Guest starring Adam Loxley, Calin Bleau and Desi Ivanova
1393	24	"Episode 4"	George Siougas	Erin Kubicki	23 May 2026	2.29
Dylan tells Stevie that Matty made a mistake. Stevie encourages him to report it but Matty tells her it was her mistake and people will find out about them if it comes out. Dylan decides to stay quiet. Matty treats a girl with an infected piercing. Stevie has to perform temporary pacing on an evangelical Christian and former drug addict who has a bad heart. Nicole looks after a teenage boy, Cory, whose mother Rachel says her husband will be angry if he finds they're not at home. Nicole realises Cory's injury is a defensive wound and admits him for observation, giving Rachel the number of a refuge. Faith befriends Mia, another mother of a premature baby, but goes into shock when Pearl starts choking and has to be resuscitated. Iain has his phone stolen and chases the thief onto the Wyvern Hill estate where the thief falls and is impaled. Iain and Teddy carry him to safety and Dylan realises they are all showing signs of chemical exposure, meaning the soil is contaminated. Jodie calls Emilia to warn her but Emilia announces the estate is safe to return to. Guest starring Macadie Amoroso, Joe Dawson and Ellen O'Grady
1394	25	"Episode 5"	Paul Riordan	Toby Walton	30 May 2026	2.34
Flynn and Iain answer a HEMS call to an army training exercise where Rory and another soldier, Kevin, have fallen into a crevice. Rory only has superficial injuries but Kevin has a serious head wound and is left in a coma in intensive care. Both have old injuries. Flynn knows Jack has his men beat new recruits as an initiation and suspects Rory was concussed from a beating. Jack takes Rory away to make a statement clearing the army. Rash is back on the ED and helps out with Cam's corridor patients. An elderly man with incontinent problems learns he may need a catheter and loses his temper with a younger man with a swollen testicle who has been streaming everything. Dylan talks to a therapist about being tempted to drink again. Rachel is brought in after being in a car crash. Jacob mentions she had a bag in the car and her husband Adrian realises she was planning to take Cory and leave him, hitting Rida and dragging Rachel to the floor. Dylan wrestles with him until security arrive, while Rachel is taken to surgery. Cam visits Alan at home; his family have moved away and he is struggling on his own, asking Cam to help him die. Indie later finds he has taken an overdose and sits with him as he dies. Cam finds him dead on his own. Guest starring Lyndsay Fielding, Brayden Emmanuel and Paul Rider The full script for the episode can be read on the BBC Writers website.
1395	26	"Episode 6"	Paul Riordan	Erin Kubicki	6 June 2026	2.41
Flynn learns Rory has been found in an agitated state walking in the middle of the road. He fails to convince a psychiatrist to section him and learns Jack kept him tied up in the barrack for days. Rory disappears and is brought back in after being hit by a car. Flynn saves his life with a tricky procedure. A woman is brought in insisting she has been bit by a super-bug. The staff suspect she is suffering from psychosis but Flynn learns she is right. A man arrives with a heavily bleeding cyst on his leg. It becomes clear he has cancer and the tumour has burst through an artery. His wife overhears Matty saying he won't make Christmas and tells Jodie he worked on the first Wyvern Hill development. Jodie and Rash fail to convince Laura it was the chemicals, not her drinking, that caused Zak's death. Jessica brings in Arthur with bronchiolitis. She worked in the selling department of the development and tells Nicole she has little chance of getting her deposit back and should try to sell the property on. Flynn and Stevie go for a drink, where Stevie breaks up with Matty by text and Flynn reveals a fellow recruit committed suicide because of Jack's bullying. He has second thoughts about parting company with her but finds she has already taken a taxi. Guest starring Moe Idris, Richard Prayl and Laura Rollins The full script for the episode can be read on the BBC Writers website.
1396	27	"Episode 7"	Rhys Carter	Patrick Homes	13 June 2026	2.33
Iain and Jodie chair a meeting for those affected by the Wyvern contamination. Faith abruptly leaves. The staff deal with casualties from a boat that capsized during a stag party. Groom Craig has had to be resuscitated after nearly drowning and best man Aaron has badly injured his arm on a propeller helping him. Bride Brit arrives but Craig declares his love to Aaron rather than her on waking up, although he later seems to regret it. Faith helps Brit through a panic attack as she admits knowing Craig was sleeping with them both but thinking Aaron was just casual. Faith tells Iain she's going to return to work. Jacob and Teddy are called out by six-year-old Ivy, who has been acting as a carer for her mother Kirsty, who has sickle cell. It transpires Ivy gave her extra painkillers after she injured herself in a fall, overdosing her. Nicole agrees to let Ivy stay with Kirsty overnight rather than calling social services. Teddy admits he never met his father. Rida learns her hair loss is down to alopecia, not stress. Jessica brings Arthur in for a check and arranges a coffee with Rash. Indie brings in a make-up artist injured in an eScooter accident. Cam feels guilty that Alan has left him his watch and Indie admits she was with Alan when he died. Matty tells Dylan about his fling with Stevie and her mistake with Abigail. Although Stevie and Matty clear the air, Dylan reports her to Flynn. Guest starring Colin Ryan, Calvin Dean and Lowri Palfrey
1397	28	"Episode 8"	Gareth Edward Evans	Michelle Lipton	20 June 2026	2.48
Dylan tells HR that Stevie should be dismissed. The hospital is swamped with patients worried about contaminated water. It turns out the hospital's water supply is contaminated. Flynn and Iain see Rex, a member of the action group, fall from the roof and have to treat him with no theatre or proper equipment. Although he claimed his wife died of cancer, it turns out she is still alive and Rex is a foreman with Goldclave, who was on the roof infecting the water with charcoal. Ivy comes in badly burned, having had an accident while Kirsty was asleep. Nicole discovers Kirsty wanted help from social services and apologises for not alerting them earlier. Indie helps Cam in the corridor, meeting a patient with a broken leg and his boyfriend. The patient suffers a stroke and it is realised a smaller one caused his fall. He and his boyfriend were both planning to propose. Rida convinces Rash to cancel his coffee with Jessica. Jodie discovers a nurse catalogued cases of cancer linked to Wyvern Hill and told Goldclave but was ignored. She convinces Laura the area is unsafe. Stevie hands a woman complaining about her water making her ill to Matty, who discovers she has been putting sterilising tablets in her drinking water and basically drinking bleach, causing internal bleeding. He blames Stevie for not checking her history but Stevie saves the woman's life before defending herself to HR. Guest starring Jennifer Brooke, Pearse Egan and Tom Kelsey
1398	29	"Episode 9"	Jenny Thompson	Alex Mathias	27 June 2026	2.20
Flynn announces that both Stevie and Matty are to be placed under supervision and Stevie is banned from Resus. Teddy and Jacob are called out to a pub where a young woman has been glassed in front of her grandfather. Teddy and Matty argue about Teddy not doing all the recommended tests. It turns out the attack was revenge for the grandfather borrowing money from loan sharks and gambling it away. Teddy and Jacob's next call is to a woman who has died with Teddy having to comfort her young son. They are then sent to a man with learning difficulties who is living alone for the first time and injured himself putting up a shelf. His best friend arrives for a party as they are leaving. They are later called back: The party has got out of control and the friend was badly beaten trying to shut it down. Teddy again clashes with Rash over the treatment but an encounter with a grateful Ivy convinces him to arrange a meeting with his father. Flynn treats a patient with an axe in his ankle. Rory wants to be discharged from the army on medical grounds and agrees to report Jack if Kevin agrees. When Kevin dies, Flynn signs the discharge papers and reports Jack himself. Siobhan encourages Jodie to speak at a council meeting about the Wyvern Hill development. Cam tells Siobhan Banfield is being released and Jan invites her to stay with her. Dylan is giving a keynote speech and Stevie encourages Matty to attend. He watches from the back as Dylan gives a speech about teamwork but leaves when he sees Dylan start drinking. Guest starring Tommy Rhys-Powell, Iain McKee and Glen Davies
1399	30	"Episode 10"	Jenny Thompson	Poz Watson	11 July 2026	2.14
Dylan wakes up hungover in a hotel toilet but makes it into work. Faith is also starting back. A young girl is brought in from a fire at her home after being rescued by her father. When her mother and younger brother are brought in, it is revealed the father has a restraining order out against him. It transpires an immigrant family who shared the flat with them have also been injured and a man arrested for the arson, done for anti-immigrant reasons. The father admits he inadvertently provoked it by complaining about the situation. Faith treats an elderly couple celebrating their 40th wedding anniversary in a hot air balloon which crashed. The wife has terminal cancer and tells her husband she would rather spend her remaining time quietly with him. Faith admits to Iain she's been avoiding Pearl because she's scared of losing her. A teenage boy is brought in from a well-off home. Dylan and Jodie learn he has been self-harming but his mother wants to send him to a private hospital for anti-depressants rather than let him defer college. Iain tells Jodie the group want someone else to speak at the meeting and she learns about Rida's alopecia. Jessica brings Arthur in after he has a fit caused by a fever and is reluctant to let Rash see him, but after Rida reminds her doctors can't date patients, they clear the air. Jan admits to Jacob that she is avoiding home because of her attraction to Siobhan. Matty tells Stevie about Dylan drinking. She goes to his house boat but finds he has already left. Guest starring Henry Avedian, Amelie Whiteley and Paul Antony-Barber
1400	31	"Episode 11"	Karl Neilson	Erin Kubicki	18 July 2026	2.50
Dylan goes to the care home where his father Brian is staying. Brian has brain damage from alcohol abuse but makes disparaging remarks about Dylan. Dylan learns he is next of kin since Brian is divorced again and gives permission for a DNR. Iain asks Jodie to get the evidence ready for the council meeting but Nicole intercepts and bins it. She later regrets it on meeting a deaf patient with an ectopic pregnancy who lives at Wyvern Hill; Rash tried to write down what was wrong with her but failed to properly explain so Nicole has to. Jodie arrives late for the meeting but tells the council head the details and later hears Goldwater have been denied permission for further development. Stevie and Matty find Dylan has left a rambling phone message that ends in a crash and tell Flynn about his drinking. Dylan arrives with only a minor head injury and passes a breathalyser test. Another patient, Seb, has extensive injuries. Matty continues with a resuscitation and gets his heart going but signs are he is brain dead. Stevie realises the other driver, Ella, caused the crash after taking nitrous oxide at the wheel. Siobhan treats a man who claims to have been bitten by a dog but finds a child's tooth. She learns he is wanted for trying to abduct a child and Flynn apprehends him after Cam finds him hiding. Jan admits her feelings to Siobhan. Flynn learns the case against Jack has been dropped. He goes to an army pub to try and convince people to give evidence against Jack but Jack throws him out. Guest starring David Beames, Romayne Andrews and Katie Erich
1401	32	"Episode 12"	Karl Neilson	Claire Miller	25 July 2026	2.42
Flynn, Teddy and Jacob are called out when Jack apparently accidentally shoots himself during a training exercise. When they are sniped at, it becomes obvious he was shot deliberately. Penny gets past the police guard at the hospital and aims a gun at Jack, revealing he broke her hand and left her tied up for three days. Flynn and an apparently contrite Jack talk her down but Jack later makes it clear he only said it as a tactic and believes he is right. Flynn refuses to help Stevie resuscitate Jack and he later dies in theatre. Jodie learns Goldwater have offered the residents compensation but they are holding out for more. Rash and Rida treat a man with appendicitis who keeps seeking advice from his girlfriend via phone: It turns out his "girlfriend" is an AI app. Cam isolates a woman with cancer and low immunity in a cupboard. Dylan and Matty look after a 13-year-old boy who nearly drowned trying to save the family dog and his older sister who rescued him; the siblings reconcile during the chaos and learn the dog is fine. Matty accompanies Dylan to an AA meeting. Jan and Siobhan clear the air and Siobhan decides to move back home. Rash learns he has passed his CESR exam. Guest starring Alexander Perkins, Danny Rahim and Daisy Mayer The full script for the episode can be read on the BBC Writers website.
40th Anniversary Special
1402	33	"40th Anniversary Part 1"	Steve Hughes	Toby Walton	5 September 2026	2.54
An explosion takes place at St James' and Flynn, whose 40th birthday it is, rushes to the scene to help out, leaving Dylan in charge of Holby. Stevie joins him as a HEMS doctor. Several casualties are driven to the hospital by concerned passers-by, including Cheryl, who is worried about her son. Siobhan finds his phone on a dead patient. Sophia is brought in badly burned and Dylan makes a futile attempt to save her. Cam looks after a number of walking wounded and a skater who collapses having a fit turns out to be diabetic. Armed police come to the hospital investigating worries of a concerted bomb attack. Teddy and Jacob are assigned to transport Doug, who had his leg amputated at the scene, while Flynn, Stevie and Indie transport Ahmed, a cleaner with blast damage to his lungs. The police want to close down the department when a bag is found but Dylan carries it outside and reveals the harmless contents. The disaster is revealed to be a harmless gas explosion. An injured driver, Leo, causes Indie to swerve the ambulance and end up suspended over a cliff edge. Guest starring Grant Burgin, Waleed Elgadi and Pippa Haywood
1403	34	"40th Anniversary Part 2"	Steve Hughes	Michelle Lipton	5 September 2026	2.48
Doug makes it to the hospital where Dylan amputates his other leg to save his life. Leo helps Indie get Ahmed to safety but the ambulance falls into a lake with Flynn and Stevie inside. The news causes Dylan to shut himself away, leaving Rash, on his first shift as consultant, in charge. Charlie and Ethan, who were at St James', arrive to help out even though Ethan has hand tremors. Jodie takes Cheryl to see her son's body but it turns out to be a friend and her son is found alive. Thieves steal some of the hospital's drugs although Rida recovers some of them. Ahmed, a surgeon in his own country, helps Indie save Leo's brother Elliot until Iain, Jacob and Teddy arrive to transport them. Flynn manages to drag Stevie out of the lake before collapsing from a leg injury and Indie finds and treats them until help arrives. Charlie convinces Dylan to help save them both. Flynn leaves with his family and Stevie and other casualties begin to recover. Guest starring Kent Riley, Tommy Oldroyd and Waleed Elgadi
