= Headbutt =

Attack using the head

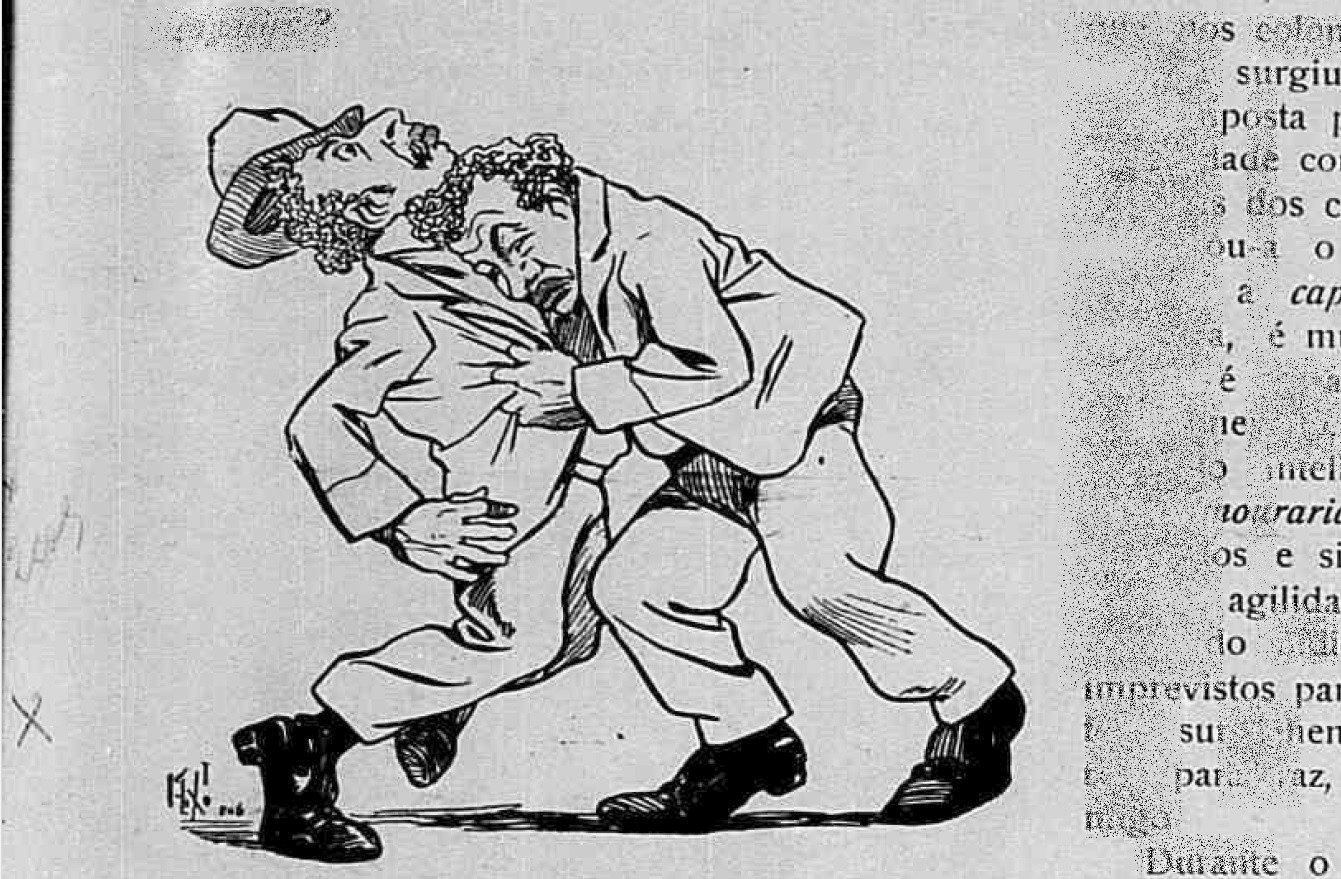
Caricature of capoeira carioca from Rio, using cocada headbutt in a 1906 caricature by Brazilian artist Calixto Cordeiro

A headbutt or butt is a targeted strike with the head, typically involving the use of robust parts of the headbutter's cranium as the area of impact. The most effective headbutts strike the most sensitive areas of an opponent, such as the nose, using the stronger bones in the forehead (frontal bone) or the back of the skull (occipital or parietal bone). The word is both a noun and a verb.

Headbutts are generally discouraged except as a last resort in combat instruction, and can cause severe injury to the person delivering the headbutt as well as the target.

== Mechanics ==
Headbutts can be used from close range such as from the clinch, or on the ground. They are typically applied to the head of the opponent, since the head is often a readily available target and has several sensitive areas, but can be delivered to any part of the body. It is considered a quick, very effective but risky maneuver, as a misplaced strike can also cause injury to the person delivering the headbutt.

An effective headbutt can be performed with a forward, rising, sideways or backwards motion; each being effective from different positions. Parts of the cranium with thick bone and high local curvature make for good weapon areas, and these include the forehead near the hairline, the outboard curved part of the parietal bone, and the occiput. Ideal targets are usually the fragile areas of the head, including the bridge of the nose, the cheekbones, the hinge area of the jaw, the temple, and the top edge of the eye socket.

Hitting the opponent's teeth or mouth is likely to cause mutual damage. The chin of the enemy is also a generally bad position to headbutt unless striking from below up into the bottom of the chin, similar to an uppercut.

== Animals ==
Headbutting between males of the green humphead parrotfish

Muskox engaging in headbutting

Rams, male sheep, and bucks, male goats, are both well-known for headbutting as a form of fighting behaviour. While this can be done by any ruminant for self-defense, it is most commonly observed between males seeking dominance in a flock or herd. A superior male can demonstrate their strength to potential mates and deter other males from breeding by deterring them in a headbutting contest. It is the horns on their head that collide when doing this, explaining why the rams do not suffer catastrophic injury, but this still incurs extreme compression pressure on their neck during a collision. A study of skeletons of wild Soay sheep found damage to the centrum of at least one cervical vertebrae in over half of rams (but none in ewes), the result of fighting and butting during their lives. From this behavior the terms battering ram and hydraulic ram are derived.

Headbutting goat bucks have been suggested as a good model to use for studying chronic traumatic encephalopathy (CTE), a trauma associated with repeated head hits seen in human boxers, American football players, soccer players who repeatedly practice headers, and so on.

Cats engage in a gentle behavior that resembles headbutting, where they "bunt" a person or another animal with their forehead scent glands to mark their territory with pheromones.

Some prehistoric animals are also thought to have engaged in headbutting, such as pachycephalosaurian dinosaurs, as well as tapinocephalid therapsids.

== Sports ==
=== Combat sports ===
Headbutts are generally forbidden in most combat sports and, if performed, result in penalties and even disqualifications. However, it is a strike allowed in Lethwei (which is the only professional sport allowing the strike), capoeira, muay boran, combat sambo, some full-contact karate rulesets/variants - namely Kūdō - and in the self-defence art of krav maga. In traditional boxing, official game style regulations are used if the headbutt is accidental. If a match does not reach halfway, it is no contest. If it reaches past the official match point, then scores will be calculated.

It is also the primary focus of the Eritrean martial art Testa. Headbutts were a commonly used technique in vale tudo and mixed martial arts before the introduction of the unified rules of MMA. Similarly, although the art itself forbids any kind of strikes, some masters of judo taught the use of headbutts under the name of atama ate waza, as demonstrated by Kyuzo Mifune and Mikinosuke Kawaishi.

=== Association football ===
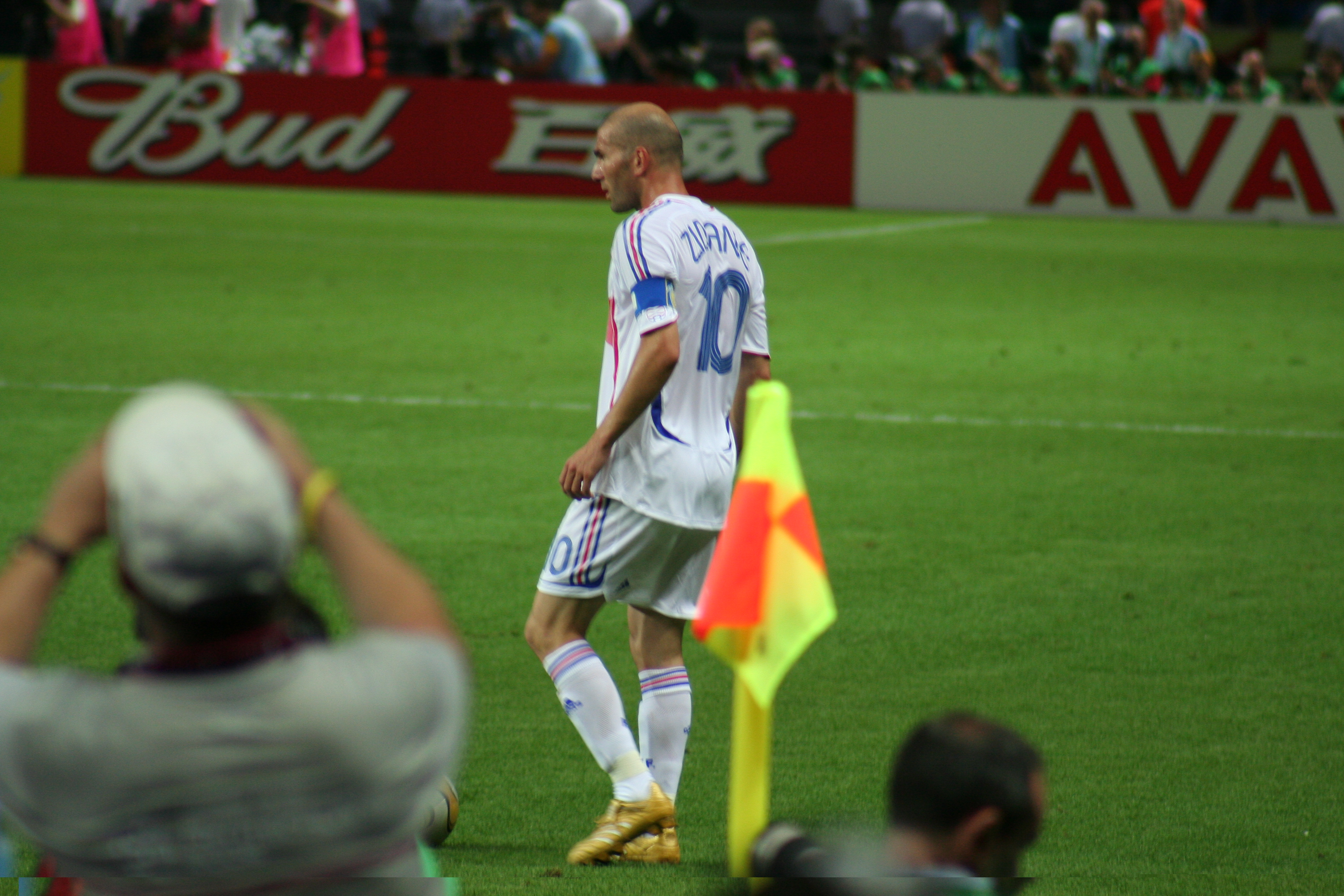
Zinedine Zidane converted a controversial penalty and was sent off for a headbutt in the 2006 FIFA World Cup Final

Intentional headbutting is irregular in association football and even attempting one will warrant dismissal by a red card. Famously, during the 2006 FIFA World Cup Final between Italy and France, French team captain Zinedine Zidane headbutted Italian player Marco Materazzi after an angry exchange. Zidane received a red card, and Italy won the match on penalties. It was his last professional game, and ended his career on a "discordant" note. This moment was later immortalized by a sculpture titled "Headbutt" by French artist Adel Abdessemed.

In February 2011, Gennaro Gattuso was suspended for four matches after confronting and headbutting Tottenham Hotspur assistant coach Joe Jordan at the conclusion of a UEFA Champions League match.

In 2016, Roy O'Donovan was handed an eight match ban, one of the longest bans in A-League Men history, after he headbutted Phoenix defender Manny Muscat.

In August 2022, Liverpool player Darwin Núñez received a red card for headbutting Crystal Palace player Joachim Andersen after several rough tackles between each other during the match.

=== Ice hockey ===
Headbutting is not allowed in ice hockey. In the National Hockey League even an unsuccessful attempt at headbutting warrants a double minor. An actual headbutt is a major penalty and a game misconduct, and a match penalty is mandatory if the referee rules that there was reckless endangerment.

=== Handball ===
On March 3, 2014, Milena Knežević headbutted Anita Görbicz during the last seconds of the game between ŽRK Budućnost and Győri ETO KC in the EHF Women's Champions League group stage. Knežević was banned for the next two matches.

=== Wrestling ===
On April 9, 2017, Japanese wrestler Katsuyori Shibata headbutted Kazuchika Okada during their match at Sakura Genesis 2017. The headbutt was so hard that it caused Shibata to start bleeding from the forehead. After the match, Shibata collapsed backstage, from where he was taken to the hospital and diagnosed with a subdural hematoma.

Scottish wrestler Drew McIntyre uses a headbutt as part of his moveset that is called the Glasgow Kiss.

== Fiction and culture ==
The character Yosser Hughes in Boys from the Blackstuff was noted for headbutting people and inanimate objects. In one scene, his young daughter headbutts a social worker.

In 2009's Paul Blart: Mall Cop, Paul Blart headbutts a criminal breaking into his mall after store hours. He succeeds, knocking them out and pushing them into the ball pit below, but he injures himself just as badly as his opponent, grimacing in pain and stating, "Ugh... Nobody wins with a headbutt."

In Demon Slayer: Kimetsu no Yaiba, the main character Tanjiro Kamado is noted to have a hard head, and occasionally uses headbutts in his fights.
