= Kim Chang =

Fictional character from Casualty

- Casualty character
- First appearance: Episode 1378; 10 January 2026
- Last appearance: Episode 1389; 18 April 2026
- Portrayed by: Jasmine Bayes

In-universe information
- Occupation: Resident doctor
- Family: Wei Chang (father)

Kim Chang is a fictional character from the BBC medical drama Casualty, portrayed by Jasmine Bayes. She first appears in the ninth episode of the fortieth series, first broadcast on 10 January 2026. Kim is introduced as one of two resident doctors, brought in alongside long-term friend Matty Linlaker (Aron Julius). She is a newly-qualified resident who is new to working in an emergency department and comes from a long lineage of doctors, therefore feeling as though she has a lot to prove. She is a perfectionist who does not believe in her own skills, but is studious, kind and enjoys making people feel good. Kim is shown to be a lover of the colour pink, often shown sporting a pink stethoscope and using a fluffy pink pen.

Kim begins to idolise her mentor, Stevie Nash (Elinor Lawless), believing she is an amazing doctor and wanting to be like her. However, Stevie believes in a tough love training approach and is consistently tough and overbearing with Kim. Over time, Kim is shown to be hiding a secret and is obsessed with an application on her phone. It is eventually shown to be a calorie tracking app since she has an eating disorder, atypical anorexia nervosa. Kim becomes obsessed with vomiting her food up, over-exercising and losing weight, eventually getting hold of unregulated weight loss syringes. The weight loss and syringes cause her to dramatically lose competency at work and make numerous mistakes, including being responsible for the permanent paralysis of a patient. She eventually quits and dies from her eating disorder due to multi-organ failure.

The character of Kim was created specifically to show the effects that eating disorders and weight loss syringes can have on people. Bayes found it tough to play out the story arc. However, she appreciated the decision to have her character suffer from atypical anorexia nervosa as opposed to typical anorexia nervosa, since it showed that anybody could suffer from an eating disorder, particularly in a busy work environment such as an emergency department. Her portrayal of the character was praised by critics and viewers, with Kim billed as a "fan-favourite" despite her short tenure in the series.

== Casting and characterisation ==
Since 2023, Casualty has aired in "discrete mini-series" that each consist of 12 episodes, often referred to as a boxset. For the first boxset of 2026, titled Learning Curve, two new resident doctors were introduced to the programme: Kim Chang and Matty Linlaker (Aron Julius). It was confirmed that the boxset would revolve around the new residents battling their personal and professional problems.

Actress Jasmine Bayes was cast as Jasmine. She is introduced as a newly-qualified resident doctor who is new to working in an emergency department (ED). Speaking on the character, Bayes said that Kim descends from a long lineage of doctors and therefore feels as though she has a lot to prove. She added that the pressure had made Kim become "quite the perfectionist". Speaking about Kim in a video for Casualty's social media, Bayes said that she is a kind, caring and studious character who likes to make people feel good. Despite her personality, Kim does not believe in her professional skillset. She is shown to be a character that loves pink, often shown sporting a pink stethoscope and using a fluffy pink pen.

== Development ==
=== Introduction ===
On Kim's first shift in the ED, she learns that she has been allocated a mentor, Stevie Nash (Elinor Lawless). She initially assumes Stevie is a man and accidentally casts aspersions about her to Stevie herself. Kim is "horrified" when Stevie introduces herself, but an embarrassed Kim immediately impresses Stevie by correctly explaining a treatment for a patient. However, Kim soon irritates Stevie when she alarms the emergency alarm for what transpires to be a false alarm and it was hinted that Kim would have trouble impressing Stevie again. Stevie questions Kim on if she is cut out for working in the ED, to which Kim declares that she is meant to be there. Kim once again annoys Stevie when she is wrapped up with an app on her phone instead of work, which Stevie scolds Kim for. After making more mistakes including being unable to fix a dislocated shoulder, Kim remains "eager" to impress and please Stevie in the wake of irritating her. Speaking on Kim's relationship with Stevie, Bayes said that it is an "interesting" one. She felt Stevie is very tough on Kim, but ultimately does believe in her skillset, despite Kim not believing in herself. Kim idolises Stevie and sees her as an amazing doctor, wanting to both impress her and be like her.

Introduced alongside Matty, an established friendship for the pair transpired to viewers. It was explained that Kim had studied medicine alongside Matty. Despite being very good friends, they are very different; Bayes referred to them as "very much chalk and cheese". However, she felt that the pair complimented each other well and bring out the best in one another. When they start at the ED together, Kim draws up a checklist of surgeries and procedures that they can tick off when they perform them for the first time. He entrusts Kim with a secret when she learns that he has called the Care Quality Commission (CQC) on the department, believing there is malpractice. It results in the ED facing intense scrutiny.

Kim and Matty are placed in a training simulation with Grace Clements (Poppy Roe), an expert in dangerous pathogens playing the role of a patient for them. Matty argues that the personal protective equipment (PPE) they have been provided is out of date and refuses to wear it properly, despite Kim wearing hers. Unbeknownst to them, Grace is actually ill as she has come into contact with a pathogen that she cannot disclose due to her work with the ministry of defence. An "anxious" Kim notices that Grace is tachycardic with a high temperature. Grace begins coughing blood, which splatters on Matty's unprotected face and Kim steps up to diagnose Grace and help Matty.

=== Secret eating disorder ===
Kim struggles with cannulation and later raises Stevie's suspicions when she begins to notice that Kim is hiding something, despite beginning to make less mistakes at work. Stevie is scolded for the way she talks to Kim, with Flynn Byron (Olly Rix) believing that she is crossing a line. Matty later notices Kim's continued obsession with going on her phone during shifts. On a shift, she helps a victim of domestic abuse to escape from his husband despite Stevie's initial doubts. Stevie is proud of Kim and takes her out for a meal, where Kim's phone constantly sounds with notifications. Stevie asks if she has her own controlling partner, but Kim stresses that it is a group chat with fellow resident doctors. She excuses herself to reply to them, but instead makes herself vomit up the meal she has eaten in the toilets. It then transpires that Kim has been obsessed with a calorie tracking app and has an eating disorder.

Kim is shaky when treating a patient, which frustrates Stevie, who snaps at her. She later performs a chest drain, which stresses Kim out. After an emotionally testing shift, Matty offers Kim food, which she eagerly accepts, before her eating disorder takes hold of her and she "panics about the consequences". It leads to her over-exercising and Stevie "remains in the dark", continuing her training approach of tough love. Kim "continues to push herself to her limit" by jogging to work, overjoyed when she sees she has hit 500% of her daily movement goal on her phone. On a shift that the CQC are observing, Kim suffers from symptoms of her eating disorder and suggests to Matty that they team up. Matty realises he must perform a lumbar puncture, a "risky procedure", on a patient and is reluctant to ask Flynn or Dylan Keogh (William Beck) for help, so asks Kim to walk him through it. Low on energy due to her eating disorder, her vision blurs and she misreads the instructions. She assures Matty he can insert a needle higher in the patient's back, despite the instructions reading that it is forbidden. The patient becomes paralysed, which results in the CQC withdrawing the ED's ability to take on major traumas overnight, leading to the staff thinking there will be job losses.

=== Isolation and confiding in Matty ===
Since the ED's stripping of major traumas at night, the hospital's funding and reputation is damaged and Kim and Matty are "shunned" when their colleagues are distant with them. Matty also judges Kim, wondering how she could have misread such vital information, to which Kim claims anyone could make an error under pressure, trying to hide her eating disorder. Stevie, however, has faith in Kim and even believes that she is lying on behalf of Matty due to their friendship. She believes that Kim had no involvement in the patient's paralysis, especially when Kim persuades Stevie to let her perform a facial laceration, a complex procedure, which she performs perfectly. Stevie opens up about her previous ovarian cancer diagnosis and encourages Kim to be honest too, but she refuses to open up, leading Stevie to supervise Kim more closely. A panicked Kim then approaches Flynn and asks for a new mentor to replace Stevie, afraid she will learn of her eating disorder.

Kim is shocked when she has to treat her former therapist, who treated Kim for her eating disorder. The therapist urges her to be honest about her situation. The same day, Matty becomes concerned about Kim's eating habits and suspects she is "suffering in silence". Matty then notices that Kim's vision is once again blurred and that she is dizzy while treating a patient and questions her. He later collars Kim and gently states his belief that she has an eating disorder, referencing her dizziness, fatigue, sickness and blurred vision. She is set to open up to him until they are interrupted by Stevie. Kim is later honest with Matty and it transpires that Kim's backstory involves having spent time in a mental health unit to treat her eating disorder, often being rushed to the ED for treatment, which is where she learned she wanted to work there. Worried for Kim's health, Matty tells her to confide in Stevie. A panicked Kim then blackmails Matty, urging him to keep her secret or she will tell everyone that it was him who made the call to the CQC.

=== Quitting and death ===
The ED treat a bus driver who crashed his bus due to the effects of weight loss syringes he had bought online with no medical advice. Kim speaks to him and he speaks about feeling awful for causing a crash. Wanting to change his ways, he gives his weight loss syringes to Kim, asking her to destroy them. However, she takes them home and starts injecting herself. Digital Spy's Erin Zammitt wrote that Kim's eating disorder would then "spiral out of control" in scenes set to follow.

Ahead of scenes involving a final CQC inspection, a Casualty producer stated that it was "the last chance saloon for our beloved hospital" and hinted that it would be a "very chaotic shift". Kim's condition deteriorates and she is worried when the "spotlight is on her" as a CQC inspector shadows her treatment of a patient. "Haunted" by intrusive thoughts about food, she becomes distracted when taking a patient's bloods snaps back into focus when she has to rush them into resus. Matty takes over the treatment and notices that Kim's handwriting is illegible on the blood forms. He edits the forms, correcting her mistakes. A Casualty producer explained: "He knows about his friend's eating disorder and doesn't want her to get into trouble, so he discretely rewrites the information. But it's forbidden to make edits to these forms, so the bloods have to be repeated because of Matty's intervention". The mistake is quickly picked up and Kim is once again scolded by Stevie, who tells her she cannot make another mistake. She locks herself in a toilet cubicle, where Matty insists that she gets help for her eating disorder. To appease him, she agrees, but secretly injects herself with more of the weight loss syringe.

Following her latest mistake at work, Kim decides a medical career is not for her and resigns from her rotation at Holby ED, much to Matty's upset. In the wake of her exit from the hospital, Matty is offered a clinical fellowship but is sceptical about taking it. Kim's father, Wei Chang (Dave Wong), arrives at the hospital and informs Stevie that Kim has atypical anorexia nervosa, to her shock. Matty overhears and decides to visit Kim at her house, where he finds a "horrific scene" when she is unconscious on the floor, covered in blood. The same episode began with a flashforward to the funeral of one of the hospital team, with the dead character remaining a mystery until the conclusion of the episode. HEMS is called out to her and Matty "finally learns the devastating extent of his mate’s eating disorder". Stevie is similarly "blindsided" by the news of Kim's condition, particularly when Matty angrily reads out parts of Kim's journal, which detail Stevie's harsh mentorship of her.

Whilst trying to save Kim, they discover that she is suffering from multi-organ failure and that the weight loss drugs have taken a toll on her body. Blood begins to pour out of her mouth and CPR has no effect on her. Matty desperately tries to revive Kim, but it does not work and she dies, with Matty dragged away by Dylan. At the conclusion of the episode, Stevie is asked to deliver the eulogy at Kim's funeral, and blaming herself for what happened, she struggles to read the words in front of her. Matty then checks off the last procedure on their shared checklist.

Speaking about her storyline and exit, Bayes said that filming it was tough since she was aware of the importance and sensitivity of it but acknowledged that it was a "story that had to be shared". Bayes appreciated that Casualty chose to represent someone with atypical anorexia nervosa, since it showed "how someone can be really struggling internally and invisibly, and you just wouldn't know about it", particularly in a busy workplace such as the ED. She also gave a nod to the research team who work on Casualty, as well as the writers and medical advisors, who ensured that the story arc was representing real people with eating disorders well.

== Reception ==
Erin Zammitt, writing for Digital Spy, commended Kim's skills as a doctor, writing that she is "clearly a talented doctor" despite her eating disorder. Zammitt's colleague, Harriet Mitchell, complimented Kim's friendship with Matty. She found the scenes of Kim opening up to him about her eating disorder "emotional". Zammitt called Kim's death "tragic". She also praised Bayes for her portrayal of a character with an eating disorder. She wrote: "Rising star Jasmine Bayes delivered a brilliant, layered performance as Kim over just a few short months, while her character's story showed how destructive eating disorders can be, especially when they are kept hidden." She felt that Kim's death was tragic "in its own right", but also felt that her death had made way for numerous dramatic storylines. Wales Online commented on the upset that viewers experienced at Kim's death, billing her a "fan-favourite". Many viewers felt that although the story had been portrayed well, Kim deserved more time to be developed.
