= Barry Sloane =

English actor

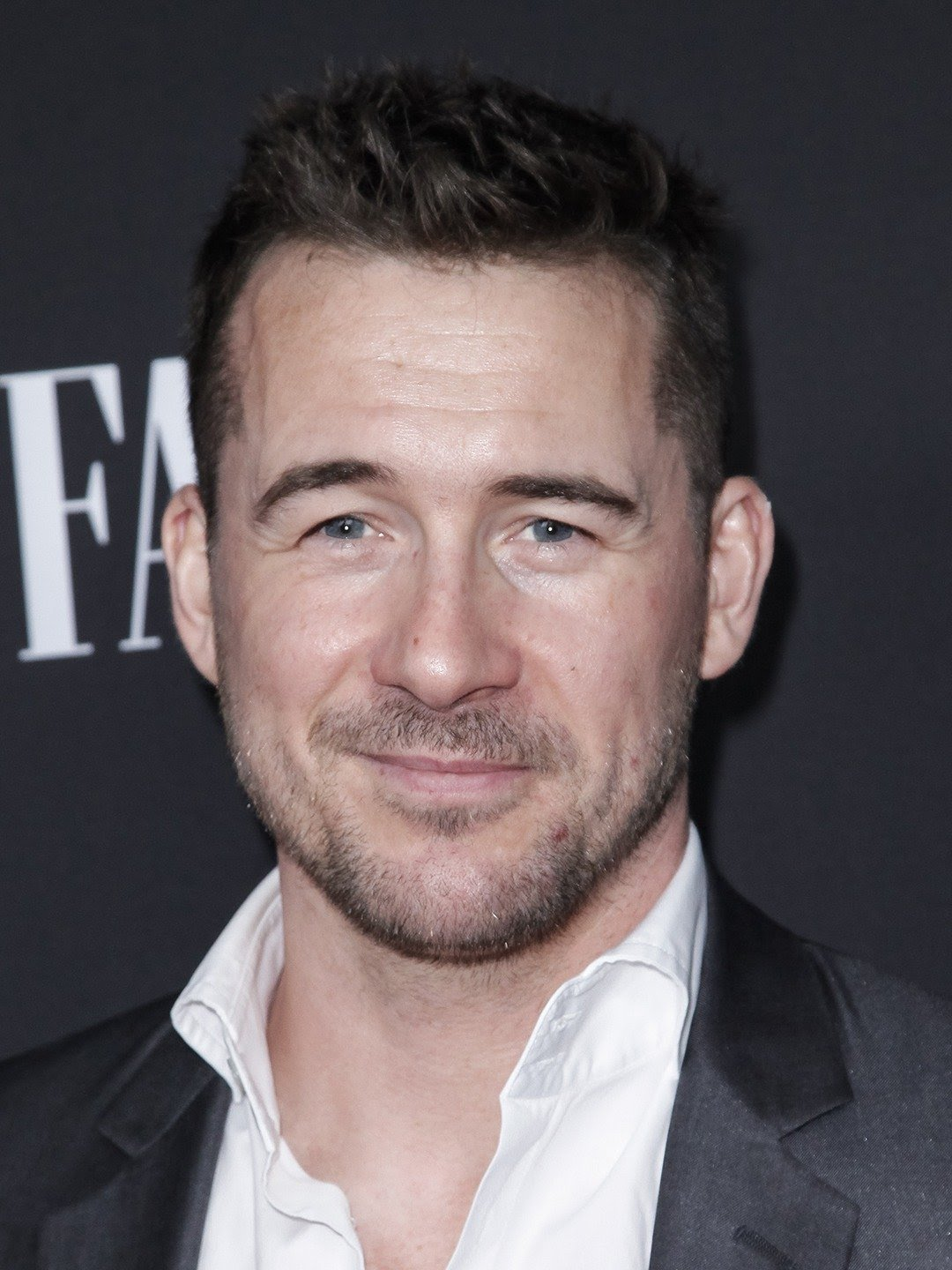
- Sloane in 2019
- Born: February 10, 1981 (aged 45); Liverpool, England
- Occupation: Actor
- Years active: 2000–present
- Spouse: Katy O'Grady (m. 2013)
- Children: 2

Barry Sloane (born February 10, 1981) is an English actor. He has appeared in numerous television shows, and in the RTS Royal Television Society Programme Awards and BAFTA Award–winning television films Pleasureland and The Mark of Cain. In 2010, Sloane made his West End debut in Jez Butterworth's Jerusalem.

Sloane began his acting career in British television, appearing in series such as DCI Banks, Pleasureland, and The Mark of Cain. In July 2012, he was cast as Aiden Mathis in the hit ABC drama series Revenge. In February 2014, he joined the cast of the Steven Spielberg-produced science fiction drama series The Whispers. In 2025, Sloane was cast as Destruction, also known as The Prodigal, in the second season of Netflix's The Sandman. In 2026, he joined the cast of HBO's House of the Dragon for its third season, portraying Ser Adrian Redfort. He also stars in the 2026 BBC crime thriller series The Cage.

Sloane voiced and provided motion capture for Captain Price in the 2019 video game Call of Duty: Modern Warfare, and reprised the role in subsequent Call of Duty games.

== Early life and education ==
Barry Sloane was born in Liverpool, England. From a young age, he was immersed in both music and performance. He played football from the age of seven, played in a band for over 10 years from the age of 13, and did drama through his school years.

In his late teens, he became the lead singer and bass guitarist for the band The Smiling Jackals, which toured extensively across the UK. After his agent booked him a regular role on a TV show, he left the band. In 2023, Sloane announced the band's reunion after 23 years, sharing updates on social media.

== Career ==
In mid-2009 Sloane appeared as Troy Whitworth in Jez Butterworth's critically acclaimed play Jerusalem at London's Royal Court Theatre. It was described as "the greatest British play of the [21st] century" The play was given a West End transfer in January 2010. After a record-breaking sellout run, it was announced that the play would transfer, this time to Broadway. He made his Broadway debut in Jerusalem at the Music Box Theatre in New York City on 4 February 2011.

Sloane starred in Joseph Ruben's 2013 thriller film Penthouse North alongside Michael Keaton and Michelle Monaghan.

On 10 July 2012, Sloane joined the cast of the ABC drama series Revenge as Aiden Mathis, a mysterious man with ties to Emily Thorne's past. It was announced on 23 October 2012 that he had been promoted to series regular. On 20 February 2014, it was reported that Sloane had been cast as Wes Lawrence in the ABC alien drama series The Whispers. Sloane continued his role as Zach on Longmire for the 6th, and last, season in 2017.

Sloane played the role of The Prodigal (also known as Destruction) in the second season of the Netflix series The Sandman in 2025. In 2026, he joined the cast of HBO's House of the Dragon for its third season, portraying Ser Adrian Redfort.

Sloane voiced and provided motion capture for Captain Price in Call of Duty: Modern Warfare (2019), for which he was nominated for British Academy Games Award for Performer in a Leading Role. He reprised the role in Modern Warfare II (2022), Modern Warfare III (2023), and Call of Duty: Modern Warfare 4 (2026).

Sloane stars as Gary in the 2026 BBC crime thriller series The Cage, alongside Sheridan Smith and Michael Socha.

== Personal life ==
Sloane married Katy O'Grady, the fourth-place runner-up of the third series of the Sky One programme Project Catwalk. They have a daughter and a son.

== Filmography ==
=== Film ===
Year	Title	Role	Notes	Ref.
2013	Penthouse North	Chad		
2014	Noah	Poacher Leader	Cameo appearance	
2016	Shooting an Elephant	Eric Blair	Short film; also producer	

=== Television ===
Year	Title	Role	Notes	Ref.
2000	In His Life: The John Lennon Story	Ivan	Television film	
2002–2003	Brookside	Sean Smith	Series regular; 87 episodes	
2003	Pleasureland	Darren	Television film	
2004	I'm a Juvenile Delinquent – Jail Me!	Piers	Television film	
2004	The Courtroom	Barry Potter	Episodes: "Beloved Daughter" & "Reckless"	
2004, 2010–2011	Holby City	Kevin Sharpe	Episode: "A Sense of Guilt"	
2004, 2010–2011	Holby City	Kieran Callaghan	Recurring role; 8 episodes (series 13)	
2007	The Mark of Cain	Private Glynn	Television film	
2007–2008	Hollyoaks	Niall Rafferty	Series regular; 86 episodes	
2008	Hollyoaks Later	Niall Rafferty	Main role; 4 episodes (series 1)	
2010	Casualty	Davey Blake	Episode: "Dark Places"	
2010	The Bill	Josh Hunt	Episode: "Duty Calls"	
2010	Doctors	Brett Sulivan	Episode: "Bleeding"	
2010	DCI Banks	Jackie Wray	Episodes: "Aftermath: Parts 1 & 2"	
2012	Gotham	Boyo	Unaired television pilot	
2012–2014	Revenge	Aiden Mathis	Main role; 43 episodes (seasons 2–3)	
2013	Father Brown	Simeon Barnes	Episode: "The Hammer of God"	
2015	The Whispers	Wes Lawrence	Main role; 13 episodes	
2015, 2017	Longmire	Deputy Zachary Heflin	Recurring role; 10 episodes (seasons 4, 6)	
2015	Saints & Strangers	Edward Winslow	Miniseries; 2 episodes	
2016	Shameless	Ryan	Episodes: "Happily Ever After" & "Requiem for a Slut"	
2017–2018	Six	Joe "Bear" Graves	Main role; 18 episodes	
2019	L.A.'s Finest	Dante Sherman	Recurring role; 7 episodes (season 1)	
2019	Bluff City Law	Jake Reilly	Main role; 10 episodes	
2022	Litvinenko	DS Jim Dawson	Miniseries; 4 episodes	
2022–2025	The Bay	Chris Fischer	Main role; 18 episodes (series 3–5)	
2023	The Company You Keep	Connor Maguire	Recurring role; 5 episodes	
2024	Passenger	Eddie Wells	Main role; 6 episodes	
2025	The Sandman	Destruction / The Prodigal	Recurring role; 4 episodes (season 2)	
2025	The Hack	DS Ezra Slater	Miniseries; 3 episodes	
2026	The Cage	Gary Packer	Miniseries; 5 episodes	
2026	House of the Dragon	Ser Adrian Redfort	Recurring role; 4 episodes (season 3)	

=== Video games ===
Year	Title	Role	Notes	Ref.
2019	Call of Duty: Modern Warfare	Captain John Price	Voice and motion capture	
2020	Call of Duty: Black Ops Cold War	Captain John Price	Downloadable content	
2022	Call of Duty: Modern Warfare II	Captain John Price	Voice and motion capture	
2023	Call of Duty: Modern Warfare III	Captain John Price	Voice and motion capture	
2026	Call of Duty: Modern Warfare 4	Captain John Price	Voice and motion capture	

== Theatre ==
Year	Title	Role	Notes	Ref.
2004–2005	Blood Brothers	Sammy	UK tour with BKL Productions	
2009	Jerusalem	Troy Whitworth	Jerwood Theatre Downstairs; 13 July – 22 August 2009	
2010	Jerusalem	Troy Whitworth	Apollo Theatre; 28 January – 24 April 2010	
2011	Jerusalem	Troy Whitworth	Music Box Theatre; 21 April – 21 August 2011	
2022	Jerusalem	Troy Whitworth	Apollo Theatre revival 16 April – 7 August 2022	
2023	Boys from the Blackstuff	Yosser Hughes	Royal Court Theatre, Liverpool; 15 September – 28 October 2023	
2024	Boys from the Blackstuff	Yosser Hughes	National Theatre, London; 29 May – 8 June 2024	
2024	Boys from the Blackstuff	Yosser Hughes	Garrick Theatre; 13 June – 3 August 2024	
2024	Two of Us	John Lennon	Watford Palace Theatre; 12–21 September 2024; HOME (Manchester) Theatre; 26–28 September 2024	
