= The Black Stuff =

The Black Stuff may refer to

- The Black Stuff, BBC TV play directed by Jim Goddard that launched the Boys from the Blackstuff series
- Guinness, a drink sometimes referred to as "the black stuff"
- The Black Stuff, a natural handmade soap and deodorant company out of Ireland.
