= Puppy Love (TV series) =

- Genre: Comedy
- Written by: Joanna Scanlan; Vicki Pepperdine
- Directed by: Susan Tully
- Starring: Joanna Scanlan; Vicki Pepperdine
- Composer: Nick Foster
- Country of origin: United Kingdom
- Original language: English
- No. of series: 1
- No. of episodes: 6

Production
- Executive producers: Saurabh Kakkar; David Baddiel
- Producer: Jo Willett
- Running time: 30 minutes
- Production company: Woof Productions

Original release
- Network: BBC Four
- Release: 13 November – 18 December 2014

Puppy Love is a British comedy television series broadcast on BBC Four. The first episode was shown on 13 November 2014. It was written by Joanna Scanlan and Vicki Pepperdine, co-creators of Getting On. Puppy Love follows two women at dog training classes on the Wirral.

== Cast ==
- Joanna Scanlan as Nana Vee
- Vicki Pepperdine as Naomi Singh
- Simon Fisher-Becker as Tony Fazackerley
- Selina Borji as Jasmine Singh
- Aron Julius as Eron
- Sunetra Sarker as Lilli Kusiak (2 episodes)

== Production ==
On 9 July 2013 Shane Allen, the controller of BBC comedy commissioning, announced the series along with the second series of Count Arthur Strong. The series was commissioned by Shane Allen and Janice Hadlow. Shane Allen said, "Puppy Love both celebrates and sends up the deeply held relationship between dogs and their owners. This is a real passion piece from Jo and Vicki who have yet again succeeded in creating a wonderful set of characters."

== Episodes ==
Episode One (Thursday 13 November 2014)

Episode Two (Thursday 20 November 2014)

Episode Three (Thursday 27 November 2014)

Episode Four (Thursday 4 December 2014)

Episode Five (Thursday 11 December 2014)

Episode Six (Thursday 18 December 2014)
