= Madagascar Skin =

- Directed by: Chris Newby
- Written by: Chris Newby
- Produced by: Julie Baines
- Starring: Bernard Hill; John Hannah
- Cinematography: Oliver Curtis
- Release date: 1995
- Running time: 91 minutes
- Country: United Kingdom
- Language: English

Madagascar Skin is a 1995 British film starring Bernard Hill and John Hannah.

== Plot summary ==
Hannah plays Harry, a very shy young gay man who has a birthmark in the shape of Madagascar across much of the left-hand side of his face. On fleeing the city and the shallow gay scene, Harry ends up at a rugged stretch of coastline where he meets Flint, played by Bernard Hill. Flint is very heterosexual and the two are wary of each other to begin with. The film focuses on how their relationship is transformed from distrust, through respect, and ultimately to attraction.
