= Bernard Hill =

English actor (1944–2024)

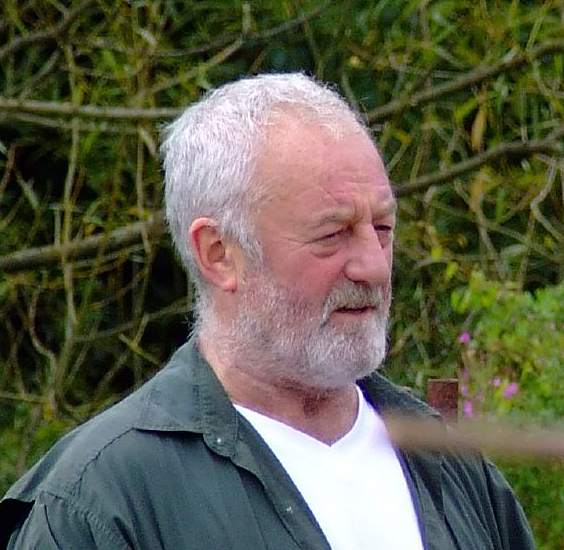
- Hill in 2007
- Born: 17 December 1944; Blackley, Manchester, England
- Died: 5 May 2024 (aged 79); Reydon, Suffolk, England
- Education: Xaverian College; Manchester Polytechnic School of Drama
- Occupation: Actor
- Years active: 1970–2024
- Children: 2

Bernard Hill (17 December 1944 – 5 May 2024) was an English actor. He was known for his versatile roles on stage and screen in a career spanning over fifty years. He earned an Actor Award as well as nominations for two BAFTA TV Awards and an International Emmy Award.

Hill first gained prominence as the troubled hard man Yosser Hughes in Alan Bleasdale's Play for Today drama The Black Stuff (1980) and its sequel serial Boys from the Blackstuff (1982), the latter earning him a nomination for the BAFTA TV Award for Best Actor. He received an additional nomination for his role as David Blunkett in the drama A Very Social Secretary (2005), for which he was also nominated for an International Emmy Award for Best Performance by an Actor. He also appeared on television in I, Claudius (1976), the BBC Television Shakespeare productions of Henry VI, Part 1, 2, and 3, and Richard III (all 1983), Great Expectations (1999), and Wolf Hall (2015).

Hill gained international recognition for his film roles as Captain Edward Smith in Titanic (1997) and Théoden, King of Rohan in the second and third films of The Lord of the Rings film trilogy (2002–2003). His other film credits include Gandhi (1982), The Bounty (1984), Restless Natives (1985), Shirley Valentine (1989), The Ghost and the Darkness (1996), True Crime (1999), Valkyrie (2008), and ParaNorman (2012).

== Early life and education ==
Bernard Hill was born in Blackley, Manchester, on 17 December 1944. He was brought up in a Catholic family of miners.

After attending Xaverian College in Rusholme, Hill initially started training to be a teacher. However, a classmate, Mike Leigh, who would later become a renowned writer and director, persuaded him to pursue acting. Hill enrolled at the Manchester Polytechnic School of Drama at the same time as Richard Griffiths. In 1970, Hill graduated with a Diploma in Theatre.

== Career ==
=== 1980–1989: Rise to prominence ===
Hill first came to prominence in 1980 as Yosser Hughes, a working-class Liverpudlian man ultimately driven to the edge by an uncaring welfare system, in Alan Bleasdale's BBC Play for Today programme, The Black Stuff, and its series sequel, Boys from the Blackstuff. His character's much-repeated phrase Gizza job ("Give us a job") became popular with protesters against Margaret Thatcher's Conservative government, because of the high unemployment of the time.

Hill then appeared as Sergeant Putnam in Gandhi (1982), directed by Richard Attenborough. Next for him was Roger Donaldson's The Bounty (1984), a fourth dramatisation of the mutiny on HMS Bounty. He had previously taken smaller parts in a number of British television dramas, appearing in I, Claudius, in 1976, as the character Gratus.

In 1985 he played the lead role in a TV dramatisation of John Lennon's life, A Journey in the Life. In addition to TV roles, Hill appeared on stage in The Cherry Orchard, as Macbeth and in A View from the Bridge. Hill appeared in Shirley Valentine (1989), as Joe Bradshaw the husband of Liverpool housewife (Pauline Collins), a former anti-establishment rebel who engages in an extramarital affair. Hill added more prominent films to his resume, including Mountains of the Moon (1990), Skallagrigg (1994) and Madagascar Skin (1995).

=== 1990–2009: Blockbuster and franchise roles ===
In the mid-1990s, Hill began appearing in films more regularly. His first major role came in The Ghost and the Darkness (1996), starring Val Kilmer and Michael Douglas. Hill then portrayed Captain Edward J. Smith in Titanic (1997), by James Cameron. He then played Luther Plunkitt, the Warden of San Quentin Prison, in the Clint Eastwood film True Crime (1999).

Hill played Philos in The Scorpion King (2002), starring Dwayne "The Rock" Johnson, Michael Clarke Duncan and Kelly Hu. Hill played King Théoden of Rohan in the second and third installments of Peter Jackson's epic trilogy, The Lord of the Rings, which were released in 2002 and 2003 respectively. Hill played a minor role in the 2008 film Valkyrie, as the commanding general of the 10th Panzer Division of the German Afrika Korps, and was a voice actor for the character Sir Walter Beck in the video game Fable III (2010).

=== 2010–2024: Later work and final roles ===
Hill was the voice of The Judge in the American animated comedy horror film ParaNorman in 2012. He played Samuel Cotton, who ran a sweet factory with his son in the 2014 three-part BBC drama series about Manchester From There to Here.

Hill appeared as Thomas Howard, 3rd Duke of Norfolk, in the 2015 six-part BBC adaptation of Hilary Mantel's novels, Wolf Hall. Later in 2015, he starred as John Claridge in the British gangster movie North v South.

== Personal life ==
Hill had a daughter from a relationship with Sue Allen and a son from a relationship with Annabel Turner.

Hill was a longtime supporter of Manchester United. In 2019, he received an honorary degree from the University of East Anglia.

Hill, who was living in Reydon, Suffolk, died on 5 May 2024, aged 79. Tributes were paid to him by his Lord of the Rings trilogy co-stars, Boys from the Blackstuff writer Alan Bleasdale, and musician Barbara Dickson.

== Acting credits ==
=== Film ===
Year	Film	Role	Notes	Ref.
1975	It Could Happen to You	Syph	Aka Intimate Teenage Secrets	
1976	Trial by Combat	Blind Freddie	Aka Dirty Knights Work	
1978	The Sailor's Return	Carter		
1978	The Spongers	Sullivan		
1982	Gandhi	Sergeant Putnam		
1983	Squaring the Circle	Lech Walesa	Documentary	
1983	Runners	Trevor Field		
1984	The Bounty	Cole		
1985	Restless Natives	Will's father		
1985	The Chain	Nick		
1985	Samson and Delilah	Willie Naknervis		
1986	Milwr Bychan	Officer	Aka Boy Soldier	
1986	New World	John Billington		
1986	No Surrender	Bernard		
1987	Bellman and True	Hiller		
1988	Drowning by Numbers	Henry Madgett		
1989	Shirley Valentine	Joe Bradshaw		
1990	Mountains of the Moon	Dr. David Livingstone		
1991	The Law Lord	Martin Allport		
1992	The Name of the Game	Ignatius "Iggy" Smith	Aka: Run Rabbit Run and Double X	
1993	Shepherd on the Rock	Tam Ferrier		
1994	Skallagrigg	John		
1994	Drug Taking and the Arts	Presenter and narrator	Documentary	
1995	Madagascar Skin	Flint		
1996	The Ghost and the Darkness	David Hawthorne		
1996	The Wind in the Willows	Engine driver	Aka Mr. Toad's Wild Ride	
1997	Titanic	Captain Edward J. Smith		
1999	The Criminal	Det. Insp. Walker		
1999	True Crime	Lunther Plunkitt		
1999	A Midsummer Night's Dream	Egeus		
1999	The Loss of Sexual Innocence	Susan's father		
2000	Blessed Art Thou	Frederick		
2000	Eisenstein	Stalin	Voice only; Aka The Furnace	
2000	Going Off Big Time	Murray		
2002	The Scorpion King	Philos		
2002	The Lord of the Rings: The Two Towers	King Théoden		
2003	The Boys from County Clare	John Joe		
2003	Gothika	Phil Parsons		
2003	The Lord of the Rings: The Return of the King	King Théoden		
2004	Wimbledon	Edward Colt		
2004	The Deal	Victor	Short film	
2005	The League of Gentlemen's Apocalypse	King William III		
2006	Joy Division	Dennis		
2006	Save Angel Hope	Oscar Kurz		
2007	Exodus	Pharoah Mann	Broadcast on Channel 4	
2008	Valkyrie	Wolfgang Fischer		
2008	Franklyn	Peter Esser		
2011	The Wraith	The Narrator	Short film	
2012	ParaNorman	The Judge	Voice only	
2015	North v South	John Claridge		
2016	Golden Years	Arthur Goode		
2016	Interlude City	Richard		
2018	Second Chance	Peter		
2023	Forever Young	Oscar Smith		
2023	The Moor	Thornley		

=== Television ===
Year	Programme	Role	Episodes	Ref.
1973	Hard Labour	Edward Thornley		
1976	I, Claudius	Gratus	2 episodes	
1977	Our Flesh and Blood	Bernard Blencoe		
1978	Pickersgill People	Harry 'Sharky' Finn	Episode: "Under the Moon of Love"	
1979	Telford's Change	Jack Burton	2 episodes	
1979	Play for Today	Yosser Hughes	Episode: "The Black Stuff"	
1980	Fox	Vin Fox	13 episodes	
1982	Boys from the Blackstuff	Yosser Hughes	5 episodes	
1983	BBC Television Shakespeare	Duke of York/First Murderer / Sir William Brandon	Four episodes (Note: Henry VI, Part 1/Henry VI, Part 2/Henry VI, Part 3/Richard III)	
1984	Antigone	Messenger		
1985	The Burston Rebellion	Tom Higdon	Part of: Screen Two	
1985	John Lennon: A Journey in the Life	John Lennon	TV Movie	
1993	Olly's Prison	Mike	TV Movie	
1993	Telltale	Det. Sgt. Gavin Douglas	3 episodes	
1993	Lipstick on Your Collar	Uncle Fred	6 episodes	
1994	Once Upon a Time in the North	Len Tollit	6 episodes	
1995	The Gambling Man	Frank Nickle	3 episodes	
1997	The Mill on the Floss	Mr Tulliver	Television film	
1999	Great Expectations	Abel Magwitch	TV Movie	
1999	The Titanic Chronicles	Captain Stanley Lord (voice)		
2001	Horizon	Narrator		
2002	Timewatch	Narrator		
2004	Atheism: A Rough History of Disbelief	Himself		
2005	A Very Social Secretary	David Blunkett	TV Movie	
2006	Ocean Odyssey	Narrator		
2007	Egomania	Narrator		
2007	Bombay Railway	Narrator		
2008	Sunshine	Granddad George Crosby		
2008	Wild China	Narrator	Documentary Series	
2009	Folk America	Narrator		
2009	Ice Patrol	Narrator	National Geographic	
2010	Old Trafford 100 Years	Narrator and Presenter		
2010	Five Days	Gerard Hopkirk		
2010	Indian Hill Railways	Narrator		
2010	Canoe Man	John Darwin		
2012	Falcón	Ramón Salgado	Episode: "The Blind Man of Seville"	
2014	From There to Here	Samuel Cotton		
2014	Hope And Wire	Len Russell	New Zealand mini-series	
2015	Wolf Hall	Duke of Norfolk	Miniseries	
2015	India's Frontier Railways	Narrator		
2015	Unforgotten	Father Robert Greaves		
2024	The Responder	Tom Carson	Posthumous release	

=== Theatre ===
Year	Play	Role	Theatre	Ref.
1974	John, Paul, George, Ringo ... and Bert	John Lennon	Everyman Theatre, Liverpool	
1978	Twelfth Night	Toby Belch	Young Vic, London	
1983	Short List	Howard	Hampstead Theatre, London	
1984	The Plough and the Stars	Fluther Good	Royal Exchange, Manchester	
1986	Macbeth	Macbeth	Haymarket Theatre, Leicester	
1989	The Cherry Orchard	Lopakhin	Aldwych Theatre, London	
1990	Gasping	Sir Chiffley Lockheart	Theatre Royal, Haymarket, London	
1995	A View from the Bridge	Eddie Carbone	Strand Theatre, London	

== Awards and nominations ==
His appearances in Titanic and The Lord of the Rings: The Return of the King (2003), two of only three films to receive 11 Academy Awards, made him the only actor to have appeared in more than one film which hold that distinction.

Organizations	Year	Category	Work	Result	Ref.
Actor Awards	1997	Outstanding Cast in a Motion Picture	Titanic	Nominated	
Actor Awards	2002	Outstanding Cast in a Motion Picture	The Lord of the Rings: The Two Towers	Nominated	
Actor Awards	2003	Outstanding Cast in a Motion Picture	The Lord of the Rings: The Return of the King	Won	
BAFTA TV Awards	1982	Best Actor	Boys from the Blackstuff	Nominated	
BAFTA TV Awards	2005	Best Actor	A Very Social Secretary	Nominated	
Broadcasting Press Guild	1982	Best Actor	Boys from the Blackstuff	Won	
Critics' Choice Movie Awards	2003	Best Cast	The Lord of the Rings: The Return of the King	Won	
International Emmy Award	2005	Best Performance by an Actor	A Very Social Secretary	Nominated	
