= The Responder =

British police procedural television series

- Genre: Police procedural
- Created by: Tony Schumacher
- Written by: Tony Schumacher
- Directed by: Tim Mielants; Philip Barantini; Fien Troch; Mounia Akl
- Starring: Martin Freeman; Adelayo Adedayo; Warren Brown; MyAnna Buring; Emily Fairn; Josh Finan; Faye McKeever; Philip S. McGuinness; Mark Womack; Rita Tushingham; Ian Hart; Amaka Okafor; Izuka Hoyle; Adam Nagaitis; Bernard Hill
- Composer: Matthew Herbert
- Country of origin: United Kingdom
- Original language: English
- No. of series: 2
- No. of episodes: 10 (list of episodes)

Production
- Executive producers: Laurence Bowen; Chris Carey; Martin Freeman
- Producer: Rebecca Ferguson
- Running time: 60 minutes
- Production company: Dancing Ledge Productions

Original release
- Network: BBC One
- Release: 24 January 2022 – 5 May 2024

The Responder is a British police procedural television series set in Liverpool, written by former Merseyside Police officer Tony Schumacher, with Tim Mielants as leading director and starring Martin Freeman, Adelayo Adedayo, Ian Hart, and MyAnna Buring. It aired on BBC One on 24 January 2022. Schumacher has said that the character has "a lot to do" with him and the struggles he faced as a police officer but that the storyline is fictional.

In late March 2022, the show was renewed for a second series, consisting of five episodes, which began airing on BBC One and BBC iPlayer on 5 May 2024. The second series marked the final acting performance of Bernard Hill, who died the day of its release.

== Premise ==
Chris Carson is a police officer in a fictional constabulary covering Liverpool, who has been demoted from his position as an inspector and undertakes a series of night shifts in the city centre. He is a conflicted and compromised man, with somewhat divided loyalties, a desire to do good, but with anger issues brought on by childhood trauma and exacerbated by his experience in the police. Shots of him working are interspersed with scenes at therapy, at home, with his mother in a nursing home, or visiting his estranged father. His partner is Rachel Hargreaves, an inexperienced and idealistic officer who wants to play by the rules but who ultimately dislikes her job.

Series 1

Carl Sweeney is a mid-level drug dealer whose stash of cocaine has been stolen by Casey, a local drug addict. Chris is trying to help Casey and in doing so crosses Carl. Marco is a young friend of Casey's who struggles to meet his daily needs. Chris is pursued by the officer responsible for his demotion, whose motives may not be entirely honest, as part of a corruption probe. The effects of the job and Chris's mental state take a toll on his family.

Series 2

== Cast and characters ==
Main

- Martin Freeman as PC Chris Carson
- Adelayo Adedayo as PC Rachel Hargreaves, a probationary police officer
- Warren Brown as Raymond Mullen, a demoted officer with an axe to grind
- MyAnna Buring as Kate Carson, Chris's wife
- Emily Fairn as Casey, a drug addict
- Josh Finan as Marco, Casey's friend
- Philip S. McGuinness as Ian, Carl's henchman
- Mark Womack as Barry, Carl's henchman
- Ian Hart as Carl Sweeney, a drug dealer
- Rita Tushingham as June Carson, Chris's mother
- Steve O'Keefe as the angry taxi driver
- Kerrie Hayes as Ellie Mullen, Raymond's wife and Kate's best friend
- Faye McKeever as Jodie Sweeney, Carl's wife
- David Bradley as Davey, a local homeless man
- Christine Tremarco as Diane Gallagher, Greg's sister
- Amaka Okafor as DCI Deborah Barnes, Chris's boss
- James Nelson-Joyce as Greg Gallagher, a drug lord
- Bernard Hill as Tom Carson

Recurring

- Elizabeth Berrington as Lynne Renfrew, Chris's therapist
- Philip Barantini as Steve, Rachel's boyfriend
- Philip Whitchurch as Joe, Casey's grandfather
- Romi Hyland-Rylands as Tilly Carson, Chris and Kate's daughter

Guest

- Victor McGuire as Trevor
- Dominic Carter as Bernie Wilson
- Matthew Cottle as Father Liam Neeson
- Dave Hill as Billy
- Sylvie Gatrill as Mary
- Sonny Walker as Stevo Marsh
- James Ledsham as Enno
- Connor Dempsey as Kyle
- David Ayres as Andy
- Kieron Urquhart as Paul
- Harry Burke as Liam
- Sue Johnston as Madge
- Austin Haynes as Danny

== Episodes ==
=== Series 1 (2022) ===
No. overall	No. in series	Title	Directed by	Written by	Original release date
1	1	"Episode 1"	Tim Mielants	Tony Schumacher	24 January 2022
2	2	"Episode 2"	Tim Mielants	Tony Schumacher	24 January 2022
3	3	"Episode 3"	Fien Troch	Tony Schumacher	24 January 2022
4	4	"Episode 4"	Fien Troch	Tony Schumacher	24 January 2022
5	5	"Episode 5"	Philip Barantini	Tony Schumacher	24 January 2022

=== Series 2 (2024) ===
No. overall	No. in series	Title	Directed by	Written by	Original release date
6	1	"Episode 1"	Jeanette Nordahl	Tony Schumacher	5 May 2024
7	2	"Episode 2"	Jeanette Nordahl	Tony Schumacher	5 May 2024
8	3	"Episode 3"	Mounia Akl	Tony Schumacher	5 May 2024
9	4	"Episode 4"	Mounia Akl	Tony Schumacher	5 May 2024
10	5	"Episode 5"	Mounia Akl	Tony Schumacher	5 May 2024

== Release ==
The series premiered on BBC One on 24 January 2022.

In some international territories, the series was broadcast in a re-edited form consisting of two series of six episodes.

The series was shown by Canal Plus in France. In Australia, the first season aired on SBS TV and SBS On Demand.

The first episode was watched 6,164,000 times on iPlayer alone during 2022, making it the third most-viewed individual programme on the platform that year.

The original soundtrack, composed by Matthew Herbert, was released by Accidental Editions in March 2022 and includes eighteen tracks.

== Reception ==
=== Critical response ===
The review aggregator Rotten Tomatoes gave the first series a 100% approval rating, with an average rating of 8.8/10, based on 23 reviews. The critics' consensus reads: "The Responder is unrelentingly dark and inescapably absorbing, with Martin Freeman's hangdog performance carrying the drama". On Metacritic, the series has a weighted average score of 87 out of 100, based on 7 reviews.

Rotten Tomatoes gave series 2 a 100% approval rating, with an average rating of 9.6/10, based on 15 reviews. The critics' consensus reads: "Putting Martin Freeman's character through the absolute ringer [sic], this second season proves to be as battered, bruised, and resilient as its compelling antihero". On Metacritic, the series has a weighted average score of 90 out of 100, based on 6 reviews.

=== Accolades ===
Year	Award	Category	Nominee(s)	Result	Ref.
2022	Edinburgh TV Awards	Best Drama	The Responder	Won	
2023	Royal Television Society Programme Awards	Drama Series	The Responder	Nominated	
2023	Royal Television Society Programme Awards	Supporting Actor – Female	Adelayo Adedayo	Nominated	
2023	British Academy Television Awards	Best Drama Series	Chris Carey, Laurence Bowen, Tony Schumacher, Tim Mielants, Rebecca Ferguson, Toby Bruce	Nominated	
2023	British Academy Television Awards	Best Actor	Martin Freeman	Nominated	
2023	British Academy Television Awards	Best Supporting Actor	Josh Finan	Nominated	
2023	British Academy Television Awards	Best Supporting Actress	Adelayo Adedayo	Nominated	
2023	British Academy Television Craft Awards	Best Original Music: Fiction	Matthew Herbert	Nominated	
2023	British Academy Television Craft Awards	Best Writer: Drama	Tony Schumacher	Nominated	
2023	International Emmy Awards	Best Actor	Martin Freeman	Won	
