= Gratus =

1st century AD Roman soldier and member of the Praetorian Guard

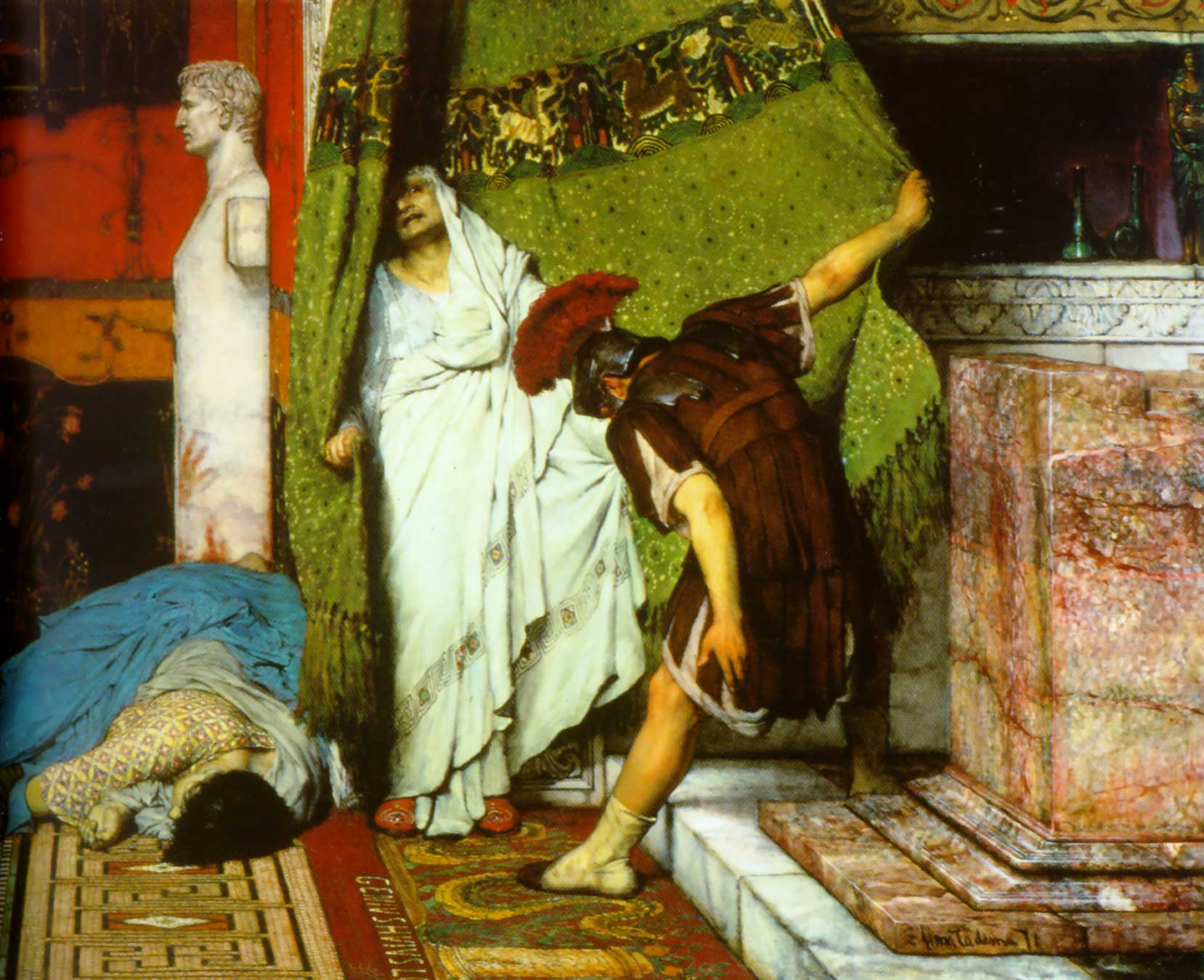
Gratus proclaims Claudius emperor. Detail from A Roman Emperor 41AD, by Lawrence Alma-Tadema. Oil on canvas, c. 1871.

Gratus was a Roman soldier and member of the Praetorian Guard, who played a part in the accession of Claudius to the imperial throne.

In the immediate aftermath of the assassination of Caligula in AD 41, Claudius fled and hid himself in the palace near a room Suetonius names as the Hermaeum. Anthony Barrett suggests that this may have been the Aula Isiaca, a room in the east wing of the palace decorated with Egyptian motifs. Josephus describes how Gratus discovered him and drew him from his hiding place:

But when Gratus, who was one of the soldiers that belonged to the palace, saw him, but did not well know by his countenance who he was, because it was dark, though he could well judge that it was a man who was privately there on some design, he came nearer to him; and when Claudius desired that he would retire, he discovered who he was, and owned him to be Claudius. So he said to his followers, "This is a Germanicus; come on, let us choose him for our emperor."

In hailing him as "Germanicus," Gratus was evoking the memory of Claudius' older brother, who was still popular among the troops. Though initially apprehensive about his safety, Claudius accompanied Gratus and his fellow guards to the Praetorian camp, where he was ultimately proclaimed Emperor. Barbara Levick suggests that, rather than stumbling upon him accidentally, Gratus may have been actively searching for Claudius as part of a faction intent on putting him on the throne.

Gratus appears as a minor character in Robert Graves' novel I, Claudius. In the BBC TV adaptation he was portrayed by Bernard Hill.
