= Boys from the Blackstuff (play) =

Play by James Graham (2023)

- Written by: James Graham
- Genre: Drama

Premiere
- Date: 22 September 2023
- Place: Royal Court, Liverpool
- Directed by: Kate Wasserberg

Boys from the Blackstuff is a play based on the TV series by Alan Bleasdale, adapted for the stage by James Graham. The play was originally performed in 2023 at the Royal Court Theatre, Liverpool. In 2024 the play returned to the Royal Court before a transfer to London at the National Theatre's Olivier Theatre and Garrick Theatre.

== Principal roles and cast ==
| Character | Royal Court, Liverpool | Royal Court, Liverpool Olivier Theatre Garrick Theatre |
| Character | 2023 | 2024 |
|---|---|---|
| Snowy, Kevin, Scotty | George Caple | George Caple |
| George Malone | Andrew Schofield | Philip Whitchurch |
| Moss, Clerk, Redundant Worker, Protestant Minister, Milkman | Oliver Mawdsley | Jamie Peacock |
| Molloy, Marley, Catholic Priest | Dominic Carter | Dominic Carter |
| Christopher "Chrissie" Todd | Nathan McMullen | Nathan McMullen |
| Loggo Lomond | Aron Julius | Aron Julius |
| Dixie Dean | Mark Womack | Mark Womack |
| Yosser Hughes | Barry Sloane | Barry Sloane |
| Miss Sutcliffe, Freda, Margaret | Helen Carter | Helen Carter |
| Angie, Jean, Lawton, Student, Lollipop Lady, Clerk | Lauren O'Neil | Lauren O'Neil |
