= The Cage (TV series) =

British television series

- Genre: Crime thriller
- Created by: Tony Schumacher
- Written by: Tony Schumacher
- Directed by: Al Mackay
- Starring: Sheridan Smith; Michael Socha; Barry Sloane; Geraldine James; Sue Jenkins
- Country of origin: United Kingdom
- Original language: English
- No. of series: 1
- No. of episodes: 5

Production
- Executive producers: Tony Schumacher; Hilary Martin; Christopher Aird; Ed Guiney; Andrew Lowe; Sheridan Smith
- Producer: Clare Shephard
- Running time: 56-59 minutes
- Production company: Element Pictures

Original release
- Network: BBC One
- Release: 26 April – 18 May 2026

The Cage is a British crime thriller television miniseries created by Tony Schumacher, and starring Sheridan Smith and Michael Socha. The five-part series premiered on BBC One on 26 April 2026 and was on the same day made available on the BBC iPlayer. It was reported in September 2026 that a second series was not going to be commissioned.

== Synopsis ==
Two casino workers in Liverpool, Leanne and Matty, realise they have both been embezzling profits from the casino they work at. Unknown to both of them, the casino itself is a front for money laundering and the police are already watching the casino, while the casino managers try to establish who is stealing their own stolen money.

== Cast ==
Members of the cast include:

- Sheridan Smith as Leanne
- Michael Socha as Matty
- Barry Sloane as Gary
- Geraldine James as Nancy
- Sue Jenkins as Shelagh
- Anton Bibby as Thomas
- Freya Jones as Emily
- Sophie Mensah as Ning
- Abby Mavers as Kelly
- Shaun Mason as Alan
- Louis Emerick as Paul
- Ian Puleston-Davies as Vincent
- Julia Papp as Irina
- Katy Carmichael as DCI Hannigan
- Dave Hart as Danny
- Johnny Schumacher as Pit Boss
- Eileen O'Brien as Nanna
- Eithne Browne as Annie
- Mona Goodwin as Trace
- Gemma Barraclough as Jade
- Max Ainsworth as Neil
- Menyee Lai as Mai
- Isobel Khan as Paige

== Production ==
The series is written by Tony Schumacher and produced by Element Pictures. Hilary Martin, Christopher Aird, Ed Guiney and Andrew Lowe are executing producers alongside Schumacher and Sheridan Smith, who leads the cast alongside Michael Socha. Lucy Richer is an executive producer for the BBC with Clare Shepherd as series producer. The series is directed by Al Mackay.

Filming for the five-part series took place in locations around Liverpool and Merseyside, including the Wirral, in the first part of 2025.

== Broadcast ==
The series began airing on BBC One and was made available on the BBC iPlayer on 26 April 2026.

It premiered on ABC Television and ABC iview in Australia on 30 August 2026.

== Episodes ==
No.	Episode	Directed by	Written by	Original release date	UK viewers (millions)
1	Episode 1	Al Mackay	Tony Schumacher	26 April 2026	N/A
2	Episode 2	Al Mackay	Tony Schumacher	3 May 2026	N/A
3	Episode 3	Al Mackay	Tony Schumacher	10 May 2026	N/A
4	Episode 4	Al Mackay	Tony Schumacher	17 May 2026	N/A
5	Episode 5	Al Mackay	Tony Schumacher	18 May 2026	N/A

== Reception ==
In a five-star review in The Guardian, Lucy Mangan described the series as "an astonishing, deeply angry, deeply moving state-of-the-nation piece merely masquerading as a mesmerising, perfectly paced and plotted thriller". Metro's reviewer considered it to be "one of the most impressive British thrillers in years" and gave it four stars. By contrast, the three-star review in The Independent concluded that "The Cage feels like its heroes: sweet and simple, not bad but not terribly good either."
