= Penthouse North =

- Spanish theatrical release poster
- Directed by: Joseph Ruben
- Written by: David Loughery
- Produced by: Joseph Ruben; David Loughery; Michael Baker; Robert Menzies; Jeff Sackman
- Starring: Michael Keaton; Michelle Monaghan; Barry Sloane
- Cinematography: Chris Seager
- Edited by: Andrew Mondshein
- Music by: Mark Mancina
- Production companies: Demarest Films; TAJJ Media; Bunk 11 Pictures; Kilburn Media; Lionsgate
- Distributed by: Dimension Films (United States); Lionsgate (International)
- Release dates: October 2013 (Ottawa); January 4, 2014
- Running time: 86 minutes
- Country: United States
- Language: English

Penthouse North (also known as Blindsided) is a 2013 American thriller film directed by Joseph Ruben, starring Michael Keaton and Michelle Monaghan.

== Plot ==
Sara Frost is a photojournalist stationed in Afghanistan. She enters a building, in which she sees a woman crying for help. She raises her camera to take a photo of the woman before realizing that the baby the woman is carrying is actually a bomb. The bomb explodes, leaving Sara permanently blind.

Sara returns to America, where her live-in boyfriend, Ryan, is desperate to marry her. Sara is planning a party and goes out to buy some supplies when she is knocked over by a cyclist. When she gets home Ryan appears to have stepped out - Sara is unable to see his murdered body. When she takes a shower, Ryan's killer is revealed to still be in the house, using his blade to push a towel in Sara's direction when she cannot find one.

Sara discovers Ryan's body when she slips in his blood. The killer makes himself known and ties Sara to her bed, asking for "the diamond" which Ryan stole from him. Sara is shocked by the revelation that Ryan is not the man he made himself out to be. She offers the killer, now known as Chad, the diamond, but then knocks him out and escapes the apartment. She hides in her building's basement where her friend Antonio hears her calls for help. He tries to save her but Chad slits his throat. Sara escapes to the street when she trips into the arms of Robert Hollander, who promises to keep her safe.

They retreat to her building and it is revealed that Chad knows Hollander and they are working together to find the diamonds. They find a case of hundreds of thousands of dollars hidden behind a canvassed photo that Sara took. Having confirmed that Ryan was a crook, Hollander and Chad renew their efforts, certain that the diamonds are hidden somewhere in the penthouse. Hollander throws Sara's cat over the balcony in a fit of spite before locking Sara up again. She tries to reason with Chad, then turns her attentions to Hollander, desperate to end the torment.

Blake, Sara's sister, comes over with her husband, Danny, for the party Sara was preparing for earlier. Sara gets them to leave with a story that she and Ryan are fighting, and coincidentally Blake, who is heavily pregnant, starts having contractions. Hollander sends Chad to fix him a drink while he takes Sara out to the balcony. Chad discovers the diamonds hidden within the ice cubes and hides them away before offering Hollander his drink. Chad attempts to kill Hollander but is shot by Hollander. With Hollander's attention on Chad, Sara stabs Hollander in the back with a garden shear. As Hollander grapples with Sara, Chad revives and attacks Hollander, who grabs Chad's blade and stabs him to death. Hollander searches for Sara, who has found Hollander's gun. She tries shooting him using her sense of hearing, but New Year's Eve fireworks dull her senses, giving her a flashback to the moment she lost her sight in Afghanistan.

Sara manages to shoot Hollander in the arm. With the gun pointed directly at him she starts throwing the diamonds over the balcony, threatening to throw all of them away. When Hollander reacts, she is able to hear him and shoots him in the chest before pushing him off the balcony to his death.

It is revealed that Sara had kept the diamonds in her hand. She re-freezes them in the ice tray, while her cat is seen walking over Hollander's corpse on the ground below.

== Cast ==
- Michelle Monaghan as Sara Frost
- Michael Keaton as Robert Hollander
- Barry Sloane as Chad
- Kaniehtiio Horn as Blake
- Trevor Hayes as Danny
- Andrew W. Walker as Ryan
- Phillip Jarrett as Antonio

== Production ==
Filming started on December 7, 2011, in Ottawa, Ontario.

== Release ==
Penthouse North was released internationally and premiered in the US on Lifetime.

== Reception ==
Nathan Rabin of The Dissolve called it a "suspense-free thriller of staggering mediocrity" and an example of Keaton's unimpressive work prior to Birdman. Ben Sachs of the Chicago Reader described it as "a terse but nicely shaded crime movie that evokes superior 50s B noirs". Sachs recommended it to fans of Keaton and wrote that it plays to his strengths as an actor: playing quick-thinking characters forced to react to unexpected situations.
