= Tony Schumacher (English author) =

English actor, novelist, screenwriter (born 1967)

- Born: 16 May 1967 (age 59); Huyton, Merseyside, England, U.K.
- Occupations: Actor; novelist; screenwriter
- Known for: The Responder; The Cage

Tony Schumacher (born 16 May 1967) is an English actor, novelist, and screenwriter, best known for creating the BBC One police drama The Responder, starring Martin Freeman.

== Early life ==
Schumacher was born in Huyton in 1967. Before his career as a writer, he worked as a police officer and taxi driver in nearby Liverpool.

== Career ==
Schumacher became a writer after obtaining a commission from Angie Sammons, the then-editor of Liverpool Confidential.

Schumacher's first novel, the alternate-history book The Darkest Hour, is set in a 1940s-era UK after a hypothetical Nazi victory in World War II. It was generally well received. His second book, The British Lion, was released by the William Morrow imprint of HarperCollins, and was also well received in both the United States and the UK. An Army of One, the third novel in the John Rossett series, was published in August 2017.

Schumacher self-published several other books, including Rear View Mirror: Stories from the Streets and the Night, which recounts tales of his time as a police officer and taxi driver. He also acted in small roles, such as in the film Route Irish.

Schumacher moved into screenwriting, taking part in the BBC Writersroom Northern Voices Scheme in 2018, followed by the ScreenSkills New Writers Programme in 2019. There, he would be mentored by Jimmy McGovern. Schumacher wrote on Clink, produced by McGovern's LA Productions, and created The Responder, which began airing on 24 January 2022, influenced by his days as a police officer in Liverpool. The series received critical acclaim and was renewed for a second series.

Filming began in and around Liverpool on his new BBC One series The Cage in 2025. The series premiered on 26 April 2026.

== Personal life ==
Divorced from his first wife, Schumacher remarried. The couple have a son.

== See also ==
- List of English actors
- List of English novelists
- List of people from Merseyside
