= Jasmine Bayes =

British actress

- Education: Guildford School of Acting
- Occupation: Actress
- Years active: 2021–present
- Television: Casualty

Jasmine Bayes is a British actress. After graduating from the Guildford School of Acting, she began making various appearances in television series including Platform 7, Father Brown, Vera and Doctor Who. In 2026, Bayes portrayed Kim Chang in the BBC medical drama series Casualty.

== Life and career ==
Bayes attended Kimbolton School, graduating in 2018. After leaving, she studied musical theatre at the Guildford School of Acting, graduating in 2021.

In 2023, Bayes made her television debut in an episode of the ITVX series Platform 7. That same year, she appeared in an episode of the BBC period series Father Brown, as well as a role in ITV1's Vera in 2024. Also in 2024, Bayes portrayed Corporal Alice Sullivan in two episodes of the BBC flagship series Doctor Who.

In 2025, Bayes was cast in the BBC medical drama series Casualty. Her character, doctor Kim Chang, first appeared in the episode broadcast on 10 January 2026. Her character appeared until April of that year, with her main story arc revolving around having an eating disorder that she eventually dies from. Also in 2026, Bayes appeared in the second series of Hijack. She also returned to the Doctor Who universe, this time as companion Eleanor Fong in the audio drama The Eleventh Doctor Adventures.

== Filmography ==
Year	Title	Role	Notes
2023	Platform 7	Helen	Guest role
2023	Father Brown	Susan Payne	Episode: "The Hermit of Hazelnut Cottage"
2024	Vera	Rachel Lim	Episode: "Salt & Vinegar"
2024	Doctor Who	Corporal Alice Sullivan	Episodes: "Empire of Death" and "The Legend of Ruby Sunday"
2026	Hijack	Mei Tan	Recurring role
2026	Casualty	Kim Chang	Main role
2026	The Eleventh Doctor Adventures	Eleanor Fong (voice)	Main role

== Stage ==
Year	Title	Role	Venue
2021	The Wild Party	Dolores Montoya	Guildford School of Acting
2023	My Neighbour Totoro	Kazego / Cover Kaze No Koe	Barbican Centre
