= Joseph Ruben =

American filmmaker (born 1950)

- Born: May 10, 1950 (age 76); Chicago, Illinois, U.S.
- Occupations: Film director, screenwriter, producer
- Years active: 1974–2017

Joseph Porter Ruben (born May 10, 1950) is an American retired filmmaker. He is best known for directing The Stepfather (1987) and Sleeping with the Enemy (1991).

== Movie career ==
Ruben's earlier films, such as The Stepfather, have become cult classics. In the 1990s, he went to direct high-grossing mainstream films such as Sleeping with the Enemy starring Julia Roberts (which grossed over $150,000,000 on box office), the controversial thriller The Good Son starring Macaulay Culkin and Elijah Wood, Money Train starring Woody Harrelson and Wesley Snipes, and Return to Paradise starring Vince Vaughn and Joaquin Phoenix. He frequently collaborated with film editor George Bowers.

Ruben has won awards at various film festivals for his films The Stepfather, True Believer, starring Robert Downey Jr. and James Woods, and Dreamscape, starring Dennis Quaid. His 2013 feature, Penthouse North, stars Michael Keaton and Michelle Monaghan. He will return to direct the serial killer thriller Jack after not working for six years. Ruben is also attached to direct the film The Politician's Wife written by Nicholas Meyer.

The Ottoman Lieutenant was released around the period of the film The Promise, a film depicting the Armenian genocide. The perceived similarities between the films resulted in accusations that The Ottoman Lieutenant existed to deny the Armenian genocide.

== Filmography ==
Film

Year	Title	Director	Producer	Writer
1974	The Sister-in-Law	Yes	Yes	Yes
1976	The Pom Pom Girls	Yes	Yes	Yes
1977	Joyride	Yes	No	Yes
1978	Our Winning Season	Yes	No	No
1980	Gorp	Yes	No	No
1984	Dreamscape	Yes	No	Yes
1987	The Stepfather	Yes	No	No
1989	True Believer	Yes	No	No
1991	Sleeping with the Enemy	Yes	No	No
1993	The Good Son	Yes	Yes	No
1995	Money Train	Yes	No	No
1998	Return to Paradise	Yes	No	No
2004	The Forgotten	Yes	No	No
2013	Penthouse North	Yes	Yes	No
2017	The Ottoman Lieutenant	Yes	No	No

Television

Year	Title	Note
1980	Breaking Away	Episode "The Cutters"
