= Yosser Hughes =

Character in Boys from the Blackstuff

- First appearance: The Black Stuff; 1980
- Last appearance: Boys from the Blackstuff; 1982
- Created by: Alan Bleasdale
- Portrayed by: Bernard Hill (1982); Barry Sloane (2023); Jay Johnson (2025)

In-universe information
- Full name: Jimmy Hughes
- Nickname: Yosser
- Occupation: Unemployed (construction worker)
- Spouse: Maureen
- Children: 3
- Nationality: British

Jimmy "Yosser" Hughes is a fictional character from Alan Bleasdale's 1982 (written in 1978) television series Boys from the Blackstuff, set in Liverpool. He is portrayed by Bernard Hill.

== Appearance and family ==
Yosser is a tall man in his mid-30s who wears predominantly black clothes and has a distinctive bushy moustache. He always appears unkempt and unshaven. His wife, Maureen, is an aggressive, unloving harridan who frequently berated him and who had an affair with another man, the likely father of their three children (played in the drama by Alan Bleasdale's own children).

== Pilot episode ==
The pilot of Blackstuff implies that Hughes worked in the Middle East at some time during the 1970s and later bought a house that was beyond the family's means. In the original pilot episode, he appears comparatively sane, but displays macho insecurities that make his redundancy especially hard to take. When the boys are swindled out of their savings in Middlesbrough, Yosser reacts particularly badly, showing the first signs of the nervous breakdown that would characterise his behaviour in the 1982 series.

The first episode of the series sees Yosser collecting social security from a Liverpool DHSS and making an unexpected appearance at an illegal building site, organised by a corrupt Irish contractor called Molloy. When Molloy takes him to task over a badly built wall, Hughes headbutts him and kicks down the wall, storming off with his children in tow.

== Memorable episode ==
In perhaps the most memorable episode of the series, Bleasdale shows the complete disintegration of Yosser's life as his children are taken into care (after he is beaten up in his own house by four policemen), he is made homeless and finally tries to drown himself in a lake. Constantly trying to run the gauntlet of psychiatrists, social workers and creditors, Yosser makes numerous pathetic attempts to re-establish his identity and sense of self-worth, at one point gatecrashing a charity event to meet his apparent lookalike Graeme Souness. Yosser eventually ends up courting arrest by smashing a storefront window, then being arrested for headbutting one of the police officers who arrives on the scene.

Bleasdale's use of black humour is also apparent in a scene in which a distraught Yosser and his three children enter a confessional where a priest named Father Daniel Thomas is listening, and telling him "I'm desperate, Father!" When the priest tries to calm him and sympathetically urges Yosser to call him Dan, Yosser blurts out "I'm desperate, Dan!", a play on the comic character, Desperate Dan. In a September 2011 interview on Radio 4's The Reunion, Bleasdale said that he had been saving the joke for years, and that it was the "perfect joke at the perfect time".

The episode was filmed on 16mm film, in contrast to the rest of the series which was filmed on OB tape, in order to evoke a darker atmosphere, although the original TV movie The Black Stuff had also been filmed on 16mm film.

== Final episode ==
In the final episode, Yosser pays a visit to George Malone, possibly the only person to treat him with any degree of understanding, although George is now too ill to offer anything more than token advice. He has been taken in by his mother and there seems little chance that he will see his children again.

Yosser attends George's funeral and loudly sniggers at the priest's banal eulogy. In the pub afterwards, he raises a cheer when he headbutts a vicious former bouncer into unconsciousness. In the very final scene, as three of the main characters watch a controlled demolition of a Tate & Lyle factory, Yosser's hopeless refrain of "gizza job" ("give us [me] a job") became part of the nation's phrases. It is almost a requiem for the old working-class community that is being destroyed.

== Adaptation ==
Yosser was portrayed by Barry Sloane in the 2023 stage adaptation of Boys from the Blackstuff by James Graham.

== Popular references ==
The series tackled the subject of unemployment and Yosser became an icon of Thatcherite Britain in the 1980s with his catchphrase of "gizza job".
