= Boys from the Blackstuff =

1982 British television drama series

- The opening of the first episode of the series
- Genre: Drama
- Created by: Alan Bleasdale
- Directed by: Philip Saville
- Starring: Bernard Hill; Michael Angelis; Alan Igbon; Peter Kerrigan; Tom Georgeson
- Country of origin: United Kingdom
- No. of episodes: 5

Production
- Producer: Michael Wearing
- Running time: 65 mins approx
- Production company: BBC (BBC Birmingham)

Original release
- Network: BBC2
- Release: October 10 – November 7, 1982

Boys from the Blackstuff is a five episode British drama television series, originally transmitted from 10 October to 7 November 1982 on BBC2.

The serial was written by Liverpudlian playwright Alan Bleasdale, as a sequel to a television play titled The Black Stuff. The British Film Institute described it as a "seminal drama series... a warm, humorous but ultimately tragic look at the way economics affect ordinary people… TV's most complete dramatic response to the Thatcher era and as a lament to the end of a male, working class British culture."

== The Black Stuff ==
The television play The Black Stuff was originally written by Bleasdale and directed by Jim Goddard for BBC1's Play for Today anthology series in 1978. After filming, the play was not transmitted until 2 January 1980. It concerned a group of Liverpudlian tarmac layers (hence the title, 'the black stuff' being a slang term for tarmac) on a job near Middlesbrough.

The acclaim that The Black Stuff received on its eventual transmission led to the commissioning of the sequel serial, of which Bleasdale had already written a considerable amount.

== Boys from the Blackstuff ==
The series Boys from the Blackstuff follows the stories of the five now-unemployed men who lost their jobs following the events of the original play The Black Stuff. Set in Bleasdale's home city of Liverpool, and reflecting many of his own experiences of life in the city, each episode focuses on a different member of the group. The series was highly acclaimed for its powerful and emotional depiction of the desperation wrought by high unemployment and a subsequent lack of social support. Although Bleasdale wrote most of the scripts before Margaret Thatcher came to power, the series was noted by many reviewers as a critique of the early Thatcher era, which was seen as being responsible for the fate of many of the unemployed working-class, particularly in the North of England. The show was launched at a time when unemployment had reached 3 million as a result of economic recession and restructuring of industry, having topped 1 million for most of the 1970s.

The serial was made by the English regions drama department based at BBC Birmingham and was shot on location in Liverpool. The producer was Michael Wearing, who was based at Birmingham with a specific remit to make "regional drama", and who would later be instrumental in bringing the BBC's drama serials Edge of Darkness (1985) and Our Friends in the North (1996) to the screens. The writer Alan Bleasdale went on to write the scripts for The Monocled Mutineer (BBC1, 1986) and G.B.H. (Channel 4, 1991).

== Reception ==
The series was so successful upon its original broadcast that only nine weeks after it had finished transmission, it was re-shown on the higher-profile BBC1. It was also transmitted again on BBC2 as part of that station's 25th anniversary season in 1989. In 1983 it won the British Academy Television Award for Best Drama Serial, and in 2000 was placed seventh in a British Film Institute poll of industry professionals on the best television programmes of the 20th century. It was also named as one of the 40 greatest television shows in a 2003 list compiled by the Radio Times magazine's chief television writer Alison Graham. In March 2007, Channel 4 broadcast a "Top 50 Dramas" programme, based on input from industry professionals rather than the public, which had Boys from the Blackstuff at number two.

A live theatrical adaptation of the show, directed by James Graham, debuted in 2023.

== Episodes ==
=== The Black Stuff ===
The Black Stuff was the original television play directed by Jim Goddard and is the precursor to the 1982 Boys from the Blackstuff series. The main characters Yosser, Loggo, Chrissie, George, Dixie and his son, Kevin, were introduced in it. It follows the group as they set off from Liverpool to undertake a casual tarmac laying job on a new housing development in Middlesbrough. The episode was produced in 1978 but was not broadcast until 1980.

Along the way at a motorway service station, the group encounter a female student (Janine Duvitski) who hitch-hikes a lift to Leeds. Part of the group (particularly Yosser) mocks her, but Yosser's insecurity and unwillingness to be dominated by women is especially manifested after she taunts him when she is dropped off. In Middlesbrough the group are approached by two Irish gypsies, Brendan and Dominic, who offer them the chance of a side job, claiming that they had been laid off. Although initially uneasy with the idea of working with them, the group (except group leader, Dixie, and his son, Kevin), spurred by Yosser's dream of fleecing the gypsies and starting their own tarmac laying business, agree to invest vast amounts of their own savings to undertake the 'foreign' job. The group manager, McKenna, later discovers this and fires them all. However, despite being convinced that they had made the right decision, the group are nonetheless outsmarted by the gypsies who pretend they have been given a cheque (when in fact they had been paid cash) and claiming they would get the cheque cashed at a bank. Chrissie agrees to accompany Brendan in Brendan's van (who later manages to lose Chrissie by tricking him into pushing the van so as to jump-start it after pretending it had broken down), while Yosser decides to hold Dominic hostage until they return. Yosser soon discovers that cash had in fact been handed over, but Dominic manages to escape to Brendan who is waiting for him – Loggo tripping and tumbling over as he gives chase through a farmer's field.

Yosser speeds off in the group's own van and gives chase to Brendan and Dominic, who attempts to puncture Yosser's tyres by smashing empty milk bottles on the road from the back of the van. Yosser swerves and avoids them, but runs out of petrol, shouting and venting his anger by bashing his head on the steering wheel. He finds a can of petrol in the back of the van, partly refuels and sets off in vain to find the pair, before giving up on a roundabout, bringing traffic on it to a halt and breaking down in tears, ignoring the tailback and horns being blown behind him. He returns to the group after stopping by where he had abandoned a number of items from the van, headbutting a man he believes to be an Irish gypsy and kicking his companion to the ground, who protests he is neither a gypsy nor Irish and was "just hitching a lift". Yosser is clearly distressed upon his return to the group and begins to smash the tarmac they had laid with a pickaxe, but is restrained by Loggo and Chrissie before knocking Chrissie to the ground for his optimistic outlook despite what has happened. Yosser launches an emotional monologue about wanting to be rich, noticed and seen, and is clearly close to breaking point, to the extent that Loggo and George continue to restrain him from further attacking Chrissie who is on the floor with a bleeding nose. George reassures Yosser and gently advises him to grow up, but Yosser is unconvinced and kicks the grille of the van. The episode ends with the group, almost penniless, arriving at the Tees Transporter Bridge. A man whom they met earlier (when he delivered tarmac to the site) is on his way to Shetland to undertake a casual job there, and Loggo promptly chooses to join him. The episode finishes with a long-distance shot of the Tees Transporter Bridge and the opening theme song, sung by the cast, is played over the end credits.

=== Jobs for the Boys ===
Featuring most of the characters from the initial drama. They take a cash-in-hand job on a building site whilst still claiming unemployment benefit. Typical of the show's humour, it is later revealed that the building being renovated is going to be used by the Department of Employment. They are followed by the authorities and Snowy Malone (Chris Darwin), a plasterer, falls to his death trying to flee during a subsequent raid by the "sniffers" (social security officers working undercover).

=== Moonlighter ===
Follows Dixie Dean (Tom Georgeson) in his new position as a security guard, where he is strongarmed into accepting bribes for allowing the removal of goods under his charge in a docked ship. Apart from Dixie's son Kevin this episode also features Chrissie, Loggo and George, the other members of the original gang, during a scene prior to Malone's funeral.

=== Shop Thy Neighbour ===
Concentrates on Chrissie (Michael Angelis) and the domestic pressure that unemployment and the attentions of the benefit fraud officers place on him and his wife (Julie Walters). It also features his closest friend, Loggo (Alan Igbon), who is least affected by the social climate. At the end of the episode, in an act of desperation, lacking money and food, Chrissie is driven to strangle his chickens and shoot his geese in an attempt to provide dinner. He also worries about his children's rabbits.

=== Yosser's Story ===
This is the most widely discussed episode of the series, following Yosser's struggle to avoid losing his children (who are played by Alan Bleasdale's own children) to the authorities as his mental health disintegrates. It is also the only one of the series shot on 16mm film, as opposed to videotape, although the original play was also shot on this format. Footballers Graeme Souness and Sammy Lee, then of Liverpool F.C., make cameo appearances. The episode contains the often repeated scene in which Yosser goes to confession looking for help, and tells the priest he is desperate. The priest, trying to comfort Yosser, tells him "Call me Dan – Dan"; to which Yosser replies "I'm desperate, Dan".

=== George's Last Ride ===
This episode reveals something of George's (Peter Kerrigan) politically active past. His trip (Chrissie wheeling him in his chair through the docks) leads him and them to reminisce about his younger days, the contrast between his recalled hopeful youth with the abandoned industrial infrastructure around him is marked. The death of George causes the main characters to be reunited if, in some cases, only briefly. The episode concludes with a surreal scene at the Green Man pub in Liverpool.

== DVD release ==
The series, including the original play The Black Stuff was released on DVD as a three-disc set by BBC Worldwide in 2003.

A companion to the series is the book Boys from the Blackstuff, the making of TV drama, by Bob Millington and Robin Nelson.

Preceded by Brideshead Revisited	British Academy Television Awards; Best Drama Series or Serial; 1983	Succeeded by Kennedy
