= Aron Julius =

English actor

- Born: Aron Sanyika Julius; April 1995 (age 31); Liverpool, England
- Education: Royal Academy of Dramatic Art (BA)
- Occupation: Actor
- Years active: 2014–present
- Television: Puppy Love; Casualty

Aron Sanyika Julius (born April 1995) is an English actor. Following various stage appearances including Choir Boy, A Raisin in the Sun, Othello and Boys from the Blackstuff, Julius was cast in the BBC medical drama series Casualty as Matty Linlaker in 2026. He has also made various television appearances in Puppy Love, Death in Paradise and Silent Witness.

== Life and career ==
Julius was born in Liverpool, where he attended school. He garnered a passion for acting after appearing in a school production when he was 11. His grandad suggested he went to a drama school, naming the Royal Academy of Dramatic Art (RADA) as an example. Julius began appearing in various stage productions, with roles in Choir Boy at the Royal Court Theatre, a touring production of A Raisin In The Sun. He also made his television debut in BBC Four's Puppy Love, later making appearances in DCI Banks and Moving On. However, whilst in these productions, he kept meeting RADA graduates who shared their experiences with him, motivating him to eventually apply and study there. Whilst there, he appeared in various West End theatre productions, including portraying Othello in the play of the same name, as well as winning the Laurence Olivier bursary accolade. He graduated in 2019.

In 2022, Julius appeared in an episode of the BBC's Death in Paradise. That same year, he made his film debut, playing Will Goodwin in Death on the Nile. 2024 saw him return to the West End, this time appearing in a production of Boys from the Blackstuff. In 2025, he appeared in an episode of the BBC series Silent Witness. Julius was subsequently cast as Matty Linlaker on the BBC medical drama series Casualty. His first appearance aired on 10 January 2026.

== Filmography ==
Year	Title	Role	Notes
2014	Puppy Love	Eron	Main role
2015	DCI Banks	Robbie Osgood	Episode: "What Will Survive: Part 1"
2016	Moving On	Nathan	Episode: "Zero"
2022	Death in Paradise	Jason Clarke	Guest role
2022	Death on the Nile	Will Goodwin	Film role
2025	Silent Witness	Stuart	Episode: "I Believe in Love... Part 1"
2026	Casualty	Matty Linlaker	Main role

== Stage ==
- Our Day Out
- Choir Boy
- A Raisin in the Sun
- Medea
- Othello
- Limberham
- A Midsummer Night's Dream
- The Last Days of Judas Iscariot
- Linda
- Romeo and Juliet
- A Christmas Carol
- Love Liverpool
- As You Like It
- Quality Street
- Boys from the Blackstuff
