= Oliver Davis (composer) =

English composer (born 1972)

- Born: Oliver Reynolds Davis; England
- Education: Royal Academy of Music
- Occupations: Composer, pianist, singer
- Writing career
- Genres: Classical; Ballet; Film; Animation
- Notable works: Flight; Seasons; Dance; Liberty

Oliver Reynolds Davis (born January 1972) is an English composer, pianist and singer.

== Early life and studies ==
He is the son of British violinist Howard Davis and British classical harpsichordist Virginia Black.

Davis studied at the Royal Academy of Music, graduating in 1994. He has since composed and produced albums, soundtracks, concertos and television scores working with London orchestras such as the London Symphony Orchestra.

== Career ==
After graduating from the Royal Academy of Music in 1994, he initially worked in television and animation scoring, composing music for numerous series and productions before transitioning more prominently into orchestral and ballet composition. Over time, he established collaborations with major ensembles such as the London Symphony Orchestra and Royal Philharmonic Orchestra, and his works have been widely broadcast and commercially successful, frequently appearing in UK classical charts and on radio stations such as Classic FM. His music has also become successful in international ballet, with performances by leading companies including the Royal Ballet, New York City Ballet, San Francisco Ballet, and Pacific Northwest Ballet.

Davis’s classical output is extensive and spans multiple forms, including concertos, orchestral cycles, chamber works, vocal compositions, and ballet scores. His early major concert work Flight (2013), a violin concerto for solo violin and strings, marked a turning point in his concert career and later formed the basis of his debut album. This was followed by a sequence of concept albums—Seasons (2015), featuring Anno, a modern reinterpretation of The Four Seasons; Dance (2016), which incorporates rhythmically driven orchestral pieces influenced by ballet; and Liberty (2018), whose material was later adapted into choreographic works such as Bacchus. Subsequent albums expanded his catalogue further, including Arcadia (2019), Solace (2021), Air (2022), Blue (2023), and Life (2025), the latter comprising works such as Life Cycle, Biorhythms, Mortal, and Afterlife, written for combinations of violin, piano, strings, harp, and orchestra.

Alongside these recordings, Davis has produced a substantial body of standalone classical compositions. Notable works include the Dance Concerto for violin and string orchestra, The Elements for mixed ensemble, Eros and Psyche for soprano and strings, and This Mortal Man for soprano, harp, and strings.

His choral writing includes pieces such as At That Hour, while his chamber and instrumental works span solo piano pieces (e.g., Reflection) and small ensemble compositions. His compositional style is generally tonal and accessible, often built around lyrical violin writing and repetitive minimalist textures, which has contributed to his appeal in both concert and dance settings.

Davis is especially prominent in ballet composition, where his music has been used in numerous original works and choreographic adaptations. Major ballet scores include Within the Hours (2013) and Prometheus (2014) for the Royal Ballet, Flight of Fancy (2016) for Tulsa Ballet, Dance Odyssey (2018) for New York City Ballet, and The Infinite Ocean (2018) for San Francisco Ballet. Further works include Bacchus (2019) for Pacific Northwest Ballet, 13th Heaven (2019) for Singapore Dance Theatre, and The Veil Between Worlds (2019), alongside later collaborations such as Jubilate (2023), created for the coronation of King Charles III. His music has also been reused and adapted across multiple ballet productions, with choreographers frequently drawing from his recorded albums to create new works.

In addition to his concert and ballet output, Davis has composed for musical theatre (including TV22 and Thomas & Friends: The Great Race) and created sound design for experimental and film projects. His television work includes scoring more than a dozen animated series such as Poppy Cat, The Cramp Twins, and Humf, reflecting the breadth of his early career in media composition.

== Credits ==
=== Albums ===
Album	Label	Publisher	Performers	Year
Flight	Signum Records	Eaton Music	Kerenza Peacock, Huw Watkins accompanied by the London Symphony Orchestra conducted by Paul Bateman	2015
Seasons	Signum Records	Eaton Music	Kerenza Peacock, Grace Davidson accompanied by Trafalgar Sinfonia conducted by Ivor Setterfield	2015
Dance	Signum Records	Eaton Music	Kerenza Peacock, Huw Watkins accompanied by the Royal Philharmonic Orchestra and conducted by Paul Bateman.	2016
Liberty	Signum Records	Eaton Music	Kerenza Peacock, Huw Watkins, Katherine Jenkinson, Tim Ridout, Jonathan Hill, Grace Davidson. Accompanied by the Royal Philharmonic Orchestra and conducted by Paul Bateman.	2018
Arcadia	Signum Records	Eaton Music	Benjamin Baker, Huw Watkins, Kerenza Peacock, Hanke Brohers	2018
Solace	Signum Records	Eaton Music	Kerenza Peacock, Jonathan Hill, Grace Davidson, Oliver Wass, Sam Brophy, Benedict Moriarty, Sergio Puccini, Henry Hanssen, Beth & Flo, Katherine Jenkinson, Nicholas Holland, Huw Watkins, Budapest Scoring Symphonic Orchestra conducted by Péter Illényi	2021
Air	Signum Records	Eaton Music	Ben Baker, Kerenza Peacock & the Hanke Brothers	2022
Blue	Signum Records	Eaton Music	Beth & Flo, Grace Davidson, Julia Doyle, Paul Bateman.	2023
Life	Signum Records	Eaton Music	Huw Watkins, Kerenza Peacock, Benjamin Baker, Katherine Jenkinson. Accompanied by the Royal Philharmonic Orchestra conducted by Julian Kershaw	2025

=== Films and animation ===
Film	Director	Details	Year
Seaview Knights	Richard Kurtis	Full-length film starring James Bolam, Sarah Alexander and Anita Dobson	1994
Dear Nelson	Sarah Cox	Channel 4 – BAA Best Short Film Nomination	1998
How to Cope with Death (TV Short)	Ignassio Ferarez	Channel 4 – Nominated best music British Animation Awards	2002
The Girl and the Horse (short)	Rebecca Manley	Slinky Pictures – nominated for 'Best Music' BAAs 2004	2003
Inseparable Bonds (short)	Dr Frankenskippy	The Moving Picture Co.	2003
The Big Top	Rebecca Manley	Commissioned by the Hype Gallery and produced by Maria Manton for Slinky Pictures	2004
Dagmars Friend	Ian Colbart and Ian Carney		2006
Silence is Golden	Chris Sheperd	Slinky Pictures Won the 2006 TCM Classic Shorts Award at the London Film Festival	2006
Over the Hill	Peter Baynton	McLaren Award for Best New British Animation at the Edinburgh International Film Festival 2007	2007
A-Z	Sally Arthur		2007
Little Face	Matthew Walker	Winner 'Best Music' San Gio Film Festival 2008 – 3-minute AIR for Channel 4	2009
Playhouse Presents – Nelly and Melba	Christine Gernon	Sky Arts	2012
Playhouse Presents – City Hall	Richard Loncraine	Sky Arts	2012
Lifeclass (short)	Chris Shepherd	Random Acts	2013
The Ringer (short)	Chris Shepherd	Canal Plus	2013
Stick Out	Anthony Farquar Smith	Nominated for Virgin Media Shorts	2013
A Mountain to Climb	Rebecca Manley	Selected for Nowness	2015
Thomas & Friends: The Great Race	David Stoten	CGI animated musical adventure film	2016
Johnno's Dead	Chris Shepherd	Featured in the Barbican	2016
Thomas & Friends: Journey Beyond Sodor	David Stoten	CGI animation film	2017
Doozy	Richard Squires	Feature length biopic	2018

=== Television series ===
Show	Series	Director	Details	Year
Pongwiffy	Series 1 – 26 episodes	Alan Simpson	Teleimagination for CiTV	2001
Something Else	Series 1 -26 episodes	Brad Neave	Loonland	2001–2007
Metalheads	Series 1 – 6 episodes	Steve Moore	Teleimagination for CBBC	2003
The Cramp Twins	Series 2	Brian Wood	Teleimagination for Cartoon Network / BBC	2004
The Likeaballs	Series 1 – 26 episodes	Jim Quick	BBC / Cosgrove Hall for CBBC	2006
Humf	Series 1 – 78 episodes	Leo Neilson	King Rollo / E1 Kids for Nick Jr	2007
Boblins	Series 1 and 2 – 52 episodes	Dave Garbitt	Inspire GLG for CiTV currently broadcasting in over 20 countries	2008
City Hall	Series 1	Richard Loncraine	Sky Arts	2012
Skatoony	Series 1, 2 and 3 – 39 episodes	James Fox	Cartoon Network	2006–2008
Poppy Cat	Series 1 and 2 – 104 episodes	Mallory Lewis	King Rollo / Coolabi	2011–2014
The Simpsons	Couch gag	Sylvain Chomet	20th Century Fox	2014
Odd Jobbers	Series 1 – 26 episodes		CiTV	
Monsters vs Monsters	7 shorts	Ian Colbart	Nickelodeon	
Olly the Little White Van	Series 1, 2 and 3 – 65 episodes	Dave Garbitt	Channel 5	

=== Ballet ===
Ballet	Company	Choreographer	Venue	Details	Year
Prometheus	The Royal Ballet	Erico Montes	The Lindbury and St James Theatre		2014
Flight of Fancy	Tulsa Ballet	Ma Cong	Tulsa Ballet		2016
Dance Odyssey	New York City Ballet	Peter Walker	David H. Koch Theater		2018
The Infinite Ocean	San Francisco Ballet	Edwaard Liang	San Francisco Ballet	Piece commissioned for new ballet as part of the Unbound Festival	2018
Bacchus	Pacific Northwest Ballet	Mathew Neenan	McCaw Hall	Part of the Director's Choice mixed bill	2019
13th Heaven	Singapore Dance Theatre	Edward Liang		Location: Esplanade, Singapore	2019
Guitar Concerto	Madison Ballet	Ja Malik	Promenade Hall, Madison		2024
Dance Odyssey	Madison Ballet	Ja Malik	Promenade Hall, Madison		2024
Camillia	Madison Ballet	Xavier Nunez	Joffrey Academy of Dance		2024
The Puffer Fish	London Vocational Ballet School	Gavin McCaig	Excel London, 1 Victoria Dock, London		2024
New Kitka	School of American Ballet	Emily Kitka	School of American Ballet		2024
Semblance	Golden State Ballet	Norbert De La Cruz	The Historic Balboa Center, San Diego		2024
The Veil Between Worlds	PNBallet	Edwaard Liang	The Kennedy Center and McCaw Hall		2024
Arcadia	Dimensions Dance Theatre	Yanis Eric Pikieris	Pinecrest Gardens		2024
I Remember Now	Smuin Contemporary Ballet	Amy Seiwert	Yerba Buena Center for the Arts, San Francisco		2025
In Bloom	Dimensions Dance Theatre	Yanis Eric Pikieris	Pinecrest Gardens		2025
The Whispering Earth	Ballet Academy East	Tom Gold	The Kaye Playhouse at Hunter College		2025
Illuminate	Houston Ballet	Jacquelyn Long	Wortham Theater Center		2025

=== Instrumental works ===
==== Orchestra ====
Work	Details	Year
Bacchus	Orchestra	2019
Pacific Northwest Ballet	Orchestra	2019
Poseidon	Orchestra	2012

==== Soloist(s) and orchestra ====
Work	Details	Year
Lost Lake	Violin and Strings	2011
Skyward		2013
Voyager	Violin, Strings and Piano	2013
Flight – Concerto for Violin	Violin and strings	2013
Airborne Dances	Solo violin and strings	2014
Frontiers	Violin and strings	2015
Arco	Violin and Orchestra	2016
Morpheus	Cello, Piano and Orchestra	
Three Piece Suite	Premiered by Katherine Jenkinson and Alison Ferr at the Derby Chamber Society Concert	2016
Sonar	Piano, Violin and Orchestra	
Anno	Solo violin and strings	2018
Spiral	Piano, Violin and Orchestra	2018
Liberty	Piano, Viola, Violin, Orchestra	

==== Soloist(s) and large ensemble (7 or more players) ====
Work	Instrumentation	Year
Epilogue	Solo violin and strings	2014

==== Works for 2–6 players ====
Work	Instrumentation	Year
Chillingham	Soprano, Cello, Piano, Viola, Violin	2011
Elements		2011
Three days in November	Violin and Piano	2012

==== Solo keyboard(s) ====
Work	Instrumentation	Year
Childhood Sketches	Piano	2011
Scenes from the Solent	Piano	2012
The Calm, The Storm	Piano	2012

==== Chorus a cappella / chorus plus 1 instrument ====
Work	Instrumentation	Year
A Song for Malala	Male Voice Choir and Piano	2013

==== Chorus and orchestra/ensemble ====
Work	Instrumentation	Year
Air Waltz	Violin, Trebles, Strings, Harps	2013
Air	Orchestra and Voice	2022

==== Solo voice(s) and up to 6 players ====
Work	Instrumentation	Year
London Song Cycle	Soprano, 2 flutes, 2 marimba, and cello	2011

=== Sound design ===
Work	Director	Details	Year
Dead Cow Farm	Carl Cresser		1997
Sucked up	Carl Cresser	Animation film for Channel 4 made by John Parry	2003
AnnLee You Proposes	Artist: Liam Gillick	Animated CG installation for Tate Britain created by MPC (Turner Prize entry)	2003
Eye Ball	Lars Magnus Holmgren AKA Dr Frankenskippy		2004

=== Musicals ===
Work	Details	Year
TV22	Lyrics and story by Paul Gambaccini	2000
Thomas & Friends: The Great Race	David Stoten	2016
