= TCM Classic Shorts Film Competition =

The TCM Classic Shorts Film Competition was set up in 2000.

== 2006 ==
The judges for this competition involved actor Pierce Brosnan and filmmaker Terry Gilliam.

Award	Film	Director(s)	Producer(s)	Writer(s)	Production Company
First Prize	Silence Is Golden	Chris Shepherd	Maria Manton		Slinky Pictures
Second Prize	Tokyo Jim	Jamie Rafn	Doug Wade		
Third Prize	Venom	John Hayes	John McDonnell		
Runner Up	Cubs	Tom Harper	Lisa Williams		
Runner Up	Icicle Melt	Amy Neil	Andrew Bonner		

== 2005 ==
The judges for this competition included actresses Helen Mirren and Kate Winslet and actors Julian Fellowes and Alan Rickman.

Award	Film	Director(s)	Producer(s)	Writer(s)	Production Company
First Prize	Jane Lloyd	Happy	Nick Sutherland		
Second Prize	End Game	Andrew Greener	Sarah Aynesworth		
Third Prize	The Banker	Hattie Dalton	Kelly Broad		
Runner Up	The Clap	Geoff Lindsey	Alan Dewshurst		
Runner Up	Ashes	Corinna Faith			
Runner Up	Special People	Justin Edgar			

== 2004 ==
Award	Film	Director(s)	Producer(s)	Writer(s)	Production Company
First Prize	Nits	Harry Wootliff	Harry Wootliff		
Second Prize	Between Us	Stefan Mork, Charlotte Christensen	Rebekah Gilbertson		
Third Prize	Belly Button	David Hewitt			
Runner Up	Call Register	Ed Roe	Kit Hawkins, Adam Tudhope		
Runner Up	Gravity	Colin Hutton	Kate Norrish		
Runner Up	Funeral Etiquette	Martin Romanella	Anna Haas		

== 2003 ==
Award	Film	Director(s)	Producer(s)	Writer(s)	Production Company
First Prize	The Most Beautiful Man in the World	Alicia Duffy	Hugh Welchman		Breakthru Films
Second Prize	The Bypass	Amit Kumar	Trevor Ingram		
Third Prize	Brown Paper Bag	Michael Baig Clifford	Natasha Carlish		Dreamfinder Productions

== 2002 ==
Award	Film	Director(s)	Producer(s)	Writer(s)	Production Company
First Prize	Thespian X	Gerald McMorrow	Karim Halwagi		TX Film Production Ltd
Second Prize	Salaryman	Jake Knight	Shane RJ Walter		Onedotzero
Third Prize	Eddie Loves Mary	Hannah Rothschild	Nicky Kentish Barnes		
High Commendation	Love Your Neighbour	James Bloom	James Bloom	James Bloom	

== 2001 ==
Award	Film	Director(s)	Producer(s)	Writer(s)	Production Company
First Prize	About a Girl	Brian Percival	Janey De Nordwall		Silver Films Ltd
Second Prize	The Last Post	Dominic Santana	Lee Santana		Danny Boon Productions
Third Prize	Skin Deep	Yousaf Ali Khan	Andy Porter		APT Film & TV
Highly Commended	To Catch a Crow	Shay Leonard	Alexis Bicât	Shay Leonard	Parent International

== 2000 ==
Award	Film	Director(s)	Producer(s)	Writer(s)	Production Company
First Prize	Je T'Aime John Wayne	Toby MacDonald	Luke Morris		
Second Prize	Going Down	Tom Shankland	Sol Gatti-Pascual		Diablo Films
Third Prize	Sweet	James Pilkington	Rob Mercer		Angry Donkey Productions
