= Farber's Nerve =

Farber's Nerve is a short animated film by Morgan Miller. The film centers on a retiring dentist in New York City.

Dr. Farber, who had a practice on the Upper East Side of Manhattan, reflects on his career, mistakes, frustrations, and greatest challenges. It is a charming film, poignant and funny, showing Dr. Farber's unassuming nature and ability to laugh at himself. He makes some remarks about changes in Health Insurance and Dental coverage that have occurred in the United States over the course of his career. The film is in black and white, animated in a unique style.

Farber's Nerve was programmed alongside Who I Am And What I Want by David Shrigley and Chris Shepherd in the 2006 Manhattan Short Film Festival world tour, which spanned 137 screenings across the United States, Canada, the UK, and Europe.
