= Jean Boht =

English actress (1932–2023)

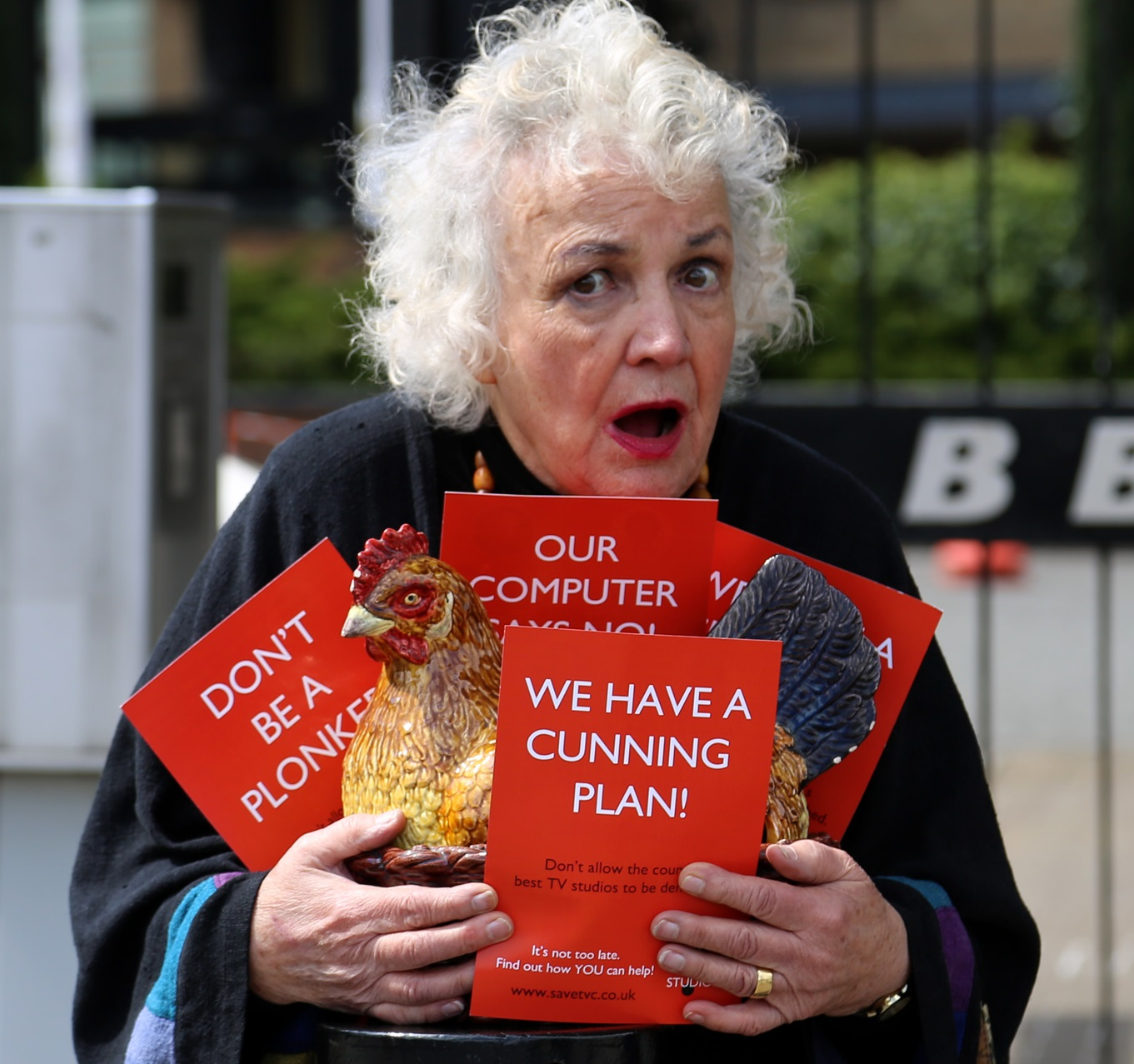
- Boht at Save TV Centre Studios in 2013
- Born: Jean Dance; 6 March 1932; Bebington, Cheshire, England
- Died: 12 September 2023 (aged 91); Northwood, London, England
- Education: Liverpool Playhouse
- Occupation: Actress
- Years active: 1962–2018
- Known for: Bread (1986–1991)
- Spouses: William Boht (m. 1954; div. 1970) Carl Davis (m. 1970; died 2023)
- Children: 2

Jean Boht (née Dance; 6 March 1932 – 12 September 2023) was an English actress, most famous for the role of Nellie Boswell in Carla Lane's sitcom Bread, one of several actors to remain with the show for its entire seven-series tenure from 1986 to 1991.

== Early life ==
Boht was born as Jean Dance on 6 March 1932 in Bebington, then in Cheshire, to Thomas Dance, a confectionery-importer and chief entertainment officer of the local fire brigade, and pianist Edna May "Teddy", née Macdonald. She was educated at Wirral Grammar School for Girls.

== Career ==
Boht trained at the Liverpool Playhouse, where she started her career as a theatre actress, before touring the United Kingdom in stage roles, working in numerous West End Theatres including the Royal National Theatre and the Bristol Old Vic. In a career spanning from 1962 to 2018, she appeared largely in television productions. These included guesting parts in television spots Softly, Softly (1971), Some Mothers Do 'Ave 'Em (1978), Grange Hill (1978), Last of the Summer Wine (1978), Boys from the Blackstuff (1982), Scully (1984) and Juliet Bravo in the mid-1980s.

It was through her regular role in the sitcom Bread (1986–91), as matriarch Nellie Boswell, that Boht found her largest audience, with the series attracting some 20 million viewers.

In 1989, Boht was the subject of This Is Your Life, and in 2008 she made a guest appearance in BBC One's daytime TV soap Doctors.

Boht starred in The Brighton Belles, an unsuccessful British adaptation of the American sitcom The Golden Girls as the character of Josephine, based on Sophia Petrillo, the part made famous by Estelle Getty.

On stage, Boht appeared with Jeremy Irons in Embers (2006) at the Duke of York's Theatre in London.

Boht also appeared in the film Mothers and Daughters (2004), and starred in Chris Shepherd's award-winning short film Bad Night for the Blues (2010).

== Personal life, illness and death ==
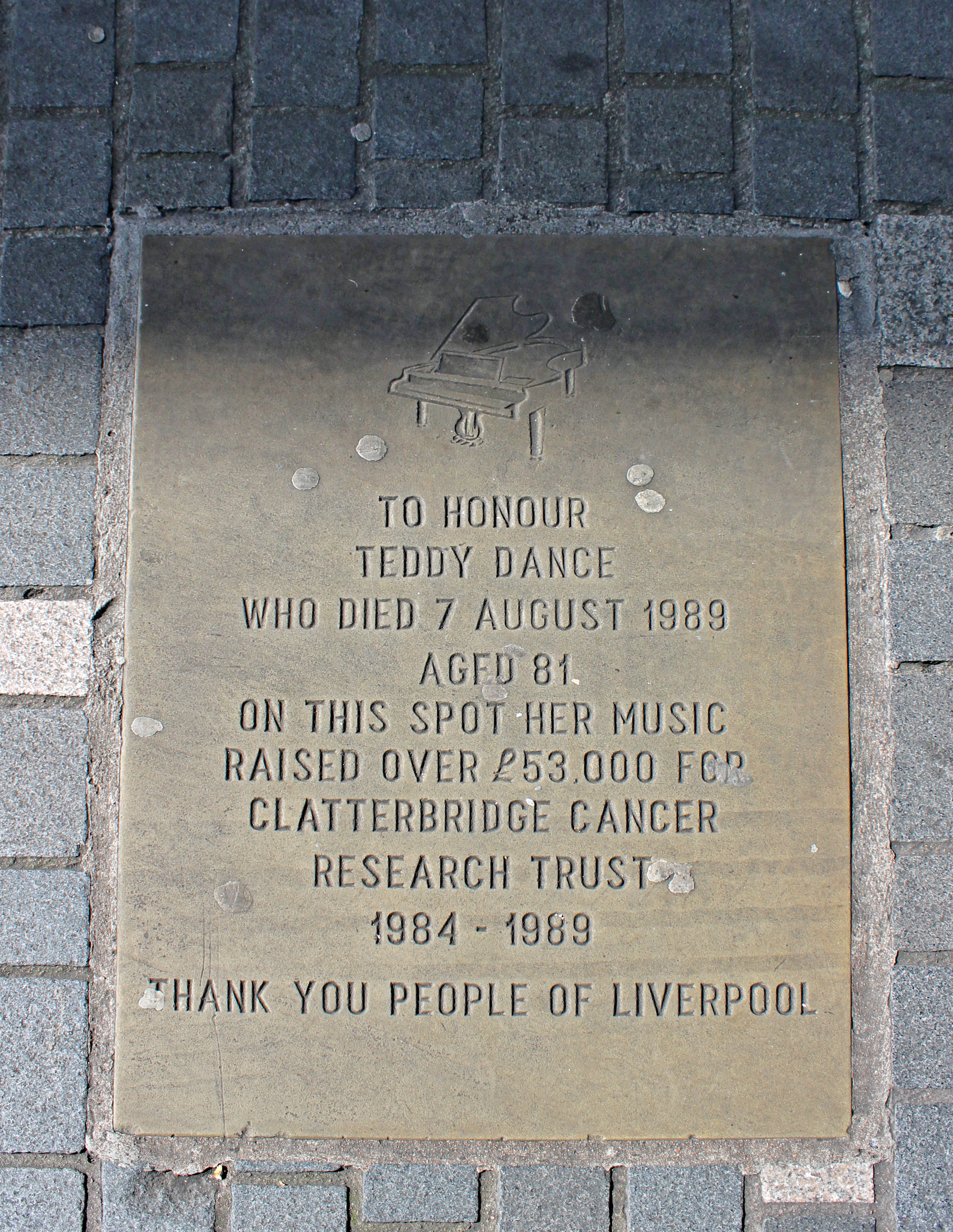
Commemorative plaque honouring Jean's mother Teddy Dance

Her first marriage to William Boht ended in divorce. She married the American-British conductor and composer Carl Davis on 28 December 1970. They had two daughters, filmmakers Hannah (born 1972) and Jessie (born 1974). Boht and Davis were executive producers on Hannah Davis's film The Understudy and they appeared in the film as a married couple. Davis died on 3 August 2023, just six weeks before Boht herself.

Boht was diagnosed with vascular dementia and Alzheimer's disease. She was a resident at Denville Hall, a retirement home in Northwood, London, for actors and other members of the entertainment industry.

Boht died from complications of dementia on 12 September 2023, aged 91.

== Awards ==
Boht won a British Comedy Award (now known as the "National Comedy Awards") for Best Comedy Actress in 1990.

== Filmography ==
=== Film ===
| Year | Film | Role | Director | Notes |
|---|---|---|---|---|
| 1978 | Rapunzel Let Down Your Hair | Mother | Susan Shapiro; Esther Ronay; Francine Winham | |
| 1988 | Distant Voices, Still Lives | Aunty Nell | Terence Davies | |
| 1988 | The Girl in a Swing | Mrs. Taswell | Gordon Hessler | |
| 1994 | Heaven's a Drag | Mrs. Downs | Peter Mackenzie Litten | |
| 2000 | The Asylum | Mrs. Brindle | John Stewart | |
| 2004 | Mothers & Daughters | Mary | David Conolly; Hannah Davis | |
| 2007 | Tug | Kathleen | David Andrew Ward | Short film |
| 2007 | Smallfilm | Ada | Richard Lawrence | Short film |
| 2008 | The Understudy | Mrs. Davidovitz | David Conolly; Hannah Davis | |
| 2009 | Kin | Mum | Brian Welsh | |
| 2009 | To Cancer and Beyond | Mrs. Taggert | Veronica Walsh | Short film |
| 2010 | Bad Night for the Blues | Glad | Chris Shepherd | Short film |
| 2018 | Brexicuted | Short film | Chris Shepherd | |

=== Television ===
| Year | Title | Role | Notes |
|---|---|---|---|
| 1968 | Mr. Rose | Woman | 3.01 "The Less-Than-Iron-Duke" |
| 1970 | Scene | Mrs. Potter | 3.04 "£60 Single, £100 Return" |
| 1971 | Softly, Softly: Task Force | Mrs. Lacey | 2.22 "Games" |
| 1973 | Six Days of Justice | Mrs. Taylor | 2.02 "A Clear-Cut Case" |
| 1973 | Ego Hugo | Madame Mars-George | Television film |
| 1973 | Z-Cars | Clerk of the Court | 9.08 "The Cinder Path" |
| 1975 | Couples | Mrs. Bannister | 6 episodes |
| 1976 | Where Adam Stood | Mary Teague | Television film |
| 1976 | Bill Brand | Edna Copple | 1.10 "Revisions" |
| 1977 | Esther Waters | Mrs. Spires | 1.02 "Episode Two" |
| 1977 | Last of the Summer Wine | Maureen | 4.05 "Who Made a Bit of a Splash in Wales Then?" |
| 1978 | Grange Hill | First Shop Assistant | 1.05 "Episode Five" |
| 1978 | The Sweeney | Woman Neighbour | 4.11 "Hearts and Mind" |
| 1978 | Some Mothers Do 'Ave 'Em | Mrs. Lewis | 3.01 "Moving House"; 3.03 "Scottish Dancing" |
| 1979 | Mother Nature's Bloomers | Various characters | 6 episodes |
| 1981 | Sons and Lovers | Mrs. Leivers | Television miniseries |
| 1981 | Funny Man | Elsie | 13 episodes |
| 1981 | Juliet Bravo | Mrs. Stannard | 2.04 "Lies and Liars" |
| 1982 | Triangle | Mrs. Carter | 7 episodes |
| 1982 | Juliet Bravo | Mrs. Fairchild | 3.07 "Nothing to Report" |
| 1982 | Boys from the Blackstuff | D.O.E. - Miss Sutcliffe | 1.03 "Shop Thy Neighbour" |
| 1983 | Goodnight and God Bless | Doris | 1.05 "Ronnie's Wonderful Day" |
| 1983 | Maybury | Lucy Wildego | 2.06 "Love's Labour: Part 1" |
| 1983 | Spyship | Mrs. Silvers | Television miniseries |
| 1983 | Juliet Bravo | Mrs. Jackson | 4.12 "Off Duty" |
| 1983 | Bergerac | Mrs. Farrell | 3.03 "Holiday Snaps" |
| 1984 | Scully | Gran | Television miniseries |
| 1984 | Arthur's Hallowed Ground | Betty | Television film |
| 1985–1986 | I Woke Up One Morning | Mrs. Hamilton | 8 episodes |
| 1986–1991 | Bread | Nellie Boswell | 74 episodes |
| 1987 | Agatha Christie's Miss Marple | Madame Joliet | 1.09 "4:50 from Paddington" |
| 1988 | Screenplay | Mrs. Bing | 3.04 "Eskimos Do It" |
| 1992 | The Cloning of Joanna May | Mrs. Love | Television miniseries |
| 1992 | Cluedo | Sister Concepta | 3.05 "And Then There Were Nuns" |
| 1993 | Comedy Playhouse | Josephine | 1.03 "Brighton Belles: Pilot" |
| 1993–1994 | Brighton Belles | Josephine | 11 episodes |
| 1995 | The Big Game | Mrs. Harper | Television film |
| 1996 | Jim's Gift | Mrs. Leaver | Television film |
| 1998 | Casualty | Lil Clarke | 13.15 "No Place Like Home" |
| 2000 | Doctors | Sylvia Wharton | 1.27 "Loose Ends"; 1.32 "Twist of Fate"; 1.41 "To Have and to Hold" |
| 2002 | Holby City | Anita Reynolds | 4.31 "Hearts and Minds" |
| 2003 | The Bill | Winnie Kettering | 19.48 "123: High Speed Chaos" |
| 2003 | Trial & Retribution | Female Neighbour | 7.02 "Suspicion: Part 2" |
| 2005 | Celebrate 'Oliver!' | Widow Corney | Television film |
| 2006 | Doctors | Jean Clarkson | 8.105 "Before the Fall" |
| 2007 | Holby City | Rosemary Mulligan | 9.34 "Another Country" |
| 2007 | The Bill | Rose Harrison | 23.59 "Deadly Secrets" |
| 2008 | Doctors | Norah Joyce | 10.107 "Ben and Norah" |
| 2009 | Casualty | Dorothy Gilbert | 23.45 "Ashes" |
| 2010 | Missing | Barbara Mansfield | 2.08 "Proving the Point" |
| 2010 | Doctors | Billie Cannon | 12.84 "A Call of Nature" |
| 2011 | Skins | Doreen | 5.08 "Everyone" |
| 2011 | Justice | Mrs. Roden | 1.02 "Like Father Like Son" |
| 2012 | Casualty | Doris Quinn | 26.21 "The Only One You Love" |
| 2012 | Doctors | Doreen Bennett | 14.70 "Good Citizens" |

=== Video games ===
| Year | Title | Role | Notes |
|---|---|---|---|
| 1996 | The Animals of Farthing Wood | Voice | |
