= Broken jaw (disambiguation) =

Broken jaw may refer to:

- Mandibular fracture, a medical condition where the jawbone breaks from trauma
- Broken Jaw (song), a song by Foster the People
- The Broken Jaw, a film by Chris Shepherd
