= Mansion Pictures =

Mansion Pictures was established by British husband and wife team Hannah Davis and David Conolly. They also produced drama for the BBC and made the critically acclaimed shorts, A Life In a Day (nominated for Best Short Film, British Short Film Festival) and The Other Side of the Mirror.

Their first feature film, which they co-wrote, produced and directed was Mothers & Daughters. For which they were nominated - The Golden Hitchcock Award for Direction.

Mothers & Daughters was invited to film festivals worldwide in 2004, debuting at Cannes Film Festival then playing at: São Paulo; Montreal, Quebec; Barcelona; Chicago; New York Indie; AFM; The Hamptons; Raindance, and finally the Festival Film Brittanique du Dinard where it was chosen as one of the top six British films of 2004. This garnered them a development deal with the UK Film Council and later financing for their second feature film, The Understudy, which has been traveling the film festival circuit. Festival laurels for The Understudy include: Official Selection Avignon Film Festival; Official Selection Film Columbia; Official Selection São Paulo International Film Festival; Official Selection The Bahamas International Film Festival; Official Selection Beverly Hills Hi-Def Film Festival, The Silver Lei award for excellence in filmmaking from Honolulu International Film Festival the award for Best Original Score from the Composers Union of France.

Alongside traveling the world with The Understudy, David and Hannah have a number of screenplays in development, are overseeing the release of Mothers & Daughters in March 2009 and currently reside in Los Angeles.

== Filmography ==
- Mothers & Daughters (2004)
- The Understudy (2008)
