= Lloyd McGuire =

British actor (born 1947)

- Born: Stephen W. McGuire; 2 September 1947 (age 78); Birmingham, Warwickshire, England
- Occupation: Actor

Lloyd McGuire (born 2 September 1947) is an English actor in film and television.

== Education ==
Born in Birmingham, Warwickshire, McGuire attended Bournville Grammar-Technical School for Boys. He began work as a Commercial Apprentice at the Austin Motor Company in Birmingham in 1964 and toyed with developing a career as a footballer (even playing in King Norton's League and for Alvechurch second team). He became disillusioned with both football and life at "the Austin" and, after watching a Michael Caine film, declared he was going to be an actor. He was encouraged by his apprentice supervisor and gained entry to drama school.

While training to be a British Leyland salesman, McGuire made the move to become an actor. Introduced to the Alvechurch Amateur Dramatic Society, he did some work at Crescent Theatre (initially using the name Steve McGuire) before being trained at the Birmingham College of Speech and Drama.

== Career ==
His most popular role was that of Bob in the Channel 4 TV series Teachers but he has also appeared in many TV programmes over the last few decades such as Coronation Street, Juliet Bravo, Midsomer Murders and so on. He has often played policemen, including the role of Sgt. Calder on the second series of Prime Suspect, recurring appearances as DS Bernie Duckworth in Juliet Bravo, and multiple characters in The Bill. Other TV show appearances include Bergerac, Boon, Birds of a Feather, Casualty, Doctor Who (Part One of The Face of Evil), Doctors, Heartbeat, Holby City, Inspector Morse, Jonathan Creek, Lovejoy and Agatha Christie's Poirot.

In 2010, he played the Master of Ceremonies in Chris Shepherd's award-winning film Bad Night for the Blues.

In 2013, he appeared as Valco boss Martin Shell in the third series of Sky One's Trollied.

On stage, McGuire appeared and performed in Scotland and at the Everyman Theatre, Cheltenham. At the latter, he was seen by a talent scout who recruited him for the Royal Shakespeare Company, leading to appearances at Aldwych Theatre and Stratford-upon-Avon, as well as Richard II in New York.
