= Dad's Dead =

- Directed by: Chris Shepherd
- Written by: Chris Shepherd
- Produced by: Maria Manton
- Starring: Ian Hart; Chris Freeney; Dave Kent
- Edited by: Seb Duthy
- Music by: John Moore
- Distributed by: Slinky Pictures onedotzero
- Release date: 29 December 2003
- Country: United Kingdom
- Language: English

Dad's Dead is a seven-minute award winning film written and directed by Chris Shepherd, commissioned by animate! and funded by Arts Council England and Channel 4.. It was first transmitted on Channel 4 in 2003. Mixing animation with live action, the film deals with how memory works. The film was shot on DV and Betacam SP and edited in Adobe After Effects and Aura.

On 27 August 2007, Dad's Dead was released as an extra on the DVD release of Danny Boyle's science fiction film Sunshine. A new remastered HD version of the film was released for the first time in January 2011. The film received a sequel in 2016, Johnno's Dead.

== Synopsis ==
Ian Hart plays the narrator, an urban storyteller who relives his youth in 1970s and 80s Liverpool.

The narrator opens by asking the viewer if they ever think about the people they went to school with. He goes on to talk about his "best mate", Johnno, a popular and rebellious boy at school. However, Johnno turns out to be a thoroughly obnoxious and violent person, frequently swindling, stealing, vandalizing property and generally committing antisocial acts. He apparently enjoys cruelty to animals, throwing hamsters and cats off high-rise flats and bricking ducks. Johnno once confused the narrator by falsely telling him his father had died (hence the film's title).

The film then shows Johnno (whose face distorts into an ugly caricature every time he commits an unpleasant act) first beating up the narrator, then inviting him to the house of a "mate" — a blind man who thinks Johnno is his best friend, while Johnno in fact vandalizes his house, leaves maggot-infested food in his kitchen and even spits on him, all without the man being aware of it. The climax of the film has Johnno leaving the narrator unconscious as he burns the blind man's apartment — a crime for which the narrator is wrongly imprisoned. At the end, the narrator's elderly mother is shown answering the door to her Meals on Wheels carer - who turns out to be Johnno, laughing nastily as he enters the old woman's home.

== Cast ==
- Ian Hart as Narrator
- Chris Freeney as Johnno
- Dallas Messias as Johnno's Mum
- John Murphy as Johnno's Dad
- Charlotte McDougall as Lady in Children's Book
- Joe Robson Rutherford as Boy in Children's Book
- Goldie as Dog in Children's Book
- Dave Kent as Old Man
- Kay D'Arcyas Narrator's Mother
- Thomas Sturges-Allard as Hand Artist
- Julie Maisey as Newsreader
- Spud Murphy (uncredited)

== Awards ==
=== 2003 ===
- Winner of Best Short Film, British Independent Film Awards
- Winner of The Quantel Animation Award at Rushes Soho Shorts Festival
- Winner of The Metropolis Prize at L'Isola Del Cinema Festival in Rome, Italy
- Winner of The Grand Prize at Cabbagetown Film & Video Festival, Toronto
- Winner of The Encouragement Award at Fantoche International Animation Fest, Switzerland
- Winner of Special Video Award at Split International Festival of New Film, Croatia
- Winner of Best Independent Animation Award at FAN International Animation Festival, Norwich
- Winner of Best Animation Award at Kino International Film Festival, Manchester
- Winner of Best Professional Film Award at BAF! International Animation Festival, Bradford
- Winner of Special Prize at DaKino Film Festival, Romania
- Winner of Third Prize at Animadrid, IV International Animation Festival, Spain

=== 2004 ===
- Nominated for Best Animation Short, BAFTA Film Awards
- Winner of Best Short Film at the British Animation Awards
- Winner of Best Film at Cutting Edge, British Animation Awards
- Winner of Honourable Mention (Editing) at Carolina Film and Video Festival, USA
- Winner of Best Film, Pitcher and Piano Awards, London
- Winner of Honourable Mention at Ann Arbor Film Festival, USA
- Winner of Honourable Mention at Bermuda International Film Festival, USA
- Winner of Silver Remi Award at Worldfest Houston International Film Festival, USA
- Honourable Mention for Visual Style at Los Angeles International Film Festival, USA
- Diploma for Best Experimental Film, Balkaname 2004, Bulgaria

== DVD releases ==
- Shorts! Volume 1 December 2003. USA. Region 1. ASIN:B00013UGE6. As part of compilation with The Making Of Dad's Dead and director's commentary.
- onedotzero_selectdvd2 January 2004. UK. All regions. ASIN:B000189K80. As part of a compilation with The Making Of Dad's Dead.
- Animatic Volume 1 2004. France. Reperages Magazine. All regions. As part of a compilation.
- Sunshine August 2007. UK. Region 2. ASIN:B000S6UZEM. As extra.
- Sunshine October 2007. UK. Region 2. Blu-ray. ASIN:B000VIRD6U. As extra.
- Sunshine January 2008. USA. Region 1. ASIN:B000Y7U98C. As extra.
- Sunshine January 2008. USA. Region 1. Blu-ray. ASIN:B000Y7U98W. As extra.
- Motion Blur 2 January 2008. UK. All regions. ISBN 1-85669-509-3. Interview and feature on director with film on DVD.
- Chris Shepherd: Beyond Animation 2014. France. All regions. As part of compilation.
