= The Brighton Belles =

British TV comedy series

- Genre: Sitcom
- Based on: The Golden Girls by Susan Harris
- Screenplay by: Christopher Skala
- Directed by: James Cellan Jones
- Starring: Sheila Hancock; Wendy Craig; Sheila Gish; Jean Boht
- Country of origin: United Kingdom
- Original language: English
- No. of series: 1
- No. of episodes: 11 (10 series episodes + 1 pilot)

Production
- Executive producer: Al Mitchell
- Producer: Humphrey Barclay
- Running time: 24–25 minutes
- Production companies: Humphrey Barclay Productions; Carlton Television

Original release
- Network: ITV
- Release: 9 March 1993 – 28 December 1994

The Brighton Belles is a British sitcom and a remake of the American series The Golden Girls. Produced by Humphrey Barclay Productions for Carlton Television, it follows four older women sharing a house in Brighton and stars Sheila Hancock, Wendy Craig, Sheila Gish and Jean Boht.

The series originated as a pilot shown on 9 March 1993 as part of Carlton Television's Comedy Playhouse strand. Although the pilot attracted an audience of around 12 million viewers, The Brighton Belles was poorly received and was dropped from ITV's schedule after six episodes. The remaining episodes were broadcast more than a year later, in late-night timeslots in December 1994.

Both contemporary reviews and later commentary have frequently cited The Brighton Belles as an example of the difficulties involved in adapting successful American sitcoms for British television, with critics arguing that it adhered too closely to the original scripts.

== Characters ==
The four principal characters closely mirror their counterparts in The Golden Girls.

- Frances – a sardonic, divorced former school headmistress, equivalent to Dorothy in the American series. She is played by Sheila Hancock.
- Josephine – Frances's outspoken 80-year-old mother, corresponding to Sophia. She is played by Jean Boht.
- Bridget – a flirtatious museum curator who owns the Brighton house in which the women live, corresponding to Blanche. She is played by Sheila Gish.
- Annie – a widowed farmer's daughter from Wiltshire who works as a bereavement counsellor, corresponding to Rose. She is played by Wendy Craig.

== Production ==
In early 1993, the newly formed Carlton Television launched Comedy Playhouse, a run of one-off sitcom pilots intended as potential series starters. The Brighton Belles originated as one of these pilots and was broadcast on ITV on 9 March 1993, with the concept framed as a British remake of the American sitcom The Golden Girls.

The pilot was written by Christopher Skala and directed by James Cellan Jones. Skala's adaptation was based on scripts by the original series' creator Susan Harris. In a review of the pilot, Mark Lawson wrote that the remake retained much of the structure of The Golden Girls while relocating its setting from Miami to Brighton.

The pilot and series were produced by Humphrey Barclay Productions for ITV. Humphrey Barclay served as producer and Al Mitchell as executive producer, with Cellan Jones directing the episodes.

== Broadcast ==
The Brighton Belles began with a pilot broadcast on ITV on 9 March 1993. The series continued with further episodes broadcast on ITV between September and October 1993.

The pilot attracted an audience of around 12 million viewers on its initial broadcast. Despite the strong launch, the programme was poorly received and was removed from the ITV schedule after six episodes had aired.

The remaining episodes were eventually broadcast more than a year later, between 7 and 28 December 1994. These later transmissions were scheduled in late-night filler slots.

== Episodes ==
No.	Title		Original release date
0	"Pilot"	24:46	9 March 1993
An elderly mother moves in with her daughter and two other women in Brighton, upsetting the household's fragile balance.
1	"The Triangle"	24:38	7 September 1993
Frances is attracted to her mother's handsome new GP and they agree a date.
2	"Job Hunting"	24:14	14 September 1993
When Annie loses her job at the centre, Bridget, Frances and Josephine worry about her finding another; Annie is more concerned about the people she counselled.
3	"The Tournament"	24:47	21 September 1993
4	"Guess Who's Coming to the Wedding?"	24:42	28 September 1993
5	"Love in a Sea Mist"	24:40	5 October 1993
Annie is invited on a cruise by Humphrey from Hull, but is worried about sharing a cabin.
6	"The Transplant"	24:13	12 October 1993
When Bridget's hated sister comes to stay, she asks an impossible favour.
7	"That Was No Lady"	24:59	7 December 1994
Frances has an affair with a geography teacher until he admits he is married. Meanwhile, Bridget tries to persuade Annie to buy her car.
8	"The Break In"	24:05	14 December 1994
The women arrive home to find that the house has been ransacked by burglars, and they call in a security consultant whose scare tactics terrify Annie.
9	"The Younger Man"	24:36	21 December 1994
Bridget begins dating a gym instructor half her age, but their dinner ends badly when he admits he is attracted to her as a mother substitute. Meanwhile, Annie's mother comes to stay and Josephine takes her out for a lively night on the town.
10	"Gilbert's Return"	24:14	28 December 1994
Frances' ex-husband Gilbert arrives in Brighton for her to sign legal documents. Over lunch, he reveals that his second wife has left him; Frances sympathises and agrees to go for a meal together. The next morning, the others are shocked to find that Gilbert spent the night at the house, but Frances insists it was a one-off.

== Reception ==
The Brighton Belles received largely negative reviews, many of which focused on the programme's closeness to The Golden Girls. Reviewing the pilot for The Guardian, Nancy Banks-Smith called it "a pointless exercise to copy an original". Writing in The Independent, Mark Lawson similarly argued that "good jokes ... come from the heart of a culture", and concluded that between British and American humour there was "a special divorce".

Later reviews were more openly dismissive. In a subsequent column for The Guardian, Banks-Smith wrote that "the American script and the British cast came apart" and described the adaptation as "a complete transplant rejection". Reviewing the programme's later broadcasts in 1994, Jaci Stephen of the Daily Mirror wrote that the series returned from its hiatus "in as depressing a state as it went".

Retrospective commentary has been similarly critical. Writing in The Guardian in 2018, David Stubbs described the sitcom as a "flagrant replication of an already well-loved show" for which there was "not any earthly reason to watch". In a later public talk reported by The Mancunion, cast member Sheila Hancock said that the comedy "did not work in British English" because it "was designed to be American".
