= Anfield Road (graphic novel) =

Graphic novel

Publication information
- Publisher: Titan Comics
- Publication date: 2024
- No. of issues: 1

Creative team
- Written by: Chris Shepherd
- Artist: Chris Shepherd

Collected editions
- Hardback: ISBN 9781787743731

Anfield Road is a 272-page graphic novel written and illustrated by Chris Shepherd and published by Titan Comics. It was released on the 29th October 2024. set in the working-class environment of Liverpool, Merseyside, in the late 1980s. It is Shepherd's debut graphic novel and took four years to draw. He began making it without a publishing deal in place.

== Plot ==
The story revolves around Conor Sterling, an 18-year-old who faces the dilemma of either attending art college or staying to care for his domineering, sick grandmother. As life accelerates, Conor falls in love with a West-Indian girl, which his grandmother disapproves of, leading to a conflict between personal ambition and familial duty. The narrative explores themes of family, love, ambition, and coming of age, set against the backdrop of 1989 Liverpool, including references to cultural and tragic events like the Hillsborough disaster.

== Reception ==
Critics such as Rachel Cooke, Robin Ince and Olivia Hingley have lauded "Anfield Road" for its heartfelt narrative and depiction of Liverpool. The book was The Observer's graphic novel of the month in November 2024. Rachel Cooke noting its emotional depth and the love for the city that shines through in every page. Cooke describes it as both "zany and joyful" despite the underlying sadness of some of its themes. It was nominated for Best Graphic Novel at the 2024 Broken Frontier Awards.
