= British Independent Film Awards 2003 =

British awards ceremony

6th British Independent Film Awards
- Awarded for: Best in British independent film
- Date: 4 November 2003
- Site: Hammersmith Palais, London
- Hosted by: Andi Oliver
- Official website: www.bifa.film

Highlights
- Best Film: Dirty Pretty Things
- Most awards: Dirty Pretty Things (4)
- Most nominations: Dirty Pretty Things (7)

The 6th British Independent Film Awards, held on 4 November 2003 at the Hammersmith Palais, London, honoured the best British independent films of 2003. The award ceremony was hosted by Andrea Oliver.

As per previous years, only films intended for theatrical release, and those which had a public screening to a paying audience either on general release in the UK or at a British film festival between 1 October 2002 and 30 September 2003 were eligible for consideration. In addition, they needed either to have been produced / majority co-produced by a British company, or in receipt of at least 51% of their budget from a British source or qualified as a British Film under DCMS guidelines. Lastly, they could not be solely funded by a single studio.

Shortlists were announced on 23 September 2003 at Soho House in London, with the number of nominations for each category increased from four to five. Stephen Frears' social thriller, Dirty Pretty Things led with seven nominations. Winners in thirteen categories were selected from the shortlists and a further five were awarded entirely at the jury's discretion, whose make up included Daniel Battsek, Lindy Hemming, Tom Hollander, Lindy King (Agent), Kevin MacDonald, Roman Osin, Tracey Scoffield (Head of Development and Executive Producer, BBC Film), Meera Syal, Colin Vaines and Parminder Nagra.

The awards for Best International Independent Film which had previously been split by English and Foreign language were merged this year. The discretionary Outstanding Contribution by an Actor and Lifetime Achievement awards were also merged and rebranded as The Richard Harris Award. Awards for Best Supporting Actor/Actress, Best British Documentary and Best British Short Film were introduced in this year.

== Winners and nominees ==
Best British Independent Film	Best Director
Dirty Pretty Things – Stephen Frears; 28 Days Later – Danny Boyle; Buffalo Soldiers – Gregor Jordan; The Magdalene Sisters – Peter Mullan; Young Adam – David Mackenzie	Stephen Frears – Dirty Pretty Things; Danny Boyle – 28 Days Later; David Mackenzie – Young Adam; Jim Sheridan – In America; Michael Winterbottom – In This World
Best Actor	Best Actress
Chiwetel Ejiofor – Dirty Pretty Things as Okwe/Olatokumbo Fadipe; Paddy Considine – In America as Johnny Sullivan; Ewan McGregor – Young Adam as Joe Taylor; Kevin McKidd – 16 Years of Alcohol as Frankie; Joaquin Phoenix – Buffalo Soldiers as Specialist (SPC) Ray Elwood	Olivia Williams – The Heart of Me as Madeleine; Kate Ashfield – This Little Life as Sadie MacGregor; Helena Bonham Carter – The Heart of Me as Dinah; Samantha Morton – In America as Sarah Sullivan; Tilda Swinton – Young Adam as Ella Gault
Best Supporting Actor/Actress	Most Promising Newcomer
Susan Lynch – 16 Years of Alcohol as Mary; Shirley Henderson – Wilbur Wants to Kill Himself as Alice; Sophie Okonedo – Dirty Pretty Things as Juliette; Adrian Rawlins – Wilbur Wants to Kill Himself as Harbour; Benedict Wong – Dirty Pretty Things as Guo Yi	Harry Eden – Pure as Paul; Chiwetel Ejiofor – Dirty Pretty Things as Okwe/Olatokumbo Fadipe; Romola Garai – I Capture The Castle as Cassandra Mortmain; Jamie Sives – Wilbur Wants to Kill Himself as Wilbur; Fenella Woolgar – Bright Young Things as Agatha Runcible
Best Screenplay	Best International Independent Film
Steven Knight – Dirty Pretty Things; Eric Weiss, Nora Maccoby and Gregor Jordan – Buffalo Soldiers; Tim Firth and Juliette Towhidi – Calendar Girls; Peter Mullan – The Magdalene Sisters; Anders Thomas Jensen and Lone Sherfig – Wilbur Wants to Kill Himself	Cidade de Deus (City of God), Brazil – Fernando Meirelles; Belleville Rendez-vous – Sylvain Chomet; Secretary – Steven Shainberg; Spirited Away – Hayao Miyazaki; Whale Rider – Niki Caro
Best Technical Achievement	Best Achievement in Production
In This World – Peter Christelis (Editing); Tim Alban, Joakim Sundstrom and Stuart Wilson – In This World(Sound); David Holmes – Buffalo Soldiers (Music); Michael Howells – Bright Young Things (Production Design); John Rhodes – 16 Years of Alcohol (DOP / Cinematography)	In This World – Andrew Eaton and Anita Overland; 16 Years of Alcohol – Hamish McAlpine; 28 Days Later – Andrew Macdonald and Jon Burton; Bright Young Things – Gina Carter and Miranda Davis; Buffalo Soldiers – Rainer Grupe and Ariane Moody
Douglas Hickox Award (Best Debut Director)	Best British Short Film
Richard Jobson – 16 Years of Alcohol; Stephen Fry – Bright Young Things; Sarah Gavron – This Little Life; Jeremy Wooding – Bollywood Queen; Penny Woolcock – The Principles of Lust	Dad's Dead – Chris Shepherd; 72 Faced Liar – Mark Waites; Extn 21 – Lizzie Oxby; Perfect –; Salaryman 6 – Jake Knight
Best British Documentary	Jury 2003 Award – Best Ensemble Cast
Bodysong – Simon Pummell; 100 Doors – Kerri Davenport-Burton; Bugs! – Mike Slee; The Game of their Lives – Daniel Gordon; Hoover Street Revival – Sophie Fiennes	The Magdalene Sisters
The Variety Award	The Richard Harris Award
Ian McKellen	John Hurt
Special Jury Prize	British Airways Bursary for the NFTS
Jeremy Thomas	Lenka Clayton

=== Films with multiple nominations ===
Nominations	Film
7	Dirty Pretty Things
5	Buffalo Soldiers
5	16 Years of Alcohol
4	Bright Young Things
4	In This World
4	Wilbur Wants to Kill Himself
4	Young Adam
3	28 Days Later
3	In America
3	The Magdalene Sisters
2	The Heart of Me
2	This Little Life
