= David Conolly =

British creative

David Conolly is a British filmmaker, producer, actor, writer, comedian, and educator known for his diverse contributions to the entertainment industry. Whose production company, Mansion Pictures produced two feature-length films, Mothers & Daughters and The Understudy. David Conolly has also co-created the successful television series Cooper's Bar 'with Nick Morton and Hannah Davis.

== Early life ==
David Conolly was born in Leeds. His father, Michael, worked as a chaplain in a psychiatric hospital. After initially working in psychiatry, David was selected to join the National Youth Theatre of Great Britain, leading to his West End debut at age 16. He went on to study performing arts at Leicester Polytechnic (now De Montfort University), where he directed the Mobil Winning New Play, Woundings, and won contributions to the National Student Drama Festival with Ode to St Cecilia. He completed his training at Mountview Theatre School in London and was awarded Most Outstanding Contribution to the Edinburgh Festival. Later, he returned to the West End with A Passionate Woman and the award-winning A Last Bus From Bradford.

== Personal life ==
David Conolly has been married to Hannah Davis since September 11, 1998. They frequently collaborate on film and television projects. David met Hannah while running Lunacy, an alternative comedy night on the London fringe. They then produced the pilot of Lunacy, which led to work in BBC Drama and Documentary. They created festival-nominated shorts and community films for the Red Cross, the Teenage Cancer Trust, and the National Schizophrenic Foundation. They also wrote screenplays for Hartswood Films, Quentin Morrissey, and Buffalo Pictures, as well as working on Shakespearean productions at the Open Air Theatre, Regent’s Park, London.

== Career ==
=== Film and television ===
==== Cooper's Bar ====
Cooper's Bar, co-created by David Conolly with Nick Morton and Hannah Davis, was picked up by AMC after debuting in the Episodic TV section of SXSW. The show stars Rhea Rhea Seehorn, Louis Mustillo, Phil LaMarr, Patrick Fabian, Anna Akana, and Whitney Cummings. It has run for two seasons on AMC+ and IFC, and was nominated for an Emmy and the Hollywood Critics Awards

==== Mothers & Daughters ====
He co-wrote and co-directed the feature film Mothers & Daughters (also known as Lovers & Other Problems in the US) with his wife, Hannah Davis. During the production, Hannah and David had to take breaks to earn money needed to finance the next phase of filming. The film premiered at the Cannes Film Festival, then played in São Paulo, Montreal, Quebec, Barcelona, Chicago, New York, Los Angeles, The Hamptons, London, and Dinard. Variety wrote, "Great performances, good pacing, sharp script," and the film was nominated for the Golden Hitchcock Award for Direction. Mothers and Daughters was also selected as one of the top six British films of the year.

It's worth noting that there's a 2016 film also titled Mothers and Daughters directed by Paul Duddridge and Nigel Levy, which is different from the 2004 film by David Conolly and Hannah Davis. Care should be taken not to confuse these two separate productions.

==== The Understudy ====
Another notable work of David Conolly is The Understudy, which earned a Silver Lei for Excellence in Filmmaking at the Honolulu International Film Festival and a Cinemonde award for Excellence in Direction. It also received the Roger Smith Award from Cinemonde in 2009 and the award for Best Score 2008 from the UCMF (French Composers Union).

==== Other work ====
David Conolly is a member of BAFTA and has worked on various adaptations, including Frog & Toad for Jim Henson Pictures and A Lifetime in Motion for Seismic Pictures. His television show Bedlam is in development with Element 8. Additionally, Conolly co-wrote the feature film "Father Christmas Is Back," which was released on Netflix in November 2021 and became a top ten movie in 60 countries, reaching number 4 in the US. Conolly has written narration for numerous concerts featuring actor and orchestra, performed at prestigious venues such as The Royal Albert Hall in London, Carnegie Hall in New York, and the Sydney Opera House. He and his wife, Hannah Davis, have also written scripts for Davis's father, composer Carl Davis, with whom they often collaborate. These have been performed in the Royal Albert Hall, London, and in Carnegie Hall, New York.

=== Comedy ===
As a comedian, David Conolly has performed extensively across the United States. He is a regular at The Comedy Store and hosts the Theater of Arts Comedy show at the Arena Theater in Hollywood. He has headlined in 23 states and was selected as one of the top ten headline comedians in L.A. Conolly has been a finalist in several comedy competitions and appeared on "Stand Up and Deliver" for Jennifer Lopez's Nuvo TV. Conolly is often seen in the Friday night show in The Main Room at The Comedy Store on Sunset Strip, Los Angeles, and has appeared at Stand Up NY in New York City, Zanies in Chicago, Flappers in Burbank, The Casablanca Resort and Casino in Mesquite, The Ice House in Pasadena, and The Improv in Irvine. He has also competed in the World Series of Comedy in Las Vegas. Additionally, Conolly was the MC at the World Marbles Competition and is the host of Hindsight News, an online spoof news show.

=== Podcast ===
David Conolly co-hosts the podcast Surviving the Dream with Kacey Arnold. The podcast features interviews with guests who appear to have their "dream job" and explores the realities behind their success.

== Teaching and Mentorship ==
Conolly is actively involved in education and mentorship

- Director of Education at the Theatre of Arts, overseeing the two-year acting conservatory and instructing in Improv and Stand-up.
- Artist mentor for The Theatre of Hearts, working with at-risk youth.
- Former Education Officer for the Regents Park Open Air Theatre in London, where he pioneered acting workshops for inner-city youths
