= British Independent Film Award – The Richard Harris Award =

The Richard Harris Award for Outstanding Contribution by an Actor is a British Independent Film Award that is given to the actor or actress whom the academy feels has contributed highly to British films throughout their career. The award was introduced at the 2003 ceremony.

== Winners ==
- 2002: Richard Harris
- 2003: John Hurt
- 2004: Bob Hoskins
- 2005: Tilda Swinton
- 2006: Jim Broadbent
- 2007: Ray Winstone
- 2008: David Thewlis
- 2009: Daniel Day-Lewis
- 2010: Helena Bonham Carter
- 2011: Ralph Fiennes
- 2012: Michael Gambon
- 2013: Julie Walters
- 2014: Emma Thompson
- 2015: Chiwetel Ejiofor
- 2016: Alison Steadman
- 2017: Vanessa Redgrave
- 2018: Judi Dench
- 2019: Kristin Scott Thomas
- 2020: Glenda Jackson
- 2021: Riz Ahmed
- 2022: Samantha Morton
- 2023: Stephen Graham
- 2024: Sophie Okonedo
- 2025: Emily Watson
