= David Shrigley =

British visual artist (born 1968)

David Shrigley OBE
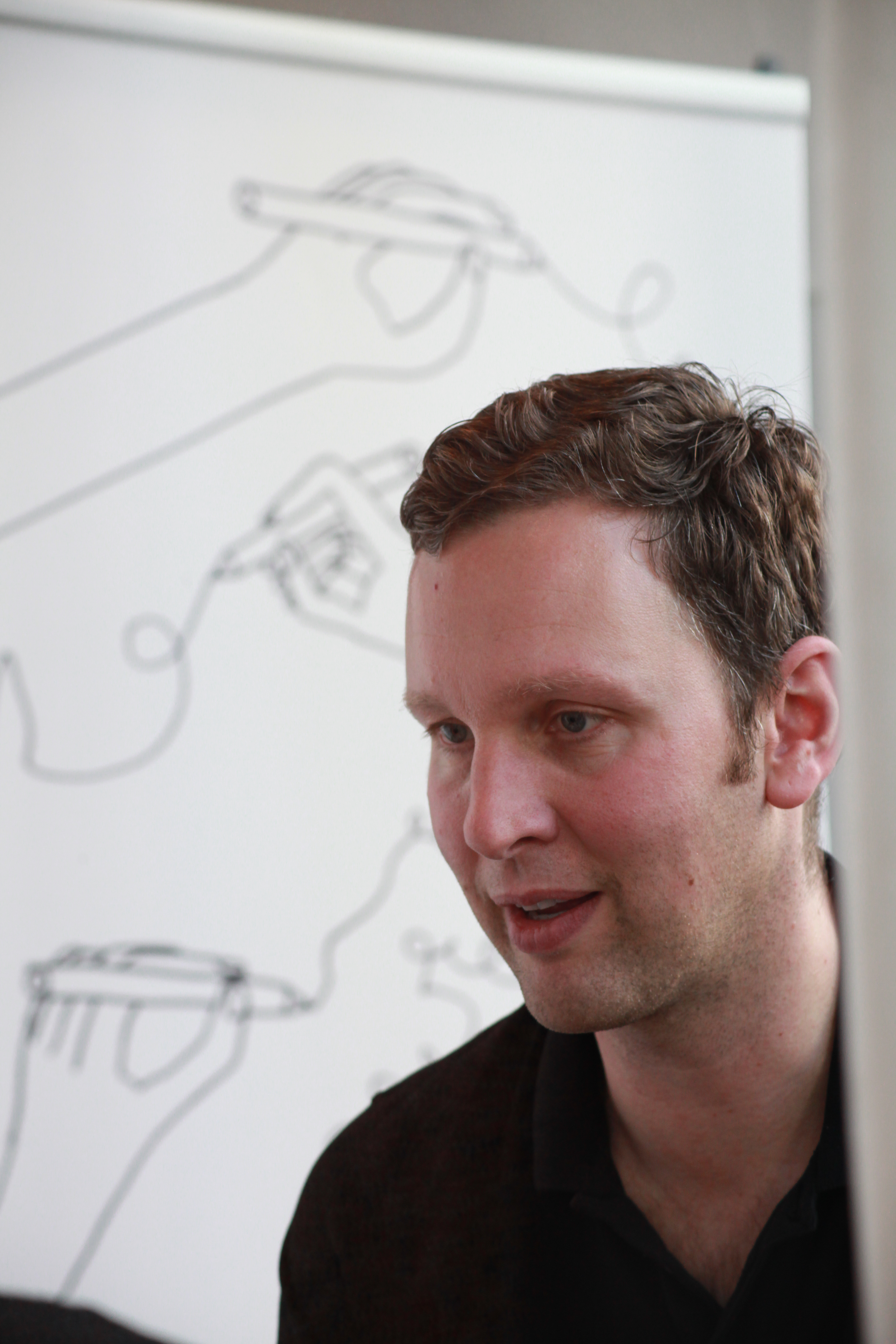
- Shrigley in 2011
- Born: David John Shrigley; 17 September 1968 (age 58); Macclesfield, Cheshire, England
- Education: Leicester Polytechnic; Glasgow School of Art
- Known for: Drawing, photography, painting, sculpture, animation, music
- Awards: Turner Prize nominee
- Website: www.davidshrigley.com

David John Shrigley OBE (born 17 September 1968) is a British visual artist. He lived and worked in Glasgow, Scotland for 27 years before moving to Brighton, England in 2015. Shrigley first came to prominence in the 1990s for his distinct line drawings, which often deal with witty, surreal and darkly humorous subject matter and are rendered in a rough, almost childlike style. Alongside his illustration work, Shrigley is also a noted painter, sculptor, filmmaker and photographer, and has recorded spoken word albums of his writing and poetry.

== Early life and education ==
Shrigley was born 17 September 1968 in Macclesfield, Cheshire. He moved with his parents and sister to Oadby, Leicestershire when he was two years old. He attended Beauchamp College in Oadby. He took the Art and Design Foundation course at Leicester Polytechnic in 1987, and then studied environmental art at Glasgow School of Art from 1988 to 1991. Talking about his final degree show, Shrigley later told The Guardian's Becky Barnicoat, "I thought my degree show was brilliant, but the people who were marking it didn't. I got a 2:2. They didn't appreciate my genius.[…] I didn't sell anything at the show – it was 1991, before the YBAs. There wasn't a precedent for people selling work that wasn't figurative painting". Before becoming a full-time artist, Shrigley worked as a gallery guide at the CCA in Glasgow, where he would use the gallery's equipment to self-publish a series of books of his drawings.

== Work ==
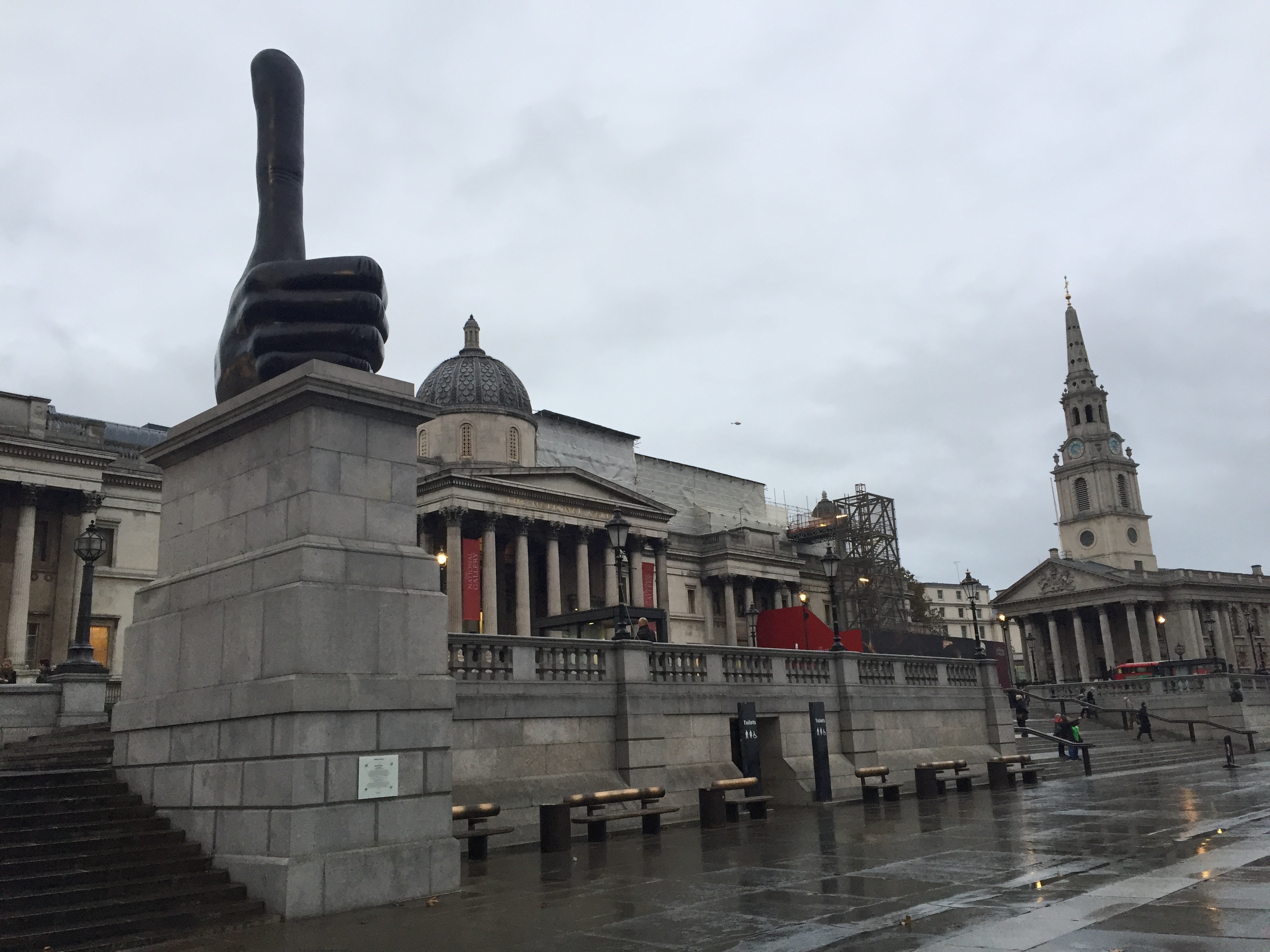
'Really Good' at Trafalgar Square's fourth plinth

As well as authoring several books, he directed the video for Blur's "Good Song" and also for Bonnie 'Prince' Billy's "Agnes, Queen of Sorrow". In 2005 he designed a London Underground leaflet cover. Since 2005, he has contributed a cartoon for The Guardian's Weekend magazine every Saturday. Other projects have included the album Worried Noodles (Tom Lab, 2007) where musicians interpret his writings as lyrics, including collaborations by David Byrne, Hot Chip, R. Stevie Moore and Franz Ferdinand.

Shrigley co-directed a short film with director Chris Shepherd called Who I Am And What I Want (2005), based on Shrigley's book of the same title, with Kevin Eldon voicing its main character, Pete. Shrigley also produced a series of drawings and t-shirt designs for the 2006 Triptych festival, a Scottish music festival lasting for three to four days in three cities. He also designed twelve different covers for Deerhoof's 2007 record, Friend Opportunity. In the same year he also designed the title sequence for the film Hallam Foe, as well as the drawings and the writing in Hallam's on-screen diaries.

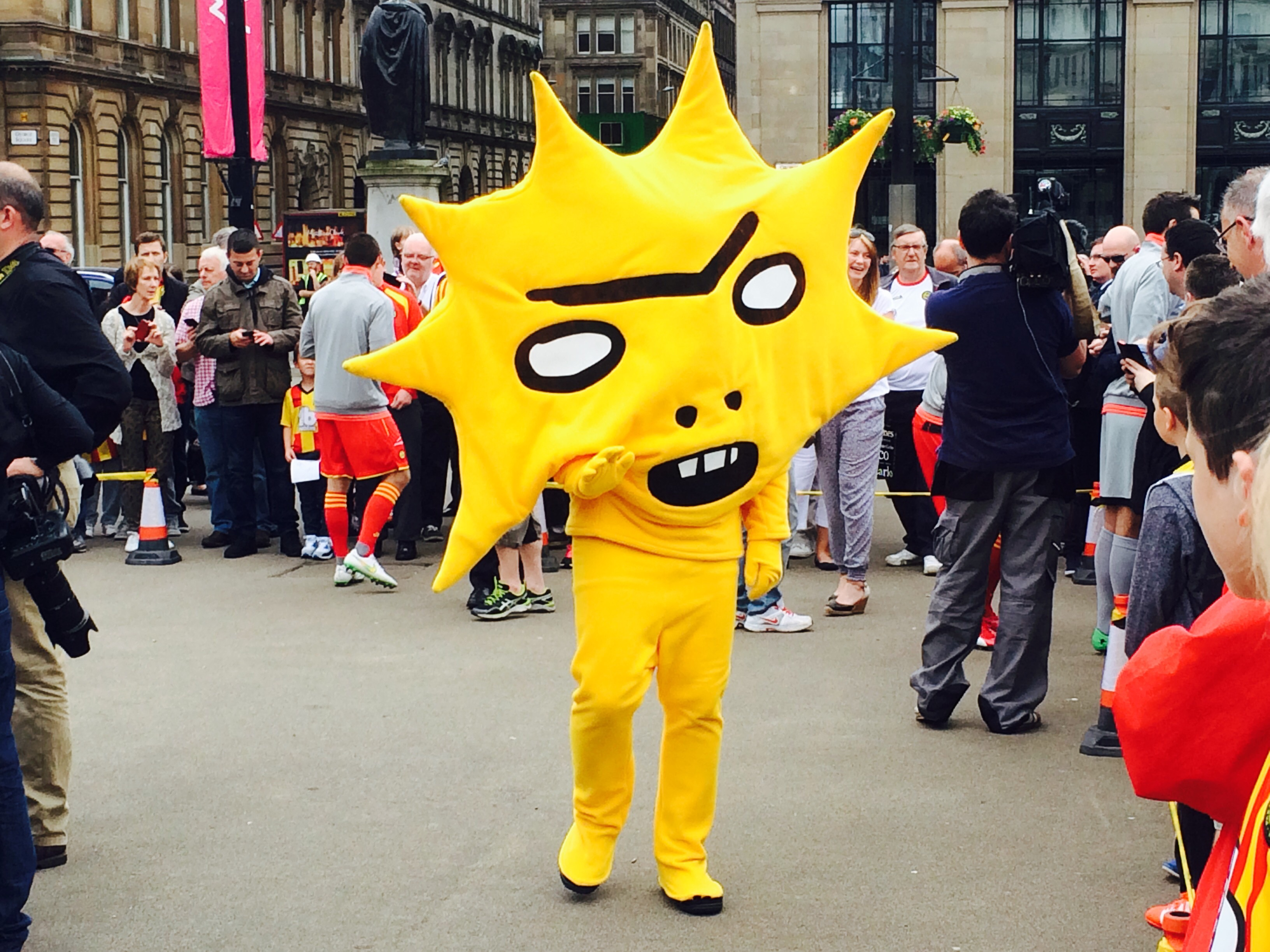
Shrigley's mascot for Scottish football team Partick Thistle, "Kingsley" in George Square, Glasgow

In 2014, Jonathan Jones reviewed Shrigley's work Brass Tooth, writing, "David Shrigley must have had a big, toothy grin when he created multiple editions of his sculpture Brass Tooth, which goes on sale for £1,200 a pop at the London art fair this week. It is a cast of a single tooth – including the roots – and is typical of Shrigley's sly, subversive, humorous art in how it brings a modern art cliche crashing down to Earth".

In 2015, he designed "Kingsley", a mascot for Scottish football team Partick Thistle as part of a sponsorship deal. The mascot's design was the object of some amusement, with Scottish BuzzFeed reporter Jamie Ross describing it as "based on every nightmare I had as a child."

Shrigley also undertook a residency at Auckland's Two Rooms in 2015, during which he painted for the first time since his graduation from The Glasgow School of Art in 1991. He said that the residency presented ‘an opportunity to explore a different medium and explore what you can do with “that” versus what you do with “this”.'

Shrigley's sculpture Really Good was installed on Trafalgar Square's Fourth plinth between September 2016 and March 2018. He was granted £130,000 by the London mayor's office to make the work. Shrigley has said "I don't think I'll ever get to do anything that meant more to me".

In 2019, he designed the yellow and red card of the AS Velasca.

Shrigley was appointed Officer of the Order of the British Empire (OBE) in the 2020 New Year Honours for services to visual arts.

In October 2024, Shrigley proposed expanding STEM subjects to include the arts, in response to the significant decline in the number of arts students in England. He argued that the current focus on mathematics and sciences stifles children's creativity and suggested changing the acronym STEM to STEAM to better reflect the importance of the arts in a well-rounded education. As part of his response to this issue, Shrigley installed a new work titled Mantis Muse at his former college in Oadby — a massive sculpture of a praying mantis.

In November 2024, Birmingham City University responded to Shrigley’s call. The university announced the development of the UK’s first Ofqual-recognised primary STEAM teaching qualification, created in collaboration with its arts, design, and media faculty. The new qualification equips primary school teachers with advanced skills in computer-aided design, 3D printing, and robotics while emphasizing design thinking and creative problem-solving.

== Exhibitions ==
Recent notable solo exhibitions include Do Not Touch the Worms, Copenhagen Contemporary, Denmark (2020); Exhibition of Inflatable Swan Things, Spritmuseum, Stockholm, Sweden (2018); David Shrigley, Hall Art Foundation, Reading, Vermont, USA (2017); Life Model II, Rose Art Museum, Waltham, Mass., USA (2016); David Shrigley: Life and Life Drawing, National Gallery of Victoria, Melbourne, Australia (2014); David Shrigley: Brain Activity, YBCA, San Francisco (2012) Animate, Turku Art Museum, Finland (2011); Kelvingrove Museum, Glasgow International Festival of Visual Arts, Glasgow, Scotland (2010); New Powers, Kunsthalle Mainz, Germany (2009); David Shrigley, Museum Ludwig, Cologne, Germany (2008); Baltic Centre for Contemporary Art, Gateshead, UK (2008); Everything Must Have a Name, Malmö Konsthall, Malmo, Sweden (2007), M.E.M.E. Art Gallery in Manchester, and David Shrigley, Dundee Contemporary Arts, Dundee, Scotland (2006).

Jason Mraz took the name of his album We Sing. We Dance. We Steal Things. from a work by Shrigley.

In January 2016, Shrigley's work was part of a British Council-organised international touring exhibition. Previewing the touring David Shrigley: Lose Your Mind exhibition before it opened in Guadalajara, Mexico, BBC Arts said: "Best known for his crudely composed and mordantly humorous cartoons, David Shrigley is a highly popular British artist […] Featuring works as diverse as cartoonish ceramic boots, doodle-like drawings and a headless, stuffed ostrich, the exhibition highlights Shrigley's lively, irreverent imagination in full flow". In the same month, he contributed to the Liverpool Provocations event in Liverpool's city centre.

In 2020, Shrigley released a body of work entitled 'Lockdown Drawings'. 340 pieces of art inspired by the UK's coronavirus lockdown in spring 2020 were displayed in the Stephen Friedman Gallery.

In 2021, Shrigley staged a conceptual exhibition 'Mayfair Tennis Ball Exchange'. where the gallery was filled with new tennis balls, participants were encouraged to exchange the balls for ones of their own.

A further conceptual exhibition 'Pulped Fiction' was announced in 2023. Shrigley purchased thousands of copies of Dan Brown’s The Da Vinci Code, pulped them, made paper and printed copies of George Orwell’s Nineteen Eighty Four.

In November 2025, Shrigley unveiled a new exhibition installation at Stephen Friedman Gallery entitled 'Exhibition of Old Rope', consisting of 10 tons of used and discarded rope, including cruise ship mooring lines, scaffolding rope and climbing rope. The work had a £1 million price tag; The Guardian described the work as "disarming and charming", despite being "literally money for old rope."

== Publications ==
- This Is A Paper Trinket For You To Wear
- How Are You Feeling
- To Make Meringue You Must
- Man in a Room
- Do Not Bend
- The Book of Shrigley
- Ants Have Sex in Your Beer
- Slug Trails
- Merry Eczema
- Blanket of Filth
- Enquire Within
- Let Not These Shadows Fall Upon Thee
- Err
- Drawings Done Whilst on the Phone To Idiot
- Why We Got The Sack From The Museum
- Centre Parting
- Order of Service
- To Make Meringue You Must Beat The Egg Whites Until They Look Like This
- Blank Page And Other Pages
- The Beast Is Near
- Hard Work
- Leotard
- Joy
- Yellow Bird With Worm
- Human Achievement
- Who I Am And What I Want
- Let's Wrestle
- Rules
- Kill Your Pets
- It Is It
- Blocked Path
- Photographs with Text
- Worried Noodles – The Empty Sleeve
- Hand
- Red Book
- What The Hell Are You Doing? The Essential David Shrigley
- Fragments of Torn Up Drawings
- Weak Messages Create Bad Situations

== Music ==
In 2006, Shrigley's first spoken word album Shrigley Forced to Speak With Others was released by Azuli Records, under their Late Night Tales label. In October 2007, Tomlab released Worried Noodles, a double CD of artists including David Byrne, Islands, Liars, Grizzly Bear, Mount Eerie, R. Stevie Moore and Final Fantasy putting Shrigley's 2005 book of the same name to music. Moore went on to record an entire album of new songs set to Shrigley's Worried Noodles lyrics called Shrigley Field.

== Awards ==
Shrigley was nominated for the 2013 Turner Prize. He was awarded an honorary doctorate by Leicester's De Montfort University at a ceremony on 17 July 2014.
