= The Understudy (2008 film) =

- Film poster
- Directed by: David Conolly; Hannah Davis
- Written by: David Conolly; Hannah Davis
- Starring: Marin Ireland; Paul Sparks; Aasif Mandvi; Kelli Giddish; Richard Kind; Neko Parham; Scott Cohen; Reiko Aylesworth; David Melville; Gloria Reuben
- Music by: Carl Davis
- Production company: Mansion Pictures
- Release date: 25 June 2008 (Avignon Film Festival)
- Country: United Kingdom
- Language: English

The Understudy is a 2008 black comedy film directed by David Conolly and Hannah Davis. It stars Marin Ireland, Paul Sparks, Aasif Mandvi, and Richard Kind. The film debuted at the Avignon Film Festival on 25 June 2008, but did not get a release in the United States until 2012.

== Plot ==
Rebecca is an unemployed actress who is living with an equally unsuccessful screenwriter, Sarfras. Rebecca makes a living by caring for a blind and diabetic woman while going from one disastrous relationship to the next.

Rebecca is invited to understudy the famous movie star Simone Harwin in an off-Broadway production of Electra. However, Rebecca's unfulfillment is compounded: despite outshining Simone with her own talent, Rebecca is treated as second-class, either bullied or ignored by the cast and crew, which includes the director Ian and stage manager Alison. Her salvation lies within her relationship with the seemingly perfect firefighter Bobby.

Accidents start to disrupt the leading ladies of Electra, and as Rebecca's star begins to rise, suspicion surrounds her.

== Cast ==
- Marin Ireland as Rebecca
- Paul Sparks as Bobby
- Aasif Mandvi as Sarfras
- Richard Kind as Ian
- Tom Wopat as Detective Jones
- Gloria Reuben as Greta
- Reiko Aylesworth as Kinsky
- Kerry Bishé as April
- Jean Boht as Mrs. Davido
- Carl Davis as Mr Davido
- Adrian Martinez as Guard
- Kelli Giddish as Simone

== Critical reception ==
Neil Genzlinger of The New York Times said, "The film’s downfall is its clumsy mix of serious drama and attempts at humor through tired theater clichés. Its writers and directors, David Conolly and Hannah Davis, would have done better to jettison a few plotlines and make a movie with a consistent tone." In The Village Voice, Andrew Schenker said the film "[refuses] to commit to being either a character-based ethical drama or a wicked showbiz satire".
