= Johnno's Dead =

- Directed by: Chris Shepherd
- Written by: Chris Shepherd
- Produced by: Nicolas Schmerkin; Abigail Addison
- Starring: Ian Hart; Chris Freeney; Dave Kent
- Cinematography: Peter Elmore; Paul Teverini
- Edited by: Miikka Leskinen
- Music by: Oliver Davis
- Distributed by: Autour de Minuit; Polkadot
- Release date: 2 December 2016 (London International Animation Festival)
- Running time: 8 minutes
- Country: United Kingdom
- Language: English

Johnno's Dead is an 8-minute film written and directed by Chris Shepherd and produced by Nicolas Schmerkin and Abigail Addison. Distributed by Autour de Minuit in co-production with Polkadot, the film was first transmitted on the Arte France and Germany, and premiered in the UK on 2 December 2016 at the London International Animation Festival.

Johnno's Dead is a sequel to Shepherd's multi award-winning 2003 short film Dad's Dead, combining animation techniques (including CGI animation) with live action. It stars three members of the original cast, Ian Hart, Chris Freeney, and Dave Kent, along with newcomers such as Nathan Turner.

== Plot ==
The narrative picks up the story where the narrator goes to prison after the fire in the tower block which was caused by his best friend Johnno. The narrator is released from prison and has to adjust to life outside after serving 13 years.

== Cast ==
- Ian Hart as Narrator
- Chris Freeney as Johnno
- Dave Kent as Old Man
- Paul Endacott, Otis Waby, Sean Bell, Theo Franklinos, Aaron Lucas and Toby Crowley as Prisoners
- Jamie Jenkins as Model
- Trudi Jackson as Ideal Mother
- Michael Dixon as Ideal Father
- Robert Shepherd as Ideal Son
- Luna Rose Sarafoglou as Ideal Daughter
- Jo Kynaston, Bethany Godfrey and James Atherton as Real Estate Agents
- Katie Ellen-Jone as Woman at ATM
- Nathan Turner as Street Victim

== Awards ==
- 2016 - Best British Film - London International Animation Festival, London, UK
- 2017 - Special Mention - Cardiff International Animation Festival, London, UK
- 2017 - TV Shorts ONVI Award - Brest European Film Festival, France
- 2017 - Best Animation - Aesthetica International Film Festival, UK
- 2017 - Best Animated Film - Crystal Palace International Film Festival, UK
- 2018 - Experimental - Brooklyn Film Festival, USA
