= Den of Lions =

- Den of Lions DVD cover
- Directed by: James Bruce
- Written by: James Bruce; Freddy Deane
- Produced by: Daphne Lerner; Váradi Gábor
- Starring: Stephen Dorff; Bob Hoskins; Ian Hart; Zita Görög; Laura Fraser
- Cinematography: Jean-François Robin
- Edited by: Kaman
- Music by: Ron Hay
- Release dates: May 13, 2003 (Italy); February 5, 2006 (Hungary); March 7, 2006 (United States)
- Running time: 100 minutes
- Countries: United States; Hungary
- Language: English
- Budget: $6,000,000 (estimated)

Den of Lions (Hungarian title: Oroszlánbarlang) is a 2003 film directed and written by James Bruce and produced by Daphne Lerner and Váradi Gábor. It is a violent direct-to-video B movie, starring relatively famous actors like Stephen Dorff, Bob Hoskins and more.

== Plot ==
Den of Lions follows Mike Varga, an undercover American intelligence agent sent to Eastern Europe to infiltrate a Russian organized crime network operating in Hungary. His mission is to gain the trust of two powerful mafia brothers, Sergei and Yuri, who control a criminal organization involved in arms trafficking, smuggling, and other illegal activities. Mike travels to Budapest posing as a former criminal looking for work. Through a series of encounters, he gradually earns the confidence of Sergei and Yuri and becomes involved in their operations. As he gains access to the inner circle of the organization, he secretly gathers information and passes it to his superiors to help build a case against the group. During his time with the organization, Mike becomes romantically involved with Katya, Sergei’s sister. Their relationship complicates his mission, as Katya grows suspicious of his past and his true intentions. Meanwhile, the criminal group prepares for a large international weapons deal that could significantly expand their influence. As the operation moves forward, Mike’s cover is nearly exposed, placing him and those around him in danger. Law enforcement eventually moves against the criminal organization, leading to a violent confrontation in which several members of the group are arrested or killed. The operation successfully dismantles the network, but Mike’s relationship with Katya collapses after she learns about his true identity. The film ends with Mike leaving Hungary after completing his mission.

== Cast ==
- Stephen Dorff as FBI Agent Mike Varga
- Bob Hoskins as Darius Paskevic
- Laura Fraser as Katya Paskevic
- Ian Hart as FBI Agent Rob Shepard
- David O'Hara as Ferko Kurchina
- József Gyabronka as MTI Agent Laszlo Juskus
- Andrew McCulloch as MTI Agent Gyurka Kovacs
- Tania Emery as Rita
- Philip Madoc as Grandpa Marcus Varga
- Athina Papadimitriu as Aunt Bardi Varga
- Zita Görög as Nico (as Zita Gorog)
- Attila Szatmari as Tomasz Nazarov
- Sarah Ann Schultz as Anna Nazarova
- Nabil Massad as Haznl
- Robert Wilcox as Yakov
- Billie Kaman as Gabi
- Mike Kelly as Simon
- Akos Horvath as Rita's Husband
- Mark Urban as Rita's Son
