= One Summer =

1983 British television drama series

- One Summer blu-ray cover
- Genre: Drama
- Written by: Willy Russell
- Directed by: Gordon Flemyng
- Starring: David Morrissey; James Hazeldine; Spencer Leigh; Ian Davies; Jane West
- Composer: Alan Parker
- Country of origin: United Kingdom
- Original language: English
- No. of episodes: 5 x 50 min.

Production
- Executive producer: David Cunliffe
- Producer: Keith Richardson
- Cinematography: Peter Jackson
- Editor: Barry Reynolds
- Production companies: Yorkshire Television (for Channel 4)

Original release
- Network: Channel 4
- Release: 7 August – 4 September 1983

One Summer is a 1983 British television drama serial written by Willy Russell and directed by Gordon Flemyng. It stars David Morrissey and Spencer Leigh as two 16-year-old Liverpool boys from broken homes who escape from their grim lives by running away to Wales one summer. It also starred James Hazeldine and Ian Hart (credited in the series as Ian Davies). The five-part series was shown on Channel 4 from 7 August to 4 September 1983. It was repeated on ITV in April 1985.

== Synopsis ==
Sixteen-year-old Billy Rizley (Morrissey) comes from a broken home in Liverpool. Living in abject poverty on a squalid council estate, his father is absent, his older sister despises him, and his mother has depression and is uncaring towards him. Billy and his slightly dimwitted friend Icky (Leigh) have truanted from school for some time and have fallen into a life of delinquency, regularly stealing, fighting with local gangs, and getting into trouble with the police. Billy is already on probation and it seems only a matter of time before his life of crime and violence results in his incarceration. When the pair decide to go back into school in order to go on a school camping trip to Wales, they are rebuffed by their teacher. With no direction or prospects in life, the pair decide to run away to Wales by themselves, the last place Billy had any happy memories when he went away on a previous school trip some years earlier. Billy steals some money from his mother to facilitate their trip. They travel into Wales beyond the limit of their rail tickets, and when the train conductors attempt to detain them, they escape by leaping from the moving train. They continue their journey on foot, with little regard or understanding of their new rural surroundings, which are a stark contrast to the urban environment they come from. They later steal a tractor which they use for joyriding, causing havoc in a local village. Billy eventually finds the location of the previous school camp, but realises it to be just a hillside stretch of land and not a permanent camp site. His attempts to recreate the camp environment end in frustration. They try to find shelter for the night in a barn at a secluded farm, but are caught by the farmer and his wife. Though they take pity on the two boys and let them spend the night in the house, in the morning Billy and Icky make a quick getaway from the farmhouse when the police arrive.

Wandering through the Welsh countryside, they come across an old cottage which they initially believe is deserted. Hoping to find shelter inside, they come face to face with Kidder (Hazeldine), the man who lives there. Kidder lives the life of a hermit, preferring to keep to himself. Completely self-sufficient, he works as an artist, selling his paintings at a local market, keeps livestock and grows his own food. He reluctantly allows the boys to stay for a night but tells them they have to leave after that. Hoping to change Kidder's mind, the boys begin to do chores around the house and the grounds outside, but Icky breaks all of Kidder's plates in the river when he is supposed to be washing them. The boys set out to find replacement plates and end up stealing some from a nearby house. When they return they find a gang of local Welsh youths vandalising Kidder's house. They chase them off, and eventually Kidder agrees to let them stay, but Billy is later beaten up by the local gang. Meanwhile, Kidder discovers Icky is illiterate and, being a former schoolteacher, begins teaching him how to read.

While Billy and Kidder are away at the local market, Icky goes out on his own and discovers the boys and teachers from his school are now at the camp site that he and Billy had come to Wales to find. However, when he brings some of the boys back to Kidder's house, they get drunk and vandalise the house. One of the boys, Rabbit (Hart), steals Kidder's money from a drawer. Meanwhile, at the market, Billy meets Jo, a pretty and intelligent girl from a middle-class family who only live in Wales during each summer. Later, when Billy gets back to the house, he finds Icky sleeping off a hangover and Kidder's money gone. They go to the camp site and get the money back, threatening Rabbit not to reveal to anyone where they are living. Kidder gives the boys handmade books that he wrote and illustrated for them about their adventures. One night, the three of them go to a local dance where Billy sees Jo again. As they begin a romantic relationship, Icky grows jealous and restless and decides to return to Liverpool alone.

Back in Liverpool, Icky and the gang from school steal a car and drive to Southport. While there, they again come into conflict with a rival Liverpudlian gang and Rabbit stabs one of them. Icky later abandons the gang and tries to drive back to Wales, but he is chased by the police and is killed when he crashes the stolen car. Back in Wales, the local police come looking for Billy at Kidder's house. As Billy is hiding from them, he overhears their conversation and learns that Kidder is gay and once had an affair with an 18-year-old male student (a criminal offence at the time) at the school where he worked. Though the affair was consensual, he lost his job as a teacher and served a prison sentence for it. Distraught at what he hears, Billy runs away from Kidder's house and finds Jo. She reasons with him and dispels his homophobic thoughts about Kidder, and she and Billy then make love near a lake. When he later returns to Kidder's house, Billy sees two police officers from Liverpool who have come to take him back home because he has broken the conditions of his probation. The police officers begin assaulting Kidder to make him tell them where Billy is. Rather than run away, Billy comes to Kidder's defence and stops the police from hurting him further. Billy is then taken back to his grim life in Liverpool by the police officers, his summer in Wales over.

== Production ==
The series was written after scriptwriter Willy Russell was approached by Yorkshire Television about producing a follow-up to his 1979 television play The Daughters of Albion. Russell pitched the idea of a six-part series, originally called "Ten Thousand Miles", but later changed to One Summer and condensed to five episodes. Produced by Yorkshire Television for the then-new Channel 4 station, the series was filmed from April to October 1982 in Liverpool, Yorkshire and Wales.

According to actor David Morrissey, he originally read for the part of Icky, and fellow Liverpudlian actor Paul McGann read for the part of Billy. However, McGann (who is five years older than Morrissey, and was 22 at the time) decided he was too old to play the role and told Morrissey he should be playing it instead.

Willy Russell initially had his name removed from the credits for the series' original 1983 transmission after disagreements with the producers and director, particularly taking umbrage to the casting of Morrissey and Leigh whom he considered too old to portray the lead characters. Russell had originally envisioned Billy and Icky as slightly younger 15 year olds, but this was changed to make them imminent school leavers without his approval (Morrissey was 17 when filming commenced and turned 18 during the production, whereas Leigh was 19 at the time of filming). However, when the series was repeated on ITV in 1985, Russell's screen credit had been restored. In later years, Russell stated his intention to write a film adaptation of One Summer, though this never came to pass.

== Reception ==
Writing in The Guardian, TV critic Nancy Banks-Smith reviewed the first episode and opined that Morrissey and Leigh "make very creditable first appearances on television", and that Leigh's "mixture of comedy and pathos was (...) particularly promising." However, she did agree to some extent with writer Willy Russell's assertion that the actors were perhaps a little too old to be playing 16-year-old boys, commenting on Morrissey's height in particular: "He is taller than most policemen you meet. With their hats on. On their horses." She elaborated by saying, "The dialogue of illiterate boys in the mouths of young men implies they are mentally retarded, and that is quite another kind of play. This sort of casting happens (...) but it makes life harder for the viewer." She praised the grey, gritty, realistic depictions of Liverpool at the time, noting that "Billy and Icky's Liverpool is wild, treacherous, and serrated. A place of compulsive theft (...) and sudden, savage pursuit." She went on to say that the series was well worth staying with as it was better than most weekend television.

Writing in the Daily Mirror after watching the first episode, journalist and playwright Mary Kenny also praised Morrissey and Leigh's performances, but disagreed with Russell's stance on their casting. "Critics would be wrong if they were to judge a work only by the name of the author instead of on its merits. As it happens, the merits of One Summer are very considerable in my view. And the evidence is that Willy Russell was wrong in damning the casting. David Morrissey and Spencer Leigh are most beguiling as the two Liverpool truant lads Billy and Icky."

Writing in the now-defunct local newspaper, the Liverpool Daily Post, John Williams declared the series as "simultaneously compulsive and depressing" and "grimly authentic".

== Commercial release ==
DVD release (2006)

One Summer was released on DVD in 2006 by Network. The two-disc set includes all five episodes, and commentaries and interviews with Morrissey, Leigh and Hart, as well as music-only audio tracks on two episodes (the music-only tracks comprise Alan Parker's entire score for the series, along with alternate cues).

The series was re-released by Network on Blu-ray in September 2020, remastered in 2K high definition from the original 16mm film elements. Extras on this release include alternative takes of scenes with less explicit language filmed for pre-watershed transmission. The commentaries, interviews and music-only audio tracks from the 2006 DVD set are not included.

The series soundtrack, composed and performed by Alan Parker, was released in 2016 on vinyl and digital. The album comprises 11 tracks.
