= Bad Night for the Blues =

- Directed by: Chris Shepherd
- Written by: Chris Shepherd
- Produced by: Maria Manton
- Starring: Jean Boht; Keiran Lynn; Lloyd McGuire; Amanda Walker; Marline Sidaway; Ann Beach; Kay Noone
- Edited by: Nick Fenton
- Distributed by: Dazzel, Chris Shepherd Films
- Release date: 13 November 2010 (Salford Film Festival)
- Running time: 15 minutes
- Country: United Kingdom
- Language: English

Bad Night for the Blues is a 2010 British short comedy film written and directed by Chris Shepherd and produced by Maria Manton. It was first transmitted on the BBC on 27 February 2011, and in France on 2 April 2011 as a part of Mickrocine on Canal+ Cinecinema. Other countries to transmit the film include Spain, Italy and Africa. The film is based on a real-life event and is the last film to be made by production company Slinky Pictures.

== Plot ==
Chris takes his aunt Glad to her local Conservative Club for a Christmas party only to find she has a grudge with another club member, Elizabeth. As the night unfolds Chis has trouble controlling his aunt and the night descends further into embarrassing conflict.

== Cast ==
- Keiran Lynn as Chris
- Jean Boht as Glad
- Amanda Walker as Elizabeth
- Ann Beach as Madge
- Lloyd McGuire as Master of Ceremonies
- Marline Sidaway as Grace
- Kay Noone as Maureen
- Deddie Davies as Veronica
- Tom HIllenbrand as Toilet Tory
- Doreen Kaye as organist

== Accolades ==
Winner of International Canal+ Award at 2011 Clermont Ferrand International Film Festival.
