= AS Velasca =

Football club in Italy

Associazione Sportiva Dilettantistica Velasca is a football club based in Milan, Italy.

== History ==
AS Velasca was founded in 2015 by French visual artist Wolfgang Natlacen. These Football Times referred to the club by the German word Gesamtkunstwerk, which means "total work of art."
