= Madison Ballet =

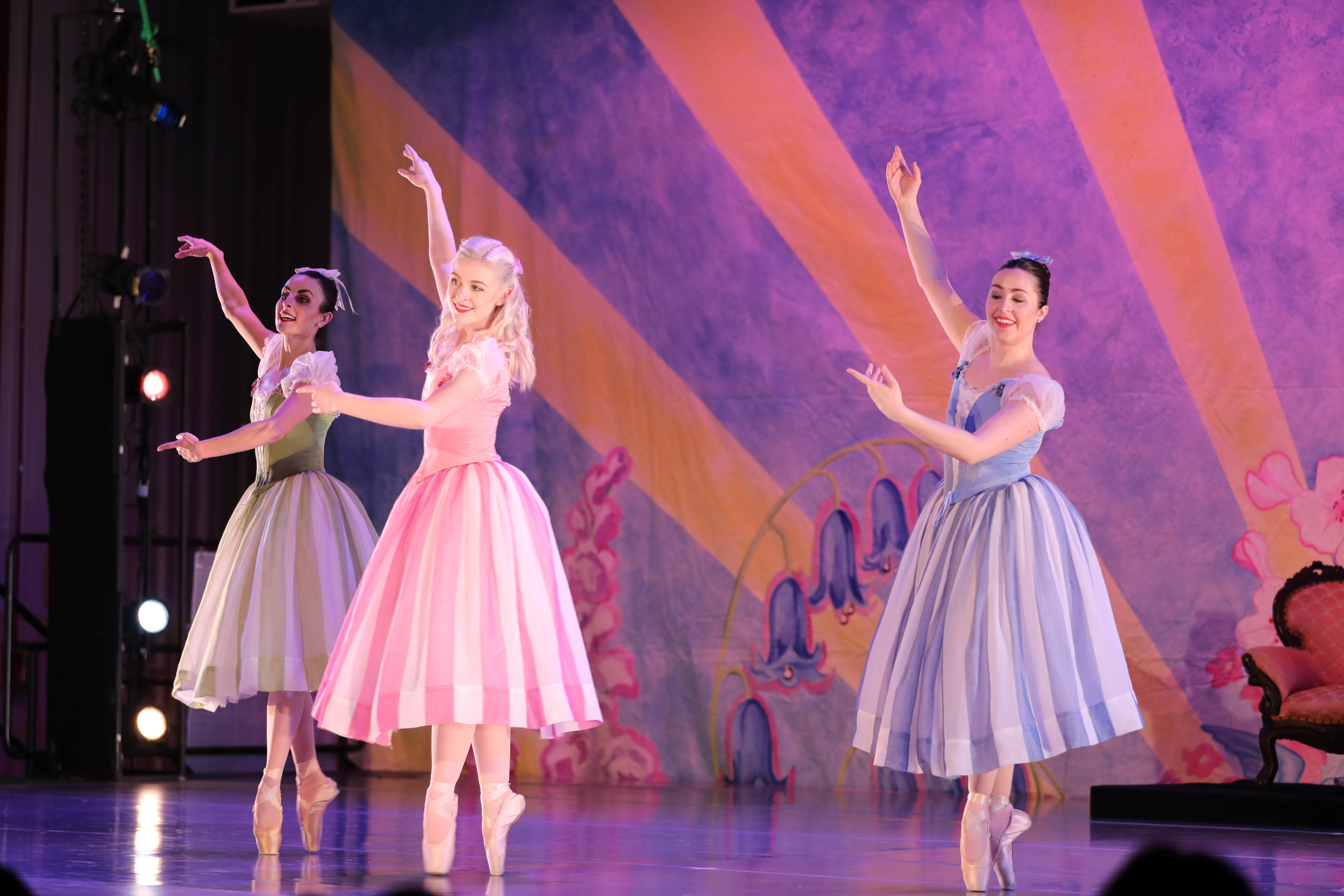
Madison Ballet dancers performing The Nutcracker in 2021.

The Madison Ballet was founded in 1981 as the Wisconsin Dance Ensemble in Madison, Wisconsin.

== School of Madison Ballet ==
In addition to its professional performances, Madison Ballet has run the School of Madison Ballet (SMB) since 2005. SMB offers ballet classes in various divisions, including three levels of children's classes, five levels in the school division, a pre-professional level designed for dancers on the cusp of a career in ballet, and a variety of open division offerings including both dance and conditioning courses. In the school division, School of Madison Ballet offers a class for boys.
