= Ian Hart =

English actor (born 1964)

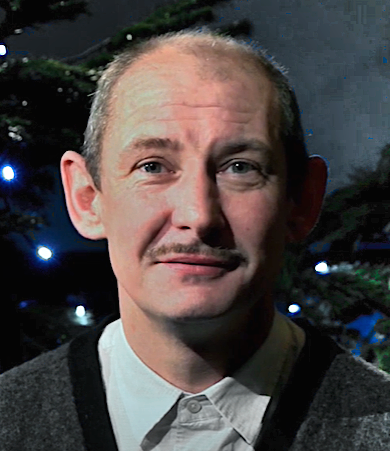
- Hart in 2016
- Born: Ian Davies; 8 October 1964 (age 62); Liverpool, England
- Education: Mabel Fletcher College of Music and Drama
- Occupation: Actor
- Years active: 1982–present
- Spouse: Lynn Hart
- Children: 2

Ian Davies (born 8 October 1964), known professionally as Ian Hart, is an English actor. His most notable screen roles have been in One Summer (1983), Land and Freedom (1995), Nothing Personal (also 1995), Michael Collins (1996), Liam (2000), as Professor Quirrell in Harry Potter and the Philosopher's Stone (2001), as Ludwig van Beethoven in Eroica (2003), as Brian Keenan in Blind Flight (also 2003), as Kester Gill on My Mad Fat Diary (2013–15), as Father Beocca on The Last Kingdom (2015–20), and as Carl on The Responder (2022). He is also known for playing musician John Lennon in multiple productions, including the 1994 biopic Backbeat.

Hart won the Volpi Cup for Best Supporting Performer for his performance in Nothing Personal. He is also a three-time British Independent Film Award nominee and a BAFTA Scotland Award nominee, among other accolades.

== Early life ==
Hart was born Ian Davies, in the Knotty Ash district of Liverpool on 8 October 1964. He has two siblings and was brought up in an Irish Catholic family. He attended Cardinal Heenan Grammar School in Liverpool's West Derby suburb, and was a member of the Everyman Youth Theatre, Liverpool, in his earlier years. He studied drama at the now-defunct Mabel Fletcher College of Music and Drama in Liverpool's Wavertree district.

== Career ==
In 1983, a 19-year-old Hart (credited by his birth name) starred in the television serial One Summer, alongside David Morrissey.

In 1991, Hart played John Lennon in the low-budget independent film The Hours and Times. He played Lennon twice more: a slightly younger Lennon during the Beatles' 1960-62 Hamburg period in Backbeat (1994), and a 50-year-old Lennon (having avoided his true fate at age 40) in the Playhouse Presents television production Snodgrass (2013).

In 1995, Hart portrayed a POUM militia volunteer in Ken Loach's Spanish Civil War film Land and Freedom. The same year, he played psychotic Northern Irish Protestant gangster 'Ginger' in the Thaddeus O'Sullivan directed 1995 Irish-British drama film Nothing Personal, alongside John Lynch, James Frain and Michael Gambon, for which, Hart won the Volpi Cup for best supporting actor at the 52nd Venice International Film Festival.

In 2000, he was back in Liverpool as an unemployed shipyard worker, father of three, including the protagonist, in the film Liam. His best-known role, however, is perhaps that of Professor Quirrell in Harry Potter and the Sorcerer's Stone (2001). He also provided the voice and motion capture for the computer-generated face of Lord Voldemort.

In 2003, Hart and fellow actor Linus Roache fasted for three months and lost 2 stones each, to achieve a malnourished look for the filming of Blind Flight, where he played Middle-Eastern hostage Brian Keenan.

In 2004, Hart played Sir Arthur Conan Doyle in the film Finding Neverland, having already played Doyle's creation Dr. Watson in a BBC One television film of The Hound of the Baskervilles in 2002, and reprising the role in 2004 in Sherlock Holmes and the Case of the Silk Stocking, with a different actor playing Sherlock Holmes. He also played schizophrenic paparazzo Don Konkey in the FX series Dirt in 2007 and 2008.

In 2009 he played Tom Ripley in BBC Radio Four's adaptations of all five of Patricia Highsmith's "Ripliad" series. The same year, Hart worked alongside John Simm at the Duke of York's Theatre production of Andrew Bovell's play Speaking in Tongues.

In 2011, he played Adolf Hitler in the BBC drama The Man Who Crossed Hitler.

In 2015, he landed the role of Father Beocca in The Last Kingdom and remained as a main character until the end of series 4 in 2020.

In 2018, he starred as Sailing Master Thomas Blanky in the AMC produced series The Terror.

In 2022, Hart was back in Liverpool playing drug dealer Carl Sweeney, in the BBC One British police drama series The Responder alongside Martin Freeman.

== Personal life ==
In order to relax and unwind Hart has participated in kung-fu.

Hart is a supporter of Everton Football Club.

== Filmography ==
=== Film ===
Year	Title	Role	Notes
1985	No Surrender	Uncertain Menace	
1988	The Zip	Son	Short film
1991	The Hours and Times	John Lennon	
1994	Backbeat	John Lennon	
1995	Land and Freedom	David Carr	
1995	The Englishman Who Went Up a Hill But Came Down a Mountain	Johnny 'Shellshocked'	
1995	Clockwork Mice	Steve	
1995	Nothing Personal	Ginger	
1996	Hollow Reed	Tom Dixon	
1996	Michael Collins	Joe O'Reilly	
1997	Gold in the Streets	Des	
1997	Robinson Crusoe	Daniel Defoe	
1997	The Butcher Boy	Uncle Alo	
1997	Mojo	Mickey	
1998	Monument Ave.	'Mouse'	
1998	Frogs for Snakes	Quint	
1998	B. Monkey	Steve Davis	
1998	Enemy of the State	NSA Agent John Bingham	
1999	This Year's Love	Liam	
1999	Wonderland	Dan	
1999	Spring Forward	Fran	
1999	The End of the Affair	Mr. Parkis	
1999	Bait	Dad	Short film
2000	The Closer You Get	Kieran O'Donnell	
2000	Best	Nobby Stiles	
2000	Aberdeen	Clive	
2000	Liam	Dad	
2000	Born Romantic	Second Cab Driver	
2000	Bring Me Your Love	Harry Weaver	Short film
2001	Strictly Sinatra	Toni Cocozza	
2001	Harry Potter and the Philosopher's Stone	Professor Quirrell / Lord Voldemort	
2002	Killing Me Softly	Senior Police Officer	
2002	Unhinged	Eric	Short film
2003	Den of Lions	FBI Agent Rob Shepard	
2003	Cheeky	Alan	
2003	Blind Flight	Brian Keenan	
2004	Every Seven Years	Liam	Short film
2004	Finding Neverland	Sir Arthur Conan Doyle	
2004	Strings	Ghrak (voice)	English dub
2005	A Cock and Bull Story	Joe	
2005	Rag Tale	Morph, Photographer	
2005	Breakfast on Pluto	PC Wallis	
2005	Ripley Under Ground	Bernard Sayles	
2006	Trigger Happy	The Man	Short film
2007	Intervention	Harry III Jr.	
2007	Both	Moussa	Short film
2007	A Girl and a Gun	Johnny	
2007	Int. Bedsit – Day	Pete	Short film
2008	Still Waters Burn	Jack Price	
2009	Morris: A Life with Bells On	Endeavour	
2009	A Boy Called Dad	Joe	
2009	Within the Whirlwind	Beylin	
2010	Watching	Carrik	Short film
2011	Harry Potter and the Deathly Hallows – Part 2	Professor Quirrell	Archive footage; uncredited role
2012	Hard Boiled Sweets	Joyce	
2014	Conversation with a Cigarette	(unknown)	Short film
2015	Dough	Victor Gerrard	
2015	Urban Hymn	Ian Wilson	
2016	Native	Telepathic voice	
2016	Johnno's Dead	Narrator (voice)	Short film
2016	Dusty and Me	'Big Eddie'	
2017	God's Own Country	Martin Saxby	
2017	uk18	Darren	
2017	Modern Life Is Rubbish	The Curve	
2018	Mary Queen of Scots	Lord Maitland	
2019	The Sands of Venus	Daniel	Short film
2020	The 11th Green	James Forrestal	
2020	Through the Dunes	Andy	Short film
2020	Escape from Pretoria	Denis Goldberg	
2022	Florian	Gary	Short film
2022	Marlowe	Detective Joe Green	
2022	Left Over	Mick	Short film
2023	Shoshana	Robert Chambers	
TBA	Luther 3 †	TBA	Filming
TBA	The Custom of the Country †		Filming

=== Television ===
Year	Title	Role	Notes
1983	One Summer	'Rabbit'	Miniseries. Credited as Ian Davies
1984	Travelling Man	Kyffin Rees	Series 1; Episode 3: "The Watcher"
1985	The Exercise	Cadet Pritchard	Television film
1985	The Brothers McGregor	Youth	Series 1; Episode 1: "The Getaway Car"
1986	The Practice	William Griffin	Series 2; Episodes 3, 6 & 18
1986	The Monocled Mutineer	Medic	Episode 2: "Before the Shambles"
1987	The Marksman	Comic	Miniseries; Episode 3
1989	The Play on One	Christie	Series 2; Episode 5: "A View of Harry Clark"
1990	Chain	Hawkins	Miniseries; Episode 2: "Vicky Elliott"
1992	Medics	John	Series 2; Episode 6
1992	EastEnders	Mick	3 episodes
1995	Loved Up	Tom	Television film
2000	Longitude	William Harrison	Miniseries; Episodes 1 & 2
2002	The Hound of the Baskervilles	Dr. John Watson	Television film
2002	Dad's Dead	Narrator (voice)	Television short film
2003	Eroica	Ludwig van Beethoven	Television film
2004	Sherlock Holmes and the Case of the Silk Stocking	Dr. John Watson	Television film
2005–06	The Virgin Queen	William Cecil, Lord Burghley	Miniseries; Episodes 1–4
2007–08	Dirt	Don Konkey	Main cast. Series 1 & 2; 20 episodes
2009	Dr. Hoo	Dr. Hoo	Television pilot
2009	Moving On	Jake	Series 1; Episode 4: "Dress to Impress"
2009	Father & Son	Tony Conroy	Miniseries; Episodes 1–4
2010	Five Daughters	DCS Stewart Gull	Miniseries; Episodes 1–3
2010	When Harvey Met Bob	Harvey Goldsmith	Television film
2011	The Man Who Crossed Hitler	Adolf Hitler	Television film
2011–12	Luck	Lonnie	Main cast. Series 1; 9 episodes
2013	Playhouse Presents	John Lennon	Series 2; Episode 2: "Snodgrass"
2013	Bates Motel	Will Decody	Series 1; Episodes 4 & 8: "Trust Me" and "A Boy and His Dog"
2013	Rogue	Buddy Wilson	Series 1; 9 episodes
2013	Agents of S.H.I.E.L.D.	Dr. Franklin Hall	Series 1; Episode 3: "The Asset"
2013–15	My Mad Fat Diary	Dr. Kester Gill	Series 1–3; 16 episodes
2014	Klondike	Soapy Smith	Miniseries; Episodes 1–6
2014	The Bridge	Man in Car / David Tate / CIA Agent Buckley	Series 2; 7 episodes
2014	The Driver	Colin Vine / Craig Vine	Miniseries; Episodes 1–3
2014	Boardwalk Empire	Ethan Thompson	Series 5; 4 episodes
2015–20	The Last Kingdom	Father Beocca	Series 1–4; 28 episodes
2016	Vinyl	Peter Grant	Episode 1: "Pilot"
2016	The Secret Agent	The Professor	Miniseries; Episodes 1–3
2018	The Terror	Thomas Blanky	Series 1; Episodes 1–10
2018	Elementary	Professor Baynes	Series 6; Episode 16: "Uncanny Valley of the Dolls"
2018	Hang Ups	Sam Travers	1 episode
2019	Urban Myths	Hans Christian Andersen	Series 3; Episode 1: "Bleak House Guest"
2020	Noughts + Crosses	Ryan McGregor, Callum & Jude's Father	Series 1; Episodes 1–4
2020	Tin Star	Michael Ryan	Series 3; Episodes 1–6
2021	Help	Steve	Television film
2021–23	The Mosquito Coast	William 'Bill' Lee	Series 1 & 2; 11 episodes
2022	Harry Potter 20th Anniversary: Return to Hogwarts	Himself	HBO Max Special
2022	The Responder	Carl Sweeney	Series 1; Episodes 1–4
2024	Mr Bates vs The Post Office	Bob Rutherford	Miniseries; Episodes 2–4
2024	Shetland	Euan Rossi	Series 9; Episodes 1–6
2026	The Blame	DCI Kenneth Walker	Main role

== Awards and nominations ==
Institution	Year	Category	Work	Result
Apolo Awards	2018	Best Supporting Actor	God's Own Country	Nominated
BAFTA Scotland Awards	2004	Best Actor	Blind Flight	Nominated
British Independent Film Awards	2001	Best Actor	Liam	Nominated
British Independent Film Awards	2004	Best Actor	Blind Flight	Nominated
British Independent Film Awards	2017	Best Supporting Actor	God's Own Country	Nominated
Chicago Film Critics Association	1995	Most Promising Actor	Backbeat	Nominated
Evening Standard British Film Awards	1995	Most Promising Newcomer	Backbeat	Won
Evening Standard British Film Awards	2018	Best Supporting Actor	God's Own Country	Nominated
Karlovy Vary International Film Festival	2000	Best Actor	Aberdeen	Won
Tribeca Festival	2004	Best Actor in a Narrative Feature	Blind Flight	Won
Venice Film Festival	1995	Best Supporting Actor	Nothing Personal	Won
