= The Broken Jaw =

- Directed by: Chris Shepherd
- Produced by: Polkadot Productions
- Distributed by: Channel 4
- Release date: 1997
- Country: United Kingdom
- Language: English

The Broken Jaw is a short animated film by Chris Shepherd produced in 1997 by Polkadot Productions for Channel 4.

== Sources ==
- https://www.imdb.com/title/tt0209948/
