= Silence Is Golden (film) =

- Directed by: Chris Shepherd
- Written by: Chris Shepherd
- Produced by: Maria Manton
- Starring: Conor Morris; Andrew Dunford; Kate McLoughlin
- Edited by: Justine Wright
- Distributed by: Slinky Pictures
- Release date: 2006
- Running time: 15 minutes
- Language: English

Silence Is Golden is a 15-minute award-winning film written and directed by Chris Shepherd and produced by Maria Manton. Set in 1970s Britain, it tells the story of a 10-year-old boy's obsession with his seemingly simple-minded neighbour Dennis. The film mixes live action with various form of animation, including stop frame, drawn 2D. The complex mixture of styles enables Shepherd to show Billy's fantasies and inner thoughts on screen.

In 2006 the film won the TCM Classic Shorts Award at the London Film Festival. Industry stars celebrated the merits of the film, Terry Gilliam: "Terrific, strong, non-sentimental kid's story", Imelda Staunton "Wonderfully surreal", Stephen Poliakoff "Technically extremely impressive, full of wit and imagination" and Matthew Modine "A wonderful combination of mixed media, strong storytelling and talented actors." The film has continued to win awards and been screened internationally.

== Awards ==
=== 2014 ===
- Winner of Filmmaker Grand Prix at Sapporo International Short Film Festival, Japan

=== 2006 ===
- Winner of TCM Classic Shorts Award at 50th Times BFI London Film Festival, London, UK
- Winner of Audience Award at 25FPS International Film Festival, Zagreb, Croatia
- Winner of Special Mention, AFI FEST, Los Angeles, USA
- Winner of Best Narrative Short, Northampton International Film Festival. USA
- Winner of Grand Prix at Prague International Short Film Festival, Czech Republic
- Winner of Best Live Action Short at St Louis International Film Festival, USA

=== 2007 ===
- Winner of Best Screenplay at Mexico International Film Festival. Mexico
- Winner of Best Short Film at 3rd Digital Barcelona Film Festival, Spain
- Winner of Best Sound at Festival Pris de Courts, Paris, France
- Winner of Best Short Film at Rushes Soho Shorts Festival, London, UK

== DVD ==
Wholphin the DVD magazine have just released the film on their 6th edition. This is the first time the film has been released on DVD.

- July 2008 - Wholphin No.6, Silence Is Golden appears with director's interview as a part of a compilation. NTSC. All regions. ASIN: B000KF0DZC. UPC: 890353001041.

A Slinky Pictures production made in association with Autour de Minuit Productions with support from Arte France, Northwest Vision and UK Film Council Lottery Fund, Acardi.

== Sources ==
- http://www.silenceisgolden.info
- https://www.slinkypics.com
- bbc.co.uk
