= Mothers & Daughters (2004 film) =

- Directed by: David Conolly; Hannah Davis
- Written by: David Conolly; Hannah Davis
- Starring: Joan Blackham; Jean Boht; Hannah Davis; Miranda Hart; Simone Bowkett; Alix Longman; Caroline Burns Cooke; Joanna Pecover; David Conolly; Emma Stirland
- Music by: Carl Davis
- Release date: 2004
- Country: United Kingdom
- Language: English

Mothers & Daughters is a 2004 independent film written and directed by British duo Hannah Davis and David Conolly.

It is a story of Londoners connected by family, friends and a certain therapist who brings all her patients’ problems back to their mothers. Lives start to unravel during an eventful dinner party where the cook spoils the food, a coke-headed model flirts with a married vicar, a secret affair is exposed, old family wounds are reopened and one meddling mother drops by to cause even more trouble.

== Plot ==
Dinner party guests are forced to face their issues head on. For one couple, vicar Dan and his wife Emma are faced with the revelation that one of them has been having an affair with the evening's hostess Kate. Worst of all she has to in turn face her mother who drops in to "help out".

Even the therapist has to face her own maternal misgivings as she returns home to deal with the aftermath of her own mother's descent into Alzheimer's. Nina explores having to care for a sick mother who, when she was well, appeared not to care for either Nina or her sister.

== Cast ==
- Joan Blackham as Paddy, a mother who just can't help but meddle
- Jean Boht as Mary, a mother in a bit of a muddle
- Hannah Davis as Dolly, a daughter with schemes and dreams
- Miranda Hart as Kate, a daughter with a secret she longs to share
- Simone Bowkett as Sam, a daughter with an addiction
- Alix Longman as Lorraine, the therapist who brings everything down to the mother
- Caroline Burns Cooke as Nina, a daughter who cares for her mother
- Joanna Pecover as Emma, a daughter lost in motherhood
- David Conolly as Dan, a vicar with a wife, a daughter and one hell of a surprise on the way
- Emma Stirland as Ari, a daughter with her mother's boyfriend

== Production ==
David Conolly was in a show on London's West End that seemed to close on the first day of rehearsal. Conolly's unexpected unemployment meant a new ear to listen to the stories and a new eye for the structure of the screenplay.

Eight actors were chosen for the film (including Hannah Davis's mother Jean Boht) and six months were spent devising and rehearsing the script. This was followed by intense periods of filming with breaks so that the cast and crew could earn money to keep them going also giving time for Conolly and Davis to earn enough to finance the next phase of production. Producer and best-selling novelist Lynda La Plante (of Prime Suspect, Trial & Retribution and Commander fame) saw a teaser for the movie and offered to become part of the post-production team and sign on as executive producer.
