= Flappers Comedy Club =

Comedy club and restaurant in Burbank, California

- Interactive map of Flappers Comedy Club
- Location: 102 East Magnolia Boulevard, Burbank, California
- Type: Comedy club

Construction
- Opened: September 2008

Website
- http://flapperscomedy.com

Flappers Comedy Club and Restaurant is a live comedy club in Burbank. Notable celebrity comedians who have performed at Flappers have included Jerry Seinfeld, Maria Bamford, Kevin Hart, Gabriel Iglesias, Bill Burr, Dana Carvey, Adam Sandler, Christopher Titus, Jimmy Dore, Rob Schneider, and Craig Shoemaker.

The Burbank club, which opened in 2010, is located at 102 East Magnolia Boulevard in Downtown Burbank, and includes a 200-seat Mainroom, a smaller 50-seat "Yoo Hoo Room," and a bar & patio area with smaller performance stages. Each week, over 40 shows are produced. A full-service restaurant and bar menu is available before and during shows. Friday and Saturday 8pm and 10pm shows feature national touring headliners in the Mainroom. Other notable shows include:

- Celebrity Drop-In Tuesdays at 8pm – a show in which famous comedians routinely drop in, with past guests including Adam Sandler, Whitney Cummings, Adam DeVine
- Two Milk Minimum Saturdays at 4:30pm – a family-friendly comedy show starring Michael Rayner (Sesame Street)
- Uncle Clydes Comedy Contest every Wednesday at 8pm – Flappers' fresh-faces comedy contest in which the audience votes for their favorite comedians to win cash prizes, gift cards, and Flappers Traditional "Huge Bowl Of Fries."

Flappers is also home to Flappers University, "where learning is a joke," and is one of the largest comedy schools in Los Angeles. The school offers classes in stand-up comedy, improvisation, marketing and promoting, writing for late night television, screenwriting, getting booked on the road, and more.

== Events ==
Donovan Strain performing stand-up at Flappers Comedy Club in 2014

Since 2014, Flappers has continued to host the annual Burbank Comedy Festival, which features stand-up performances, industry panels, workshops, networking events, and after-parties at venues throughout Downtown Burbank. Past festival headliners have included Jay Leno, Jeff Garlin, Christina Pazsitzky, Tom Segura, Adam Carolla, and Phil Rosenthal.

In 2020, during the COVID-19 pandemic, Flappers temporarily suspended in-person performances and transitioned to virtual comedy shows, online classes, and the Flappcast webcast while also offering curbside food service.

== Acts ==
In winter of 2016, Cedric the Entertainer performed every Monday for a two-month residency. In April 2017, Kevin Hart headlined four shows.
