= Slinky Pictures =

- Founded: 2000; 26 years ago
- Founders: Maria Manton; Chris Shepherd
- Defunct: 2010
- Headquarters: London, England, United States

Slinky Pictures was a London based film and television production company. The company was created in 2000 by Maria Manton and Chris Shepherd and closed on its tenth anniversary in 2010. Its animation and hybrid output included commercials, short films, pop promos and television shows. Directors include: Chris Shepherd, Lucy Izzard, Suzanne Deakin, Emily Skinner, Leigh Hodgkinson, Andy Ward, Rebecca Manley, Laura Heit and Joe King.

Notable credits include animation for Fonejacker, Monkey Dust, Nathan Barley and U2, and films such as Dad's Dead, Who I Am And What I Want, Silence Is Golden, Moo(n), The Lucky Dip and its final film Bad Night for the Blues

== Sources ==
- http://www.slinkypics.com
