= Morgan Beck =

American beach volleyball player

Morgan Beck Miller

Personal information
- Nationality: American
- Born: Morgan Elizabeth Beck; March 30, 1987 (age 39); Newport Beach, California, U.S.
- Height: 191 cm (6 ft 3 in)
- Weight: 77 kg (170 lb)

Morgan (Beck) Miller (born March 30, 1987) is an American professional beach volleyball player and model.

She stands at 6 feet 3 inches tall. She was born in Newport Beach, California, and attended San Clemente High School in San Clemente, California where she made four records her senior year. These records included 39 kills in a game, 544 kills in a season, 11 service aces in a match and a .497 hitting percentage. She was named a Mizuno High School All-American. She graduated from the University of California, Berkeley, where she was a member of the volleyball team playing the positions of outside hitter and middle hitter. She was a member of the United States women's national volleyball team.

== Biography ==
As a professional, Beck plays for AVP Pro, USA Volleyball and AVP Young Guns.

She is also a model and was named by Complex Magazine "One of the 25 Hottest Athletes on the 2012 U.S. Olympic Team". In 2010, she was featured in a Nike ad campaign.

She married Olympic skiing champion Bode Miller on October 7, 2012, after five months of dating. They have a son, Nash Skan Miller, born in 2015. Their daughter, Emeline "Emmy" Grier Miller (November 5, 2016 – June 10, 2018) drowned at 19 months old in the swimming pool of a neighbor's home in Orange County, California. Following her daughter's death, she voiced support of parental blogger Nichole Hughes, who lost her 3-year-old son to drowning around the same time as Miller, in raising awareness of childhood drowning, the number-one cause of death for children between the ages of 1 and 4. Their second son, Easton Vaughn Rek Miller, was born on October 5, 2018. On November 8, 2019, they welcomed twin boys Asher and Axel Miller. Beck is also stepmother to Miller's two other children, Dace and Samuel Miller-McKenna. In May 2021, Beck announced that she was pregnant with a girl, due in November 2021. The daughter was born on November 26, 2021.
