= Maria Manton =

French painter

- Born: December 4, 1910; Blida, French Algeria
- Died: September 2, 2003 (aged 92); Paris, France
- Known for: Painting
- Movement: School of Paris
- Spouse: Louis Nallard (m. 1944)

Maria Manton (1910–2003) was a French painter.

== Biography ==
Maria Manton was born on 4 December 1910 in Blida, Algeria. During the German occupation of Alsace in 1870, her maternal grandparents came to settle in the outskirts of the city. A native of Tarbes, her father had a military career and for about ten years the family followed his travels before settling in Algiers. At the end of her secondary studies, during which she was passionate about Egyptology, Maria Manton fell ill for more than a year, which forced her to give up starting higher education and she began to draw. She attended drawing classes and then the painting studio of the School of Fine Arts in Algiers from 1936 to 1942. There, in 1941 she met Louis Nallard, whom she married in 1944. She also met Marcel Bouqueton and Sauveur Galliéro, with whom she exhibited in 1942, and Robert Martin, who later directed the avant-garde gallery Colline in Oran, then the painter Georges Ladrey. In 1946 she made her first solo exhibition and participated in the “Ecole de Paris” exhibition organized by Gaston Diehl.

== Personal exhibitions ==
- 1950 - Paris, Colette Allendy Gallery; Amsterdam, Le Canard Gallery
- 1952 - Paris, Arnaud Gallery; Antwerp, Kunst Kabinet Horemans
- 1953 - Lyon, gallery Grange; Algiers, gallery Rivages (Edmond Charlot)
- 1954 - Paris, gallery Arnaud
- 1956 - Paris, gallery The Wheel
- 1957 - Paris, Arnaud Gallery; Schiedam (Netherlands), CCC Gallery
- 1961 - Paris, gallery The Wheel
- 1962 - Lausanne, gallery of the Grand Chêne
- 1965 - Paris, gallery La Roue
- 1968 - Paris, workshop Le Bret
- 1969 - Budapest, Hungarian Center for Cultural Relations
- 1972 - Maillot-Sens, summer festival
- 1975 - Paris, Atelier Moissinac
- 1980 - Toulouse, gallery P.-J. Meurisse
- 1983 - Paris, Jacques Massol Gallery; Toulouse, gallery Génélis
- 1985 - Paris, gallery Callu Mérite
- 1987 - Paris, gallery Callu Merit
- 1989 - Paris, Algerian Cultural Center (with Louis Nallard)
- 1990 - Paris, "Abstracts from 1948 to 1954", gallery Callu Merite; Évreux, "40 Years of Painting", Maison des arts; Paris, "Works on paper", gallery Debaigts; Amsterdam, gallery M. de Boer (Maria Manton and Louis Nallard)
- 1992 - Paris, "46 years of painting, 1946-1992", gallery Callu Merit
- 2000 - Paris, gallery Nicolas Deman
- 2014 - Paris gallery Artemper (Maria Manton and Louis Nallard)
- 2015 - Paris, Buci Gallery (Maria Manton and Louis Nallard)
