= Chris Shepherd =

British animator, writer, and director

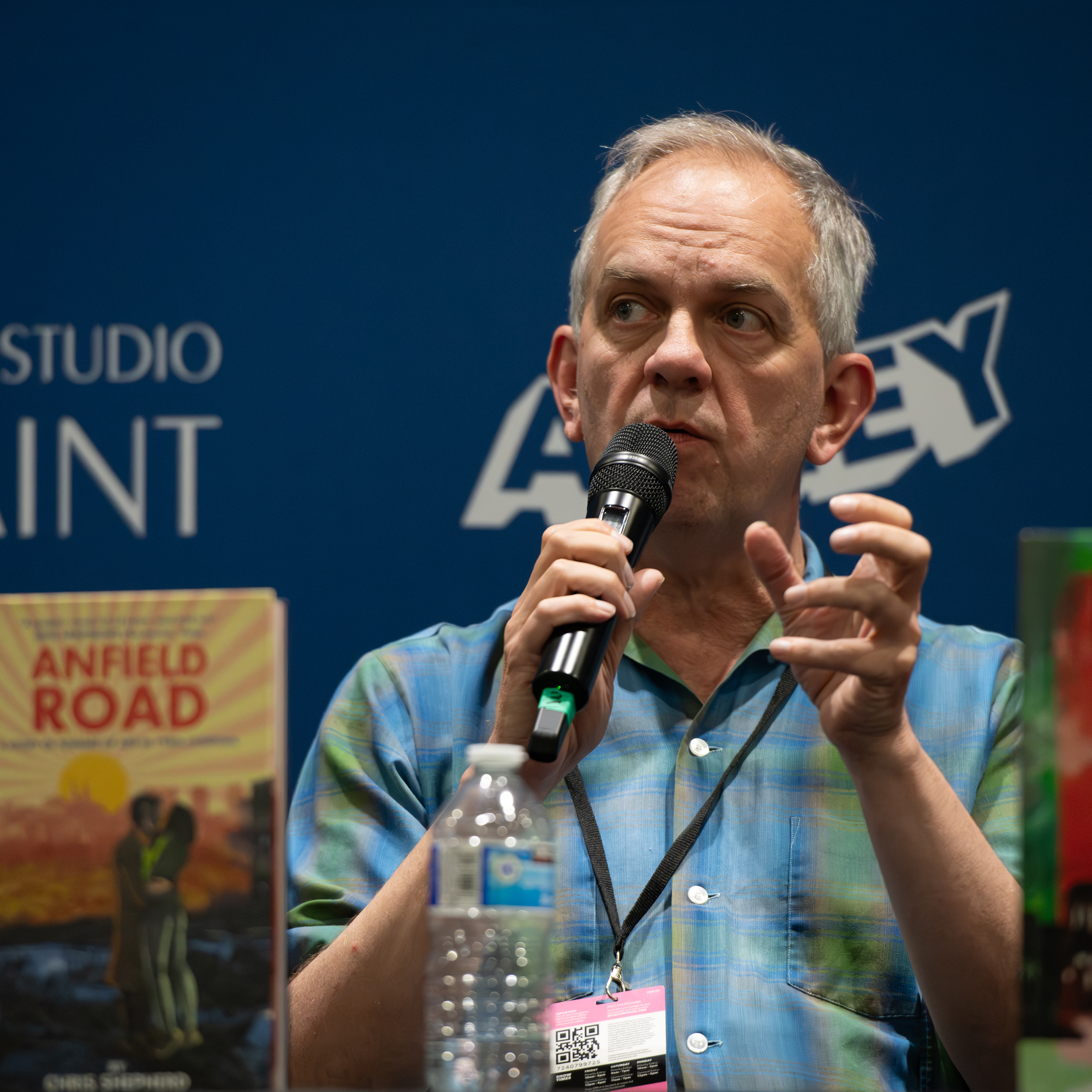
- At MCM Comic Con London, May 2025
- Born: 11 December 1967 (age 58); Anfield, Liverpool, England
- Occupations: Director, writer, producer
- Awards: Winner of a British Independent Film Award and five British Animation Awards
- Website: chrisshepherdfilms.com

Chris Shepherd (born 11 December 1967) is a double BAFTA nominated British television/film writer, graphic novelist and director. Born in Anfield, Liverpool in 1967, he is known for combining live action with animation. His work fuses comedy with commentary on the darker side of human nature.

== Early years ==
Shepherd's first animation was made in 1989 and it was called Safari. He wanted to make a drama but didn't know any actors, so he made his cast out of plasticine. Using this film he won a place at University for the Creative Arts, Farnham. His first job in the industry was as production manager at Speedy Films which was the creative vehicle for director Paul Vester. His writing and commissioned directorial debut came in 1997 with a Channel 4 film called The Broken Jaw. This animated comedy illustrated the plight of a public house after it has been transformed into a fun pub. During the same year he animated the world stare-out championship for BBC comedy sketch show Big Train.

As well as being the producer on the Channel 4/MOMI scheme, he also worked as producer with Cramp Twins creator, Brian Wood, on his Channel 4 film School Disco and "Bunny Schendler" on her BAFTA nominated "World of Interiors".

== Slinky ==
In 2000, Shepherd set up Slinky Pictures and until its closure in 2010, the company produced many award-winning films and adverts. His 2003 Dad's Dead, commissioned by animate!, featured Ian Hart as its narrator. This was the first of many collaborations with producer and Slinky Pictures co-founder Maria Manton. The film won 25 international awards including Best Short Film at the British Independent Film Awards and BAFTA nomination. He directed and co-wrote a spoof general election series with Peter Holmes called People's Britain for Channel 4 in 2001.

Other credits include animation on Channel 4 sitcom Nathan Barley and Channel 4 documentary Bollocks to Cancer. 2005 saw him co-write and co-direct with artist David Shrigley on a second animate! commission called Who I Am And What I Want. The year after Silence Is Golden won the TCM Classic Shorts Award at the 2006 London Film Festival.

It was during this period that Shepherd wrote several feature films including: Up in Heaven, Directed by Shepherd, produced by Nira Park and Maria Manton for Film4, Big Talk Productions; and 50% Off, directed by Shepherd from an idea by him and David Shrigley for Warp Films. His last Slinky film, Bad Night for the Blues, won the International Canal+ Award at Clermont-Ferrand International Short Film Festival and was transmitted on BBC HD on 27 February 2011.

== Post Slinky and Random Acts 2011 to 2016 ==
Shepherd's first work after Slinky was a pop promo, Falling into Pieces, for Black Casino and the Ghost. From 2011 saw Shepherd being a guest curator on Channel 4's late night arts strand Random Acts. Commissioned by Lupus films he's worked with the likes of David Shrigley, Phil Mulloy and Fred Deakin. As well as curating and producing sixty films for the strand he's also directed two. A recreation of a childhood visits to the dentist called "Drillerfiller" and a pop promo for protest singer Grace Petrie called "Grace Petrie: Rise". Both look at Shepherd's childhood landscape, the first as a memory and the second as a documentary. "Rise" was shot in Anfield, Liverpool just as Shepherd's childhood neighbourhood was being demolished. The film was later included in 2012's Anfield Home Tours as part of the 2up2down project. He also produced a documentary project with Tim Brunsden called Home Sweet Home which documented events after a major fire at Shepherd's family home.

In 2013 he wrote and directed a new film called The Ringer, which saw Shepherd develop his autobiographical approach to filmmaking. Shepherd revealed in 2018 that the film was inspired by his estranged father, Andy Fletcher. He created the film as both an examination of the events and a tribute to his father. Fletcher died on 19 September 2018.

2013 saw Shepherd collaborate with Robert Popper on Anatole's Island, which was voiced by Peter Serafinowicz. Shepherd directed a series of Comedy Blaps! for Channel 4 with the comedy collective the Alternative Comedy Memorial Society. Pop promo collaborations followed with the likes of Holly Johnson, Kurt Wagner, Reverend and The Makers, Lambchop members new electronic band HeCTA and The Wave Pictures.

2016 saw Shepherd return with another director/writer project for Arte called Johnno's Dead, a loose sequel to his 2003 classic. This sequel is set thirteen years after the original was set and starts the same cast. The film has played many international festivals such as Annecy, Clermont Ferrand, Tampere and the film picked up Best British Short Film at the London International Animation Festival held in the Barbican in London.

== Joe Orton ==
In 2017, Shepherd embarked upon a Joe Orton tribute project to mark the 50th anniversary of the death of the playwright. The project was masterminded by Shepherd with Emma Parker from the University of Leicester. It centres around Orton's Edna Welthorpe letters. Orton wrote prank letters of complaint to poke fun at establishment figures such as vicars, companies and sometimes even his own plays. The project funded by the Arts Council England and the University of Leicester has seen many comedy writers such as Alec Baldwin, David Quantick, Caroline Moran, Phil Bowker, Arthur Mathews, Jesse Armstrong write new Edna Welthorpe letters. These letters are to be read in two events. The first in Latitude with readings by Robin Ince, John-Luke Roberts and Joe Orton's sister, Leonine Orton-Barnet. The second is at the Little Theatre in Orton's hometown on the anniversary of Orton's death on 9 August 2017. With readings by Leonie Orton-Barnet, Frances Barber, David Quantick and John Shuttleworth. In addition, Shepherd directed a short animated film called Yours Faithfully Edna Welthorpe (Mrs), which featured the voices of Alison Steadman and Robin Sebastian.

== 2010s Filmwork ==
Shepherd directed a short film for Arte France with regular collaborators Autour De Minuit called Brexicuted which premiered in Edinburgh Film Festival on 27 June 2018. In 2020, he created animations for Sara Pascoe's sitcom with illustrator Stephen Collins for BBC 2 called Out Of Her Mind.

== Anfield Road ==
Shepherd's debut graphic novel, Anfield Road, was published, through Titan Comics, on 29 October 2024. It was described as "full of heart, soul and wit" by screenwriter and producer Jesse Armstrong. It depicts a beautiful coming-of-age story, centred around growing up in the working-class dynamics of Merseyside, in the late 1980s. Upon release in October The Observer's Rachel Cooke made it graphic novel of the month.

== Filmography ==
2023	BC Camplight-The Last Rotation Of Earth	director lyric video	
2020	Out Of Her Mind	Animator	
2019	Reverend and the Makers-Elastic Fantastic	director and writer	
2018	Brexicuted	directed and writer	Winner Best Animated Film UK Film Review Awards 2018, Winner Mock Award Rising Of Lusitania AnimaDoc Festival 2020.
2017	Yours Faithfully Edna Welthorpe (Mrs)	directed and adapted from Joe Orton	Winner Wildcard Award Saboteur Awards 2017
2016	Johnno's Dead	director and writer	Winner Best British Short London Int Animation Festival 2017
2016	The Wave Pictures-Pool Hall	director and writer	
2016	The Wave Pictures-The Running Man	director and writer	
2015	Reverend and the Makers – Making Babies from Mirrors	co-animation director with Joice Jurtiz and writer	
2015	HeCTA featuring Kurt Wagner – Sympathy for the Auto Industry	co-director with Jez Pennington and writer	
2015	HeCTA featuring Kurt Wagner and Buddy Hackett – The Concept	director and writer	
2014	Holly Johnson – In And Out of Love	director and writer	
2013	Comedy Blaps: The Alternative Comedy Memorial Society Presents a Board Meeting	director	
2013	The Ringer	director and writer	WinnerPublic Choice Award Nice Int Film Festival 2014, Winner Filmmaker Grand Prix Sapporo Short Film Festival 2014
2013	Life Class	director and writer	
2013	Shameless – episode 10.2	animator	
2013	Anatole's Island	co-director with Amer Nazri	
2012	Home Sweet Home (documentary)	producer (directed by Tim Brunsden)	
2012	Grace Petrie – Rise	co director and writer with Rod Main	
2012	Drillerfiller	director and writer	
2011	Black Casino and the Ghost – Falling into Pieces	director and writer	
2010	Bad Night for the Blues	director and writer	Winner Canal+ Award Clermont Ferrand Int Film Fest 2011
2010	Count Arthur Strong's Entertainment Game (TV pilot)	animation	
2010	The Klang Show	animation	
2007	Granny	director and writer	
2006	Silence is Golden	director and writer	Winner TCM Film Award, BFI London Film Festival 2007
2005	Who I Am And What I Want	co-director and co-writer with David Shrigley	Nominated Best British Short at British Independent Film Awards 2006. Winner Public Choice Award British Animation Award 2006, Tiger Award Rotterdam In Film Festival 2006
2005	Nathan Barley	animation and graphics	
2005	Only Human: Bollocks to Cancer	animation	
2003	Dad's Dead	director and writer	Nominated Best Short Animation at BAFTA Film Awards 2004, Winner Best Short Film at British Independent Film Awards 2003, Winner 2 British Animation Awards 2004
2001	People's Britain	director and co-writer with Peter Holmes	Winner Best Comedy Series British Animation Awards 2002
2001	The World of Interiors	producer	Nominated Best Animated Films BAFTA Film Awards 2002
2000	Pop Skool	director	
2000	Angry Kid Episode: "Backward Writing"	co-writer with Darren Walsh	
1999	School Disco	producer	
1998	Big Train (Series 1)	animation	Winner Best Broken Comedy British Comedy Awards 1999
1997	The Broken Jaw	director and writer	
1995	Abductees	production manager	
1992	A Load of Balls	director and writer	
1989	Safari	director and writer	
