= Jungle Island =

Zoo on Watson Island near downtown Miami, Florida

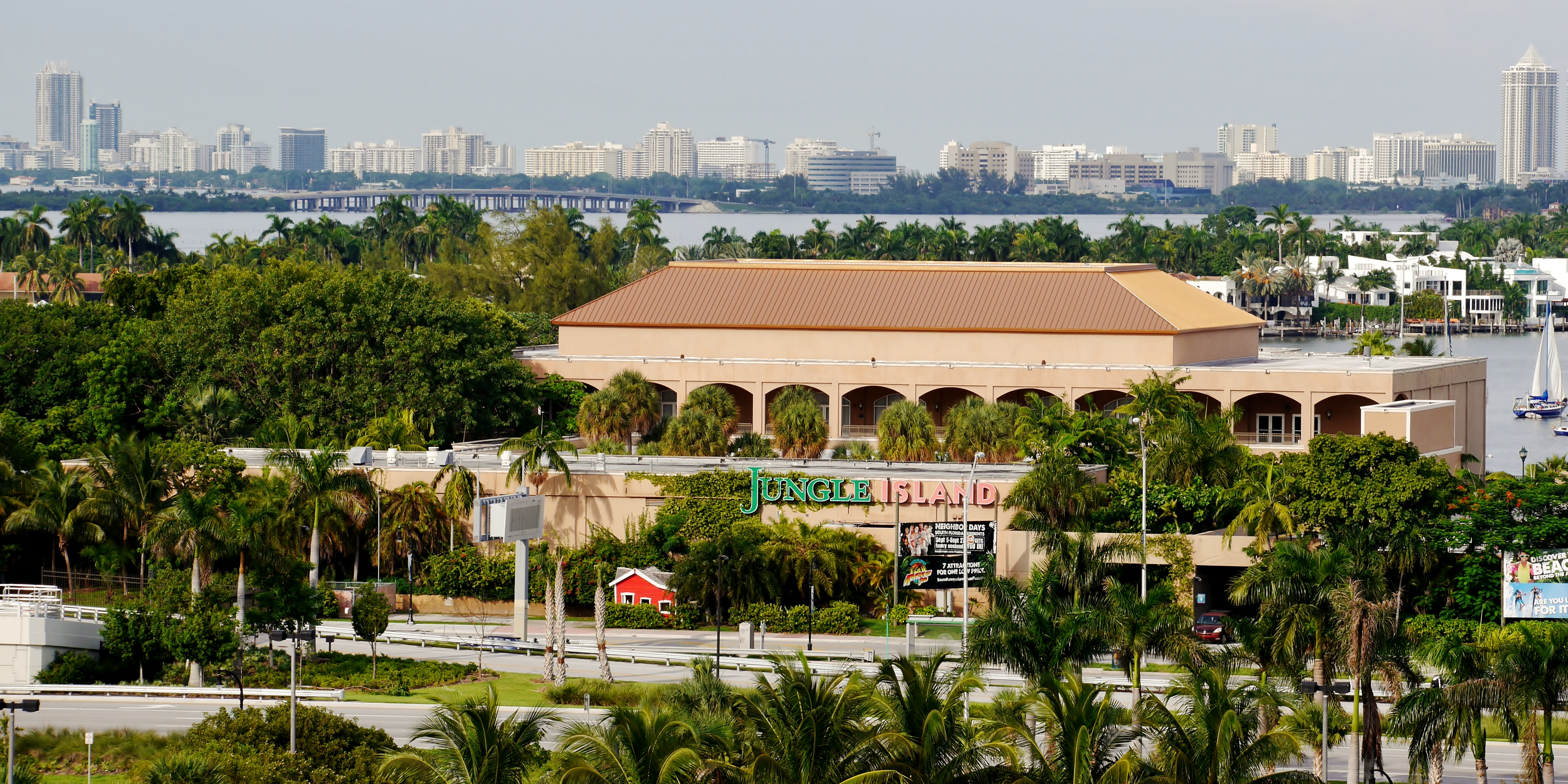
- Jungle Island along the MacArthur Causeway
- Interactive map of Jungle Island
- 25°47′10″N 80°10′27″W
- Date opened: December 20, 1936; 89 years ago (as Parrot Jungle); June 28, 2003; 23 years ago (at current location)
- Location: Miami, Florida
- Website: www.jungleisland.com

Jungle Island, formerly Parrot Jungle, is a relaunched eco-adventure park on Watson Island, Miami, Florida, United States. The park re-opened following a series of major renovations after the park incurred damage from Hurricane Irma. The park features new pop-up waterslides, an outdoor wind tunnel flight experience, zip lines, escape rooms, a Nerf battle stadium and other attractions.

Originally named Parrot Jungle, it was moved from its original suburban location in Pinecrest, Florida to its present location just east of downtown Miami after the previous site was purchased for Pinecrest Gardens in 2002. It was renamed as Parrot Jungle Island. In 2007, the park was again renamed, to Jungle Island.

== History ==
Parrot Jungle was a zoological park south of Miami on 20 acres (8.1 ha) of property at Killian Drive and South Red Road.

Founded in 1936 by Francis "Franz" & Louise Scherr, Parrot Jungle is one of the oldest tourist attractions established in the Miami area. Scherr would often visit another attraction, Monkey Jungle, owned by Joe Drummond. On one visit when Scherr was again making one of his many suggestions for improvement, Drummond became fed up and told him, "Go start your own jungle." Scherr, who owned and operated a feed and supply store in Homestead, became intrigued with the idea of building an attraction where birds would "fly free". Scherr leased 20 acres (81,000 m^{2}) of hammock land for US$25 (equivalent to about $580 in 2025). The site was previously a naturist resort. Parrot Jungle was built as a winding nature trail dug through the coral rock and hammock land, indigenous to the area. All the natural plants were left undisturbed, and the entrance was built on Red Road.

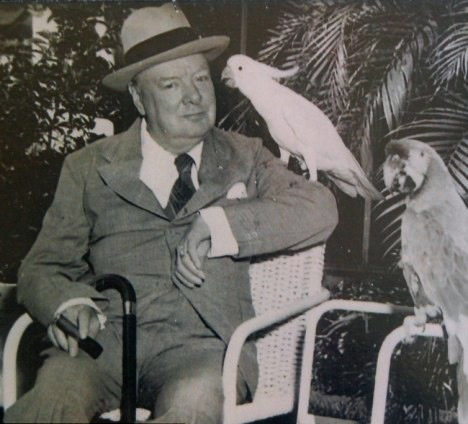
Sir Winston Churchill with a sulphur crested cockatoo and a military macaw at Miami's Parrot Jungle in 1946.

The attraction opened on December 20, 1936, to about 100 visitors. Each person paid 25 cents to see and hear Scherr talk about his birds, trees and flowers. Since 1936, over a million visitors have visited Parrot Jungle. Among its many famous visitors were Sir Winston Churchill, film director Steven Spielberg, and former US President Jimmy Carter.

In 1988 Bern Levine purchased Parrot Jungle from the Scherr family. On December 17, 2002, the Village of Pinecrest purchased the Parrot Jungle site with the aim of developing the site as Pinecrest Gardens. On March 8, 2003 Pinecrest Gardens opened as a municipal park. The original site was added to the National Register of Historic Places in 2011 as the Parrot Jungle Historic District. The actual attraction moved to a new waterfront location on Watson Island, between downtown Miami and South Beach. It opened on June 28, 2003 as Parrot Jungle Island. Until 2004 exotic birds were sold. On June 28, 2007, four years after the park first opened at its bayfront location, Jungle Island became the official name.

== Features ==
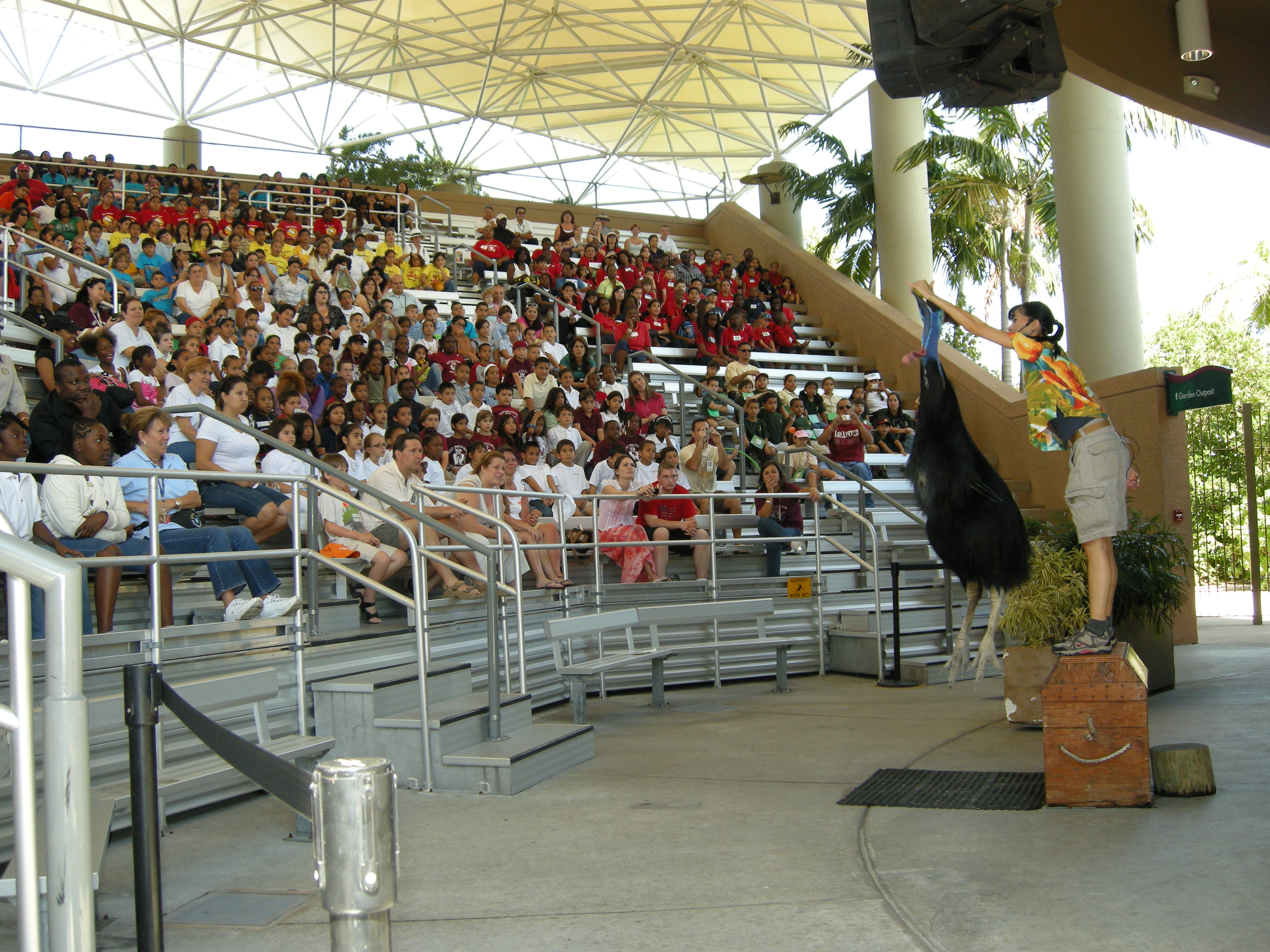
Mama Cass, a southern cassowary, jumps in the air for an apple, which she swallows whole, in front of an audience.

As of 2003 there were 1,000 varieties of parrots among the 3,000 animals at Parrot Jungle Island. The theme park's landmark is the sails covering the Jungle Theater, an arena where "Tale of the Tiger", featuring large cats and wildlife and other shows are presented. Hercules, a 900-pound liger, a cross between a lion and a tiger, is housed near the Jungle Theater. In the Parrot Bowl, the "Winged Wonders" show highlights birds from around the world, including the Andean condor, cassowary (the only trained cassowary in the world), and king vulture. In the "Serpentarium" (named in honor of Bill Haast's famed Miami Serpentarium), a wide spectrum of animals are presented from African penguins to alligator snapping turtles, boa constrictor snakes to lemurs.

Various other animal feedings, keeper talks and casual presentations occur throughout the park daily. There is a petting zoo where visitors can interact with a number of domestic and exotic animals, including an experience with red kangaroos. The park's "Everglades Habitat" recreates the ecosystem of the Florida Everglades, featuring much of the natural flora and fauna found in the natural environment. A $20 million redesign with zip lines, swimming facilities and other new attractions and restaurants was planned for late 2017.

== Parrot Cove Beach ==
Jungle Island opened up a water park for guests with a view of downtown Miami. The water park features several obstacle courses, riptide rapids, slides, and a climbing wall. During summer months, the park offers their "Summer Savings Ticket," granting entry into both the main park and the water park. Occupancy of the water park is usually restricted to 60 people at a time, with a duration of one to two hours. The section of the beach is privately owned by Jungle Island and is currently closed due to Hurricane Irma.

== Environmental efforts ==
The landscaping for the new 18 acre (7.3 ha) site was begun in 2000 with a four foot elevation change. The four year site development was designed to be environmentally sustainable, minimizing the use of fertilizers and pesticides. In well-traveled areas, vegetation was planted that stays healthy, green and stable despite heavy foot traffic, without the use of fertilizers, pesticides and fungicides. Jungle Island also uses an integrated pest management system which employs biological controls, reducing the need for pesticides.

Jungle Island has taken on a role in the greater Miami and the beaches environmental movement. Jungle Island purchased carbon credits to offset a special event. Jungle Island also hosts environmental conferences and events including Gateway To Green, Energy Smart Florida, and Earth Miami. Some of the proceeds from the Earth Miami event were to be donated to the Everglades Foundation.

== Gallery ==
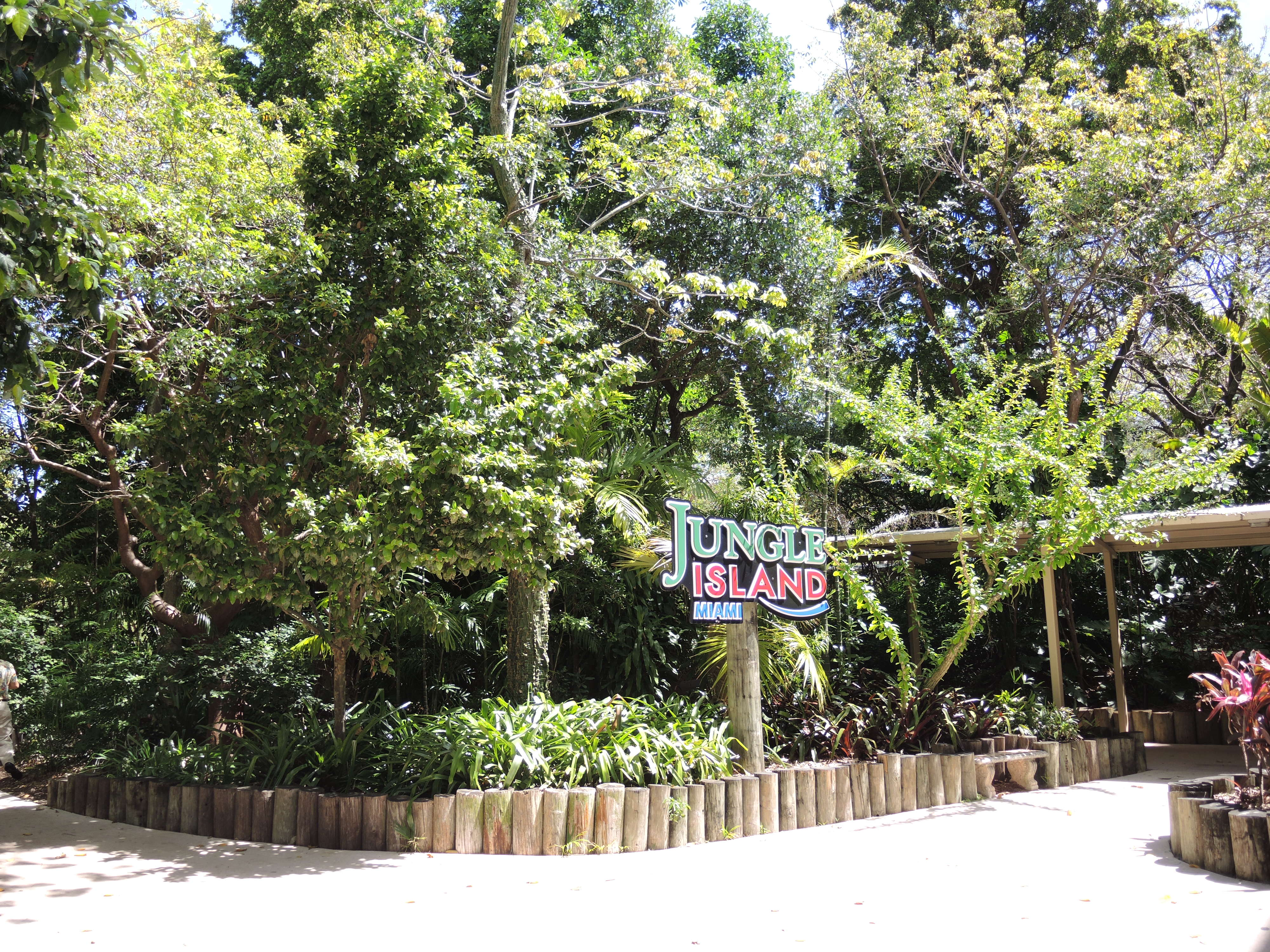
Main Entrance.

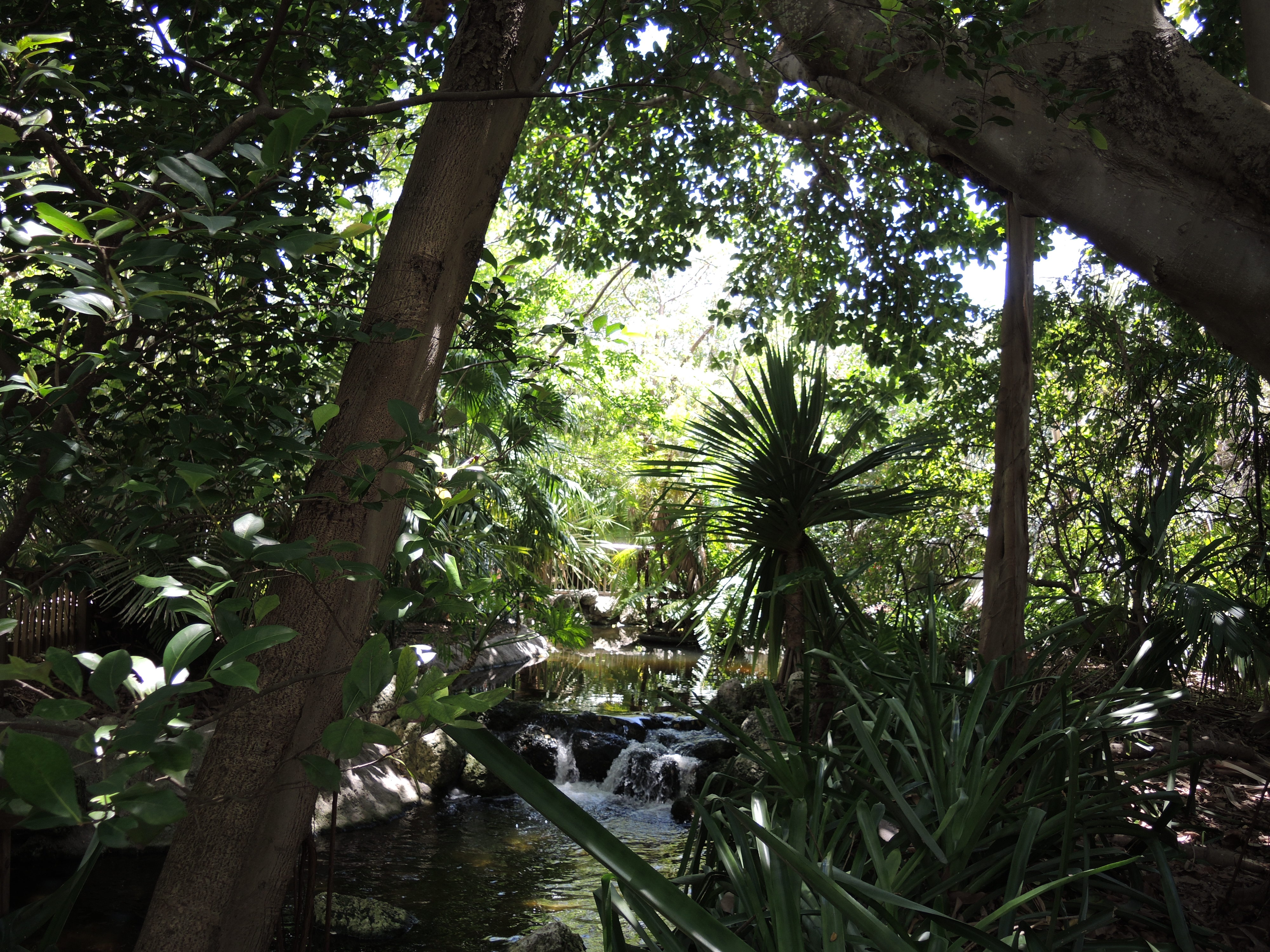
The Everglades Habitat exhibit.

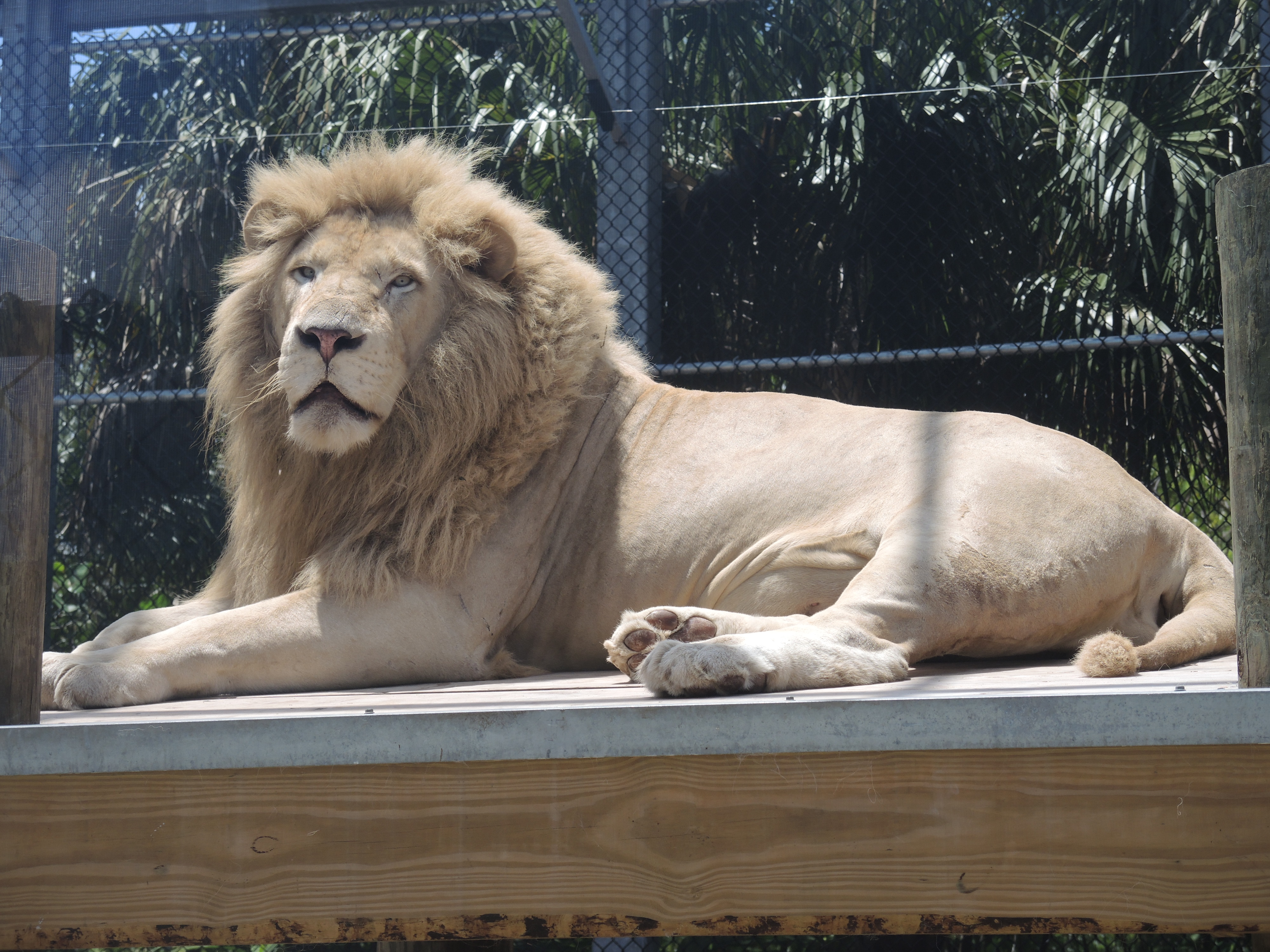
Part of the lion habitat.

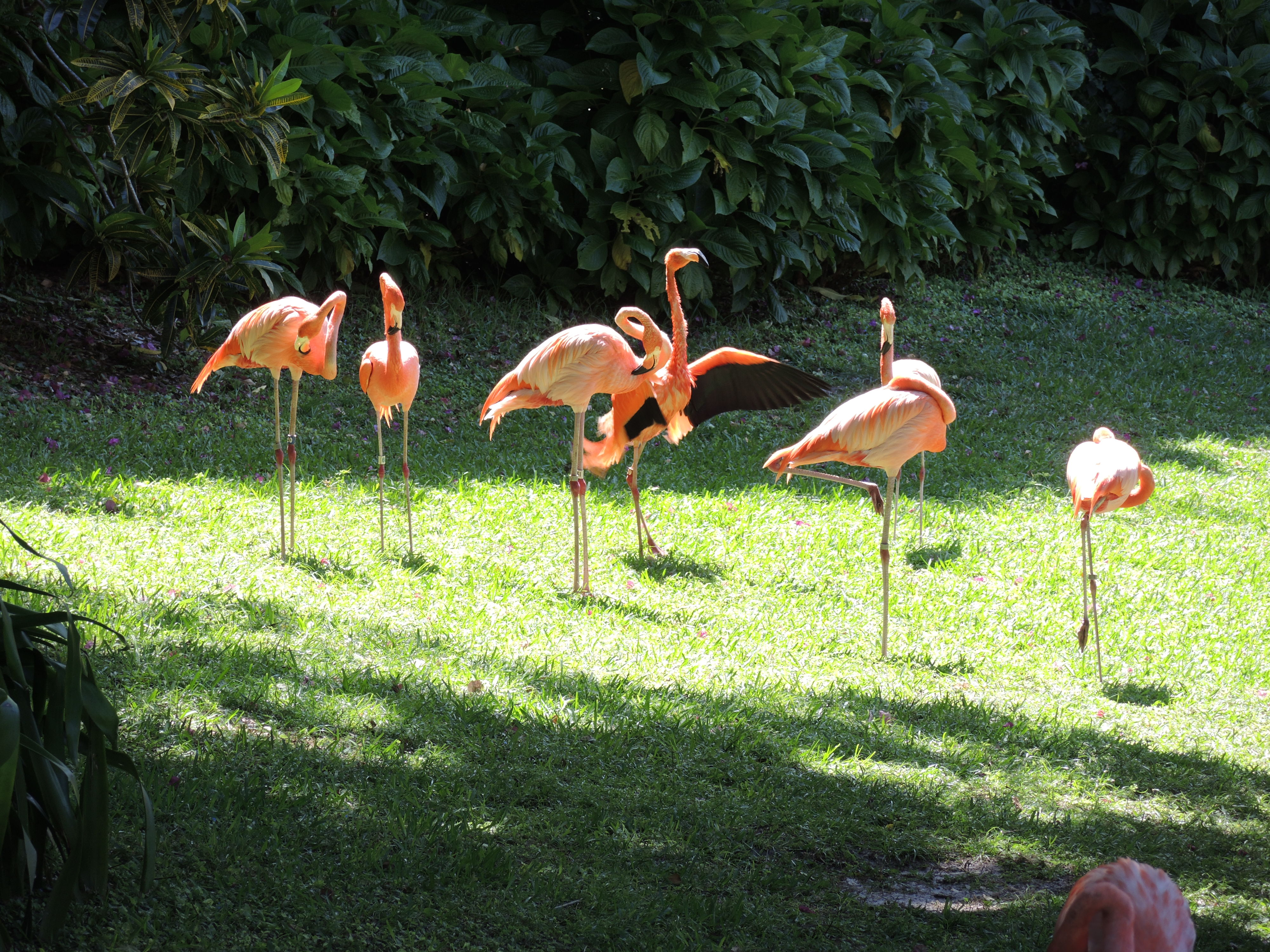
Pink Flamingos habitat.

Common squirrel monkey. (Video)
