= Pinecrest, Florida =

Village in Miami-Dade County, Florida

- Village
- Village of Pinecrest
- Logo

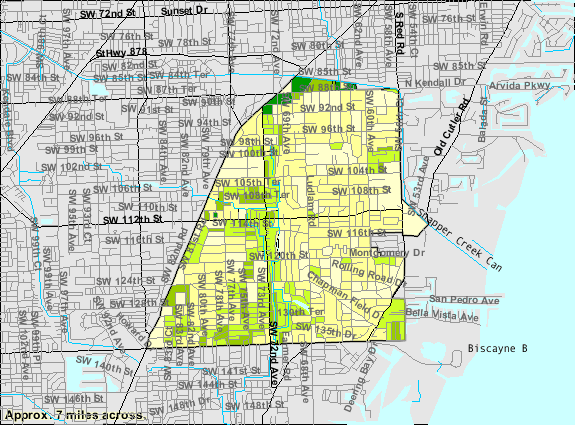
- U.S. Census Bureau map showing village boundaries
- Coordinates: 25°39′54″N 80°18′15″W
- Country: United States
- State: Florida
- County: Miami-Dade
- Incorporated: March 12, 1996

Government
  - Type: Council-Manager

Area
  - Total: 7.54 sq mi (19.52 km^{2})
  - Land: 7.45 sq mi (19.30 km^{2})
  - Water: 0.089 sq mi (0.23 km^{2}) 0.13%
- Elevation: 7 ft (2.1 m)

Population (2020)
  - Total: 18,388
  - Density: 2,467.9/sq mi (952.88/km^{2})
- Time zone: UTC-5 (EST)
  - Summer (DST): UTC-4 (EDT)
- ZIP Code: 33156
- Area codes: 305, 786, 645
- FIPS code: 12-56625
- GNIS feature ID: 2407522
- Website: pinecrest-fl.gov

Pinecrest is a suburban village in Miami-Dade County, Florida, United States. The village is part of the Miami metropolitan area of South Florida. As of the 2020 census, the population was 18,388.

Pinecrest is governed by a five-member village council and operates under the council-manager form of government. 33156, the ZIP code that encompasses most of the village, has been consistently ranked as one of the wealthiest in the United States by income. Based on the median home listing price in recent years at $4,300,000, Pinecrest has been ranked as one of the most expensive cities in Florida to purchase a home in.

== History ==
During the 1900s, Miami pioneer and railroad tycoon Henry Flagler used the property at U.S. 1 and Southwest 102 Street as a staging area during the construction of the Overseas Railroad to the Florida Keys.

In the 1930s, the area's growth continued and the community began to evolve around one of the first tourist attractions established in the Miami vicinity – Parrot Jungle and Gardens. Parrot Jungle was founded in 1936 by Franz and Louise Scherr on property located at Red Road and Southwest 111 Street and over the years has become a tourist attraction whose visitors included Winston Churchill. The idea for Parrot Jungle began after Scherr, who owned and operated a feed and supply store in Homestead, and became intrigued with the idea of building an attraction where birds would "fly free". To bring his vision to life, he rented 20 acres (8.1 ha) of hammock land for an annual fee of $25 (equivalent to $476.92 in 2021). Parrot Jungle was built as a winding nature trail dug through the coral rock and hammock land, indigenous to the area. All the natural plants were left undisturbed. The entrance was built on Red Road. The attraction opened on December 20, 1936, to about 100 visitors. Each paid 25 cents admission to see and hear Scherr talk about his birds, trees and flowers. Since 1936, Parrot Jungle has attracted over a million visitors. On December 17, 2002, the Village of Pinecrest purchased the Parrot Jungle with the aim of developing the site as Pinecrest Gardens. On March 8, 2003, the Pinecrest Village Council dedicated Pinecrest Gardens and officially opened it to the public as the village's newest municipal park. The attraction moved to a new waterfront location on Watson Island between downtown Miami and Miami Beach. It was relaunched as Parrot Jungle Island.

The Miami Serpentarium, a tourist attraction that featured snakes, lizards and other reptiles and amphibians, was located on US 1 for many decades prior to closing in the mid-1980s.

During the 1950s and 1960s, the area flourished with the development and construction of ranch-style houses on 1-acre (0.40 ha) lots which laid the foundation for the community's rural and lushly landscaped residential character.

While still an unincorporated area of Miami-Dade County, what is now Pinecrest was the site of the 1986 FBI Miami shootout. The shootout took place near 12201 Southwest 82nd Avenue.

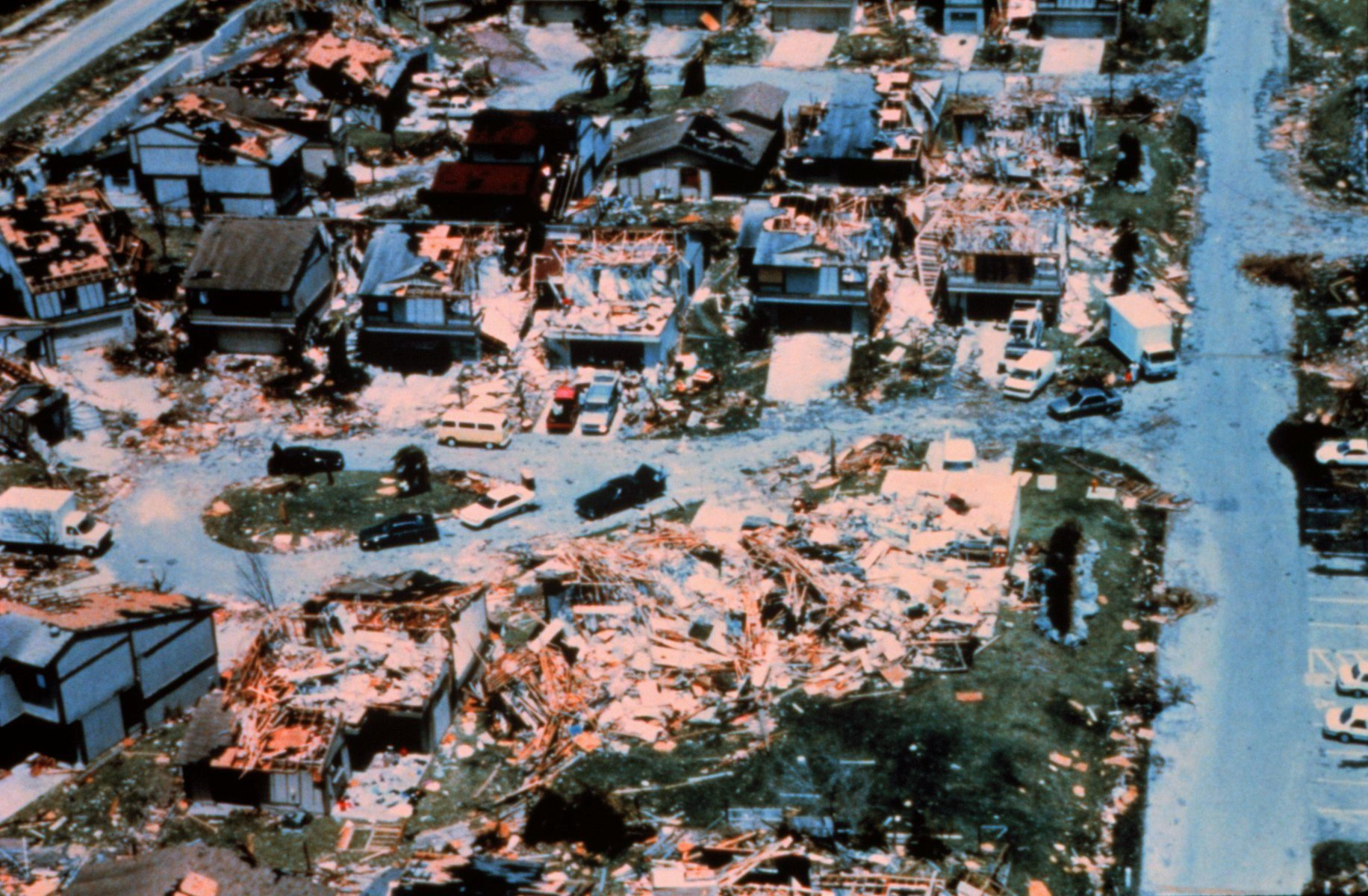
Damage from Hurricane Andrew in 1992 in the area

In August 1992, Pinecrest and the surrounding South Miami-Dade area were devastated by the effects of Hurricane Andrew. Many of the homes and businesses in the area were destroyed. In the subsequent years, the area was slowly rebuilt.

Rapid growth and local issues during the 1990s inspired a movement led by residents Evelyn Greer Langlieb and Gary C. Matzner to incorporate the area. The Village of Pinecrest was officially incorporated on March 12, 1996. Evelyn Greer was elected the first mayor and was succeeded, after serving two terms, by Matzner in 2004. The founding village council, including Greer, Cindie Blanck, Barry Blaxberg, Leslie Bowe, Robert Hingston, together with Village Manager Peter G. Lombardi and Village Clerk Guido Inguanzo, are credited with establishing well-regarded municipal services including police, parks and recreation, building and planning services, and public works.

== Geography ==
Pinecrest is located 11 miles (18 km) southwest of downtown Miami. U.S. Route 1 (Pinecrest Parkway) forms the western border of the village. Neighboring communities are Coral Gables to the east, South Miami to the north, Glenvar Heights to the northwest, Kendall to the west, and Palmetto Bay to the south.

According to the U.S. Census Bureau, the village has a total area of 7.54 square miles (19.5 km^{2}), of which 7.45 square miles (19.3 km^{2}) are land and 0.09 square miles (0.23 km^{2}), or 1.15%, are water.

== Demographics ==
Historical population
Census	Pop.	Note	%±
2000	19,055		—
2010	18,223		−4.4%
2020	18,388		0.9%
U.S. Decennial Census

=== 2020 census ===
Pinecrest racial composition (Hispanics excluded from racial categories) (NH = Non-Hispanic)
Race	Number	Percentage
White (NH)	7,266	39.51%
Black or African American (NH)	322	1.75%
Native American or Alaska Native (NH)	3	0.02%
Asian (NH)	942	5.12%
Pacific Islander or Native Hawaiian (NH)	4	0.02%
Some other race (NH)	121	0.66%
Two or more races/Multiracial (NH)	622	3.38%
Hispanic or Latino (any race)	9,108	49.53%
Total	18,388	

As of the 2020 census, Pinecrest had a population of 18,388. The median age was 44.1 years. 23.4% of residents were under the age of 18 and 17.7% of residents were 65 years of age or older. For every 100 females there were 93.7 males, and for every 100 females age 18 and over there were 92.1 males age 18 and over.

100.0% of residents lived in urban areas, while 0.0% lived in rural areas.

There were 6,232 households in Pinecrest, of which 38.7% had children under the age of 18 living in them. Of all households, 66.3% were married-couple households, 10.7% were households with a male householder and no spouse or partner present, and 19.3% were households with a female householder and no spouse or partner present. About 16.1% of all households were made up of individuals and 7.7% had someone living alone who was 65 years of age or older.

There were 6,668 housing units, of which 6.5% were vacant. The homeowner vacancy rate was 2.1% and the rental vacancy rate was 7.8%.

=== Demographic estimates ===
According to the 2020 ACS 5-year estimates, there were 4,824 families residing in the village.

4.8% of the population were under 5 years old, and 46.3% of the population were female.

29.7% of the population were foreign-born persons. There were 425 veterans living in the village.

=== Income and poverty ===
The median household income was $166,801. 7.7% of the population lived below the poverty threshold. 97.9% of households had a computer, and 95.6% of households had a broadband internet subscription.

== Government and infrastructure ==
Miami-Dade Fire Rescue operates Station 49 Pinecrest.

=== Community projects ===
Pinecrest's projects since 1996 include the addition of several new parks, development of Wi-Fi technology and beautification projects which included thousands of trees being planted, unique street signs being posted village-wide, and roads being repaved. By planting over 10,000 street trees since 1997, Pinecrest was named a Tree City USA community by the Arbor Day Foundation.

In 2008, the village council dedicated the new Flagler Grove Park and the long-awaited community center at Pinecrest Gardens. The Pinecrest branch of the Miami-Dade County Library System opened adjacent to the community center in October 2008.

=== Parks ===
There are five public parks managed by the Pinecrest Parks and Recreation Department:

- Coral Pine Park — A 9-acre (3.6 ha) park with a recreation center, six lighted tennis courts, a natural area, an all-purpose field and a tot lot. Coral Pine Park was a former Miami-Dade County park before being transferred to Pinecrest in 1998.
- Flagler Grove Park — A 3-acre (1.2 ha) facility with lighted youth soccer fields, a playground, parking and restrooms. As mentioned above, the park was dedicated in 2008.
- Evelyn Greer Park — A 10-acre (4.0 ha) park with multipurpose athletic fields, batting cages, a tot lot, and a recreation center and community gazebo with a Wi-Fi spot. Formerly known as Pinecrest Park, it was re-designated on November 9, 2004, in recognition of Pinecrest's first mayor.
- Suniland Park — A 10-acre (4.0 ha) park with baseball and football fields, batting cages, a recreation center, basketball courts, a tot lot and a gazebo with a Wi-Fi spot.
- Veterans Wayside Park — A 4.5-acre (1.8 ha) park with a freshwater lake and open recreation areas.

=== Pinecrest Gardens ===
Pinecrest Gardens has been described as the "crown jewel" of the village's park system. Known as South Florida's Cultural Arts Park, it is a large park featuring over 1,000 varieties of exotic tropical plants and trees. The park landscape features natural streams, sinkholes, caves and fissures. The park also offers various programs including summer camps, and is located on the former site of the Parrot Jungle.

== Transportation ==
Pinecrest is served by Metrobus throughout the area and by Miami Metrorail at the following stations:

- Dadeland North (SW 70th Avenue and U.S. 1)
- Dadeland South (Dadeland Boulevard and U.S. 1)

== Education ==
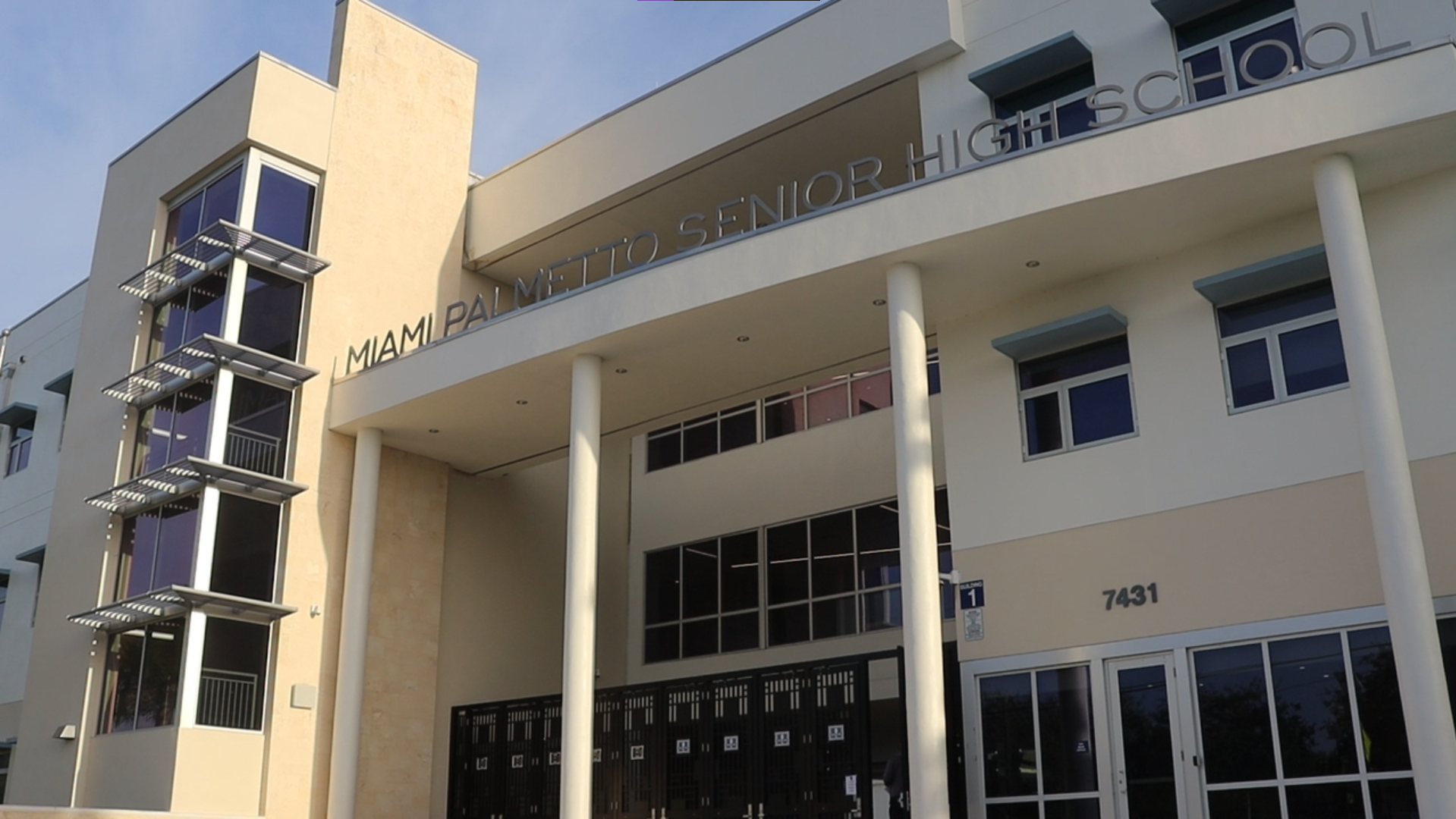
Miami Palmetto High School

Pinecrest is served by the Miami-Dade County Public Schools system.

Public elementary schools

- Pinecrest Elementary School – Opened in 1954
- Palmetto Elementary School
- Howard Drive Elementary School (Palmetto Bay)

Public middle schools

- Palmetto Middle School

Public high schools

- Miami Palmetto High School

Private schools:

- Bet Shira Congregation
- Gulliver Preparatory
- Kendall United Methodist
- Pinecrest Presbyterian
- St. Louis Covenant School
- Temple Beth Am

The Miami-Dade Public Library System operates the Pinecrest Branch.

Miami Hoshuko, a weekend school for Japanese citizens, previously held classes at the Kendall United Methodist Church, now in Pinecrest but formerly in the Kendall census-designated place as of 1990.

== Media ==
The Village of Pinecrest has its own newspaper, The Pinecrest Tribune, which is published bi-weekly and is part of Miami Community Newspapers. The village of Pinecrest is also served by the Miami market for local radio and television.
