= Pinecrest Gardens =

- Pinecrest Gardens (Parrot Jungle Historic District)
- U.S. National Register of Historic Places
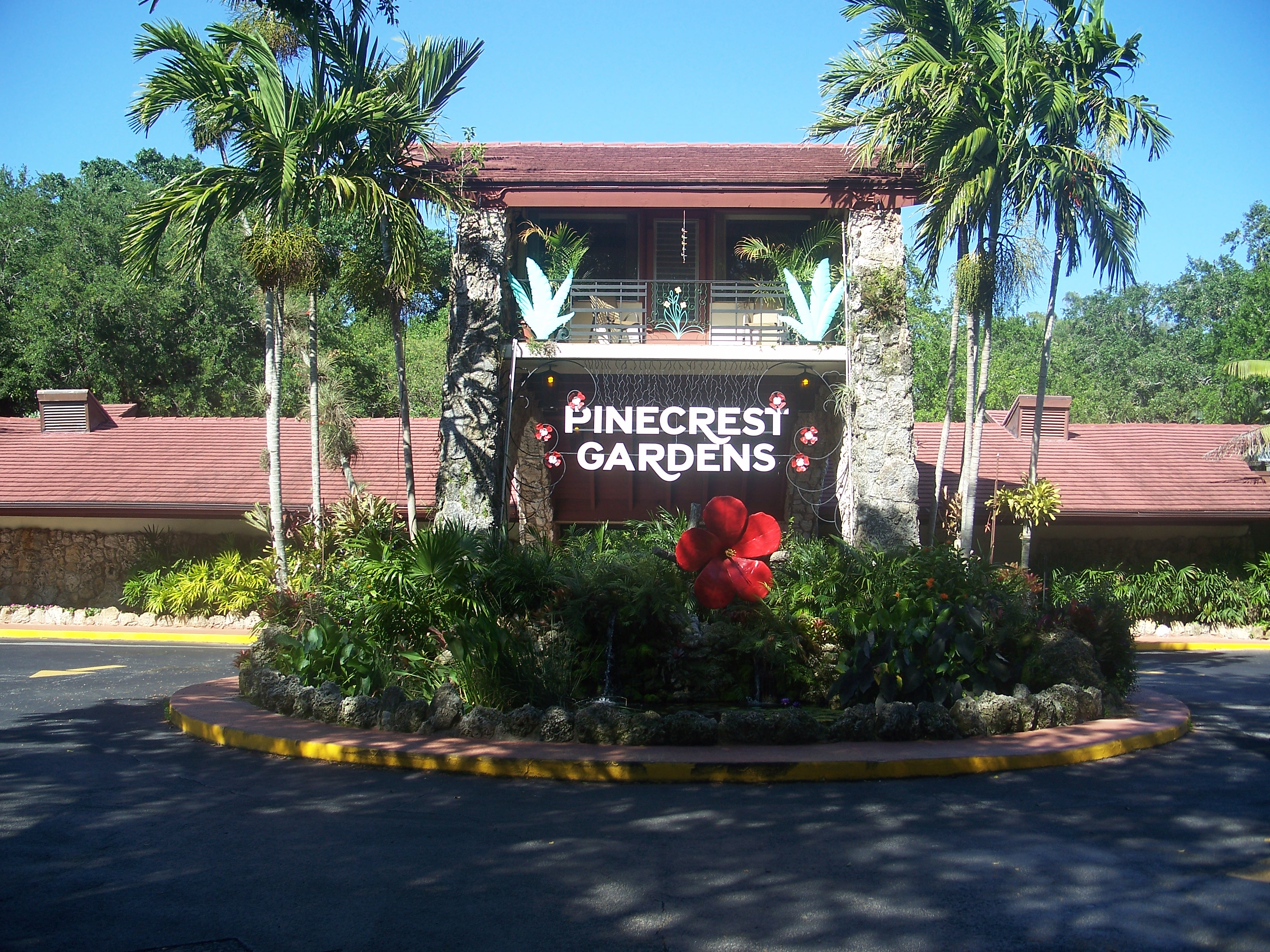
- Front entrance

- Location within Florida
- Interactive map of Pinecrest Gardens (Parrot Jungle Historic District)
- Location: 11000 SW 57th Ave, Pinecrest, Florida
- Nearest city: Miami, Florida
- Coordinates: 25°40′10″N 80°17′9″W
- NRHP reference No.: 11000735
- Added to NRHP: October 17, 2011

Pinecrest Gardens is a 20-acre (81,000 m^{2}) park in Pinecrest, Florida on the corner of Southwest 111th Street (Killian Drive) and Southwest 57th Avenue (Red Road).

It was the original location of the Parrot Jungle, a theme park started in 1936 until they relocated to the city of Miami's Watson Island in 2003. The Village of Pinecrest acquired the property over 60 years later in 2002, turning it into a dedicated municipal park. The gardens received a historic designation from the U.S. Department of the Interior October 17, 2011, adding it to the National Register of Historic Places as the Parrot Jungle Historic District and recognized by the Cultural Landscape Foundation.

Much of Parrot Jungle can still be seen in the property, today. At the time of acquiring the property, Village leadership recognized the historic nature and worked with the goal to preserve the site. From then on, the gardens have worked to maintain, preserve and restore much of the park's original features such as the original mosaic pathways, original birdcages and plant displays.

Based on their ecology, the park is divided into the Upper and Lower Gardens. The Upper Gardens have dry meadow gardens, a former Pine Rockland ecosystem, sunny vistas and display plantings. The Lower Gardens have more native ecosystems such as hardwood hammocks, tropical plantings and a native cypress slough.

The Gardens is home to a geodesic dome amphitheater, accommodating 530 seats that allows thousands to enjoy various performances each year. The dome was built in the early 1940's and is located front of the original Parrot Bowl (now named Hammock Pavilion).

The park includes a variety of sites including a Botanical gardens, butterfly exhibit, swan lake, zoo, children's playground, and a popular splash-n-play area. Various streams run throughout the pathways, housing turtles, koi fish and many other fish species. The park also hosts an annual fine arts festival, MagiCamp, and is available for rental for private parties, receptions, etc.

== Gallery ==
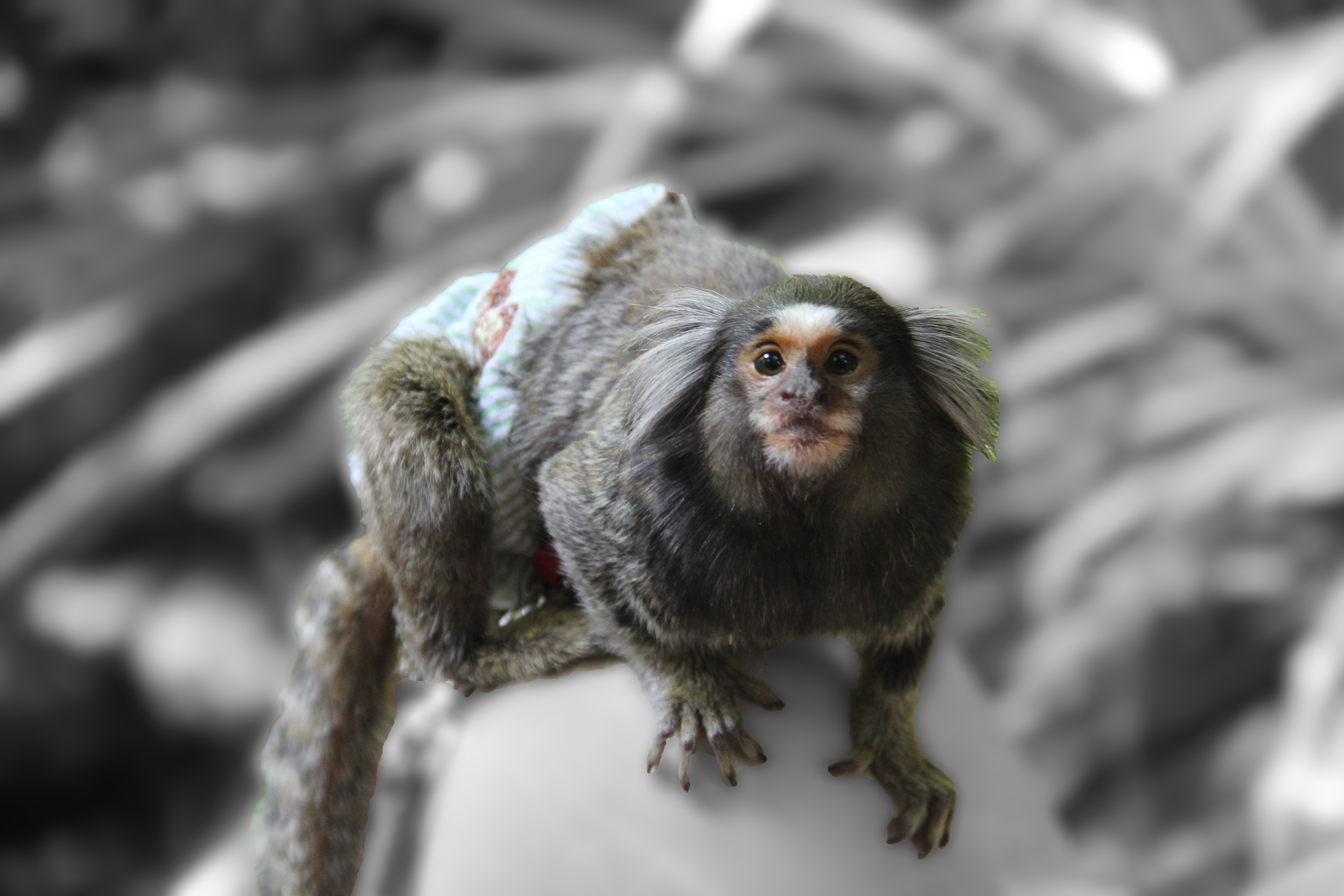
Baby monkey in diaper at Pinecrest Gardens, Miami, Florida.

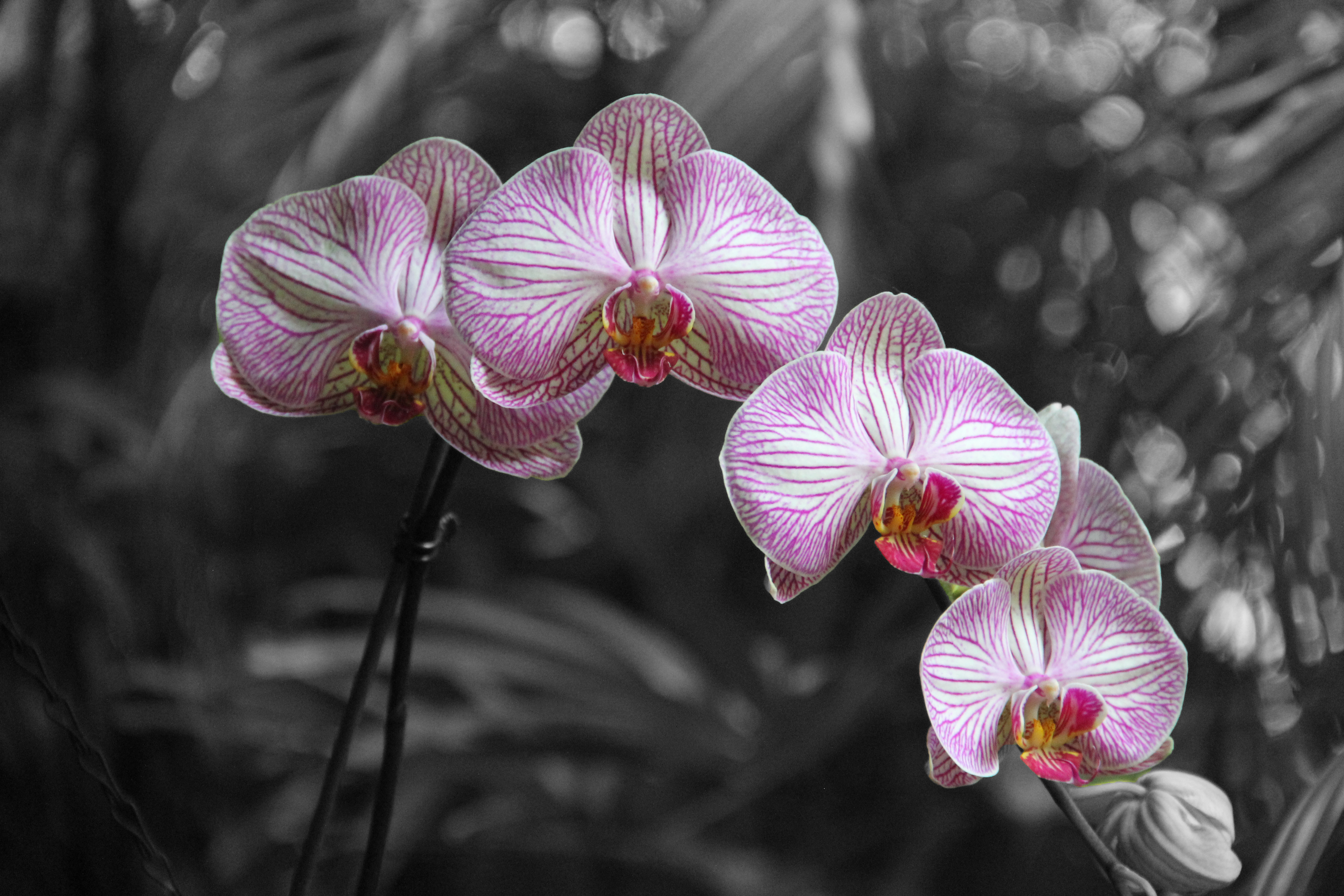
Flowers at Pinecrest Gardens, Miami, Florida.

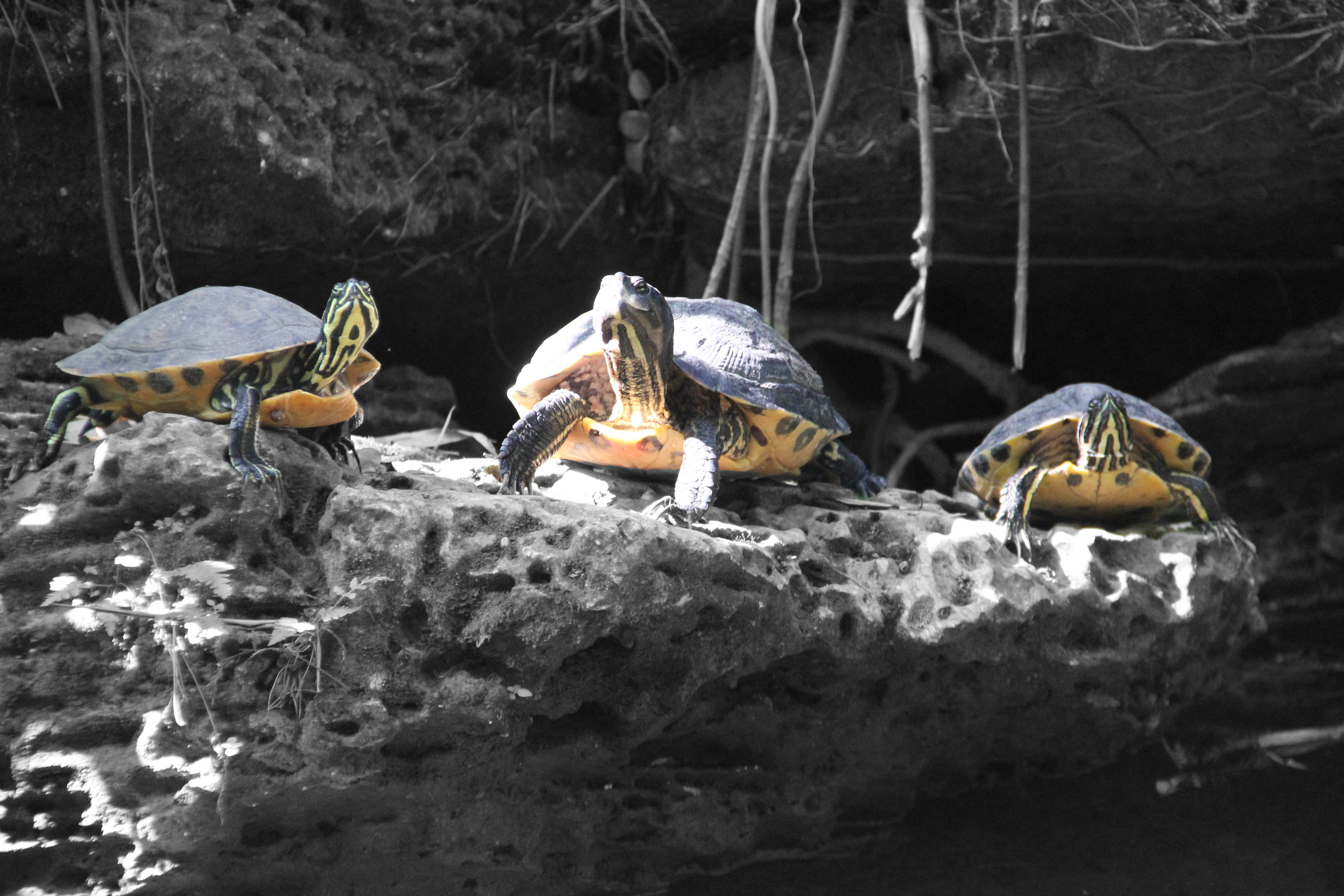
Three turtles at Pinecrest Gardens, Miami, Florida.

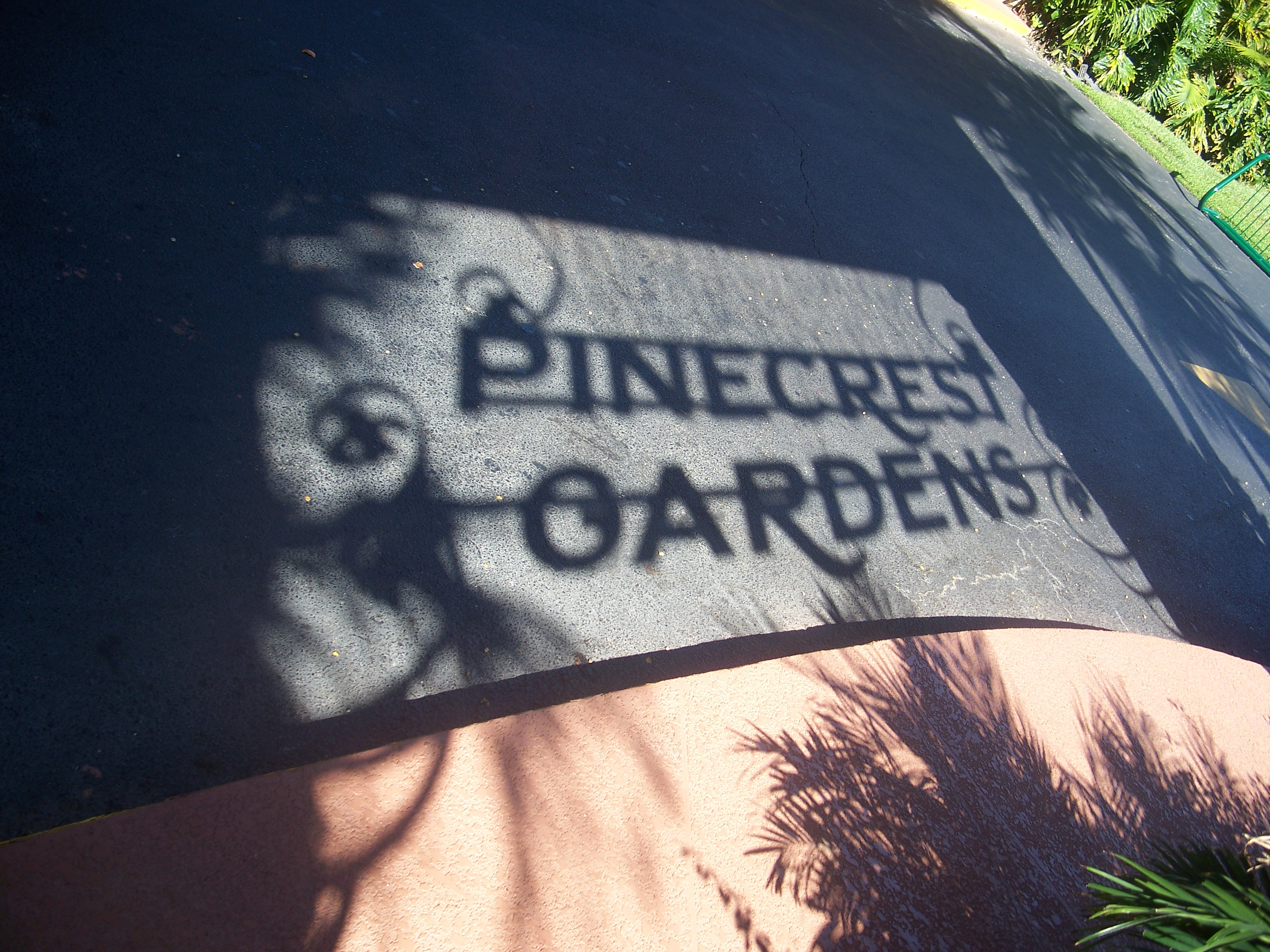
Park name in shadow

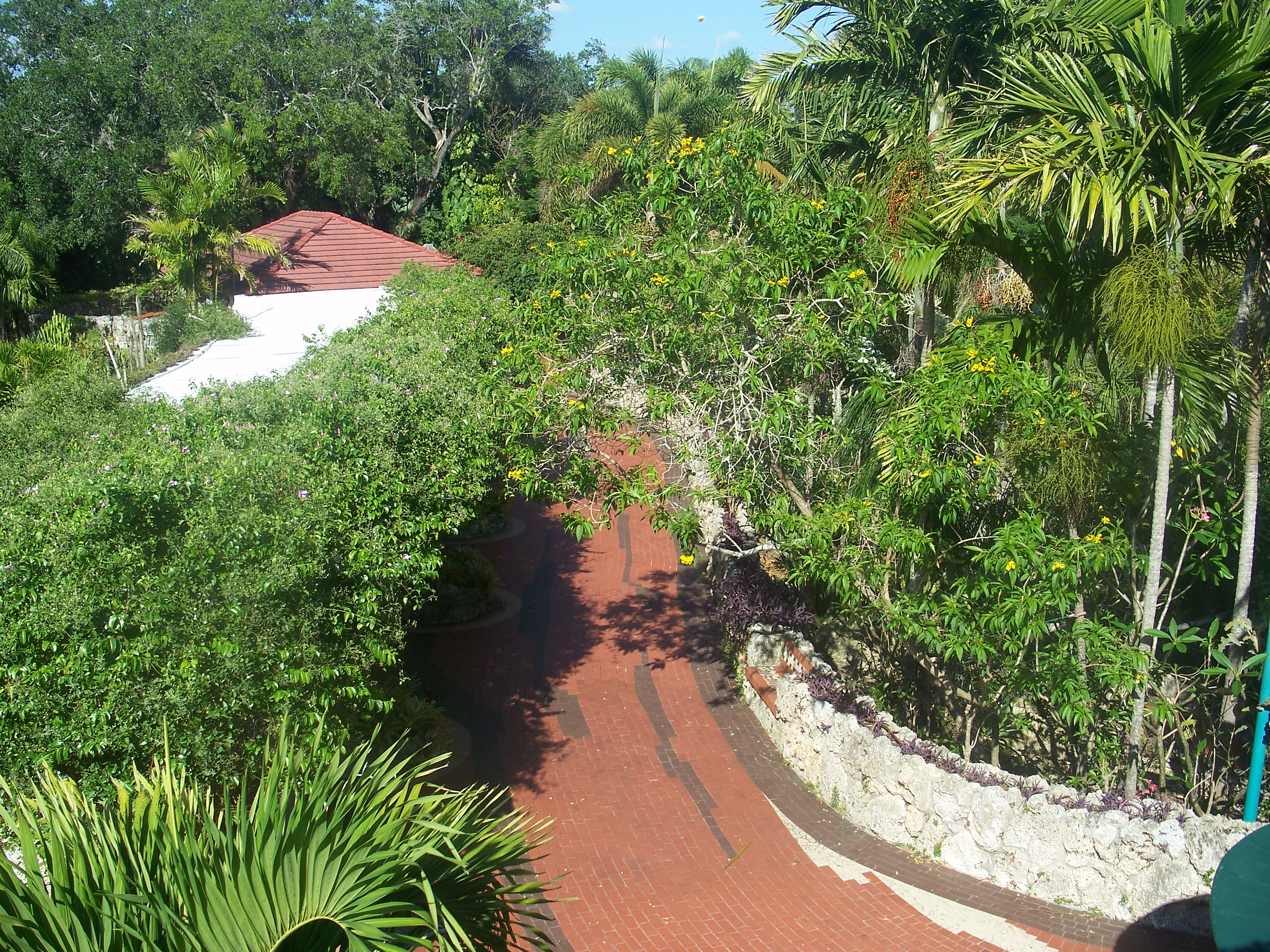
Looking down from atop the concession stand

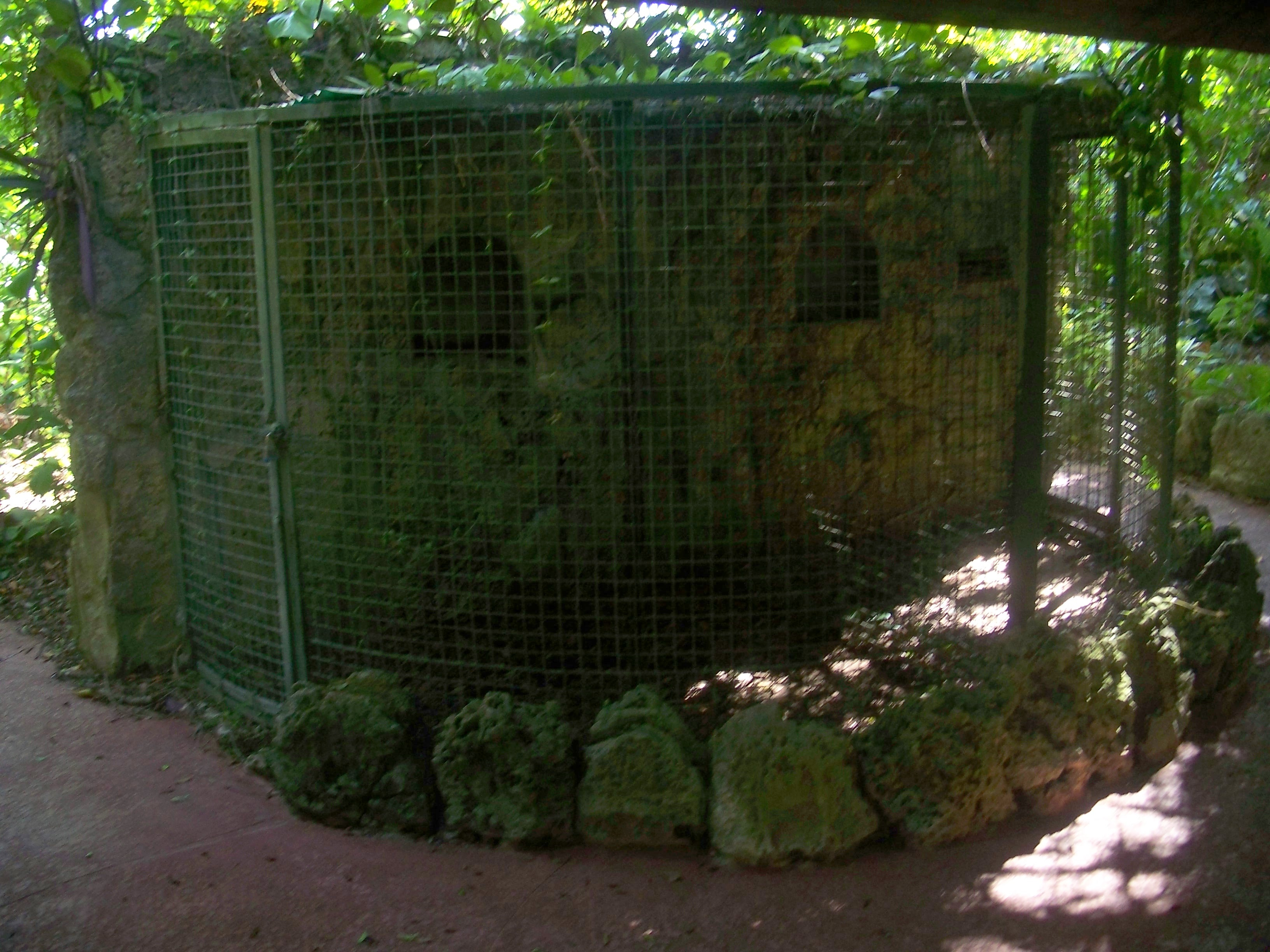
Old monkey cage

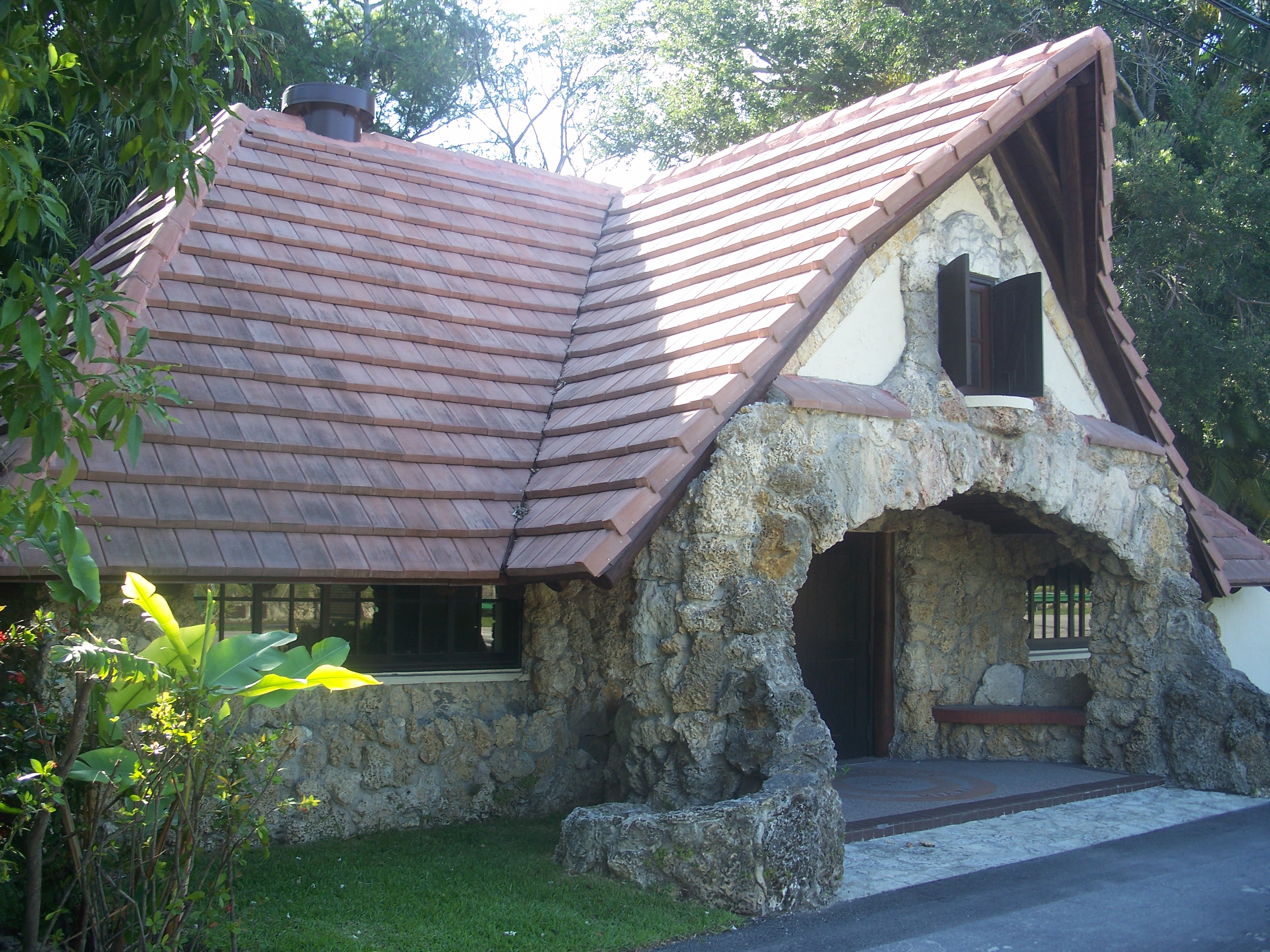
Original Parrot Jungle entrance

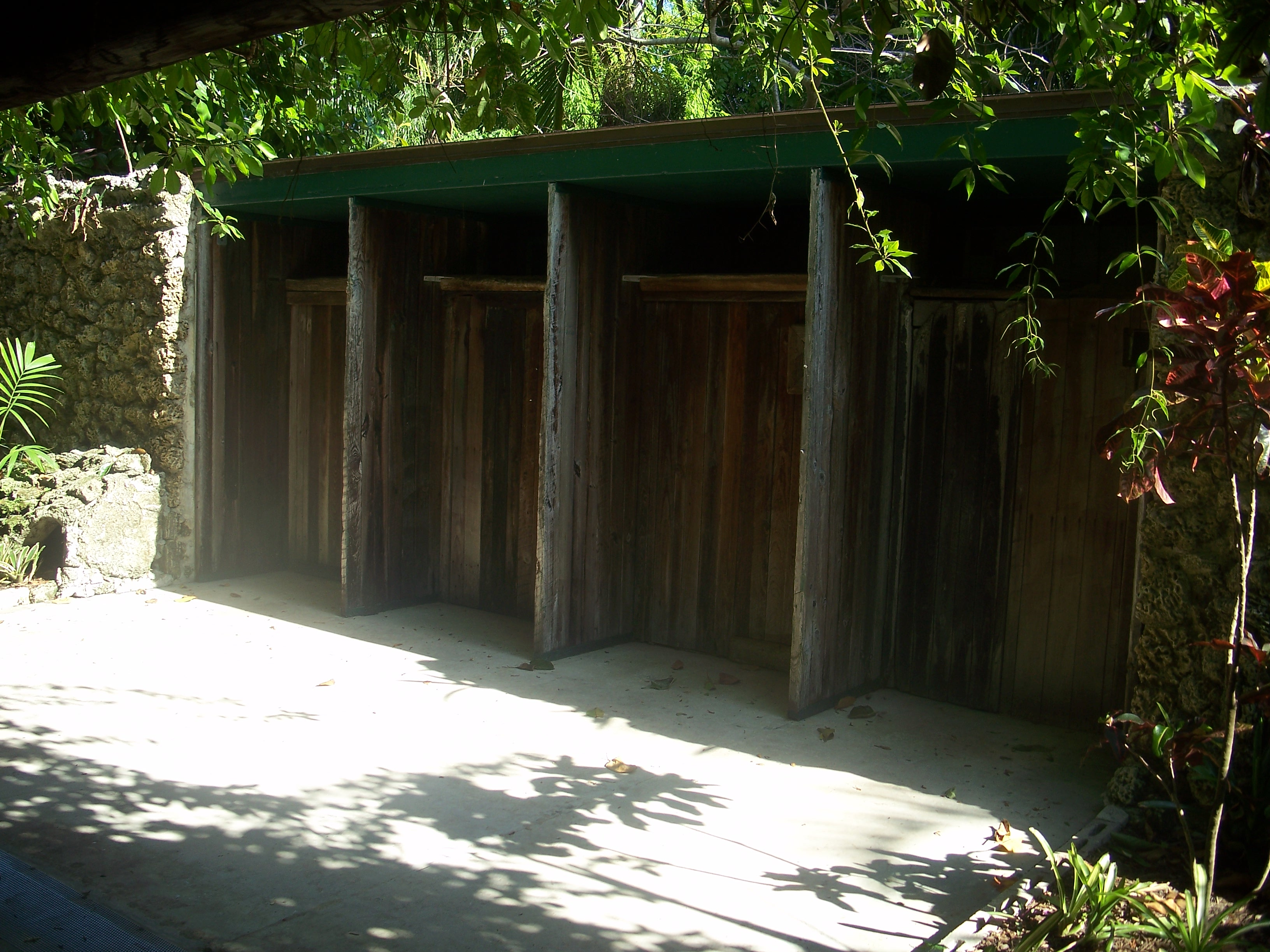
Parrot stalls

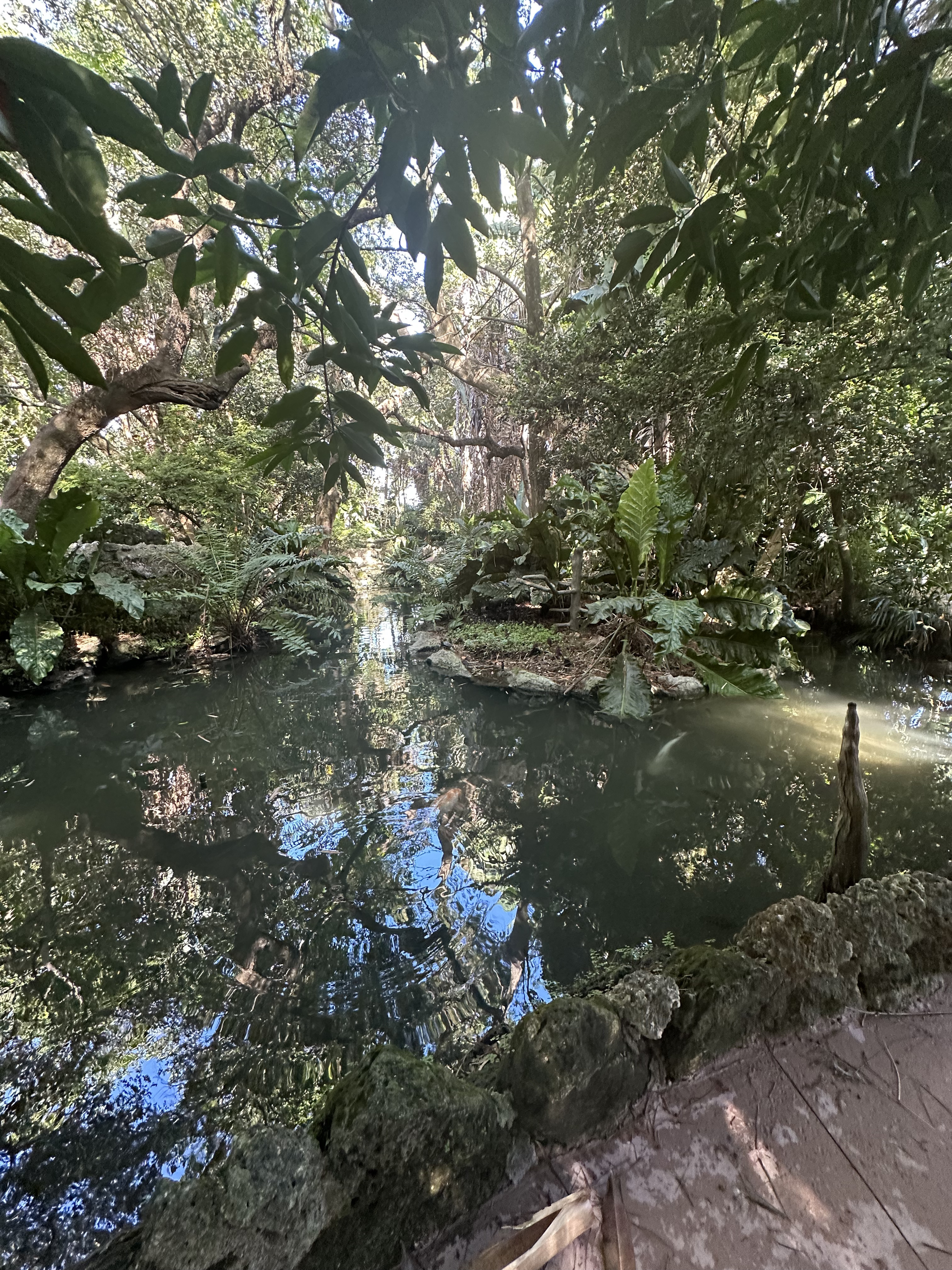
Koi fish in the Snapper Creek Waterway at Pinecrest Gardens

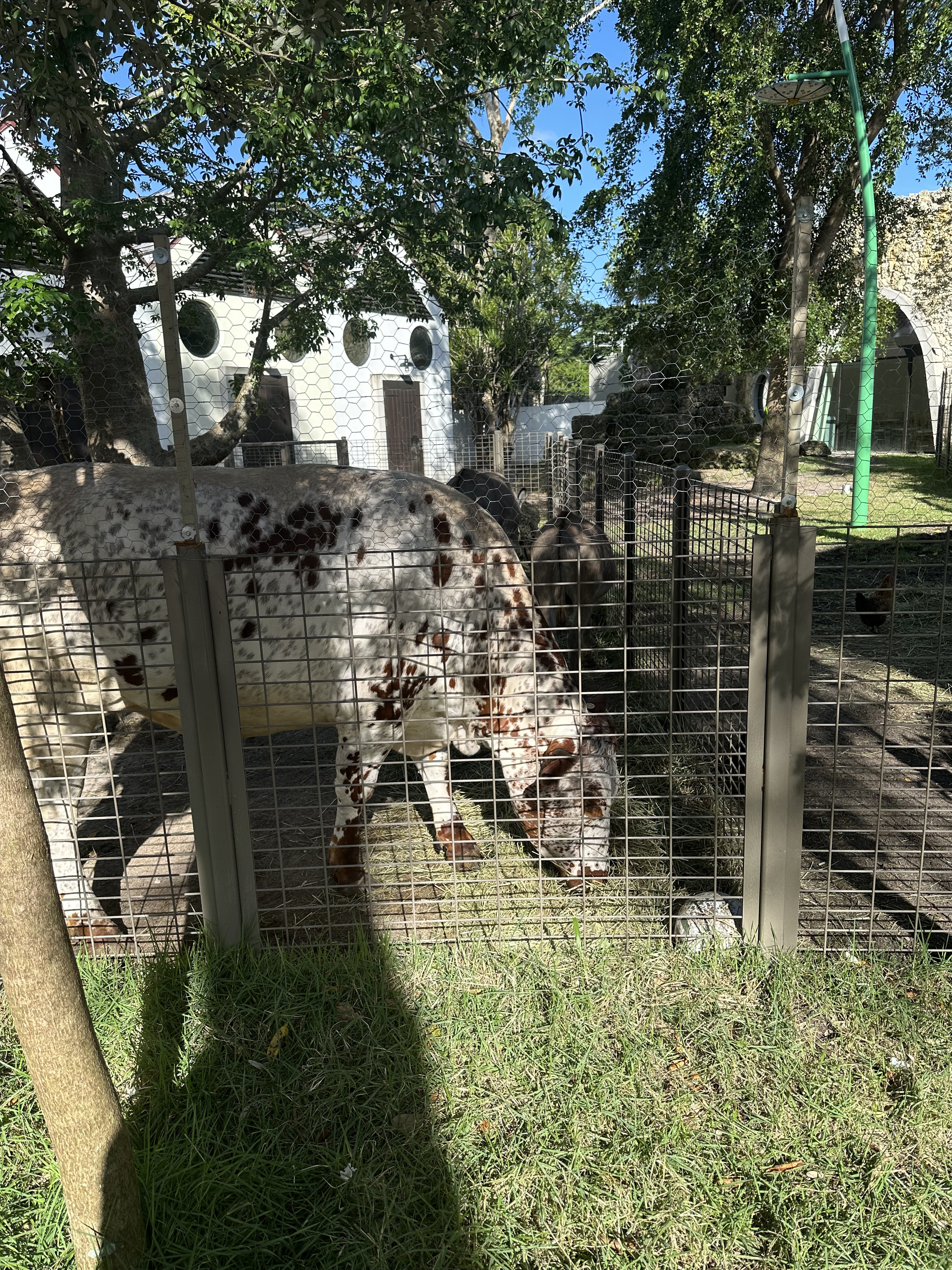
Petting Zoo at Pinecrest Gardens

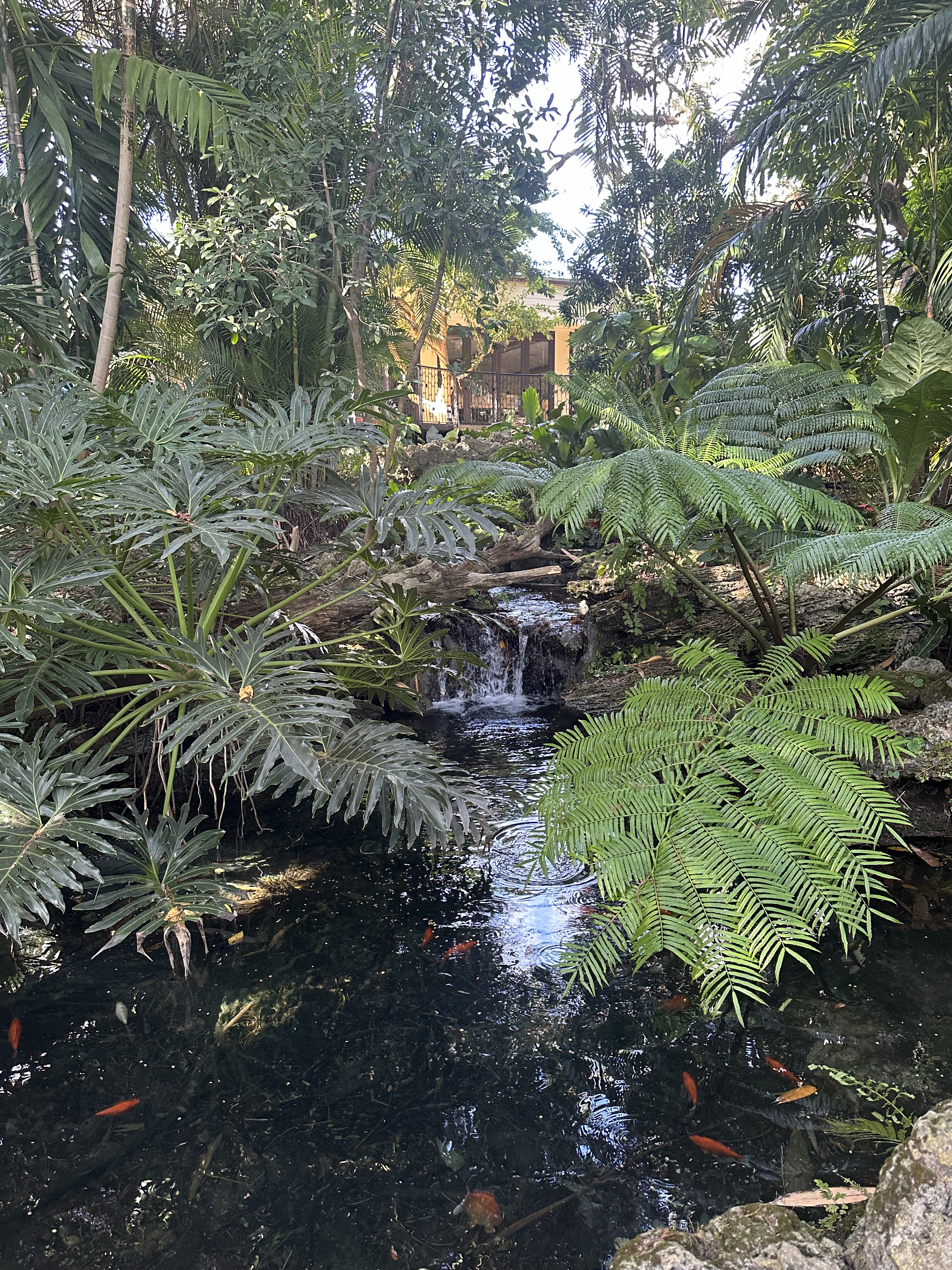
Small Cascade at Pinecrest Gardens

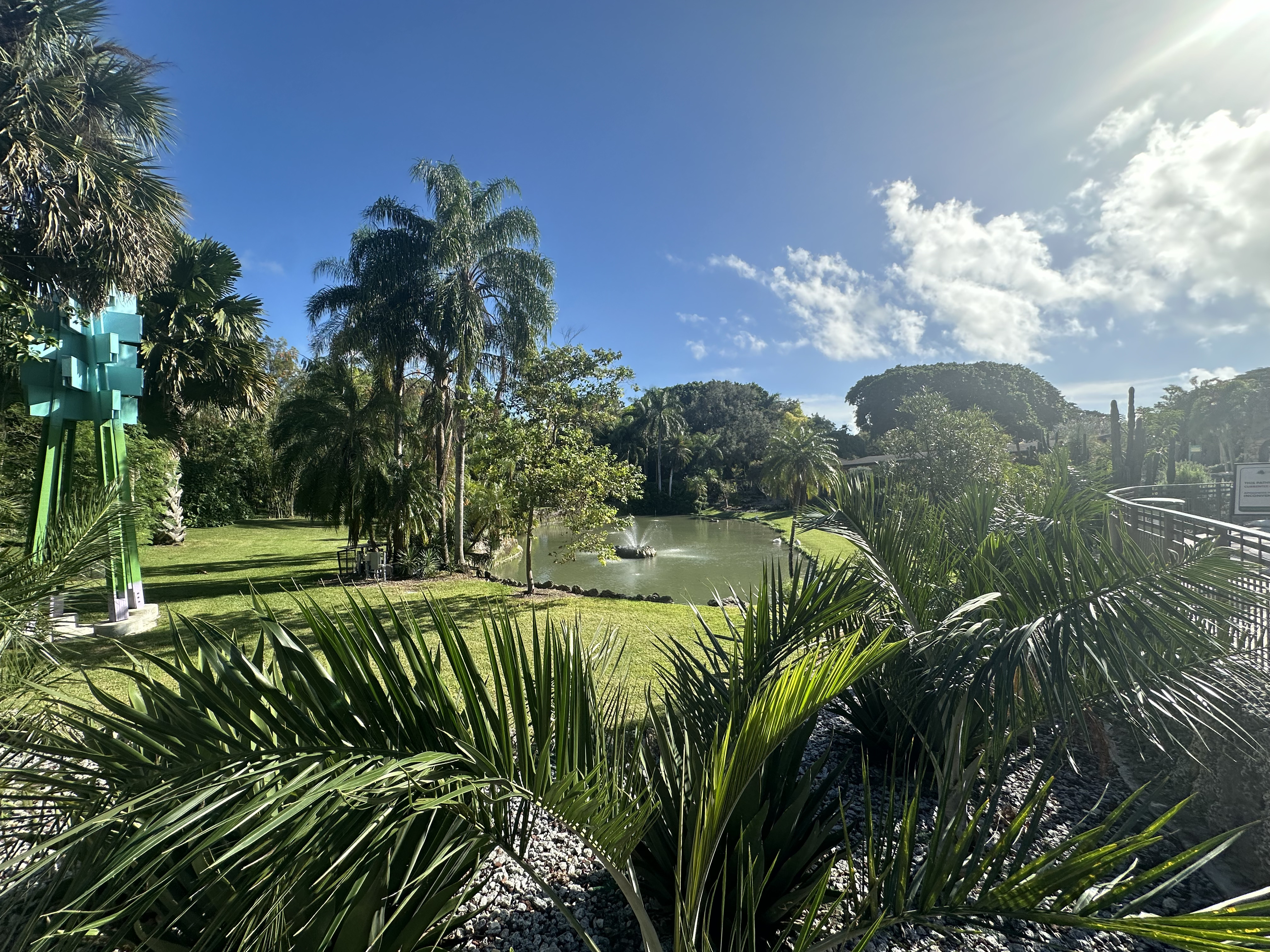
Swan Lake as seen from the Inspiration Center

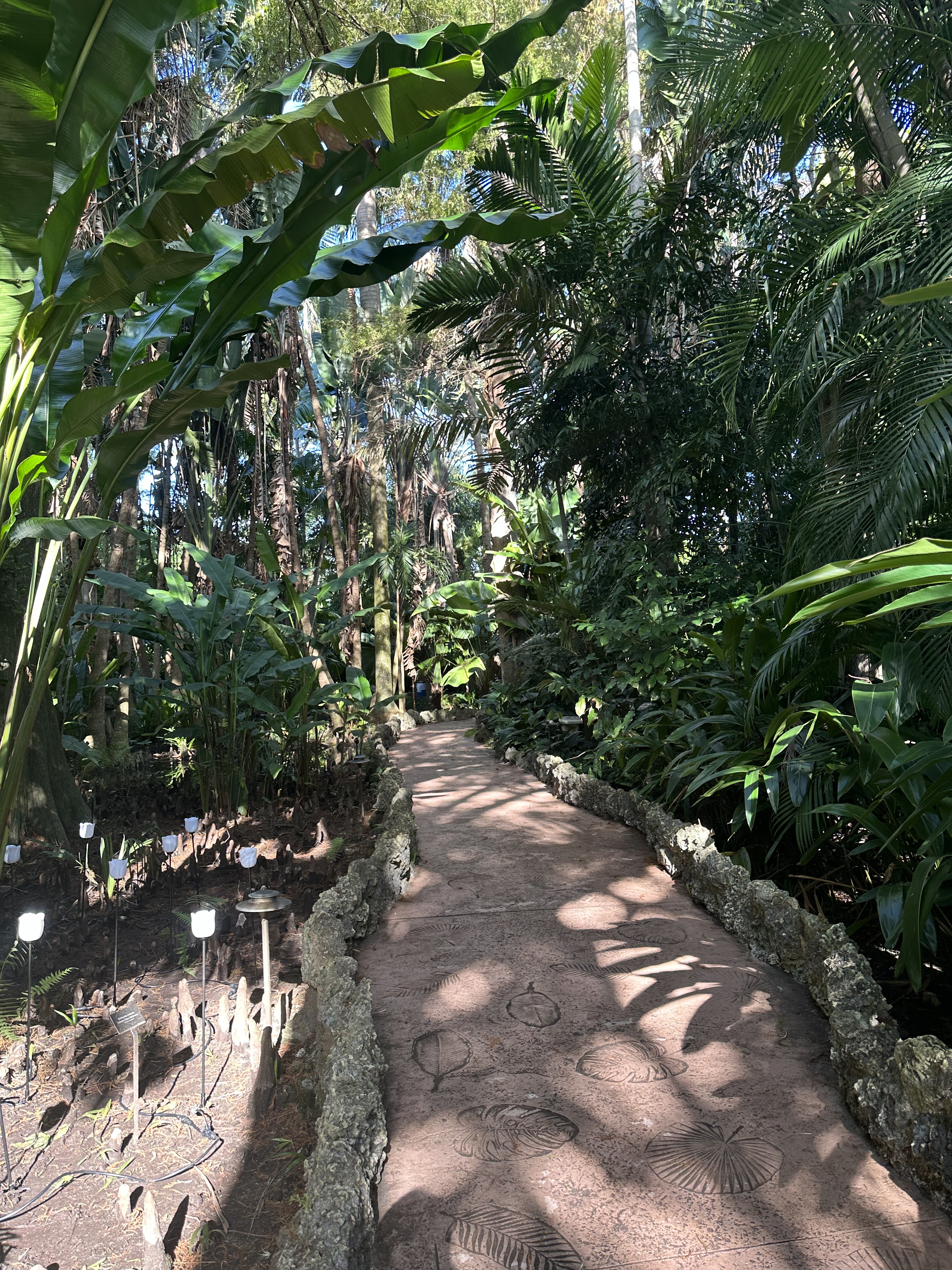
Pathway at Pinecrest Gardens

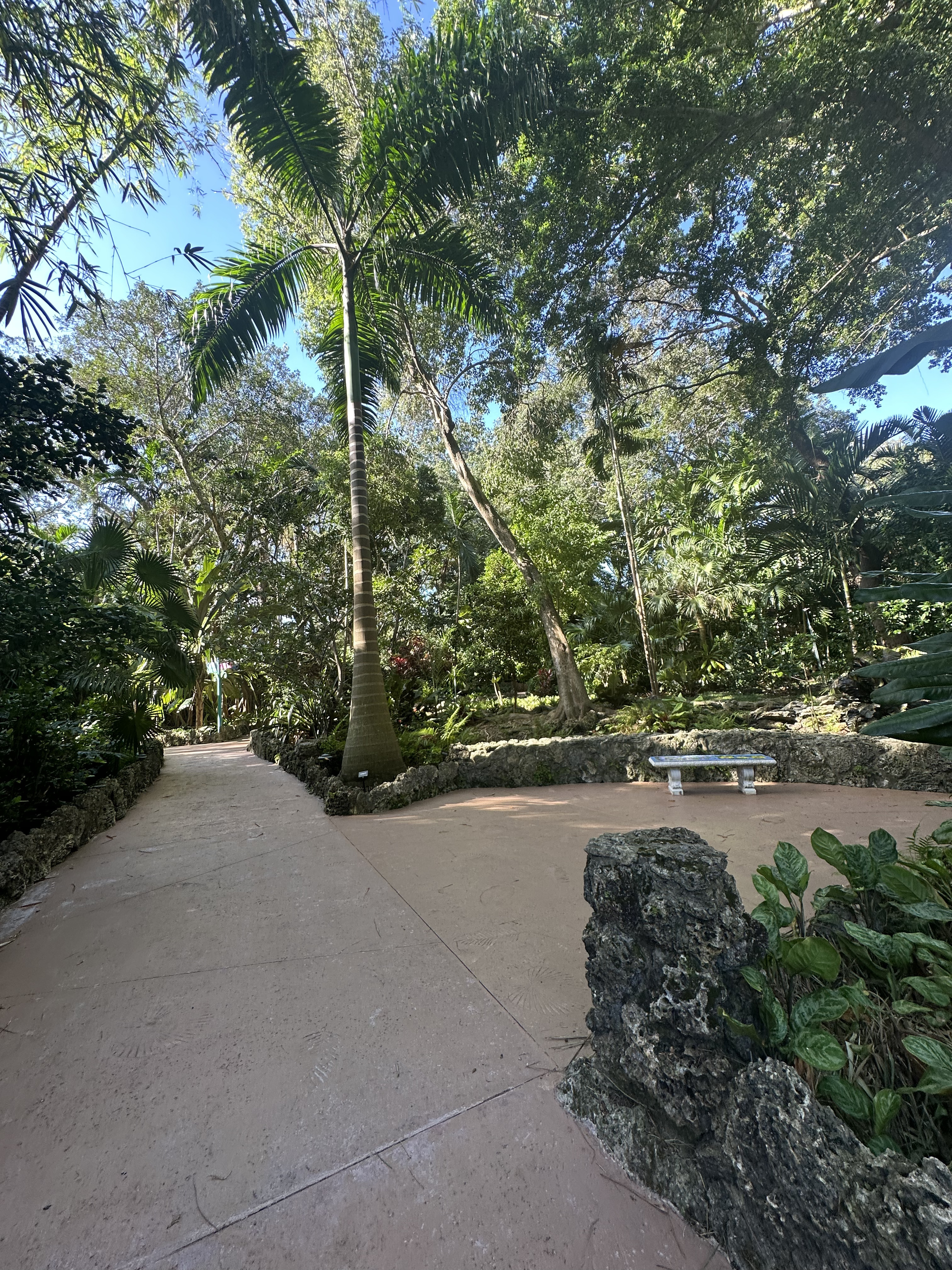
Path at Pinecrest Gardens
