= Bill Haast =

American snake enthusiast (1910-2011)

- Born: December 30, 1910; Paterson, New Jersey
- Died: June 15, 2011 (aged 100); Punta Gorda, Florida

Bill Haast (December 30, 1910 – June 15, 2011) was the owner and operator, from 1947 until 1984, of the Miami Serpentarium, a tourist attraction south of Miami, Florida (in what is now the Village of Pinecrest), where he entertained customers by performing live venom extraction from snakes. After closing the Serpentarium, he opened the Miami Serpentarium Laboratories, a facility in Punta Gorda, Florida that produced snake venom for medical and research use. Haast extracted venom from venomous snakes from the time he was a boy.

Haast physically extracted venom from venomous snakes by holding them by the head and forcing them to bite a rubber membrane covering a vial. As a result of handling these snakes, Haast had been bitten 172 times by mid-2008, all of which but the last few were validated by the Guinness Book of World Records "for surviving the most deadly snake bites", a distinction Haast disliked as he did not think being bitten was a goal to be attained or admired.

== Early life ==
Haast was born in Paterson, New Jersey, in 1910. He became interested in snakes while at a Boy Scout summer camp when he was 11 years old. He was bitten for the first time at summer camp a year later, when he tried to capture a small timber rattlesnake. He applied the standard snake-bite treatment of the time (making crossed cuts over the fang marks and applying potassium permanganate) and then walked four miles to the camp's first aid tent, by which time his arm was swollen. He was rushed to see a doctor, but quickly recovered without further treatment. His next bite, later the same year, came from a four-foot copperhead. He was carrying a snake-bite kit, and had a friend inject him with antivenom; the bite hospitalized him for a week.

Haast started collecting snakes and, after initial opposition from his mother, was allowed to keep them at home. He soon learned how to handle the snakes and found one timber rattler so easy to handle that he posed for a photograph with the snake lying across his lap. He started extracting venom from his snakes when he was 15 years old, and dropped out of school when he was 16 years old.

== Career ==
When he was 19 he joined a man who had a roadside snake exhibit, and went with him to Florida. While there, he ended up rooming with a moonshiner on the edge of the Everglades, and became proficient at capturing all kinds of snakes.

Haast eventually returned home, where his mother had leased a concession stand at a lakeside resort. Haast added a snake exhibit to the business. There he met and eloped with his first wife, Ann. They moved to Florida so that Haast could pursue his dream of opening a "snake farm". After his wife became pregnant, Haast lost his job when the speakeasy he was working at was raided by IRS agents. The couple moved back to New Jersey, where Haast studied aviation mechanics, and was certified after four years.

With his certification, he moved to Miami to work for Pan American World Airways. After the United States entered World War II, Haast served as a flight engineer on Pan Am airliners flying under contract to the United States Army Air Corps. These flights took him to South America, Africa and India, where he bought snakes to bring back to America, including his first cobra.

In those days there were no laws prohibiting it, but the crew members didn't appreciate it.

— Bill Haast

=== The Serpentarium ===
In 1946 Haast decided he had enough money saved to start his snake farm. He bought a plot of land facing U.S. 1, south of Miami, then sold his house and started construction on the Serpentarium. His wife Ann did not approve, and they eventually divorced. Haast retained custody of their son, Bill Jr. and continued to work as a mechanic for Pan Am while he built the Serpentarium. During this time Haast met and married his second wife, Clarita Matthews. The Serpentarium opened at the end of 1947, still not completed. For the first five years Bill, Clarita, and his son were the only staff. Bill Jr. eventually left, having lost interest in snakes, but not before he had been bitten four times by venomous snakes.

By 1965 the Serpentarium housed more than 500 snakes in 400 cages and three pits in the courtyard. Haast extracted venom 70 to 100 times a day from some 60 species of venomous snakes, usually in front of an audience of paying customers. He would free the snakes on a table in front of him, then catch the snakes bare-handed, and force them to eject their venom into glass vials with a rubber membrane stretched across the top.

Soon after opening the Serpentarium, Haast began experimenting with building up an acquired immunity to the venom of King, Indian and Cape cobras by injecting himself with gradually increasing quantities of venom he had extracted from his snakes, a practice called mithridatism. In 1954 Haast was bitten by a common, or blue, krait. At first he believed his immunization to cobra venom would protect him from the krait venom, and continued with his regular activities for several hours. However, the venom eventually did affect him, and he was taken to a hospital where it took him several days to recover. A krait anti-venom was shipped from India, but when it arrived after a 48-hour flight, he refused to accept it. He received his first cobra bite less than a year after he started his immunization program. During the 1950s, he was bitten by cobras about twenty times. His first king cobra bite was in 1962. Haast was also bitten by a green mamba. Many times Haast donated his blood to be used in treating snake-bite victims when a suitable anti-venom was not available. More than twenty of those individuals recovered.

In 1949, he began supplying venom to a medical researcher at the University of Miami for experiments in the treatment of polio. The experiments gave encouraging results, but were still in preliminary clinical trials when the Salk polio vaccine was released in 1955.

On September 3, 1977, a 6-year-old boy sitting atop the wall surrounding the Serpentarium's alligator and crocodile pit fell into the pit, and a 12-foot crocodile lunged ten feet and grabbed the boy. The boy's father and another man, Nicolas Caulineau, jumped into the pit and straddled the crocodile. Nonetheless, the boy, who was battered and submerged, was killed. The incident left Bill Haast badly shaken. Haast shot the crocodile, which weighed 1,800 pounds (820 kg), nine times with a Luger pistol, yet it was still an hour before it died. Before this, the crocodile had lived for 20 years in the pit without incident. Haast's mental trauma over the boy's death eventually led to the closure of the Serpentarium on South Dixie Highway. Although the boy's father did not blame Haast for his son's death, Haast told reporters he wanted nothing else to do with the Serpentarium and, in any event, would never again house crocodiles there. The incident did not end Haast's interest in venom research.

== Later life ==
Haast closed the Serpentarium in 1984, and moved to Utah for a few years. In 1990 he moved to Punta Gorda, Florida, with his snakes, where he established the Miami Serpentarium Laboratories. Haast's hands suffered venom-caused tissue damage, culminating in the loss of a finger following a bite from a Malayan pit viper in 2003. As a result of the damage, Haast gave up handling venomous snakes, and no longer kept any at his facility. As of 2008 he continued to have his wife inject him with small amounts of snake venom. In an August 2008 Florida Trend interview, he stated, "Aging is hard. Sometimes, you feel useless. But I always felt I would live this long. It was intuitive. I always told people I'd live past 100, and I still feel I will. Is it the venom? I don't know."

Haast turned 100 in December 2010 and died on June 15, 2011.
