= Dennis Potter bibliography =

Dennis Potter (17 May 1935 – 7 June 1994) was an English dramatist with a large canon of work.

== Television plays ==
- 1965 The Wednesday Play: The Confidence Course (no recording exists)
- 1965 Alice
- 1965 Almost Cinderella (not produced)
- 1965 Stand Up, Nigel Barton
- 1965 Vote Vote Vote for Nigel Barton
- 1966 Emergency – Ward 9
- 1966 Where the Buffalo Roam
- 1967 Message for Posterity (no recording exists)
- 1968 The Bonegrinder
- 1968 Shaggy Dog
- 1968 A Beast With Two Backs
- 1969 Moonlight on the Highway
- 1969 Son of Man
- 1970 Lay Down your Arms
- 1970 Angels Are So Few
- 1971 Paper Roses
- 1971 Traitor
- 1972 Follow the Yellow Brick Road
- 1973 Only Make Believe
- 1973 A Tragedy of Two Ambitions
- 1974 Joe's Ark
- 1974 Schmoedipus
- 1976 Double Dare
- 1976 Where Adam Stood
- 1979 Blue Remembered Hills
- 1980 Blade on the Feather
- 1980 Rain on the Roof
- 1980 Cream in My Coffee
- 1987 Visitors
- 1987 Brimstone and Treacle (after an 11-year ban on the play, originally intended for transmission in 1976, was finally lifted)
- 1994 Message for Posterity (remake of 1967 play)

== Television Serials ==
- 1971 Casanova
- 1975 Late Call
- 1978 The Mayor of Casterbridge
- 1978 Pennies from Heaven
- 1985 Tender Is the Night
- 1986 The Singing Detective
- 1988 Christabel
- 1989 Blackeyes (writer, director)
- 1993 Lipstick on Your Collar
- 1996 Karaoke
- 1996 Cold Lazarus

== Cinema films ==
- 1981 Pennies from Heaven
- 1982 Brimstone and Treacle
- 1983 Gorky Park
- 1985 Dreamchild
- 1988 Track 29 (reworking of Schmoedipus)
- 1991 Secret Friends (writer, director)
- 1993 Mesmer
- 1993 Midnight Movie (intended for commercial release)
- 2003 The Singing Detective

== Stage ==
- 1983 Sufficient Carbohydrate

== Publications ==
- The Glittering Coffin, London: Gollancz, 1960.
- The Changing Forest: Life in the Forest of Dean Today. London: Secker and Warburg, 1962.
- The Nigel Barton Plays: Stand Up, Nigel Barton, Vote Vote Vote for Nigel Barton: Two Television Plays. Harmondsworth, U.K.: Penguin, 1968.
- Son of Man (television play). London: Samuel French, 1970.
- Hide and Seek (novel). London: Deutsch, 1973.
- Brimstone and Treacle (television play). New York, Samuel French, 1978.
- Pennies from Heaven (novel). London: Quartet, 1981.
- Sufficient Carbohydrate (play). London: Faber, 1983.
- Waiting for the Boat: Dennis Potter on Television. London: Faber, 1984.
- The Singing Detective (television series). London: Faber, 1986.
- Ticket to Ride (novel). London: Faber, 1986.
- Blackeyes (novel). London: Faber, 1987.
- Christabel (television series), 1988.
- Potter on Potter, ed. by Graham Fuller. London; Boston: Faber and Faber, 1993.
- Seeing the Blossom: Two Interviews, A Lecture and A Story. London; Boston: Faber and Faber, 1994.
- Karaoke and Cold Lazarus (television plays). London: Faber, 1996.
