= Moonlight on the Highway =

- Written by: Dennis Potter
- Directed by: James MacTaggart
- Starring: Ian Holm; Anthony Bate
- Music by: Al Bowlly
- Country of origin: United Kingdom

Production
- Producer: Kenith Trodd
- Running time: 52 minutes

Original release
- Network: ITV
- Release: 12 April 1969

Moonlight on the Highway is a television play by Dennis Potter, first broadcast in the United Kingdom on 12 April 1969 as part of ITV's Saturday Night Theatre strand. The title owes to the recording of the song with the same name made by Al Bowlly in 1938. The tale of a young Al Bowlly fanatic attempting to blot out memories of sexual abuse via his fixation with the singer, the play was the first of Potter's works to use popular music as a dramatic device and strongly anticipated Potter's later 'serials with songs' Pennies from Heaven (1978), The Singing Detective (1986) and Lipstick on Your Collar (1993).

== Synopsis ==
Al Bowlly obsessive David Peters (Ian Holm) is visited in his run-down bedsit by Marie (Deborah Grant), a researcher for Severn Television, who is collecting material for a documentary about the singer. David is the editor of the Al Bowlly Appreciation Society fanzine and Marie hopes to secure him as the programme advisor. David is enthusiastic about the offer but has other things on his mind; he has an appointment with an NHS psychiatrist the following day and his anxiety about the meeting, coupled with the novelty of entertaining his beautiful visitor, leads him to make an unwelcome pass at her. Marie fights off his advances and runs out the flat, leaving a defeated David to reflect on his problems.

In the waiting room the next day, David gets into an altercation with an elderly patient who has never heard of Al Bowlly. By the time he is finally called to see Dr Chilton (Anthony Bate), David is agitated by the older man's ignorance – especially as today is the anniversary of Bowlly's death. The doctor's calm demeanour, however, soon puts David at ease and, with some difficulty, David explains that his mother died six weeks earlier after having nursed her throughout his adult life and harrowingly recounts how, at the age of ten, he was abducted by a stranger and sexually assaulted. Alongside these traumatic events, David hints at some "wicked" acts he has committed but Chilton stops him before he can elaborate on these and prescribes him some anti-depressants. He is warned not to drink alcohol or eat cheese while taking the tablets as they will "make [his] tongue wag."

After David leaves, Chilton informs the two student doctors who have been in attendance throughout the session that he believes David's claustrophobic relationship with his disabled mother and the earlier torment of sexual abuse have resulted in a sense of sexual disgust that he overcomes in his obsession with the innocent music of Al Bowlly. Chilton dismisses his junior colleagues' concerns that David may attempt suicide and suggests it is more likely that the desperate desire to discharge his secrets will perhaps lead him to confide in a friend.

Later that evening, David attends the annual meeting of the Al Bowlly Appreciation Society. Relieved that his ordeal with the psychiatrist is over, David forgets the warning not to mix his medication with alcohol and drinks heavily. After much merriment, the Society President calls David up on stage to talk about the success of the fanzine. As David holds forth in his speech about the beauty and innocence of Bowlly's music his mind wanders back to the sexual assault and, realising he is surrounded by friends whose attitudes to love and sex match his own, reveals that he has slept with 136 prostitutes. As he leaves the stage and the scandalised Society members return to their festivities, a jubilant David approaches a large blown-up photograph of Bowlly mounted on the wall. He smiles: "Good old Al!"

=== Principal cast ===
- Ian Holm as David Peters
- Wally Patch as Old Londoner
- Anthony Bate as Dr Chilton
- Deborah Grant as Marie Holdsworth
- Robin Wentworth as Al Bowlly Appreciation Society President
- Frederick Peisley as Gerald
- Derek Woodward as first medical student
- John Flanagan as second medical student

=== Music ===
(All songs recorded by Al Bowlly and the Lew Stone Orchestra)

- "Moonlight on the Highway" (21 March 1938)
- "Lover, Come Back to Me" (13 November 1933)
- "Just Let Me Look at You" (12 August 1938)
- "Easy Come, Easy Go" (15 June 1934)
- "Brother, Can You Spare a Dime?" (12 December 1933)
- "Oh! Mr Moon" (12 April 1933)
- "You'll Always Be the Same Sweetheart" (2 December 1932)
- "My Melancholy Baby" (1934 Pathé News film extract)

Songs quoted in dialogue but do not feature on the soundtrack include:

- "You Couldn't Be Cuter"
- "Marie"
- "Isn't It Heavenly?"
- "I Love You Truly"
- "Love Is the Sweetest Thing"

== Production ==
Kenith Trodd, Potter's producer and long-time friend since their days at Oxford, introduced the author to the popular songs of the 1930s and 40s through an article he wrote for the university magazine Isis. Trodd acted as musical advisor on the play, a role he reprised for Potters later 'serials with songs' and the 1981 MGM film version of Pennies from Heaven.

Moonlight on the Highway contains a number of semi-autobiographical elements. In 1945 the ten-year-old Potter and his sister June went to stay with their mother's relatives in Hammersmith, West London. Potter shared a bedroom with his bachelor uncle Ernie who sexually abused him. Potter first spoke publicly about the event in his introduction to Waiting for the Boat (published 1984) and later during his James MacTaggart Memorial Lecture at the 1993 Edinburgh Television Festival. The main character of Moonlight appears to live in Hammersmith and it is established during a montage sequence that the abuse David suffers occurred sometime around VJ Day, as Potter declared his had.

In Humphrey Carpenter's 1998 Potter biography, Kenith Trodd claimed that at an unspecified point in the early 1960s Potter confessed to having regularly used prostitutes while working in London; the number of women he visited allegedly matched the number of David Peters' conquests in Moonlight. Gareth Davies, who directed several of Potter's plays in the 1960s, also claims that Potter admitted to using prostitutes around this time but this time the number was much higher. These claims, however, have not been substantiated.

The play text was substantially cut for time, with twenty minutes of material featuring David's encounters with prostitutes being excised.

== Style and themes ==
The play is structured as a nonlinear narrative. The main action of the drama takes place at Chilton's practice, while other scenes (David's attempt to seduce Marie and the meeting of the Al Bowlly Appreciation Society) are incorporated as flashbacks or flashforwards. David's memories of sexual abuse and the death of his mother are represented with overlays and montage sequences, accompanied by Al Bowlly music on the soundtrack.

Potter uses Bowlly's songs to represent both David's desire to return to innocence and as a means for the character to express through Bowlly's lyrics the emotions that he can never express in his own words. When David unsuccessfully attempts to seduce Marie he plays her "Just Let Me Look at You" in the hope that Bowlly's words will make her understand his desire, while during his meeting with Dr Chilton he recites the lyrics of several Bowlly songs to explain the horror of his ordeal at the hands of his abuser. Potter's witty resetting of the meaning behind the Bowlly tracks used throughout the drama finds its apotheosis in the extra-diegetic, and ironic, use of "Lover, Come Back to Me" and "Easy Come, Easy Go": the former song accompanying David's memories of the assault, the latter as he attempts to recount his experiences to Chilton – suggesting the nature of his lost innocence.

== Intertextuality ==
Potter would later use popular music as a means to heighten the dramatic tension in his work in the serials Pennies from Heaven (1978), The Singing Detective (1986), Lipstick on Your Collar (1993) and the play Cream in My Coffee (1980).

The theme of sexual abuse is returned to in Only Make Believe (1973), Brimstone and Treacle (1976), Where Adam Stood (1976), Blue Remembered Hills (1979), Blackeyes (1989), Cold Lazarus (1996) and the novel Hide and Seek (1974).

Characters also undergo psychiatric assessment in Follow the Yellow Brick Road (1972), Hide and Seek and The Singing Detective.

== Broadcast and commercial release ==
The play was broadcast on ITV on 12 April 1969. It was released in the Network DVD collection Dennis Potter at London Weekend Television alongside the dramatist's other work for the company.

== Sources ==
- Humphrey Carpenter, Dennis Potter: A Biography; 1998
- Graham Fuller (Ed.), Potter on Potter; 1993
- W.S. Gilbert, Fight and Kick and Bite: The Life and Work of Dennis Potter; 1995
- Nigel Williams (Ed.), Arena: Painting the Clouds; 2005
- Nigel Williams (Ed.), Arena: It's in the Songs; 2005
