= Edge of Darkness =

British television drama serial

- Genre: Drama; Political thriller; Science fiction
- Written by: Troy Kennedy Martin
- Directed by: Martin Campbell
- Starring: Bob Peck; Joanne Whalley; Joe Don Baker; Charles Kay; Ian McNeice
- Composers: Michael Kamen; Eric Clapton
- Country of origin: United Kingdom
- Original language: English
- No. of episodes: 6

Production
- Producer: Michael Wearing
- Cinematography: Andrew Dunn
- Camera setup: Single-camera
- Running time: c. 50-minute episodes

Original release
- Network: BBC2
- Release: 4 November – 9 December 1985

Edge of Darkness is a 1985 British television drama serial produced by BBC Television in association with Lionheart Television International. Originally broadcast in six episodes in late 1985, it is part crime drama and political thriller, and revolves around the efforts of widowed policeman Ronald Craven (played by Bob Peck) to unravel the truth behind the killing of his daughter, Emma (played by Joanne Whalley). Craven's investigations soon lead him into a murky world of government and corporate cover-ups and nuclear espionage, pitting him against dark forces that threaten the future of life on Earth.

Writer Troy Kennedy Martin was greatly influenced by the political climate of the time, dominated by the Thatcher government, and the aura of secrecy surrounding the nuclear industry – and by the implications of the Gaia hypothesis of environmentalist James Lovelock; these combined to him writing a thriller that mingled real world concerns with mythic and mystical elements. Kennedy Martin's original ending was more fantastic than that eventually used in the finished serial: he had proposed that Craven would turn into a tree but this was vetoed by members of the cast and crew.

First broadcast on BBC2, Edge of Darkness was met with such widespread critical acclaim that within days it had earned a repeat screening on BBC1. Winner of several prestigious awards, it remains highly regarded, often cited as one of the best and most influential pieces of British television drama. 25 years later, a film remake was released, set in the United States, which was directed by the original series director Martin Campbell and starring Mel Gibson.

== Plot ==
=== One: Compassionate Leave ===
Bob Peck as Ronald Craven in Edge of Darkness

Yorkshire police officer Ronald Craven is returning home with his daughter Emma having picked her up from a meeting of an environmental organisation at her university campus. On the doorstep of their home Emma is shot dead. The police concentrate their effort on the theory that her murder was a botched attempt on Craven's life by a criminal he had been responsible for convicting. However, as Craven goes through Emma's belongings, he discovers a geiger counter, a vibrator and a gun. He also learns that Emma's body and her possessions are radioactive. Travelling to London to assist with the inquiry, he is contacted by Pendleton, a polished official "attached to the Prime Minister's office", who informs him that Emma was known to them as a terrorist and that she may have been the gunman's target. (Aired 4 November 1985).

=== Two: Into The Shadows ===
As he continues his investigations, Craven is visited by Emma's ghost. The fingerprints on the getaway car used by Emma's killer match those of Lowe, a man Craven arrested 10 years ago. Pendleton takes Craven to meet his colleague, Harcourt, who informs him that Emma was a member of a subversive anti-nuclear group called Gaia. A team of six Gaia members, led by Emma, had broken into a low level radioactive waste facility at Northmoor; all are now either dead or missing. After Craven makes a televised appeal for information about Emma's killer, he is contacted by Central Intelligence Agency (CIA) agent Darius Jedburgh, an associate of Harcourt and Pendleton. Jedburgh shows Craven the CIA's file on Emma's activities: Gaia had become suspicious of Northmoor when a nearby reservoir had become contaminated with radioactive material, an occurrence that had also alerted the CIA, leading them to believe Northmoor was illegally storing plutonium. Jedburgh is played as a hard-bitten professional with a wry sense of humour and a passion for both golf and watching ballroom dancing on television. Along with Harcourt and Pendleton, he is keen to find the source and purpose of the plutonium. (Aired 11 November 1985).

=== Three: Burden of Proof ===
The police close in on their suspect, Lowe, who is severely injured in a fall while trying to escape. Dying, he tells Craven he was working with McCroon, a terrorist Craven had convicted in Northern Ireland. Emma's boyfriend, Terry Shields, tells Craven that she was investigating a hot cell in Northmoor; he is later killed. Craven meets Harcourt and Pendleton at the House of Commons. There, an inquiry is taking place into the sale of International Irradiated Fuels (IIF) at Northmoor, run by Robert Bennett to the Fusion Corporation of Kansas, owned by Jerry Grogan. Pendleton tells Craven that he believes Bennett was behind Emma's death. Returning to Yorkshire for Emma's funeral, Craven is refused permission to seek a warrant to enter Northmoor. Returning home, he is observed by McCroon. (Aired 18 November 1985).

=== Four: Breakthrough ===
McCroon breaks into Craven's house intent on killing him. Craven demands that McCroon tell him for whom he is working but McCroon is shot by a police marksman before he can say anything. Through a contact of Mac (Struan Roger), a colleague from his time in Northern Ireland, Craven gains access to a terminal connected to the MI5 computer. He checks the MI5 records for Gaia, Northmoor and Emma and learns that McCroon was acting on the orders of Northmoor Security. He also obtains a three-dimensional map of Northmoor from the computer. Craven contacts Jedburgh and asks him to accompany him inside Northmoor. (Aired 25 November 1985).

=== Five: Northmoor ===
Craven and Jedburgh penetrate Northmoor and discover the hot cell which has been sealed off following an explosion – a consequence of Gaia's attempted break-in. Jedburgh, under orders from the CIA, enters the hot cell and steals the plutonium. At the House of Commons inquiry, IIF chief executive Robert Bennett admits to the presence of plutonium at Northmoor. Further, he admits to deliberately causing the deaths by drowning of the Gaia team to prevent them from removing plutonium from the site. He justifies both the deaths, and the failure to report to any regulatory body, by stating that the plutonium was the property of the Ministry of Defence. (Aired 2 December 1985).

=== Six: Fusion ===
Craven and Jedburgh escape Northmoor but both are dying from acute radiation syndrome. Jedburgh makes for the Gleneagles Hotel in Scotland, which is hosting a NATO conference on directed energy weapons.

In London, Harcourt advises his Minister that Northmoor has been illegally producing plutonium. The Minister counters that Northmoor was doing so for the Ministry of Defence via an experimental method and was therefore exempt from normal regulation, and that he had been aware since the start of the secret program. Harcourt's involvement was intended only as a deception to allay American suspicions.

Arriving late at the conference is Grogan, who announces that the British government has approved his company's purchase of IIF and speaks with cold passion of harnessing the power of the atom. The audience of military and civilian officials applauds but Jedburgh, in a U.S. Army uniform, takes the dais to denounce nuclear proliferation. He finishes by bringing together two bars of plutonium he has removed from Northmoor, causing a criticality and irradiating himself and the nearby Grogan.

Emma's ghost appears to Craven and tells him of a time when black flowers grew, warming the Earth and preventing life from becoming extinct. The black flowers have returned and will melt the polar icecaps, destroying mankind so that life can continue. Craven goes to dissuade Jedburgh from the next step in his plan, which is to cause a nuclear explosion in Scotland with the rest of the plutonium. He succeeds, though the secret service trace Craven's call to Pendleton alerting him to the location of the rest of the plutonium, and kill Jedburgh. The next morning Craven, who like Jedburgh and Grogan has been fatally exposed to radiation, watches from a ridge above a loch as the plutonium is recovered, before finally calling Emma's name. Grogan is dying from ARS. Later, on the mountains, as Emma predicted, black flowers are growing, foreshadowing the planet's defensive war against humanity. (Aired 9 December 1985).

== Principal credits ==
=== Cast ===
- Bob Peck as Ronald Craven: Peck was well known in theatre but, at the time he was cast as Craven, had appeared in only minor roles on television. In creating the role of Craven, Peck drew upon his experience gained from the two years he played the title role in Macbeth for the Royal Shakespeare Company. Notable roles after Edge of Darkness included On the Black Hill (1987), Slipstream (1989), Natural Lies (1992) and Jurassic Park (1993). He died in 1999.
- Joanne Whalley as Emma Craven: Whalley began acting during childhood, first appearing in the long-running soap opera Coronation Street (1960–present) in 1974 at the age of 13, and eight years later had a small part in Alan Parker's music-drama Pink Floyd – The Wall. She had also appeared in supporting roles in several series including Juliet Bravo (1980–1985), Bergerac (1981–1991) and Reilly, Ace of Spies (1983). Following Edge of Darkness, Whalley was cast in the equally well regarded BBC television serial The Singing Detective (1986), written by Dennis Potter. Moving to Hollywood, she appeared in such films as Willow (1988), Scandal (1989) and Shattered (1991) as well as television mini-series such as Scarlett (1994) and Jackie Bouvier Kennedy Onassis (2000). During her eight-year marriage to the actor Val Kilmer, between 1988 and 1996, she was often credited as Joanne Whalley-Kilmer.
- Joe Don Baker as Darius Jedburgh: Baker had been acting since the 1960s and was known for his roles in Westerns such as Gunsmoke (1955–1975) and as the lead in the detective series Eischied (1979–1980). He also starred as Sheriff Buford Pusser in the original 1972 film Walking Tall. The script of Edge of Darkness so impressed him that he agreed to take the part at lower than his usual fee. He was later cast, by Edge of Darkness director Martin Campbell, as CIA agent Jack Wade in the James Bond film GoldenEye (1995), a role he reprised in Tomorrow Never Dies (1997). Baker died in May 2025.
- Charles Kay as Pendleton: Kay was a well established character actor who had appeared in Fall of Eagles (1974), I, Claudius (1976) and The Devil's Crown (1978). He has since acted in many television productions such as Fortunes of War (1989), The Darling Buds of May (1991–1993), Jonathan Creek (1997–2004) and Midsomer Murders (1998 and 2006). Kay died on 8 January 2025, at the age of 94.
- Ian McNeice as Harcourt: Edge of Darkness was an early role for McNeice. He went on to act in a wide variety of film and television parts including The Englishman Who Went up a Hill but Came down a Mountain (1995), Ace Ventura: When Nature Calls (1995) and Frank Herbert's Dune (2000), as well as regular roles in Doc Martin (2004–2022), Rome (2005–2007) and regular appearances as Winston Churchill in the BBC's revived Doctor Who.

Several other faces familiar to British viewers appeared during the course of the episodes, including John Woodvine (as Craven's superior DCS Ross), Tim McInnerny (as Emma's boyfriend Terry Shields), Hugh Fraser (as IIF chief executive Robert Bennett), Kenneth Nelson as Grogan, Zoë Wanamaker (as intelligence agent Clementine), Allan Cuthbertson (as Chilwell of the Investigation Committee) and Blake's 7 cast members David Jackson (as Colonel Lawson), Jack Watson as James Godbolt and Brian Croucher (as Northmoor security chief Connors). Playing themselves were television reporters Sue Cook and Kenneth Kendall, weatherman Bill Giles and Labour MP Michael Meacher. Long-standing BBC visual effects designer Mat Irvine, who contributed visual effects to the series, received a brief cameo as a police diver in "Breakthrough".

=== Crew ===
- Writer Troy Kennedy Martin was the creator of the long-running BBC police drama Z-Cars (1962–1978). He also wrote the screenplays for the films The Italian Job (1969) and Kelly's Heroes (1970) and scripts for television series such as Colditz (1972–1974), The Sweeney (1975–1978) (which was created by his brother Ian Kennedy Martin) and Reilly, Ace of Spies (1983). Following Edge of Darkness, he wrote the screenplays for the films Red Heat (with Walter Hill) (1988) and Bravo Two Zero (1999). He died in September 2009.
- Director Martin Campbell had developed a reputation for handling action thrillers with credits including The Professionals (1977–1983), Minder (1979–1994) and Shoestring (1979–1980). A few years after Edge of Darkness, Campbell moved into feature films, directing the James Bond films GoldenEye (1995) and Casino Royale (2006) as well as The Mask of Zorro (1998), Vertical Limit (2000) and The Legend of Zorro (2005).
- Producer Michael Wearing had worked on Play for Today for which he had produced Alan Bleasdale's The Black Stuff (1978) and which he and Bleasdale subsequently spun off into the highly acclaimed Boys from the Blackstuff (1982). He also produced the conspiracy thriller Bird of Prey (1982). Following Edge of Darkness he continued to be one of British television's most high profile and successful producers, appointed Head of Serials at the BBC between 1989 and 1998 where he was responsible for such programmes as Pride and Prejudice (1995), Our Friends in the North (1996) and Dennis Potter's final two plays Karaoke (1996) and Cold Lazarus (1996).
- Walt Patterson, who acted as series adviser, was a leading commentator on nuclear affairs, best known for his book Nuclear Power (Penguin, 1976–1986). Following Edge of Darkness, he acted as specialist adviser to the British House of Commons Select committee on Environment for their 1986 study, Radioactive Waste. He continues to contribute to the policy debate about energy and environmental issues. Advice on the policing aspects of the serial was provided by the West Yorkshire Police and former Scotland Yard detective Jack Slipper, famous for his pursuit of the train robber Ronnie Biggs.

=== Music ===
The musical score was provided by Eric Clapton and Michael Kamen. Clapton was approached to provide the score by producer Michael Wearing. Shortly afterwards, when Michael Kamen brought Clapton to a screening of Brazil (1985), which Kamen had scored, Clapton suggested a collaboration between the two on Edge of Darkness. Kamen became one of Hollywood's most successful film composers, writing the scores for many blockbuster films including the Lethal Weapon series (1987–1998) (also with Clapton), the first three Die Hard films (1988, 1990, 1995), Robin Hood: Prince of Thieves (1991) and X-Men (2000). He died in 2003.

Aside from the Clapton/Kamen soundtrack, Willie Nelson's "The Time of the Preacher", New Model Army's "Christian Militia", and Tom Waits' "16 Shells From A Thirty-Ought-Six" are featured in the series. "Christian Militia" is on the record player when Terry's body is found. Craven listens to "The Time of the Preacher" when he is in Emma's room in the first episode. It later emerges Jedburgh is familiar with the song and both he and Craven sing it on two occasions, the lyrics being significant.

The Australian Broadcasting Corporation used the music to illustrate stories on the Chernobyl disaster the following year. Eric Clapton and Michael Kamen performed the movie's main theme with the National Philharmonic Orchestra during the 24 Nights period in 1990 and 1991.

== Background ==
=== Origins ===
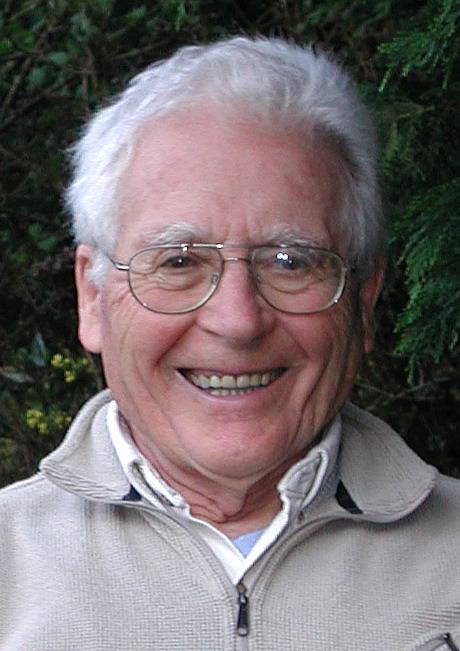
James Lovelock (seen here in a photo from 2005) developed the Gaia hypothesis that is important to the plot

"I am writing this story about a detective who turns into a tree" was what writer Troy Kennedy Martin told his colleagues when asked what he was working on during the early 1980s. Kennedy Martin had become frustrated that "at the BBC there was no political dimension to their drama whatsoever" but had chosen to write a political story anyway, not really believing it would be made. The election of Margaret Thatcher as Prime Minister and Ronald Reagan as President of the United States had brought about a major shift in the global political landscape. Kennedy Martin was motivated to write out of concern arising from such issues as the Greenham Common protests, the Falklands War, the Miners' strike and arising out of the escalation of the Cold War the fear that "born-again Christians and Cold War warriors appeared to be running the United States".

By 1983, Kennedy Martin had written the first draft of what became Edge of Darkness – at this stage it was called Magnox (a reference to the Magnox type of nuclear reactor) and was about trade union problems in the nuclear industry. The script was given to BBC head of drama series and serials, Jonathan Powell, who encouraged Kennedy Martin to continue its development. The script went through many changes and revisions. A particular influence was the speech made by President Ronald Reagan on 23 March 1983 announcing the Strategic Defense Initiative (SDI) which proposed protecting the United States from attack by nuclear missiles. One of the supporters of SDI was Lyndon LaRouche, on whom Kennedy Martin based the character of Jerry Grogan, owner of the Fusion Corporation of Kansas. Kennedy Martin was also influenced by the secrecy surrounding the UK's policy on nuclear power in light of the inquiry into the construction of the Sizewell B nuclear power station and the concerns about the safety record of the Sellafield nuclear reprocessing plant; this led him to conceive International Irradiated Fuels and its chief executive Robert Bennett.

The other major influence was the Gaia hypothesis, that the Earth is a single living system that self-regulates to maintain the optimum conditions for life, formulated by climate scientist James Lovelock and popularised in his 1979 book Gaia: A new look at life on Earth. Kennedy Martin used the name Gaia for the environmental organisation Emma Craven was involved in and drew the notion for the black flowers seen at the serial's conclusion from a passage in Lovelock's book that describes a dark marsh grass that grew on the surface of the Earth trapping heat during a time when the planet was too cold to sustain life, simulated in Lovelock's Daisyworld model.

Although Kennedy Martin's notion for the serial was influenced by real political events, he had for a long time railed against naturalism in television drama – most notably in a 1964 article for the theatre magazine Encore, titled "Nats Go Home. First Statement of a New Drama for Television", in which he sought "to free the camera from photographing dialogue, to free the structure from natural time and to exploit the total and absolute objectivity of the television camera". Edge of Darkness producer Michael Wearing has noted that "there is a mystical dimension to Troy's imagination. His instincts are visual and non-naturalistic". Kennedy Martin, therefore, crafted a serial that on the one hand placed its events squarely within the real, present day world but on the other also placed itself within the realm of the mystical and the mythic. Realism and authenticity was provided by the appearances of real life television presenter Sue Cook and Labour MP Michael Meacher. There was also use of contemporary stock footage, such as Robin Day's interview with Margaret Thatcher and references to real persons like Michael Heseltine and places such as Sellafield, alongside the references to fictitious characters and places contained in the plot. The mystical dimension is provided by Emma's ghost while the mythic is provided by Craven himself and by Jedburgh and Grogan. Kennedy Martin, influenced by John Darragh's The Real Camelot (Thames and Hudson, 1981) which examined the pagan origins of the Arthurian legend, saw Craven as a modern-day Green Man who would confront the threats to the Earth on behalf of Gaia. Jedburgh was conceived by Kennedy Martin as a Knight of the Marches, one of the Teutonic Knights who defended the borders of Eastern Europe, opposed to Grogan, who Kennedy Martin saw as a descendant of the Knights Templar who, according to legend, had guarded a special wisdom in the Temple of the Dome of the Rock in Jerusalem. These aspects would reach their apotheosis in the serial's conclusion in which Kennedy Martin envisaged that Craven, having found the plutonium stolen by Jedburgh, would be shot by a sniper and would be transformed into a tree.

=== Production ===
By 1983, Jonathan Powell was keen to put the serial into production and offered the scripts to producer Michael Wearing who was immediately impressed by the scenes in the first episode, "Compassionate Leave", depicting Craven's reaction to Emma's death, describing them as "the most sustained evocation of individual grief in bereavement that I can remember". The budget was set at £2 million, of which £400,000 came from an American co-producer, Lionheart Television International. Director Martin Campbell came on board shortly afterwards and soon clashed with Troy Kennedy Martin, demanding rewrites, in particular to the notion that Craven had known about Emma's involvement with Gaia right from the start; this was removed at Campbell's behest. Further clashes over the script occurred between Kennedy Martin and star Bob Peck over the conclusion in which his character would turn into a tree; Peck recalled that "it didn't seem to be working in script terms, it seemed as though we wouldn't be able to make it work for the audience", a view echoed by Michael Wearing who felt that it was "likely not to come off as an effect". Kennedy Martin capitulated, introducing instead the concept of the black flowers seen in the finished production. However, some elements of Kennedy Martin's original vision persist in the final script: for example, in episode three, "Burden of Proof", the ghost of Emma urges Craven, as he undergoes a breakdown, to be strong, like a tree.

Shooting on Edge of Darkness began on 9 July 1984 and ran for five months until 5 December 1984. Location filming took place in London (including the Barbican Arts Centre, BBC Television Centre and the Hilton International hotel in Holland Park), Yorkshire (including the headquarters of the West Yorkshire Police in Bradford, the Middleton Railway, the headquarters of Systime Computers (now the Arlington Business Centre) in Leeds where Craven hacks into the MI5 computer and at Westwood Cottage, Ilkley (for Craven's home), Scotland (including the Gleneagles Hotel, where Jedburgh addresses the NATO conference and also where President Reagan's Reykjavík policy was formulated) and Wales (including Clogau Gold Mine and Manod, Blaenau Ffestiniog, at Graig Ddu quarry, doubling as Northmoor with the hot cell a set constructed at a factory in Penygroes). The hospital scenes were filmed at Northwick Park Hospital accident unit.

Throughout the entire shoot, the production continued to be known as Magnox; the title Dark Forces was briefly considered before the serial was renamed Edge of Darkness in April 1985. As the shoot progressed it became apparent to the cast and crew that they had a potential hit on their hands; Bob Peck recalled, "I think we knew when we were making it that it was a good piece of work" while Kennedy Martin told reporters "I haven't had this feeling about something for 20 years. It's wonderful, after all this time, to get something that actually works".

== Broadcast and critical reception ==
Edge of Darkness was promoted on the cover of the listings magazine Radio Times and was broadcast on Monday nights on BBC2 at 9:30pm, beginning 4 November 1985. The serial averaged an audience of 4 million viewers over its run. The critical response was generally positive with most commentators concentrating their praise on Peck's performance as Craven and the scale of the programme's political themes. "A good television thriller is very hard to find but Edge of Darkness promises to be one of the best", wrote Celia Brayfield in The Times, "The central character is played by Bob Peck, who has the gift of looking tragic and intelligent simultaneously. [...] There was humour to lift the gloom and superb characterisation to flesh out the stock situation". Ruth Baumgarten, in The Listener, praised the serial as "a grandiosely ambitious and compelling piece of fiction". Speaking on the BBC's review programme Did You See...?, the writer Sarah Dunant said, "this is a very classy piece of television drama, on all levels, I think on the plot level, I think on the level of emotion and I think stylistically [...] it looks absolutely wonderful, it's shot like a feature film". Not so impressed was Byron Rogers, television critic of The Sunday Times, who initially hailed the series as one that "stayed in the mind and will stay there long [...] because of its portrayal of human grief" but later felt he was "beginning to find Edge of Darkness slightly irritating" and decried the final episode as "an insult to its considerable following".

Aware of the critical buzz surrounding the show, BBC1 Controller, Michael Grade, quickly announced that the series would be repeated on BBC1, stating, "I think it will reach a wider audience and it deserves it", and so Edge of Darkness was duly shown, in double episodes, over three consecutive nights between 19 December and 21 December 1985, the fastest time between original broadcast and repeat in the BBC's history. These repeats were accompanied by a disclaimer that the Gaia organisation depicted in the programme was not connected with the Gaia publishing company supported by Prince Philip. The disclaimer was hidden on the BBC DVD release as an easter egg. It was a move that paid off – Edge of Darkness doubled its audience on BBC1 to eight million viewers.

== Cultural significance ==
Edge of Darkness tapped into a cultural zeitgeist of concern about nuclear power and nuclear warfare in the early to mid 1980s. In 1980, current affairs programme Panorama broadcast "If The Bomb Drops", a documentary that examined how well prepared Britain was for a nuclear attack; in 1983, The Day After (an American TV movie about a nuclear war) aired, as well as seeing the release of the feature film WarGames, showing the 'no winner' outcome of nuclear war; in 1984, the BBC broadcast On the Eighth Day, a documentary about the effects of a nuclear winter and Threads, a drama about a nuclear attack on Sheffield while 1985 saw the first screening of Peter Watkins' nuclear war television film The War Game, banned on television since 1965. Edge of Darkness also rode on a wave of preoccupation with the secretive nature of the State in both fact (e.g. This Week's "Death on the Rock" (1988) about the killing of three Provisional IRA members in Gibraltar and Secret Society (1987) about undisclosed matters of public interest which led to the sacking of BBC Director-General Alasdair Milne) and fiction (e.g. the films Defence of the Realm (1985) and The Whistle Blower (1987) and the television serials A Very British Coup (1988) and Traffik (1989)).

Edge of Darkness continues to be well regarded to this day. When it was repeated on BBC2 in 1992, Sean Day-Lewis wrote in The Daily Telegraph, "Edge of Darkness is a masterpiece. It is one of those very rare television creations so rich in form and content that the spectator wishes there was some way of prolonging it indefinitely". Andrew Lavender, writing in British Television Drama in the 1980s, has said that Edge of Darkness "captured the spirit of its age but went far beyond the drama of its time. [...] It pushed against expectations attaching to the thriller form, often transcending the limits of the genre". Fred Inglis, in his analysis of the serial in Formations: 20th Century Media Studies, takes it "as one of the most remarkable works of art made for British television". According to Lez Cooke, in British Television Drama: A History, "In a reactionary climate, when the possibilities for the production of 'social issue' drama were limited, Edge of Darkness proved that, by adapting to changed circumstances and adopting a serialised thriller format, it was still possible to produce ambitious and progressive television drama in Britain in the mid-1980s", a view echoed by Sean Cubit in EcoMedia who notes that "the series neatly echoed the chill that descended on radical politics in the Thatcher years in the United Kingdom". The television historian Andrew Pixley has described the series as "possibly the finest BBC drama ever made" and "one of the few television programmes where every element can be said to have worked to complete effect"; John Hartley, in Tele-ology: Studies in Television, called it "the best police drama series ever made for television" and said that "its method of investigative drama can unravel some of the complexities of public life more truthfully than investigative journalism".

Edge of Darkness was placed 15th (fourth position out of the dramas featured on the list) on the British Film Institute's list of the 100 Greatest British Television Programmes in 2000, the BFI describing it as "a gripping, innovative six-part drama which fully deserves its cult status and many awards". Radio Times television editor Alison Graham, in 2003, listed it as one of the 40 greatest television programmes ever made. It was one of only seven dramas listed in Broadcast magazine's list of the 50 most influential television programmes, published in July 2004. In March 2007, Edge of Darkness was placed third in Channel 4's list of the Greatest TV Dramas. Also on Channel 4, Darius Jedburgh was listed 84th in its list of the One Hundred Greatest TV Characters in 2001.

== Awards ==
Edge of Darkness received eleven nominations and won six awards at the 1986 BAFTA Awards:

- Won: Best Drama Series or Serial (Martin Campbell & Michael Wearing)
- Won: Best Actor (Bob Peck).
- Nominated: Best Actor (Joe Don Baker).
- Nominated: Best Actress (Joanne Whalley).
- Won: Best Original Television Music (Eric Clapton & Michael Kamen).
- Won: Best Film Cameraman (Andrew Dunn).
- Won: Best Film Editor (Ardan Fisher, Dan Rae).
- Won: Best Film Sound (Dickie Bird, Rob James, Christopher Swanton, Tony Quinn).
- Nominated: Best Makeup (Daphne Croker).
- Nominated: Best Graphics (Andy Coward, Linda Sherwood-Page).
- Nominated: Best Design (Graeme Thompson).

At the 1986 Broadcasting Press Guild television critics' awards, Edge of Darkness won two awards:

- Won: Best Actor (Bob Peck) (joint winner with Ben Kingsley for Silas Marner).
- Nominated: Best Actor (Joe Don Baker).
- Won: Best Drama Series.

== Hollywood adaptation ==
In 2010, a Hollywood reworking of the show as an action drama was released in cinemas. It was released on 28 January in the UK, 29 January in the US and 4 February in Australia. Mel Gibson plays Detective Craven. The film is directed by Martin Campbell, who also directed the original.

== Home media ==
Edge of Darkness was released on VHS videotape by the BBC in 1987. There was also a release from CBS/Fox Video in North America at the same time. The serial was also released as a two-tape set by Warner Home Video in Germany under the title Die Plutonium Affäre. The soundtrack was also released as an album entitled Edge of Darkness.

The serial was re-issued on VHS in 1998 by Revelation Films who also issued the serial on DVD in 1999. In 2003, BBC Worldwide re-issued Edge of Darkness on DVD (encoded for both regions 2 and 4) with several extra features including Magnox: The Secrets of Edge of Darkness, a specially made "making-of" documentary; an isolated soundtrack of Eric Clapton and Michael Kamen's score; a Bob Peck interview from BBC Breakfast Time; a contemporary report on the programme's BAFTA wins and coverage of the programme's wins at the Broadcasting Press Guild awards. A Region 1 DVD set was released on 3 November 2009.

The serial was released by the BBC in HD on Blu-ray on 4 Nov 2019, remastered from the original 16mm film.

== Other media ==
Troy Kennedy Martin's original script for episode one and the final scripts for episodes two to six of the serial were published by Faber and Faber in 1990; the script book also included an introduction by Kennedy Martin and two appendices – the first giving background to the story and the main characters and the second giving comments on the script by experts on nuclear power and police procedures.

== See also ==
- Gaia hypothesis

Awards
Preceded by The Jewel in the Crown	British Academy Television Awards; Best Drama Series or Serial; 1986	Succeeded by The Life and Loves of a She-Devil
