= Double Dare (Play for Today) =

- Play for Today episode
- Title screen with Kika Markham
- Episode no.: Series 6 Episode 24
- Directed by: John Mackenzie
- Written by: Dennis Potter
- Original air date: 6 April 1976

Episode chronology
← Previous "Early Struggles"	Next → "Bar Mitzvah Boy"

"Double Dare" is the 24th episode of sixth series of the British BBC anthology TV series Play for Today. The episode was a television play that was originally broadcast on 6 April 1976. "Double Dare" was written by Dennis Potter, directed by John Mackenzie, produced by Kenith Trodd, and starred Alan Dobie.

"Double Dare" explores the link between author and viewer, one of Potter's major themes, and is referenced several times in his later work. The play's title is taken from the 1938 Al Bowlly song "I Double Dare You", which is featured in both the opening and closing credits.

== Synopsis ==
Martin Ellis (Dobie) is a blocked screenwriter who invites Helen, an actress (Markham), to a hotel in central London to discuss an idea for a play he is writing with her in mind. As he waits for her to arrive he picks up the telephone in his room and considers calling an escort agency. Thinking better of it, he decides to call his wife instead. He goes to meet Helen at the hotel bar and they start discussing his project. He explains that the play he intends to write involves a meeting between a businessman and a call girl at a hotel; Martin's intention is to explore the tension this scenario would create by talking to Helen about how far she would go for the sake of her profession. As they discuss the play, Martin discovers that a businessman and an escort named Carol are sat at a nearby table and appear to be speaking lines from the as yet unwritten piece. Martin becomes anxious at what will eventually become of the girl, already knowing that the play will not have a happy resolution. As Helen becomes uncomfortable and is about to leave, Martin's agent Ben (Melia) arrives to make sure that the meeting is going as planned. Angry at having been set up for Martin to seduce her, Helen calls Ben a pimp, which leads him to reveal that Martin is actually in love with her. After Ben leaves, Helen informs Martin that there is no possibility of a romantic attachment happening between them and asks to collect her belongings from his room; all the while Martin remains fixated on the businessman and the call girl on the other table. When they head up to Martin's room, so do the characters who appear to have escaped from Martin's play. As Helen bids Martin goodnight he claims to hear shouting from next door: the businessman is in there with the escort girl and has become violent at her sexual taunting. Martin stands against the wall and describes the businessman raping and murdering her. When it is over he turns to face Helen on the bed, only to find that she has been sexually assaulted and strangled — seemingly at his hand. There is a knock at the door. Martin answers it only to be confronted by the businessman, who it is revealed is actually a mild-mannered and married man concerned by the noise coming from Martin's room. Martin tells him to mind his own business and slams the door. He walks over to the bedside table, picks up the telephone and calls the escort agency. When there is no reply, he lies back on the bed next to Helen's body and weeps.

=== Principal cast ===
- Alan Dobie as Martin Ellis
- Kika Markham as Helen/Carol
- Malcolm Terris as Businessman
- Joe Melia as Ben
- John Hamill as Peter
- Linda Beckett as the businessman's wife

== Production ==
In 1974, Potter's father died, and this, coupled with a severe bout of psoriatic arthropathy, led to him developing writer's block. Having the bare bones of an idea about a meeting between a businessman and a prostitute for his next piece, Potter contacted producer Kenith Trodd to arrange a meeting with actress Kika Markham, hoping to cast her in one of his own television productions. The two met in a hotel at The Strand and began discussing their relative professions. Markham has said much of the dialogue featured in the play was a faithful transcript of their meeting.

According to Markham, early rehearsals were spent trying to "wring the giggles" out of the material; Potter's very specific stage directions appearing overwrought compared to the 'clipped-down' style of other writers. Having broken this barrier, the performers were able to explore the darker context of the play through close reading of the text and various theatrical exercises. As the production would be shot on location, director John Mackenzie was granted the opportunity of using film stock rather than video.

== Themes ==
"Double Dare" explores the relationship between fact and fiction, as well as the connection between author and viewer. The doubling up of Helen and the call girl, and to a lesser extent the comparisons between Martin and the businessman, are "Potteresque" tropes that serve to challenge the audience's perspective on what they are seeing. Dialogue between Martin and Helen is often repeated verbatim in the fictional world of the businessman and the call girl (most notably the exchange about the automatic shoe polisher in the hallway outside Martin's room, which bookends Helen's arrival at the hotel and the escort heading to her client's room). Although containing very few of the non-naturalistic flourishes of his other plays, "Double Dare" does, however, contain one sequence where Potter deliberately breaks the artificial naturalism of the drama by having Martin question Helen if she would sleep with him if they were characters in a play before turning direct to camera and indicating an audience "somewhere out there". This question, and others like it, forms the basis of one of Potter's other major themes – individual choice in the face of an omniscient author. While Martin assumes responsibility for the eventual fate of the call girl, even going so far as attempting to warn her of the danger she faces, he ultimately resigns himself to the view that the act of writing is nothing more than a form of precognition. Martin recites Dante Gabriel Rossetti's poem "Sudden Light" (c.1853-4) to Helen in an attempt to woo her, but emphasises the subtext that all things, even human relationships, are mapped out in advance by unseen forces.

== Broadcast and reception ==
The play was originally intended to be part of a trilogy exploring an individual's choices (or rather, lack of them) in the face of an omniscient narrator; "Double Dare" was to form the first part, followed by Brimstone and Treacle, also produced for the Play for Today slot, and Where Adam Stood — a free adaptation of Edmund Gosse's autobiographical book Father and Son (1907). The BBC's decision not to broadcast Brimstone caused some surprise from both Potter and Trodd, the latter assuming that if any of the trilogy would cause offence it would be "Double Dare", citing its "ferocious" attitude towards women as a potential problem. When the play went out on BBC1 on 6 April 1976, it attracted very positive reviews stating that Potter was maturing as a playwright.

Reviewing the play for The Guardian, Martin Amis praised the drama's build-up of tension, its Russian doll effect and commented that it forced him to "increase [my] nicotene intake." The sex scenes between Markham and John Hamill, included as a flashback from another play, intended to show the lengths to which Helen will go in the pursuit of her craft, were considered to be among the strongest shown on British television up to that point. The play would not be repeated until 2005, when it was shown on BBC Four amongst a season of programming intended to mark the tenth anniversary of Potter's death.

== Proposed film adaptation ==
When director Herbert Ross was preparing a film version of Pennies from Heaven for MGM, producer Rick McCallum drew his attention to "Double Dare" as a potential project to adapt for the cinema. Potter told editor Graham Fuller in Potter on Potter that he had written a movie adaptation that transferred the action to Los Angeles, and featured an English screenwriter whose experiences in Hollywood are 'doubled up' with those back home in England. Potter described this new version of the play as "more sexually disturbing" than the original, but after the box office failure of the movie version of Pennies from Heaven the project was shelved. Ross claimed, however, that he held a read-through with Robert De Niro and Al Pacino.

== Intertextuality ==
The central premise of "Double Dare" would be revisited in the serial Karaoke (1996), the first part of Potter's two last television works. Karaoke features a writer called Daniel Feeld (Albert Finney) who starts to hear lines from his latest screenplay coming from the mouths of total strangers and those closest to him. The centrepiece of the serial involves a sequence in a brasserie where Feeld, meeting with his producer (Anna Chancellor), overhears a young woman on the next table arguing with her boyfriend. Their conversation appears to consist of Daniel's dialogue and the young girl ("Sandra", played by Saffron Burrows) is being asked to have sex with one of her gangster boyfriend's business associates to broker a favour. The intercutting of the scene between Daniel and the girl's perspectives is largely identical to "Double Dare", as is the suggestion that the girl will meet a horrible fate if Daniel does not intervene. A minor reference to "Double Dare" is the fact that Daniel's literary agent (Roy Hudd) is also called Ben.

"Double Dare" is also a follow-on from an earlier Potter play, Follow the Yellow Brick Road (1972), which features an embittered, cuckolded actor ('Jack Black', played by Denholm Elliott) who believes himself to be an actor trapped in a television play. Unlike "Double Dare", however, the central protagonist is able to subvert the narrative by challenging its anonymous author.

== Sources ==
- Humphrey Carpenter, Dennis Potter: A Biography; 1998
- Graham Fuller (ed.), Potter on Potter; 1993
- W. Stephen Gilbert, Fight and Kick and Bite: The Life and Work of Dennis Potter; 1995
- Nigel Williams (ed.) Arena: Painting the Clouds; 2005
