= BFI TV 100 =

Best British TV shows

The BFI TV 100 is a list of 100 television programmes or series that was compiled in 2000 by the British Film Institute (BFI), as chosen by a poll of industry professionals, with the aim to determine the best British television programmes of any genre that had been screened up to that time.

== Selection and criteria ==
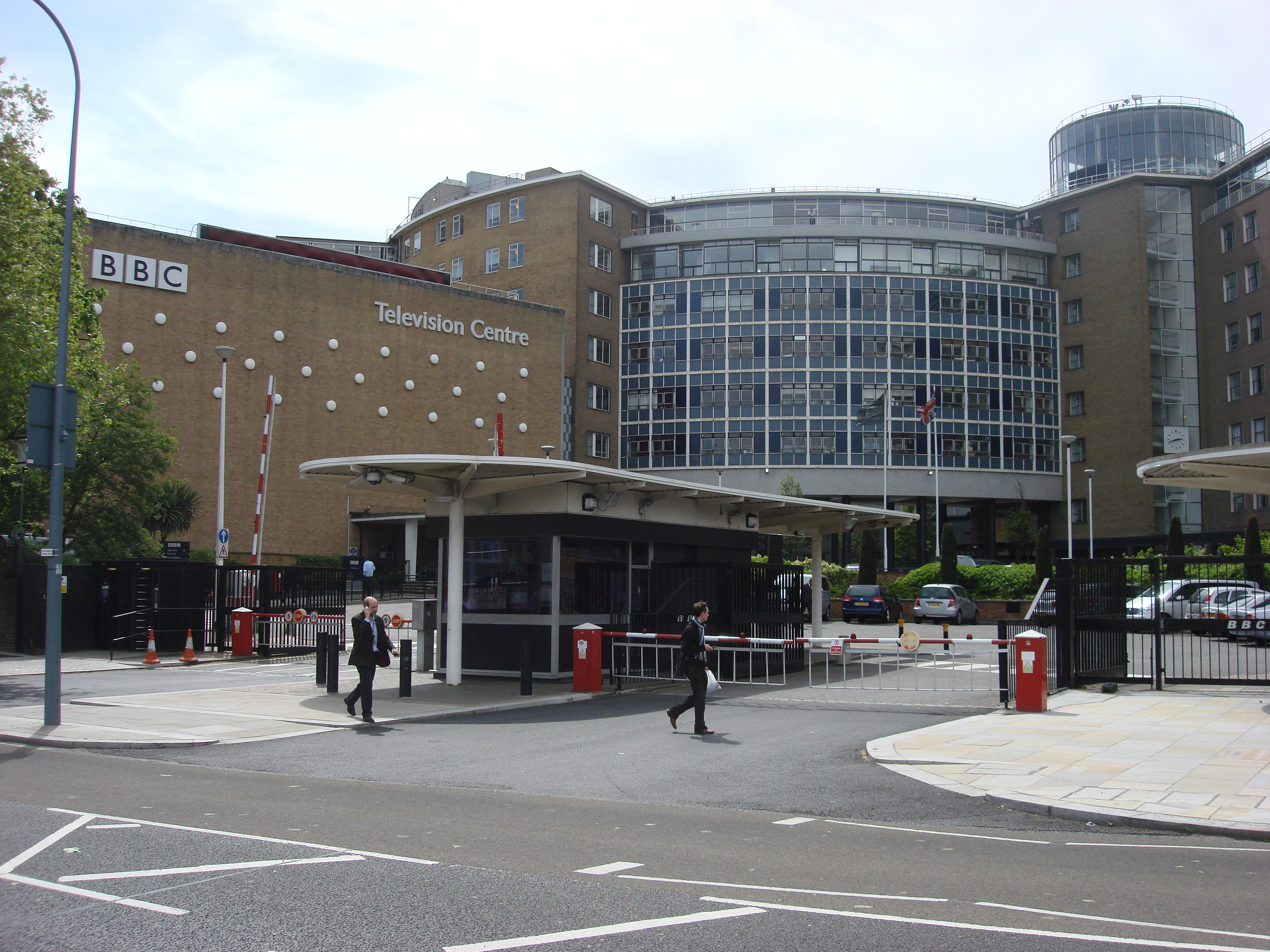
The BBC produced 70 of the 100 programmes on the list.

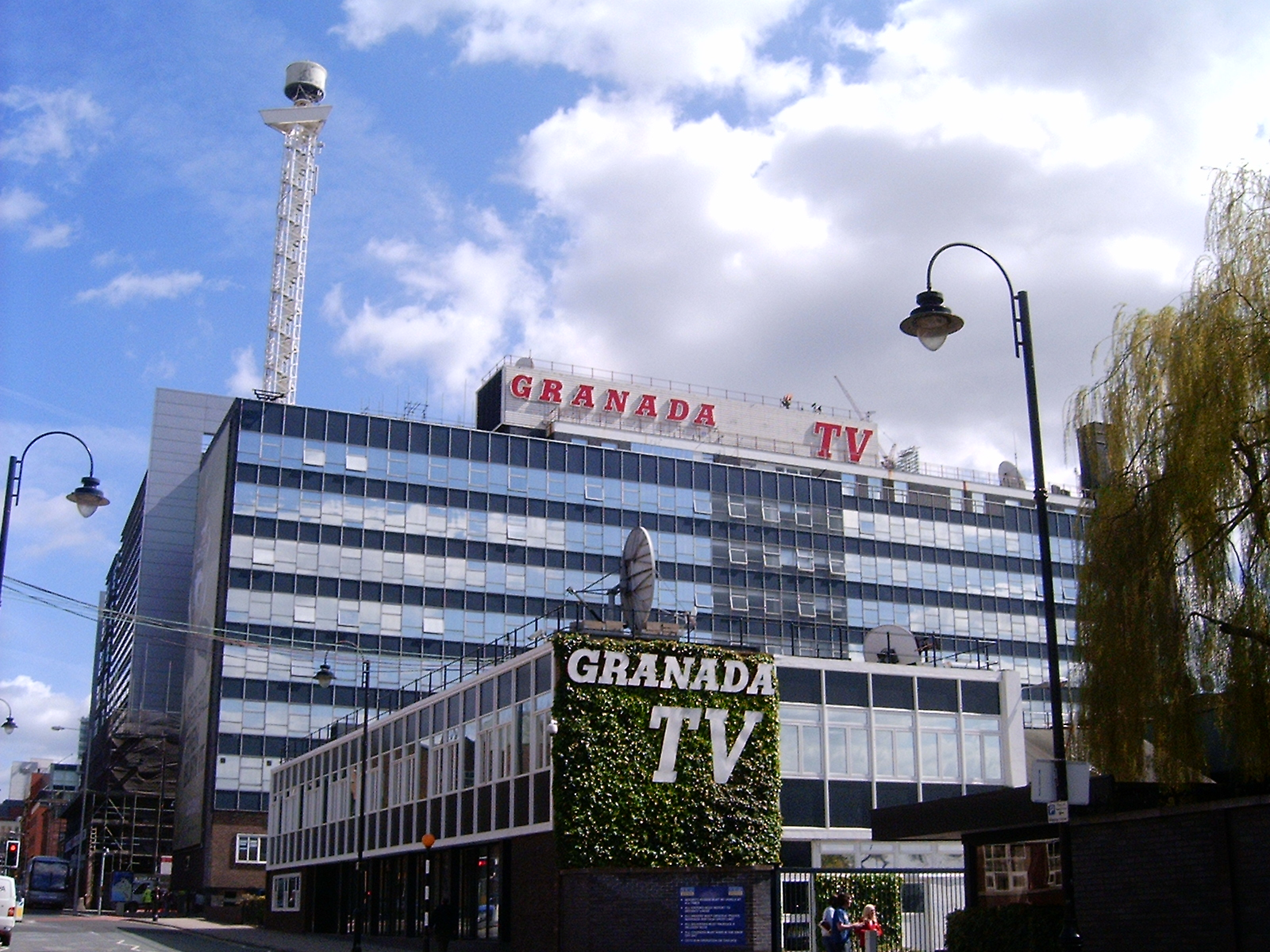
Granada Television produced 7 of the 100 programmes on list—the largest number by a commercial broadcaster.

The British Film Institute television programme poll was conducted in the year 2000, and its results are reflected in the list that appears in a following section. Initially, a 'big list' of 650 programmes was drawn up by BFI personnel. Television programmes no longer extant in the archives were excluded from consideration. The provisional list was split into six categories: Single Dramas, Drama Series and Serials, Comedy and Variety, Factual, Children's/Youth, and Lifestyle & Light Entertainment. Some programmes were represented in the list by an entire series; however, for some series—e.g., the anthology The Wednesday Play and the current affairs programme This Week—individual episodes were listed. News stories were mostly excluded, with exceptions such as the coverage of the death of Diana, Princess of Wales (on the basis that it would be impossible to determine whether it was the coverage or the news itself that made them important). Sport was excluded for similar reasons, and also because many events such as the 1966 World Cup, while important to those in England, would not necessarily matter to those in other areas of the UK.

The provisional list of 650 was then distributed to 1,600 television industry professionals in the UK, who were each given 30 votes. Each voter was required to cast a minimum of three votes in every category. The judges were also asked to name their top overseas programme (where the U.S. sitcom Frasier was chosen).

== List ==
The following are the results of the poll, as reported by the BFI and other sources. Because the list reports decisions made in the year 2000, programmes and series are presented as they were perceived in that year; as such, ones not yet having concluded by the year 2000 are presented as having an open-ended date span in the "Year(s)" column, even if they have subsequently ended. The Genre column, added to the original table, may have a lot of crossover genres and is intended as guide to the "main" genre of each programme.

No.	Title	Broadcast on	Year(s)	Genre
1	Fawlty Towers	BBC2	1975, 1979	Comedy and Variety
2	"Cathy Come Home" (The Wednesday Play)	BBC1	1966	Single Dramas
3	Doctor Who	BBC1	1963–1989, 1996	Children's/Youth
4	The Naked Civil Servant	ITV (Thames Television)	1975	Single Dramas
5	Monty Python's Flying Circus	BBC1 / BBC2	1969–1974	Comedy and Variety
6	Blue Peter	BBC1	1958–	Children's/Youth
7	Boys from the Blackstuff	BBC2	1982	Drama Series and Serials
8	Parkinson	BBC1	1971–1982, 1987–1988, 1998–	Lifestyle & Light Entertainment
9	Yes Minister / Yes, Prime Minister	BBC2	1980–1988	Comedy and Variety
10	Brideshead Revisited	ITV (Granada)	1981	Drama Series and Serials
11	Abigail's Party (Play for Today)	BBC1	1977	Single Dramas
12	I, Claudius	BBC2	1976	Drama Series and Serials
13	Dad's Army	BBC1	1968–1977	Comedy and Variety
14	The Morecambe & Wise Show	BBC2 / BBC1 / ITV (Thames)	1961–1983	Comedy and Variety
15	Edge of Darkness	BBC2	1985	Drama Series and Serials
16	Blackadder Goes Forth	BBC1	1989	Comedy and Variety
17	Absolutely Fabulous	BBC2 / BBC1	1992–1996	Comedy and Variety
18	The Wrong Trousers	BBC2	1993	Children's/Youth
19	The World at War	ITV (Thames)	1973–1974	Factual
20	The Singing Detective	BBC1	1986	Drama Series and Serials
21	Pennies from Heaven	BBC1	1978	Drama Series and Serials
22	The Jewel in the Crown	ITV (Granada)	1984	Drama Series and Serials
23	Who Wants to Be a Millionaire?	ITV	1998–	Lifestyle & Light Entertainment
24	Hancock's Half Hour	BBC	1956–1961	Comedy and Variety
25	Our Friends in the North	BBC2	1996	Drama Series and Serials
26	28 Up	ITV (Granada)	1985	Factual
27	The War Game	BBC1	1965	Single Dramas
28	The Magic Roundabout	BBC1	1965–1977	Children's/Youth
29	That Was the Week That Was	BBC	1962–1963	Comedy and Variety
30	An Englishman Abroad	BBC1	1983	Single Dramas
31	The Royle Family	BBC2/BBC1	1998–2012	Comedy and Variety
32	Life on Earth	BBC2	1979	Factual
33	The Old Grey Whistle Test	BBC2	1971–1987	Lifestyle & Light Entertainment
34	University Challenge	ITV (Granada) / BBC2	1961–1987, 1994–	Lifestyle & Light Entertainment
35	Porridge	BBC1	1974–1977	Comedy and Variety
36	"Blue Remembered Hills" (Play for Today)	BBC1	1979	Single Dramas
37	Mastermind (original format)	BBC1 / BBC2	1972–1997	Lifestyle & Light Entertainment
38	I'm Alan Partridge	BBC2	1997	Comedy and Variety
39	Cracker	ITV (Granada)	1993–1996	Drama Series and Serials
40	Coronation Street	ITV (Granada)	1960–	Drama Series and Serials
41	Top of the Pops	BBC1 / BBC2	1964–2006	Lifestyle & Light Entertainment
42	Inspector Morse	ITV (Central)	1987–2000	Drama Series and Serials
43	Grange Hill	BBC1	1978–2008	Children's/Youth
44	Steptoe and Son	BBC1	1962–1965, 1970–1974	Comedy and Variety
45	Only Fools and Horses	BBC1	1981–1996	Comedy and Variety
46	Auf Wiedersehen, Pet (series 1)	ITV (Central)	1983	Comedy and Variety
47	Tiswas	ITV (ATV)	1974–1982	Children's/Youth
48	Elgar	BBC	1962	Single Dramas
49	"Nuts in May" (Play for Today)	BBC1	1976	Single Dramas
50	Father Ted	Channel 4	1995–1998	Comedy and Variety
51	The Avengers	ITV (ABC)	1961–1969	Drama Series and Serials
52	Tinker Tailor Soldier Spy	BBC2	1979	Drama Series and Serials
53	The Forsyte Saga	BBC2	1967	Drama Series and Serials
54	Hillsborough	ITV (Granada)	1996	Single Dramas
55	Dennis Potter: The Last Interview (Without Walls Special)	Channel 4	1994	Factual
56	Bar Mitzvah Boy (Play for Today)	BBC1	1976	Single Dramas
57	"Edna, the Inebriate Woman" (Play for Today)	BBC1	1971	Single Dramas
58	Live Aid	BBC1 / BBC2	1985	Lifestyle & Light Entertainment
59	World In Action	ITV (Granada)	1963–1998	Factual
60	Thunderbirds	ITV (ATV)	1965–1966	Children's/Youth
61	Talking Heads / Talking Heads 2	BBC1 / BBC2	1988 / 1998	Drama Series and Serials
62	Ready Steady Go!	ITV (Rediffusion)	1963–1966	Lifestyle & Light Entertainment
63	Z-Cars	BBC1	1962–1978	Drama Series and Serials
64	Culloden	BBC1	1964	Single Dramas
65	The Ascent of Man	BBC2	1973	Factual
66	A Very British Coup	Channel 4	1988	Drama Series and Serials
67	Civilisation	BBC2	1969	Factual
68	Prime Suspect	ITV (Granada)	1991–2006	Drama Series and Serials
69	The Likely Lads / Whatever Happened to the Likely Lads?	BBC2 / BBC1	1964–1966 / 1973–1974	Comedy and Variety
70	Have I Got News for You	BBC2 / BBC1	1990–	Comedy and Variety
71	The Snowman	Channel 4	1982	Children's/Youth
72	Walking with Dinosaurs	BBC1	1999	Factual
73	Nineteen Eighty-Four	BBC	1954	Single Dramas
74	The Fall and Rise of Reginald Perrin	BBC1	1976–1979	Comedy and Variety
75	Quatermass and the Pit	BBC	1958–1959	Drama Series and Serials
76	Between the Lines	BBC1	1992–1994	Drama Series and Serials
77	Blind Date	ITV (LWT)	1985–	Lifestyle & Light Entertainment
78	Talking to a Stranger (Theatre 625)	BBC2	1966	Single Dramas
79	The Borrowers	BBC1	1992–1993	Children's/Youth
80	One Foot in the Grave	BBC1	1990–2000	Comedy and Variety
81	Later... with Jools Holland	BBC2	1992–	Lifestyle & Light Entertainment
82	Tutti Frutti	BBC2	1987	Drama Series and Serials
83	The Knowledge	ITV (Thames)	1979	Single Dramas
84	House of Cards	BBC1	1990	Drama Series and Serials
85	This Is Your Life	BBC1 / ITV (Thames)	1955–1964, 1969–	Lifestyle & Light Entertainment
86	The Tube	Channel 4	1982–1987	Lifestyle & Light Entertainment
87	The Death of Yugoslavia	BBC2	1995	Factual
88	Till Death Us Do Part	BBC1	1966–1975	Comedy and Variety
89	A Very Peculiar Practice	BBC1	1986–1992	Comedy and Variety
90	TV Nation	BBC2	1995	Factual
91	This Life	BBC2	1996–1997	Drama Series and Serials
92	"Death on the Rock" (This Week)	ITV (Thames)	1988	Factual
93	The Nazis: A Warning from History	BBC2	1997	Factual
94	Drop the Dead Donkey	Channel 4	1990–1998	Comedy and Variety
95	Arena	BBC2	1975–	Factual
96	The Railway Children	BBC1	1968	Children's/Youth
97	Teletubbies	BBC2	1997–	Children's/Youth
98	Spitting Image	ITV (Central)	1984–1996	Comedy and Variety
99	Pride and Prejudice	BBC1	1995	Drama Series and Serials
100	Made in Britain	ITV (Central)	1982	Single Dramas

BBC led broadcasters in terms of numbers of programmes/series produced, with 70. Granada Television was the second most represented with 7, and Thames Television and Channel 4 tied for third with 6 each. Central produced four of the listed titles, while ATV produced two, and London Weekend Television, ABC Weekend TV and Associated-Rediffusion produced one each.

== See also ==
- Britain's Best Sitcom
- 100 Greatest
- BFI Top 100 British films

== Further reading and viewing ==
- BFI Staff (4 March 2009). "The BFI TV 100: 1–100". London, UK: British Film Institute. Archived from the original on 11 September 2011.
- BBC News article regarding the list, and giving the first 20 on the list.
