= Blue Remembered Hills =

- Play for Today episode
- Episode no.: Series 9 Episode 14
- Directed by: Brian Gibson
- Written by: Dennis Potter
- Narrated by: Dennis Potter
- Original air date: 30 January 1979

"Blue Remembered Hills" is the 14th episode of the ninth season of the British BBC anthology TV series Play for Today. The episode was a television play that was originally broadcast on 30 January 1979. "Blue Remembered Hills" was written by Dennis Potter, directed by Brian Gibson and produced by Kenith Trodd.

The play concerns a group of seven-year-olds playing in the Forest of Dean one summer afternoon in 1943. It ends abruptly when the character Donald is burned to death, partly as a result of the other children's actions. Although the characters are children, they are played by adult actors, Potter had first used this device in Stand Up, Nigel Barton (1965) and returned to it in Cold Lazarus (1996).

The dialogue is written in a Forest of Dean dialect, which Potter also uses extensively in other dramas incorporating a Forest of Dean setting, most notably A Beast with Two Backs (1968), Pennies from Heaven (1978) and The Singing Detective (1986).

== Cast ==
The stars of the original production were:

Robin Ellis (John), Michael Elphick (Peter), Colin Welland (Willie), John Bird (Raymond), Helen Mirren (Angela), Janine Duvitski (Audrey), Colin Jeavons (Donald).

The screenplay has also been adapted for the theatre. The play is now a standard text for GCSE Drama in Great Britain.

== Title ==
The title comes from the 40th poem in A.E. Housman's A Shropshire Lad. The poem is read by Potter himself at the end of the BBC version of the play.

Into my heart an air that kills
From yon far country blows:
What are those blue remembered hills,
What spires, what farms are those?

That is the land of lost content,
I see it shining plain,
The happy highways where I went
And cannot come again.
