= You Couldn't Be Cuter =

Song performed by Irene Dunne

Song by Irene Dunne
- Written: 1938
- Composer(s): Jerome Kern
- Lyricist(s): Dorothy Fields

"You Couldn't Be Cuter" is a 1938 song composed by Jerome Kern, with lyrics written by Dorothy Fields.

It was written for the film Joy of Living (1938) where it was introduced by Irene Dunne.

Popular recordings in 1938 were by Tommy Dorsey and His Orchestra (vocal by Edythe Wright) and by Ray Noble and His Orchestra (vocal by Tony Martin).

== Popular culture ==
The song is featured in the 1978 Dennis Potter BBC drama series Pennies from Heaven.
