= Gareth Davies (director) =

British television director and actor

Gareth Davies is a British television director and actor.

Davies began his career as an actor with stage roles at the Royal Court Theatre in London and a recurring role in the early BBC soap opera Compact. It is though as a television director where Davies made his greatest impact. He directed several of television dramatist Dennis Potter's earliest plays, such as The Nigel Barton Plays (1965), Moonlight on the Highway, and Son of Man (both 1969).

Davies's other work included serial adaptations of literary classics, such as Balzac's Cousin Bette (1971), Tom Brown's Schooldays (also 1971), which won several Emmys after it was screened in the United States, and Oliver Twist (1985).
