= Follow the Yellow Brick Road =

- Written by: Dennis Potter
- Directed by: Alan Bridges
- Starring: Denholm Elliott; Billie Whitelaw; Richard Vernon; Bernard Hepton; Dennis Waterman; Michele Dotrice
- Country of origin: United Kingdom

Production
- Producer: Roderick Graham
- Running time: 69 minutes

Original release
- Network: BBC 2
- Release: 4 July 1972

Follow the Yellow Brick Road is a television play by Dennis Potter, first broadcast in 1972 as part of BBC Two's The Sextet series of eight plays featuring the same six actors. The play's central theme is of popular culture becoming the inheritor of religious scripture, which anticipated Potter's later serial Pennies from Heaven. The play's title is taken from the song used in The Wizard of Oz, another version of which features in the incidental music.

== Synopsis ==
Jack Black is a disturbed actor who believes himself to be trapped in a television play, followed around by an invisible camera. Having sought the help of an NHS hospital psychiatrist, Jack explains that although he has recently only been able to find work in television commercials he much prefers them to television plays, which he considers morally corrupting. He goes on to reveal that his sexual disgust drove his wife Judy into having an affair with his agent Colin and that he has lost his faith.

Leaving the psychiatrist's surgery he encounters his wife, who persuades him to go somewhere where they can talk. They head to Barnes Common where Jack becomes violent and, convinced the camera is on him again (he acted in a dog food commercial there), decides to disrupt the narrative by running Judy over with her car. In an attempt to restore some 'goodness' into the plot he goes to Colin's flat to see his young wife Veronica, who mistakes his declarations of love as a sexual advance and invites him to seduce her. At an appointment the next day (junior) Doctor Bilson prescribes Jack with some different drugs to alleviate his paranoia. Jack leaves the hospital and climbs into a car with his wife Judy – and the whole play ends with "Jack's next job (in reality or imagination) ... fronting a presentation" for his newly prescribed drugs.

=== Principal cast ===
- Denholm Elliott as Jack Black
- Billie Whitelaw as Judy Black
- Richard Vernon as Doctor Whitman
- Bernard Hepton as Colin Sands
- Dennis Waterman as Doctor Bilson
- Michele Dotrice as Veronica Sands

== Structure and themes ==
The action of the play is broken up by two mock television commercials for breakfast cereal ("Krispy Krunch") and dog food ("Waggytail Din-Din"): both of which feature Denholm Elliott's character Jack Black acting, and justify his claim to the psychiatrist that the adverts present an idealistic and "pure" world view. As Jack's mental health deteriorates throughout the course of the play, the voiceovers and dialogue featured in these commercials start to form an ironic commentary into his condition. The Krispy Krunch commercial, which originally sees Jack going to the kitchen for a midnight snack, transforms into a recollection of how he stumbled upon his wife in bed with his agent, while extracts from the Waggytail Din-Din advert are intercut with Veronica's misunderstanding of Jack's intention as she invites him to seduce her ("Dogs can't live without it!"). The play's final turning in on itself as one long commercial for tranquillisers sees Jack dressed in a medic's white coat in a television studio, quoting the "Epistle of St Paul to the Philippians". Potter uses these commercials as a wider metaphor for popular culture becoming an inheritor of scripture; this is a device he explores in several plays, all of which take an essentially religious structure (see below).

A major theme of the play is the exploration of individual choice in the face of a seemingly omniscient narrator. Jack appears to be aware of his role as a character within the confines of a television play and comments accordingly on the drama as it progresses. In the opening scene, as he waits for his appointment with the psychiatrist, Jack comments on the "shoddy" set design and the play's apparent lack of pace ("Not much bloody action, is there? [...] People will switch over or switch off"); when an elderly patient tries to make polite conversation with him, he chastises her for the banality of her dialogue ("You don't get many interesting lines, do you?") before acknowledging this is "not [her] fault" and that she has "only got a small part". Jack's paranoia about his predicament is intensified by his awareness of the camera, which he frequently addresses, either to demand that it stops following him, or to ridicule the audience ("I can picture them now [...] Munching away on their telly snacks, the corrupt zombies"). Jack abdicates responsibility for his actions in the early part of the play by surrendering himself to its anonymous, malevolent author —when he beats his wife Judy during their walk on Barnes Common he immediately apologises by saying that is what the script demanded him to do— but when he attempts to take over the narrative in the latter part of the drama only then does he begin to realise exactly how powerless he has become until he receives medical intervention.

== Intertextuality ==
=== Other Potter works ===
Potter incorporated several scenes from Follow the Yellow Brick Road into his first novel Hide and Seek (1973), which also features a central protagonist (in this case 'Daniel Miller') who becomes aware of himself as a character in a novel and seeks to liberate himself from the hands of the author. In this work The Author also derides his agent, clearly based on Clive Goodwin, Potter's own agent at this time, in both works. This theme is also returned to in Double Dare (1976) and Karaoke (1996), both of which feature an author who becomes convinced that their latest works are being played out in front of them and they have been relegated to players in their own drama. The former uses a fictional advert for a chocolate bar, filmed as a pastiche of the 1970s Cadbury's Flake commercials, as a means of demonstrating how far an actress will go in pursuit of her profession, while the latter uses a karaoke club as a metaphor for how human yearning becomes a commodity.

=== Cultural references ===
As a means of underlining Jack's distaste for sex, Potter borrows his character's name from the cobbler in Dylan Thomas' Under Milk Wood (1954); in Thomas' poem, Black finds the sexual habits of the young couples in the eponymous Welsh town disgusting and dreams of frightening them.

The references to The Wizard of Oz (both the film and the original book) underline the central theme of both Potter's play and Frank Baum's Oz stories, which are often viewed as satires for "glitzy commercialism" and the American Dream.

== Broadcast and reception ==
The play was first broadcast on BBC 2 on 4 July 1972 and received mixed reviews with critics missing the religious theme. Potter biographer Humphrey Carpenter thought that actor Denholm Elliott and director Alan Bridges "treated it as light comedy, skating over its psychological agonies", but recognised that Potter had "reached a peak" with this work. It received repeat broadcasts in 1987 (on BBC2) and 2005 (BBC Four) as part of Dennis Potter seasons.

== See also ==
- Double Dare
- Pennies from Heaven
- Karaoke

== Other sources ==
- Graham Fuller (Ed.), Potter on Potter; 1993
- Nigel Williams (Ed.), Arena: Painting the Clouds; 2005
