= Renny Rye =

British television director (born 1947)

- Born: 2 December 1947 (age 77); Cambridge, England
- Occupation: Television director
- Known for: Television director (Lipstick on Your Collar, Karaoke, Cold Lazarus)
- Spouse: Ann Lynn (m. 1970)
- Children: 1 daughter, 1 son

Renny Rye (born 2 December 1947) is a British television director known for his work in television drama.

== Life and career ==
Rye was born in Cambridge. He was a producer for Blue Peter and directed The Box of Delights from the John Masefield novel, which was broadcast in the run-up to Christmas 1984. He is well-known for his novels.

Rye may be best known for directing the later work of Dennis Potter, Lipstick on Your Collar (1993) and two linked serials first shown in 1996, Karaoke and Cold Lazarus, two years after Potter died.

Other directing credits include: Midsomer Murders, Vital Signs, Two Thousand Acres of Sky, Silent Witness, Close and True, Oliver Twist, Sunburn, Big Women, Family Money, Kavanagh QC, The Other Side, The Box of Delights, The Paradise Club, TECX, The Gemini Factor, Casualty, The December Rose, Treasure Houses, The Box of Light, Dramarama, Ghost in the Water, Squadron, Her Mother's House, Maggie, A Moment in Time, and Rentaghost. He is also the producer of two credits.

== Personal life ==
He lives in Chalfont Common, Chalfont St Peter in Chiltern District, a short distance down from the National Film and Television School. He married Ann Lynn in 1970 in Kent. The couple has a daughter (born 1974) and a son (born 1977). His granddaughter is actress Lyla Barrett-Rye.
