= Shaggy Dog (The Company of Five) =

- The Company of Five episode
- Episode no.: Series 1 Episode 2
- Directed by: Gareth Davies
- Written by: Dennis Potter
- Production code: London Weekend Television
- Running time: c.50 minutes + commercials

"Shaggy Dog", broadcast by ITV on 10 November 1968, is a black-and-white television play by Dennis Potter written for the London Weekend Television anthology series The Company of Five, specifically a group of five actors. The Company of Five ran for one series of six episodes.

== Synopsis ==
A man walks through central London on his way to a job interview, perceiving his surroundings as resembling a zoo. He behaves oddly, bumping into people, speaking gibberish, and avoiding the cracks between paving stones. Meanwhile, Johnson (Ray Smith), the boss of the Bideawhile Organisation, a hotel chain and leisure conglomerate, is trying to persuade his colleague Mr James (Cyril Luckham) that the methods of a new consultant he has contracted from the Transatlantic Corporation will aid their ability to identify potential employees who may suffer from stress and poor health. Johnson is taken aback when the consultant, Parker (Derek Godfrey), arrives wearing an obviously false nose, but Mr James is unfazed.

The man seen earlier, Wilkie (John Neville), arrives for his interview, and is kept waiting on Parker's insistence as a test of his vulnerability. He is interviewed for a management position by Mr James and by Parker—who is now wearing a woman's blonde wig. Wilkie displays extensive knowledge, from the financial and business press, of the company's history and prospects—which he does not think are very promising. He is repeatedly shocked that the firm does not possess a computer. Parker, meanwhile, insists on knowing about Wilkie's relationship with his mother; also about any bedwetting; and pounces on him when he admits to suffering from headaches. Parker concludes (correctly) that Wilkie is recovering from a nervous breakdown.

After Mr James recites a limerick with lines ending on 'Bristol' and 'pistol', Wilkie aims his gun at the two men. Now intent on revenge, he recounts a story about the 'Rary', a (fictional) now-extinct species, and threatens Mr Parker for his insulting fixations. Johnson returns to the office, but flees. He tells the receptionist (Ann Bell) that he should never have taken on Parker. They hear two shots, but Johnson hurriedly leaves. The receptionist discovers that James and Parker are dead, and faints. She comes round at the open window to which Wilkie has moved her. He again tells his 'Rary' story, before jumping to his death from a window of the tall office block.

== Reputation ==
The recording of "Shaggy Dog" was long thought to be lost; its rediscovery was announced in January 2005. The play's director Gareth Davies recalled the work as "a sad piece about a madman applying for a job. Not a great play. A sort of sour joke." Once described as "perhaps the most bizarre of all Potter's single plays", it shows Potter continuing with themes begun in The Confidence Game in 1965. "Shaggy Dog" has been issued on DVD in Region 2, along with the other plays Potter wrote for LWT.
