= The Glittering Coffin =

- Author: Dennis Potter
- Language: English
- Publisher: Gollancz Press
- Publication date: 1960
- Publication place: United Kingdom
- Preceded by: First work
- Followed by: The Changing Forest: Life in the Forest of Dean Today

The Glittering Coffin was the first non-fiction work by the British television writer Dennis Potter. The book was written while Potter was a student at Oxford University and publication was delayed by a year due to a printing strike. The work focuses on the politics of Britain in the post-war years. Cook (1994) describes the work as 'amalgam of all Potter's views on social class and 'the affluent society'. In an interview shortly before his death Potter expressed views dismissive of the work stating it was "a kind of metaphor for the condition of England. Typical young man's title, you see, typical piece of that sort of humbugging, canting rhetoric, which young men - bless their hearts - specialise in".
