= Mesmer (film) =

- Directed by: Roger Spottiswoode
- Written by: Dennis Potter
- Produced by: Robert Goodale
- Starring: Alan Rickman; Donal Donnelly; Amanda Ooms; Simon McBurney
- Cinematography: Elemér Ragályi
- Edited by: Susan Shipton
- Music by: Michael Nyman
- Distributed by: First Look Studios; Cineplex Odeon Films (Canada)
- Release date: August 25, 1994
- Running time: 107 minutes
- Countries: Austria, Canada, United Kingdom, Germany
- Language: English
- Budget: ~£5,600,000

Mesmer is a 1994 Austrian-Canadian-British-German biographical film directed by Roger Spottiswoode from a script by Dennis Potter. It stars Alan Rickman as Franz Anton Mesmer and depicts his radical new ways as a pioneering physician.

== Plot ==
In 18th century Vienna, Franz Anton Mesmer believes he is able to heal people by drawing out something unique from inside his patients. However, the only ones who seem to have improvements are the young ladies he helps. His controversial methods and their consequences lead him to leave Vienna and head to Paris. However, once there, he takes advantage of his unique methods to provide entertainment, for which he is censured by other doctors.

== Main cast ==
- Alan Rickman as Franz Anton Mesmer
- Amanda Ooms as Maria Theresa Paradies
- Donal Donnelly as Doctor
- David Burke as Doctor
- David Hemblen as Dr. Ingehousz
- Simon McBurney as Franz
- Gillian Barge as Frau Mesmer
- Peter Dvorsky as Dr. Deslon
- Anna Thalbach as Francisca
- Flóra Kádár as The Afflicted

== Details ==
The movie was released on videocassette by First Look and in Canada in 1994 by Cineplex Odeon and MCA. In 2000, the movie was released on DVD by Image Entertainment, but has been discontinued since. As of January 3, 2010, there have been no plans made to release a new DVD.

This movie was shot in Vienna, Austria with the interior shots filmed at Esterházy Palace in Fertõd, Hungary.

Mesmer was released in August 1994 in Canada, at the Montréal World Film Festival.

== Quotes ==
Franz Anton Mesmer: (with sarcasm) "Professor Doctor Stoerk, can I help you at all? I deal with most derangements, sir."

== Awards ==
Awards
| Award | Year | Award | Recipient | Result |
|---|---|---|---|---|
| Montréal World Film Festival | 1994 | Best Actor | Alan Rickman | Won |
