= Nigel Barton =

- Also known as: Stand Up, Nigel Barton; Vote, Vote, Vote for Nigel Barton
- Written by: Dennis Potter
- Directed by: Gareth Davies
- Starring: Keith Barron
- Country of origin: United Kingdom
- No. of episodes: 2

Production
- Producers: Graeme MacDonald; James MacTaggart
- Running time: 75–80 minutes

Original release
- Network: BBC1
- Release: 8 December – 15 December 1965

The Nigel Barton plays are two semi-autobiographical television dramas by Dennis Potter, first broadcast on BBC1 on 8 and 15 December 1965 as part of The Wednesday Play strand. The first play, Stand Up, Nigel Barton, follows the eponymous character's journey from his childhood in a small mining community to winning a scholarship for Oxford, while the second play, Vote, Vote, Vote for Nigel Barton, sees him standing for Parliament as the Labour Party candidate in a by-election. Both plays develop themes and use dramatic devices that became hallmarks of Potter's later plays for television.

== Development ==
According to Sergio Angelini, writing for the BFI Screenonline website, Stand Up, Nigel Barton is "in some ways the most nakedly autobiographical of Dennis Potter's works". He said that the school sequences were inspired by his own school days, particularly the experience of being bullied for his perceived cleverness and the incident of the class pot plant. Potter himself grew up in a small mining community, where his father worked down the pit, and drew upon his own journey from the Forest of Dean to Oxford.

The idea of basing the play around Barton's television interview was inspired by Potter's own contribution in 1958 to the Labour politician Christopher Mayhew's BBC series Does Class Matter? According to Potter, contrary to the way it is treated in the play, the interview helped family relations. Does Class Matter?, however, was previewed in Reynold's News with the headline "Miner's Son at Oxford Felt Ashamed of Home".

Barry Norman, in a review for the Daily Mail on 13 December 1965, said that it was one of the best plays the BBC had broadcast that year. He wrote that should the second Barton play live up to expectations, it would place Potter "in the forefront of TV playwrights".

Potter stood as the Labour candidate for Hertfordshire East, a safe Conservative seat, in the general election of 1964, against the incumbent Derek Walker-Smith. He later claimed that by the end of the campaign he was so disillusioned with party politics that he did not even vote for himself. His candidacy was unsuccessful. Potter drew on his experiences canvassing support in Vote, Vote, Vote for Nigel Barton. The character of Jack Hay was inspired by Potter's own political agent, Ron Brewer.

== Plot ==
=== Stand Up, Nigel Barton ===
The play opens with Nigel (Keith Barron) following his father (Jack Woolgar) to work at the local colliery, questioning why his father walks in the middle of the road instead of using the pavement, and laughing at his assertion that it is an old miners' tradition. As his father rushes to clock in, Nigel muses on the very different paths their lives have taken.

The scene shifts to Nigel at school, in a scene in which, as in all the school scenes in the play, the children, including Nigel, are played by adults, a technique that Potter used again in Blue Remembered Hills. Then, in a brief montage, we are carried to Nigel's arrival at Oxford in his first year. Nigel is introduced to the college scout, who embarrasses him by calling him "sir". We then return to Nigel at school, watching the class bully/clown Georgie Pringle (Johnnie Wade) being called up to the front of the class to read a passage from the Bible. He chooses a passage from the Book of Ezekiel that he and the children find amusing, but the teacher (Janet Henfrey) finds his behaviour blasphemous and canes him. She then calls Nigel, much to his embarrassment and the chagrin of the class, to read another passage. The teacher praises Nigel for the clarity of his reading, for which he earns the contempt of his peers. After school the other children, with Georgie as the ringleader, bully Nigel, leaving him upset and frustrated.

The play then returns to Nigel at Oxford, where he is struggling to reconcile his working-class background with his new-found social mobility. When he returns home for the summer Nigel finds himself a figure of suspicion for some members of the community, who believe that he has betrayed his roots by taking up his university scholarship. This leaves Nigel confused and frustrated as to where his allegiance lies. Back at New College, Nigel attends a party where he meets an upper-class girl called Jill (Vickery Turner) who becomes enamoured of his unwillingness to adapt to the new social codes he encounters at university. He is also approached by a television producer who has witnessed Nigel in the debating chamber discussing class conflict and asks him to appear in a documentary on the subject.

Back at school Nigel, in a fit of pique, has torn the stem of the class flower. That afternoon, as the teacher moves round the classroom looking for the culprit, Nigel breaks down. The teacher forces him to stand up and, as Georgie starts to mock him, Nigel tells the teacher that Georgie damaged the flower. The other children leap to Nigel's defence and Georgie is dragged away to the headmaster's office to receive a caning.

Back in the present day Nigel's parents are visited by a journalist who informs them that he has seen a recording of Nigel's participation in the documentary, which is due to go out that evening, and wants to gauge their reactions to some of his comments. Nigel's father throws him out, angry at the journalist's insinuation that Nigel is ashamed of his roots.

That evening Nigel watches the documentary with his parents. In the televised interview he tries to explain that, while he is proud of his heritage, he feels confused about where he now belongs. He describes himself being "between two worlds", much to his father's anger.

The play ends with Nigel's father walking out of the house and Nigel following him. They stand in the road for a moment and decide to go to the pub together: Nigel's father tells him that he will be walking in the middle of the road.

=== Vote, Vote, Vote for Nigel Barton ===
After the Conservative MP for West Barset is killed in a hunting accident, Nigel Barton is persuaded to stand again for Parliament as the Labour candidate in the upcoming by-election, much to the disapproval of his wife, Ann (Valerie Gearon). Even though he was defeated in the same constituency in the general election the year before, Nigel is enthusiastic about the prospect of a political career and consults his former agent, Jack Hay (John Bailey), on launching the campaign. Jack arranges for Nigel to make several public speaking engagements, which terminate in a disastrous meeting at the local Women's Institute.

Jack feels (and tells the audience, direct to camera) that Nigel is too earnest in his approach to politics and must learn to compromise. Nigel resists Jack's attempts to transform him into "a dutiful party hack", believing that success will depend on issues rather than personality. As Nigel's profile grows, he finds himself being moulded to fit Jack's agenda. After a party debate at the town hall, Ann chastises him for his "cynical" performance, commenting that his idealism and conviction are being overwhelmed by Jack's influence. Nigel begins to have second thoughts about his suitability for public office, but Jack insists that Nigel is behaving in a manner that would be expected of any candidate. When the two men go canvassing for votes the next day, Nigel's frustrations are compounded further by the wave of apathy he is greeted with.

That evening Nigel addresses a Labour Party meeting and discusses his concerns about the campaign. Conflict immediately ensues between Nigel's image-based brand of politics and the old socialist values of the committee. Jack is castigated for making Nigel "apologetic" about his left-wing ideals, Nigel is accused of masking his real views, and the meeting ends with all assembled singing "The Red Flag", though it becomes clear that Nigel does not know the words.

His confidence severely shaken, Nigel embarks on further canvassing, this time of bed-ridden old people. He becomes distressed by the plight of one old man, who repeatedly pleads for his amputated leg to be replaced. Nigel and Jack leave to get ready for a dinner being held by the Lord Mayor where both candidates will make their final public appearances before the by-election.

At the dinner Nigel listens to the address by his Conservative opponent, Sir Hugh Archibald-Lake (Cyril Luckham), with silent disdain. In his own speech he begins to attack the "empty platitudes" of all three major parties, much to the disgust of the other dinner guests, who attempt to silence him by banging on the table. Nigel in exasperation makes a 'V' sign at Archibald-Lake, and the gesture is photographed and published in the next day's newspaper.

In Jack's office on the eve of the election Nigel receives a ticking off from his agent. Jack tells the viewer that, in the end, the political trickery they have seen is their fault, as they would never vote for someone like Nigel. Alone in the office, Nigel turns to address the camera and implores the viewer for their vote.
