= A Beast With Two Backs =

- The Wednesday Play episode
- Episode no.: Season 12; Episode 8
- Directed by: Lionel Harris
- Written by: Dennis Potter
- Original air date: 20 November 1968

"A Beast With Two Backs" is a television play by Dennis Potter, first broadcast on BBC1 on 20 November 1968 as part of The Wednesday Play strand.

The play is a fictional account of an event that happened in the Forest of Dean in the 1890s when four Frenchmen came over the border from Gloucester with dancing bears, who were subsequently killed by miners coming off the late shift in retaliation for an unrelated attack on a young local girl.

== Synopsis ==
In the 1890s, Joe – a travelling Italian showman – and his dancing bear Gina make their way over the border from Gloucester to the Forest of Dean; hungry and penniless from their poor reception in the last town, Joe hopes to drum up more business. As they make their way to Berry Hill, a group of schoolchildren racially abuse Joe. After Joe threatens to set Gina on them, the children disperse. Watching from the undergrowth are miner Mickey Teague and his mistress Rebecca. Mickey is reluctant to leave his wife to be with Rebecca, but Rebecca is pregnant and threatens to reveal him as her unborn child's father unless he comply with her wishes. As she rushes towards the town, Mickey brains Rebecca with a rock and leaves her to die in the woods.

In Berry Hill, the townsfolk enjoy the revelry of a Sunday afternoon at the local tavern. Amongst them is Rufus, the village 'simpleton', who once again is dancing on tables to the amusement and goading of the villagers. The local preacher Ebeneezer, Rufus' guardian, arrives and removes him. Rufus is beaten severely by Ebeneezer, and flees into the woods where he discovers Rebecca. Ebeneezer follows and upon seeing Rebecca's body assumes Rufus has attempted to kill her. As Rebecca is still alive, the preacher fears that she will implicate Rufus and kills her.

Later that day, Joe and Gina arrive in Berry Hill and entertain the townsfolk. False rumours are circulating that Gina had mauled one of the schoolchildren the pair had encountered on their arrival over the border. The townsfolk pelt Joe and Gina with stones and force them to flee the village. Back in the forest, Rebecca's body has been discovered and the local constabulary set to work interviewing the residents of the nearby towns. As the shocked villagers gather together back at the tavern, a desperate Mickey convinces the townsfolk that the bear was responsible.

The townsfolk gather at the chapel for evening prayers where a guilt-stricken Ebeneezer delivers a sermon on 'the beast within'. As the preacher calls on the congregation to vanquish the beast in their midst, the villagers choose to see this as a reference to Joe and Gina and a group of miners head off in pursuit of their quarry. Ebeneezer hangs himself and Rufus, upon discovering the body, flees towards the forest. Arriving at the clearing where Joe and Gina have settled down for the evening, the miners throw stones and heavy rocks at the bear before advancing on Gina and beating her to death. Moved by Joe's tears, the men offer him recompense; Joe declines and asks to be left alone with his dead friend. As the miners return to the village they pass a frightened Rufus, and pause to consider his terror.
