= Brimstone and Treacle =

- Written by: Dennis Potter
- Directed by: Barry Davis
- Starring: Michael Kitchen; Denholm Elliott; Patricia Lawrence; Michelle Newell
- Country of origin: United Kingdom
- Original language: English

Production
- Producer: Kenith Trodd
- Camera setup: multi-camera video/film inserts
- Running time: 72 minutes

Original release
- Network: BBC One
- Release: 25 August 1987

Brimstone and Treacle is a 1976 BBC television play by Dennis Potter. Originally intended for broadcast as an episode of the series Play for Today, it remained untransmitted until 1987. The play was made into a film version (released in 1982) co-starring Sting. Both versions also star Denholm Elliott.

The play features a middle-aged middle-class couple living in a north London suburb whose life has been catastrophically affected by a hit-and-run accident which has left their beautiful undergraduate daughter totally dependent upon them. Their lives are dramatically changed by the arrival of a mysterious young stranger.

== Plot ==
A demon, under the guise of Martin Taylor, stalks the streets to find his next victim. He attempts to convince Tom Bates that they have met previously, and learns through the conversation that Tom's daughter, Pattie, has been left in a vegetative state following a hit-and-run incident two years prior. Martin tells Tom that he knew Pattie, and feigns a collapse at the news of her condition. Tom promises to bring his car to assist Martin, but does not return. Nevertheless, Martin tracks him down using his stolen wallet.

At the Bates' residence, Martin meets Tom's wife, Amy, and also sees Pattie. Pattie is physically recovered, but remains incapable of speech and everyday functions; Amy believes she is more aware of her surroundings than she can express, but Tom insists she is as good as dead. Martin elaborates on his claims of a prior relationship with Pattie, convincing Amy that he had proposed marriage and that Pattie had promised him an answer after three years. He persuades the couple to allow him to stay in Pattie's old room.

The following day, Martin encourages Amy to leave the house. Left alone with Pattie, he mocks and then rapes her. When Amy returns, Martin instigates a prayer over Pattie, where his full demonic powers are revealed. Over dinner, Tom is concerned that his daughter was left alone with a stranger, upsetting Martin. Amy is keen for him to stay after her earlier taste of renewed independence, and Martin offers to continue to run the household. Appealing to his fondness for home comforts and National Front-aligned beliefs, Martin manages to talk Tom into accepting his offer. However, when he attempts to incite Tom into more extreme political ideologies, evoking Nazism, Tom backs away and rejects the National Front.

Overnight, Martin attempts to rape Pattie again, but she awakens from her condition and cries out. Martin flees the house but immediately alights on his next victim. Pattie asks her father what happened, and it is revealed that her hit-and-run was tangentially caused by her discovery of Tom's affair with her friend.

== Television version ==
Brimstone and Treacle was originally written by Potter as a television play, commissioned, paid for and recorded in 1976 by the BBC, for their series Play for Today. The cast were Denholm Elliott (Tom Bates), Michael Kitchen (Martin), Patricia Lawrence (Amy Bates) and Michelle Newell (Pattie); plus minor characters.

The original 1976 play was withdrawn shortly before its scheduled transmission (despite being listed in the Radio Times) because then Director of Television Programmes Alasdair Milne found it "nauseating" though "brilliantly made". It was finally shown in August 1987 and has been released as a DVD. Rewritten by Potter for the stage, the play premiered on 11 October 1977 at the Crucible Theatre, Sheffield and transferred to the West End the following year.

In the introduction to the play script, published in 1978, Potter recalled that "the BBC received several letters of congratulation for 'taking a stand' against the rising tide etc. of filth etc. and blasphemy etc. which ever threatens etc. to swamp our already beleaguered land". Justifying the play, he wrote: "Brimstone and Treacle is an attempt both to parody certain familiar forms of faith and yet at the same time to give them expression. … we cannot even begin to define 'good' and 'evil' without being aware of the interaction between the two. It is from these things the play draws whatever power or whatever disturbance that earned it an unwelcome notoriety."

== Film adaptation ==
Brimstone & Treacle
- Directed by: Richard Loncraine
- Written by: Dennis Potter
- Produced by: Alan E. Salke; Herbert F. Solow; Kenith Trodd
- Starring: Sting; Denholm Elliott; Joan Plowright; Suzanna Hamilton
- Cinematography: Peter Hannan
- Edited by: Paul Green
- Production companies: Namara Films; Pennies From Heaven Ltd.; Sherwood Productions
- Release date: November 12, 1982 (United States)
- Running time: 87 minutes
- Country: United Kingdom
- Language: English
- Budget: £900,000

A film adaptation was released in 1982. Directed by Richard Loncraine, it stars Denholm Elliott as Bates, Joan Plowright as Norma Bates, Suzanna Hamilton as Pattie, and Sting as Martin. In the film, Mrs. Bates' first name is Norma instead of Amy.

The soundtrack includes works by The Police, Sting, The Go-Go's and Squeeze. Sting's cover of "Spread a Little Happiness" reached No. 16 in the UK Singles Chart.

Brimstone & Treacle was released to DVD by MGM Home Video in 2003 as a Region 1 widescreen DVD.

== Potter on Brimstone and Treacle ==
In 1978, Potter said:

I had written Brimstone and Treacle in difficult personal circumstances. Years of acute psoriatic arthropathy — unpleasantly affecting skin and joints — had not only taken their toll in physical damage but had also, and perhaps inevitably, mediated my view of the world and the people in it. I recall writing (and the words now make me shudder) that the only meaningful sacrament left to human beings was for them to gather in the streets in order to be sick together, splashing vomit on the paving stones as the final and most eloquent plea to an apparently deaf, dumb and blind God. [...] I was engaged in an extremely severe struggle, not so much against the dull grind of a painful and debilitating illness, but with unresolved, almost unacknowledged "spiritual" questions.

== See also ==
- Brimstone and Treacle (soundtrack)
