= The Singing Detective =

1986 BBC television serial drama

- Genre: Film noir Musical
- Created by: Dennis Potter
- Written by: Dennis Potter
- Directed by: Jon Amiel
- Starring: Michael Gambon; Jim Carter; Lyndon Davies; Patrick Malahide; Bill Paterson; Alison Steadman; Janet Suzman; Joanne Whalley; Imelda Staunton
- Country of origin: United Kingdom
- Original language: English
- No. of series: 1
- No. of episodes: 6

Production
- Executive producer: Rick McCallum
- Producers: Kenith Trodd; John Harris
- Running time: 58–76 minutes

Original release
- Network: BBC1
- Release: 16 November – 21 December 1986

Related
- Pennies From Heaven (1978); Lipstick on Your Collar (1993)

The Singing Detective is a six-part BBC television serial drama, written by Dennis Potter, starring Michael Gambon and directed by Jon Amiel. Its six episodes are "Skin", "Heat", "Lovely Days", "Clues", "Pitter Patter" and "Who Done It".

The serial was broadcast in the United Kingdom on BBC1 in 1986 on Sunday nights from 16 November to 21 December, with later PBS and cable television showings in the United States. It won a Peabody Award in 1989. It ranks 20th on the British Film Institute's list of the 100 Greatest British Television Programmes, as voted by industry professionals in 2000. It was included in the 1992 Dennis Potter retrospective at the Museum of Television & Radio and became a permanent addition to the museum's collections in New York and Los Angeles. There was co-production funding from the Australian Broadcasting Corporation. The series was released on DVD in the US on 15 April 2003 and in the UK on 8 March 2004. It is also available on BBC iPlayer. It was restored in UHD in 2025: this version was first broadcast on BBC Four on the 14 and 21 May before release on iPlayer.

== Plot ==
Mystery writer Philip E. Marlow is suffering writer's block and is hospitalized because his psoriatic arthropathy, a chronic skin and joint disease, is at an acute stage, forming lesions and sores over his entire body and partially crippling his hands and feet. Dennis Potter suffered from this disease and he wrote with a pen tied to his fist in much the same fashion Marlow does in the last episode. (Although severe, Marlow's condition was intentionally understated compared to Potter's, whose skin would sometimes crack and bleed.)

As a result of constant pain, a fever caused by the condition and his refusal to take medication, Marlow falls into a fantasy world involving his Chandleresque novel The Singing Detective, an escapist and noir adventure about a detective (also named "Philip Marlow") who sings at a dance hall and takes the jobs refused by "the guys who don't sing". Marlow is "plot-dreaming", trying out various solutions to a working plot in his head, deciding as he goes what plot element works best with what character or situation, interspersed with bits of ideas that occur to him off the top of his head and discarding (with some afterthoughts) parts of his story that no longer work when other changes have been made.

The real Marlow also experiences flashbacks to his childhood in rural England and his mother's life in wartime London. The rural location is the Forest of Dean, Potter's birthplace and the location for filming, referred to as 'the Forest.' The suicide of his mother is one of several recurring images in the series; Marlow uses it (whether subconsciously or not) in his murder mystery and sometimes replaces her face with different women in his life, real and imaginary. The noir mystery is never solved; all that is ultimately revealed is an intentionally vague plot involving smuggled Nazi war criminals being protected by the Allies and Soviet agents attempting to stop them. This perhaps reflects Marlow's view that fiction should be "all clues and no solutions".

The three worlds of the hospital, the noir thriller and wartime England often merge in Marlow's mind, resulting in a fourth layer, in which character relationships that would otherwise be impossible (e.g., fictional characters interacting with non-fictional characters) occur. This is evident in that characters in the novel represent many of Marlow's friends and enemies (perceived or otherwise), particularly Raymond, Marlow's mother's lover, who appears as the antagonist in the "real" and noir worlds (although the "real" Binney/Finney is ultimately a fantasy as well). The use of Binney as a villain stems from the fact that Binney committed adultery with Marlow's mum and simultaneously (and perhaps publicly) cuckolded Marlow's dad, whom Marlow loved. Marlow's guilt at his apparent belief that he caused his parents' separation and even his mother's suicide is exacerbated by his early childhood memory when he framed young Mark Binney for defecating on the desk of a disciplinarian elementary teacher (Janet Henfrey). The innocent Binney is brutally beaten in front of the classroom and Marlow is lauded for telling the "truth".

These events haunt Marlow and one of the shadowy villains who apparently is determined to kill Marlow looks very much like an adult version of the real child, Mark Binney. The real Mark Binney eventually ends up in a mental institution, as Marlow confesses later to the psychiatrist. The villainous Binney/Finney character is killed off in both realities. It is suggested that in each reality, the guilt of Binney/Finney/Mark is entirely the product of Marlow's imagination as, in one case, Finney, the wife's lover, does not exist. In the other, it is the name of the character Marlow chooses as the guilty party and the boy's guilt is a lie told by Marlow to his teacher. In the end, Marlow chooses a killer, who looks more like adult Binney, to live and himself to die, thus showing growth.

== Cast ==
- Michael Gambon as Philip Marlow
- Patrick Malahide as Mark Binney / Raymond / Mark Finney
- Joanne Whalley as Nurse Mills
- David Ryall as Mr. Hall
- Gerard Horan as Reginald
- Leslie French as Mr. Tomkey / Noddy Tomkey
- Ron Cook as First Mysterious Man
- George Rossi as Second Mysterious Man
- Sharon D. Clarke as Night Nurse
- Geff Francis as Porter
- Janet Suzman as Nicola
- Alison Steadman as Mrs. Marlow / Lili
- Jim Carter as Mr. Marlow
- Imelda Staunton as Staff Nurse White
- Janet Henfrey as Schoolteacher
- Bill Paterson as Dr. Gibbon
- Kate McKenzie as Sonia
- Badi Uzzaman as Ali

Janet Henfrey has previously played the same character in Potter's earlier TV play Stand Up, Nigel Barton.

Marlow as a boy is played by Lyndon Davies, while William Speakman plays Mark Binney (schoolboy); Davies and Speakman were contemporaries at Chosen Hill School in Gloucestershire, close to Potter's birthplace of the Forest of Dean. Some members of the cast play several roles. Marlow and his alter ego, the singing detective, are played by Michael Gambon. Patrick Malahide plays three characters—the contemporary Finney, who Marlow thinks is having an affair with his ex-wife Nicola, played by Janet Suzman; the imaginary Binney, a central character in the murder plot; and Raymond, a friend of Marlow's father who has an affair with his mother (Alison Steadman). Steadman plays Marlow's mother and the mysterious "Lili", one of the murder victims. At the end of the serial, Marlow and Nicola appear to have repaired their relationship.

== Production ==
In Potter's original script, the hospital scenes were to be shot with television (video), the noir scenes with film cameras, and the period material (Marlow's childhood) filmed in black-and-white. All scenes were shot on film, over Potter's objections. Potter wanted the hospital scenes to maintain the sensibility of sitcom conventions. Although this was tempered in the final script, some character interactions retain this concept. For example, Mr. Hall and Reginald, who are also intended to serve as a mock chorus for the main action occurring in the hospital.

Originally the title of the series was to be "Smoke Rings", and the Singing Detective noir thriller was to be dropped after the first episode; Potter felt it would not hold the audience's attention. The discarded title may have referred to a particular monologue delivered by the hospitalized Marlow in the first episode, which includes the sentiment that, despite everything else, the one thing he really wants is a cigarette. Marlow's medical and mental progress is subtly gauged by his ability to reach over to his dresser and get his cigarettes.

=== Sources ===
Borrowing portions of his first novel, Hide and Seek (1973), Potter added autobiographical aspects (or, as he put it, deeply "personal" aspects), along with 1940s popular music and the noir style. The result is regarded by some as one of the peaks of 20th-century drama. Marlow's hallucinations are not far from the Philip Marlowe in Murder, My Sweet, the 1944 film adaptation of Raymond Chandler's Farewell, My Lovely, which stars Dick Powell as Marlowe. Powell himself would later portray a "singing detective" on radio's Richard Diamond, Private Detective, serenading his girlfriend, Helen Asher (Virginia Gregg), at the end of each episode. A reference is made in the last episode to a novel by Agatha Christie, The Murder of Roger Ackroyd. This may be meant to suggest that Marlow is an unreliable narrator.

== Influence ==
Although The Singing Detective did not meet with spectacular viewing figures, it proved influential within the television industry. The serial met with considerable critical praise in America. Steven Bochco has credited the serial as the chief inspiration for Cop Rock (1990), although unlike The Singing Detective, Bochco's drama features specially recorded musical numbers rather than existing work. The serial was adapted into a 2003 American film featuring Robert Downey Jr. and Mel Gibson, with the locations changed to the United States. The British rock band Elbow took their name from a line in the series that declared elbow the "loveliest word in the English language". The Singing Detective was also a significant influence on Peter Bowker's 2004 BBC series Blackpool, through Bowker's characters notably sung along with the show's songs, rather than lip-syncing as Potter's.

== Music ==
As well as its dark themes, the series is notable for its use of 1930s and 40s music, often incorporated into surreal musical numbers, in which the characters lip sync the vocal lines with uncanny accuracy. This is a device Potter used in his earlier miniseries Pennies from Heaven. The main theme music is the classic "Peg o' My Heart", of Ziegfeld Follies fame. The upbeat music as the theme for such a dark story is perhaps a reference to Carol Reed's The Third Man, with a harmonica in the place of a zither (The Third Man is indeed referenced in a number of camera shots, according to DVD commentary). Director Jon Amiel compiled and spliced the generic thriller music used throughout the series from 60 library tapes he had brought together.

The following is a chronological soundtrack listing:

- "Peg o' My Heart" – Max Harris & his Novelty Trio (theme song; instrumental)
- "I've Got You Under My Skin" – The BBC Dance Orchestra directed by Henry Hall
- "Blues in the Night" – Anne Shelton
- "Dry Bones" – Fred Waring and His Pennsylvanians
- "Rockin' in Rhythm" – The Jungle Band (Duke Ellington and his Famous Orchestra)
- "Cruising Down the River" – Lou Preager Orchestra
- "Don't Fence Me In" – Bing Crosby and The Andrews Sisters
- "It Might as Well Be Spring" – Dick Haymes
- "Frühlingsrauschen (Rustle of Spring) Op. 32 No. 3" – Sinding
- "Bird Song at Eventide" – Ronnie Ronalde with Robert Farnon and his Orchestra
- "Paper Doll" – The Mills Brothers
- "Bei Mir Bist Du Schoen" – Al Bowlly with The Ray Noble Orchestra
- "Lili Marlene" – Lale Andersen
- "I Get Along Without You Very Well" – Lew Stone Band
- "Do I Worry?" – The Ink Spots
- "Ac-Cent-Tchu-Ate the Positive" – Bing Crosby and The Andrews Sisters
- "The Umbrella Man" – Sammy Kaye and his Orchestra
- "You Always Hurt the One You Love" – The Mills Brothers
- "After You've Gone" – Al Jolson with Matty Malneck's Orchestra and The Four Hits and a Miss
- "It's a Lovely Day Tomorrow" – Jack Payne and his Orchestra
- "Into Each Life Some Rain Must Fall" – Ella Fitzgerald and The Ink Spots
- "The Very Thought of You" – Al Bowlly & The Ray Noble Orchestra
- "The Teddy Bear's Picnic" – The Henry Hall Orchestra
- "We'll Meet Again" – Vera Lynn

=== Soundtracks ===
The Singing Detective soundtrack was released on vinyl in two different forms:

- 1986: The Singing Detective (BBC Records CD 608)

Chart (1988)	Peak position
Australia (Kent Music Report)	47

- 1988: The Other Side of the Singing Detective (BBC Records and Tapes BBC CD 708)

Later releases on CD are:

- 2002: (Portugal) Music from "The Singing Detective" and More (Golden Star GSS 5349) (3 CD)
- 2002: (Portugal) Music from "The Singing Detective" (The Wonderful Music of WMO 90375) (1 CD)
