= Cold Lazarus =

1996 British television drama series

- Written by: Dennis Potter
- Directed by: Renny Rye
- Starring: Albert Finney
- Composer: Christopher Gunning
- Country of origin: United Kingdom
- No. of episodes: 4

Production
- Producers: Kenith Trodd; Rosemarie Whitman
- Cinematography: Remi Adefarasin; Ashley Rowe
- Editor: Clare Douglas
- Running time: 60 minutes

Original release
- Network: Channel 4 BBC One
- Release: 26 May – 16 June 1996

Cold Lazarus is a four-part British television drama written by Dennis Potter with the knowledge that he was dying of pancreatic cancer. It forms the second half of a pair with the television serial Karaoke. It is Potter's only science fiction work.

== Plot ==
Cold Lazarus is set in the 24th century, in a dystopian Britain where the ruined streets are unsafe, and where society is run by American oligarchs in charge of powerful commercial corporations. Experiences are almost all virtual, and anything deemed authentic (such as coffee and cigarettes) has either been banned or replaced by synthetic substitutes.

At a cryonics research institute in London, funded by the pharmaceuticals tycoon Martina Masdon, a group of scientists led by Dr. Emma Porlock is working on reviving the mind of the 20th-century writer Daniel Feeld, whose head was frozen after Feeld's death shortly after the events of Karaoke. Unable to see any profit in the project, Masdon considers discontinuing it, but the media mogul David Siltz, who has been spying on Masdon, envisages making a fortune from broadcasting Feeld's memories on TV, and proposes to Porlock that her team work for him.

Porlock is unaware that a member of her team, Fyodor Glazunov is a member of the resistance group RON ('Reality Or Nothing'), which attempts to undermine the reliance of society upon advanced technology by carrying out violent attacks. Glazunov identifies Kaya, another of Porlock's team, as a potential recruit to his superior Andrew Milton, but Milton kills Kaya, believing her unsuitable. Angered by Kaya's murder, Glazunov kills Milton. Porlock then discovers the truth about Glazunov but, to distract him from the possibility of killing her, consults with him about the Siltz deal. Glazunov approves of the broadcast of Feeld's memories, which he believes might provoke a revolt against the 'inauthentic' life propagated by the authorities. It is shortly after this that Porlock accepts Siltz's offer, just as Masdon realises the potential of the Lazarus project.

As more of Feeld's thoughts and memories are unearthed, it becomes evident not only that Feeld's mind is conscious of its predicament, but also that Feeld is attempting to communicate with the scientists, and is pleading to be allowed to die. At this point Glazunov, Porlock and Luanda Partington (another long standing member of the team) begin to doubt the morality of their project. Another of their team, Watson, having been coerced into informing on his colleagues, unwittingly denounces Glazunov as a RON member and saboteur. Having been warned, Glazunov heads for the laboratory to put Feeld out of his misery. In the confrontation that ensues, Glazunov is able to kill Siltz, and, after a final communication with Feeld (in which they make eye contact), he destroys the laboratory, Feeld's head, and himself, in the process.

=== Episodes ===
- Episode 1: "One". First broadcast: 26 May 1996. Running time: 50 or 52 minutes.
- Episode 2: "Two". First broadcast: 2 June 1996.
- Episode 3: "Three". First broadcast: 9 June 1996.
- Episode 4: "Four". First broadcast: 16 June 1996.

== Cast ==
- Albert Finney as Daniel Feeld
- Frances de la Tour as Emma Porlock
- Ciarán Hinds as Fyodor Glazunov
- Ganiat Kasumu as Luanda Partington
- Grant Masters as Tony Watson
- Carmen Ejogo as Blinda
- Diane Ladd as Martina Masdon
- Henry Goodman as David Siltz
- Claudia Malkovich as Kaya
- David Foxxe as Andrew Milton
- Donald Sumpter as Doctor Rawl
- Rob Brydon as Karl

The series also featured an early TV appearance by Rupert Penry-Jones as a militiaman. Additionally, some of the cast of Karaoke appear in Feeld's flashbacks.

== Production ==
Karaoke and Cold Lazarus were filmed as a single production by the same team; both were directed by Renny Rye and feature Albert Finney as the writer Daniel Feeld. The plays were unique in being co-productions between the BBC and Channel 4, something Potter had expressly requested before his death.

Parts of Karaoke and Cold Lazarus were filmed in the Forest of Dean in Gloucestershire, which is where Potter was born and raised. Children from local schools, including St Briavels Parochial Primary School, appeared in the series as extras in flashbacks. Other filming locations included a Nottinghamshire power station.

== Broadcast and release ==
The show was first broadcast on Channel 4 in 1996 on Sunday evenings, with a repeat on BBC1 the following day. This first broadcast of episode 1 drew an audience of 3.8 million viewers. Viewing figures for the series averaged 2 to 3 million.

The series was broadcast in the United States in 1997 on Bravo. The series had previously been offered to PBS.

Both Karaoke and Cold Lazarus were released on DVD from Acorn Media in September 2010. The four episodes are embodied in two discs. The discs include biographies.

Both series are available to watch online via the Channel 4 website.

== Reception ==
Christpher Dunkley said that Cold Lazarus is "astonishing".

== Legacy ==
Many of the futuristic costumes made for the actors to wear in Cold Lazarus were later bought by the film company Wibbell Productions and subsequently used in the feature film The Vampires of Bloody Island in 2007. Wibbell later sold many of them individually to private collectors in 2013.

A spaceship prop, in 2023, was in Leighton Buzzard and for sale.
