= Dennis Potter =

British dramatist and screenwriter (1935–1994)

- Cover of The Life and Work of Dennis Potter
- Born: Dennis Christopher George Potter; 17 May 1935; Berry Hill, Gloucestershire, England
- Died: 7 June 1994 (aged 59); Ross-on-Wye, Herefordshire, England
- Education: New College, Oxford
- Occupations: Television playwright, screenwriter, journalist, author, novelist, director
- Spouse: Margaret Morgan (m. 1959; died 1994)
- Children: 3, including Sarah
- Writing career
- Period: 1960–1994
- Genre: Drama
- Notable works: Pennies from Heaven (1978); Blue Remembered Hills (1979); The Singing Detective (1986); Lipstick on Your Collar (1993)

Dennis Christopher George Potter (17 May 1935 – 7 June 1994) was an English television dramatist, screenwriter and journalist. He is best known for his BBC television serials Pennies from Heaven (1978) and The Singing Detective (1986) as well as the BBC television plays Blue Remembered Hills (1979) and Brimstone and Treacle (1976). His television dramas, often set or partly set in the Forest of Dean of his childhood, mixed fantasy and reality, the personal and the social, and often used themes and images from popular culture. Potter is widely regarded as one of the most influential and innovative dramatists to have worked in British television.

Born in Gloucestershire and graduating from Oxford University, Potter initially worked in journalism. After standing for parliament as a Labour candidate at the 1964 general election, his health was affected by the onset of psoriatic arthropathy which necessitated Potter to change career and led to his becoming a television dramatist. He began with contributions to BBC1's regular series The Wednesday Play from 1965, and he continued to work in the medium for the rest of his life, including writing screenplay adaptations for Hollywood studios. Potter died of pancreatic cancer in 1994.

== Early life ==
Dennis Potter was born in Berry Hill, Forest of Dean, Gloucestershire. His father, Walter Edward Potter (1906–1975), was a coal miner in this rural mining area between Gloucester and Wales; his mother was Margaret Constance (née Wale; 1910–2001). Potter had a sister named June.

In 1946, Potter passed the eleven-plus and attended Bell's Grammar School at Coleford. Most of his secondary education, however, was in London at St. Clement Danes Grammar School in Hammersmith (since demolished). When he was ten years old, Potter was sexually abused, an experience he would later allude to many times in his writing. During his speech at the 1993 James MacTaggart Memorial Lecture, Potter referred to this event when explaining his decision to switch from newspaper journalism to screenwriting: "Different words had to be found, with different functions. But why? Why, why, why; the same desperately repeated question I asked myself without any sort of an answer, or any ability to tell my mother or my father, when at the age of ten, between V.E. Day and V.J. Day, I was trapped by an adult's sexual appetite and abused out of innocence." His family returned to the Forest of Dean in 1952, having first left it in 1945, but Potter remained in London.

Between 1953 and 1955, his national service was in the Intelligence Corps of the British Army and he learned Russian at the Joint Services School for Linguists. Having won a State Scholarship to New College, Oxford, he studied philosophy, politics and economics.

== Early career ==
Potter began his career as a journalist with the Daily Herald.

Potter's first non-fiction work, The Glittering Coffin, was published by the Gollancz Press in 1960. The book was a rumination on the changing face of England in the prosperity following the end of the war years. It was followed by The Changing Forest: Life in the Forest of Dean Today (1962), which was based on the "Between Two Rivers" documentary. This book is a study of class and social mobility that demonstrates an early fascination with the effects of the mass media on British cultural life.

He soon returned to television. Daily Herald journalist David Nathan persuaded Potter to collaborate with him on sketches for That Was the Week That Was. Their first piece was used in the edition of 5 January 1963.

Potter stood as the Labour Party candidate for Hertfordshire East, a safe Conservative Party seat, in the 1964 general election against the incumbent Derek Walker-Smith. By the end of the unsuccessful campaign, he claimed that he was so disillusioned with party politics he did not even vote for himself. Potter then embarked on work as a television playwright. He had begun to suffer in 1962 from a condition known as psoriatic arthropathy causing arthritis to develop in his joints as well as affecting his skin with psoriasis. It also made futile any attempt to follow a conventional career path.

== Writing and public career ==
=== The Wednesday Play ===
Potter's career as a television playwright began with The Confidence Course (The Wednesday Play, 1965) which Potter had begun as a novel. An exposé of the Dale Carnegie Institute, it drew threats of litigation from that organisation. Although Potter effectively disowned the play, excluding it from his Who's Who entry, it used non-naturalistic dramatic devices (in this case breaking the fourth wall) which would become hallmarks of Potter's subsequent work. The Confidence Course script was liked by Wednesday Play script editor Roger Smith who then commissioned Potter to write what became the second Nigel Barton play for the new anthology series. Alice (also 1965), his next transmitted play, chronicled the relationship between Charles Lutwidge Dodgson, better known by his nom de plume, Lewis Carroll, and his muse Alice Liddell. The play drew complaints from the descendants of Dodgson, and of Macmillan, the publisher, who objected to the way the relationship was depicted. George Baker played Dodgson.

Potter's most highly regarded works from this period were the semi-autobiographical plays Stand Up, Nigel Barton! and Vote, Vote, Vote for Nigel Barton, which featured Keith Barron. The former recounts the experience of a miner's son attending Oxford University where he finds himself torn between two worlds, culminating in Barton's participation in a television documentary. This mirrored Potter's participation in Does Class Matter (1958), a television documentary made while Potter was an Oxford undergraduate.

The second play features the same character standing as a Labour candidate—his disillusionment with the compromises of electoral politics is based on Potter's own experience. Both plays received praise from critics but aroused considerable tension at the BBC for their potentially incendiary critique of party politics. In his James MacTaggart Memorial Lecture in 1993, Potter recalled how he was asked by "several respected men at the corporation why I wanted to shit on the Queen."

=== First film screenplays ===
In 1978, Herbert Ross was shooting Nijinsky at Shepperton Studios and invited Potter to write the screenplay for his next project Unexpected Valleys. But after watching Pennies from Heaven on television one evening, Ross contacted Potter about the prospect of adapting that series for the cinema. The film version of Pennies from Heaven was launched at MGM as an 'anti-musical' with Steve Martin and Bernadette Peters in the lead roles. According to Potter, the studio demanded continual rewrites of the script and made significant cuts to the film after initial test screenings. The film was released in 1981 to mixed critical reaction and was a box-office failure. Potter, however, was nominated for the Best Adapted Screenplay Oscar that year.

Having already adapted Brimstone and Treacle for the stage after the television production was banned by the BBC, Potter set about writing a film version. It was directed by Richard Loncraine, who also directed Potter's Blade on the Feather at LWT, with Denholm Elliott reprising his role of Mr. Bates from the original television production, while Sting and Joan Plowright replaced Michael Kitchen and Patricia Lawrence in the roles of Martin Taylor and Mrs Bates, respectively. Although a British film made by Potter's own production company (Pennies Productions), the casting of Sting piqued the interest of American investors. As a result, references to Mr Bates' membership of the National Front and a scene discussing racial segregation were omitted—as were many of the non-naturalistic flourishes present in the television production—although the film was much more graphic in its depiction of sexual abuse and rape. The film was not a success at the box office.

Potter's screenplay for Gorky Park (1983) led to his gaining an Edgar Award from the Mystery Writers of America.

=== Works for the BBC in the 1980s ===
Potter's career in the early 1980s was spent as a screenwriter for the cinema. He returned to the BBC for a co-production with 20th Century Fox, writing the scripts for a widely praised but seldom-seen miniseries of F. Scott Fitzgerald's Tender Is the Night (1985) with Mary Steenburgen as Nicole Diver.

The Singing Detective (1986), featuring Michael Gambon, used the dramatist's own problems with the skin disease psoriasis, for Potter an often debilitating condition leading to hospital admission, as a means to merge the lead character's imagination with his perception of reality.

Following Christabel (1988), Potter's adaptation of the memoirs of Christabel Bielenberg, his next TV serial, Blackeyes (1989) was a major disappointment in his career. A drama about a fashion model, it was reviewed as self-indulgent by some critics, and accused of contributing to the misogyny Potter claimed he intended to expose. The critical backlash against Potter following Blackeyes led to Potter being labelled 'Dirty Den' (after Den Watts, the EastEnders character) by the British tabloid press, and resulted in a period of reclusion from television. The serial was adapted into a novel (see below),

In 1990, referring to a scene in The Singing Detective, Mary Whitehouse claimed on BBC Radio that Potter had been influenced by witnessing his mother engaging in adulterous sex. Potter's mother won substantial damages from the BBC and The Listener. Potter had at least at times actually been an admirer of Mrs Whitehouse: the journalist Stanley Reynolds found in 1973 that he "loves the idea of Mrs Whitehouse. He sees her as standing up for all the people with ducks on their walls who have been laughed at and treated like rubbish by the sophisticated metropolitan minority". In 1979 in an interview for The South Bank Show, he rejected "the chorus of abuse" suffered by Whitehouse because she accepted the "central moral importance of – to use the grandest word – art".

=== Later film work ===
Potter wrote the screenplay for Dreamchild (1985), a film which shared themes with his script for the Alice (1965) television play. In her last film role, Coral Browne portrayed the elderly Alice Hargreaves who recalls in flashbacks her childhood when she was the inspiration for Lewis Carroll's Alice in Wonderland. Potter adapted his television play Schmoedipus (1974) for the cinema. The ensuing film, Track 29 (1988), directed by Nicolas Roeg, was Potter's last filmed American project. However, Potter did provide uncredited script work on James and the Giant Peach (released 1995)—his chief contribution providing dialogue for the sardonic caterpillar. Potter makes a sly reference to this in Karaoke when the character Daniel Feeld (Albert Finney) is invited to provide dialogue for an "arthritic goat" in a children's film.

Potter's reputation within the American film industry following the box office disappointments of Pennies from Heaven and Gorky Park ultimately led to difficulty receiving backing for his projects. Potter is known to have written adaptations of The Phantom of the Opera, The Mystery of Edwin Drood, The White Hotel and his earlier television play Double Dare (1976): all these reached the preproduction stage before work was suspended. More fortunate was Mesmer (1993), a biographical film of the 19th century pseudo-scientist Franz Anton Mesmer. Potter's film, Secret Friends (1991), from his novel, Ticket to Ride, starring Alan Bates, premiered in New York at the Museum of Modern Art as the gala closing of the Museum of Television & Radio's week-long Potter retrospective.

The last film Potter actively worked on was Midnight Movie (1994), an adaptation of Rosalind Ashe's novel Moths. The film starred Louise Germaine and Brian Dennehy (who had appeared respectively in Lipstick on Your Collar and Gorky Park) and was directed by Renny Rye. Unable to secure financing from the Arts Council, Potter invested £500,000 in the production; BBC Films provided the rest of the capital. The film was not given a cinema release owing to a lack of interest from distributors and remained unseen until after Potter's death. It was finally broadcast on BBC2 in December 1994 in the Screen Two series, two months after a remake of his lost 1967 play Message for Posterity was transmitted.

A film version of The Singing Detective, based on Potter's own adapted screenplay, was released in 2003 by Icon Productions. Robert Downey, Jr. played the lead alongside Robin Wright Penn and Mel Gibson. Gibson also acted as producer. Potter's screenplay of The White Hotel was adapted as a radio play and broadcast in September 2018.

=== The media and Rupert Murdoch ===
In 1993, Potter was given a half-hour slot in prime time by Channel 4 in their Opinions strand produced by Open Media. Potter's chosen topic was what he perceived to be a contamination of news media and its effect on declining standards in British television "particularly journalists who criticised his Channel 4 series Lipstick on Your Collar", Kelvin MacKenzie "the sharp little oaf who edits The Sun" and Garry Bushell "that sub-literate homophobic, sniggering rictus of a lout". His talk was published in The Guardian in abbreviated form as "Murdoch's Desolate View of Human Life" Craig Brown described the programme in the (Rupert Murdoch owned) Sunday Times:

"Potter announced at the beginning: 'I'm going to get down there in the gutter where so many journalists crawl... what I'm about to do is to make a provenly vindictive and extremely powerful enemy... the enemy in question is that drivel-merchant, global huckster and so-to-speak media psychopath, Rupert Murdoch... Hannibal the Cannibal.'...

As a performance, it had a lot going for it. I have never seen a talking head on television so immediate or so unabated in its anger. In many ways, it felt like being collared by a madman on the Tube. Filmed disturbingly close to camera, seemingly ad-libbing the entire half-hour, now mumbling, now rasping, Potter somehow managed to cut through the vacuum that on television usually separates viewer from viewee. This made the performance extraordinary."

=== Final works ===
The last serial broadcast during Potter's lifetime was the romantic comedy Lipstick on Your Collar (1993). Set during the Suez Crisis of 1956 like the much earlier Lay Down Your Arms (1970), elements of which it recycled, this six-parter did not become a popular success and in it Potter returned to use of lip-synched musical numbers in the manner of Pennies from Heaven. It helped to launch the career of actor Ewan McGregor.

On 15 March 1994, three months before his death while his health was deteriorating, Potter gave an interview to Melvyn Bragg, later broadcast on 5 April 1994 by Channel 4. He had broken most of his ties with the BBC as a result of his disenchantment with Directors-General Michael Checkland and John Birt. Using a morphine and champagne cocktail as pain relief, and chain smoking, he revealed that he had named his cancer "Rupert", after Rupert Murdoch, who Potter said represented so much of what he found despicable about the mass media in Britain. He described his work and his determination to continue writing until his death. Telling Bragg that he had two works he intended to finish, he proposed that these works, Karaoke and Cold Lazarus, should be made with the rival BBC and Channel 4 working in collaboration, a suggestion which was accepted.

The Bragg TV interview had revealed the "real" Dennis Potter as gentle and thoughtful and the immediate response was intense. The Guardian printed a full transcript the next day while Bragg reported: "Thousands of people reacted with phone calls and letters." Michael Grade, Channel 4’s chief executive, said: "I've never known a reaction to a programme like that, achieving such intimacy with an audience. Nothing stacks up against it in terms of impact."

Potter's final commission came from The Daily Telegraph Arts & Books section, prompted by the TV interview in March, to which he replied on 16 May, after honouring his television commitments: "I am pleased to tell you that I have completed Karaoke and Cold Lazarus – which I regard as essentially one eight-part piece. Now all that effort is of course evaporating into an overwhelming sense of loss, I itch to scribble something." Immediately he was prompted to consider "the prospect of confronting imminent death" and on 25 May he submitted "my first and last short story" titled "Last Pearls", which was published on 4 June, days before he died.

The two related stories, Karaoke and Cold Lazarus, were eventually broadcast in 1996. One set in the present and the other in the far future, both feature Albert Finney as the same principal character. Both series were released on DVD on 6 September 2010.

== Other works ==
=== Novels ===
Hide and Seek (1973) is a meta-fictional novel exploring the relationship between reader and author and contains a protagonist, Daniel Miller, who is convinced he is the plaything of an omniscient author. This concept forms the core of Potter's next two novels, and portions of Hide and Seek would reappear in several of his television plays, especially Follow the Yellow Brick Road (1972) and The Singing Detective.

Ticket to Ride (1986) was written between drafts of The Singing Detective and concerns a herbithologist who is unable to make love to his wife unless he imagines her as a prostitute. This was followed in 1987 by Blackeyes: a study of a model whose abusive uncle, a writer, has stolen details of his niece's experiences in the glamour industry as the basis for his latest potboiler.

To tie in with the release of the MGM production of Pennies from Heaven in 1981, Potter wrote a novelisation of the screenplay. Potter turned down the option of writing a novelisation for the film version of Brimstone and Treacle, allowing his daughter Sarah Potter to write it instead.

=== Stage plays ===
Although Potter only produced one play exclusively for theatrical performance (Sufficient Carbohydrate, 1983 – later filmed for television as Visitors in 1987), he adapted several of his television scripts for the stage. Vote, Vote, Vote for Nigel Barton, which featured material from its sister-play Stand Up, Nigel Barton, was premiered in 1966, while Only Make Believe (1973), which incorporated scenes from Angels Are So Few (1970), made the transition to the stage in 1974. Son of Man appeared in 1969 with Frank Finlay in the title role (Finlay would also play Casanova in Potter's 1971 serial) and was restaged by Northern Stage in 2006. Brimstone and Treacle was adapted for the stage in 1977 after the BBC refused to screen the original television version. The play text for Blue Remembered Hills was first published in the collection Waiting for the Boat (with Joe's Ark and Blade on the Feather) in 1984 and has since enjoyed several successful stage performances. Potter proposed to write an "intermedia" stage play for producers Geisler-Roberdeau based on William Hazlitt's Liber Amoris, or The New Pygmalion, but he died before it could be commenced.

== Style and themes ==
Potter's work is known for its use of non-naturalistic devices. These include the extensive use of flashback and nonlinear plot structure (Casanova; Late Call), direct to camera address (Vote, Vote, Vote for Nigel Barton) and works where "the child is father to the man", in which he used adult actors to play children (Stand Up, Nigel Barton; Blue Remembered Hills). The 'lip-sync' technique he developed for his "serials with songs" (Pennies from Heaven; The Singing Detective and Lipstick on Your Collar) is perhaps the best known of the Potter trademarks. They are frequently used in works where the line between fantasy and reality becomes blurred, often as a result of the influence of popular culture (Willie, the Wild West obsessive played by Hywel Bennett in Where the Buffalo Roam) or from a character's apparent awareness of their status as a pawn in the hands of an omniscient author (the actor Jack Black (Denholm Elliott) in Follow the Yellow Brick Road first broadcast in 1972).

Potter's pioneering method of using music in his work emerged when developing Pennies from Heaven (1978), one of his biggest successes. He asked actors to mime along to period songs. "Potter tried out the concept himself by lip-syncing to old songs while looking into a mirror. Potter himself once revealed that, working on harnessing songs in his plays, he was most productive 'at night, with old Al Bowlly records playing in the background'". Potter had previously experimented with Bowlly's voice in Moonlight on the Highway (1969).

Potter's characters are frequently "doubled up"; either by Doppelgänger, using the same actor to play two roles (Kika Markham as the actress and the escort in Double Dare; Norman Rossington as Lorenzo the gaoler and the English traveller in Casanova) or two actors whose characters' destinies and personalities appear linked (Bob Hoskins and Kenneth Colley as Arthur and the accordion man in Pennies from Heaven; Rufus (Christian Rodska) and Gina the bear in A Beast With Two Backs).

A motif in Potter's writing is the concept of betrayal and this takes many forms in his plays. Sometimes it is personal (Stand Up, Nigel Barton), political (Traitor; Cold Lazarus) and other times it is sexual (A Beast With Two Backs; Brimstone and Treacle). In Potter on Potter, published as part of Faber and Faber's series on auteurs, Potter told editor Graham Fuller that all forms of betrayal presented in literature are essentially religious and based on "the old, old story"; this is evoked in a number of works, from the use of popular songs in Pennies from Heaven to Potter's gnostic retelling of Jesus' final days in Son of Man.

The device of a disruptive outsider entering a claustrophobic environment is another theme. In plays where this occurs, the outsider will commit some apparently liberating act of evil (rape in Brimstone and Treacle) or violence (murder in Shaggy Dog) that gives physical expression to the un-sublimated desires of the characters in that setting. While these more malevolent visitors are often supernatural beings (Angels Are So Few), intelligence agents (Blade on the Feather) or even figments of their host's imagination (Schmoedipus), there are also—rare—instances of benign visitors whose presence resolves personal conflicts rather than exploits them (Joe's Ark; Where Adam Stood).

== Legacy ==
Although Potter won few awards, he was and remains held in high regard by many within the television and film industry and was an influence on such creators as Mark Frost, Steven Bochco, Andrew Davies, Alain Resnais and Peter Bowker. Alan Bennett was critical, referring in his 1998 diaries to a television programme "that took Potter at his own self-evaluation (always high), when there was a good deal of indifferent stuff which was skated over", and believed that Potter's health was a factor in his fame, saying "he visibly conformed to what the public thinks artists ought to be—poor or promiscuous, suffering or starved". BBC Four marked the tenth anniversary of Potter's death in December 2004 with documentaries about his life and work, accompanied by showings of Pennies from Heaven and The Singing Detective, as well as several of his single plays—many of which had not been shown since their initial broadcast. Potter's papers, including unproduced plays and unpublished fiction, are being catalogued and preserved at the Dean Heritage Centre in Gloucestershire.

== Personal life ==
Potter married Margaret Amy Morgan (14 August 1933 – 29 May 1994) on 10 January 1959, at the Christ Church parish church in Berry Hill. They lived at Ross-on-Wye, Herefordshire, and had three children, including the cricketer and writer Sarah Potter.

== Illness and death ==
In 1961, while covering a meeting of the Young Conservatives, Potter was suddenly unable to rise from the press table and his knee felt hot. He was taken to a hospital, where his other major joints became inflamed and swollen, also, and his skin scalded off his body overnight. Potter was diagnosed with psoriatic arthropathy.

On 14 February 1994, Potter experienced more than his usual daily pain. He was told he was suffering from incurable pancreas and liver cancer.

Months before Potter was diagnosed with pancreatic cancer, his wife, Margaret, was diagnosed with breast cancer. Despite his own deteriorating condition and punishing work schedule, Potter continued to care for his wife until she died on 29 May 1994.

Nine days later, on 7 June 1994, Potter died of pancreatic cancer in Ross-on-Wye, Herefordshire, England, at age 59.

== See also ==
- Dennis Potter bibliography
