= Karaoke (TV series) =

1996 British TV drama series

- Created by: Dennis Potter
- Directed by: Renny Rye
- Starring: Albert Finney
- Country of origin: United Kingdom
- No. of episodes: 4

Original release
- Network: BBC1; Channel 4
- Release: 28 April – 19 May 1996

Karaoke is a 1996 British television drama written by Dennis Potter with the knowledge that he was dying from pancreatic cancer.

It forms the first half of a pair with the serial Cold Lazarus. The two plays were filmed as a single production by the same team; both were directed by Renny Rye. The series was said to be inspired by Potter's working relationship with Louise Germaine.

The plays were a co-production between the BBC and rival broadcaster Channel 4, a unique arrangement Potter had expressly requested before his death. The show was first aired on BBC1 on Sunday evenings, with a repeat on Channel 4 the following day.

The series stars Albert Finney, Richard E. Grant, Hywel Bennett, Roy Hudd and Julie Christie and features Saffron Burrows and Keeley Hawes in two early screen appearances.

== Cast ==
- Albert Finney as Daniel Feeld
- Hywel Bennett as Arthur 'Pig' Mailion
- Roy Hudd as Ben Baglin
- Anna Chancellor as Anna Griffiths
- Saffron Burrows as Sandra Sollars
- Richard E. Grant as Nick Balmer
- Keeley Hawes as Linda Langer
- Ian McDiarmid as Oliver Morse
- Natasha McElhone as Angie
- Julie Christie as Lady Ruth Balmer
- Fay Ripley as Club Barmaid
- Simon Donald as Ian
- Liz Smith as Mrs. Baglin
- Alison Steadman as Mrs. Haynes
- Neil Stuke as Peter
- Stephen Boxer as Consultant
- Ewan McGregor as Young Man
- Matthew Cottle as Hospital Doctor
- Ralph Brown as Peter Beasley

== Plot ==
The principal character of Karaoke is Daniel Feeld, an English playwright in late middle-age who is working on the television production of his latest play, itself entitled Karaoke. The play concerns the relationship between a young woman, Sandra Sollars, her boyfriend Peter Beasley and Arthur 'Pig' Mailion, the owner of the sleazy karaoke/hostess bar where Sandra works.

One evening, while sitting in a restaurant, Feeld becomes convinced that a couple at a nearby table who resemble the fictional Sandra and Peter are repeating lines of dialogue from the play. Daniel later encounters the young woman and discovers that her name is indeed Sandra, and that she works in a club owned by one Arthur Mailion. He relates the coincidence to a frightened Sandra, who runs away, leaving behind her handbag. Daniel subsequently relates the story to his agent Ben Baglin and producer Anna Griffiths, who assume that Daniel's apparent paranoia is due to his worsening health through heavy drinking and smoking.

Daniel discovers a small pistol, a credit card and a membership card in Sandra's handbag. After using the membership card to determine her address, he visits her home in order to return the bag, but first removes the pistol. He discovers that Sandra was carrying the pistol because of her intention to avenge a savage attack on her mother carried out by Mailion years earlier. Disturbed by the possibility that the death of the fictional Sandra in his play may come true in real life, Daniel decides to change his play. Meanwhile, having also discovered the existence of the real Mailion, Anna discusses with the play's director, Nick Balmer the possibility of changing Mailion's name in order to avoid litigation.

Nick has been conducting an affair with Linda Langer, the actress who plays Sandra in the film version of Karaoke, but is also the intended victim of a blackmail plot hatched by Linda and Mailion. He dismisses the attempt, is beaten up by Mailion's thugs, and confesses all to his wife, Lady Balmer, with whom he is reconciled.

Daniel is admitted to hospital and told he has only weeks to live. He changes his will, leaving his body to an experimental cryogenics laboratory, and offering a generous portion of his estate to Sandra and her mother, on the condition that Sandra ceases working at the club and renounces her intention to kill Mailion. Sandra agrees, but Daniel remains uneasy about her intentions.

One night, he leaves the hospital, taking the pistol with him, and visits Mailion's club, where he performs a striking version of "Pennies from Heaven" before shooting Mailion dead in his office and arranging an alibi with the unsuspecting Baglin to cover up the murder.
