= Pennies from Heaven (TV series) =

BBC musical drama

- Genre: Drama; Musical
- Written by: Dennis Potter
- Directed by: Piers Haggard
- Starring: Bob Hoskins; Cheryl Campbell; Gemma Craven
- Country of origin: England
- Original language: English
- No. of series: 1
- No. of episodes: 6

Production
- Producer: Kenith Trodd
- Cinematography: Ken Westbury (film inserts)
- Editors: Howard Dell (video tape); David Martin (film inserts)
- Production company: BBC Television

Original release
- Network: BBC 1
- Release: 7 March – 11 April 1978

Related
- Pennies From Heaven (1978); Lipstick on Your Collar (1993)

Pennies from Heaven is a 1978 BBC musical drama serial written by Dennis Potter. The title is taken from the song "Pennies from Heaven" written by Johnny Burke and Arthur Johnston. It was one of several Potter serials (another being The Singing Detective) to mix the reality of the drama with a dark fantasy content, and the earliest of his works where the characters burst into extended performances of popular songs.

== Overview ==
The serial was directed by Piers Haggard and produced by frequent Potter collaborator Kenith Trodd. Bob Hoskins became an established actor in the United Kingdom following his role in this serial. (Note: "Pennies From Heaven launched Mr Hoskins into leading-man parts in British films"; "Hoskins drew national attention ... in the 1978 BBC miniseries Pennies From Heaven.") It also featured Nigel Havers as Conrad Baker (the suave salesman), Jenny Logan as Irene (Joan's friend), Freddie Jones as Mr Warner (Eileen's headmaster), Michael Bilton as Eileen's dad, Tudor Davies as the cafe customer (Davies was also choreographer for the series), and Peter Bowles as the Prosecuting Counsel.

Pennies was the last of Potter's television dramas to be filmed in the 'hybrid' format of studio videotape and location 16 mm film. The production involved six weeks of filming on location, most of it in Oxfordshire, with selected shooting in the Forest of Dean (in Potter's home county of Gloucestershire, between the River Severn and the River Wye). The school where Eileen teaches is the Forest school Potter attended in Berry Hill and the children who populate the school scenes were local children cast as extras. In temporary remission from his chronic condition of psoriatic arthropathy, a rare skin and joints disease that first afflicted him at the age of 24, Potter and his wife Margaret were able to visit the location shoot in Dean.

Pennies... was transmitted in six episodes of approximately 75 minutes each from 7 March to 11 April 1978, on BBC1 and first repeated later that year. Roughly five million viewers watched the first episode, and by episode three this had risen to seven million. In spring of the following year, Pennies won the British Academy Television Award for Most Original Programme (Hoskins and Campbell were also nominated for BAFTA acting awards). In a 2000 poll of industry professionals conducted by the British Film Institute to find the 100 Greatest British Television Programmes of the 20th century, Pennies from Heaven was placed at number 21.

== Legacy ==
The original television version was released on DVD by BBC Worldwide in 2004. The first and sixth episodes have an audio commentary from Haggard and Trodd.

Potter's memorial service in November 1994 at St James's Church in Piccadilly began with those in attendance singing "Roll Along Prairie Moon" to the accompaniment of a jazz quintet. Cheryl Campbell and Freddie Jones read their scene in the schoolroom from Pennies: "As Jones stifled his tears, Campbell said: 'Nobody ever ever stops yearning' ... In a comic interlude Michael Grade, chief executive of Channel 4, Alan Yentob, controller of BBC1, and Kenith Trodd, Potter's producer, read a scene from Pennies. [And Trodd] told of their last meeting before the playwright's death from cancer: 'Dennis slugging Courvoisier, fortified by liquid heroin and morphine ... after an hour he seemed to crumple and he said, 'I do have one very real fear of death. It is that you might get asked to speak at my memorial service'."

== Episodes ==
No.	Title	Original release date
1	"Down Sunnyside Lane"	7 March 1978
In the mid-1930s, Arthur and Joan Parker (Bob Hoskins and Gemma Craven) are an incompatible married couple living in the London suburbs. Arthur, a travelling sheet music salesman, is a passionate man who is frustrated by his wife's domestic nature. On a car journey to the Gloucester area he picks up 'the accordion man', a vagrant (Kenneth Colley) who invariably busks on the instrument in the vicinity of the other characters, but the signs of the man's mental illness soon lead Arthur to reject him after they spend several hours together. While trying to persuade a shopkeeper (Arnold Peters) to take some of his goods, Arthur notices a female customer with whom he immediately becomes besotted. Arthur and 'the accordion man' both manage to frighten the young woman. Before returning to London, Arthur has sex with Marjorie (Rosemary Martin), a Gloucestershire prostitute, in the back of his car.
2	"The Sweetest Thing"	14 March 1978
Arthur's bank manager (Peter Cellier) refuses to give him a loan. Eileen Everson (Cheryl Campbell), the woman he encountered, is a junior school teacher in the Forest of Dean who lives with her widowed coal mining father and two brothers, also miners. Meanwhile, Arthur has returned to the area to trace the woman with whom he is obsessed. He finally encounters Eileen in a wood near the Eversons' cottage, and returns to their home where Arthur claims his wife has died in a motorcycle accident. He and Eileen eventually make love after the rest of the household have gone to bed.
3	"Easy Come, Easy Go"	21 March 1978
The Parkers' marriage briefly revives after Joan smears lipstick on her nipples, and appears to respond to some of her husband's sexual fantasies. Joan is persuaded to use her inheritance to finance Arthur's desire to open a record shop. Meanwhile, Eileen has discovered she is pregnant and is forced to give up her job. After unexpectedly meeting a young blind girl (Yolande Palfrey) in a field, whom he lusts after under his breath, Arthur reappears at the Everson family home, and his relationship with Eileen revives. The blind girl is raped and murdered, for which Arthur is arrested, but soon released. Eileen moves to London, and loses contact with Arthur again.
4	"Better Think Twice"	28 March 1978
Almost destitute, Eileen eats little and is in arrears for her cheap hotel room. She meets the superficially sympathetic Tom (Hywel Bennett), a wealthy man with no obvious occupation, and becomes dependent upon him. Arthur opens his new record shop, but he has very few customers, an exception being Tom. The two men get along very well, and Arthur delivers some records to the apartment where Eileen is recovering from an (illegal) abortion paid for by Tom, but the couple are not reunited. Arthur later glimpses Eileen in the pub where she had met Tom, and they leave for the record shop. Unaware of Arthur's connection to Tom, Eileen explains that the man who paid for her abortion now has a hold over her, and he intends to be her pimp. The couple decide they have to escape from London, and shatter Arthur's stock of fragile shellac discs.
5	"Painting the Clouds"	4 April 1978
A police inspector (Dave King) visits Joan after Arthur's unexplained disappearance and the destruction of his retail stock. Her comments about Arthur's sexual tastes, particularly his wish for his wife to move around the house without wearing her knickers, lead the police to make a connection with the murder of the blind girl whose undergarment had been removed. 'The accordion man' is haunted by her image and his responsibility for the murder. (It is clear he is not delusional over this event.) He is disorientated when running into Eileen while she is street walking; the dead girl bears a resemblance to her. Arthur is now living off Eileen's immoral earnings, and she is a client of a Conservative MP, Major Archibald Paxville (Ronald Fraser), who she unsuccessfully attempts to blackmail. 'The accordion man' commits suicide, probably by throwing himself off Hammersmith Bridge (which also features ominously in The Singing Detective), and his corpse is discovered. Arthur and Eileen's false optimism for the future is dashed when they see a newspaper headline indicating he is wanted for murder.
6	"Says My Heart"	11 April 1978
Arthur and Eileen are on the run. They spend the night in a barn, but Eileen's attempt to find help eventually leads her to shoot dead a lonely and deranged farmer (Philip Locke). They feed and clean themselves in his farmhouse, and scavenge through the man's possessions for money and things they can sell. Leaving the farm, Arthur stops, thinking he has seen 'the accordion man', but cannot restart their stolen car. Passing police take the couple in for questioning, and Arthur is charged with the murder of the blind girl. In the Assizes court, inconsistencies in Arthur's accounts, and a witness unwittingly confusing Arthur's fixation on Eileen for an obsession with the blind girl lead to his conviction and execution. After Eileen notes the time set for his hanging has passed, Arthur reappears and a happy ending is announced by the two characters.

== Film adaptation ==
In 1981, the series was adapted as a film, starring Steve Martin. Potter adapted his own screenplay, and Herbert Ross directed. Potter was nominated for the 1981 Academy Award for Writing Adapted Screenplay. According to the Los Angeles Herald Examiner, Metro-Goldwyn-Mayer had him rewrite the script nine times, though The Sunday Times reported this as thirteen; Kenith Trodd remembered a "dozen or so drafts". The movie features Bernadette Peters (as Eileen), Christopher Walken (as Tom) and Vernel Bagneris (as 'the accordion man'). It was not successful at the box office, grossing only $9 million from a $22 million budget.

MGM required Potter to buy back his copyright from the BBC (who demanded $100,000 plus half of any profits from the film); the deal prevented broadcast of the original production of Pennies for approximately ten years. In 1989, the BBC was able to regain the rights from MGM for what Trodd called 'a very inconsiderable sum', and rebroadcast Pennies in a six-week run beginning February 1990.

== See also ==
- Al Bowlly, singer used extensively throughout the series.

== Bibliography ==
- Carpenter, Humphrey (1998). Dennis Potter: A Biography. Faber and Faber. ISBN 0571197213.
- Gilbert, W. Stephen (1995). Fight and Kick and Bite: The Life and Work of Dennis Potter. Hodder & Stoughton. ISBN 0340640472.
