= British Academy Television Award for Best Single Drama =

British television award

British Academy Television Award
- Country: United Kingdom
- Presented by: British Academy of Film and Television Arts
- First award: 1983
- Currently held by: I Am... Ruth (2023)
- Website: http://www.bafta.org/

The British Academy Television Award for Best Single Drama was one of the major categories of the British Academy Television Awards (BAFTAs), the primary awards ceremony of the British television industry. According to the BAFTA website, the category was for "a single, self-contained drama.", this "includes single films which form part of an anthology series, where each episode has a self-contained story. The same characters cannot appear in a later episode." It was awarded as Best Single Play from 1973 to 1983. Prior to that, there was a sole category for Drama Production.

In 2024, the category was merged with the Best Drama Mini-Series award into one category titled Best Limited Drama.

== Winners and nominees ==
=== 1970s ===
Year	Title	Recipient(s)
1973	Stocker's Copper	Jack Gold
1973	The Resistible Rise Of Arturo Ui	Jack Gold
1973	To Encourage the Others	Alan Clarke
1974	Kisses at Fifty	Michael Apted
1974	Alice Through The Looking Glass	James MacTaggart
1974	Country Matters: The Little Farm	Silvio Narizzano
1974	Mrs Palfrey at the Claremont/Wessex Tales: The Withered Arm	Michael Lindsay-Hogg
1975	Antony and Cleopatra	Jon Scoffield
1975	Catholics	Jack Gold
1975	God Bless Thee Jackie Madison	Jack Gold
1975	Mr Axelford's Angel	John Frankau
1975	Robinson Crusoe	James MacTaggart
1976	The Evacuees	Alan Parker
1976	Shades of Greene: Cheap In August	Alvin Rakoff
1976	Eighty-Four Charing Cross Road	Mark Cullingham
1976	Just Another Saturday	John Mackenzie
1976	The Naked Civil Servant	Jack Gold
1977	Bar Mitzvah Boy	Michael Tuchner
1977	Billion Dollar Bubble	Brian Gibson
1977	Ready When You Are Mr McGill	Mike Newell
1977	Rogue Male	Clive Donner
1978	Spend, Spend, Spend	John Goldschmidt
1978	A Good Human Story/Philby, Burgess And Maclean	Gordon Flemyng
1978	Jesus of Nazareth	Franco Zeffirelli
1978	Professional Foul	Michael Lindsay-Hogg
1979	Licking Hitler	David Hare
1979	Me, I'm Afraid of Virginia Woolf	Stephen Frears
1979	The One and Only Phyllis Dixey	Michael Tuckner
1979	Thank You Comrades	Jack Gold

=== 1980s (as Best Single Play) ===
Year	Title	Recipient(s)
1980	Blue Remembered Hills	Brian Gibson
1980	Churchill and the Generals	Alan Gibson
1980	The Knowledge	Bob Brooks
1980	Suez 1956	Michael Darlow
1981	Caught on a Train	Peter Duffell
1981	Blade on the Feather	Richard Loncraine
1981	Cream In My Coffee	Gavin Millar
1981	Staying On	Silvio Narizzano
1982	Going Gently	Stephen Frears
1982	A Sense of Freedom	John Mackenzie
1982	The Potting Shed	David Cunliffe
1982	United Kingdom	Roland Joffé

=== 1980s ===
Year	Title	Recipient(s)
1983	The Ballroom of Romance	Pat O'Connor
1983	P'tang, Yang, Kipperbang	Michael Apted
1983	A Voyage Round My Father	Alvin Rakoff
1983	Walter	Stephen Frears
1984	An Englishman Abroad	John Schlesinger
1984	The Country Girls	Desmond Davis
1984	Orwell On Jura	John Glenister
1984	Saigon: Year of the Cat	Stephen Frears
1984	To The Lighthouse	Colin Gregg
1985	Threads	Mick Jackson
1985	Doctor Fischer of Geneva	Michael Lindsay-Hogg
1985	The Ebony Tower	Robert Knights
1985	Oxbridge Blues	James Cellan Jones
1986	Shadowlands	Norman Stone, David M. Thompson
1986	The Browning Version	Michael Simpson, Shaun Sutton
1986	Monsignor Quixote	Rodney Bennett, Christopher Neame
1986	Silas Marner	Giles Foster, Louis Marks
1987	Screen Two: "Hotel du Lac"	Sue Birtwistle, Giles Foster
1987	Drums Along Balmoral Drive	Brenda Reid, Jane Howell
1987	The Good Doctor Bodkin Adams	Innes Lloyd, Richard Stroud
1987	Screen Two: "The Insurance Man"	Innes Lloyd, Richard Eyre
1987	London's Burning	Paul Knight, Les Blair
1987	Past Caring	Kenith Trodd, Richard Eyre
1988	Lifestory	Mick Jackson
1988	Screen Two: "After Pilkington"	Christopher Morahan, Kenith Trodd
1988	Blunt	John Glenister, Martin Thompson
1988	Screen Two: "East of Ipswich"	Tristram Powell, Innes Lloyd
1989	Tumbledown	Charles Wood, Richard Broke, Richard Eyre
1989	Talking Heads: "Bed Among the Lentils"	Alan Bennett, Innes Lloyd
1989	Talking Heads: "A Lady of Letters"	Alan Bennett, Innes Lloyd, Giles Foster
1989	Screen Two: "Sweet As You Are"	William Nicholson, Ruth Caleb, Angela Pope

=== 1990s ===
Year	Title	Recipient(s)	Broadcaster
1990	Screen One: "The Accountant"	Geoffrey Case, Paul Knight, Les Blair	BBC One
1990	First and Last	Michael Frayn, Michael Wearing, Alan Dossor	BBC One
1990	Bomber Harris	Don Shaw, Innes Lloyd, Michael Darlow	BBC One
1990	Screen One: "She's Been Away"	Stephen Poliakoff, Kenith Trodd, Peter Hall	BBC One
1991	Screen One: "News Hounds"	Les Blair, Sarah Curtis	BBC One
1991	Screen Two: "Old Flames"	Simon Gray, Kenith Trodd, Christopher Morahan	BBC Two
1991	Screen One: "Can You Hear Me Thinking?"	Monty Haltrecht, Beverley Marcus, Ruth Caleb, Christopher Morahan	BBC One
1991	Shoot to Kill	Michael Eaton, Nigel Stafford-Clark, Peter Kosminsky	ITV
1991	The Widowmaker	Jeremy Brock, Deirdre Keir, John Madden	ITV
1992	Screen One: "A Question of Attribution"	Alan Bennett, Innes Lloyd, John Schlesinger	BBC One
1992	Screen Two: "102 Boulevard Haussmann"	Alan Bennett, Innes Lloyd, Udayan Prasad	BBC Two
1992	The Trials of Oz	Geoffrey Robertson, Simon Curtis, Sheree Folkson	BBC Two
1992	Screen One: "Hancock"	William Humble, Paul Marcus, Tony Smith	BBC One
1993	An Ungentlemanly Act	Bradley Adams, Stuart Urban	BBC Two
1993	Screen Two: "The Grass Arena"	Ruth Baumgarten, Gillies MacKinnon, Frank Deasy	BBC Two
1993	A Doll's House	Simon Curtis, David Thacker, Joan Tindale	BBC Two
1993	Screen Two: "Memento Mori"	Louis Marks, Jack Clayton, Alan Kelley, Jeanie Sims	BBC Two
1994	ScreenPlay: "Safe"	David M. Thompson, Antonia Bird, Al Ashton	BBC Two
1994	Screen Two: "The Clothes in the Wardrobe"	Norma Heyman, Waris Hussein, Martin Sherman	BBC Two
1994	Screen Two: "The Snapper"	Lynda Myles, Stephen Frears, Roddy Doyle	BBC Two
1994	Screen One: "Wide-Eyed and Legless"	David Lascelles, Richard Loncraine, Jack Rosenthal	BBC One
1995	Screen Two: "Skallagrigg"	John Chapman, Richard Spence, Nigel Williams	BBC Two
1995	The Dying of the Light	Peter Kosminsky, Hossein Amini	ITV
1995	Screen One: "A Breed of Heroes"	Andrée Molyneux, Diarmuid Lawrence, Charles Wood	BBC One
1995	Screen One: "Pat and Margaret"	Ruth Caleb, Gavin Millar, Victoria Wood	BBC One
1995	Stages: "Suffer the Little Children"	Jack Emery, Betsan Morris-Evans	BBC Two
1996	Screen Two: "Persuasion"	Fiona Finlay, Roger Michell, Nick Dear	BBC Two
1996	Eleven Men Against Eleven	Jimmy Mulville, Andy Hamilton	Channel 4
1996	Go Now	Andrew Eaton, Michael Winterbottom, Paul Henry Powell, Jimmy McGovern	BBC One
1996	Heroes And Villains: The Last Englishman	Sue Vertue, John Henderson, Anthony Horowitz	BBC One
1997	Hillsborough	Nicola Shindler, Charles McDougall, Jimmy McGovern, Katy Jones	ITV
1997	Screen Two: "Crossing The Floor"	Guy Jenkin, Lissa Evans	BBC Two
1997	Screen Two: "The Precious Blood"	Robert Cooper, Anthony Rowe, John Woods, Graham Reid	BBC Two
1997	Some Kind of Life	Bill Boyes, Julian Jarrold, Kay Mellor	ITV
1998	No Child of Mine	Peter Kosminsky, Guy Hibbert	ITV
1998	Breaking the Code	Jack Emery, Herbert Wise, Hugh Whitemore	BBC Four
1998	Bumping the Odds	Ian Madden, Rob Rohrer, Rona Munro	BBC Scotland
1998	The Acid House: "The Granton Star Cause"	David Muir, Alex Usbourne, Paul McGuigan, Irvine Welsh	Channel 4
1999	A Rather English Marriage	Joanna Willett, Paul Seed, Andrew Davies	BBC Two
1999	A Life for a Life: The True Story of Stefan Kiszko	Malcolm Craddock, Stephen Whittaker, Peter Berry	ITV
1999	Talking Heads: "Playing Sandwiches"	Mark Shivas, Udayan Prasad, Alan Bennett	BBC One
1999	Talking Heads: "Waiting for the Telegram"	Mark Shivas, Stuart Burge, Alan Bennett	BBC One

=== 2000s ===
Year	Title	Recipient(s)	Broadcaster
2000	The Murder of Stephen Lawrence	Mark Redhead, Paul Greengrass	ITV
2000	Dockers	Sally Hibbin, Bill Anderson, Jimmy McGovern	Channel 4
2000	Lost for Words	Sita Williams, Alan JW Bell, Deric Longden	ITV
2000	Sex 'N' Death	Jane Featherstone, Guy Jenkin	BBC One
2001	Care	Kieran Prendiville, Antonia Bird, Louise Panton, Ruth Caleb	BBC One
2001	Donovan Quick	Sue Austen, David Blair, Donna Franceschild	BBC Two
2001	Nice Girl	Ruth Caleb, Dominic Savage	BBC Two
2001	Storm Damage	Ian Madden, Simon Cellan Jones, Lennie James	BBC Two
2002	When I Was 12	Ruth Caleb, Dominic Savage	BBC Two
2002	My Beautiful Son	Jeff Pope, Bob Mills, Paul Seed, Tim Kazurinsky	ITV
2002	Othello	Anne Pivcevic, Julie Gardner, Geoffrey Sax, Andrew Davies	ITV
2002	The Navigators	Rebecca O’Brien, Ken Loach, Rob Dawber	Channel 4
2003	Conspiracy		BBC Two/HBO
2003	Bloody Sunday	Mark Redhead, Paul Greengrass	ITV
2003	Flesh and Blood	Derek Wax, Julian Farino, Peter Bowker	BBC Two
2003	Tomorrow La Scala!	Ruth Caleb, Chris Collins, Francesca Joseph	BBC Two
2004	The Deal	Christine Langan, Stephen Frears, Peter Morgan	Channel 4
2004	The Canterbury Tales: "The Wife of Bath"	Kate Bartlett, Andy De Emmony, Sally Wainwright	BBC One
2004	Danielle Cable: Eyewitness		ITV
2004	This Little Life	Stewart Mackinnon, Sarah Gavron, Rosemary Kay	BBC Two
2005	Omagh	Ed Guiney, Paul Greengrass, Pete Travis, Guy Hibbert	Channel 4
2005	Dirty Filthy Love	Christine Langan, Adrian Shergold, Jeff Pope, Ian Puleston-Davies	ITV
2005	Hawking	Jessica Pope, Peter Moffat, Philip Martin	BBC Two
2005	Not Only But Always	Alison Jackson, Terry Johnson, Charles Pattinson, George Faber	Channel 4
2006	The Government Inspector	David Aukin, Jonathan Curling, Peter Kosminsky	Channel 4
2006	ShakespeaRe-Told: "Much Ado About Nothing"	Diederick Santer, Brian Percival, David Nicholls	BBC One
2006	The Queen's Sister	Kath Mattock, Simon Cellan Jones, Craig Warner	Channel 4
2006	Red Dust		BBC Two
2007	Housewife, 49	Victoria Wood, Piers Wenger, Gavin Millar, David Threlfall	ITV
2007	Kenneth Williams: Fantabulosa!	Andy De Emmony, Ben Evans, Martyn Hesford	BBC Four
2007	Longford	Peter Morgan, Tom Hooper, Helen Flint, Andy Harries	Channel 4
2007	The Road to Guantánamo	Michael Winterbottom, Mat Whitecross	Channel 4
2008	The Mark of Cain	Tony Marchant, Nicola Shindler, Lynn Horsford, Marc Munden	Channel 4
2008	Boy A	John Crowley, Lynn Horsford, Mark O'Rowe	Channel 4
2008	Coming Down the Mountain	Greg Brenman, Roanna Benn, Mark Haddon, Julie Anne Robinson	BBC One
2008	The Trial of Tony Blair	Alistair Beaton, Simon Cellan Jones, Hal Vogel, David Aukin	More4
2009	White Girl	Hettie Macdonald, Abi Morgan, Andrew Woodhead	BBC Two
2009	Hancock and Joan	Richard Cottan, Richard Laxton, Simon Heath	BBC Four
2009	Einstein and Eddington	George Faber, Mark Pybus, Peter Moffat, Philip Martin	BBC Two
2009	The Shooting of Thomas Hurndall	Simon Block, Rowan Joffé, Barney Reisz, Charles Furneaux	Channel 4

=== 2010s ===
Year	Title	Recipient(s)	Broadcaster
2010	The Unloved	Samantha Morton, Tony Grisoni, Kate Ogborn, Andrew Eaton	Channel 4
2010	Five Minutes of Heaven	Guy Hibbert, Oliver Hirschbiegel, Eoin O'Callaghan, Stephen Wright	BBC Two
2010	Mo	Jeff Pope, Neil McKay, Lisa Gilchrist, Philip Martin	Channel 4
2010	A Short Stay in Switzerland	Liz Trubridge, Simon Curtis, Frank McGuinness, Ruth Caleb	BBC One
2011	The Road to Coronation Street		BBC Four
2011	Eric and Ernie	Victoria Wood, Peter Bowker, Tim Bricknell, Jonny Campbell	BBC Two
2011	I Am Slave	Andrea Calderwood, Gabriel Range, Jeremy Brock	Channel 4
2011	The Special Relationship		BBC Two
2012	Random	Polly Leys, Kate Norrish, Debbie Tucker Green	Channel 4
2012	Holy Flying Circus	Owen Harris, Polly Leys, Kate Norrish, Tony Roche	BBC Four
2012	Page Eight	David Barron, David Hare, David Heyman, Bill Nighy	BBC Two
2012	Stolen	Stephen Butchard, Justin Chadwick, Rebecca Hodgson, Sita Williams	BBC One
2013	Murder	Robert Jones, Birger Larsen, Kath Mattock	BBC Two
2013	Everyday	Michael Winterbottom, Melissa Parmenter, Laurence Coriat, Andrew Eaton	Channel 4
2013	The Girl	Julian Jarrold, Gwyneth Hughes, Amanda Jenks, Leanne Klein	BBC Two
2013	The Hollow Crown: "Richard II"	Rupert Goold, Pippa Harris, Sam Mendes, Rupert Ryle-Hodges	BBC Two
2014	Complicit	Guy Hibbert, Niall MacCormick, Kevin Toolis, Jolyon Symonds	Channel 4
2014	The Wipers Times	David Parfitt, Andy De Emmony, Ian Hislop, Nick Newman	BBC Two
2014	An Adventure in Space and Time	Mark Gatiss, Matt Strevens, Terry McDonough, Caroline Skinner	BBC Two
2014	Black Mirror: "Be Right Back"	Barney Reisz, Charlie Brooker, Owen Harris, Annabel Jones	Channel 4
2015	Marvellous	Peter Bowker, Julian Farino, Katie Swinden, Patrick Spence	BBC Two
2015	Common	Jimmy McGovern, David Blair, Colin McKeown, Donna Molloy	BBC One
2015	Murdered by My Boyfriend	Pier Wilkie, Regina Moriarty, Paul Andrew Williams, Darren Kemp	BBC Three
2015	A Poet in New York	Aisling Walsh, Ruth Caleb, Andrew Davies, Griff Rhys Jones	BBC Two
2016	Don't Take My Baby	Jack Thorne, Ben Anthony, Pier Wilkie, Aysha Rafaele	BBC Three
2016	The C Word	Susan Hogg, Simon Lewis, Nicole Taylor, Tim Kirkby	BBC One
2016	The Go-Between	Claire Bennett, Susan Hogg, Adrian Hodges, Pete Travis	BBC One
2016	Cyberbully	Richard Bond, Ben Chanan, David Lobatto, Leah Cooper	Channel 4
2017	Damilola, Our Loved Boy	Levi David Addai, Euros Lyn, Susan Horth, Colin Barr	BBC One
2017	Murdered by My Father	Bruce Goodison, Toby Welch, Vinay Patel, Aysha Rafaele	BBC Three
2017	Aberfan: The Green Hollow	Pip Broughton, Bethan Jones, Jenna Robbins, Owen Sheers	BBC One
2017	NW		BBC Two
2018	Murdered for Being Different	Aysha Rafaele, Scott Bassett, Paul Andrew Williams, Nick Leather	BBC Three
2018	Against the Law	Aysha Rafaele, Scott Bassett, Fergus O'Brien, Brian Fillis	BBC Two
2018	King Charles III	Mike Bartlett, Greg Brenman, Rupert Goold, Simon Maloney	BBC Two
2018	Black Mirror: "Hang the DJ"	Charlie Brooker, Annabel Jones, Tim Van Patten, Nick Pitt	Netflix
2019	Killed by My Debt	Joseph Bullman, Tahsin Güner, Chris Clough, Aysha Rafaele	BBC Three
2019	Black Mirror: "Bandersnatch"	Charlie Brooker, Annabel Jones, David Slade, Russell McLean	Netflix
2019	Care	Donna Molloy, Colin McKeown, Gillian Juckes, David Blair	BBC One
2019	Through the Gates (On The Edge)	Lisa Walters, Stella Corradi, Georgia Christou, Ben Bickerton	Channel 4

=== 2020s ===
Year	Title	Recipient(s)	Broadcaster
2020	The Left Behind	Alan Harris, Joseph Bullman, Aysha Rafaele, Tracie Simpson	BBC Three
2020	Brexit: The Uncivil War		Channel 4
2020	Elizabeth is Missing	Andrea Gibb, Aisling Walsh, Sarah Brown, Chrissy Skinns	BBC One
2020	Responsible Child		BBC Two
2021	Sitting in Limbo		BBC One
2021	BBW (On the Edge)	Ben Bickerton, Philip Trethowan, Lisa Walters, William Stefan Smith, Yolanda Mercy	Channel 4
2021	Anthony	Jimmy McGovern, Colin McKeown, Donna Molloy, Terry McDonough	BBC One
2021	The Windermere Children	Eleanor Greene, Leanne Klein, Tim Rostock, Simon Block, Michael Samuels, Alison Sterling	BBC Two
2022	Together		BBC Two
2022	Help		Channel 4
2022	I Am... Victoria	Dominic Savage, Krishnendu Majumdar, Richard Yee, Suranne Jones, Josh Hyams, David Charap	Channel 4
2022	Death of England: Face to Face	Clint Dyer, Dixie Linder, David Sabel, Rufus Norris, Christine Schwarzman, Roy Williams	Sky Arts
2023	I Am... Ruth	Dominic Savage, Krishnendu Majumdar, Josh Hyams, Kate Winslet, Richard Yee, David Charap	Channel 4
2023	The House	Paloma Baeza, Niki Lindroth von Bahr, Emma de Swaef, Marc James Roels, Charlotte Bavasso, Christopher O'Reilly	Netflix
2023	Life and Death in the Warehouse	Joseph Bullman, Helen Black, Tracie Simpson, Aysha Rafaele, Tim Hodges, Steve Lawes	BBC Three

- Note: The series that don't have recipients on the tables had Production team credited as recipients for the award or nomination.
