= Helen Black (writer) =

English screenwriter and novelist

- Occupations: Screenwriter, author
- Known for: Life and Death in the Warehouse

Helen Black is a British screenwriter and novelist, best known for her work on the BBC drama Time and the film Life and Death in the Warehouse.

== Career ==
Black grew up in Pontefract, West Yorkshire. She studied Law at Hull University and worked as a solicitor for many years, with a specialty in childcare. Her experiences would inspire her to write a series of legal thriller novels, centering on lawyer Lily Valentine, beginning with Damaged Goods (2005). In 2017, Black won the Kudos North Award, for her television script Galaxy. This success led to her acquiring an agent and then writing on series such as Clink, Death in Paradise and Grantchester.

In 2022, BBC Three aired Black's film Life and Death in the Warehouse, about a pair of women working exploitative conditions in a distribution centre. Black had met Aysha Rafaele and Marco Crivellari at BBC Studios, at first developing a legal drama series. Subsequently, she was asked to work on a factual drama with director Joe Bullman, drawing from his research into the lives and mistreatment of British warehouse employees. The film was nominated at the 2022 BAFTA Cymru Awards for Television Drama.

Black co-wrote the second series of Time with Jimmy McGovern, set in a women's prison. On Nov 6, 2023, it was announced that Black would adapt her 'Lily Valentine' books for television. On Nov 27, 2023, it was announced that Black would write the mystery-thriller The Wives for Channel 5.

== Filmography ==
Year	Title	Notes	Broadcaster
2019	Clink	1 episode	5Star
2021	Death in Paradise	1 episode	BBC One
2022	Life and Death in the Warehouse	TV Movie	BBC Three
2023	Grantchester	1 episode	ITV
2023	Time	3 episodes	BBC One
2024	The Wives	Creator, 4 episodes	Channel 5
2024	Joan	1 episode	ITV
TBA	Lilly Valentine	Creator	TBA

== Novels ==
Series	Year	Title
Lilly Valentine	2008	Damaged Goods
Lilly Valentine	2008	Place of Safety
Lilly Valentine	2009	Dishonour
Lilly Valentine	2011	Blood Rush
Lilly Valentine	2013	Dark Spaces
Lilly Valentine	2015	Friendless Lane
–	2012	Twenty Twelve
Liberty Chapman	2017	Taking Liberties
Liberty Chapman	2018	Bang to Rights
Liberty Chapman	2019	Playing Dirty
Liberty Chapman	2020	Hard as Nails
