= Alan Harris (playwright) =

Welsh playwright and television writer

Alan Harris is a Welsh playwright and television writer.

== Career ==
Has written plays for theatres throughout the United Kingdom, including Paines Plough and National Theatre Wales.

He won a Judges’ Award at the 2015 Bruntwood Prize for his play How My Light is Spent at the Royal Exchange, Manchester. He also wrote The Opportunity of Efficiency, the first international collaboration for National Theatre Wales with the New National Theatre Tokyo. The play was staged at the New National Theatre Tokyo's The Pit stage in 2013 and was directed by NTW artistic director John McGrath.

In 2011 he set up liveartshow, a company specialising in new theatre with music with director Martin Constantine and composer Harry Blake. The company staged Manga Sister, a contemporary dance opera, at The Yard, London and the same venue staged a re-telling of Rhinegold by the same company in 2012. Liveartshow also presented The Future For Beginners, a co-production with the Wales Millennium Centre, at Summerhall at the Edinburgh Fringe Festival in 2014 along with a national tour. The production won a Musical Theatre Network Award while at Edinburgh.

International work includes Marsha at the Capital Fringe Festival in Washington DC and A Scythe of Time, a collaboration with United States composer Mark Swanson.

He wrote the television drama The Left Behind for BBC Three / BBC Studios which won the BAFTA for Best Single Drama in 2020 as well as the Royal Television Society award in the same category. It also won the Television Drama award at the British Academy Cymru Awards (BAFTA Cymru).

Radio plays include The Gold Farmer for BBC Radio 3's The Wire season and plays for BBC Radio 4.

His debut stage play, Orange, was commissioned and produced by Sgript Cymru. He also was the playwriter for the bbc radio series 'Curious under the stars' which was broadcast on bbc radio 4extra for several years.

In 2025 he won the Frank Hopkins Trophy.

He is the winner of a Creative Wales Award from the Arts Council of Wales and represented by Emily Hickman at The Agency, London.
