= Shelagh McLeod =

Canadian actress

- Born: 7 May 1960 (age 66); Vancouver, British Columbia, Canada
- Other names: -Shelagh MacLeod -Sheleigh McCleod
- Occupation: Actress

Shelagh McLeod, sometimes credited as Shelagh MacLeod or Sheleigh McCleod, is a British-based Canadian film and television actress.

== Early life and education ==
McLeod was born in Vancouver, British Columbia, Canada. At the age of five, she immigrated to the United Kingdom.

At age 14, McLeod started training at the Corona Stage Academy in London, United Kingdom.

== Career ==
In the U.K., her first television appearance was as "Young Jean" in Cream in My Coffee, written by Dennis Potter. She then appeared in various television series including Wish Me Luck and Agatha Christie's Poirot, before relocating to work in Canada and Los Angeles, California. where she appeared in series such as The A-Team and Almost Grown.

In 1990s she did a commercial for Whiskas.

Since returning to the U.K., McLeod has appeared in recurring roles on various television series including as Dr. Kate Preston in Peak Practice, Sally Campbell in The Bill, and Jenny Clayton in Doctors.

In 2009, she appeared as Matron Judith Marchant on Holby City, a BBC medical drama television series. She continued this role until early 2010, when the character was written out of the show

McLeod's first short film as writer/director, David Rose, was a "2011 Royal Reel Award" winner in the Short Film Competition at the Canada International Film Festival. Run, her second short film, earned her a second Royal Reel Award at Canada International Film Festival 2012 and was short listed for best short film at, Spirit Quest Film Festival 2012, San Luis Obispo International Film Festival 2012 and San Antonio Film Festival 2012. Run screened at the Vancouver International Film Festival in 2012. She wrote and directed Astronaut which starred Richard Dreyfuss and Colm Feore. The film was then screened at the Edinburgh International Film Festival. Her next film NEXUS, was selected for Meryl Streep/Nicole Kidman sponsored The Writers Lab in October 2018.

Her first feature film, The Competition is in development. In 2019 she announced that films such as The Visit and Violet are in the process of having their screens written.

== Personal life ==
McLeod's first marriage to American actor James Jordan took her to America; it ended in divorce.

She then married Marek Pilkington Miksa, a property developer, and returned to the U.K. They have one child.
