= Killed by My Debt =

2018 BBC television film

- Written by: Tahsin Güner
- Directed by: Joseph Bullman
- Starring: Chance Perdomo; Craig Parkinson; Steve Toussaint; Juliet Cowan; Calvin Demba; Tom Walker
- Country of origin: United Kingdom
- Original language: English

Original release
- Network: BBC Three
- Release: 2018

Killed by My Debt is a 2018 BBC Three drama film based on the life of Jerome Rogers who died by suicide aged twenty, having accrued debts of over £1,000. The debt was executed by Andrew Maughan of The London Borough of Camden, & Mike Marrs of Marston Holdings Ltd, stemming from two unpaid £65 traffic fines. The film was written by Tahsin Güner who worked closely with the Rogers family. Joseph Bullman was the director.

== Background ==
The film is based on the true story of Jerome Rogers (1995-2016). The practices of real-life organisations CitySprint couriers, Newlyn & Marston Holdings Ltd debt collection agency, and Camden Borough Council are depicted.

== Cast ==
- Chance Perdomo as Jerome
- Craig Parkinson as the Bailiff
- Juliet Cowan as Tracey Rogers
- Steve Toussaint as Bentley Duncan
- Calvin Demba as Nat Rogers
- Tom Walker as the Controller
- Leonie Elliott as Hollie Rogers
- Tamara Alexander as Cobra presenter
- Owen Brazendale as Honda salesman

== Reception ==
John Dugdale, writing in The Sunday Times, gave a positive review praising Perdomo's performance but expressed reservations about the inserted videos featuring other debtors.

The Guardian called it 'a tale for our times'. Suzi Feay in the Financial Times described Perdomo's performance as 'powerfully empathetic' and the drama as being at times 'painful to view'. Concluding, 'only a traffic-warden with a heart of stone could fail to be moved.'

At the 2019 BAFTA TV Awards, Killed by My Debt won Best Single Drama and Chance Perdomo was nominated for a Best Actor award.
