= Liverpool docks strikes =

Throughout the history of the Liverpool docks, known as Mersey Docks and Harbour Company, there have been numerous strike actions by dock workers, although some have been part of larger industrial action affecting other trades and union workers. The most lengthy and best remembered of contemporary times was the dispute during 1995-1998.

== History of strikes ==
Some examples of industrial actions taken prior to the mid-20th century included the dock strike of 1890 and the 1911 Liverpool general transport strike.

A strike in late 1967 affected Liverpool and Birkenhead, though docks in and around London were also affected. The strike involved around 16,000 workers and caused interference with trade exports, with pay systems a core factor. Just two years later in July 1969, dockers again struck with colleagues from Birkenhead, involving 11,000 men over a dispute regarding handling goods at an Aintree container base. A few years later in 1972, Liverpool dockers joined in a national dock strike to safeguard jobs, protesting against redundancy plans from firms using cheaper casual labour. The longest known dispute, which was technically not a strike as the workforce were all dismissed, was the Liverpool dockers' dispute (1995–98) that ended with settlement pay and a few job reinstatements.

== See also ==
- Docks strike of 1970
