= Liveartshow =

British theatre company

Liveartshow is a company that makes theatre with music and was established by director Martin Constantine, writer Alan Harris and composer Harry Blake. The company works with a wide range of artists from different disciplines.

== Work ==
The company produced its first show, a contemporary dance opera, Manga Sister at The Yard Theatre, London and they returning the following year with an adaptation of Wagner's Rhinegold in 2012. These productions were the centre piece of the Peter Brook Empty Space Award winning season at The Yard Theatre.

In 2014 the company produced The Future For Beginners in collaboration with the Wales Millennium Centre at Summerhall at the Edinburgh Fringe Festival along with a national tour. The production won a Musical Theatre Network Award.

The company staged Marsha; a girl who does bad things as part of the 2015 Grimeborn Festival at the Arcola Theatre, London in 2015.
