= Eton Boating Song =

School song

Song
- Published: 4 June 1863
- Composers: Captain Algernon Drummond (transcribed by T. L. Mitchell-Innes)
- Lyricist: William Johnson Cory

The "Eton Boating Song" is the best known of the school songs associated with Eton College that are sung at the end-of-year concert and on other important occasions. It is also played during the procession of boats. The words of the song were written by William Johnson Cory, an influential master at the school. The melody was composed by an Old Etonian and former pupil of Cory, Captain Algernon Drummond, and transcribed by T. L. Mitchell-Innes. The piano accompaniment was written by Evelyn Wodehouse. It was first performed on 4 June 1863. Ordinarily, only the first, sixth, seventh and eighth stanzas are sung. Contrary to popular belief, the "Eton Boating Song" is not the school song of Eton College, that being "Carmen Etonense".

The song has been the subject of significant parody over the years, and numerous obscene versions exist, the most notable being "The Sexual Life of the Camel".

== Cachet ==
The traditional status of Eton as the training grounds for Britain's wealthy elite endowed the song with a peculiar cultural cachet. For instance, in his autobiographical essay "Such, Such Were the Joys", writer George Orwell – himself an Old Etonian – wrote that:

From the whole decade before 1914 there seems to breathe forth a smell of the more vulgar, un-grown-up kind of luxury, a smell of brilliantine and crème-de-menthe and soft-centred chocolates — an atmosphere, as it were, of eating everlasting strawberry ices on green lawns to the tune of the Eton Boating Song.

== Lyrics ==
Jolly boating weather,
And a hay harvest breeze,
Blade on the feather,
Shade off the trees,
Swing swing together,
With your bodies between your knees,
Swing swing together,
With your bodies between your knees.

Skirting past the rushes,
Ruffling o'er the weeds,
Where the lock stream gushes,
Where the cygnet feeds,
Let us see how the wine-glass flushes,
At supper on Boveney meads,
Let us see how the wine glass flushes,
At supper on Boveney meads.

Thanks to the bounteous sitter,
Who sat not at all on his seat,
Down with the beer that's bitter,
Up with the wine that's sweet,
And Oh that some generous "critter",
Would give us more ducks to eat!

Carving with elbow nudges,
Lobsters we throw behind,
Vinegar nobody grudges,
Lower boys drink it blind,
Sober as so many judges,
We'll give you a bit of our mind.

"Dreadnought" "Britannia" "Thetis",
"St George" "Prince of Wales" and "Ten",
And the eight poor souls whose meat is,
Hard steak, and a harder hen,
But the end of our long boat fleet is,
Defiance to Westminster men.

Harrow may be more clever,
Rugby may make more row,
But we'll row for ever,
Steady from stroke to bow,
And nothing in life shall sever,
The chain that is round us now,
And nothing in life shall sever,
The chain that is round us now.

Others will fill our places,
Dressed in the old light blue,
We'll recollect our races,
We'll to the flag be true,
And youth will be still in our faces,
When we cheer for an Eton crew,
And youth will be still in our faces,
When we cheer for an Eton crew.

Twenty years hence this weather,
May tempt us from office stools,
We may be slow on the feather,
And seem to the boys old fools,
But we'll still swing together,
And swear by the best of schools,
But we'll still swing together,
And swear by the best of schools.

== Other uses ==
The melody of the song was borrowed for the song "Long Live Uncle Tony" for St. Anthony Hall (an American fraternity also known as Delta Psi); the new lyrics were written by the famous travel lecturer and author John L. Stoddard (1850-1931).

In 1939, the tune (at a quicker than usual tempo) was used as the theme for the film A Yank at Eton. In 1962, the tune was adopted by Coventry City Football Club as their club anthem. The lyrics were rewritten by Jimmy Hill and club director John Camkin in order to be relevant to the club, which is still regularly sung by City fans even today. An instrumental big band version of the tune by Ted Heath & His Music has been played regularly on the PA system at Coventry City's home matches.

The song appears in the 1951 comedy film The Lavender Hill Mob, sung by the schoolgirls during the school scene. It also features in the 1953 comedy film The Titfield Thunderbolt and the 1959 adventure film North West Frontier.

The "Eton Boating Song" features in the 1960s television series The Prisoner, in the episodes "The Girl Who Was Death" and "Once Upon a Time".

In the Thunderbirds episode "The Cham-Cham", Parker briefly sings part of the song as he prepares to go boating, before being called out on a mission by Lady Penelope.

The "Eton Boating Song" is briefly sung by the Earl of Gurney during his sanity examination in the play The Ruling Class and its 1972 film adaptation.

It is also played in 1972 comedy film The Adventures of Barry McKenzie in the scene where Mr. Gort, dressed as a schoolboy, urges the bewildered title character to whip him.

The song is sung in the 1980 television drama Blade on the Feather, written by Dennis Potter and which took its title from one of the lines of the song.

A reworked version of the theme appeared as the title music for the satirical 1989 horror movie Society.

In his appearance on Inside the Actors Studio, Hugh Laurie - an Old Etonian - sang, with great embarrassment, the first verse of the "Eton Boating Song"; he also dryly commented on the homoeroticism that can be read into the phrase 'With your bodies between your knees'.

In the second-to-final chapter of The Invisibles, Sir Miles Delacourt sings the song before he hangs himself from the aisles of Westminster Abbey.

During the 2010 British general election the song was parodied as "The Eton Voting Song", with reference to the fact that David Cameron, Boris Johnson and other leading politicians went to Eton.

During the Opening Ceremony of the London 2012 Olympics, the "Eton Boating Song" was briefly played during the introductory film Isles of Wonder, charting the course of the River Thames, as it flows past Eton.
