= Astronaut (2019 film) =

2019 film by Shelagh McLeod

- Poster
- Directed by: Shelagh McLeod
- Written by: Shelagh McLeod
- Produced by: Jessica Adams; Sean Buckley
- Starring: Richard Dreyfuss; Lyriq Bent; Krista Bridges; Richie Lawrence; Graham Greene; Joan Gregson; Jennifer Phipps; Colm Feore
- Cinematography: Scott McClellan
- Edited by: Tiffany Beaudin
- Music by: Virginia Kilbertus
- Production company: JA Productions
- Distributed by: Quiver Distribution
- Release date: June 22, 2019 (Edinburgh International Film Festival)
- Running time: 97 minutes
- Country: Canada
- Language: English

Astronaut is a 2019 Canadian drama film written and directed by Shelagh McLeod and starring Richard Dreyfuss. It is McLeod's first feature-length film.

== Cast ==
- Richard Dreyfuss as Angus
- Lyriq Bent as Jim
- Colm Feore as Marcus
- Krista Bridges as Molly
- Art Hindle as Joe
- Richie Lawrence as Barney
- Graham Greene as Len
- Jennifer Phipps as Alice
- Joan Gregson as Frannie

== Reception ==
The film received mixed reviews from critics, with Richard Dreyfuss' performance receiving praise. As of October 2021, 65% of the 55 reviews compiled by review aggregator Rotten Tomatoes are positive, with an average rating of 5.8/10. The website's critics consensus reads: "Astronaut can't quite escape the gravitational pull of its story's sentimental overtones, but Richard Dreyfuss keeps the film in a pleasantly diverting orbit."

Mark Kemode's film of the week in The Guardian British daily newspaper, stating "this wistful drama from Shelagh McLeod (her directorial feature debut) may not be earth-shattering, yet it retains the power to charm, thanks in large part to a central performance by Richard Dreyfuss that ranks among his best work...it’s Dreyfuss who carries the movie, pulling us over the cracks in the narrative, drawing us into his world, providing a much-needed element of magic."

Variety found the film not believable, warning viewers to "lower your expectations", and the cinematography "flat"; yet concluded that the director had "deliver[ed] in the inspiration department". The Hollywood Reporter said that McLeod's inexperience as a director resulted in the script feeling "little bald, with thinly rendered characters and a dramatic tempo that rarely gets into high gear", but ultimately finding it to be a "respectable effort overall" for a debut director.

Stephen Dalton of The Hollywood Reporter also had this to say of the film: "credit is due to (Richie) Lawrence, who breathes life into the kind of clean-cut, peachy-keen, elder-respecting grandchild archetype not seen onscreen since Hollywood discovered the surly teenager. The 71-year-old Dreyfuss gives a worthy autumnal performance, low on vanity, more actor than star. His brooding role requires him to dial down his signature live-wire energy, though McLeod indulges him with a few pleasing bursts of the old manic, fast-talking intensity. At times, Angus could almost be an older cousin of Roy Neary from Close Encounters of the Third Kind, still obsessively watching the skies, still dreaming of the stars."
