= The Left Behind (2019 film) =

British drama film

- Screenplay by: Alan Harris
- Directed by: Joseph Bullman
- Starring: Sion Daniel Young; Amy-Leigh Hickman; Aimee-Ffion Edwards; Kimberley Nixon
- Music by: Roger Goula
- Country of origin: United Kingdom
- Original language: English

Production
- Producers: Tracie Simpson; Aysha Rafaele
- Cinematography: Steve Lawes
- Editor: Mark Hermida
- Running time: 60 minutes
- Production company: BBC Studios

Original release
- Release: 10 July 2019

The Left Behind is a 2019 British television film drama, written by Alan Harris and directed by Joseph Bullman for BBC Studios. It stars Sion Daniel Young, Amy-Leigh Hickman, Aimee-Ffion Edwards and Kimberley Nixon. It was shown on BBC One on 10 July 2019. It won the BAFTA for Best Single Drama in 2020 as well as the Royal Television Society award in the same category.

== Synopsis ==
The drama was about the rise of far-right hate crime in working-class communities in post-industrial towns, in which poverty fuels anti-immigrant sentiment.

== Cast ==
- Sion Daniel Young as Gethin
- Amy-Leigh Hickman as Yasmin
- Aimee-Ffion Edwards as Annes
- Siôn Alun Davies as Carl
- Kimberley Nixon as Hannah
- Sophie Melville as Lisa
- Jalisa Andrews as Tracey
- Aled Ap Steffan as Titch
- Ryan Nolan as Massey
- Hassan Maarfi as Zac

== Production ==
=== Development ===
The production was first inspired by a 2018 statistic that referrals to the UK government's de-radicalisation programme, Prevent, had a 36% rise in the previous 12 months.

Choosing to set the drama in an unnamed town in South Wales, writer Alan Harris set to demonstrate how “perception of the far right in this country is outdated…We think of skinheads and National Front marches. But things have changed – especially in terms of the online influence” and that “we tend to either demonise this problem or ignore it.” Researching the project, the production used literature from Hope not Hate and spoke to Prevent consultants and academics, including Hilary Pilkington. Harris told The Guardian that it can be important “to write characters you don’t agree with sometimes but you do care about…to get an effective drama across, these can’t be two-dimensional, easily dismissed characters. If we dismiss it, we’re not heading towards any kind of understanding.”

=== Casting ===
Sion Daniel Young lived locally to the production and wrote a letter to director Bulman asking to be considered for the lead role and turned down a guaranteed part in a film in order to be available for the role. Aimee-Ffion Edwards said she wanted to be part of the cast after reading the script and praised the production team “who are fearless in telling stories that people would rather not engage with.”

=== Filming ===
Principal photography took place in Cardiff and other parts of south Wales.

== Accolades ==
The film won BAFTA and Royal Television Society awards for Best Single Drama, and was nominated for five BAFTA Cymru awards – Best Television Drama, Best Director: Fiction, Best Actor, Best Screenplay, Best Make Up.

== Broadcast ==
The film was shown in the UK on BBC One and was available on BBC iPlayer from 10 July 2019.
