= Time (2021 TV series) =

British TV series

- Official poster for Series 1 (2021)
- Genre: Crime drama
- Created by: Jimmy McGovern
- Written by: Jimmy McGovern; Helen Black; Samuel Bailey
- Directed by: Lewis Arnold; Andrea Harkin; Paul Whittington
- Starring: Sean Bean; Stephen Graham; Jodie Whittaker; Tamara Lawrance; Bella Ramsey; Siobhan Finneran; David Tennant
- Music by: Sarah Warne
- Country of origin: United Kingdom
- Original language: English
- No. of series: 3
- No. of episodes: 9

Production
- Executive producers: Lewis Arnold; Sean Bean; Stephen Graham; Jimmy McGovern; Michael Parke; Lucy Richer; Tom Sherry
- Producers: Simon Maloney; Mark Hedges; Amanda Black
- Cinematography: Mark Wolf
- Editor: Sacha Szwarc
- Running time: 56–67 minutes
- Production companies: BBC Studios Drama Productions; BritBox

Original release
- Network: BBC One
- Release: 6 June 2021 – 18 October 2026

Time is a British anthology crime drama television series created and principally written by Jimmy McGovern. Each series presents a new scenario following the lives of inmates and staff in His Majesty's Prison Service. The first series, starring Sean Bean and Stephen Graham, was first broadcast on BBC One on 6 June 2021 and concluded on 20 June 2021. The second series, starring Jodie Whittaker, Tamara Lawrance, Bella Ramsey and Siobhan Finneran, was first broadcast on 29 October 2023 and concluded on 12 November 2023. The third series, starring Finneran and David Tennant, premiered on 11 October 2026 and concluded on 18 October 2026.

The first series received largely positive reviews, with many praising the performances of the two leads. At the 2022 BAFTA TV Awards, the first series won Best Mini-Series and Bean won Best Actor, while Graham was nominated for Best Supporting Actor. The second series received similarly positive reviews.

== Premise ==
In the first series, Mark Cobden is newly imprisoned after killing a cyclist in an accident, consumed by guilt for his crime, and way out of his depth in the volatile world of prison life. He meets Eric McNally, an excellent prison officer doing his best to protect those in his charge. However, when one of the most dangerous inmates identifies his weakness, Eric faces an impossible choice between his principles and his family.

In the second series, Orla O'Riordan, a single mother serving her first sentence, Abi Cochrane, who is incarcerated for life, and Kelsey Morgan, a pregnant heroin addict and repeat offender, begin their sentences at a women's prison.

In the third series, Bobby Bailey, a veteran prison officer at a young offenders institution, clashes with the ideals of prison chaplain Marie-Louise O'Dell, who experiences a crisis of faith.

== Cast and characters ==
=== Series 1 ===
Main

- Sean Bean as Mark Cobden, a prisoner and former teacher
- Stephen Graham as Eric McNally, a prison officer and Mark's supervising officer

Supporting

- James Nelson-Joyce as Johnno, a prison inmate who bullies Mark
- Siobhan Finneran as Marie-Louise O'Dell, the prison chaplain
- Nabil Elouahabi as Patterson, a prison officer
- Natalie Gavin as Jardine, a prison officer
- Hannah Walters as Sonia McNally, Eric's wife
- Nadine Marshall as Alicia Cobden, Mark's wife
- Jack McMullen as Daniel, Mark's cellmate
- Sue Johnston as June Cobden, Mark's mother
- David Calder as John Cobden, Mark's father
- Bobby Schofield as Baz, an inmate who is in the same gang as Johnno
- Franc Ashman as Governor Cameron, Eric's boss and the warden of HMP Craigmore
- Jonathan Harden as Brendan Murphy, a prison inmate serving a life sentence for killing his friend
- Kadiff Kirwan as Pete, an prison inmate
- Aneurin Barnard as Bernard, a highly vulnerable, severely mentally ill prisoner with a history of extreme self-harm.
- Cal MacAninch as Galbraith, a prominent prison officer
- Brian McCardie as Jackson Jones, a prisoner
- Michael Socha as Kenny Meadows, a drug dealer
- Jason Done as PO Banks

=== Series 2 ===
Main

- Jodie Whittaker as Orla O'Riordan
- Tamara Lawrance as Abi Cochrane, an inmate incarcerated for life for infanticide after killing her newborn baby
- Bella Ramsey as Kelsey Morgan, a pregnant heroin addict arriving at Carlingford Prison
- Siobhan Finneran as Marie-Louise O'Dell, the chaplain of Carlingford Prison

Supporting

- Julie Graham as Lou Harkness, an established inmate, who is incarcerated for punching her son Stephen's pregnant wife
- Karen Henthorn as Elizabeth O'Riordan, Orla O'Riordan's mother and grandmother to Orla's three young children, Kyle, Callum, and Nancy
- Faye McKeever as Tanya Helsby, an antagonistic, dominant inmate on the wing who intimidates and bullies Abi Cochrane.
- Sophie Willan as Maeve Riley, one of the established prisoners at Carlingford Prison and Lou's best friend
- Matilda Firth as Nancy O'Riordan, Orla O'Riordan's young daughter, who is placed into care after Orla is imprisoned
- Danielle Henry as Tess Palmer, a foster carer who looks after Orla's children while Orla is in prison and arranges visits with them
- Maimuna Memon as Tahani, a fellow inmate at Carlingford Prison who plays a harmonica
- Angela Wynter as May Sinclair

=== Series 3 ===
Main

- David Tennant as Bobby Bailey, a long-standing custodial manager at HMYOI Alderwick
- Siobhan Finneran as Marie-Louise O'Dell, a new chaplain at HMYOI Alderwick

Supporting

- Louis Shelton as Patsy Flynn, a ruthless, unpredictable bully and the "chief tormentor" at HMYOI Alderwick
- Daniel Ryan as Freddie Jennings, a hard-working but institutionalised prison officer at HMYOI Alderwick and Bobby's colleague
- Chukwubuikem Molokwu as Christopher Madubuko (Ushindi), a young prison inmate who has a stammer
- Ollie McNulty as Peter Palmerston, a teenage young offender imprisoned for the stabbing of an innocent man
- Jack Barnes as Chaz
- Paul Smith Junior as Toby, a teenage young offender imprisoned for the stabbing of an innocent man and Peter's cousin
- Finn Kearns as Mark
- Louis McCartney as James Hennessy, a teenage young offender imprisoned for killing his brother
- Vinette Robinson as Erica Bailey, Bobby's wife
- Nyokabi Gethaiga as Amara Madubuko, Christopher (Ushindi)'s birth mother
- Gavin Spokes as Governor Rice, Bobby's boss
- Warren Brown as Albie, an Amazon worker and the man that Erica is having an affair with
- Jo Joyner as Nicola, Albie's wife
- Victor Zhao as Jietang, Christopher's friend and another teenage young offender imprisoned for killing a thief
- Ethaniel Davy as Jayden Spriggs, Nicola's nephew and another teenage young offender
- Eliane Umuhire as Bahati
- Jodie Price as Izzy. Peter’s girlfriend with a baby boy named. Peter jr
- Anthony Quinlan as Steve
- David Wilmot as Michael

== Episodes ==
Series	Episodes	Originally released		Average viewership (in millions)
Series	Episodes	First released	Last released	Average viewership (in millions)
1	3	6 June 2021	20 June 2021	6.09
2	3	29 October 2023	12 November 2023	3.89
3	3	11 October 2026	18 October 2026	TBA

=== Series 1 (2021) ===
No. overall	Episode	Directed by	Written by	Original release date	UK viewers (millions)
1	Episode 1	Lewis Arnold	Jimmy McGovern	6 June 2021	8.04
En route to Craigmore Prison, a former teacher, Mark Cobden, hears a raging argument between two prisoners, Johno and Baz, and a fight breaks out between the prisoners. Prison officers question and strip-search him. Mark calls his wife and gets placed in a first-night cell. Eric McNally is a prison officer at Craigmore Prison. On the first day, Eric does the induction. Mark meets his cellmate, Bernard, a schizophrenic prisoner. Mark tells Bernard he is doing four years for killing someone by dangerous driving. Bernard says he is doing 10 years for his father's manslaughter. At night, Mark sees Bernard's self-inflicted wounds and presses the emergency button. Eric brings armed guards to take him to segregation. Irwine tells Eric that his son, David, is in Lowood Prison and indirectly threatens Eric to give him "protection", making Eric anxious. In prison, Johno bullies Mark. Eric meets David and plans to transfer him to another prison. In the morning, Johno throws scalding sugary water on Baz. The prison governor tells Mark that they will move him to Chapel Grove. Mark witnesses Bernard's suicide, and the chaplain informs that he overdosed on his medication. Armed men arrest Irwine. Johno punches Mark, giving him a bloodied nose. Irwine tells Eric that David is in Chapel Grove, where he fights Irwine.
2	Episode 2	Lewis Arnold	Jimmy McGovern	13 June 2021	5.18
Mark expresses his desire to write a letter to the wife of the man he killed. He meets his new cellmate, Daniel, who is serving a 21-year sentence for murder. The governor informs Eric that his son has been attacked and is critically injured, leading Eric to promise his wife he will go along to keep their son safe. Mark hands his letter to Eric, who later meets Mrs. Hughes, Bernard's mother, and apologises, but she angrily destroys his blinker. Mark assists a fellow inmate, Kavanagh, in writing an anniversary message to his wife. Eric gets involved with drug dealing, receiving drugs from Kenny to smuggle. Mark's wife, Alicia, asks for a divorce and tells him she met someone. Mark convinces Daniel to meet the parents of the man he killed. On day 88, they meet Gerald Wilson's parents, who ask Daniel why it happened. Eric tells Mark that the letter has been rejected. Daniel saves Mark when Johno threatens to set his feet on fire. Mark meets Jackson to toughen him up. Eventually, Mark fights Johno and bites his ear. Kenny gives Eric another parcel and explains that his son is in jail. A police officer pulls him over for the smashed rear light.
3	Episode 3	Lewis Arnold	Jimmy McGovern	20 June 2021	5.06
Brendan reveals his dark past of murdering his best friend at 13. Mark teaches Kavanagh and informs Daniel to dispose of a phone he found. Eric meets David and tells him that his father has been supplying drugs for months. Mark requests the chaplain to contact his mother, who then informs him of John's death. As Mark leaves prison for the funeral, police find the phone during a cell search. Mark returns to his cell, and Daniel moves out. On day 509, Mark watches the New Year fireworks. Brendan reveals to his victim's brother that he confessed his love to him. The governor and chaplain invite Mark to a conference. Jackson offers Mark a smuggling job. At the conference, he shares his drinking problem and a previous accident that led to a death, ultimately resulting in a court confrontation with the victim's wife. Jackson and Flanagan beat Mark, but Kavanagh saves him. The governor meets Eric to search him. They find the drugs, and the police arrest Eric, and he tells his wife. After 730 days, Mark gets released. He hugs Kavanagh, says goodbye to Daniel, and meets Eric. The judge sentences Eric to four years in prison. After a year, Mark has an emotional meeting with the victim's wife.

=== Series 2 (2023) ===
No. overall	Episode	Directed by	Written by	Original release date	UK viewers (millions)
4	Episode 1	Andrea Harkin	Jimmy McGovern & Helen Black	29 October 2023	4.14
Single mother Orla, heroin addict Kelsey, and lifer Abi are sent to prison. While Orla loses control of her old life, Kelsey makes a personal discovery and Abi attempts to hide a terrible secret.
5	Episode 2	Andrea Harkin	Jimmy McGovern & Helen Black	5 November 2023	3.71
Several months after she is released, Orla is sent back to prison and her children remain in care. While Abi confides in Marie-Louise about her past, Kelsey thinks about the future of her unborn child.
6	Episode 3	Andrea Harkin	Jimmy McGovern & Helen Black	12 November 2023	3.78
Orla faces consequences while trying to reconnect with her children, Abi attempts to overcome her unresolved grief, and Kelsey hopes to move on from her old life and plan a future with her child.

=== Series 3 (2026) ===
No. overall	Episode	Directed by	Written by	Original release date	UK viewers (millions)
7	Episode 1	Paul Whittington	Jimmy McGovern & Samuel Bailey	11 October 2026	N/A
Marie-Louise, the new chaplain at HMYOI Alderwick, a young offenders institution, and is overseen by CO Bobby Bailey as she navigates her role amidst the complexities of inmate life. On her first day, she meets inmates James Hennessy and Peter Palmerston, along with Palmerston's companions. Christopher Madubuko, a stammerer, struggles with communication barriers and gets stressed during a visit with his birth mother, Amara, who speaks Swahili. Meanwhile, Bailey experiences personal turmoil as his wife reveals her affair with another man, Albie, leading to relationship tensions. Bobby, Albie, Albie's wife, Nicola, and Bobby's wife meet at a restaurant where they contemplate selling their homes to buy a home of their own. Marie-Louise informs Peter of his attack victim's death. James grapples with his family's issues, especially the news of his father's terminal condition, and later attacks Jennings who previously punched him. After Louise opens a gate, Peter and his friends attack Patsy Flynn, a key figure in the prison hierarchy. Christopher, now using his birth name Ushindi, seeking resolution and a chance to hug with his mother, faces further turmoil during a reconciliation meeting with Jennings when Flynn fatally stabs Ushindi in the neck with a shiv, killing him.
8	Episode 2	Paul Whittington	Jimmy McGovern & Samuel Bailey	12 October 2026	N/A
The prison faces the fallout of Ushindi's death inside its care. Marie-Louise and Governor Rice notify Amara, whose translator, Bahati, confronts Rice over the use of knives. As an official inquiry begins, Bailey is questioned and defends Jennings, despite having previously warned him off the meeting due to Flynn's violent past. Jayden, Ushindi's friend and Nicola's nephew, is assaulted by Peter's friends for not standing up to Flynn. Meanwhile, Marie-Louise tries teaching Peter to read but upsets him by bringing up Jayden's assault, prompting Peter to ask James to teach him instead. At a memorial organized by Marie-Louise, Jayden and Jietang speak; Jietang reveals he killed someone who stole from his father's shop. A separate fight erupts between Jietang and Flynn's friend. Peter receives a visit from his girlfriend, his baby son, and her threatening father. Outside the walls, Bailey finds his home put up for sale without permission and removes the sign despite Erica's lawsuit threats, while Bobby dates Nicola. Later, Jayden relapses into self-harm and is gravely injured in his cell. Upon learning Jennings spent his compassionate leave playing golf, Bobby threatens to report his prior warning to the governor, leading Jennings to punch him.
9	Episode 3	Paul Whittington	Jimmy McGovern & Samuel Bailey	18 October 2026	N/A
Bobby and Nicola meet at a restaurant where a former inmate confronts them regarding Jennings's violent behaviour. Bobby reports Jennings to the governor, who offers him a bribe of a deputy governor position instead. Bobby later proposes eliminating the keep-apart system, but is ignored. Peter faces scrutiny over his blood-stained clothing from a previous incident and grapples with his involvement in a stabbing. Jayden, self-harming out of guilt for Ushindi's death, contemplates confessing to Amara but Bobby dissuades him. Peter writes a story for his son, confesses to Marie-Louise that his cousin Toby was the attacker in the crime, but hesitates to inform the police due to threats from Toby's mother (his aunt). Amara testifies at Flynn's trial, while James learns of his father's death and avoids meeting his mother. After a violent assault by Toby's friends, Peter ultimately testifies against Toby in court, leading to his release. Later, Jayden eventually confesses to Amara, who embraces him. Bobby gives crucial evidence at Ushindi's inquest, implicating Jennings and revealing the governor's corruption. James briefly attends his father's funeral, and is transferred to an adult prison. Marie-Louise reconnects with a former priest, leaving to run an asylum seeker initiative in Toxteth.

== Production ==
Most of the filming of the first series took place in the Liverpool City Region, with the prison wings and cells filmed at HM Prison Shrewsbury, a former prison which was decommissioned in 2013. The cameras moved to Liverpool to create the rest of the prison using courtrooms, police stations and educational buildings, as well as exterior locations such as the Silver Jubilee Bridge in Widnes and Southport Pier.

== Reception ==
Writing in The Guardian, Lucy Mangan wrote: "The performances of Bean and Graham are, even though we have come to expect brilliance from them both, astonishing. So, too, are those from everyone in smaller roles, none of which is underwritten or sketchy, and who thicken the drama into something more profoundly moving and enraging at every turn". Billie Schwab Dunn, writing for Metro, praised the show, which was "elevated by the central performances – particularly Bean, who gently grounds us and provides a beam of light in all that darkness".

Camilla Long of The Times says Bella Ramsey's performance was "transfixing, screaming and huffing through the first episode like a scab-infested skunk, going from spitting rage to wide-eyed giggles in a glimmer."

For series one, review aggregator website Rotten Tomatoes reported a 100% approval rating based on 23 critic reviews. The website's critics consensus reads, "Time's heavy load can be challenging, but strong writing and a magnificent performance from Sean Bean make for an incredible, thought-provoking watch." For series two, Rotten Tomatoes reported a 93% approval rating based on 15 critic reviews. The website's critics consensus reads, "Time's second season can be grinding and grueling, but its exemplary ensemble ensures that it is never less than riveting." On Metacritic, series one scored 82 out of 100, based on 7 critics, indicating "universal acclaim", and series two scored 80 out of 100, based on 9 critics, indicating "generally favorable".

== Awards and nominations ==
Year	Award	Category	Nominee	Result	Ref.
2022	BAFTA TV Awards	Best Mini-Series	Time	Won	
2022	BAFTA TV Awards	Best Actor	Sean Bean	Won	
2022	BAFTA TV Awards	Best Supporting Actor	Stephen Graham	Nominated	
2022	BAFTA TV Craft Awards	Director:Fiction	Lewis Arnold	Nominated	
2022	BAFTA TV Craft Awards	Photography & Lighting:Fiction	Mark Wolf	Nominated	
2022	BAFTA TV Craft Awards	Scripted Casting	Beverley Keogh, David Marin	Nominated	
2024	BAFTA TV Craft Awards	Editing:Fiction	Alex Mackie	Nominated	
2024	BAFTA TV Craft Awards	Scripted Casting	Amy Hubbard	Nominated	
2024	RTS Awards	Leading Actor:Female	Tamara Lawrance	Won	
2024	RTS Awards	Leading Actor:Female	Jodie Whittaker	Nominated	
2024	RTS Awards	Supporting Actor:Female	Bella Ramsey	Won	
