= Aimee-Ffion Edwards =

Welsh actress (born 1987)

- Born: 21 November 1987 (age 38); Newport, Wales
- Occupation: Actress
- Years active: 2002–present

Aimee-Ffion Edwards (born 21 November 1987) is a Welsh actress. Her television roles include Esme Shelby in Peaky Blinders (2013–2022) and Shirley Dander in Slow Horses (2022–present), and her video game voice roles include Rachel Baker in Everybody's Gone to the Rapture, Mio in Xenoblade Chronicles 3, and Ranni the Witch in Elden Ring.

== Early life and education ==
Aimee-Ffion Edwards was born in Newport, on 21 November 1987.. She studied A-level drama and later joined the National Youth Theatre of Wales.

== Career ==
=== Film and television ===
Edwards appeared in the 2002 short film Dŵr Dwfn. She was training to be a classical singer when she appeared on the Pop Idol-type Welsh language TV show Wawffactor in 2006, finishing as runner-up. She made her television debut as the character Sketch in the E4 series Skins in 2008. In 2009, she appeared in the Casualty episode "Stand By Me" as a teenager who finds a replacement speed date in the wards of Holby City Hospital, and ends up involved in a serious gun-related incident. In the first episode of Casualty 1909, she played a young prostitute who was being abused by her father.

In 2010, Edwards appeared in an episode of the supernatural BBC drama series Being Human as a theatre usher who is also a ghost. In 2011, she appeared in series 2 of the BBC drama series Luther as Jenny Jones. In 2012, she appeared in Sky Atlantic's four-part series Walking And Talking, a spin-off from an episode of Sky One's Christmas series of shorts Little Crackers. From 2013 to 2021, she appeared as Esme Shelby in the BBC series Peaky Blinders. In 2014, she appeared in two BBC Cymru Wales television productions celebrating the centenary of Dylan Thomas: as part of an all-Welsh cast in a television adaptation of Thomas' radio drama Under Milk Wood, playing the Laugharne Voice, and as Marianne in A Poet in New York, Andrew Davies' dramatisation of Thomas' last days.

In 2014, Edwards appeared as Katy in the Inside No. 9 episode "The Harrowing". From 2014 to 2015, she played Sophie in the BBC Four comedy series Detectorists. In 2016, she appeared in Death in Paradise as Sian. In 2017, she appeared in the Channel 4 comedy series Loaded. In 2019, she played Miss Aitken in BBC Three's comedy series Man Like Mobeen. In 2022, she joined the cast of Slow Horses during its second season as Shirley Dander.

Edwards will voice the character Princess Leia in Star Wars: Episode IV - A New Hope, which is to be dubbed into Welsh for the first time as the film prepares to celebrate its 50th anniversary in 2027.

=== Stage ===
Edwards made her stage debut in 2008 in SH*T-M*X at the Trafalgar Theatre in London. In 2009, she performed in Jerusalem at the Royal Court Theatre. In 2011, she made her Broadway debut when she reprised her role in Jerusalem at New York's Music Box Theatre. She appeared in the London revival of Jerusalem later that year. In 2012, she appeared in The Recruiting Officer at the Donmar Warehouse, and in Marius von Mayenburg's Fireface at the Young Vic. In 2013, she appeared as Avonia Bunn in Trelawny of the Wells at the Donmar Warehouse. In 2017, she played Marcella in B, a play by Guillermo Calderón which had a limited run at the Royal Court Theatre.

=== Video games ===
In 2015, Edwards voiced Rachel Baker in the video game Everybody's Gone to the Rapture. In 2022, she voiced Ranni the Witch, a major non-playable character in Elden Ring and Mio in the English dub of Xenoblade Chronicles 3.

== Filmography ==
=== Film ===
Year	Title	Role	Notes
2002	Dŵr Dwfn		Short film
2007	Olas de verano	Madlen Vaughan	Short film
2012	Epithet	Rebecca	Short film
2012	One Day Some Years Ago	Lisa	Short film
2014	A Poet in New York	Marianne	Television film
2014	Under Milk Wood	Laugharne Voice	Television film
2014	Steak Knife	Julia	Short film
2014	Queen and Country	Sophie Adams	
2015	Bugsplat!	Shona Berry	Television film
2016	Zero Sum	Ruth Sharman	Short film
2018	To Provide All People	Patient	Television film
2019	The Left Behind	Annes	Television film
2020	Blithe Spirit	Edith	
2022	Life and Death in the Warehouse	Megan	Television film
2025	Mr Burton	Cis	
2026	Star Wars: Gobaith Newydd	Princess Leia	Welsh dub of Star Wars: Episode IV – A New Hope

=== Television ===
Year	Title	Role	Notes
2008	Skins	Sketch	7 episodes
2009	Casualty	Nina	Episode: "Stand by Me"
2009	Casualty 1909	Deborah Lynch	1 episode
2010	Being Human	Robin	Episode: "In the Morning"
2010	Law & Order: UK	Kim Baker	Episode: "Hounded"
2010	Little Crackers	Mary	Episode: "Better Than Christmas"
2011	Luther	Jenny Jones	4 episodes
2012	Walking and Talking	Mary	4 episodes
2013–2022	Peaky Blinders	Esme Shelby	15 episodes
2014	Inside No. 9	Katy	Episode: "The Harrowing"
2014–2015	Detectorists	Sophie	12 episodes
2015	Wolf Hall	Elizabeth Barton	2 episodes
2016	Death in Paradise	Sian Evans	Episode: "Flames of Love"
2017	Loaded	Abi	8 episodes
2017	Summer Comedy Shorts	Leila	Episode: "Morgana Robinson's Summer"
2017	Comedy Playhouse	Jemma Smith	Episode: "Mister Winner"
2018	Troy: Fall of a City	Cassandra	7 episodes
2018–2020	Thunderbirds Are Go	Havoc (voice)	13 episodes
2018–2020	101 Dalmatian Street	Arabella, Big Fee, Summer (voice)	11 episodes
2019	Curfew	Ruby Newman	8 episodes
2019	Keeping Faith	Madlen Vaughan	6 episodes
2019	The Reluctant Landlord	Charlotte	Episode: "Love & Marriage"
2019	Four Weddings and a Funeral	Tabby	5 episodes
2019	Man Like Mobeen	Miss Aitken	2 episodes
2021	War of the Worlds	Isla	8 episodes
2022–present	Slow Horses	Shirley Dander	Main cast
2023	Dreamland	Leila	Main cast
2025	The Revenge Club	Emily	Main cast
2026	Believe Me	Sarah	Main cast
2026	Dragon Striker	Skadi Savarog	

=== Video games ===
Year	Title	Voice role	Notes
2015	Everybody's Gone to the Rapture	Rachel Baker	
2020-2022	Assassin's Creed Valhalla	Angharad ferch Meurig, Brigid, Tyra	
2022	Elden Ring	Ranni the Witch	
2022	Xenoblade Chronicles 3	Mio	
