= The Secret History of Our Streets =

- Genre: Documentary
- Directed by: Joseph Bullman (series 1); Russell England (series 2)
- Narrated by: Steven Mackintosh
- Theme music composer: Matthew Cracknell
- Country of origin: United Kingdom
- Original language: English
- No. of seasons: 2
- No. of episodes: 9

Production
- Executive producers: Simon Ford (series 1&2); Katie Bailiff (series 2)
- Producers: Katie Bailiff & Joseph Bullman (series 1); Russell England (series 2)
- Cinematography: Mark Wolf (series 1); Alistair McCormick (series 2)
- Editors: Michael Harrowes (series 1); Simon Greenwood (series 2)
- Production companies: The Open University; Century Films; Halcyons Heart Films

Original release
- Network: BBC Two
- Release: 6 June 2012 – 5 August 2014

Related
- A House Through Time

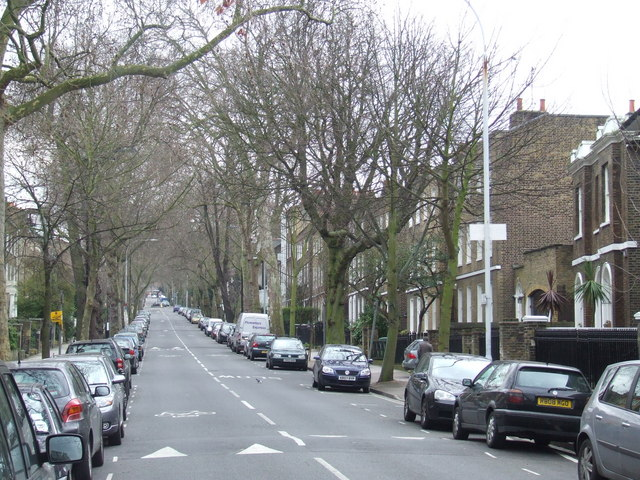
Camberwell Grove, one of the streets featured in the series.

The Secret History of Our Streets is a BBC documentary series that examined the social history of streets. It was a co-production between the BBC and The Open University.

The first series showed how London has changed since Charles Booth's survey of social conditions began in 1886, while the second series focused on three streets in Scotland.

== Episode list ==
=== Series one ===
- Arnold Circus, Bethnal Green
- Caledonian Road, Islington
- Camberwell Grove, Southwark
- Deptford High Street, south east London
- Portland Road, Notting Hill
- Reverdy Road, Bermondsey

=== Series two ===
A second series examined the history of three streets and estates in Scotland:

- The Fittie Squares, Aberdeen
- Duke Street, Glasgow
- The Moray Estate, Edinburgh

== See also ==
- A House Through Time
