= Rain on the Roof =

- Written by: Dennis Potter
- Directed by: Alan Bridges
- Starring: Cheryl Campbell; Malcolm Stoddard; Ewan Stewart
- Composer: George Fenton
- Country of origin: United Kingdom

Production
- Producers: Kenith Trodd; Tony Wharmby
- Running time: 82 minutes

Original release
- Network: ITV
- Release: 26 October 1980

Related
- Blade on the Feather (1980); Cream in My Coffee (1980)

Rain on the Roof is a television drama by Dennis Potter, broadcast by ITV on 26 October 1980.

It is the second in a loosely connected trilogy of plays exploring language and betrayal, produced for London Weekend Television by the independent company Potter and producer Kenith Trodd established after a break in the playwright's relationship with the BBC. A psycho-sexual thriller, the drama is an example of the visitation motif: a key theme in Potter's work. The title of the play is taken from the 1932 Al Bowlly song of the same name.

== Synopsis ==
Janet and John are a frustrated middle class couple; John is an advertising copywriter while Janet is a bored housewife with a (well founded) suspicion that her husband is having an affair with his business partner's wife, Emma, after observing them together at their disastrous New Year's Eve party.

The following morning, after her husband has gone to work, she is visited by Billy, an illiterate local youth to whom she once gave reading and writing lessons. Billy's abusive father has recently died, and contact with a Jehovah's Witness has led him to seek solace in religion. Billy hopes that by resuming his lessons he may one day read the Bible. Janet, eager to redress the balance in her broken marriage, makes a move on Billy after he has an adverse reaction to the anti-depressants he has been taking. When John returns home he discovers a naked Billy in the living room, lying under a blanket with a half-dressed Janet. John slaps her.

That night, Janet and John have John's business partner Martin and his wife Emma round for dinner: Janet insists Billy join them. As John and Emma's affair is revealed to an unsurprised Martin, and Janet argues with her husband, who throws curry in her lap, Billy flees to the greenhouse at the bottom of the garden where, unknown to the couple, he has been living for the last few days since walking out on his bereaved mother. After Martin and Emma leave, Janet and John continue to argue. Janet takes a bath while her husband drowns his miseries with a bottle of wine. Meanwhile, Billy takes a shard of glass that fell from the greenhouse roof that morning, returns to the house and knocks on the door; when John answers, Billy stabs him through the throat. Janet rushes downstairs and is confronted by Billy, consumed by rage and jealousy, who declares her "wicked" and her husband "no better than an animal". In an attempt to pacify him, a fearful Janet sits Billy down in the study to resume their lessons. As Janet tries to rein in her sobs, Billy notes "They be funny things, words".

=== Principal cast ===
- Cheryl Campbell as Janet
- Malcolm Stoddard as John
- Ewan Stewart as Billy
- Michael Culver as Martin
- Madeline Hinde as Emma

== Production ==
Rain on the Roof was the second play in a proposed series of nine dramas produced by Potter and Kenith Trodd's own production company Pennies From Heaven Ltd. to be broadcast on ITV between 1980 and 1981. Commissioned by Michael Grade and distributed through London Weekend Television, six of the plays would be written by Potter while the remaining three were to be shared between Jim Allen and an undisclosed writer. In the event, budget cuts and scheduling problems led to only three plays being produced: Blade on the Feather, Rain on the Roof and Cream in My Coffee. All three dramas were shot on 16mm film stock and featured extensive location work.

== Sources ==
- Humphrey Carpenter, Dennis Potter: A Biography; 1998
- Graham Fuller (Ed.), Potter on Potter; 1993
- W. Stephen Gilbert, Fight & Kick & Bite: The Life and Work of Dennis Potter; 1995
