= Joan (TV series) =

2024 British television miniseries

- Genre: Crime drama
- Created by: Anna Symon
- Based on: I Am What I Am: The True Story of Britain’s Most Notorious Jewel Thief by Joan Hannington
- Written by: Anna Symon; Helen Black
- Directed by: Richard Laxton
- Starring: Sophie Turner; Frank Dillane
- Composer: Harry Escott
- Country of origin: United Kingdom
- Original language: English
- No. of series: 1
- No. of episodes: 6

Production
- Executive producers: Ruth Kenley-Letts; Jenny Van Der Lande; Neil Blair; Richard Laxton
- Producer: Paul Frift
- Production companies: All3Media International; Snowed-In Productions

Original release
- Network: ITV1; ITVX
- Release: 29 September – 14 October 2024

Joan is a British crime drama television miniseries created by Anna Symon for ITV. Sophie Turner plays professional jewel thief Joan Hannington, a real-life figure known as "the Godmother" by certain aspects of the British criminal underworld. Paul Frift serves as producer and the series is directed by Richard Laxton.

== Synopsis ==
The series features Hannington's journey from housewife and mother to petty offender, diamond thief and criminal mastermind in 1980s London.

== Cast ==
- Sophie Turner as Joan Hannington (née O'Connell), a struggling single mother with an eidetic memory and a talent for accents and mimicry. To provide for her daughter, she turns to professional thievery.
- Frank Dillane as Boise Hannington, Joan's mentor/lover
- Mia Millichamp-Long as Kelly, Joan's young daughter
- Kirsty J. Curtis as Nancy, Joan's sister who runs a popular hair salon in London
- Gershwyn Eustache Jr. as Albie, Bosie's fence and former cellmate, who lives overseas
- Tomi May as King, a pawnbroker who moonlights as a forger, specializing in expensive jewels
- Laura Aikman as Val, Albie's girlfriend and mother of his son, Johnny
- Alex Blake as Bernard, a predatory jeweler who becomes Joan's first victim
- Jack Greenlees as Tom Fordwick, a police detective sympathetic to Joan

== Production ==
The six-part series was announced in November 2022 with Sophie Turner cast as Joan Hannington. It was created by Anna Symon, adapting from Hannington's 2002 memoir I Am What I Am: The True Story of Britain's Most Notorious Jewel Thief, with the pair meeting as Symon was writing the series. The project comes from Snowed-In Productions and is co-produced in association with All3Media International – who handled distribution of the show outside the United Kingdom – and the CW – which aired it in the United States. The series was picked up to air in Canada by CBC Gem, where it released all six episodes on 11 October 2024.

=== Casting ===
Frank Dillane was revealed to be joining the cast in May 2023. In an early scene in which Dillane's character first meets Joan, the bartender is played by Joan Hannington's real life son Benny.

=== Filming ===
Filming for the series began in May 2023 in Herne Bay, Kent. Filming also took place that month in Walsall and Birmingham, England. Filming also took place in August 2023 in Leamington Spa, Warwickshire, and in September 2023 in Malvern, Worcestershire, with other filming locations in the Jewellery Quarter and Chillington Hall, Wolverhampton.

== Broadcast ==
The series premiered in the United Kingdom on ITV1 and on its streaming service ITVX, on 29 September 2024. In Scotland it was broadcast on STV and made available on STV Player. It premiered in the United States on The CW on 2 October 2024, as a part of its 2024–25 television season. In Bulgaria, it premiered on 28 October 2024 on Epic Drama.

== Episodes ==
No.	Title	Directed by	Written by	Original release date	U.K. viewers (millions)
1	"1.1"	Richard Laxton	Anna Symon	29 September 2024	4.14
In 1985, Joan O'Connell is a barmaid and girlfriend of small-time gangster Gary, with whom she shares a daughter, Kelly. Gary is abusive, cheats on Joan with a mistress, and racks up a large debt to the local mob, who threaten Joan at gunpoint. Fearing for her life, she throws him out and puts Kelly up for foster care before fleeing to London, where her sister Nancy gives her a makeover and a job as a hairstylist. Joan is refused a day off to visit Kelly; she steals a car and winds up in jail. A police officer, Tom, helps her avoid a tough sentence, but Nancy is forced to fire her when Gary breaks into the salon with a knife. Looking for another job, Joan teaches herself the basics of the jeweler's trade and gets a job working for an older man named Bernard. When he sexually harasses her, Joan quits, but not before pinching several diamonds from the store safe and swallowing them. At a bar, she meets antiques dealer Boise Hannington. Intrigued by the diamonds, he asks Joan if she's willing to steal again.
2	"1.2"	Richard Laxton	Anna Symon	30 September 2024	3.80
Boise teaches Joan how to pass bad checks and sends her to shoplift several expensive outfits; Joan is successful but tells Boise that she's never stealing again. To fence a load of jewels, the pair travel to Spain on forged passports posing as a married couple, with Joan learning how to alter her appearance with wigs and makeup. In Spain, Bosie introduces her to his fence, Albie, and Albie's girlfriend Val. As they spend more time together, Bosie asks Joan to move in with him; she refuses and tells him that she never wants to be under a man's thumb again. Albie confronts Joan and reveals that he knows about her past. He mocks her as a poor mother, and she storms out. On the flight home, Boise admits to Joan that he's been training her to become a professional thief. Filled with anger and mistrust, Joan leaves him and tries to regain custody of Kelly but is denied due to her criminal history and lack of stable income. In despair, she turns to Boise and agrees to be properly trained as a thief.
3	"1.3"	Richard Laxton	Anna Symon	6 October 2024	3.99
Joan assists Boise in burglarizing a rich widow; her male companion catches them in the act, and Boise is forced to assault him in order to escape. Frustrated by his actions, Joan demands to know why Boise won't treat her as an equal in their partnership. When he refuses to answer, she retrieves her diamonds and tries to sell them to a man named King, but he chases her out. Albie unexpectedly visits London to work with Boise, and Joan is inspired to concoct a new scheme: assuming the identity of a rich American socialite, she visits a high-end jeweler and steals his most valuable ring with Albie and Bosie posing as jealous romantic rivals to create a distraction. King buys the ring for a large sum, and Boise asks Joan to marry him, which she accepts. A social worker comes by to tell Joan that Kelly's foster parents wish to formally adopt her; as Joan is still not considered responsible enough, she urges her to agree. Joan secretly breaks into Kelly's home and watches as her foster mother kisses her to sleep.
4	"1.4"	Richard Laxton	Helen Black	7 October 2024	3.80
5	"1.5"	Richard Laxton	Anna Symon	13 October 2024	4.30
6	"1.6"	Richard Laxton	Anna Symon	14 October 2024	4.18

== Reception ==
On the review aggregator website Rotten Tomatoes, the series holds an approval rating of 81% based on 21 critic reviews, with an average rating of 7.4/10. The website's critic consensus states, "Sophie Turner shines like a diamond in Joan, a stylish crime drama that pays dividends with its 1980s period detail and feminist edge." Metacritic, which uses a weighted average, assigned a score of 66 out of 100 based on 12 critics, indicating "generally favourable" reviews.
