= King Cotton (play) =

Musical written by Jimmy McGovern

King Cotton was a specially commissioned musical written by Jimmy McGovern and directed by Jude Kelly, based on an idea by Ian Brownbill and designed by Ti Green.

The piece was co-commissioned by The Lowry and the Liverpool Culture Company to mark "Liverpool 08" and the bicentenary of the Abolition of the Slave Trade Act. The project was supported by Arts Council England, the PRS Foundation and the Liverpool Empire Theatre.

The production is set in the Lancashire Cotton Famine and links with the American Civil War. King Cotton is the epic story of Tom, an impoverished mill-worker from the north-west of England, and Sokoto, a black slave from an American cotton plantation. Both are searching for their own freedom, but neither imagines that this journey will bring them together with such devastating consequences. The play is set to a moving live score of brass band music, provided by Ashton Under Lyne Brass Band and traditional spiritual music.

The play starred John Henshaw, Israel Oyelumade, Paul Anderson and Cornelius Macarthy opened at The Lowry, Salford, United Kingdom, on 12 September 2007, before moving to the Liverpool Empire Theatre from 25 September 2007.
