= Liverpool dockers' dispute (1995–1998) =

Dispute between dockers and their employers

Liverpool dockers' strike
- Date: September 1995 – 26 January 1998 (850 days or 121 weeks)
- Location: Liverpool
- Goals: Reinstatement
- Methods: Strike action, International co-operation: Demonstrations; Walkout
- Status: Settled
- Result: Payout

Parties
Liverpool Dockers	Mersey Docks and Harbour Company	Transport and General Workers' Union

Lead figures
Jimmy Nolan; Jimmy Davies	Trevor Furlong	Bill Morris

The Liverpool Dockers' dispute between dockers and their employers, Mersey Docks and Harbour Company (MDHC) and Torside Ltd, in Liverpool, England, lasted from 1995 to 1998. Although considered a strike, it was strictly a lockout as the employers, Mersey Docks, sacked the dockers for breach of contract when they refused to cross a picket line set up by their sacked Torside Limited colleagues. Initially, five Torside workers were dismissed following a dispute regarding overtime pay, who in turn formed a picket line that other dockers refused to cross in solidarity.

Various celebrities and high-profile figures, including footballer Robbie Fowler and singer Noel Gallagher, expressed and showed their support during the dispute, either through public awareness or financial support. Despite the election success of a Labour government in 1997, this did not help towards ending the dispute, given the new administration failed to reverse anti-trade union legislation enacted by the former Conservative administration.

The media's reaction to the dispute was unenthusiastic – the BBC's political correspondent for Liverpool suggested that editors did not find the story appealing while other organisations portrayed the dockers as dinosaurs. The British tabloid press did not start to cover the dispute until the international press became aware via communication over the Internet, which had been used by dockers to engage with worldwide trade unions.

The dockers had previously been described by Lloyd's List as "the most productive workforce in Europe". The dispute was never officially recognised by their union due to a ballot not being undertaken before the walkout, although the union did offer support financially and helped towards settlement negotiations. Various settlement offers were made by Mersey Docks and subsequently rejected by the dockers during the course of the dispute. By the time a settlement was negotiated and accepted in 1998, the conflict had become one of the longest disputes in labour history.

== Background ==
At the heart of the dispute was a belief that Mersey Docks were seeking to reintroduce a casual workforce. The National Dock Labour Scheme had been established in 1947, responsible for defining workers' rights, payment and training within a national dockers register; a National Dock Labour Board was also set up, comprising representatives from the unions and employers in equal measure, although in doing so afforded unions significant control over recruitment. The scheme, which had protected employment terms and conditions as well as wages and benefits, was abolished in 1989, a decision which was opposed by unions who called a national dock strike against the abolition, yet was defeated and followed with many dock unions becoming derecognised. Liverpool was the last port to cease strike action against the dispute. Prior to the scheme's dissolution, dockers had described going to work as "a real pleasure" in a "more relaxed atmosphere", although hard work was still expected and earnings had to be fought for. Following the scheme's abolishment, Mersey Docks assured dockers that casual labour would not return to the docklands and continued, albeit alone amongst ports across Britain, to recognise the dockers' union.

An aggressive stance was adopted by Mersey Docks towards its relations with the dockers, with regulations being introduced towards the end of the 1980s requiring dockers to be available for work at all times, including days off. Dockworkers saw their living standards and income gradually eroded in order to ensure that trade union relations with dock companies remained cost-effective. From 1983 to 1989, docker numbers nationally fell to 9,400 from 14,631, while the tonnage workload that each docker handled increased three-fold.

As dockers retired, their jobs were typically replaced by sub-contracted workers under different working conditions, typically with Torside Limited. Between 1989 and 1992, around 80% of dockers left the industry, while the number of employees between 1989 and 1995 fell by over half, from 1,100 to 500. Although docker numbers decreased, the volumes handled by the port were increasing, from around 20 million tonnes in 1988 to over 30 million tonnes in 1997. The number of Liverpool dockers employed during the 1960s was 12,000, yet this had dropped to 6,000 by 1980. Workers wanting to enter the dock trade, often the sons of established dockers, had to do so via sub-contracted firms due to the lack of jobs available. The conditions of these jobs would ultimately create the conditions that resulted in the dispute.

In 1993, Mersey Docks worked towards imposing harsher employment contracts, including more working hours that required dockers to be available "at any time", knowing it would be rejected by the dockers and their union alike. To ensure dockers accepted the revised contracts, Mersey Docks advertised new jobs locally, receiving thousands of applications and interviewing many, yet no single individual was employed on a permanent basis. In a state of confusion and apprehension, dockers accepted the new contracts, despite initially rejecting them outright. From this period through to the start of the dispute, individual dock workers were harassed and intimidated for various reasons and by 1995, 170 faced disciplinary proceedings. Many of the dockers felt their lives were restricted by the unstructured working hours, which may have involved little-to-no notice requirement to work during the night. Surveys of the time showed that the new procedures were taking their toll on the workforce and affecting morale, while over 85% were concerned about the longer working hours. Of those surveyed, over half felt that standards of health and safety were severely compromised, as rates of accidents increased.

== Events ==
=== Dispute origins ===
On 25 September 1995, sub-contractor Torside Limited were in dispute with its workers regarding overtime pay, resulting in five employees being dismissed. The sacked dockers formed a picket line which fellow Torside dockers refused to cross, ultimately resulting in the company dismissing all 80 of its workforce. Dockers directly employed by Mersey Docks similarly refused to cross the picket line in support of their fellow dockers. After three days, Mersey Docks declared that the dockers had dismissed themselves by not crossing the picket line, resulting in 300 of the 380 strong work force being dismissed for breach of contract. Labour laws passed by Margaret Thatcher's Conservative government of the 1980s and 1990s, such as the Employment Act 1980, made it illegal to take part in secondary action, except in limited circumstances. The Employment Act 1990 made the limited circumstances also unlawful and unions could be taken to court if they organised secondary actions. While picketing, dockers were surrounded by police and private security guards, yet stood firm, buoyed by support from celebrities such as musicians and footballers, defying Mersey Docks' strategy of waiting until the pickets diminished.

Within the first few weeks of the dispute, local parliamentary representatives met with Mersey Docks to consider a progressive solution and attempted to instill the importance of what it meant to dockers and their families alike. Robert Parry, Member of Parliament for Liverpool Riverside, was inundated with letters from dockers and their families who were astonished and bewildered at the thought of being unemployed. In October 1995, Member of Parliament for Liverpool Garston Eddie Loyden gave a speech in the House of Commons, in which he said:

It is 1995, and we are returning to the dark days of threatened casualisation. I believe that that is a serious threat. I believe that people are entitled to work with dignity under conditions that are human, and to be part of the process of developing the industry in the way that they have.
At one time, the dockers were the butt of the jokes of some poor comedians, but they themselves have a sense of humour that no one can match and they are men, in that sense, who are proud to be dockers. They are proud of the work they do and proud of the port in which they work, and so are their families and friends and their communities.

Some dockers were offered new contracts, subject to alteration by the Mersey Docks. As a ballot had not been held, the union declared the strike action to be unofficial, meaning the strikers were in breach of contract with Mersey Docks. Mersey Docks terminated contracts and advertised for replacement labour within 24 hours, at lower rates of pay and under different conditions. An offer was made by Mersey Docks the following month for £10,000 per docker, which was rejected. Lloyd's List had previously described the dockers as "the most productive workforce in Europe".

=== Support and public campaign ===
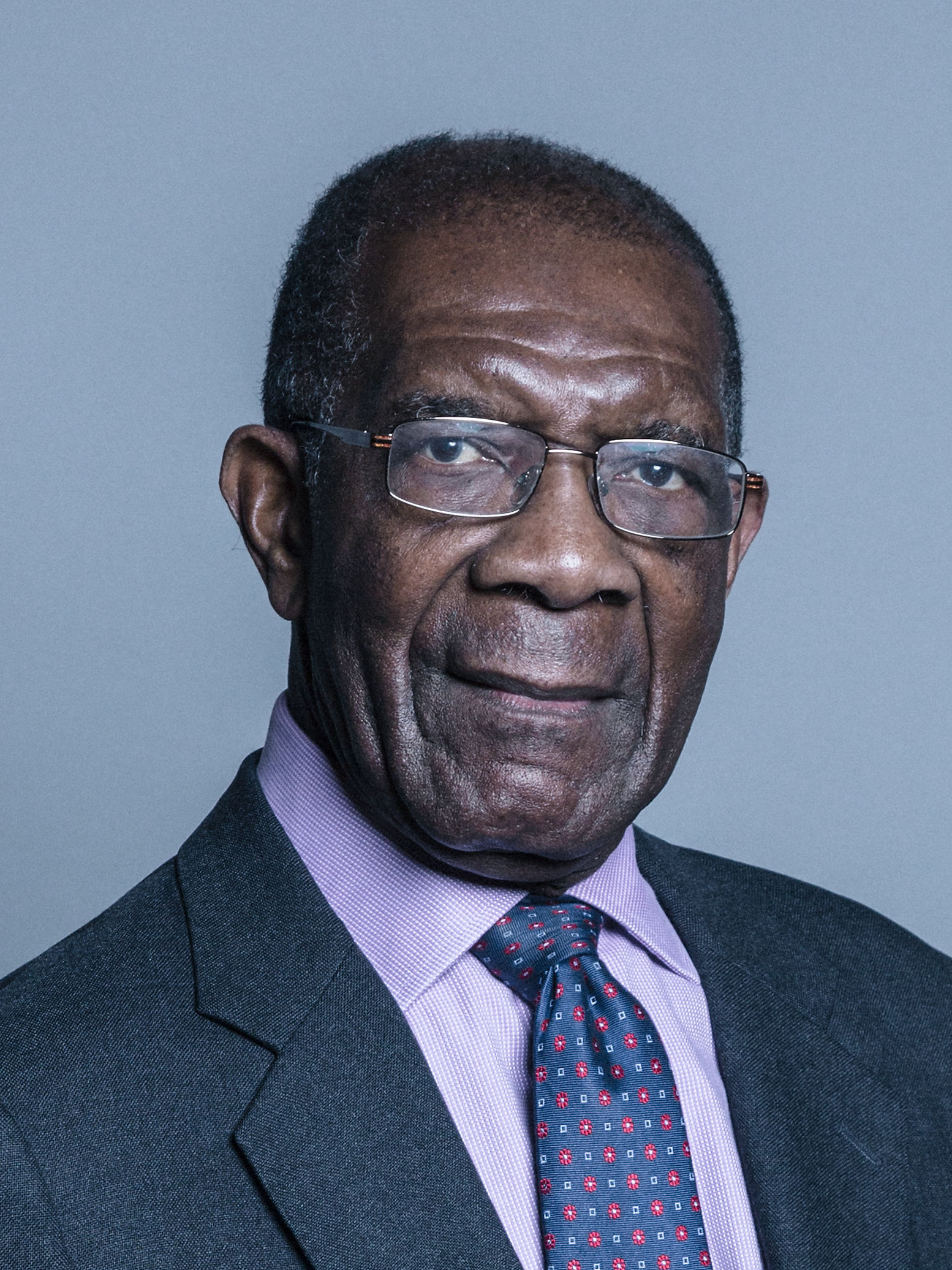
Official portrait of Bill Morris

Within 3 months, Transport and General Workers' Union leader Bill Morris expressed a desire to support the dockers by voting to establish a hardship fund and welcomed promises by foreign unions to boycott ships using the Merseyside terminals. In December 1995, three sacked dockers formed a picket line in New York which local workers refused to cross. The timing of the dispute coincided with the emergence of the World Wide Web, with dockers among the first to embrace the technology to communicate their plight beyond the national media. After 14 months, the dispute had been running longer than the miners' strike of 1984–85.

Throughout the dispute, dockers waged a high-profile public campaign for their reinstatement and allied with dockers worldwide and support groups such as Reclaim the Streets. Organised workers were generally unwilling to take solidarity action through fear of victimisation, with bitter defeats such as that of the 1985 miner's strike still fresh in memory. A Mersey Docks spokesman suggested in July 1996 that the dispute was "winding down", claiming the new workforce were 30–40 per cent more productive. Around this time, dockers rejected an offer via postal ballot to reinstate 40 jobs, with a pay-off settlement of £25,000 (equivalent to £50,181 in 2025) offered for the rest of the sacked workforce.

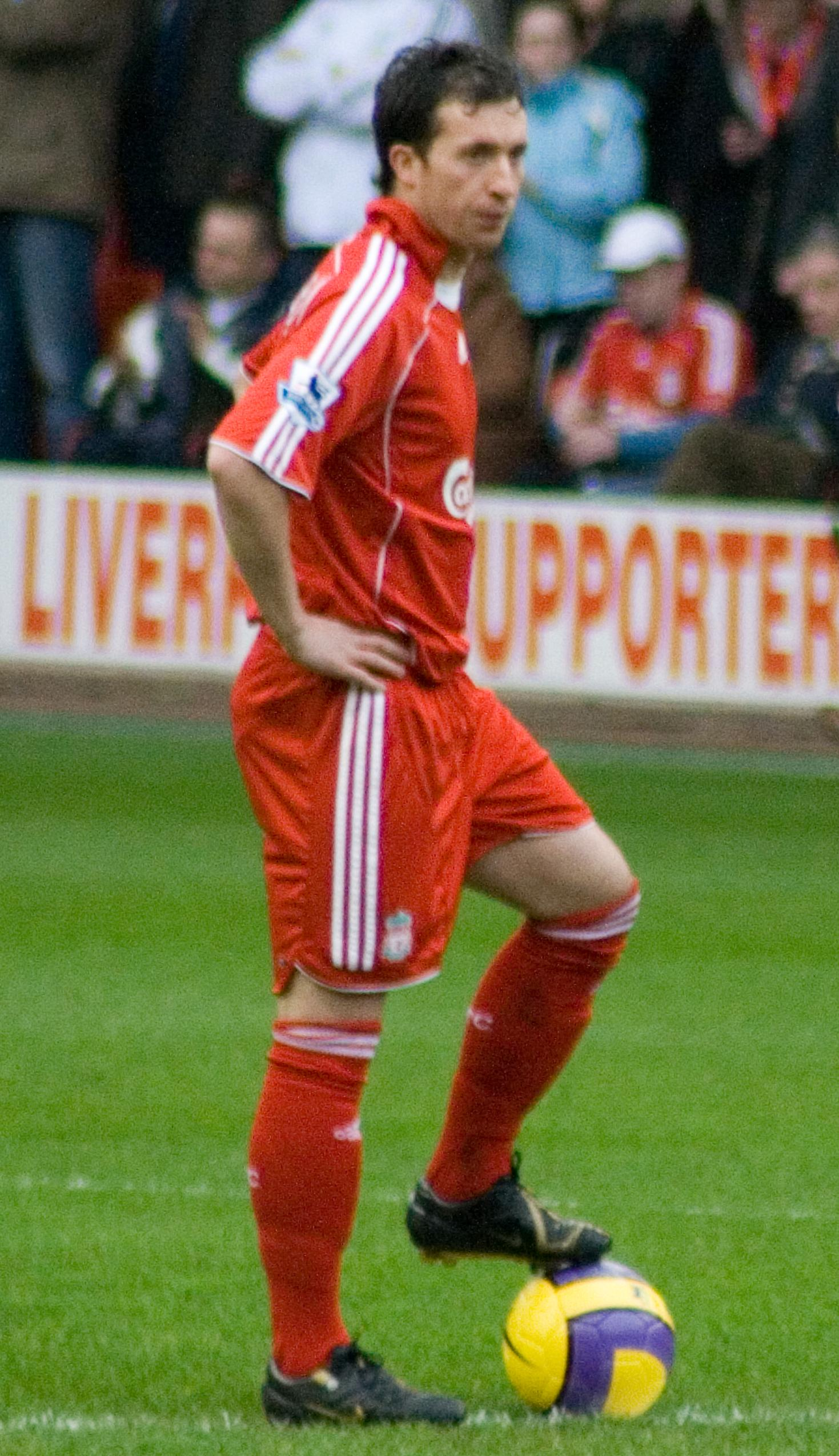
Robbie Fowler publicly expressed his support for the Dockers

A T-shirt was designed and printed in September 1996 as part of a public campaign to bring attention to the strike by incorporating the Calvin Klein "CK" into the word "doCKer" with the words "500 Liverpool dockers sacked since September 1995". The T-shirt was worn by some celebrities, most famously by Robbie Fowler during a goal celebration while playing for Liverpool. Some shirts, costing £5 each, were sold at music gigs and in total reached sales of nearly 50,000 and helped towards the family hardship fund.

=== Latter stages ===
"We dared to fight against the anti-trade union laws of the Conservative government. But now there was a Labour government. For years these leaders have been telling the workers that we cannot act against the Tory anti-trade union laws. Wait for a Labour government and then we will get representative democracy. With this cry ringing in their ears, thousands of workers were left to fight alone and were victimised."

— John Davis, dockworkers' leader, recalling the latter stages of the dispute.

Mersey Docks' then chief executive, Trevor Furlong, suggested talks towards reaching a settlement were ongoing in February 1997, although suggested the resistance from dockers in not holding a secret ballot was hindering progress talks. Hopes of a resolution were high upon the election of Tony Blair's Labour government in 1997 given the government's 14% financial share in Mersey Docks, although the dockers were unaware that the new government would seek to retain previous economic policies and offer no help towards resolving the dispute.

The country's trade union establishment made its expression of contempt clear during the 1997 Trades Union Congress annual conference, suggesting the only place for dockers who had sought support of trade unionists worldwide was "on the pavement outside the hall, with a collection bucket". The Transport and General Workers' Union biennial conference in July 1997 called upon the new Labour government to intervene and support efforts to reinstate sacked dockworkers, but the government failed to offer any support.

In the latter part of 1997, Merseyside Police increased their presence and actions towards dockers picketing, with 13 dockers arrested in the weeks around August 1997, three of whom were shop stewards, while other dockers who had previously been arrested were prohibited by bail conditions from being within 25 foot of the picket line.

=== Settlement ===
Mersey Docks made numerous offers throughout the course of the dispute, which were all voted down by the picketing dockers. In October 1997, Morris ordered a postal secret ballot to determine whether the dockers would accept a £28,000 settlement redundancy package (equivalent to £55,195 in 2025); of the 310 ballots counted, only 97 ballots, representing just under a third of responses, voted to accept. Following the ballot, Mersey Docks made the same offer on an individual basis for a limited period of time, with assurances that it would remain confidential. In an attempt to break the deadlock, sacked dockers offered to establish a direct supply unit controlled by the workers, to replace casual contracted labour on the basis that Mersey Docks reinstated the sacked workforce. This proposal was rejected by Mersey Docks, who instead continued to pursue a casual and privatised workforce.

By January 1998, 258 former dockworkers remained in dispute, following 60 choosing to accept the settlement from Mersey Docks the previous October. A former foreman called on Mersey Docks to return to the negotiating table, believing the dispute had gone on for too long and was affecting livelihoods. Mersey Docks refused to enter into any further negotiations, re-affirming their position that October's offer was final. Less than two weeks later on 26 January 1998, the dockers ultimately accepted a settlement with continuity of pensions but without job reinstatement. The settlement was limited to around two-thirds of the former workforce, with the other third receiving financial support from the sale of a music CD titled "Rock The Dock". At a length of two and a half years, the dispute became one of the longest in British industrial relations history.

== Aftermath ==
The strike failed in its declared objectives, although it provided a modern example of social movement unionism in the United Kingdom, with the Socialist Workers Party describing Liverpool as "symbolic of the collective solidarity inside the working class movement". The Socialist Party said nothing further could have been done, suggesting that "the union needs reclaiming" for the working class. There is no single reason for the length of the dispute, although the area's militant history of trade unionism, coupled with a lack of other jobs the dockers could take, were contributing factors.

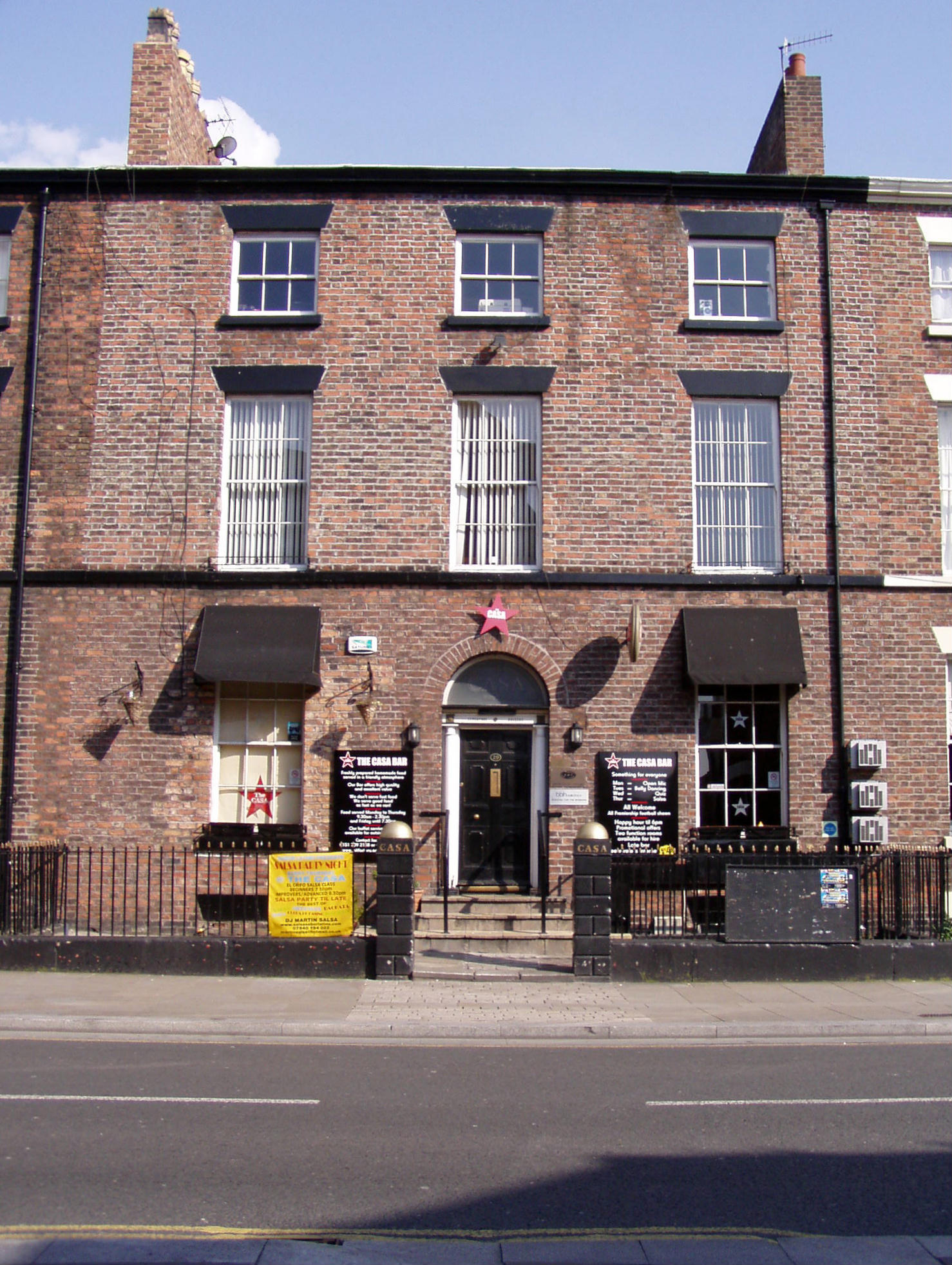
The Casa on Hope Street, Liverpool

Following the dispute, some dockers bought a semi-derelict bar named The Casablanca on Hope Street in Liverpool city centre, later renamed to The Casa. Opened on Christmas Eve 2000, the bar was purchased using the £127,000 fee received from writing the Channel 4 television drama Dockers about the events and was opened as a community hub that offered advice and help for those in need. Between the years 2000–2015, an estimated £10 million worth of free advice was offered. The funding source is primarily from the main bar, whilst small offices on the upper floors provide support and training facilities.

With the passage of time, the bitterness felt among dockworkers had reduced. In 2012, General Secretary of Unite the Union Len McCluskey, himself a former dockworker, invited sacked dockers to return to the docks for the first time since the dispute ended. The intention was to help bring unionisation back to the docks by offering sacked dockers the opportunity to share their experience and knowledge with the 280 dockworkers in Liverpool.

== Union involvement ==
The union did not officially recognise the dispute, justifying their stance by suggesting anti-union laws prevented them from further involvement. The union was keen to avoid financial penalties and wanted to ensure a continued working relationship with Mersey Docks. All aspects of the dispute were controlled and managed by the union, via the Shop Stewards Committee, which declared full solidarity with the leadership. Despite this, within 18 months, relations between the union and dockers had deteriorated, in particular with Bill Morris, who came under scrutiny for misleading statements. Although the union did not officially support the dispute, it is believed to have contributed up to £700,000 (equivalent to £1,358,726 in 2025) towards the dockers' hardship fund and supported them with premises towards helping to negotiate a settlement.

One docker discovered through a discussion with the General Secretary of the Fire Brigades Union that they had been willing to grant dockers an interest free loan of £250,000 (equivalent to £501,809 in 2025) to help towards running costs, yet the dockers' own General Secretary had blocked it, indicating the disparity in support between other trade unions and the dockers' own union. The dispute leaders sought no industrial support from other unions, instead opting to organise an international campaign in the hope of gaining support and backing from worldwide trade unions. Whilst the objective in seeking international support was to hope Mersey Docks backtracked on their stance to casualise the workforce, the ultimate consequence was isolation of the dockers, particularly at a national level.

== Responses ==
=== Media coverage ===
The national press did not start covering the dispute until around two months after it started. The BBC's Liverpool correspondent, Kevin Bocquet, disclosed that he had covered the dispute in only four pieces for television and radio apiece within the first fourteen months of the dispute, suggesting editors found it less than appealing to cover the news as they questioned how it affected the economy. Initially, little was published about the dispute among the national media, who tended to portray the dockers as "dinosaurs from another age". The national media did not take notice until international organisations became aware via Internet communication channels, who offered their support, whilst observers at the time suggested that British newspapers only started covering the dispute once the international press became aware and converged upon Liverpool.

The Internet offered an opportunity for dockers to engage with worldwide trade unionists without needing to channel messages via their own union and government. Dockers concluded within the first few months that their best chance to gain support was by spreading their message globally and hoping dockers worldwide supported their plight, such as boycotting ships sailing to or from Liverpool. Picket lines abroad were also arranged to work around the legal restrictions of setting up secondary picket lines in Britain.

Until late 1996, ITV show This Morning was broadcast at Liverpool's Albert Dock, yet failed to mention or discuss the dispute and struggles of dockers picketing just miles away from the studio; when questioned, the programme producer suggested that "people just don't want to know".

=== Political reaction ===
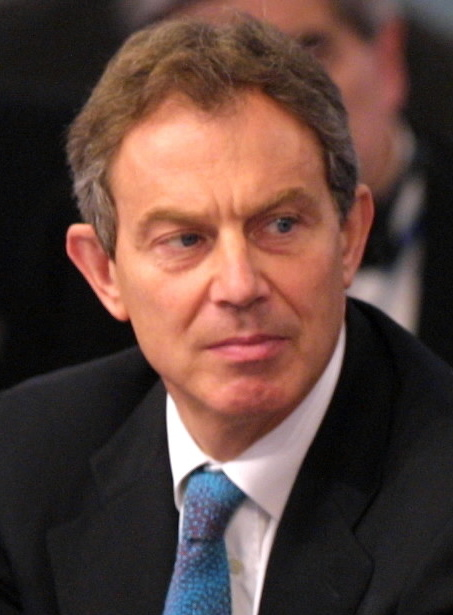
Tony Blair in 2002

In late 1997, the newly elected Labour government discarded appeals to its leadership and former hard-left to reverse anti-trade union legislation enacted by the former Conservative administration. Appeals from dockers for the government to use its 14% share in Mersey Docks to help towards their reinstatement were unsuccessful. Consequently, it brought about a request from the government for the union leader Bill Morris to hastily end the dispute, at the former dockers' expense, with the termination of all hardship payments and the acceptance that the jobs would not be reinstated. Tony Blair believed the dockers were ultimately responsible for the defeat through an unwillingness to alter their own views and "long-standing abuse of monopoly power" and would later provoke a trade dispute in 2002 following the collapse of relations with union bosses with his stance on the 2002 firefighter's dispute; Bill Morris suggested around this time that it was difficult to find differences between the Labour and Conservative parties.

=== Worldwide solidarity ===
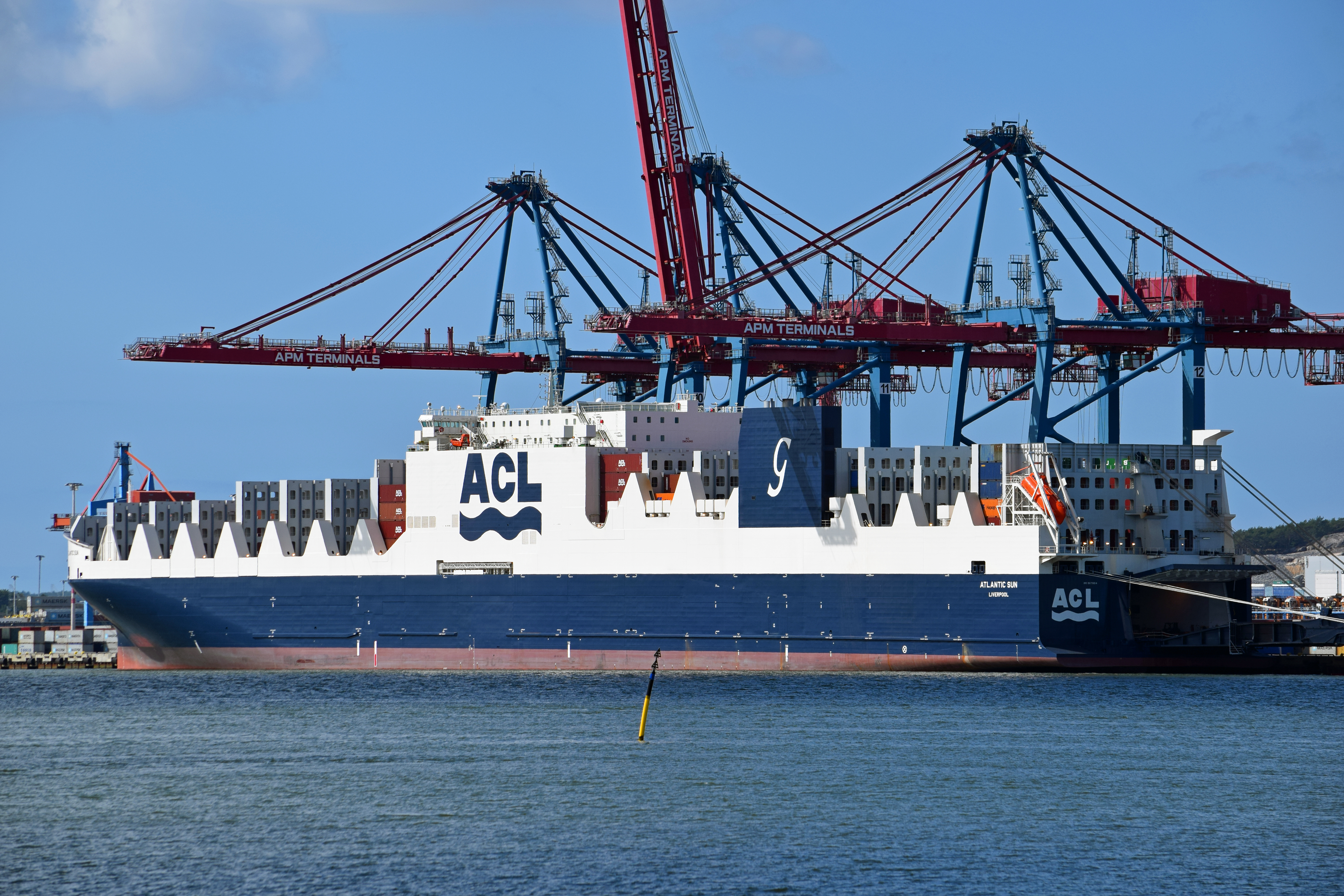
Atlantic Container Lines ship

Dockers worldwide aligned themselves in support and solidarity of the Liverpool dockers. In December 1995, three months after the start of the dispute, dockers in New York refused to cross a picket line set up by three Liverpool dockers and nearly cost Liverpool the business of American shipping company Atlantic Containers, who threatened to pull out of the port. The shipping company, then one of Mersey Docks' largest customers with an estimated annual value of £4 million (equivalent to £8,028,936 in 2025), ultimately did pull out of the port in June 1996, citing the sympathy action taken by American dockers, although resumed services the following month. On 20 January 1997, almost a year before the dispute would end, the dockers designated it the day of "international solidarity", with solidarity actions in around 27 countries including unlawful work standstills. Beyond moral support, Japanese dockers contributed around 1 million yen, whilst the dockers' union in America donated nearly $100,000.

In September 1997, 30 ports worldwide halted work for 24 hours, bringing the US East Coast to a standstill. Elsewhere during the dispute, ports in Japan and South Africa came to a halt, with dockers in the latter stopping their work "in solidarity with the Liverpool dockers who stood by us during apartheid". On 8 September 1997, around 50,000 dockers worldwide in 16 countries acted in solidarity. In November 1997, Jimmy Nolan, Merseyside Port Shop Steward secretary said:

Mersey Docks had suffered a 23 per cent reduction in the number of ships using Liverpool since the dismissal in September 1995. This is not only a 'British' question. We express our deepest gratitude to waterfront workers acting in solidarity, but they are also acting on their behalf. Shipping lines depend for their profits on fast turnaround in the ports. They want a docile workforce to put up with massive and inhuman attacks on working conditions and trade union rights.

== Financial impact ==
=== Mersey Docks ===
During 1996, the dispute cost Mersey Docks around £800,000 (equivalent to £1,605,787 in 2025). Profits for Mersey Docks fell for the first time in 10 years in 1995, to £31.7 million, down from £33.6 million the year before with the trend continuing into the following year. Previous to this, between 1988 and 1994, profits had increased nearly five-fold. The value of shares in Mersey Docks varied during the dispute, such as the suspension and resumption of ACL services in 1996, the latter which resulted in a share spike of 10 per cent.

Picket lines which blocked and restricted access to the port cost Mersey Docks "millions of pounds" through lost labour hours and shipment delays.

Company profits over a ten-year period, 1986 – 1996
Year	1986	1987	1988	1989	1990	1991	1992	1993	1994	1995	1996
Annual profit (£ million)	3.1	5.0	7.2	8.3	10.8	13.2	15.2	20.9	33.6	31.7	29.6
Year-on-year difference (£ million)	–	2.1	2.2	1.1	2.5	2.4	2.0	5.7	12.7	-1.9	-2.1

=== Hardship payments and donations ===
Many of the dockers faced financial hardship during the course of the dispute, with more than 90 dockers' homes under repossession orders by 1997. Donations were received from the public through postal orders or money in envelopes, sometimes anonymously, as well as having grocery shopping paid for or donated to a doorstep. An 84-year-old former miner's widow turned up at the picket line in late 1997, offering savings left to her by her late husband to help towards the hardship fund.

By the end of 1997, dockers' families faced unmanageable financial circumstances, with the weekly £12 union payments inadequate (an official strike would have warranted a payment three times that amount). Mersey Docks kept their severance offer of £28,000 available for acceptance, which the most desperate initially accepted, followed by a stewards' recommendation to end the dispute for the sake of all remaining striking dockers. By the end of the dispute, four dockers had died. Celebrities such as Jo Brand and Noel Gallagher also held fundraisers to help towards financial costs and needs.

== In popular culture ==
British director Ken Loach made a documentary about the strike, The Flickering Flame, in 1996. A group of sacked dockers wrote the script for a film about their experiences, titled Dockers, with the help of Liverpool writer Jimmy McGovern and the author Irvine Welsh. The film was broadcast by Channel 4 in July 1999 and portrayed the union leader Bill Morris as a traitor. Although some lines are taken in verbatim, others are written as real life events experienced by families of the dockers.

Anarchist pop group Chumbawamba performed their single Tubthumping live at the 1998 Brit Awards, changing the lyrics to criticise New Labour's handling of the Liverpool dockers' dispute, and later doused Deputy Prime Minister John Prescott with iced water in protest.

Billy Bragg's song Never Cross a Picket Line was featured on the Rock The Dock benefit album in 1998, released to support Liverpool dockers and their families during the dispute.

== See also ==
- Liverpool docks strikes
- Social Movement Unionism
- Transport & General Workers' Union (T&G)
- United Socialist Party (UK)
