= Blade on the Feather =

1980 television film by Richard Loncraine

- Deep Cover U.S. VHS cover
- Written by: Dennis Potter
- Directed by: Richard Loncraine
- Starring: Tom Conti; Donald Pleasence; Denholm Elliott; Kika Markham; Phoebe Nicholls
- Country of origin: United Kingdom

Production
- Producers: Kenith Trodd; Tony Wharmby
- Running time: 82 minutes

Original release
- Network: ITV
- Release: 19 October 1980

Blade on the Feather is a television drama by Dennis Potter, broadcast by ITV on 19 October 1980 as the first in a loosely connected trilogy of plays exploring language and betrayal. A pastiche of the John Le Carré spy thriller and transmitted eleven months after Anthony Blunt was exposed as the 'fourth man', the drama combines two of Potter's major themes: the visitation motif and political disillusionment. The play's title is taken from "The Eton Boating Song".

== Synopsis ==
Professor Jason Cavendish is the septuagenarian author of Cloud Cape, a children's fantasy novel. He lives in a secluded cliff-top mansion with his second wife Linda, his 18-year-old daughter Christabel and Mr Hill, his butler and personal secretary. They are visited one day by Daniel Young, who claims to be writing a thesis on political allegory in children's literature. After saving Cavendish's life when the old man has a seizure, Daniel is invited to stay by Linda and Christabel who fight for his affections. Mr Hill, meanwhile, is suspicious of Daniel's motives and concerned by Cavendish's reluctance to show him what he is writing.

Daniel seduces Christabel and, unknown to the others, murders Linda. Daniel reveals to Cavendish that his true name is Daniel Cartwright, and that his father Andrew was a British intelligence officer who was murdered by Cavendish while escorting a Soviet defector to the British embassy. Cavendish leads Daniel to a summer house at the bottom of the garden where the author reveals he has been writing his memoirs, implicating himself and Mr Hill, as well as several high-profile MPs, as Soviet sympathizers. Daniel convinces Cavendish to surrender the papers and shoot himself; the old man obliges, having grown weary of the enforced secrecy of his final years.

Having discovered Linda's body, Hill arrives at the summer house to execute Daniel. The young man reveals that he has been sent by the KGB at Hill's request to prevent Cavendish from blowing their cover, and that Linda was a sleeper agent for MI6. Daniel leaves Hill to clean up the mess and leaves. The remorseful Hill approaches the summer house to attend his beloved friend's body.

== Principal cast ==
- Tom Conti as Daniel Young
- Donald Pleasence as Jason Cavendish
- Denholm Elliott as Mr Hill
- Kika Markham as Linda
- Phoebe Nicholls as Christabel
- Gareth Forwood as Doctor Bell
- Alvar Lidell as newsreader

== Production ==
Blade on the Feather was originally conceived as a feature film to be produced by Potter and Kenith Trodd's own production company Pennies From Heaven Ltd., but problems with funding led to the drama being part of an arrangement with London Weekend Television as the first of nine single plays: all produced by PFH Ltd. and commissioned by Michael Grade for broadcast on ITV between 1980 and 1981. Six of the plays were to be written by Potter, while the remaining three were to be shared between Jim Allen and an undisclosed writer. In the event, budget cuts and scheduling problems meant that only three plays were produced: Blade on the Feather, Rain on the Roof and Cream in My Coffee. All three dramas were shot on 16mm film stock and featured extensive location work on the Isle of Wight.

In Potter on Potter, the dramatist told Graham Fuller that although Cavendish is more closely based on Kim Philby than any of the other Cambridge spies he is not intended to be a fictional version of that figure. Philby is mentioned several times throughout the play, as are Guy Burgess and Donald Maclean: all of whom in the drama were apparently recruited by Cavendish. Nevertheless, Cavendish and Hill are an amalgamation of the three spies; despite the old man's denigration of the trio as 'drunks, queers and lefties,' Cavendish and Hill are both represented as heavy drinkers, Hill's faith in Sovietism is said to be bordering on fanaticism by the disillusioned Cavendish and the friendship between the two men is presented with a distinctly homoerotic undertone (most notably in their joint recitation of "The Eton Boating Song").

Director Richard Loncraine claimed he heavily rewrote several scenes in Potter's original script because they were unusable.

== Structure and themes ==
The play contains none of the non-naturalistic flourishes that dominate much of Potter's work, however it does contain two flashback sequences that hint at Daniel's motives in coming to the house. The first of these flashbacks shows the murder of Daniel's father as he escorts the Soviet defector to the British Embassy, while the second features the young Daniel and his father by the polar bear enclosure at London Zoo; Daniel drops a book he is carrying into the water, whereupon it is fished out by a zoo keeper and revealed to be Cloud Cape. Daniel later states to Mr Hill that he bears no malice towards Cavendish for his father's murder as their infrequent trips to the zoo are all he remembers about him. What the audience presumes to be a fond memory therefore becomes an unreliable one and ties into one of Potter's major themes of memory as a malleable source.

The visitation motif that Potter explored in several of his other works (see below) is an important narrative thread in Blade on the Feather. In the play, Daniel is named after his biblical counterpart ('a Daniel come to sit in judgement') and in his role as disruptive outsider ultimately restores peace to the troubled household.

The central theme of Blade on the Feather is betrayal—both political and personal—and throughout the course of the play each character betrays the other. In addition to Cavendish and Hill betraying their country, Cavendish betrays Hill by writing his memoirs, while Hill betrays Cavendish by calling in Daniel to execute his old friend; Linda betrays Cavendish in her role as a sleeper agent brought into the household to spy on her husband, while Christabel betrays her father by sleeping with the visitor. Daniel's role as KGB assassin means that instead of seeking vengeance for his father's death he is ultimately protecting Cavendish's cover, therefore betraying his father.

Political disillusionment is another key theme; the consequences of an individual's cynicism towards an established social order leading them to more prescriptive ideologies. Cavendish reveals to Daniel that he was drawn to the communist fervor at Cambridge in the 1930s as a means of escaping the rigidities of his traditional upper-class English background, only to find himself tarnished by his association with Sovietism. When Christabel attempts to reassure him that their way of life is safe following Thatcher's victory at the general election, Cavendish tells her:

There isn't any sort of England someone of my generation would think he had inherited [...] Take away the pudding and the baked jam roll and the custard and there isn't very much left.

== Broadcast and reception ==
Blade on the Feather was broadcast on ITV on 19 October 1980 and attracted favourable reviews.

Denholm Elliott won the BAFTA Best Actor award in 1981 for his performance. The play also won for its graphics (Pat Gavin) and was nominated in four other categories.

== Intertextuality ==
Potter explored political defection and its consequences in Traitor (1971), Gorky Park (1983), The Singing Detective (1986) and Cold Lazarus (1996).

The visitation motif plays a central role in The Confidence Course (1965), Shaggy Dog (1968), Angels Are So Few (1970), Joe's Ark (1974), Schmoedipus (1975), Brimstone and Treacle (1976), Rain on the Roof (1980), Track 29 (1987) and Secret Friends (1992).

Daniel's anecdote about the Pakistani waiter sweeping up in a fast food restaurant and the outraged response this provokes from a disgruntled diner is taken from Joe's Ark, in which Dennis Waterman's character reacts in the same way after receiving news of his sister's terminal illness.

== Commercial releases ==
This filmed play has been issued in Region 1 and 2 DVD along with other Potter works for LWT. In the United States, it was released on VHS tape under the title Deep Cover (Prism/Paramount) in 1990.

== General sources ==
- Humphrey Carpenter, Dennis Potter: A Biography; 1998
- Graham Fuller (ed.), Potter on Potter; 1993
- W. Stephen Gilbert, Fight & Kick & Bite: The Life and Work of Dennis Potter; 1995
