= Dockers (film) =

1999 British drama television film by Bill Anderson

- Written by: Jimmy McGovern; Irvine Welsh
- Directed by: Bill Anderson
- Starring: Ken Stott; Crissy Rock; Peter Armitage; Ricky Tomlinson; David Parkinson; Christine Tremarco
- Country of origin: United Kingdom
- Original language: English

Production
- Producer: Sally Hibbin
- Running time: 91 minutes
- Production company: Prism Leisure
- Budget: £1.5 million

Original release
- Network: Channel 4
- Release: 11 July 1999

Dockers is a 1999 British feature-length television drama produced for Channel 4 about the struggles of a small group of Liverpool dockers who were sacked and subsequently spent nearly 2 and a half years picketing during the Liverpool Dockers' Strike of 1995 to 1998.

Although the credited screenwriters for the drama were Liverpool screenwriter Jimmy McGovern and Scottish novelist Irvine Welsh the drama was largely written by sacked dock workers and previous union members under the supervision of the two screenwriters. This unusual writing method was considered an experiment in 'democratic television' and was documented in a separate Channel 4 documentary, Writing the Wrongs.

== Plot ==
Dockers dramatises the real-life story of the 1995–1998 Liverpool dockers' dispute. The film begins when a small group of dockers are sacked after refusing to accept unfair changes to their overtime conditions. In a show of solidarity, hundreds of their fellow workers refuse to cross the picket line in an act of collective resistance, resulting in all of them being dismissed by the Mersey Docks and Harbour Company.

At the centre of the story is Tommy (Ken Stott), a veteran docker, whose son Andy is among the five men whose dismissal triggers the strike. As the strike unfolds, friendships and loyalties are tested, while families face eviction and marriages are put under pressure. Tensions escalate when Macca (Ricky Tomlinson), a friend and fellow docker, becomes a scab when he crosses the picket line and returns to work, fracturing long-standing relationships.

As the dockers fight on, they find themselves abandoned by once trusted institutions. Their union leadership refuses to support their action and allies in the Labour Party remain silent. Former trade union leader Bill Morris is portrayed as a traitor who undermines the strike both publicly and internally.

== Production ==
=== Development ===
A group of dockers held regular workshops with the production team over a period of 14 months. Once a week, they met with Jimmy McGovern and Irvine Welsh, who were both supporters of the strike and who contributed towards developing the script. While scab workers were originally not set to feature in any meaningful capacity, McGovern persuaded the dockers writing team to consider them as being crucial to the narrative, with focus on Tomlinson's character who gives a speech explaining why he crossed the picket line.

=== Casting ===
Around 200 of the dockers were employed as extras. Roles for some notable figures were also played by sacked dockers themselves, such as John Ryan, who portrayed his former boss Trevor Furlong, the managing director of Mersey Docks and Harbour Company.

Ricky Tomlinson, who has a notable role portraying Macca, a docker who crosses the picket line, had supported the dockers during the dispute. Tomlinson later said he had to take time to consider if he wanted to accept the role, particularly as he served prison time in 1972 while striking for better conditions. Despite his reservations, he said that he trusted McGovern and expressed that "anyone concerned with justice and seeing people get a raw deal should watch this film".

=== Filming ===
Filming started on 7 March 1999. When choosing locations for the film, the Transport and General Workers' Union refused to allow filming to take place within their premises, with former dockers being removed from the building at one point when actor Robert Carlyle came to offer support in a scripting session. Similarly, Mersey Docks and Harbour company refused permission to film scenes at Liverpool docks, so instead, the production team used the former Cammell Laird shipyard in Birkenhead, which had been disused since 1993. Scenes showing the docks in operation were filmed in Dublin. Other scenes were filmed at quayside in Ellesmere Port, which was modified to resemble Liverpool's Canada Dock.

Scenes portraying around five large mass meetings were all filmed in a single day on 25 March 1999, with a spokesperson saying that the production team felt it would be easier for all participants if they filmed all the meeting sequences on the same day. Around 100 dockers were hired as extras, while some also had small speaking parts.

The television film cost around £1.5 to produce.

== Release ==
The television film premiered on 8 July 1999 at the Odeon Cinema, in London Road, Liverpool. Marked as a fundraising event, attendees were asked to pay £10 per ticket as a donation towards the dockers' charity "The Initiative Factory". It had its television debut on Channel 4 three days later, on 11 July.

== Critical response ==
Writing for the Liverpool Echo, reviewer Peter Grant, who came from a family of dockers, described it as a powerful story that shows the writer's skill at using conversation to demonstrate life's unfairness. The union described the film as "an insult".
