= Kenith Trodd =

British television producer (1935–2026)

- Born: 28 May 1935; Southampton, Hampshire, England
- Died: 1 March 2026 (aged 90)
- Occupations: Film and television producer

Kenneth George Trodd (28 May 1935 – 1 March 2026), professionally known as Kenith Trodd, was a British film and television producer best known for his professional association with television playwright Dennis Potter.

== Early life ==
The son of a crane driver, Trodd was born on 28 May 1935 in Southampton, Hampshire, and raised in the Christian fundamentalist Plymouth Brethren. A graduate of Oxford University, he worked as a university teacher in West Africa.

== Career ==
Trodd began his career in television as an assistant to Roger Smith, script editor of The Wednesday Play in 1964. In that year, Trodd changed his given name from Kenneth to Kenith, based on association with the word 'zenith'. A problem with the script of Vote, Vote, Vote for Nigel Barton first brought Trodd into contact with Dennis Potter, the play's author. A desire to adapt a short story for an episode of BBC2's Thirty-Minute Theatre, led to a phone call from its writer, Simon Gray, beginning Trodd's association with him and Gray's work in drama.

In 1968, with colleagues Tony Garnett, Ken Loach, Potter and others, he set up Kestrel Productions, a company which was affiliated with London Weekend Television. From now on Trodd worked as a producer, and the short-lived Kestrel saw the beginning of Trodd's professional relationship with Dennis Potter with Moonlight on the Highway (1969) and Lay Down Your Arms (1970), Potter's first play produced in colour. British Sounds (aka, See You at Mao, 1970), a film directed by Jean-Luc Godard and Jean-Henri Roger, which Trodd produced, had a particularly deleterious effect on Kestrel's relationship with LWT, who banned it. In 1970, he resigned after management changes at LWT.

During a short period at Granada Television, he produced Home and Away (1972), written by Julia Jones and directed by Roy Battersby and Donald McWhinnie. Trodd returned to the BBC, and worked on Play for Today. On an annual freelance contract, it was not renewed in 1976. The BBC's Personnel Department objected to Trodd's political contacts; he had attended meetings in the early 1970s of the Workers' Revolutionary Party, which attracted a small minority in the media, but Trodd had never joined the organisation. A letter signed by Trodd's colleagues was sent to Alasdair Milne, Director of Programmes, Television, and Ian Trethowan, Director General of the BBC. The BBC backed down and Trodd was reappointed.

Following the success of Potter's serial Pennies from Heaven (1978), Trodd and Potter reasserted their desire for autonomy and formed a new production company which had an arrangement with LWT. Budgetary problems meant that the connection was again short-lived, and only three Potter-scripted productions were completed, Blade on the Feather, Rain on the Roof and Cream in My Coffee (all 1980).

Unlike Potter, Trodd was committed to the move to shooting television drama on film, instead of the electronic multi-camera television studio, and oversaw early productions in the BBC's Screen Two strand in 1985. At the end of the 1980s, Trodd fell out with Potter over his Blackeyes (1989) project, but the two men repaired their professional relationship shortly before Potter's death from pancreatic cancer in 1994.

Trodd's other credits include the film A Month in the Country (1987), adapted from the J. L. Carr novel by Simon Gray, and the Stephen Poliakoff scripted Caught on a Train (1980) which was shown in the BBC2 Playhouse series.

On 11 December 2011, Trodd attended a screening of Potter's rediscovered Emergency – Ward 9, on which he worked as script editor, at the BFI Southbank in London, introducing the play and answering questions afterwards about its production and his broader working relationship with Potter and Simon Gray.

== Death ==
Trodd died on 1 March 2026, at the age of 90.
