= Joseph Bullman =

English documentary and drama director

Joseph Bullman is an English documentary and drama director, known for his political films, including factual dramas Killed By My Debt (2018), The Left Behind (2019) and Life and Death in the Warehouse (2022), and documentaries The Man Who Bought Mustique (2000), The Seven Sins of England (2007) and The Secret History of Our Streets (2012–14). Bullman's films have received six BAFTA nominations.

== Career ==
The Man Who Bought Mustique (2000), about Lord Glenconner, an English lord, was nominated for BAFTA and Royal Television Society (RTS) awards and was a favourite of David Bowie.

England is Mine/Dogumentary (2002), made with Lars von Trier's Dogme 95 movement, is a film about an English football hooligan finding love and redemption at the 2002 FIFA World Cup in Japan.

The Seven Sins of England (2007), shot in Bullman's home town, filmed modern day binge drinkers and hooligans delivering the real words of Edwardian yobs, 12th century binge drinkers and Victorian louts. It was BAFTA-nominated and won the Grierson Innovation Award and a RTS Award.

Each episode of The Secret History of Our Streets (2012–14) depicted the history of a single London street. It was BAFTA-nominated and won a RTS award for the Best History Series and the Grierson Audience Award.

In 2018 Bullman turned to scripted drama, dramatising real life stories. His first drama, Killed by my Debt (2018), was the true story of Jerome Rogers, a young gig economy worker, who, overwhelmed by the pressure of debt arising from two traffic fines, took his own life. The film led to a national campaign and calls for reform in the UK Parliament. It won the BAFTA and RTS awards for Best Single Drama, and Broadcast awards for Best Single Drama, Best Digital Drama and Best Multichannel Drama. Bullman dedicated the BAFTA to Rogers' family who campaigned for a change to the law.

The Left Behind (2019) tells the story of Gethin, who, with no secure job, housing or future, gets drawn into a far-right hate crime. The film is based on research in Britain's 'left behind' communities, and the work of professor Hilary Pilkington, who spent three years embedded with an English Defence League group. The film won BAFTA and RTS awards for Best Single Drama, and was nominated for five BAFTA Cymru awards – Best Television Drama, Best Director: Fiction, Best Actor, Best Screenplay, Best Make Up.

In 2022, Bullman created and directed Life and Death in the Warehouse. It was written by Helen Black.

Bullman is writer and director on upcoming Channel 4 docudrama Dirty Business about a decade-long investigation into sewage contaminated water.

== Filmography ==
=== Documentaries ===
Year	Film	Role	Awards and Nominations
2000	The Man Who Bought Mustique (C4)	Director	Nominations: BAFTA Best Single Documentary; RTS Best Single Documentary
2002	Dogumentary: England is Mine	Director	
2007	The Seven Sins of England (C4)	Director/Creator	Nominations: BAFTA Best Director, BAFTA Best Editing (Oliver Huddlestone, Mark Harrowes) BAFTA Best Photography (Mark Wolf) Awards: Grierson, Innovation; RTS, Education
2012–2014	The Secret History of Our Streets (BBC)	Director/Creator	Nominations: BAFTA Best Factual Series, BAFTA Best Editing; Broadcast, Televisual and British Press Guild: Best Documentary Series Awards: RTS Best History Series; Grierson, Best History Series and Grierson, Audience Award

=== Dramas ===
Year	Film	Role	Awards and Nominations
2018	Killed By My Debt (BBC)	Director	Nomination: BAFTA Best Leading Actor (Chance Perdomo) Awards: BAFTA Best Single Drama; RTS Best Single Drama; Broadcast Awards: Best Single Drama, Best Digital Programme; Broadcast Digital Awards: Best Drama
2019	The Left Behind (BBC)	Director	Nominations: BAFTA Cymru awards: Best Television Drama, Best Director: Fiction, Best Actor, Best Screenplay, Best Make-up. Awards: RTS Best Single Drama; BAFTA Best Single Drama
2022	Life and Death in the Warehouse (BBC)	Director	
