= Cream in My Coffee =

1980 television film directed by Gavin Millar

- Written by: Dennis Potter
- Directed by: Gavin Millar
- Starring: Lionel Jeffries; Peggy Ashcroft; Peter Chelsom; Shelagh McLeod; Martin Shaw; Faith Brook
- Country of origin: United Kingdom

Production
- Producers: Kenith Trodd; Tony Wharmby
- Running time: 82 minutes

Original release
- Network: ITV
- Release: 2 November 1980

Related
- Rain on the Roof (1980); Tender is the Night (1985)

Cream in My Coffee is a television drama by Dennis Potter, broadcast on ITV on 2 November 1980 as the last in a loosely connected trilogy of plays exploring language and betrayal. A juxtaposition between youth and old age, the play combines a non-linear narrative with the use of popular music to heighten dramatic tension, a feature of much of Potter's work. Cream in My Coffee was awarded the Prix Italia for best drama in 1981 and Peggy Ashcroft gained a BAFTA Best Actress award in 1981. The play's title is taken from the popular song "You're the Cream in My Coffee", from the 1929 Broadway musical Hold Everything!

== Synopsis ==
In the summer of 1934, young lovers Bernard and Jean head to the five star Grand Hotel in Eastbourne for a dirty weekend. Bernard comes from an affluent middle-class family while Jean works at the local post office; they intend to be married within a matter of months, much to the annoyance of Bernard's domineering mother.

During their stay the couple make the acquaintance of the resident dance band singer Jack Butcher, who takes a particular liking to Jean. When Bernard receives word that his father has died he returns home immediately to be at his mother's side, leaving Jean alone at the hotel. Hurt by Bernard's abandonment, Jean goes to console herself in the ballroom, where she is approached by Butcher who plies her with alcohol before taking her back to her room, where the two have sex. Despite Bernard's mother's objections to her son marrying a shop girl, Bernard returns to the hotel and marries Jean soon after.

In the summer of 1980, the elderly Bernard and Jean return to the hotel to rekindle the spark in their marriage. Bernard's earlier class-driven condescension towards Jean has turned to cruelty, constantly examining and cross-examining every comment she makes; Jean's earlier naivety and impetuousness have transformed into resignation and tolerance, despite her husband's maliciousness. The hotel has also changed since the couple last stayed there: the orchestra who once played to the residents as they took their afternoon tea has been replaced by a man on an electronic keyboard, and the ballroom holds discos rather than dances.

Bernard and Jean spend much of their holiday arguing, usually as a result of Bernard's imagined slights from his wife. Time, however, is running out and the couple are aware that with Bernard being in ill-health this may prove to be the last holiday they take together. On the final evening of their stay the couple attend a 1930s night. Bernard's mind travels back to their first time at the hotel; the rush of memory causes him to recognise the legacy of his mother's dominance, the love he once had with Jean, the significance of Jack Butcher and his own loneliness. He attacks Jean but suffers a heart attack. As St John's Ambulance men remove his body the rock band on stage launch into a rendition of "Button Up Your Overcoat".

== Production ==
Cream in My Coffee was the third play of an intended series of nine dramas produced by Potter and Kenith Trodd's own production company Pennies From Heaven Ltd. to be broadcast on ITV in 1980 and 1981. Commissioned by Michael Grade and distributed through London Weekend Television, six of the plays would be written by Potter while the remaining three were to be shared between Jim Allen and an undisclosed writer. In the event, budget cuts and scheduling problems led to only three plays being produced: Blade on the Feather, Rain on the Roof and Cream in My Coffee.

=== Principal cast ===
- Lionel Jeffries as Bernard Wilsher
- Peggy Ashcroft as Jean Wilsher
- Peter Chelsom as young Bernard
- Shelagh McLeod as young Jean
- Martin Shaw as Jack Butcher
- Faith Brook as Mrs Wilsher

== Sources ==
- Humphrey Carpenter, Dennis Potter: A Biography; 1998
- Graham Fuller (ed.), Potter on Potter; 1993
- W. Stephen Gilbert, Fight & Kick & Bite: The Life and Work of Dennis Potter; 1995
