= Life and Death in the Warehouse =

- Written by: Helen Black
- Directed by: Aysha Rafaele; Joseph Bullman
- Starring: Poppy Lee Friar; Aimee-Ffion Edwards
- Music by: Roger Goula
- Country of origin: United Kingdom
- Original language: English

Production
- Executive producer: Aysha Rafaele
- Producer: Tracie Simpson
- Running time: 59 minutes
- Production company: BBC Drama Productions

Original release
- Network: BBC Three
- Release: 7 March 2022

Life and Death in the Warehouse is a 2022 British television drama film, inspired by real stories of warehouse workers in Britain and the poor conditions they work in. It is written by Helen Black, and stars Poppy Lee Friar and Aimee-Ffion Edwards.

== Plot ==
Floor worker Alys (Friar) works in a distribution centre, under a demanding sixty-hour week on top of being pregnant. When her old friend Megan (Edwards) joins the team as a trainee manager, Alys hopes their shared history will benefit her. But, desperate to keep her new job, Megan is soon pushing Alys' work (her 'pick rate') to a dangerous extent.

== Cast ==
- Poppy Lee Friar as Alys
- Aimee-Ffion Edwards as Megan
- Aled ap Steffan as Devon
- Natalia Kostrzewa as Nadia
- Maja Laskowska as Karina
- Leon Charles as Craig
- Darren Evans as Ricky

Casting by Leigh-Ann Regan Casting Associates (LARCA), led by Leigh-Ann Regan. Casting associate Oliver Williams.

== Production ==
Black had met Aysha Rafaele and Marco Crivellari at BBC Studios, at first developing a legal drama series. Subsequently, she was asked to work on a factual drama with director Joe Bullman, drawing from his research into warehouse employees.

== Reception ==
Lucy Mangan of The Guardian awarded the film four out five stars, praising its examination of worker conditions, remarking 'Black's drama does this perfectly, aided by fine performances (including Aled ap Steffan as Alys's friend, co-worker and brave union rep Devon). It covers a lot of sociopolitical ground without forgetting to make us care about the people – those 1 million and counting – who are suffering as its footsoldiers.'. Anita Singh in The Telegraph also gave it four out five stars, calling it 'cutting'.

== Awards ==
The film has been nominated at the 2022 BAFTA Cymru Awards for Television Drama.
