= Jimmy McGovern =

English screenwriter

- Born: James Stanley McGovern; 19 September 1949 (age 77); Liverpool, England
- Occupations: Screenwriter; producer
- Years active: 1982–present

James Stanley McGovern (born 19 September 1949) is an English screenwriter and producer. He is best known for creating the drama series Cracker (1993–1995), for which he received two Edgar Awards from the Mystery Writers of America. He also received recognition for creating drama series such as Hillsborough, The Lakes, The Street, and Accused, among others. On 8 December 2021, McGovern was awarded the Freedom of The City of Liverpool in recognition of his life's work.

== Early life ==
McGovern was born in Liverpool on 19 September 1949, the son of working-class parents Jane (née Warner) and William McGovern. He was the fifth of nine children. He has a stammer, for which he received no therapy and which affects him still. Brought up a Catholic, he attended St. Francis Xavier's College which moved to the Woolton suburb of Liverpool in 1961.

== Career ==
=== Television ===
In 1982, McGovern started his TV career working on Channel 4's soap opera Brookside. He tackled many social issues in the course of the series, especially unemployment – which was at a post-war high at the time. In 1993, he created the drama serial Cracker, about the work of a fictional criminal psychologist played by Robbie Coltrane. Made by Granada Television and screened on ITV, the series was a critical and popular success, lasting until 1995. Cracker also aired in the United States, on the Arts and Entertainment cable network. McGovern's writing earned him two Edgar Awards from the Mystery Writers of America. In 1997 he created The Lakes, a drama that shared Brookside's realist setting and reused themes from Cracker, such as gambling addiction. In 2006, he created the BBC One drama, The Street; its third and final series aired in 2009.

McGovern also wrote the script for the television docudrama Hillsborough (1996), based on the events of the stadium disaster in 1989, which claimed the lives of 97 Liverpool fans at an FA Cup semi-final. Among the cast of this drama was Christopher Eccleston, who also featured in Cracker, along with former Brookside actor Ricky Tomlinson. Eccleston later said it was the most important work he'd ever done. Newspapers cited Hillsborough as a factor in a new inquiry set up in 1997.

In 2009, McGovern was the executive producer on the BBC One miniseries Moving On. His series Accused aired from 2010 to 2012 on BBC One. It followed a similar format to The Street but with a crime component. The series' writers included McGovern, Danny Brocklehurst, Alice Nutter and Shaun Duggan. It was produced by Sita Williams.

In 2012, McGovern and local Indigenous Australian writers from Sydney developed the Australian television drama series Redfern Now, set among the Indigenous Australians of the Sydney suburb of Redfern. The six-part series follows a similar format to Accused, telling the stories of six inner-city households in one street whose lives are changed by a seemingly insignificant incident. The series debuted on 1 November 2012, was produced by Blackfella Films and has been commissioned for a second series.

McGovern's anthology series Time aired on BBC One from June 2021 to October 2026. The first series was directed by Lewis Arnold. It won the BAFTA for best miniseries in 2022.

=== Film ===
McGovern wrote the screenplay for the 1994 drama, Priest.

=== Stage ===
McGovern wrote the book for the musical stage show King Cotton, which explores links between the Atlantic slave trade and industrialisation in North West England, as part of the Liverpool European Capital of Culture 2008. King Cotton premiered at the Lowry in September 2007 before moving to the Liverpool Empire.

=== Views on writing ===
McGovern has described cinema scriptwriters as being treated poorly and required to produce an abundance of drafts by successive producers. McGovern has openly criticised dramas such as Footballers' Wives lamenting the lack of quality, believable storytelling in the early 2000s. He believes that television directors are underrated. He says: "I have worked twice with David Blair" on The Lakes and The Street, "and I can tell you that he is the best there is. He can make a good project great... Why David hasn’t won the acclaim he deserves is a mystery to me".

== Filmography ==
Programme	Date	Channel	Notes
Brookside	1982–1989	Channel 4	Writer of several episodes
Coronation Street	1990	ITV	Episode #1.3115 (writer)
ScreenPlay	1990	BBC Two	Series 5, episode 11: "Needle" (writer)
Traitors	1990	BBC Two	TV film. Dramatisation of the Gunpowder Plot (later revisited in Gunpowder, Treason & Plot) (writer)
El C.I.D.	1990–1991	ITV	Writer of 3 episodes: "A Proper Copper", "Christmas Spirit" and "Piece of Cake"
The Play on One	1991	BBC One	1 episode: "Gas and Candles" (writer)
Cracker	1993–1996, 2006	ITV	Creator, and writer of several episodes and 1 special (2006)
Priest	1994	-	Film, starring Linus Roache (writer)
Hearts and Minds	1995	Channel 4	Writer of all 4 episodes
Go Now	1995	BBC One	TV film, starring Robert Carlyle and Juliet Aubrey (co-writer)
Hillsborough	1996	ITV	TV film. Dramatised reconstruction of the events of the 1989 Hillsborough disaster (writer)
Fitz	1997	ABC / ITV	5 episodes (original teleplay)
The Lakes	1997–1999	BBC One	Creator, and writer of 10 episodes
Heart	1999	-	Film, starring Saskia Reeves and Christopher Eccleston (writer)
Dockers	1999	Channel 4	TV film. Dramatisation of the Liverpool dockers' strike (1995–98) (co-writer)
Liam	2000	-	Film, starring Ian Hart (writer)
Sunday	2002	Channel 4	TV film. Based on the events of Bloody Sunday (writer)
Gunpowder, Treason & Plot	2004	BBC One	TV mini-series. Dramatisation of the lives of Mary, Queen of Scots and James I of England (writer)
The Street	2006–2009	BBC One	Creator, and writer of 17 episodes
Moving On	2009–2021	BBC One	Creator, and writer of several episodes
Accused	2010–2012	BBC One	10 episodes (writer)
Common	2014	BBC One	TV film, set in the north west of England and based on the UK's controversial joint enterprise law (writer)
Banished	2015	BBC Two	TV mini-series. Creator, and writer of all 7 episodes
Defendant	2016	France 2	A French language remake of the British drama series Accused (creator)
Reg	2016	BBC One	TV film. Fact-based drama about the campaign by Reg Keys to obtain answers after the death of his son in the Iraq War (co-writer)
Broken	2017	BBC One	Writer/co-writer of all 6 episodes
Care	2018	BBC One	TV film, starring Sheridan Smith. Co-written with Gillian Juckes.
Anthony	2020	BBC One	TV film
Time	2021–2026	BBC One	TV series, starring a rotating cast. Writer of all nine episodes.
Unforgivable	2025	BBC Two	TV film

== Awards and honours ==
- Two Edgar Awards for Cracker.
- International Emmy for best drama series for The Street in 2010 and The Accused in 2011.
- Lifetime Achievement award from the Royal Television Society for his body of work.
- the Freedom of Liverpool on 8 December 2021, from Liverpool City Council, in recognition of his life's work.

=== BAFTAs ===
Year	Nominated work	Category	Co-nominees	Result	Ref.
1994	Cracker	Drama Series	Gub Neal	Nominated	
1995	—	Dennis Potter Award	—	Won	
1996	Go Now	Single Drama	Andrew Eaton, Paul Henry Powell, Michael Winterbottom	Nominated	
1997	Hillsborough	Single Drama	Katy Jones, Charles McDougall, Nicola Shindler	Won	
1998	The Lakes	Drama Serial	David Blair, Charles Pattinson	Nominated	
2000	Dockers	Single Drama	Bill Anderson, Sally Hibbin	Nominated	
2007	The Street	Drama Series	David Blair, Ken Horn, Sita Williams	Won	
2008	The Street	Television Craft	—	Nominated	
2008	The Street	Drama	John Chapman, Terry McDonough, Sita Williams	Won	
2010	The Street	Drama	David Blair, Roxy Spencer, Sita Williams	Nominated	
2013	Accused "(Tracie's Story)"	Writer Drama	Shaun Duggan	Nominated	
2013	Accused	Mini Series	Ashley Pearce, Roxy Spencer, Sita Williams	Nominated	
2015	Common	Single Drama	David Blair, Colin McKeown, Donna Molloy	Nominated	
