= Where Adam Stood =

- Written by: Dennis Potter
- Directed by: Brian Gibson
- Starring: Alan Badel; Max Harris; Heather Canning; Jean Boht; Gareth Forwood; Ronald Hines
- Composer: Carl Davis
- Country of origin: United Kingdom

Production
- Producer: Kenith Trodd
- Running time: 77 minutes

Original release
- Network: BBC Two
- Release: 21 April 1976

Where Adam Stood is a television play by Dennis Potter, first broadcast on BBC 2 in 1976. It is a free adaptation, wholly shot on film, of Edmund Gosse's autobiographical book Father and Son (1907).

== Synopsis ==
Philip Gosse, naturalist and Minister of the Plymouth Brethren, and his young son Edmund are in mourning for the recent death of Mrs Gosse; the household held together by religious piety and strict bible study. Despite the claustrophobic environment, Edmund experiences brief moments of joy when his father allows him to view the exotic flora and fauna he keeps in his aquarium as part of his studies. Edmund, however, is troubled by nightmares of a Christ-like figure on a beach beckoning towards him. Confiding in his father about these terrible dreams, he reveals that his recent prayers have been to ask God for a toy sailing boat he has seen for sale in the window of a village shop. Gosse forces Edmund to pray and manipulates him into saying that God will not grant him his wish on the grounds that it is distracting him from spiritual matters.

One day the house receives a guest in the form of Mr Brackley: a naturalist visiting Mr Gosse on behalf of Charles Darwin. Darwin is about to publish his seminal work and, aware of Gosse's reputation in the field of natural science, asks for his support in the face of a potential outcry against the Royal Society. Gosse rejects Darwin's theories on the grounds that they cannot be reconciled with his religious beliefs and politely asks Brackley to leave. Despite his conviction that the story of Genesis is literally true, the encounter leads Gosse into questioning his faith; his own studies into marine biology demonstrate that species are not immutable, yet he is troubled at the thought that this challenges the validity of Creation given in the bible. He spends the rest of the evening ruminating on the problem.

The next day, Edmund and the Gosses' housekeeper Miss Marks are in the village running an errand when Edmund sees the toy sailboat in the shop window. When Miss Marks' back is turned Edmund is confronted by Mary Teague, the village 'mad woman', who takes him into the woods and sexually assaults him. Edmund manages to get away by hitting her in the face with a stone and rejoins Miss Marks, who is angry that Edmund left her. They hurry back to the house as Gosse is expecting an important visitor that afternoon, Charles Kingsley, with whom he wishes to discuss a book he intends to write reconciling the biblical story with Darwin's findings.

Later that evening, as the two men are talking, Edmund has a coughing fit. Kingsley is surprised at Gosse's lack of concern for his son, and is especially taken back when Gosse sends Edmund up to bed with no supper for failing to memorise a bible passage. As Edmund prepares for bed, Gosse tells him that he is sorry that Edmund is feeling unwell and attempts to reassure him by telling him he "will soon join [his] mother." Although frightened by his father's words, Edmund attempts to get some sleep. Meanwhile, Gosse and Kingsley resume their discussion. Gosse explains to Kingsley that Darwin is incorrect in assuming that the earth is much older than it appears, and that the species upon it have adapted to suit their environment over time. He uses the example of Adam's navel as a means of reconciling Darwin's studies with scripture. Gosse reasons that if Adam was intended to be the model of humanity he would have a navel despite having no mother; if this is the case then Genesis is merely a "cutting in" to Creation, and God has specifically designed every life form upon the earth, including man himself, to appear as though a continuing cycle of change and adaptation has taken place. Suddenly a cry is heard from upstairs – Edmund is having another bad dream. Gosse goes up to see him and Edmund admits that he has been thinking about the toy sailboat again. Gosse insists that they both pray to God to settle the matter one last time. He turns to face Edmund and asks what God's judgement is; Edmund tells his father that God says he is to have the sailboat. Gosse, confused and troubled by this revelation, leaves Edmund's bedroom. After he exits, Edmund places a chair against the door and returns to sleep. The play concludes with a voice-over taken from Mr Brackley's earlier meeting with Gosse:

Any creature, any life form that can, by however small a degree, adapt to the harshness of its environment is the one that is going to persist. Extinction awaits those creatures which cannot rise to meet the challenges of their own environment. The fit survive, the unfit perish.

=== Principal cast ===
- Alan Badel as Philip Gosse
- Max Harris as Edmund Gosse
- Heather Canning as Miss Marks
- Gareth Forwood as Mr Brackley
- Jean Boht as Mary Teague
- Ronald Hines as Charles Kingsley

== Production ==
As with Potter's 1971 serial about the life of Giacomo Casanova, Where Adam Stood is a loose adaptation of original source material set within a fictional framework. In Potter on Potter, the author told editor Graham Fuller that he used only a few pages of Father and Son as his starting point, and rejected the resultant play's status as a straight adaptation. Instead, Potter saw the play as part of a loose trilogy exploring an individual's choices (or rather, lack of them) in the face of seemingly omniscient forces; Where Adam Stood was to form the last part, preceded by Double Dare and Brimstone and Treacle, respectively (both 1976). The BBC's decision not to broadcast Brimstone effectively ended this idea, although Potter would continue to refer to the three as a connected trilogy in interviews and critical essays. Potter would also later tell Fuller that he considered Where Adam Stood to be amongst the "most satisfying" of his plays.

Where Adam Stood, however, was written at a very difficult time for Potter. In 1974, his father died and this, coupled with a severe bout of psoriatic arthropathy, led to Potter developing writer's block. Double Dare was a reflection on the problems he was having writing, while Brimstone was written in response to the ravages of his debilitating illness; Where Adam Stood was Potter's reflection on the communication problems he faced in his relationship with his father.

== Themes ==
Where Adam Stood contains none of the non-naturalistic flourishes that have become synonymous with Potter's work, although it does contain a number of familiar tropes he would explore in other pieces. The fall is represented by Mary Teague's sexual attack on the young Edmund in the woods, which Potter later described as a "physical acknowledgement" that the world is not as innocent or good as Edmund had previously been led to believe. This sequence, which does not feature in Gosse's original book, is one of many that ties into the central theme of Edmund reclaiming himself from his father, who acts as the mouthpiece for an omniscient and unseen God. The boy's final act of using his prayers to deceive his father into allowing him to have the toy sailboat was, Potter explained, "a form of betrayal" and one that was "deeply rooted in [Philip Gosse's] religious language [...] He has observed the boy praying, but because his own faith has been tested he no longer knows what God expects of him anymore."

== Historical background ==
The drama includes a number of episodes derived from scenes described in Edmund Gosse's book. The nearest parallel to the story of the sailing boat is Gosse's description of his childhood prayer to have a "humming top", for which his parents told him it was inappropriate to pray. He replied that his father had "said we ought to pray for things we needed, and I needed a humming top a great deal more more than I did the conversion of the heathen or the restitution of Jerusalem to the Jews, two objects of my nightly supplication which left me very cold." An episode in which a visitor is surprised to learn that young Edmund has never heard of Robin Hood is derived from a passage in which he states that his mother banned all fictional stories from the house on the grounds that fiction was a form of lies. He writes "I was familiar with humming-birds but had never heard of fairies. Jack the Giant Killer, Rumpelstiltskin and Robin Hood were not of my acquaintance".

Edmund's description of his father's studies towards the publication of Omphalos place it in the context of the debates about Charles Lyell's geology, which emphasised that the earth was millions of years old, and recent work by various naturalists including Thomas Vernon Wollaston, Joseph Dalton Hooker and Alfred Russel Wallace. In the play, only Darwin's as-yet unpublished work is mentioned. Philip Gosse is visited to secure his support for it. This incident derives from the following passage in Father and Son:

In this period of intellectual ferment, as when a great political revolution is being planned, many possible adherents were confidentially tested with hints and encouraged to reveal their bias in a whisper. It was the notion of Lyell, himself a great mover of men, that before the doctrine of natural selection was given to a world which would be sure to lift up at it a howl of execration, a certain body-guard of sound and experienced naturalists, expert in the description of species, should be privately made aware of its tenour. Among those who were thus initiated, or approached with a view towards possible illumination, was my Father. He was spoken to by Hooker, and later on by Darwin, after meetings of the Royal Society in the summer of 1857.

However Edmund makes it clear that Lyell's geology was the object of his father's hatred, not Darwin himself, for whom he had "a profound esteem". In fact Darwin is never criticised in Omphalos, which is subtitled "an attempt to untie the geological knot". He is mentioned approvingly in passing twice, and Darwin's tutor Adam Sedgwick is described as "one of our most able and eloquent geologists". Sedgwick was an old earth creationist who believed that God had miraculously created and then caused the extinction of separate immutable species in sequence over millions of years as a sign of his power. Evolutionary theory is only briefly mentioned when the 1844 evolutionary tract Vestiges of the Natural History of Creation is dismissed because "this writer has hatched a scheme by which the immediate ancestor of Adam was a Chimpanzee and his remote ancestor a Maggot!".

The role of Charles Kingsley in the drama derives from a letter he wrote to Gosse senior, cited by Edmund, in which he stated:

Shall I tell you the truth? It is best. Your book is the first that ever made me doubt, and I fear it will make hundreds do so. Your book tends to prove this – that if we accept the fact of absolute creation, God becomes Deus quidam deceptor ['God who is sometimes a deceiver']. I do not mean merely in the case of fossils which pretend to be the bones of dead animals; but in the one single case of your newly created scars on the pandanus trunk, your newly created Adam's navel, you make God tell a lie. It is not my reason, but my conscience which revolts here ... I cannot ... believe that God has written on the rocks one enormous and superfluous lie for all mankind.

In the play, the use of the expression "survival of the fittest" is attributed to Darwin; in reality it was first coined by Herbert Spencer in his Principals of Biology (1864).

== Intertextuality ==
Although Where Adam Stood is set on the Devonshire coast, the townsfolk appear to speak with Potter's native Forest of Dean dialect; this is used many times in Potter's original works.

'Mary Teague' appears, in name if not in person, in several Potter plays. In A Beast With Two Backs (1968) she is a miner's wife, whose husband's infidelity drives the play's narrative. She is also referred to in Cream in My Coffee (1980), when the curmudgeonly Bernard Wilsher (played by Lionel Jeffries) reminisces about a 'Mrs Teague' who used to live in his village; describing her as a "mad old woman with a cat".

The biblical passage Edmund attempts to memorise throughout the course of the play is the Epistle of St Paul to the Philippians. Potter had previously used this passage as the centrepiece to his 1972 drama Follow the Yellow Brick Road.

== Broadcast ==
The play was broadcast on BBC 2 on 21 April 1976. It was not repeated until 2005 as part of BBC Four's Potter season, marking the tenth anniversary of his death.

A request for a much earlier repeat had come from an unexpected source. Potter's critic, morality campaigner Mary Whitehouse, greatly enjoyed the play and had requested a repeat on BBC 1 shortly after the original transmission. She wrote privately to Potter and the BBC conveying her appreciation.

== Sources ==
- Humphrey Carpenter, Dennis Potter: A Biography; 1998
- Graham Fuller (Ed.), Potter on Potter; 1993
- W. Stephen Gilbert, Fight and Kick and Bite: The Life and Work of Dennis Potter; 1995
- Nigel Williams (Ed.) Arena: Potter at the BBC; 2005
