= Aquarist =

Person who manages aquariums

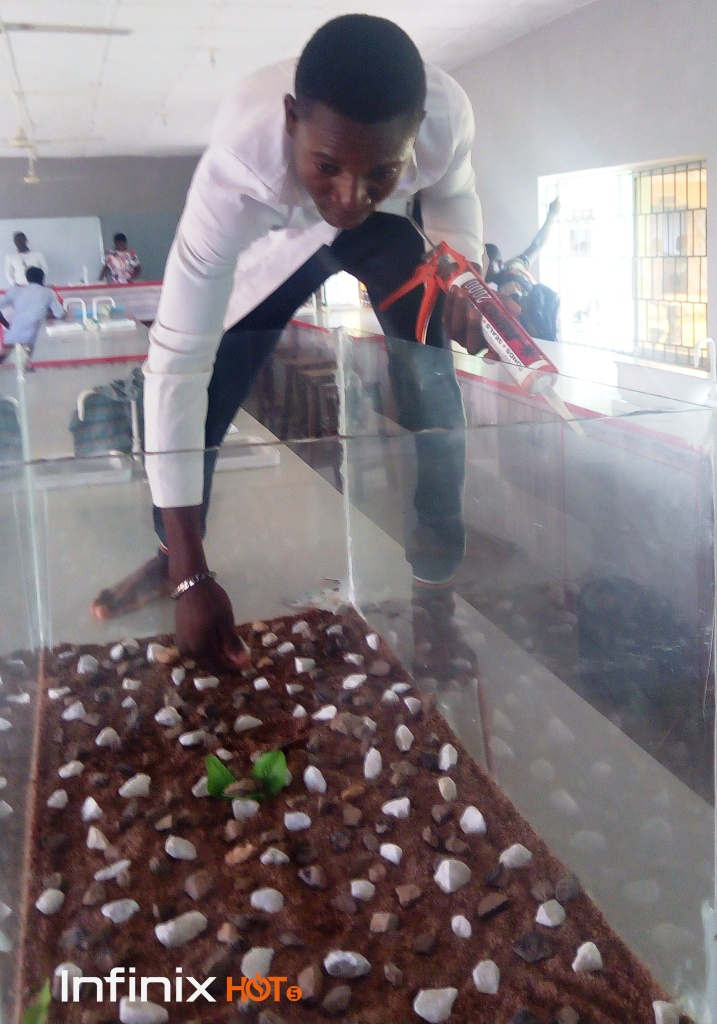
An aquarist in the process of designing a tank for educational purposes.

An aquarist is a person who manages aquariums, either professionally or as a hobby. They typically care for aquatic animals, including fish and marine invertebrates. Some may care for aquatic mammals. Aquarists often work at public aquariums. They may also work at nature reserves, zoos, and amusement parks. Some aquarists conduct field research outdoors. In business, aquarists may work at pet stores, as commercial fish breeders, or as manufacturers. Some aquarists are hobbyists, also known as "home aquarists," who may vary in skills and experience.

== History ==
People have cared for aquatic animals since ancient times. The Sumerians kept fish in ponds as early as 2500 BCE. Pliny the Elder wrote of people who kept fish as oracles, and ancient Agrigent was believed to have fish ponds. The Roman poet Rutilus Namatianus wrote of a Etrurian Jew who kept fish in opaque tanks. By the 10th century, goldfish were popular pets in China. In 1369, Emperor Hung Wu established a porcelain factory to produce large tubs for fish. Around 1500, goldfish came to Sakai, Japan. Two hundred years later, Sato Sanzaemon from Koriyama became the first Japanese fish breeder, and fish breeding became popular throughout Japan. Around 1611, goldfish came to Europe, probably first in Portugal. By the 18th century, goldfish were common pets in Europe. During this time, Richard Bradley, an English botanist, and John Dayell, a Scottish naturalist, experimented with keeping marine life. In particular, scientists tried to determine if marine life could survive in captivity, as they usually died shortly after being removed from their natural environments.

For centuries, humans had limited exposure to aquatic life. The sea was often considered mysterious. As written by Bernd Brunner in The Ocean at home, "The ocean was considered a source of life but also a place of ill omen, death, and mayhem—a cursed, dark world where terrifying monsters lurked, devouring anything in sight." Yet, in the 19th century, railroad transportation was introduced, enabling more people to visit coastal regions. During this period, scientists focused on analyzing the chemical and physical properties of aquatic environments, such as water temperature and salt content. Ocean exploration also became more common, as telegraph cables were installed underwater, diving bells and early submarines were invented, and deep sea explorations began with the help of dredgers. One of the most famous oceanic expeditions of the period was the four year journey of HMS Challenger, led by Sir Charles Wyville Thomson, which visited 363 locations.

In 1830, Jeanne Villepreux-Power conducted research on argonauts in Messina, Italy. According to Richard Owen, director of the British Museum, Villepreux-Power invented the first aquarium through these experiments. That same year, Nathaniel Bagshaw Ward discovered that delicate plants could grow in airtight glass, as the glass created a microclimate. Around 1838, Felix Dujardin, a French zoologist, owned a saltwater aquarium. In 1846, Anna Thyne moved stone corals from Torquay to her home in London, later keeping them in her home in glass bowls. She experimented with water changes to sustain the corals, and she was able to keep the corals alive for three years. In 1849, Robert Warrington created a 13-gallon tank with springwater and goldfish. He published his findings related to oxygen and lighting in Chemical Society's Journal. In 1854, The Aquarium, by Philip Henry Gosse, was published, which was a commercial success and inspired middle-class families to create aquariums. The book provided information on how to build aquariums with aquatic plants, fish, hermit crabs, shrimp, sea anemone, aphrodita, and other aquatic life. During this period, William Alford Lloyd sold aquariums at his shop in London, which also provided aquarium maintenance services to customers. In 1856, Emil Adolf Rossmässler wrote about setting up freshwater aquariums as a "small botanical garden island" with animals such as snails, pearl mussels, and goldfish in Die Gartenlaube. These freshwater aquariums were appealing for people who lived farther from the sea.

Illustration of a home aquarium from 1879.

While the "aquarium mania" of the 1850s lost popularity after a few years, public aquariums were soon established. In 1853, the "fish house" was opened at the London Zoo. In 1860, Gustav Jager, a German nature scientist and doctor, built an aquarium in Vienna, Austria. Major cities continued to open aquariums in the late 19th and early 20th centuries, such as the New York Aquarium (1896) and Belle Isle Aquarium in Detroit (1904). Early aquariums cared little for conservation of endangered species, and they often contributed to marine degradation. However, conservation efforts began in the 20th century, such as the conservation of the Galápagos tortoises led by Charles Haskins Townsend. Contemporary aquariums are now often involved in conservation and field research. In 2019, The Atlantic reported that "the United States is experiencing a new wave of aquarium enthusiasm," but that public aquariums often experience financial difficulty.

== Responsibilities ==
Responsibilities for aquarists often include maintaining and cleaning tanks, preparing food for the animals (including dietary adjustments), feeding the animals, providing mental stimulation for some animals, monitoring animals for sickness or injuries, administering medication and vitamins to animals, maintaining the water quality and water temperature of tanks, maintaining the lighting of tanks, collecting data on the water quality and water temperature of tanks, monitoring and maintaining aquarium machinery (such as filters, heaters, and pumps), transporting animals, and building exhibits, among other duties. It is common for aquarists to have scuba diving certification.
