= Omphalos (story) =

2019 short story by Ted Chiang

- Short story by Ted Chiang
- Country: United States
- Language: English
- Genre: Science fiction

Publication
- Published in: Exhalation: Stories
- Publication type: Anthology
- Media type: Hardcover, paperback
- Publication date: May 2019

"Omphalos" is a science fantasy short story by American author Ted Chiang. It is named after the Omphalos hypothesis and an 1857 book by English naturalist Philip Henry Gosse. It was first published in Chiang's 2019 collection, Exhalation: Stories.

== Plot ==
The story is told through the prayers and letters of pious archaeologist Dr. Dorothea Morrel and takes place in an alternate 20th century, where young Earth creationism and the concept of absolute space are fundamentally true.

Dorothea travels from an archaeological dig in Arisona to give a public lecture on Chicagou, (Note: A few real places in the story are spelled differently.) where she explains how dendrochronology has determined the world to be 8,912 years old as well as indicating that the first trees were created fully grown, as they have a ringless core. The museum's latest exhibit includes Atacaman mummies belonging to the first generation of humans—created as adults by God and thus lacking navels. Believing that primordial beings with apparent signs of growth would have been tantamount to deception, Dorothea is passionate that God intended humans to understand Him through science.

From a meeting with her cousin, Dorothea believes that an illegal sale of museum relics is taking place. The clues lead her to a post office in San Francisco, where, to her surprise, the thief is revealed to be a teen, Wilhelmina McCullough. She is the daughter of Dr. Nathan McCullough, director of the University of Alta California. Wilhelmina explains that she did not steal out of personal gain but to strengthen people's faith before her father's recent discovery is made public.

Dr. McCullough reveals to Dorothea that he reviewed a scientific paper by an astronomer who challenges the consensus that the Sun is the only star at absolute rest. Not only does his research indicate that the Solar System moves like any other star, but that in defiance of celestial mechanics, the star 58 Eridani circles a seemingly empty spot every 24 hours, and its center is at absolute rest relative to the luminiferous aether. He reasons that God is miraculously sustaining a geocentric star system around a truly unmoving planet whose inhabitants constitute His true reason for creating the universe. This could mean that humanity is simply a test or an unintended side effect, that humanity is not part of a divine plan, and that suffering (including Dr. McCullough's son's death) is meaningless.

Disturbed, Dorothea tells her cousin that she is taking a leave now that she finds her job meaningless. Weeks later, however, Dorothea plans to resume her work, realizing that doing science for its own sake is just as fulfilling—regardless of God's plan.

== Reception ==
"Omphalos" won the Locus Award for Best Novelette in 2020. It was also a finalist for the 2020 Hugo Award for Best Novelette and the Theodore Sturgeon Award.

The Nation considered the basic premise—a creationist archaeologist in conflict with a creationist astronomer—to be "hilarious", but noted that the story is not a humorous work, and emphasized that Dorothea is an empiricist who uses the scientific method.

In The Washington Post, Paul Di Filippo called the story "masterful and striking" and found it evocative of Philip Jose Farmer's "Sail On! Sail On!".
