= Brook Street Chapel =

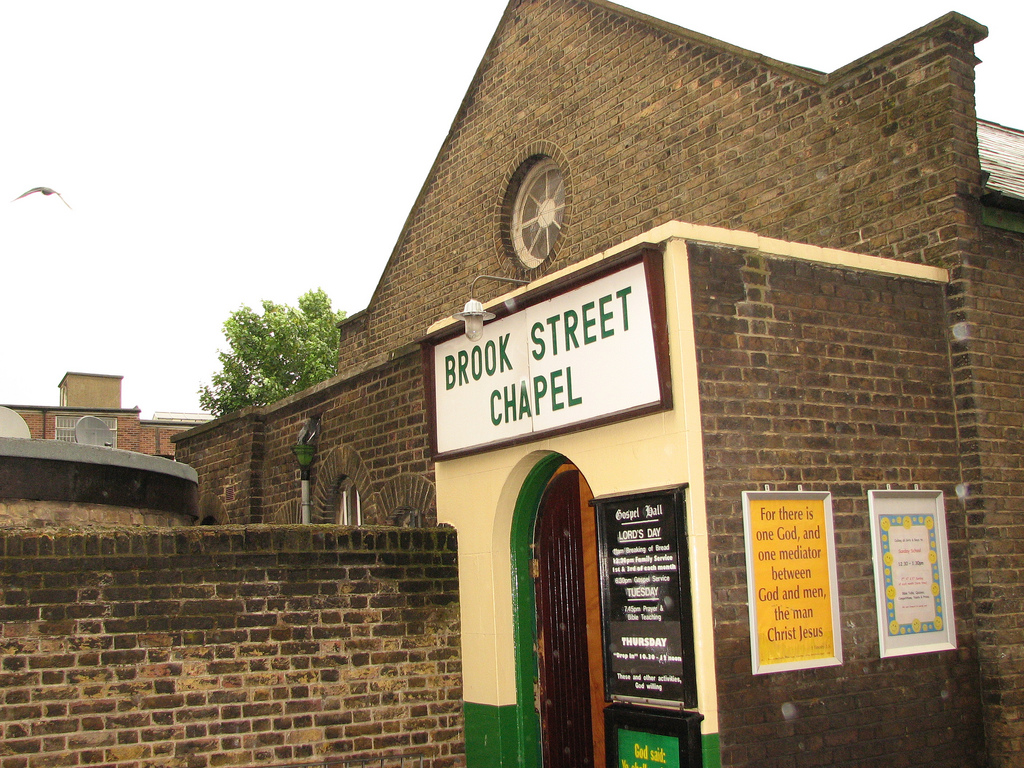
- Brook Street Chapel, Tottenham

- Location within Greater London
- 51.5931931°N 0.0690588°W
- Location: Brook Street, High Road, Tottenham, London N17 9JG
- Country: England
- Denomination: Open Brethren
- Website: [www.brookstreetchapel.co.uk]

History
- Founded: 1839
- Founder(s): Robert and John Eliot Howard

Brook Street Chapel is a church building in Tottenham, North London. The building was constructed for use as a meeting place for local Christians affiliated with the Plymouth Brethren movement.

== History ==
A group of around eight individuals who had seceded from the Quakers met in the house of a Mrs Sands in Stoney South (now Stoneleigh Road) from 1838, and the Brooks Street Meeting House was constructed and opened in 1839. Prominent amongst the original members were the chemist John Eliot Howard and his brother Robert, and some funding was also provided by their father, the meteorologist Luke Howard, who moved to Tottenham shortly after. The Howards are commemorated in Tottenham by a blue plaque to Luke at 7, Bruce Grove, and a green plaque to John on the site of his home, Lord's Meade (now Lordship Lane).

As the population of Tottenham grew throughout the nineteenth century, the assembly of Christians also grew rapidly to around 88 by 1842 and around 140 in 1851. Work with local children was a major concern, with a Sunday School of an estimated 600 children at the turn of the twentieth century. The Meeting House, now known as Brook Street Chapel was given over entirely for children's work, and all other assembly meetings were held between 1880 and 1903 in lecture rooms on the opposite side of the High Road.

The Chapel building was extended in 1939 and again in 1955 to include a schoolroom and a rear hall for youth work. The building in its present state occupies the whole of Brook Street, after World War II bombing destroyed the houses in the further part of the road.

=== The Tottenham Memorandum ===
Displayed in the Chapel is the Tottenham Memorandum, which was produced at the time of the division of the movement into open and exclusive factions – the Memorandum shows that Brook Street Chapel remained 'open', receiving any Christians into fellowship who were born-again believers in Jesus Christ, providing their confession of faith could be demonstrated.

== Individuals associated with the assembly ==
Apart from the Howards, other notable members of the assembly included James Von Summer, founder of the Echoes of Service magazine and Edmund Gosse, who taught in the Sunday School. Christians who taught or visited include John Nelson Darby, Anthony Norris Groves, George Müller, James Hudson Taylor, Thomas Barnardo, Philip Gosse (Edmund's father, and a noted naturalist) and his wife Emily Bowes, who were married at the chapel in 1848.

== Geography ==
The chapel was built when Tottenham was a wealthy suburb of London and, like the Plough public house next to it, was set back from Tottenham High Road. Since then, the double front of the chapel has been partially obscured by new buildings (now housing Ladbrokes bookmakers), so that the building appears hidden from the High Road (now the A10), giving it the nickname of "the hidden church".

The land to the south of the chapel was originally the Chapel's burial ground. When it was no longer usable, the land was committed to the London County Council to be kept in perpetuity as an open, public space – it is now a children's playground and paved area.
