= Anna Savage =

Anna Savage may refer to:

- Anna Blake (Hollyoaks), a character from the TV series Hollyoaks
- Anna Shipton (née Savage; 1815–1901), Christian writer
- Anna Savage (born Anna Chase Rich; died 1883), first wife of Ezra P. Savage
- Anna B Savage, English singer-songwriter

== See also ==
- Anne Savage (disambiguation)
