= Luke Howard (meteorologist) =

British manufacturing chemist (1772–1864)

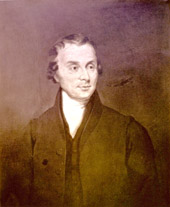
- Portrait by John Opie
- Born: 28 November 1772; London, England
- Died: 21 March 1864 (aged 91); London, England
- Citizenship: United Kingdom
- Known for: Cloud nomenclature
- Scientific career
- Fields: Meteorology, chemistry, pharmaceuticals

Luke Howard FRS (28 November 1772 – 21 March 1864) was a British manufacturing chemist and an amateur meteorologist with broad interests in science. His lasting contribution to science is a nomenclature system for clouds, which he proposed in an 1802 presentation to the Askesian Society. Because of this, Howard is referred to as "The Godfather of Clouds", the "namer of the clouds", and the "father of meteorology".

== Personal life ==
Luke Howard was born on 28 November 1772 in London to tin-plate manufacturer Robert Howard (1738–1812) and Elizabeth née Leatham (1742–1816). Howard attended a Quaker grammar school in Burford, Oxfordshire where the headteacher was renowned for his flogging of slow-to-learn pupils. In 1796 Howard married Mariabella Eliot. He and his wife had four daughters and three sons, of whom Robert Howard and John Eliot Howard were ultimately to take over their father's chemical manufacturing business, Howards and Sons. Their daughter Elizabeth married John Hodgkin, a barrister.

Although a Quaker, he quit the Society in 1825 after a dispute concerning apocryphal texts. A larger rift in the Society, the members being known as Beaconites being followers of Isaac Crewdson's A Beacon to the Society of Friends, led to Howard's final resignation from the Society in 1836. Howard was subsequently baptized into the Plymouth Brethren in 1837 by Crewdson.

Howard died on 21 March 1864 at 7 Bruce Grove, Tottenham and is buried at Winchmore Hill Quaker Burial Ground in Enfield, north London.

== Career ==
Luke Howard became a pharmacist by profession. After serving an apprenticeship with a pharmacist in Stockport, Cheshire, he worked at a druggist's in Bishopsgate before setting up his own pharmacy in Fleet Street. In 1798, he began a partnership with fellow Quaker William Allen to form the pharmaceutical company of Allen and Howard. Howard operated the partnership's factory built on the marshes at Plaistow, to the east of London. The partnership was ended in 1807 and Howard relocated his operations to Stratford East London. This factory soon became the successful industrial chemicals and pharmaceuticals company later, 1856, known as Howards and Sons.

Howard was elected a Fellow of the Royal Society in 1821. In July 1838, Howard became an honorary member of the Société française de statistique universelle, the society founded by M Cesar Moreau (French Consul to London), of which the Royal Society was a member. Howard spent the years 1824 to 1852 in Ackworth, Yorkshire.

== Scientific work ==
=== Background ===
Luke Howard has been called "the father of meteorology" for his comprehensive recordings of weather in the London area from 1801 to 1841 and his writings, which transformed the science of meteorology. Howard had an earlier interest in botany, presenting a paper "Account of a Microscopical Investigation of several Species of Pollen, ..." that was published in the Linnaean Society's Transactions for 1802, but wrote to Goethe that his passion was for meteorology.

=== Howard's On the modification of clouds ===
In his late twenties, Luke Howard wrote the Essay on the Modification of Clouds, which was published in 1803. Howard's system was similar to the recently popularized Linnaean classification system developed by taxonomist Carl von Linne. Howard named the three principal categories of clouds – cumulus, stratus, and cirrus, as well as a series of intermediate and compound modifications, such as cirrostratus and cirrocumulus, in order to accommodate the transitions occurring between the forms. Howard's classification system applied the recently popularized Linnean principles of natural history classification. By applying these principles to phenomena as short-lived as clouds, Howard arrived at an elegant solution to the problem of naming transitional forms in nature.

In his 1803 Essay, Howard included detailed cloud drawings to supplement the written descriptions of his classifications. The drawings of clouds were Howard's own, taken from the rigorous notes and watercolor sketches in Howard's sketchbook. However, the landscapes were done by painter Edward Kennion, as Howard had no formal artistic training. The engravings done by Thomas Milton for the publishing of Howard's essay slightly altered the depictions of the clouds.

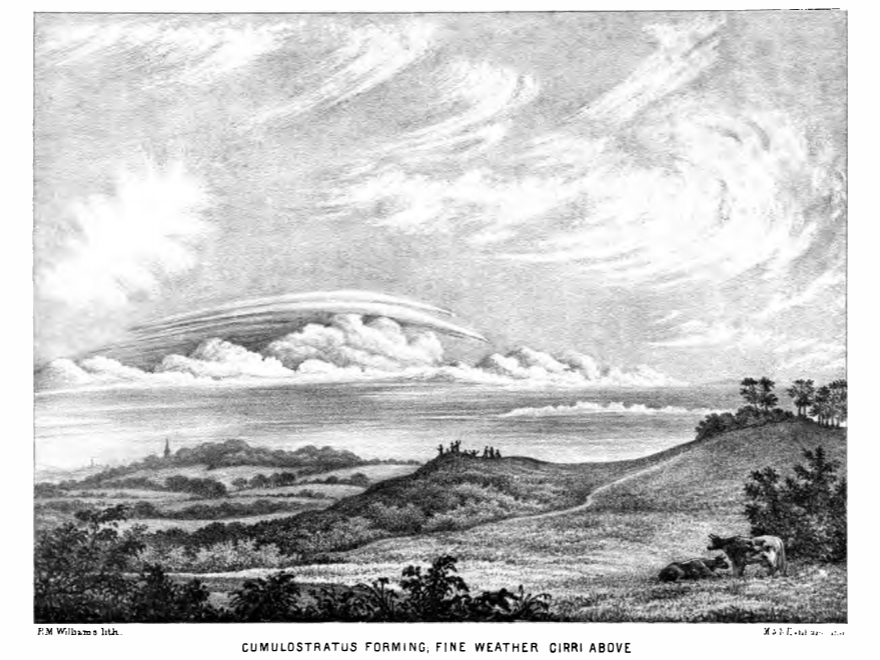
A depiction of a cumulostratus cloud, included in Howard's 'On the modification of clouds'

Howard also emphasized the importance of clouds in meteorology:

"Clouds are subject to certain distinct modifications, produced by the general causes which affect all the variations of the atmosphere; they are commonly as good visible indicators of the operation of these causes, as is the countenance of the state of a person's mind or body".

Howard strongly believed that "cloud formation and destruction were visible signs of atmospheric processes and were based on the laws of physics". Howard referred to cloud formation as "nubification", a term that was never popularized. Howard had the same elementary knowledge of cloud physics as many other researchers at the time, including his close friend and chemist John Dalton. Some of this knowledge was generally correct, like Howard and Dalton's belief that clouds were formations of water particles, that the slow speed of the particles' descension was due to air resistance, and that they evaporated right below the cloud base. Howard, however, held some incorrect beliefs about cloud physics. Primarily Howard gave electricity too large a role in the formation of clouds. The knowledge Howard had about cloud physics partially formed his motives for creating a classification system.

=== Other cloud classification systems ===
Howard was not the first to attempt a classification of clouds—biologist Jean-Baptiste Lamarck (1744–1829) proposed a list of descriptive terms in French the same year that Howard presented his essay, containing five terms, four of which overlapped with Howard's system. The two were not known to have any contact, Lamarck working independently in France, and Howard working independently in England. Despite being presented in the same year, Howard's system gained popularity quickly and became far more widespread than Lamarck's. Howard's system's success has been said to be due to Howard's use of universal Latin, the Linnaean classification system, and his emphasis on the mutability of clouds. Lamarck's system, however, used French terms and opted for descriptive terms as opposed to a classification system like Linnaeus'. Lamarck's essay proposing his system contained no pictures and was published in an obscure academic journal. Additionally, Napoleon publicly denounced Lamarck's meteorological work, and Lamarck's system was never well known within his own country.

=== Later meteorological work ===
In addition to his seminal work on clouds, Howard contributed numerous papers on other meteorological topics. He was also a pioneer in urban climate studies, publishing the earliest scientific book on urban climatology, The Climate of London in 1818–20, a 700-page book including continuous daily observations of wind direction, atmospheric pressure, maximum temperature, and rainfall; it also demolished James Hutton's theory of rain, though without suggesting a definitive alternative. In it, Howard was first to note the urban heat island effect, showing that temperatures in London, compared to those simultaneously measured in the surrounding countryside, were 3.7 °F (2.1 °C) warmer at night, and cooler during the day, and to attribute the concentration of smog (which he called 'city fog') to this phenomenon. For Rees's Cyclopædia he contributed articles on meteorology, but the titles are not known.

Luke Howard also published the first textbook in meteorology in 1837, Seven Lectures in Meteorology. In the fifth lecture, Howard included the same classification scheme he proposed in 1802, slightly changing his descriptions. Howard notes again the importance of cloud studies for meteorology in the introduction of his work, claiming clouds to be "the subjects of grave theory and practical research...shewn to be governed, in their production, suspension, and destruction, by... fixed Laws".

== Legacy ==
Howard's classification of clouds was later adopted by Ralph Abercromby and Hugo Hildebrand Hildebrandsson, who further developed and popularised the system laid out by Howard. Abercromby noted in a paper on the naming of clouds that to the Quaker Howard "any name connected with heathen mythology was specially distasteful". Howard's cloud classification had a major influence on the arts as well as on science. His original essay, On the Modification of Clouds, was translated into German and French in 1815. This allowed German writer and scholar Goethe to access the text. Goethe was entranced by Howard's system, and he later wrote a series of poems in gratitude to him, including the lines (note: English translation):

But Howard gives us with his clear mind
The gain of lessons new to all mankind;
That which no hand can reach, no hand can clasp
He first has gained, first held with mental grasp.

Goethe also wrote to Howard (via one of Goethe's English friends), requesting Howard's autobiography and process in developing his classification system. Goethe also attempted to commission German painter Caspar David Friedrich for cloud studies based on Howard's system, but Friedrich declined. However, Friedrich did begin a series of cloud studies later that year. Howard's classification system, along with Goethe's interest, resulted in a great artistic interest in clouds. Howard's work is also rumored to have inspired Shelley's poem "The Cloud" and informed John Constable's paintings and studies of skies, in addition to the writings and art of John Ruskin, who used Howard's cloud classification in his criticisms of landscape paintings in Modern Painters.

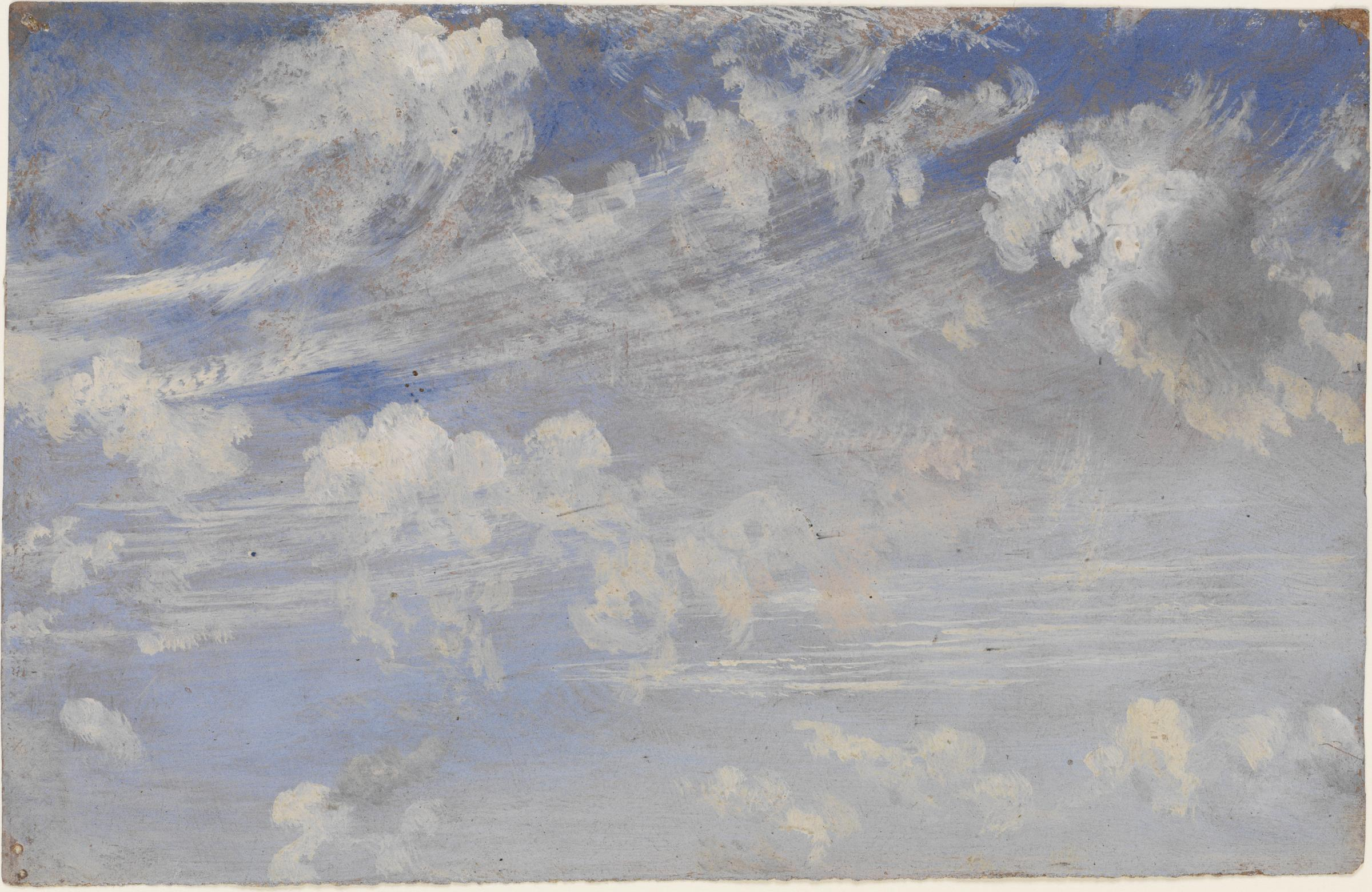
John Constable's "Study of Cirrus Clouds"

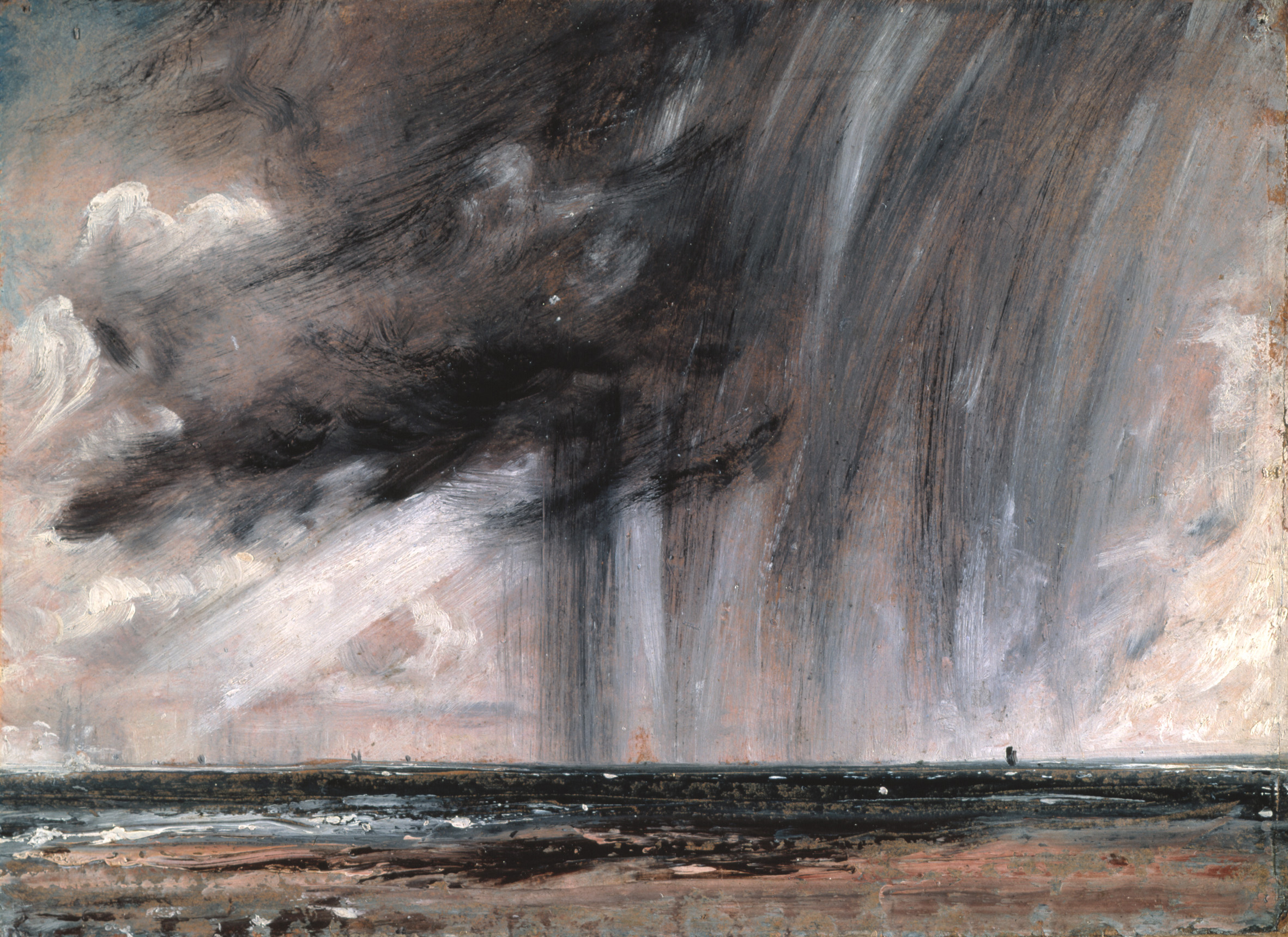
John Constable's "Seascape Study with Rain Cloud"

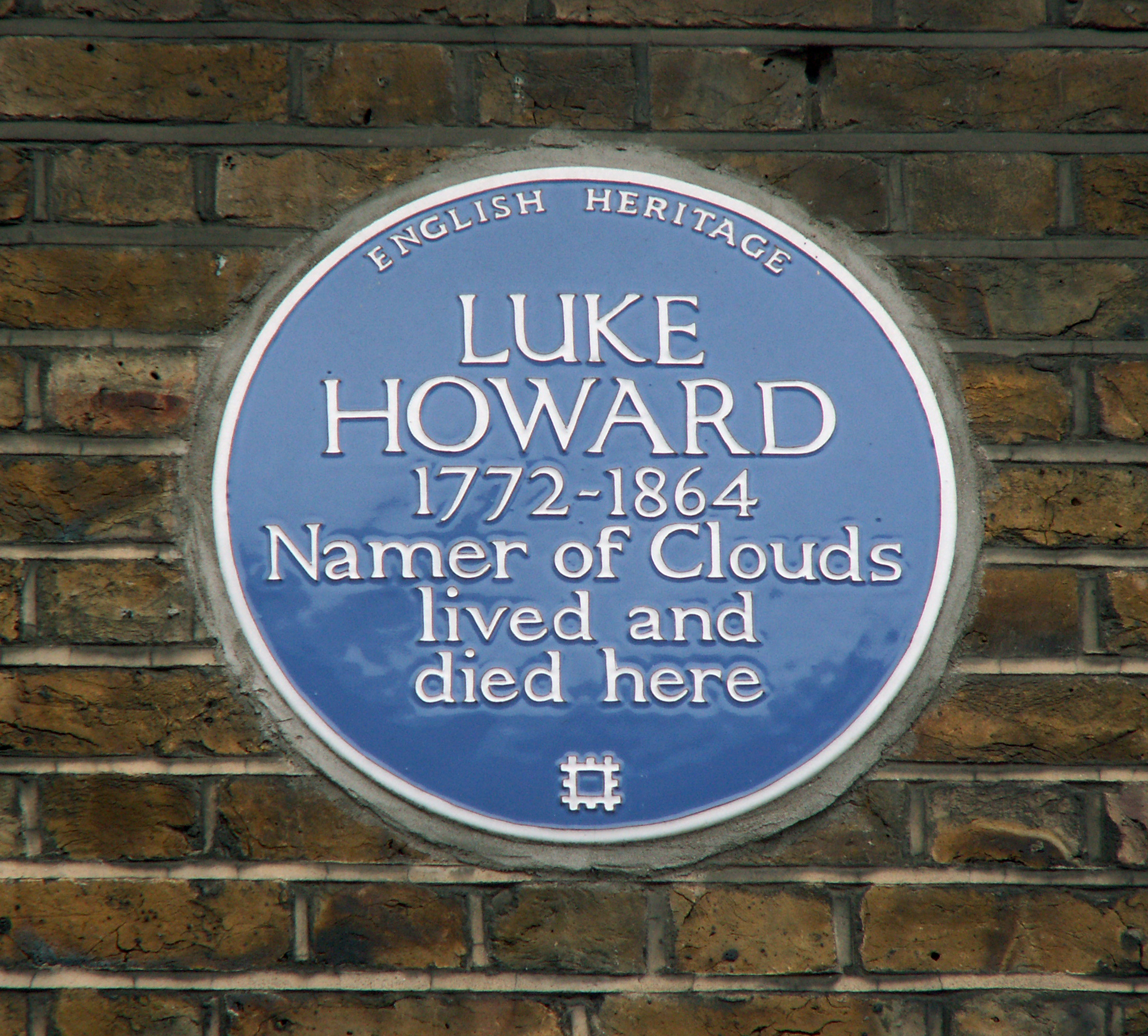
English Heritage Blue plaque – 7 Bruce Grove, Tottenham, London

Howard appears in a novel by French writer Stéphane Audeguy titled, La théorie des nuages, winner of the 2005 Prix de l'Académie. Published in the US in 2007 as The Theory of Clouds. Luke Howard is also the main character in the historic novel Le Dernier Nuage written by French author Frédéric Chignac (published in 2025 by Hervé Chopin Editions).

An English Heritage blue plaque dedicated to Howard at 7 Bruce Grove, Tottenham (the house in which he died, aged 91), states simply his fame as "Namer of Clouds". Howard was actively involved in the development of a Tottenham religious meeting house with his son, John Eliot Howard. Originally known as Brook Street Meeting House, it is now the Brook Street Chapel found on Tottenham High Road.

Whilst Howard's factory was located in Plaistow, he resided at The River House, 3, Blaker Road, Stratford. Howard's observations of the changing skyscape as he travelled between his home and factory facilitated his recording and categorization of clouds and his other observations of nature. Town Planning consent for this property's redevelopment was submitted in 2015.

His daughter Rachel founded a school in Ackworth, West Yorkshire, which also contains a Plymouth Brethren burial ground.

In 2018, Tottenham Hotspur FC club, located near his house in Bruce Grove, named viewing areas in honour of his cloud names at the top of its east and west stands of its new stadium. These, with panoramic views of the pitch and across London, were named 'Stratus East' and 'Stratus West' in recognition of Howard's classifications of cloud formations.

In 2024, The Royal Mail released a stamp honouring Howard.

== Sources ==
- Hamblyn, Richard (2011). The Invention of Clouds. London: Picador. ISBN 978-0-330-53730-8.
- Thornes, John.E. (1999). John Constable's Skies. The University of Birmingham Press. ISBN 1-902459-02-4.
- Oxford Dictionary of National Biography
- HOWARDS AND SONS LIMITED {CHEMISTS} Collection of Papers at the London Metropolitan Archives https://search.lma.gov.uk/scripts/mwimain.dll/144/LMA_OPAC/web_detail/REFD+ACC~2F1037?SESSIONSEARCH
