= Father and Son (Gosse book) =

1907 book by Edmund Gosse

- Author: Edmund Gosse
- Language: English
- Genre: memoir
- Set in: London and Devon, 1848–70
- Publisher: Heinemann
- Publication date: 1907
- Publication place: United Kingdom
- Media type: Print: hardback
- Dewey Decimal: 828.809

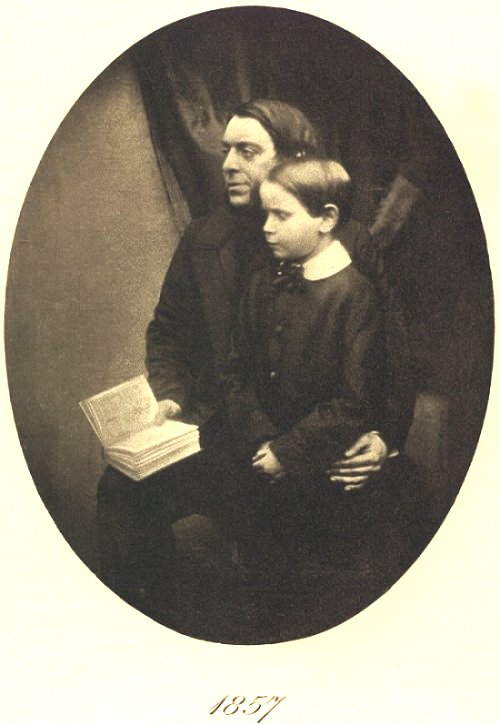
Philip Henry Gosse with his son Edmund Gosse, 1857. Frontispiece to the first edition of Father and Son.

Father and Son, originally subtitled "A Study of Two Temperaments", is a 1907 memoir by the poet and critic Edmund Gosse, initially published anonymously. Gosse had already published a biography of his father in 1890.

Father and Son describes Edmund Gosse's early years in an exceptionally devout Plymouth Brethren home. His mother, Emily Gosse, who died of breast cancer at the age of 50, was a writer of Christian tracts. His father, Philip Henry Gosse, was an influential and largely self-taught invertebrate zoologist and student of marine biology who, after his wife's death, took Edmund to live in Devon. The book focuses on the relationship between the stern religious father, who rejected the new evolutionary theories of his scientific colleague Charles Darwin, and the son's gradual rejection of Christian fundamentalism. Gosse used pseudonyms throughout the book, but many of the people depicted have since been identified.

Michael Newton, a Lecturer in English at University College, London, has called the book "a brilliant, and often comic, record of the small diplomacies of home: those indirections, omissions, insincerities, and secrecies that underlie family relationships". "[B]rilliantly written, and full of gentle wit," the book is "an unmatched social document, preserving for us whole the experience of childhood in a Protestant sect in the Victorian period. ... Above all, it is one of our best accounts of adolescence, particularly for those who endured...a religious upbringing."

The literary critic Vivian Gornick has described the book as an early example of the modern memoir of "becoming", in which "What happened to the writer is not what matters; what matters is the large sense that the writer is able to make of what happened."

Although Edmund Gosse prefaces the book with the claim that the incidents described are sober reality, a modern biography of Philip Henry Gosse by Ann Thwaite presents him not as a repressive tyrant who cruelly scrutinized the state of his son's soul, but as a gentle and thoughtful person of "delicacy and inner warmth". The biographer and critic D. J. Taylor described Gosse's portrayal of his father as "horribly partial" and claimed that, in Thwaite's work, "the supposedly sequestered, melancholic pattern of [Edmund] Gosse's London and Devonshire childhood is repeatedly proved to have contained great affection, friends, fun and even light reading".

== Editions ==
After its first publication Gosse made fifty changes to the text of Father and Son, most of which were minor but some of which corrected errors of fact. A bibliographical description of the editions and impressions of the book (sixty-two in all) includes information on translations into Arabic, French, German, Italian, Japanese (partial), Spanish and Swedish.

Source: Library of Congress

- New York, C. Scribner's sons, 1907
- London, W. Heinemann, 1907
- New York, Oxford University Press [1934]
- London : Heinemann, 1958
- Boston, Houghton Mifflin, [1965, c1907]
- London, Heinemann Educational, 1970, ISBN 0-435-13350-0
- London; New York : Oxford University Press, 1974, ISBN 0-19-255401-8
- Oxford [England]; New York : Oxford University Press, 2004, ISBN 0-19-284066-5

== In popular culture ==
Dennis Potter said this book inspired his 1976 television drama Where Adam Stood, starring Alan Badel as Philip Gosse.

Father and Son partially inspired Peter Carey's 1988 novel Oscar and Lucinda. It won the Booker Prize in 1988 and the Miles Franklin Award in 1989.
