= Howards and Sons =

British pharmaceutical business

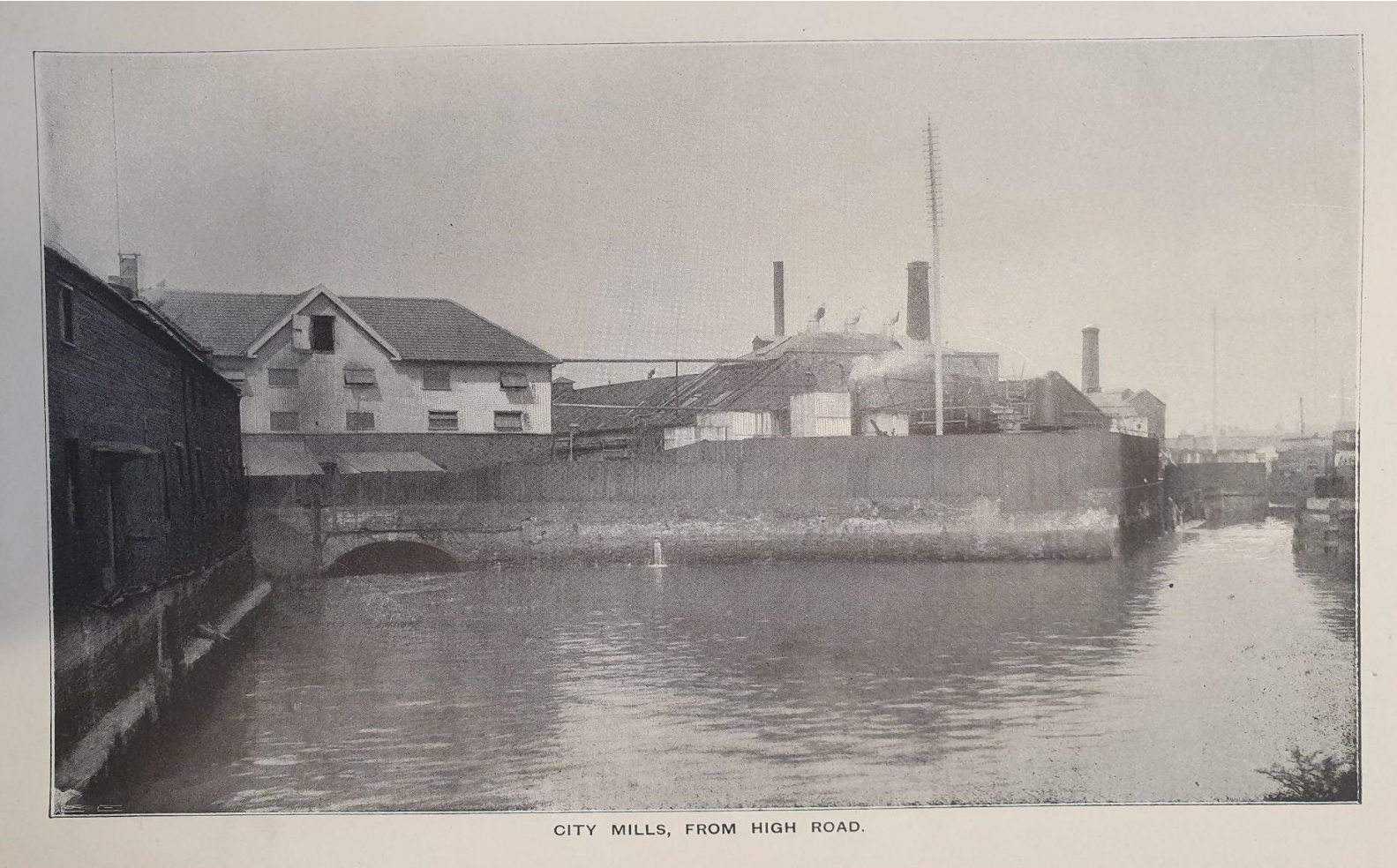
A view of the Quinine Department, Howards and Sons factory at City Mills, Stratford, 1897.

Howards and Sons was a pharmaceutical business established in 1797 by Quaker chemists William Allen and Luke Howard under the name 'Allen & Howard'. The business consisted of a dispensing pharmacy in Plough Court managed by Allen and a laboratory in Plaistow, Essex managed by Howard. Allen and Howard amicably dissolved their business in 1805 with each keeping their respective sections.

As Howard's chemical manufacturing business grew, new premises were needed and he shifted the laboratory to City Mills, Stratford where it flourished over the 19th century becoming Howards and Sons in 1858. It was under this title that it became a well-known supplier of quinine and aspirin.

Notable partners include John Eliot Howard, son of Luke Howard, who became a specialist in cinchona bark identification and quinine-related research, and Joseph Jewell (1763–1846).

Manufacture of chemicals ceased in 1975.

The business-related archives are located at the London Metropolitan Archives, Redbridge Heritage Centre and John Eliot Howard's cinchona archives at the Royal Botanic Gardens, Kew.

== Table showing selected iterations of Howards and Sons 1797-19 ==
Years	Name	Partners	Location & notes
1797–1806	Allen & Howard	William Allen, Luke Howard	Plaistow, Essex
1805–1806	L. Howard & Co.	Luke Howard	City Mills, Stratford from 1806
1807–1823	Howard, Jewell & Gibson	Luke Howard, Joseph Jewell & John Gibson	
1824–1830	Howard, Jewell, Gibson & Howard	Luke Howard, Joseph Jewell, John Gibson & Robert Howard	Luke Howard and Joseph Jewell retired on 31 December 1830
1832–1837 or 1841	Howard, Gibson & Co.	John Gibson, Robert Howard, John Eliot Howard, Robert Gibson & John Kent	
1841–1858	Howards & Kent		
1858–1903	Howards & Sons	Robert died in 1871, after which John Eliot became a sleeping partner. David and Dillworth Howard took on management.	1875, parts of factory destroyed by fire; 1898 Moved to Ilford
1903 onwards	Howards & Sons Ltd	Wider members of the Howard family	1914 City Mills lease dissolved. Up until 1949, Howards and Sons existed with many subsidiaries not detailed here.
1961	Howards of Ilford	Laporte Industries Ltd takeover	
1975	Bilstar Ltd		Renamed and chemical manufacture ceases.
