= John Eliot Howard =

English chemist

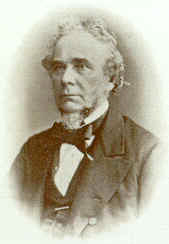
John Eliot Howard

John Eliot Howard (11 December 1807 – 22 November 1883) was an English chemist who conducted pioneering work collecting and analysing cinchona bark which led to significant influence in the quinine industry, particularly within 19th Century British-Indian Plantations.

Howard was born in Plaistow, Essex, the son of Luke Howard a noted Quaker meteorologist and chemist. He worked at the family pharmaceutical manufacturing business of Howards and Sons. He was elected a Fellow of the Royal Society in June 1874.

He was the author of scientific works including The Nueva Quinologia of Pavon (1862) and The Quinology of the East Indian Plantations (1869–1876), religious works including a commentary on the book of Hebrews and histories including The Island Of The Saints, about the Reformation in Ireland. His concern about issues of religion and science was reflected in his membership in two London organizations from 1872: the Victoria Institute, devoted to that subject to which he contributed thirteen papers, and to the Society of Biblical Archaeology, whose aim was to investigate antiquities of biblical lands.

== Open Brethren Affiliation ==
Howard was born into a Quaker family, and his eventual alignment with Brethren was a process of years. He apparently first came in contact with Brethren through B.W. Newton (also from a Quaker family). In 1838 Howard's association with Brethren led to his involvement in the assembly at the new Brook Street Meeting House in Tottenham, now Brook Street Chapel, which was founded in 1838–1839 by a number of other Christians including Howard's brother Robert; his father Luke (the 'namer of clouds' and 'father of meteorology') helped to finance the building of the chapel (a portrait of the father and son hangs in the National Portrait Gallery).

It was with the opening of the Brook Street Chapel that Howard's transition to Brethren – and specifically "Open Brethren", as they came to be known – was complete.

== Personal life ==
Howard married Maria Crewdson on 9 September 1830 and the couple had nine children, including Joseph Howard, who was later Conservative MP for Tottenham. The family lived at Lord's Meade, Lordship Lane, Tottenham.

Howard died in Edmonton, London, on 22 November 1883 at the age of 76, and was buried in Tottenham Cemetery with a . One of his grandchildren was the ornithologist, Henry Eliot Howard.

The genus Howardia (a synonym of Pogonopus) of the Rubiaceae was dedicated to him.
