= R. B. Freeman =

British zoologist and bibliographer

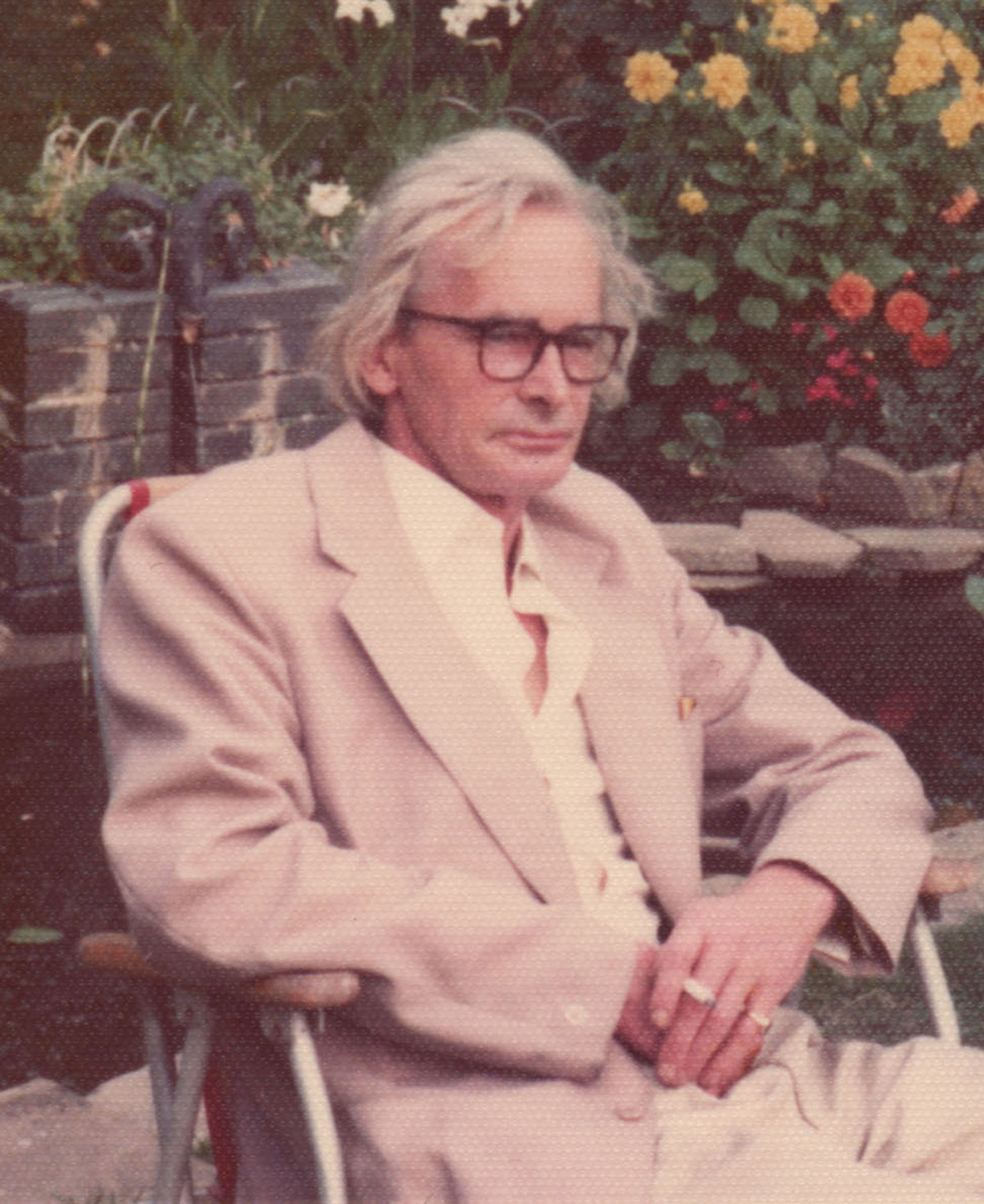
- Freeman in London, 1974.
- Born: 1 April 1915; London, England
- Died: 1 September 1986 (aged 71); London, England
- Education: Magdalen College, Oxford
- Known for: The Works of Charles Darwin: An Annotated Bibliographical Handlist; Charles Darwin: A Companion; Philip Henry Gosse: A Bibliography
- Scientific career
- Fields: Zoology, natural history, bibliography
- Workplaces: University College London

Richard Broke Freeman (1 April 1915 – 1 September 1986) was a British zoologist, historian of zoology, bibliographer of natural history and book collector. Known professionally as R. B. Freeman, he compiled comprehensive reference works on Charles Darwin and on P. H. Gosse.

== Life ==
Freeman was born in London. Educated at Magdalen College, Oxford (1935–38), he received his BA in 1938 (First Class honours in Zoology) and MA in 1950. He was reading for his doctor of philosophy degree with a Senior Demyship at Magdalen when World War II began. From 1939 to 1946, he was employed in pest control by the Ministry of Agriculture and Fisheries at the Bureau of Animal Population in Oxford. He rose to the rank of Major with the 111th Rocket Anti-Aircraft Battery, 101st Oxford Home Guard in 1944, and was awarded an MBE for meritorious service.

Freeman was married to Dr. Mary Whitear, a zoologist at the University of London, and they had two sons. In 1946, he was appointed Lecturer in Zoology at University College London, and from 1951 to his retirement in 1982, he was University Reader in Taxonomy. At the time of his death from a sudden heart attack, he was Emeritus Reader.

== Natural history bibliographies and collections ==
Through regular contacts with booksellers (antiquarian and otherwise), by attending auctions (including at Sotheby's), visiting libraries, correspondence with scholars, his own studies, and through buying trips to the west country in England and elsewhere, Freeman built up an immense first-hand knowledge of his subjects. In the process, he also accumulated an imposing library of Darwin and natural history works. In 1967, Freeman was persuaded by David Esplin, an associate librarian at the University of Toronto, to sell to that institution his Darwin collection – which included some 140 copies of The Origin of Species. That purchase “became the core of what is now the most extensive collection of the published works of Darwin in the world.”

=== Darwin ===
Freeman called The Works of Charles Darwin: An Annotated Bibliographical Handlist his first attempt to list “all the editions and issues [of works by Charles Darwin] which I have seen, or seen reliably recorded" no more than "a list" which is "far from complete." That 1965 work contained some 541 items; 12 years later, a second edition numbered 1,805 entries, though it maintained the same title. Citing another scholar's assertion that “it would be as hopeless a task to search out all the reprints [of Darwin’s Origin of Species] as it would be to discover those of its great – and almost as shattering – coeval, The Rubáiyát of Omar Khayyám", Freeman wrote: “I have tried to do just that for all of Darwin’s works.”

The second revised edition of The Works of Charles Darwin was “virtually a new book” and “a required purchase for students of Darwin and of the history of evolutionary biology generally” which “stands second only to a facsimile of the first edition of The Origin of Species.”

A "remarkable" reader's guide to "Darwin's life, his ancestry, collaterals and descendants, his friends and a few enemies, and his scientific correspondents", Charles Darwin: A Companion appeared in 1978, and included information about what Darwin wrote and thought on politics and society. By permission of Freeman's wife, Dr. Mary Whitear, an expanded edition, which included Freeman's own unpublished additions and corrections (plus that of others), went online in 2007.

=== British Natural History Books ===
In 1980, Freeman published British Natural History Books 1495–1900: A Handlist, which "any self-respecting library and every calculating collector should possess." The work listed some 4,206 items.

=== Philip Henry Gosse and Emily Gosse ===
In 1972, the University of Toronto Library offered to buy Freeman's Gosse and natural history collection of some 1,000 volumes, a transaction completed in 1974. In 1980, Freeman published Philip Henry Gosse: A Bibliography (co-authored with Douglas Wertheimer). With 466 entries, the book superseded Peter Stageman's privately printed, limited-focus 1955 A Bibliography of the First Editions of Philip Henry Gosse, F.R.S. Philip Henry Gosse: A Bibliography was “an invaluable guide”, one which “professes to be no more than a bibliography” but “the net result is to provide a fascinating account of Gosse’s career.” Another reviewer described the book as an "indispensable tool for studying the sectarian faith and non-Darwinian science of a notable Victorian naturalist."

In 1974, Freeman had Entomologia Alabamensis, an unpublished manuscript volume of insects of Alabama drawn by P.H. Gosse while he lived there in 1838, photographed in color. At the same time, he enlisted K.G.V. Smith to oversee an "Annotated Index to Insects Mentioned in [Gosse's] Letters from Alabama (1859)." That project drew on Smith's expertise and that of 18 others who were also at the British Museum of Natural History, as well as two experts from the US Department of Agriculture. They gave modern scientific names to the insects in Gosse's Letters from Alabama, co-ordinating those identifications with the illustrations in Entomologia Alabamensis. The project included a bibliography but was never published, and fell from view after Freeman's death.

In 2021, a posthumously-published collaboration with Wertheimer appeared as “Emily Gosse: A Bibliography.” This first-ever attempt at an inventory of the writing of Gosse’s first wife had been completed in 1975 but remained in manuscript. The work was revised by Wertheimer.

== Selected works ==
=== Articles ===
- ”Properties of poisons used in rodent control”, in D. Chitty (editor), Control of rats and mice, vol. 1 (Oxford: Clarendon, 1954), pp. 25–146
- Notes on Robert E. Grant, M.D. and on the Department of Zoology and Comparative Anatomy, University College London (Produced by the Department, 1964)
- "Charles Darwin on the routes of male humble bees", Bulletin of the British Museum (Natural History), Historical Series, Vol. 3, No. 6 (May 1968), pp. 179–189
- ”Children’s natural history books before Queen Victoria”, History of Education Society Bulletin Nos. 17–18 (Spring, August 1976), 7–21; 6–34

=== Books ===
- The Works of Charles Darwin: An Annotated Bibliographical Handlist (London: Dawson, 1965) (Second edition: 1977)
- Classification of the Animal Kingdom: An Illustrated guide (London: English Universities Press, 1972)
- Charles Darwin: A Companion (London: Dawson, 1978)
- British Natural History Books 1495–1900: A Handlist (London: Dawson, 1980)
- Philip Henry Gosse: A Bibliography, with Douglas Wertheimer (London: Dawson, 1980)
- Darwin Pedigrees (London: R.B. Freeman, 1984)
- The Works of Charles Darwin, edited by Paul H. Barrett and R. B. Freeman (New York University Press, 1987–9), vols. 1–10
