= Anne Savage =

Anne Savage may refer to:

- Ann Savage (1921–2008), American actress
- Ann Savage (astronomer) (1946–2017), British astronomer
- Anne Savage (artist) (1896–1971), Canadian painter and art teacher
- Anne Savage (DJ) (born 1969), English disc jockey
- Anne Savage, Baroness Berkeley (c. 1496–before 1546), lady-in-waiting to Anne Boleyn, second wife of Henry VIII of England

== See also ==
- Anna Savage (disambiguation)
