= Emily Bowes =

British artist (1806–1857)

Emily Bowes Gosse (10 November 1806 – 10 February 1857) was a prolific religious tract writer and author of evangelical Christian poems and articles.

== Early life ==
Emily Bowes was born in London, England, to William and Hannah Bowes, both from old New England families. Her early years were divided among Merioneth, Exmouth, and London, and in 1824 she commenced work as a governess to Revd John Hawkins in Berkshire, later moving to the home of Rev Sir Christopher John Musgrave, in Hove.

== Career ==
After these spells, Emily returned to London to stay with her parents in Clapton, North London. She attended the Plymouth Brethren assembly in Hackney, where she met her future husband, Philip Henry Gosse. They had known each other for several years before they married at Brook Street Chapel, Tottenham, in 1848. Emily was 42, and her husband was 38. Emily gave birth to their only child, Edmund in 1849.

It has been incorrectly claimed that Emily was a Victorian landscape painter who studied with John Sell Cotman, (Note: Some writers have confused the first “Mrs. Philip Henry Gosse” (née Emily Bowes) with the second "Mrs. Philip Henry Gosse" (née Eliza Brightwen, 1813-1900; herself not to be confused with her brother's wife, also called Eliza Brightwen). Emily Bowes Gosse was neither a painter nor an illustrator, did not study with John Sell Cotman and did not illustrate P. H. Gosse’s Aquarium) and an illustrator whose work includes the uncredited chromolithographs for the book of her husband P. H. Gosse The Aquarium: an unveiling of the wonders of the deep sea (1854).

== Illness and death ==
In April 1856, Emily discovered a lump in her breast and went with a friend to confirm her concerns with a local doctor. The next day, she and Philip saw a family member for a second opinion and were referred to James Paget, who recommended "instant excision". Following another recommendation, they pursued an alternative treatment with Jesse Weldon Fell. The treatment involved cutting lines into the breast and adding a series of topical applications, which caused Emily significant pain. The experience and her suffering is detailed in memoirs by her husband and son. They are also detailed in a review of a 2001 reprint of her husband's memorial.

After eventually discontinuing the treatment, Emily died in Islington on 10 February 1857.

== Publications ==
Gosse published two series of Hymns and Sacred Poems (1832, 1834) before she married, and was a successful religious tract writer and periodical contributor (jointly producing some works with her husband). Of sixty Narrative Tracts in book form, fifty-four were written by her and the rest by her husband. In total, at least sixty-three Emily Gosse narrative or gospel tracts were published, with an aggregate sale of seven million copies by 1866. She authored 40 periodical articles. Her book Abraham And His Children (1855) consisted of object lessons using Biblical characters to illustrate parenting principles, and was favorably reviewed. Next to the hymn-writer Frances Bevan, she was the most prolific of Victorian Brethren female writers.

== Sources ==
- Gosse, Philip Henry, A Memorial of the Last Days on Earth of Emily Gosse, 1857.
- Shipton, Anna, Tell Jesus: recollections of Emily Gosse, London: Morgan and Chase, [1863].
- Gosse, Edmund, Father and Son; a study of two temperaments (William Heinemann, 1907, initially anonymous and many later editions under his name).
- Boyd, Robert, Emily Gosse: A Life of Faith and Works : the Story of Her Life and Witness with Her Published Poems and Samples of Her Prose Writings, Olivet Books, 2004. ISBN 0-9548283-0-5
- Freeman, R. B. and Douglas Wertheimer, "Emily Gosse: A Bibliography", Brethren Historical Review 17, 2021, 25-78. ISSN 1755-9383.
- Wertheimer, Douglas (2024). Philip Henry Gosse: A Biography. Brethren Archivists and Historians Network. ISBN 978-1739128326.
- Lingard, Ann, Seaside Pleasures (Littoralis Press, 2003). ISBN 0-9544572-0-X
- Thwaite, Ann, Glimpses of the Wonderful: The Life of Philip Henry Gosse, 1810-1888 (London: Faber & Faber, 2002, ISBN 0-571-19328-5)
