= Omphalos hypothesis =

Creationist hypothesis

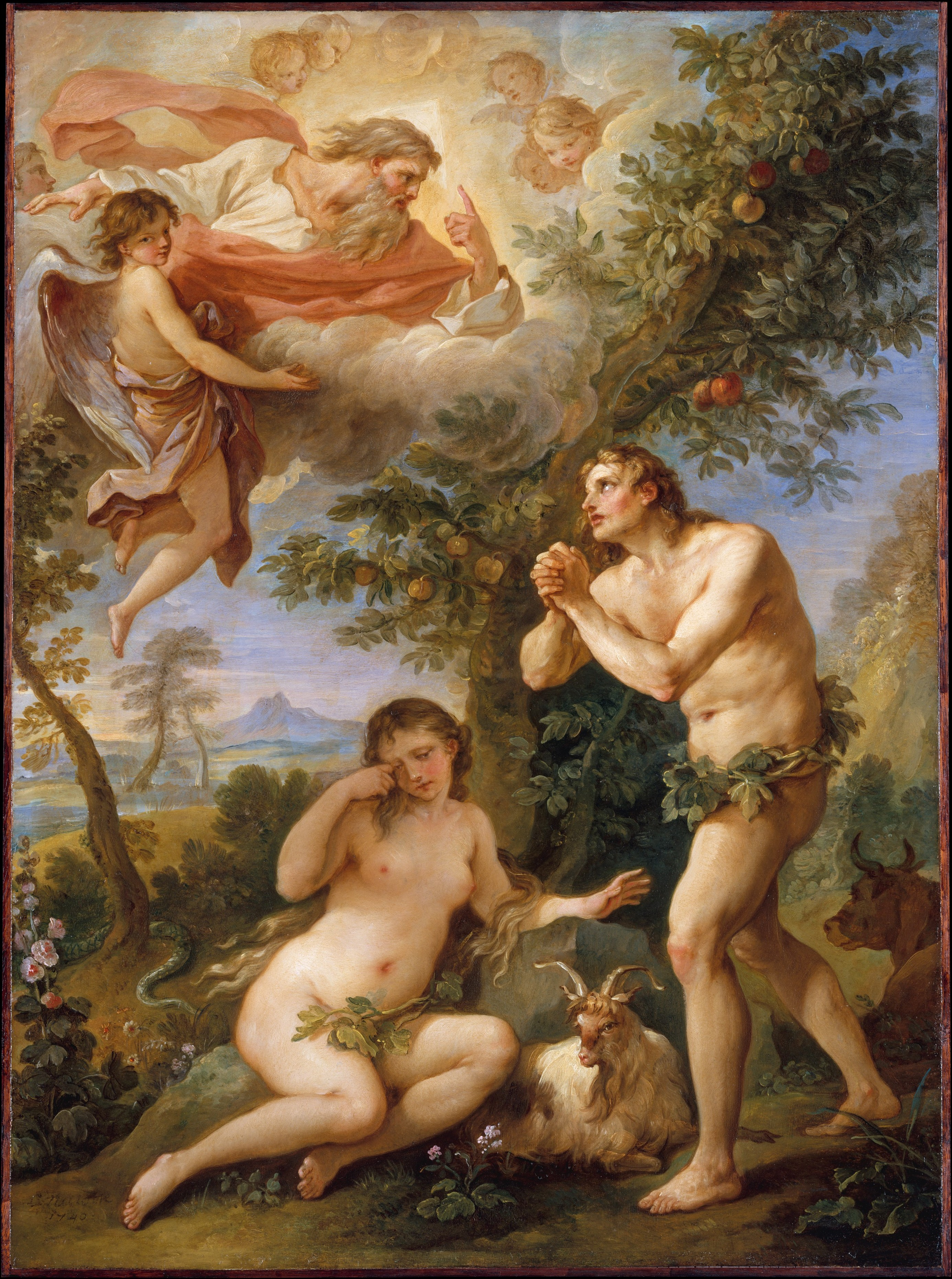
An 18th-century painting depicting Adam and Eve with navels. Since the navel marks the attachment point of the umbilical cord, this would appear to attest to a nonexistent past spent in utero.

The Omphalos hypothesis is one attempt to reconcile the scientific evidence that the Earth is billions of years old with a literal interpretation of the Genesis creation narrative, which implies that the Earth is only a few thousand years old. It is based on the religious belief that the universe was created by a divine being, within the past six to ten thousand years (in keeping with flood geology), and that the presence of objective, verifiable evidence that the universe is older than approximately ten millennia is due to the creator introducing false evidence that makes the universe appear significantly older.

The idea was named after the title of a book, Omphalos (1857), in which Philip Henry Gosse argued that for the world to be "functional", God must have created the Earth with mountains and canyons, trees with growth rings, Adam and Eve with fully grown hair, fingernails, and navels (ὀμφαλός omphalos is Greek for "navel"), and all living creatures with fully formed evolutionary features, etc., and that, therefore, no empirical evidence about the age of the Earth or universe can be taken as reliable.

Various supporters of Young Earth creationism have given different explanations for their belief that the universe is filled with false evidence of the universe's age, including a belief that some things needed to be created at a certain age for the ecosystems to function, or their belief that the creator was deliberately planting deceptive evidence.

Gosse's thesis was widely rejected at the time, but saw some revival in the 20th century by some Young Earth creationists, who extended the argument to include visible light that appears to originate from far-off stars and galaxies (addressing the "starlight problem").

== Development of the idea ==
=== Pre-scientific sources ===
Stories of the beginning of human life based on the creation story in Genesis have been published for centuries. The 4th-century theologian Ephrem the Syrian described a world in which divine creation instantly produced fully grown organisms:

Although the grasses were only a moment old at their creation, they appeared as if they were months old. Likewise, the trees, although only a day old when they sprouted forth, were nevertheless like ... years old as they were fully grown and fruits were already budding on their branches.

=== 19th-century thinkers ===
By the 19th century, scientific evidence of the Earth's age had been collected, and it disagreed with a literal reading of the biblical accounts. This evidence was rejected by some writers at the time, such as François-René de Chateaubriand. Chateaubriand wrote in his 1802 book, Génie du christianisme (Part I Book IV Chapter V), that "God might have created, and doubtless did create, the world with all the marks of antiquity and completeness which it now exhibits." In modern times, Rabbi Dovid Gottlieb supported a similar position, saying that the objective scientific evidence for an old universe is strong, but wrong, and that the traditional Jewish calendar is correct.

In the middle of the 19th century, the disagreement between scientific evidence about the age of the Earth and the Western religious traditions was a significant debate among intellectuals. Gosse published Omphalos in 1857 to explain his answer to this question. He concluded that the religious tradition was correct. Gosse began with the earlier idea that the Earth contained mature organisms at the instant they were created, and that these organisms had false signs of their development, such as hair on mammals, which grows over time. He extended this idea of creating a single mature organism to creating mature systems, and concluded that fossils were an artifact of the creation process and merely part of what was necessary to make creation work. Therefore, he reasoned, fossils and other signs of the Earth's age could not be used to prove its age.

Other contemporary proposals for reconciling the stories of creation in Genesis with the scientific evidence included the interval theory or gap theory of creation, in which a large interval of time passed in between the initial creation of the universe and the beginning of the Six Days of Creation. This idea was put forward by Archbishop John Bird Sumner of Canterbury in Treatise on the Records of Creation. Another popular idea, promoted by the English theologian John Pye Smith, was that the Garden of Eden described the events of only one small location. A third proposal, by French naturalist Georges-Louis Leclerc, Comte de Buffon, held that the six "days" of the creation story were arbitrary and large ages rather than 24-hour periods.

Theologians rejected Gosse's proposal on the grounds that it seemed to make the divine creator tell lies—either lying in the scriptures, or lying in nature. Scientists rejected it on the grounds that it disagreed with uniformitarianism, an explanation of geology that was widely supported at the time, and due to the impossibility of testing or falsifying the idea.

=== Modern creationists ===
Some modern creationists still argue against scientific evidence in the same way. For instance, John D. Morris, president of the Institute for Creation Research, wrote in 1990 about the "appearance of age", saying that "what [God] created was functionally complete right from the start—able to fulfill the purpose for which it was created".

He does not extend this idea to the geological record, preferring to believe that it was all created in the Flood, but others such as Gerald E. Aardsma go further, with his idea of "virtual history". This appears to suggest that events after the creation have changed the "virtual history" we now see, including the fossils:

This raises one more major point of difference, the handling of the Fall. Briefly, Creation with Appearance of Age runs into a theological snag with things like fossils of fish with other smaller fish in their stomachs: "Do you mean that God chose to paint, of all things, a facade of SUFFERING and DEATH onto the creation when He gave it this arbitrary appearance of age at the time of creation?" The virtual history paradigm recognizes simply that all creation type miracles entail a virtual history, so the Fall, with its creation type miracles (by which the nature of the creation was changed—"subjected to futility") carried with it its own (fallen) virtual history, which is the virtual history we now see. We do not see the original utopian pre-Fall creation with its (presumably utopian) virtual history.

== Criticisms ==
=== Beginning of false creation ===
Although Gosse's original Omphalos hypothesis specifies a popular creation story, others have proposed that the idea does not preclude creation as recently as five minutes ago, including memories of times before this created in situ. This idea is sometimes called Last Thursdayism by its opponents, as in "the world might as well have been created last Thursday."

Scientifically, the concept is both unverifiable and unfalsifiable through any scientific study—in other words, it is impossible to conclude the truth of the hypothesis, since it requires the empirical data itself to have been arbitrarily created to look the way it does at every observable level of detail.

=== Deceptive creator ===
From a religious viewpoint, it can be interpreted as God having created a "fake" universe, such as illusions of light emitted from supernovae that never really happened, or volcanic mountains that were never really volcanoes in the first place and that never actually experienced erosion.

In a rebuttal of the claim that God might have implanted a false history of the age of the universe to test our faith in the truth of the Torah, Rabbi Natan Slifkin, an author whose works have been banned by several Haredi rabbis for going against the tenets of the Talmud, writes:

God essentially created two conflicting accounts of Creation: one in nature, and one in the Torah. How can it be determined which is the real story, and which is the fake designed to mislead us? One could equally propose that it is nature that presents the real story, and that the Torah was devised by God to test us with a fake history! One has to be able to rely on God's truthfulness if religion is to function. Or, to put it another way—if God went to enormous lengths to convince us that the world is billions of years old, who are we to disagree?

== Similar formulations ==
=== Five-minute hypothesis ===
The five-minute hypothesis is a skeptical hypothesis put forth by the philosopher Bertrand Russell, that proposes that the universe sprang into existence five minutes ago from nothing, with human memory and all other signs of history included. It is a commonly used example of how one may maintain extreme philosophical skepticism with regard to memory and trust in evidentially derived historical chronology.

=== Borges's Tlön, Uqbar, Orbis Tertius ===
Jorge Luis Borges, in his 1940 work, Tlön, Uqbar, Orbis Tertius, describes a fictional world in which some essentially follow as a religious belief a philosophy much like Russell's discussion on the logical extreme of Gosse's theory:

One of the schools of Tlön goes so far as to negate time: it reasons that the present is indefinite, that the future has no reality other than as a present hope, the past none other than present memory.

Borges had earlier written a short essay, "The Creation and P. H. Gosse" that explored the rejection of Gosse's Omphalos. Borges argued that its unpopularity stemmed from Gosse's explicit (if inadvertent) outlining of what Borges characterized as absurdities in the Genesis story.

=== Last Thursdayism ===
The satirical "Last Thursday" version likely originated in the 1990s. Last Thursdayism presents the Omphalos hypothesis as a parody religion. The "Church of Last Thursdayism" website attempted to equate belief in Last Thursdayism with an actual religion, listing "tenets of faith":

We, the Last Thursdayists, followers of Last Thursdayism, members of The Church of Last Thursday, believe

- that the universe was created on Thursday, and will expire on Thursday.
- that the universe was created by You as a test for yourself.
- that you will be rewarded or punished when this universe expires based on your actions here.
- that left-handedness is a sinful temptation.
- that everyone but you was placed here and pre-programmed to act as parts of your test environment.
- that everyone but you knows this.

== See also ==
- "A Clockwork Origin" – 9th episode of the 6th season of Futurama
- Boltzmann brain – Philosophical thought experiment
- Christian mythology – Body of myths associated with Christianity
- Conflict thesis – Concept in history of science
- Copernican principle – Principle that humans are not privileged observers of the universe
- Dark City – 1998 film by Alex Proyas
- Kabbalah – Type of Jewish mysticism
- "Omphalos" – 2019 short story by Ted Chiang
- Russell's teapot – Analogy devised by Bertrand Russell
- Strata – 1981 novel by Terry Pratchett
