= Omphalos (book) =

1857 book by Philip Henry Gosse

Omphalos: An Attempt to Untie the Geological Knot is a book by Philip Gosse, written in 1857 (two years before Darwin's On the Origin of Species), in which he argues that the fossil record is not evidence of evolution, but rather that it is an act of creation inevitably made so that the world would appear to be older than it is. The reasoning parallels the reasoning that Gosse chose to explain why Adam (who would have had no mother) had a navel: Though Adam would have had no need of a navel, God gave him one anyway to give him the appearance of having a human ancestry. Thus, the name of the book, Omphalos, which means 'navel' in Greek.

Darwin is mentioned several times within the book, but always with considerable respect. Gosse had attended meetings at the Royal Society where evolutionary theory was tested by Darwin before the publication of Origin—and had even made similar observations himself about variation of species in his own studies into marine biology—and considered Darwin's reasoning scientifically sound.

== Synopsis ==
The book was precised by his son Edmund Gosse:

Life is a circle, no one stage of which more than any other affords a natural commencing-point. Every living object has an omphalos, or an egg, or a seed, which points irresistibly to the existence of a previous living object of the same kind. Creation, therefore, must mean the sudden bursting into the circle, and its phenomena, produced full grown by the arbitrary will of God, would certainly present the stigmata of a pre-existent existence. Each created tree would display the marks of sloughed bark and fallen leaves, though it had never borne those leaves or that bark. The teeth of each brute would be worn away with exercise which it had never taken. By innumerable examples he shows that this must have been the case with all living forms. If so, then why may not the fossils themselves be part of this breaking into the circle? Why may not the strata, with their buried fauna and flora, belong to the general scheme of the prochronic development of the plan of the life-history of this globe?

== Reception ==
The book was widely rejected at the time, sold few copies, and had almost no supporters. Although the publisher used in advertising an extract from the Natural History Review: "We have no hesitation in pronouncing this book to be the most important and best-written that has yet appeared on the very interesting question with which it deals. We believe the logic of the book to be unanswerable, its laws fully deduced", the rest of the sentence in the review reads "and the whole, considered as a play of metaphysical subtlety, absolutely complete; and yet we venture to predict that its conclusions will not be accepted as probable by one in ten thousand readers." The reviewer concluded that Omphalos contained "idle speculations, fit only to please a philosopher in his hours of relaxation, but hardly worthy of the serious attention of any man, whether scientific or not". The geologist Joseph Beete Jukes was more scathing in a later issue: "To a man of a really serious and religious turn of mind, this treatment is far more repulsive than that even of the author of Vestiges of Creation and the Lamarckian School".

The Rev. Charles Kingsley, author of The Water-Babies and a friend of Gosse, was asked to review Gosse's book. Refusing, he wrote to Gosse:

Shall I tell you the truth? It is best. Your book is the first that ever made me doubt, and I fear it will make hundreds do so. Your book tends to prove this—that if we accept the fact of absolute creation, God becomes Deus quidam deceptor ['God who is sometimes a deceiver']. I do not mean merely in the case of fossils which pretend to be the bones of dead animals; but in the one single case of your newly created scars on the pandanus trunk, your newly created Adam's navel, you make God tell a lie. It is not my reason, but my conscience which revolts here ... I cannot ... believe that God has written on the rocks one enormous and superfluous lie for all mankind." (reproduced from Hardin, 1982).

For a long time, apart from the discussion in his biography of his father, the only widely read though oblique references to the book were to be found in Father and Son, the psychological portrait of Philip Gosse by his son Edmund Gosse published in 1907. He wrote:

Never was a book cast upon the waters with greater anticipation of success than was this curious, this obstinate, this fanatical volume ... He offered it with a glowing gesture to atheists and Christians alike. This was to be a universal panacea; this the system of intellectual therapeutics which could not but heal all the maladies of the age. But alas, atheists and Christians alike looked at it and laughed, and threw it away.

Martin Gardner, in his 1952 book Fads and Fallacies in the Name of Science, observed: "Not the least of its remarkable virtues is that although it won not a single convert, it presented a theory so logically perfect, and so in accord with geological facts that no amount of scientific evidence will ever be able to refute it ... Not a single truth of geology need be abandoned, yet the harmony with Genesis is complete".

This internal consistency was also discussed by the American biologist Stephen Jay Gould in a 1987 article entitled "Adam's Navel", which has since been republished as a mini book. He comments:

But what is so desperately wrong about Omphalos? Only this really (and perhaps paradoxically): that we can devise no way to find out whether it is wrong—or for that matter, right. Omphalos is the classical example of an utterly untestable notion, for the world will look exactly the same in all its intricate detail whether fossils and strata are prochronic or products of an extended history.

It had earlier been referred to in a short work by Jorge Luis Borges.

Roizen has suggested that "perhaps the rejection of Omphalos is a measure of how much—even before the publication of Darwin's earthshaking book—the theological system of assumptions had already waned." In the 1820s and 30s the scriptural geologists had fought a battle against the rise of uniformitarianism and indeed Gosse suggests in his preface that Granville Penn had captured the essence of his argument 30 years previously.

The theory presented in the book is now called the Omphalos hypothesis: that the world and everything in it could have been created at any time, even mere moments ago, with even our own memories being false indications of its age. This is a largely philosophical position, not a scientific one.
