= Anna Shipton =

Anna Shipton née Savage (January 1815 – 5 November 1901) was an English religious writer who, from a relatively early age, wrote essays and poems relating to Christianity.

She was born to Edward Savage, a solicitor from Evesham, Worcestershire, and Emma Harrison of Cheltenham, Gloucestershire, the latter of whom died in 1817. Still named Anna Savage, her first publication came in 1829, when she was fourteen years old.

After a period of dormancy, she was productive continuously after 1837. Her father died in 1838, and in 1848, she married Joseph Shipton. By 1852, they were separated, allegedly due to extramarital affairs by Joseph. She continued writing and began to travel extensively, publishing over twenty books in the following decades, which were popular in both Europe and the United States. She was "a voluminous writer on religious and spiritual subjects, some beautiful hymns, and many hundreds of leaflets coming from her pen". One source wrote of Shipton that she "occupies a niche all her own; for while all her chapters could be described as sermons, they are unique sermons, after the order of those of Frances Ridley Havergal. They are gems; and no single reading can reveal their many and varied excellences". Another described her as "a lady resident at Clifton, who has written a large number of sacred poems, and is very widely known among Christians of all denominations as the author of "Whispers in the Psalms," and many other similar productions". Her 1863 biography of her friend Emily Gosse in particular achieved remarkable success. It appeared in sixty-one impressions in England by 1911, bore the imprint of six American publishers and remained in print there from 1867 to 1916, and was translated into Dutch, French, German (nine editions) and Swedish.

After living in mainland Europe from the mid-1860s to the 1880s, Shipton returned to the UK and settled first in Sussex, and then St. Leonard's on Sea. Joseph Shipton had "pre-deceased her by many years", and after a long period of feeble health, she died with no remaining family.
