= Bernd Brunner =

German writer (born 1964)

- Born: Berlin, Germany
- Education: Berlin School of Economics; Free University of Berlin
- Occupation: Writer
- Writing career
- Language: German
- Period: 2003-present
- Genre: Non-fiction
- Notable works: Bears: A Brief History (2007); Moon: A Brief History (2010); The Art of Lying Down (2013)
- Website: www.berndbrunner.com

Bernd Brunner (born May 27, 1964) is a writer of non-fiction and essays. His best known works are peripatetic explorations of the relationship between people and deceptively simple subjects, such as bears, the moon, and lying down.

His essay on the street dogs of Istanbul, first published in The Smart Set was selected by Elizabeth Gilbert for the anthology The Best American Travel Writing 2013. Brunner divides his time between Istanbul and Berlin.

== Life and career ==
Brunner was born in Berlin, Germany. He graduated both from the Berlin School of Economics and the Free University of Berlin. As a recipient of a scholarship from the German Academic Exchange Service he spent an academic year at the University of Washington in 1991/92. He had editorial positions in television, magazine publishing and book publishing.

Brunner works at the crossroads of history, culture, and science and is the author of several books, including Bears: A Brief History and Moon: A Brief History which have been translated into several languages and were reviewed in major outlets such as The New York Times, Slate.com, The New Yorker, Los Angeles Times, The Telegraph, The Times, The Sunday Times, The Washington Post, The Times Literary Supplement, Nature, and The Guardian.

He has contributed articles to magazines Lapham's Quarterly, The Paris Review Daily, The Smart Set, aeon, The Public Domain Review, Quartz, Cabinet, PBS Nature, The Wall Street Journal Speakeasy and The Huffington Post, The Times Literary Supplement as well as various leading German-language publications including Süddeutsche Zeitung, Neue Zürcher Zeitung, Frankfurter Allgemeine Sonntagszeitung, and Die Zeit. He lectured at the Carnegie Museum of Natural History, the Bard Graduate Center for Studies in the Decorative Arts and Culture in New York City, the Bancroft Library and the Botanical Garden of the University of California at Berkeley, at the Goethe Institutes of San Francisco and Washington, D.C. and at Deutsches Haus at New York University. Some of his books have been translated into Japanese, Korean, Chinese, Spanish, Italian, French, Russian, Romanian, Greek, Norwegian, Turkish, and Arabic.

In 2016 he was fellow of the Logan Nonfiction Program / Carey Institute for Global Good in New York.

== Bibliography ==
- The Ocean at Home: An Illustrated History of the Aquarium (2005, translated by Ashley Marc Slapp, revised edition 2011)
- Bears: A Brief History (2007, paperback 2008, translated by Lori Lantz)
- Moon: A Brief History (2010, paperback 2011)
- Inventing the Christmas tree (2012, translated by Benjamin A. Smith)
- The Art of Lying Down: A Guide to Horizontal Living (2013, translated by Lori Lantz)
- Nach Amerika: Die Geschichte der deutschen Auswanderung (the history of German emigration to America, 2011, only in German)
- Birdmania: A Remarkable Passion for Birds (2017, translated by Jane Billinghurst)
- Winterlust: Finding Beauty in the Fiercest Season (2019, translated by Mary Catherine Lawler)
- Taming Fruit: How Orchards Have Transformed the Land, Offered Sanctuary, and Inspired Creativity (2021, translated by Lori Lantz)
- Extreme North: A Cultural History (2022, translated by Jefferson Chase)

== See also ==
- Aquarium - extensively references The Ocean at Home
