= Ann Thwaite =

British biographer

Ann Thwaite (born 4 October 1932) is a British writer who is the author of five major biographies. A.A. Milne: His Life was the Whitbread Biography of the Year, 1990. Edmund Gosse: A Literary Landscape (Duff Cooper Prize, 1985) was described by John Carey as "magnificent - one of the finest literary biographies of our time". Glimpses of the Wonderful about the life of Edmund Gosse's father, Philip Henry Gosse, was picked out by D. J. Taylor in The Independent as one of the "Ten Best Biographies" ever. Her biography of Frances Hodgson Burnett was originally published as Waiting for the Party (1974) and reissued in 2020 with the title Beyond the Secret Garden, with a foreword by Jacqueline Wilson. Emily Tennyson, The Poet's Wife (1996) was reissued by Faber Finds for the Tennyson bicentenary in 2009.

== Biography ==
Born in London, Ann Thwaite spent the war years in New Zealand, returning to complete her education at Queen Elizabeth's School For Girls, Barnet, and St Hilda's College, Oxford. She has lived in Tokyo, Benghazi, and Nashville, Tennessee. She has lectured in many countries, but most of her life has been spent as a writer; she eventually settled in Norfolk with her husband, poet Anthony Thwaite (1930–2021). She is an Oxford D.Litt, and a Fellow of the Royal Society of Literature. She is an Honorary Fellow of the University of Roehampton (National Centre for Research into Children's Literature) and has an honorary doctorate from the University of East Anglia.

For forty years, Ann Thwaite wrote children's books, including The Camelthorn Papers (1969), translated into Japanese and Greek, Tracks, a New Zealand story, and a picture book, Gilbert and the Birthday Cake. Jan Mark included her story "Feeding the Cats" in the Oxford Book of Children's Stories (1993). She reviewed children's books for many years, mainly in The Times Literary Supplement, and ran a library for local children in her home.

The Brilliant Career of Winnie-the Pooh, a scrapbook offshoot of her Milne biography, was published on both sides of the Atlantic in 1992. She edited (1968–75) Allsorts, an annual collection that included new work for children by such writers as Michael Frayn, James Fenton, Penelope Lively and William Trevor. My Oxford (1977) contained memories of their time there by writers including John Mortimer, Antonia Fraser, and Martin Amis. Her edition of Portraits from Life is a collection (1991) of Edmund Gosse's essays on his friends, including Henry James, Robert Louis Stevenson, and Thomas Hardy.

In 2009, Ann Thwaite published Passageways: The Story of a New Zealand Family, which was much praised on both sides of the world. All eight of her great-grandparents emigrated to New Zealand in the middle of the nineteenth century, and it was the realisation that she knew so much more about the families of her biographical subjects that made her look into her own family history.

In 2017, a new edition was published of her 1990 biography of A. A. Milne to coincide with the film Goodbye Christopher Robin for which she was a consultant. It appeared with the subtitle A.A. Milne and the Making of Winnie-the-Pooh and had an introduction by Frank Cottrell-Boyce, the screenwriter. In 2018, Goodbye Christopher Robin was translated into Japanese.

In 1990, Christopher Milne wrote to her: "In you my father has found the perfect biographer... I am left with nothing but admiration and happiness."

== Works ==
- A Piece of Parkin: A True Story from the Autobiography of Frances Hodgson Burnett (1980)
- Edmund Gosse: A Literary Landscape, 1849-1928 (1984)
- A. A. Milne: His Life (1990)
- Waiting for the Party: The Life of Frances Hodgson Burnett, 1849-1924 (1991)
- The Ashton Affair (1995) (children's book)
- Emily Tennyson: The Poet's Wife (1996)
- Glimpses of the Wonderful: The Life of Philip Henry Gosse 1810-1888 (2002)
- Passageways: The Story of a New Zealand Family (2009)
