= Philip Henry Gosse =

English naturalist (1810-1888)

Philip Henry Gosse FRS
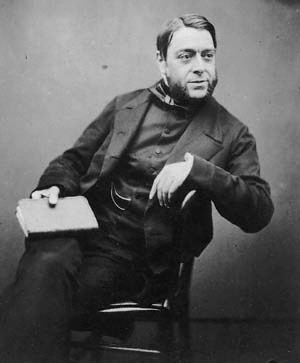
- Gosse in 1855
- Born: 6 April 1810; Worcester, England
- Died: 23 August 1888 (aged 78); Torquay, England
- Known for: Marine biology, aquarium pioneer, Omphalos
- Spouses: Emily Bowes; Eliza Brightwen
- Children: Edmund Gosse
- Scientific career
- Fields: Naturalist
- Author abbrev. (zoology): Gosse

Philip Henry Gosse (/ɡɒs/; 6 April 1810 – 23 August 1888), known to his friends as Henry, was an English naturalist, populariser of natural science, prolific author, "Father of the Aquarium", scientific illustrator, lecturer, entrepreneur and pioneer in the study of marine biology and ornithology. Gosse created and stocked the world's first public marine aquarium at London Zoo in 1853, and coined the term "aquarium". His 1854 work The Aquarium: An Unveiling of the Wonders of the Deep Sea was the catalyst for the aquarium craze in mid-Victorian England. Over thirty years later, Gosse co-authored a three-volume work on Rotifera (microscopic aquatic animals), considered at the time "the most complete and exhaustive history of the Rotifera in any language", with drawings of "extreme minuteness, accuracy, and beauty".

In addition, Gosse was one of the chief figures among Brethren, British evangelical Christians frequently referred to by the misnomer "Plymouth Brethren". For over half of his life, he advanced his religious outlook by lecturing, evangelising, teaching, preaching and watching for the Second Advent, as well as helping to spread the movement across the world.

After his death in 1888, the popular image of Gosse was shaped by his son, Edmund W. Gosse, the poet and critic, in his 1890 Life of Philip Henry Gosse F.R.S. and most notably in his 1907 memoir, Father and Son. In the latter work, among other things, Gosse was portrayed as an overbearing father of uncompromising religious views. Edmund Gosse mythologized the reception given to Gosse’s Omphalos (1857), an attempt to reconcile the geological ages of uniformitarian geology with the biblical account of creation. After new research, most aspects of Edmund Gosse's characterization of his father's life and career in religion and science have been challenged by Douglas Wertheimer in Philip Henry Gosse: A Biography (2024) and elsewhere though the older view persists.

There are three portraits of Gosse at the National Portrait Gallery, London.

== Early life ==
Philip Henry Gosse was born in Worcester in 1810, second of four children of Thomas Gosse (1765–1844), a mezzotint engraver and itinerant painter of miniature portraits, and Hannah (née Best), a lady's maid before her marriage. He spent his childhood mostly in Poole, Dorset, where his aunt, Susan Bell, taught him to draw and introduced him to zoology. She had similarly taught her own son, Thomas Bell, who was 18 years older and later became a great friend to Gosse.

At 15, he began work as a clerk in the counting house of George Garland and Sons in Poole. In 1827 he sailed to Newfoundland to serve as a clerk in the Carbonear premises of Slade, Elson and Co. There, he became a dedicated, self-taught student of Newfoundland entomology, "the first person systematically to investigate and to record the entomology" of the island. While living in Carbonear, he wrote and illustrated an "exquisite" volume, never published, the "Entomologia Terrae Novae". In 1832, Gosse experienced a religious conversion and, as he described it, "solemnly, deliberately and uprightly, took God for my God".

In 1835, he left Newfoundland for Compton, Lower Canada (now Quebec), where he farmed unsuccessfully for three years. He originally tried to establish a commune with two of his religious friends. The experience deepened his love for natural history, and locals referred to him as "that crazy Englishman who goes about picking up bugs". During that time, he became a member of the Natural History Society of Montreal and submitted specimens to its museum.

In 1838 Gosse taught for eight months for Reuben Saffold, the owner of Belvoir plantation, near Pleasant Hill, Alabama. In that period, planters often hired private tutors to teach their children. Gosse also studied the local flora and fauna and drew illustrations of insects in a notebook titled Entomologia Alabamensis that were not published until 2010. The cotton plantation was in the Black Belt of Alabama, and Saffold held numerous enslaved labourers. Gosse recorded his negative impressions of slavery, later published as Letters from Alabama (1859).

== Young naturalist and lay preacher ==
Returning to England in 1839, Gosse was hard pressed to make a living and subsisted on eightpence a day ("one herring eaten as slowly as possible, and a little bread"). His fortunes began to improve when John Van Voorst, the leading publisher of naturalist writing, agreed, on the recommendation of Thomas Bell, to publish his Canadian Naturalist (1840). The book, set as a conversation between a father and his son (Gosse did not yet have a son), was widely praised. It is now considered to demonstrate that Gosse "had a practical grasp of the importance of conservation, far ahead of his time".

Gosse opened a "Classical and Commercial School for Young Gentlemen" while keeping detailed records of his microscopic investigations of pond life, especially cyclopidae and rotifera. He also began to preach to the Wesleyan Methodists and led a Bible class. In 1842, he became so captivated by the doctrine of the Second Coming of Christ that he severed his connection with the Methodists and joined Brethren. Though Dissenters emphasised the Second Coming and rejected liturgy and an ordained ministry although they otherwise endorsed the traditional doctrines of Christianity as represented by the creeds of the Methodist and the Anglican Church.

In 1843, Gosse gave up the school to write An Introduction to Zoology for the Society for Promoting Christian Knowledge (SPCK) and to draw some of the illustrations. Writing the work inspired him to further his interest in the flora and fauna of the seashore. He showed in his book that he was a creationist, which was typical of pre-Darwinian naturalists.

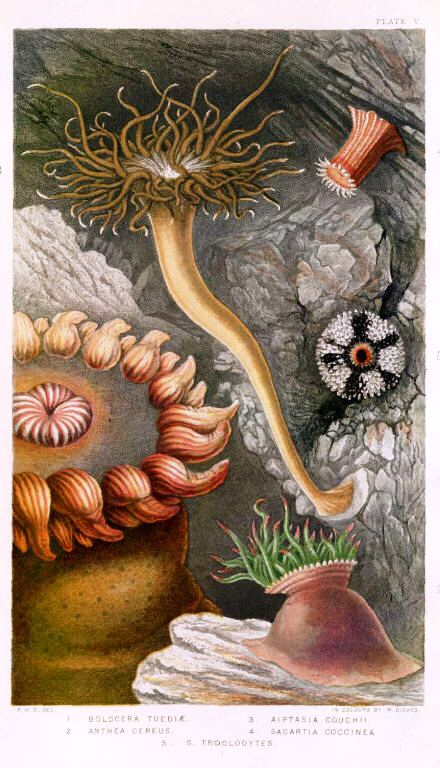
From Philip Henry Gosse, British Sea-Anemones and Corals, 1860.

In October 1844, Gosse went on his own responsibility to Jamaica, where he collected natural history specimens for sale. Although Gosse worked hard during his eighteen months on the island, he later called the period his "'holiday' in Jamaica". Gosse's study covered virtually all aspects of Jamaican natural history, and he left a record as "the Father of Jamaican Ornithology", the "Father of Jamaican Herpetology" and the Father of "many other aspects of Jamaican biology". Gosse lauded the work of Richard Hill, the island's first resident naturalist and ornithologist, and hired black youths as assistants, especially praising Samuel Campbell. For Christian companionship he enjoyed the company of a local Brethren community and their black converts, while remaining in touch with Brethren whom he had met in London.

In the years following his return to London in 1846, Gosse published three works whose achievement remains unsurpassed: Birds of Jamaica (1847), Illustrations of the Birds of Jamaica (1849), and A Naturalist's Sojourn in Jamaica (1851).

== Popular nature writer ==
Back in England, Gosse wrote books on religion-related and scientific subjects, including the first of his books on Bible lands, Monuments of Ancient Egypt (1847), as well as a History of the Jews(1851), both written for the Society for Promoting Christian Knowledge. As his financial situation stabilized, Gosse courted Emily Bowes, a 41-year-old member of the Brethren, who was both a strong personality and a gifted writer of evangelical tracts. They married in November 1848, and their union was an extremely happy one. As D. J. Taylor has written, "the word 'uxorious' seems to have been minted to define" Gosse. Gosse's only son was born on 21 September 1849. Gosse noted the event in his diary with the words: "E. delivered of a son. Received green swallow from Jamaica"—an amusing conjunction which Edmund later described as demonstrating only the order of events: the boy had arrived first.

Gosse wrote a succession of books and articles on natural history, some of which were (in his own words) "pot-boilers" for religious publications. (At the time, accounts of God's creation were considered appropriate Sabbath reading for children.) As L. C. Croft wrote:

"Much of Gosse's success was due to the fact that he was essentially a field naturalist who was able to impart to his readers something of the thrill of studying living animals at first hand rather than the dead disjointed ones of the museum shelf. In addition to this he was a skilled scientific draughtsman who was able to illustrate his books himself".

Suffering from headaches, perhaps the result of overwork, Gosse began with his family to spend more time away from London on the Devon coast. There, along the sea shore, Gosse began serious experimentation with ways to sustain sea creatures so that they could be examined "without diving to gaze on them". He constructed and stocked the first marine aquarium and first public aquarium,in the world in 1853 in London. Although there had been attempts to construct what had previously been called an "aquatic vivarium" (a name Gosse found "awkward and uncouth"), Gosse published The Aquarium in 1854 and set off a mid-Victorian craze for household aquariums. The book was financially profitable for Gosse, and "the reviews were full of praise". Even in that work, Gosse used natural science to point to the necessity of salvation through the blood of Christ. In 1856 Gosse was elected a Fellow of the Royal Society, which, because he had no university position or inherited wealth, gave him "a standing he otherwise lacked".

A few months before Gosse was honoured, his wife discovered that she had breast cancer. Rather than undergo surgery (a risky procedure in 1856), the Gosses decided to submit to the ointments of an American doctor, Jesse Weldon Fell, who, if not a charlatan, was certainly on the fringe of contemporary medical practice. After much suffering, Emily Gosse died on 9 February 1857. She entrusted her husband with their son's salvation, and perhaps her death drove Gosse into his "strange severities and eccentric prohibitions". In 1857, Philip Henry Gosse published A Memorial of the Last Days on Earth of Emily Gosse by Her Husband Philip Henry Gosse, FRS.

== Prophetic and religious writer ==
Prior to 1842, Christian eschatalogical systems were not a major concern to Gosse. He was familiar with works on unfulfilled prophecy but had no particular position on the subject. In June of that year, he was given a copy of Dissertation on the Prophetic Scriptures, by Matthew Habershon, an Historic premillenialist. The school of prophecy which Habershon represented interpreted past and contemporary events as having occurred and were still occurring as foretold in Scripture. The interpretative mode stood in distinction to the Futurist school, which maintained that Scripture predictions had a future literal realization at end times. Gosse recalled being "so wholly absorbed" in reading Habershon’s book that he finished all 400 pages in one sitting. He henceforth committed to a belief in historical premillennialism, which was then enjoying an unprecedented following among Christians. Like others who shared that position, his outlook was influenced by the anticipation of numerous dates for the Second Advent between 1843 and 1881.

As a defender of Historicism, Gosse clashed throughout his life with advocates of Futurism. His major publications on unfulfilled prophecy were critiques of Futurism – The Revelation: How is it to be interpreted? (1866) and an 1870 series of 24 articles in R.C. Morgan’s prominent weekly The Christian. Gosse also challenged J. N. Darby’s dispensationalist hermeneutic.

Among Gosse’s religious (and religion-related) writings were six books, eight pamphlets, 69 articles, and six evangelistic tracts. Gosse contributed to over three dozen serials, many of which were evangelical, including The Christian, Good Words, Quarterly Journal of Prophecy, The Rainbow, and The Weekly Visitor. Between 1847 and 1852 Gosse published four books on bible lands. Sacred Streams: the History of the Rivers Mentioned in Holy Scriptures (1850) was the most successful, with editions published in Britain until 1883, and the USA until about 1877. He authored six evangelistic tracts between 1859 and 1861, collected in a volume with other tracts by his wife, Emily. That work obtained an aggregate sale of at least seven million.

== Omphalos ==
The often-repeated narrative about the events leading up to the publication of Omphalos, the analysis of the work and the response to it, all based upon the writings of Edmund Gosse, are as follows. In the months following Emily's death, Gosse worked with remarkable diligence on a book that he may have viewed as the most important of his career. Although a failure both financially and intellectually, it is the book by which he is best remembered. Gosse believed that he had discovered a theory that might neatly resolve the seeming contradiction in the age of the earth between the evidence of God's Word and the evidence of His creation, as expounded by such contemporary geologists as Charles Lyell. In 1857, two years before the publication of Charles Darwin's Origin of Species, Gosse published Omphalos: An Attempt to Untie the Geological Knot and thereby created what has been called the Omphalos hypothesis.

In what Stephen Jay Gould has called "gloriously purple prose", Gosse argued that if one assumed creation ex nihilo, there would necessarily be traces of previous existence that had never actually occurred. "Omphalos" is Greek for "navel", and Gosse argued that the first man, Adam, did not require a navel because he was never born but that he must have had one, like all other complete human beings, just as God must have created trees with rings that they never grew. Thus, Gosse argued that the fossil record, even coprolites, might also be evidence of life that had never actually existed but that may have been instantly formed by God at the moment of creation.

The general response was "as the Westminster Review put it, that Gosse's theory was 'too monstrous for belief'". Even his friend, the novelist Charles Kingsley, wrote that he had read "no other book which so staggered and puzzled" him, that he could not believe that God had "written on the rocks one enormous and superfluous lie for all mankind". Journalists later sniggered that God had apparently hidden fossils in the rocks to tempt geologists to infidelity.

Omphalos sold poorly and was eventually rebound with a new title, Creation, "in case the obscure one had had an effect on sales". The problem was not with the title. In 1869 most of the edition was sold as waste paper.

Notwithstanding the universal repetition of Gosse's claims over the years, Douglas Wertheimer has argued that it is possible to dispense "with the myths surrounding Omphalos, its goal and reception". Specifically, he challenges the prevailing explanation for the timing of the book, the subject of the book, its reception and Gosse's goal in writing it.

== Opposition to Gosse ==
In his study of the Royal Society of London in the second half of the 19th century, Andrew John Harrison argued that for well over a dozen years after 1870, Victorian Britain’s premier scientific body was controlled by scientists determined to promote Darwinism and agnostic naturalism. According to Douglas Wertheimer, among those boycotted were the British neurologist H.C. Bastian, the Canadian geologist J.W. Dawson, and Gosse.

Andrew John Harrison asserts that in Gosse’s situation, the snub came the year after the publication of Omphalos, when Gosse submitted a paper for publication to the Royal Society. Douglas Wertheimer provides evidence that it was continued in 1881 (when Gosse submitted research to the Royal Society on Lepidoptera) and again from 1886 to 1889 (when he co-published on Rotifera).

== Later career ==
According to Gosse, his father's career was destroyed by his "strange act of wilfulness" in publishing Omphalos; Edmund claimed his father had "closed the doors upon himself forever". Douglas Wertheimer argues that the claim is disconnected from the facts since Gosse published five natural history books in the four years after Omphalos, three of which were incontrovertible contributions to science.

Just as Omphalos was appearing in 1857, Gosse, his son and their cook moved permanently from London to St Marychurch, Devon. (Gosse refused to use the "St" and even gave his address as Torquay so as not to have anything to do with the "so-called Church of England".) He soon became the pastor and overseer of the Brethren meeting. It was first held in a loft over a stable but shortly, under Gosse's preaching and peacemaking, in finer quarters, which he perhaps financed himself. His son said that his father "soon lost confidence in the Plymouth Brethren also, and for the last thirty years of his life he was really unconnected with any Christian body whatsoever". In fact, Gosse was aligned for over 45 years with Brethren.

During this period, Gosse made a special study of sea anemones (Actiniae) and in 1860 published Actinologia Britannica. Reviewers especially praised the colour lithographs made from Gosse's watercolours. The Literary Gazette said that Gosse now stood "alone and unrivalled in the extremely difficult art of drawing objects of zoology so as to satisfy the requirements of science" as well as providing "vivid aesthetic impressions".

In 1860, Gosse married Eliza Brightwen (1813–1900), apparently of Quaker background but already familiar with Brethren ways, who shared Gosse's intense interest in both natural history and the well-being of his son. Gosse's second marriage was as happy as his first. In 1881 he wrote that Eliza was "a true yoke-fellow, in love, in spirit and in service".

By this time, Gosse was "very comfortably off" with the earnings from his books and dividends from his investments. In 1864 Eliza received a substantial legacy that allowed Gosse to retire from his career as a professional writer and live in "congenial obscurity". The Gosses lived simply, invested some of their income and gave more away to charity, especially to foreign missionaries, including ones sent to the "Popish, priest-ridden Irish".

To Gosse's disappointment, his son turned his back on his Brethren upbringing though not as early or as dramatically as Edmund portrayed the break in Father and Son. But Gosse sponsored the publication of Edmund's early poetry, which gave the younger man entrée to new friends of literary importance, and the two men "came out of the years of conflict with their relationship wary but intact". Henry and Eliza welcomed Edmund's wife to the family and enjoyed visits with their three grandchildren.

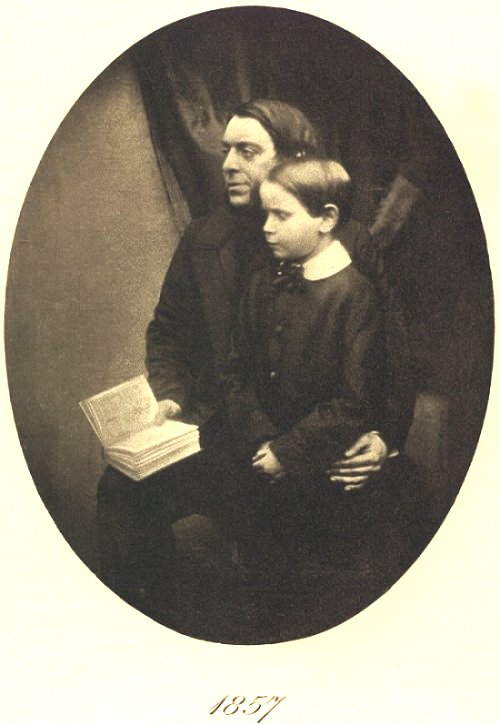
Philip Henry Gosse and his son Edmund Gosse, 1857. Frontispiece of Father and Son.

Meanwhile, the ever active Gosse had taken up the study of orchids and exchanged a number of letters on the subject with Darwin, though he never published on this subject himself. His penultimate enthusiasm was with the genitalia of butterflies about which he published a paper in the Transactions of the Linnean Society, Gosse hoped in studying those two areas to scientifically challenge, if not disprove, overthrown Darwin's theory. In the last years of his life, he collaborated with the microscopist Charles Thomas Hudson on a landmark, classic three-volume monograph on Rotifera, containing illustrations by both authors. The work, however, was boycotted by Britain's community of scientific naturalists.

According to Eliza Gosse, her husband's final illness may have been caused by his becoming chilled while he was trying to adjust his telescope at an open window on a winter night. Gosse had prayed over the years that he might not taste death but meet Christ in the air at his Second Coming, and he was allegedly bitterly disappointed when he realised that he would die like everyone else. There are at least five other accounts of aspects of Gosse's death, which differ in detail.

== Father and Son ==
After his father's death, Edmund Gosse published a typical Victorian biography, The Life of Philip Henry Gosse (1890). After reading it, the writer George Moore suggested to Edmund that it contained "the germ of a great book". Edmund Gosse revised his material and first published his notable memoir anonymously as Father and Son in 1907. It has never gone out of print. The reaction of readers to Henry's personality and character, as represented in Father and Son, has included phrases such as "scientific crackpot", "bible-soaked romantic", "a stern and repressive father" and a "pulpit-thumping Puritan throwback to the seventeenth century".

A modern editor of Father and Son has rejected that portrait of Philip Henry Gosse on the grounds that his own "writings reveal a genuinely sweet character". Ann Thwaite, the biographer of both Gosses, has established just how inaccurate Edmund's recollections of his childhood were. Henry James remarked that Edmund Gosse had "a genius for inaccuracy". Although Edmund went out of his way to declare that the story of Father and Son was "scrupulously true", Thwaite cites a dozen occasions on which Edmund's "memory betray[ed] him (he admitted it was 'like a colander')", or he "changed things deliberately to make a better story". Thwaite argues that Edmund could only preserve his self-respect, in comparison to his father's superior abilities, by demolishing the latter's character. Nearly a century after Gosse's death, a study based on his published remarks and writings about his father concluded that in varying degrees, they are "riddled with error, distortion, contradictions, unwarranted claims, misrepresentation, abuse of the written record, and unfamiliarity with the subject".

== In popular culture ==
Dennis Potter adapted Father and Son as the television play Where Adam Stood, first broadcast on BBC One in 1976. Gosse was played by Alan Badel.

Father and Son was also adapted for BBC Radio 4 in 2005 by Nick Warburton. Roger Allam played Gosse and Derek Jacobi played Edmund.

Ann Lingard's novel Seaside Pleasures (2014) explores the relationship between Gosse and his wife Emily from the point of view of a female student in his shore-class.

== Commemoration ==
In 2021, a blue plaque was placed at Poole United Reformed Church, where Gosse worshipped as a young boy. In November 2022, a sea-life mural dedicated to Gosse was unveiled in Poole Town Centre.

== Works ==
- The Canadian Naturalist: A Series of Conversations on the Natural History of Lower Canada (1840).
- An Introduction to Zoology (1844).
- The Ocean (1844), edition of 1874 under the title The Wonders of the Great Deep; or, the Physical, Animal, Geological and Vegetable Curiosities of the Ocean.
- The Birds of Jamaica (1847)
- The Monuments of Ancient Egypt, and Their Relation to the Word of God (1847).
- Natural History. Mammalia (1848).
- Popular British Ornithology; Containing a Familiar and Technical Description of the Birds of the British Isles (1849).
- Illustrations of the Birds of Jamaica (1849).
- Natural History. Birds (1849).
- Sacred streams: The Ancient and Modern History of the Rivers of the Bible (1850).
- Natural History. Reptiles (1850).
- A Naturalist's Sojourn in Jamaica (1851).
- Natural History. Fishes (1851).
- The History of the Jews, from the Christian Era to the Dawn of the Reformation (1851).
- A Text-book of Zoology for Schools (1851).
- Assyria: Her Manners and Customs, Arts and Aims. Restored from the Monuments (1852).
- A Naturalist's Rambles on the Devonshire Coast (1853).
- The Aquarium: An Unveiling of the Wonders of the Deep Sea (1854).
- Natural History. Mollusca (1854).
- A Handbook to the Marine Aquarium: Containing Instructions for Constructing, Stocking and Maintaining a Tank, and for Collecting Plants and Animals (1855).
- Manual of Marine Zoology for the British Isles (1855–1856).
- Tenby: A Seaside Holiday (1856).
- A Memorial of the Last Days on Earth of Emily Gosse (1857)
- Omphalos: An Attempt to Untie the Geological Knot (1857, modern editions 1998 and 2003.
- Life in its Lower, Intermediate, and Higher Forms; or, Manifestations of the Divine Wisdom in the Natural History of Animals (1857).
- Actinologia Britannica: A History of the British Sea-Anemones and Corals. (1858–60).
- Evenings at the Microscope: or, Researches Among the Minute Organs and Forms of Animal Life (1859).
- Letters from Alabama, Chiefly Relating to Natural History (1859).
- The Romance of Natural History (1860–61).
- A Year at the Shore (1865).
- Land and Sea (1865)
- The Revelation. How is it to be interpreted ? (1866).
- Imperial Bible-Dictionary (104 articles) (1866)
- The Mysteries of God: A Series of Expositions of Holy Scripture (1884).

== Bibliography ==
- Gosse, Edmund (1890). Naturalist of the Sea Shore, The Life of Philip Henry Gosse. London: William Heinemann.
- Gosse, Edmund, Father and Son (New York: Charles Scribner's Sons, 1907); Oxford World Classics edition, 2004.
- Wertheimer, Douglas (2024). Philip Henry Gosse: A Biography. Brethren Archivists and Historians Network. ISBN 978-1739128326.
- Freeman, R.B. and Douglas Wertheimer (1980), Philip Henry Gosse: A Bibliography. Folkestone, Kent: Dawson.
- Freeman, R. B. and Douglas Wertheimer, “Emily Gosse: A Bibliography”, Brethren Historical Review 17, 2021, 25-78. ISSN 1755-9383.
- Boyd, Robert (2004), Emily Gosse: A Life of Faith and Works : the Story of Her Life and Witness with Her Published Poems and Samples of Her Prose Writings, Olivet Books. ISBN 0-9548283-0-5
- Thwaite, Ann (2002). Glimpses of the Wonderful: The Life of Philip Henry Gosse, 1810-1888. Faber & Faber. ISBN 9781739128326.
- Croft, L.R. (2004), "Gosse, Philip Henry (1810–1888)", Oxford Dictionary of National Biography.
- Wertheimer, Douglas (1982), "Gosse, Philip Henry", Dictionary of Canadian Biography.
- Rendle-Short, John (1998), Green Eye of the Storm (Edinburgh: Banner of Truth Trust).
- Borges, Jorge Luis, "The Creation and P. H. Gosse", in Other Inquisitions (trans. Ruth Simms) (Austin: University of Texas Press, 1964).
- Gould, Stephen Jay (1987), "Adam's Navel", in The Flamingo's Smile: Reflections in Natural History (New York: W. W. Norton).
- Brunner, Bernd (2011), The Ocean at Home: An Illustrated History of the Aquarium (trans. Ashley Marc Slapp). (London: Reaktion Books).
- Wotton, Roger (2012), Walking with Gosse: Natural History, Creation and Religious Conflicts (Southampton: Clio Publishing).
