= 1989 in British television =

This is a list of British television related events from 1989.

== Events ==
=== January ===
- 1 January – The network television premiere of Amadeus on BBC1, Miloš Forman's 1984 biographical drama based on the play of the same name that is a fictionalised biography of Wolfgang Amadeus Mozart.
- 2 January – The network television premieres of Sesame Street Presents: Follow That Bird on BBC1 and the 1985 Madonna-starring film Desperately Seeking Susan on BBC2.
- 5 January – Debut of the sitcom Desmond's, set in a London British Guyanese barber shop, on Channel 4.
- 7 January – The Chart Show moves from Channel 4 to ITV.
- 8 January – The original airdate of the Only Fools and Horses episode "Yuppy Love" featuring the classic scene in which Del Boy falls through a bar. A 2006 poll names the scene as the most popular of the entire series while it is also named 7th Greatest Television Moment of all time in a 1999 Channel 4 poll.
- 9 January – Launch of Central News South, a separate local news service for the South Midlands, covering Oxfordshire, Gloucestershire, Herefordshire and parts of Northamptonshire, Buckinghamshire and Wiltshire. The programme is broadcast from a new computerised news centre in Abingdon.
- 16 January
  - The Late Show, the UK's first daily arts programme, makes its debut on BBC2, presented by Sarah Dunant. It airs directly after Newsnight.
  - Debut of the critically acclaimed children's series Press Gang on ITV, starring Julia Sawalha.
- 20 January – BBC2 airs live coverage of the inauguration of George H. W. Bush as the 41st President of the United States.
- 22 January – ITV launches an omnibus edition of Coronation Street which airs on Sunday afternoons; however, the repeat is not stranded across the network, with different regions airing it at different times. Some regions, including Central, later move the episode to a Saturday afternoon slot and the omnibus is dropped in some areas from September 1990.
- 24 January – BBC1 airs an episode of EastEnders, featuring a mouth-to-mouth gay kiss between the characters Colin Russell (Michael Cashman) and Guido Smith (Nicholas Donovan), the first time such a scene is shown in a British soap. It causes uproar among viewers and in the press.
- 26 January – Debut of the sitcom Joint Account on BBC1.
- 27 January – The US family sitcom Roseanne makes its UK debut on Channel 4, starring Roseanne Barr and John Goodman.
- 28 January
  - The network television premiere of Richard Donner's 1985 adventure comedy The Goonies on ITV, starring Sean Astin, Josh Brolin, Jeff Cohen, Corey Feldman, Kerri Green, Martha Plimpton and Ke Huy Quan.
  - The US drama series Midnight Caller makes its UK debut on BBC1; it is one of the first television shows to address the dramatic possibilities of the growing phenomenon at this time of talk radio.

=== February ===
- 5 February – At 6pm, the world's first commercial DBS system, Sky Television, goes on the air. Three new channels, Sky News, Sky Movies and Eurosport, all launch, as well as the flagship Sky Channel, later renamed Sky One.
- 6 February
  - Launch of the Sky News flagship breakfast programme, Sunrise, which will run until 2019.
  - Sky Channel begins a rerun of its popular Australian medical soap opera series The Young Doctors, starting with the first-ever episode.
- 11 February – The Australian soap Home and Away makes its UK debut on ITV. It is the second networked Australian soap on that channel, following the short-lived Richmond Hill which is still airing during the afternoon. Home and Away is crucially scheduled in early evening slots of either 5:10pm, 6pm or 6:30pm across the ITV network and it immediately becomes the counterpart series to BBC1's Neighbours airing at 5:35pm. This scheduling continues thirty years later with both series now in these same slots but together on Channel 5.
- 12 February – ITV launches its Find a Family campaign to help find permanent homes for youngsters in care.
- 13 February – The first ITV national weather bulletin is broadcast.
- 14 February – Debut of Out on Tuesday on Channel 4, the UK's first weekly magazine series for gay and lesbian viewers. Later changing its name to Out, the show airs for four series before being axed in 1992.
- 15 February – ITV airs the Coronation Street episode in which Brian Tilsley is killed outside a nightclub.
- 18 February – Debut of the children's drama series Woof! on ITV, starring Liza Goddard.
- 23 February – Some 23 million viewers tune in to watch the exit of the hugely popular character Den Watts (Leslie Grantham) from EastEnders. Grantham filmed his final scenes in the show in the autumn of 1988, but his exit has been delayed into 1989 to avoid the show suffering the double blow of losing Den so soon after his former wife, Angie (Anita Dobson), who exited in May 1988. The character falls into a canal after being shot, but the character's exact fate is left unconfirmed. He will make a return to the show in 2003, before being killed off in 2005.
- 24 February – Debut of the children's game show Fun House on Children's ITV, presented by Pat Sharp.
- 25 February – The long-awaited WBA Heavyweight title fight between Britain's Frank Bruno and the USA's Mike Tyson is held at the Hilton Hotel in Las Vegas. Because of the time difference between Britain and the US, the fight is televised in the UK in the early hours of 26 February. Tyson wins after the referee stops the bout in the fifth round.
- 26 February – BBC2 screens Alan Clarke's acclaimed football hooligan drama The Firm, starring Gary Oldman.
- February
  - Channel 4 begins broadcasting in NICAM digital stereo, initially from the Crystal Palace transmitting station in London, prior to a national transmitter-by-transmitter roll-out during 1990.
  - Anglia and Central reschedule Emmerdale Farm to 7pm on Tuesdays and Thursdays.

=== March ===
- 2 March
  - My Brother David, an edition of the BBC2 schools series Scene, is first broadcast in which Simon Scarboro talks about the life of his brother David Scarboro, who originally played the EastEnders character Mark Fowler and who fell to his death from Beachy Head in 1988. The programme is repeated on 19 June for a general audience as part of BBC2's DEF II strand.
  - After much publicity, a two-minute advert for Pepsi featuring Madonna's latest single "Like a Prayer" is shown during a commercial break on ITV, 12 minutes into The Bill.
- 6 March – Debut of the three-part ITV drama Winners and Losers, starring Leslie Grantham. The series is his first post-EastEnders role.
- 9 March – On Top of the Pops, comedian Lenny Henry joins regular presenter Nicky Campbell for a special Comic Relief edition of the programme.
- 10 March – On the second Red Nose Day, BBC1 airs the eight-hour telethon, A Night of Comic Relief 2.
- 15 March
  - BBC1 airs John's Not Mad, an edition of the QED documentary strand that shadows John Davidson, a 15-year-old from Galashiels in Scotland with severe Tourette syndrome. The film explores John's life in terms of his family and the close-knit community around him and how they all cope with a misunderstood condition.
  - Debut of the drama series Children's Ward on Children's ITV.
- 16 March – Debut of the children's sitcom Mike and Angelo on Children's ITV.
- 17 March – Channel 4 launches the Friday night chat show Clive Anderson Talks Back.
- 31 March
  - The last Oracle on View transmission takes place on Channel 4.
  - Night Network is broadcast for the final time on ITV regions that are not taking Granada's Night Time service.
- March
  - The Independent Broadcasting Authority recommends that the headquarters of a fifth channel should be situated outside London, preferably at a location north of Birmingham.
  - The Children's Channel launches free-to-air on Astra 1A, airing from 5am to 10am on weekdays and from 5am to 12pm on weekends, time-sharing with Lifestyle.

=== April ===
- 1 April
  - Five Star appear on CBBC's Going Live! to promote their latest single With Every Heartbeat. During a live phone-in, a teenage caller verbally abuses them and asks why they are "so fucking crap". Presenter Sarah Greene quickly cuts off the call as the tirade continues. On 23 September 2019, an individual claiming to be Eliot Fletcher, the caller, apologises to the band for the incident via a social media account. However, doubt is then cast on the authenticity of the apology after several other people claim to be the notorious caller.
  - Discovery Channel Europe launches. The channel broadcasts via Intelsat and on cable systems.
  - The network television premiere of John G. Avildsen's 1984 martial arts drama The Karate Kid on ITV, starring Ralph Macchio, Pat Morita, Elisabeth Shue, William Zabka, Martin Kove and Chad McQueen.
- 2–3 April – ITV airs The Heroes, an Australian-British television miniseries based on the World War II Operation Jaywick, starring John Bach and Jason Donovan.
- 3 April
  - Production of Children's ITV is taken over by independent producer Stonewall Productions. The strand continues to be broadcast from Central's studios at Broad Street in Birmingham as part of the agreement with a new rotating presenting team of Clive Warren, Jeanne Downs and Jerry Foulkes accompanying the network's puppet Scally the Dog.
  - Channel 4 launches its breakfast television show The Channel Four Daily. The programme is based heavily on news and current affairs, with segments focusing on sports, finance, lifestyles, arts and entertainment and discussion. It is axed in 1992 after failing to gain enough viewers and is subsequently replaced by the much more popular The Big Breakfast.
  - The Australian children's series The Bartons makes its UK debut on BBC1.
- 4 April – TUGS, a children's model animated series made by Clearwater Features (the British company behind the first two series of Thomas the Tank Engine & Friends), makes its debut on Children's ITV. Also on the same day, the final episode of Hill Street Blues is broadcast on Channel 4 for the last time.
- 6 April – Rolf's Cartoon Club, a new series where Rolf Harris guides children through the world of animation, debuts on Children's ITV.
- 8 April
  - As well as launching The Channel Four Daily on weekdays, Channel 4 also begin a weekend service from 6am to 9:25am with some segments from the aforementioned show being repeated as well as repeat showings of children's and education programmes.
  - The US action series MacGyver makes its UK debut on BBC1, starring Richard Dean Anderson.
- 15 April – Hillsborough disaster. The BBC's cameras are at the Hillsborough ground in Sheffield to record the FA Cup semi-final clash between Liverpool and Nottingham Forest for their Match of the Day programme, but as the disaster unfolds, the events are relayed to their live sports show, Grandstand, resulting in the extreme emotional impact on the general British population.
- 20 April – John Leslie becomes the first Scottish presenter of Blue Peter on BBC1.
- 21 April – BBC2's 25th anniversary. Programming includes an edition of Arena in which the author Graham Greene sets out to trace a namesake who posed as him for many years and an edition of The Late Show which looks at the early BBC2 jazz programme Jazz 625.
- 24 April
  - The BBC's Ceefax runs as a partial service only, due to a strike by broadcasting unions.
  - Jon Snow joins Channel 4 News as its main newscaster, replacing Peter Sissons, who had presented the programme since its launch in November 1982.
- 26 April – BBC1 airs A Case of Spontaneous Human Combustion, a Q.E.D. documentary which sets out to investigate apparent instances of the phenomenon of spontaneous human combustion, combustion of the human body without an apparent external source of ignition.
- 27 April – BBC2 airs the 40 Minutes documentary Inside Broadmoor, a film showing life inside Broadmoor Hospital in Berkshire.

=== May ===
- 1 May – The network television premiere of the 1984 science-fiction sequel Star Trek III: The Search for Spock on BBC1, starring William Shatner, Leonard Nimoy and DeForest Kelley.
- 2 May – ITV airs an edition of the First Tuesday documentary strand investigating the My Lai Massacre during the Vietnam War called Four Hours in My Lai which is later shown in the US as part of the Frontline series with the title Remember My Lai.
- 6 May – Yugoslavia's Riva wins the Eurovision Song Contest 1989 (staged in Lausanne) with "Rock Me".
- 15 May – Series 3 of The Cook Report begins with an investigation into the ivory trade.
- 18 May – Channel 4's Treasure Hunt airs its final episode.
- 20 May – Debut of game show That's Showbusiness on BBC1, presented by Mike Smith.
- 26 May
  - The High Court rejects a legal challenge to overturn the prohibition on broadcasting the voices of representatives of Irish terrorist organisations introduced in October 1988 after deciding the Home Secretary acted lawfully. In December, the Appeal Court upholds the ban.
  - ITV airs live the last Football League game of the season, between Liverpool and Arsenal at Anfield. Arsenal win the League title with the last kick of the season, thanks to a late goal from Michael Thomas. More than 8 million people are said to have tuned in.

=== June ===
- 3 June – Sky Television and The Walt Disney Company come to an arrangement which allows Sky to broadcast movies for a five-year period. This agreement comes a few weeks after plans to create a full-time channel were scrapped, although the channel itself eventually launches on 1 October 1995.
- 5 June
  - Huxley Pig, a stop motion television series based on the picture books by Rodney Peppé, debuts on Children's ITV.
  - BBC2 broadcasts a special 90-minute programme Climate in Crisis to mark United Nations' World Environment Day, presented by Michael Buerk and David Attenborough, which predicts the Earth's greatest threats from climate change and sea level rise are already changing the planet with a need to avert catastrophe in the mid-3rd millennium. Studio guests include Sir Shridath Ramphal and Jonathon Porritt with an exclusive interview of HRH Prince Charles voicing his concerns.
  - Channel 4 airs the network television premiere of David Lynch's 1984 science-fiction epic Dune, starring Kyle MacLachlan, Virginia Madsen, Francesca Annis, Max von Sydow, Jürgen Prochnow, Everett McGill, Sean Young, Siân Phillips, José Ferrer, Freddie Jones, Patrick Stewart, Dean Stockwell, Alicia Witt and Sting.
- 19 June – For the first time, BBC2 broadcasts during the morning when not showing Daytime on 2. Programmes begin at 10am as opposed to lunchtime.
- 22 June
  - John Craven presents his final edition of the children's news programme John Craven's Newsround. After his departure, the show continues under the name Newsround.
  - An edition of Question Time looks back at Robin Day's ten years as the show's presenter as he prepares to step down from the role. The edition is presented from the Greenwood Theatre in London, with panellists Michael Foot, Lady Antonia Fraser, Michael Heseltine and David Owen.
  - Debut of the Channel 4 miniseries Traffik, a drama about the illegal drugs trade.
- 23 June – The final episode of the original series of Dynasty is shown on BBC1 which sees Blake Carrington, Alexis Colby, Dex Dexter, and Fallon Carrington Colby stuck in mortal peril.
- 27 June – Tugs airs its final episode on Children's ITV as plans for a second series are scrapped following TVS's bankruptcy.

=== July ===
- 10 July
  - The music magazine series The O-Zone makes its debut on BBC1.
  - On the Channel 4 game show Countdown, the set receives a redesign and Carol Vorderman is promoted to being the show's co-host alongside Richard Whiteley.
- 12 July – A special edition of Question Time from Paris, France, is the last to be chaired by Robin Day. Panellists on the programme are Leon Brittan, Chantal Cuer, Denis Healey and Yvette Roudy.
- 15 July – during an edition of the CBBC Saturday morning show UP2U from that year's Royal Tournament, Anthea Turner was injured when a pyrotechnic display exploded in her face whilst she was giving a piece to camera during a motorcycle stunt.
- 17 July - ITV introduces a second daily airing of Home and Away shown at 11:00am as part of Children's ITV summer holiday morning schedule. It would move to 12:30pm on 4 September.
- 19 July
  - Debut of the game show Interceptor on ITV, hosted by former tennis player and Treasure Hunt sky-runner Annabel Croft with the eponymous Interceptor played by actor Sean O'Kane. The series will run for seven episodes until it ends on 1 January 1990 with a New Year special.
  - The BBC documentary series Panorama accuses Shirley Porter, Conservative Leader of Westminster City Council, of gerrymandering.
- 25 July – ITV airs "Don't Like Mondays", an episode of The Bill, featuring a storyline in which several characters are caught up in a bank robbery. The episode sees the exit of PC Pete Ramsey, played by Nick Reding, who is shot in the chest by one of the robbers while protecting a colleague. The fate of the character is left unresolved.
- 28 July – London Weekend Television's current affairs programme Friday Now! is axed after ten months on air due to poor ratings. From the Autumn, it is replaced by Six O'Clock Live.
- 31 July
  - Sky Channel is rebranded as Sky One and confines its broadcasting to the UK and Ireland.
  - Satellite subscription movie channel Premiere ceases broadcasting due to losses of around £10 million and increased competition from Sky Movies. It thanks the viewers as well as a few businesses that helped with the channel's transmission.

=== August ===
- 2 August – The US animated series Garfield and Friends, based on the comic strip Garfield makes its UK debut on Children's ITV.
- 18–20 August – Michael Aspel presents Murder Weekend, a five-part televised murder mystery series for ITV. The show, devised and written by Joy Swift, sees celebrities attempting to solve a murder, with viewers also invited to identify the suspect.
- 25 August – Rupert Murdoch delivers the MacTaggart Memorial Lecture at the Edinburgh International Television Festival in which he launches an attack on the narrow elitism within the British television industry.^{[36]}
- 26 August – ITV airs Michael Lindsay-Hogg's science-fiction mystery television movie Murder on the Moon, starring Brigitte Nielsen, Julian Sands, Gerald McRaney, Jane Lapotaire, Celia Imrie and Brian Cox. It focuses on American and Soviet mining companies teaming up with several human settlements to exploit the satellite's resources for survival as investigators from NASA and KGB are forced to solve a case together.
- 27 August
  - The first Marcopolo Satellite, which will serve as a platform for British Satellite Broadcasting, launches.
  - ITV airs Don Boyd's biographical television movie Goldeneye, starring Charles Dance as Ian Fleming, which focuses about the life of the James Bond author, not to be confused with a later film version of the same name.
- 28 August
  - The network television premiere of Ron Howard's 1985 American science-fiction drama Cocoon on ITV, starring Don Ameche, Wilford Brimley, Hume Cronyn, Brian Dennehy, Steve Guttenberg and Jessica Tandy.
  - BBC1 airs News '39, a week of news-style programmes hosted by Sue Lawley, marking the 50th anniversary of the start of World War II. Each edition is presented in news format reporting on events as if they are occurring in the present time. The bulletin ends on 3 September.

=== September ===
- 1 September
  - The first ITV generic look is introduced.
  - Launch of London Weekend Television's Friday evening news magazine programme Six O'Clock Live.
- 3 September
  - The Disney Club airs for the first time on Children's ITV. Produced by Scottish Television it is broadcast on Sundays at 9:25am and runs mainly between September and April.
  - BBC1 airs the television film Bomber Harris, a drama based on the life of Arthur Harris and starring John Thaw in the eponymous role.
- 5 September – Carol Smillie makes her debut as hostess on ITV's Wheel of Fortune, replacing Angela Ekaette.
- 8 September – Debut of Challenge Anneka on BBC1, presented by Anneka Rice.
- 10 September – BBC1 launches Screen One, an anthology of one-off dramas. The first film is One Way Out, directed by Mick Ford and starring Bob Peck, Denis Lawson, Samantha Bond and Enn Reitel.
- 11 September – NICAM stereo broadcasting launches with stereo programming beginning on ITV and Channel 4 from the Crystal Palace and Emley Moor transmitters and their relays.
- 13 September
  - The BBC is accused of censorship after banning an interview with Simon Hayward, a former Captain of the Life Guards who spent several years in a Swedish prison after a drug smuggling conviction, just hours before he is due to appear on the Wogan show. The decision, taken by BBC1 Controller Jonathan Powell followed protests from several MPs. The BBC says the subject is not appropriate for a family programme, but will be discussed on other shows.
  - Debut of the children's series Bodger & Badger on BBC1, starring Andy Cunningham.
- 14 September
  - Peter Sissons takes over as the presenter of Question Time as the series returns after its Summer break.
  - The children's stop-motion animated series Postman Pat makes its debut in Ireland on Network 2 as part of Dempsey's Den. The animated series The Adventures of Spot also begins airing in Ireland on this day with an Irish language dub called Echtrai Bhrain.
  - The third and final programme in the trilogy to be produced by Maddocks Cartoon Productions, Penny Crayon, debuts on BBC1.
  - The Poddington Peas also debuts on BBC1.
- 15 September – Ceefax AM is broadcast for the final time.
- 25 September – BBC2 airs The Interrogation of John, Malcolm McKay's 1987 ScreenPlay, starring Dennis Quilley, Bill Paterson and Michael Fitzgerald. The film, about the police questioning of a murder suspect and first shown in 1987, now forms the first of a three-part series titled A Wanted Man which further develops the story. The second part of the trilogy, The Secret, airs on 27 September, while Shoreland concludes the series on 28 September.
- 26 September – Debut of Capital City, a drama series about investment bankers produced by Euston Films for Thames on ITV. Thames has spent an estimated £500,000 to run newspaper and billboard advertisements to promote the series launch, believed at the time to be the largest advertising spend for a programme in the history of ITV. Full-page advertisements are taken in six national newspapers including the Financial Times, The Times and The Independent, promoting Shane-Longman, the fictitious company of the series and featuring images of cast members in character.
- 28 September
  - Sybil Ruscoe and Jenny Powell are the first female duo to present Top of the Pops on BBC1.
  - BBC1 debuts Blackadder Goes Forth, the final instalment of this saga, is set in 1917 on the Western Front in the trenches during World War I, with Rowan Atkinson reprising his role once again as Captain Edmund Blackadder.

=== October ===
- 1 October
  - The largest entertainment company in Britain, HIT Entertainment, which was originally a Jim Henson production company called Henson International Television, launches. They specialise in acquiring rights and distributing television series for children such as Thomas & Friends, Bob the Builder, Barney & Friends, Fireman Sam, Pingu, Angelina Ballerina and The Wiggles.
  - BBC2 airs the network television premiere of Birdy, Alan Parker's 1984 drama which is based on William Wharton's 1978 novel of the same name starring Matthew Modine and Nicolas Cage, with the soundtrack score by former Genesis frontman Peter Gabriel.
- 2 October
  - Launch of RTL Veronique, a Dutch private commercial television station broadcasting from Luxembourg. The channel airs to Europe via the Astra satellite and attracts attention in its early days due to its late-night lineup of erotic programmes. The station changes its name to RTL 4 in 1991.
  - Breakfast Time is relaunched as Breakfast News on BBC1.
- 4 October – Jeremy Paxman makes his first regular appearance as presenter of BBC2's Newsnight. He will be in this role until 2014.
- 11 October
  - Debut of Around the World in 80 Days on BBC1, a seven-part series in which Michael Palin circumnavigates the world following the route taken by Jules Verne's fictional character Phileas Fogg. The series concludes on 22 November.
  - Launch of the second generation of the Rover 200. Part of its promotion includes an advert in which a man halts his lover's wedding to someone else before the pair drive off together in that car, accompanied by the track "Up Where We Belong".
- 16 October – Debut of the sitcom Birds of a Feather on BBC1, starring Pauline Quirke, Linda Robson and Lesley Joseph.
- 20 October – ITV introduces a third weekly episode of Coronation Street which airs on Fridays at 7:30pm.
- 29 October – Prime Minister Margaret Thatcher appears on ITV's The Walden Interview with Brian Walden. His tough stance with her during the programme is one of the things that helps to contribute to her downfall the following year.

=== November ===
- 1 November
  - Kylie Minogue make her last appearance on UK TV as Charlene Robinson in BBC1's Neighbours until the 2022 finale.
  - ITV airs One Day in the Life of Television, a documentary filmed by 50 camera crews looking behind-the-scenes of British television on 1 November 1988.
- 2 November
  - The children's series The Riddlers makes its debut on ITV.
  - The last episode of Blackadder Goes Forth, Goodbyeee, is broadcast on BBC1. With one of the most moving endings ever seen on British television, it is aired nine days before Remembrance Day. The final scene is also voted the ninth most memorable moment of all time in a poll for The Observer and Channel 4 on 11 September 1999.
- 7 November – MTV Europe broadcasts a live programme from East Berlin from hotels and conference centres that have given access to the channel for the first time, two days before the fall of the Berlin Wall, paving the way for German reunification.
- 8 November – The teenage drama series Byker Grove makes its debut on BBC1.
- 9 November – The last episode of the soap Emmerdale Farm airs under its original title.
- 14 November – The long-running soap Emmerdale Farm changes its name after 17 years by dropping the word Farm and becoming plain Emmerdale.
- 16 November – Debut of Tony Robinson's children's comedy series Maid Marian and Her Merry Men on BBC1.
- 19 November–26 November – Prince Caspian becomes the second Narnia book to be aired as a television serial on BBC1 in two parts.
- 20 November – The Ceefax service is relaunched to focus on news, sport and current affairs. The magazine elements are significantly reduced and are mainly restricted to the weekend.
- 20–24 November – TVS pilots a 30-minute late-night edition of its news programme Coast to Coast called Coast to Coast Late.
- 21 November – Television coverage of proceedings in the House of Commons begins.
- 22 November
  - Following the commencement of televised coverage of the House of Commons the previous day, BBC2 launches a breakfast round-up of yesterday's proceedings. This is preceded by the 8am bulletin from Breakfast News. Previously, the only BBC2 breakfast output was programmes from The Open University. Their programmes continue to be shown on BBC2 at breakfast, but in an earlier timeslot.
  - The Stone Roses are invited to appear on BBC2's The Late Show. During their performance, the electricity is cut off by noise limiting circuitry, prompting singer Ian Brown to shout "Amateurs, amateurs" as presenter Tracey MacLeod tries to link into the next item.
- 25 November – Helen Sharman is selected as the first Britain to travel into space in a live programme aired by ITV. She is one of 13,000 people to apply for the chance to become an astronaut after responding to a radio advertisement, and journeys to the Mir space station in 1991.
- 26 November – BBC1 debuts The Ginger Tree, a four-part television adaptation of Oswald Wynd's 1977 novel of the same name starring Samantha Bond, Daisuke Ryu and Adrian Rawlins. The serial ends on 17 December.
- 29 November – Debut of four-part serial Blackeyes on BBC2 which is written and directed by Dennis Potter, adapted from his novel of the same name, starring Gina Bellman as an attractive model with Michael Gough in a key role as her uncle. The series theme is described as the objectification of "young and attractive women as consumer goods in a way that brutalizes both sexes". The serial continues on 20 December.

=== December ===
- December – The controversial Broadcasting Bill is introduced into Parliament by the Government. It will pave the way for the deregulation of commercial television.
- 3 December – The Voyage of the Dawn Treader, another Narnia story, is aired as a four-part serial on BBC1. The serial continues on 24 December.
- 4 December – ITV airs the 3000th episode of Coronation Street.
- 6 December
  - The last episode of the 26-year original run of Doctor Who, part three of Survival, is broadcast on BBC1. The long-running show will be off the air for 16 years until it is revived in 2005 with the only new material during this time being an American telemovie in 1996.
  - The first terrestrial television showing of Stanley Kubrick's 1980 psychological horror classic The Shining on ITV, based on Stephen King's 1977 novel of the same name starring Jack Nicholson, Shelley Duvall, Scatman Crothers and Danny Lloyd. This is the American theatrical cut of the film, running 25 minutes longer than the version previously released in the UK.
- 8 December – Alan Bradley (Mark Eden) is fatally run over by a Blackpool tram on Coronation Street, getting the soap's biggest ever audience at almost 27 million viewers, a record that will remain more than 35 years later.
- 11 December – Debut of The Art of Landscape on Channel 4, a programme that shows slowly changing sceneries, animations and landscapes accompanied by music. Initially lasting for three hours, it is broadcast throughout the morning when ITV Schools is off air; from March 1990, the slot is reduced to 30 minutes and airs prior to The Channel Four Daily. After disappearing from the schedule in early 1991, it makes a one-off return in August 1997.
- 17 December – The network television premiere of John Hughes' 1985 American fantasy comedy Weird Science on BBC2, starring Anthony Michael Hall, Ilan Mitchell-Smith, Kelly LeBrock and Bill Paxton.
- 24 December
  - ITV shows the 1984 made-for-television version of A Christmas Carol, starring George C Scott.
  - The network television premiere of the ghost story The Woman in Black on ITV, based on Susan Hill's acclaimed novella.
  - The network television premiere of Jim Henson's 1986 fantasy adventure Labyrinth on BBC1, starring David Bowie and Jennifer Connelly.
  - The iconic British Airways "face" advertisement is first aired. It has been made by advertising firm Saatchi & Saatchi, having been written by Graham Fink and Jeremy Clarke, with Hugh Hudson as director. It is often considered to be a television commercial classic.
- 25 December
  - Christmas Day highlights on BBC1 include Noel's Christmas Presents, presented live by Noel Edmonds. The network television premiere of the 1986 Paul Hogan starring smash hit comedy film Crocodile Dundee, which is watched by over 21 million viewers. The eighth Christmas special of Only Fools and Horses, also attracts huge viewing figures of over 20 million. The John Cleese comedy film Clockwise is also shown later that evening.
  - Christmas Day highlights on ITV include the network television premieres of The BFG and Down and Out in Beverly Hills.
  - The children's series Playbus is renamed Playdays. The show's name is changed after the BBC received a complaint from the National Playbus Association.
- 26 December – Boxing Day highlights on ITV include the network television premieres of the blockbuster 1983 Star Wars sequel Return of the Jedi, starring Mark Hamill, Harrison Ford and Carrie Fisher, as well as the 1973 Disney animated version of Robin Hood and the 1986 comedy Ruthless People starring Danny DeVito.
- 28 December – Paul Gambaccini guest presents a special end-of-decade edition of Top of the Pops with Mike Read.
- 29 December – Deirdre Barlow (Anne Kirkbride) confronts her husband Ken (William Roache) on Coronation Street before throwing him out, ending their decade-long television marriage.
- 31 December
  - The network television premiere of Peter Yates' 1983 British/American science-fiction fantasy adventure Krull on BBC1, starring Kenneth Marshall, Lysette Anthony, Freddie Jones, Francesca Annis, Alun Armstrong, David Battley, Bernard Bresslaw, Robbie Coltrane and Liam Neeson.
  - BBC1 says goodbye to the 1980s with Clive James on the 80s, a special two-hour programme reviewing the decade.
  - BBC2 has its own review of the 1980s, with The Late Show Eighties, featuring highlights of 1980s rock music.
  - The animated special Granpa, based on the book by veteran English children's author and illustrator John Burningham and produced by John Coates and directed by Dianne Jackson (best known for working on the animated Christmas special The Snowman) is shown on Channel 4 at 6:30pm.

== Debuts ==
=== BBC1 ===
- 2 January – Precious Bane (1989)
- 3 January – Greenclaws (1989–1990)
- 4 January – Tom's Midnight Garden (1989)
- 5 January – Dooby Duck's Disco Bus (1989–1992)
- 6 January – Making Out (1989–1991)
- 22 January – Campion (1989–1990)
- 26 January – Joint Account (1989–1990)
- 28 January – Midnight Caller (1988–1991)
- 15 February – The Country Boy (1989)
- 19 February – Laura and Disorder (1989)
- 9 March – A Touch of Spice (1989)
- 2 April – May to December (1989–1994)
- 3 April – The Bartons (1988)
- 6 April – Tricky Business (1989–1991)
- 7 April – The Justice Game (1989–1990)
- 8 April – MacGyver (1985–1992, 2016–2021)
- 2 May – Take Me Home (1989)
- 12 May – Jumping the Queue (1989)
- 20 May – That's Showbusiness (1989–1996)
- 9 July – Chelworth (1989)
- 8 September – Challenge Anneka (1989–1995, 2006)
- 9 September – Saturday Matters with Sue Lawley (1989)
- 10 September – Screen One (1989–1998)
- 13 September
  - Bodger & Badger (1989–1999)
  - Fantastic Max (1988–1990)
- 14 September
  - The Poddington Peas (1989)
  - Penny Crayon (1989–1990)
  - Clockwise (1989–1991)
- 19 September – The Paradise Club (1989–1990)
- 28 September – Blackadder Goes Forth (1989)
- 2 October – Breakfast News (1989–2000)
- 5 October – Bluebirds (1989)
- 11 October – Around the World in 80 Days (1989)
- 16 October – Birds of a Feather (1989–1998 BBC, 2014–2020 ITV)
- 29 October – Mother Love (1989)
- 6 November – Happy Families (1989–1990)
- 8 November – Byker Grove (1989–2006)
- 16 November
  - Maid Marian and Her Merry Men (1989–1994)
  - Victoria Wood (1989)
- 19 November – Prince Caspian/The Voyage of the Dawn Treader (1989)
- 26 November – The Ginger Tree (1989)
- 25 December – Noel's Christmas Presents (1989–1999)
- 28 December – The New Yogi Bear Show (1988)
- 29 December – Commercial Breakdown (1989–2008)

=== BBC2 ===
- 3 January – Greenclaws (1989–1990)
- 4 January – The Dark Angel (1989)
- 13 January – A Bit of Fry & Laurie (1989–1995)
- 1 March – Shadow of the Noose (1989)
- 3 April – Chris and Crumble (1989)
- 26 April – Shalom Salaam (1989)
- 12 May – KYTV (1989–1993)
- 19 May – Tygo Road (1989–1990)
- 9 June – I, Lovett (1989–1993)
- 16 June – Mornin' Sarge (1989)
- 10 July – The O-Zone (1989–2000)
- 19 September – Look and Read: Through the Dragon's Eye (1989)
- 4 October – Nice Work (1989)
- 22 October – The Smoggies (1988–1991)
- 1 November – Summer's Lease (1989)
- 29 November – Blackeyes (1989)
- 31 December – The Late Show (1989–1995)

=== ITV ===
- 5 January – Cinemattractions (1989–1992)
- 6 January
  - Round the Bend (1989–1991)
  - Hot Dog (1989–1991)
  - High Street Blues (1989)
- 7 January – Superboy (1988–1992)
- 8 January – Agatha Christie's Poirot (1989–2013)
- 13 January – A Bit of a Do (1989)
- 16 January – Press Gang (1989–1993)
- 25 January – Young Charlie Chaplin (1989)
- 8 February – Flying Squad (1989–1990)
- 11 February – Home and Away (1988–present)
- 12 February – Find a Family (1989–1991)
- 15 February – Mr. Fixit (1989)
- 18 February – Woof! (1989–1997)
- 21 February – Hitman (1989)
- 24 February
  - Fun House (1989–1999)
  - A Quiet Conspiracy (1989)
- 26 February
  - Forever Green (1989–1992)
  - Forever Knight (1989–1992)
- 6 March – Winners and Losers (1989)
- 13 March
  - The Labours of Erica (1989–1990)
  - Keynotes (1989–1992)
- 15 March
  - EMU-TV (1989)
  - Children's Ward (1989–2000)
- 16 March – Mike and Angelo (1989–2000)
- 21 March – Bradley (1989)
- 1 April
  - Ghost Train (1989–1991)
  - Saturday Night at the Movies (1989–1990)
- 2 April – The Heroes (1989)
- 4 April – TUGS (1989)
- 6 April – Rolf's Cartoon Club (1989–1993)
- 9 April
  - Tanamera – Lion of Singapore (1989)
  - Capstick's Law (1989)
- 12 April – No Strings (1989)
- 14 April
  - Windfalls (1989)
  - Grim Tales (1989–1991)
  - Surgical Spirit (1989–1995)
- 17 April – When Will I Be Famous? (1989)
- 24 April – Murderers Among Us: The Simon Wiesenthal Story (1989)
- 2 May – The Bubblegum Brigade (1989)
- 20 May – Brian Conley: This Way Up (1989–1990)
- 21 May – A Tale of Two Cities (1989)
- 26 May – Sob Sisters (1989)
- 3 June – Young, Gifted and Broke (1989)
- 5 June
  - The Nineteenth Hole (1989)
  - Huxley Pig (1989–1990)
- 6 June – Sounds Like Music (1989–1990)
- 7 June
  - Everybody's Equal (1989–1991)
  - Split Ends (1989)
- 11 June
  - We Are Seven (1989–1991)
  - Tales of Sherwood Forest (1989)
- 12 June – Rules of Engagement (1989)
- 16 June – After the War (1989)
- 5 July – Bangers and Mash (1989)
- 11 July – Somewhere to Run (1989)
- 19 July – Interceptor (1989–1990)
- 23 July – Back Home (1989)
- 26 July – Anything More Would Be Greedy (1989)
- 2 August – Garfield and Friends (1988–1994)
- 18 August – Murder Weekend (1989)
- 20 August – The Fifteen Streets (1989)
- 27 August – Goldeneye (1989)
- 2 September – Saracen (1989)
- 5 September – French Fields (1989–1991)
- 10 September – It's Stardust (1989–1990)
- 13 September – The Best of Magic (1989–1990)
- 15 September – Act of Will (1989)
- 25 September – Streetwise (1989–1992)
- 26 September – Capital City (1989–1990)
- 27 September – Wisdom of the Gnomes (1987–1988)
- 1 October – Close to Home (1989–1990)
- 4 October
  - Take the Plunge (1989)
  - Confessional (1989)
- 8 October – Goals on Sunday (1989–1992)
- 2 November – The Riddlers (1989–1998)
- 6 November – About Face (1989–1991)
- 8 November – The Free Frenchman (1989)
- 15 November – All Change (1989–1991)
- 2 December – Frederick Forsyth Presents (1989–1990)
- 8 December – Stay Lucky (1989–1993)
- 21 December – The Shell Seekers (1989)
- 24 December – The Woman in Black (1989)
- 25 December – The BFG (1989)
- 26 December – K.T.V (1989–1992)
- 27 December – Till We Meet Again (1989)
- 28 December – The Tailor of Gloucester (1989)
- Unknown
  - Satellite City (1988)

=== Channel 4 ===
- 1 January – The Dog It Was That Died (1989)
- 5 January – Desmond's (1989–1994)
- 17 March – Clive Anderson Talks Back (1989–1996)
- 18 January – Thirtysomething (1987–1991)
- 27 January – Roseanne (1988–1997)
- 14 February – Out on Tuesday (aka Out) (1989–1992)
- 20 February – Behaving Badly (1989)
- 3 April – The Channel Four Daily (1989–1992)
- 8 April – The World of David the Gnome (1985)
- 23 April – The Henderson Kids (1985–1987)
- 26 April – Club X (1989)
- 23 May – Absolutely (1989–1993)
- 30 May – Prisoners of Childhood (1989)
- 11 June – The Manageress (1989–1990)
- 22 June – Traffik (1989)
- 20 August
  - The Wonder Years (1988–1993)
  - The Endless Game (1989)
- 17 October – Sticky Moments (1989–1990)
- 11 November – 4 Play (1989–1991) (Anthology)
- 28 December – Look Back in Anger (1989)
- 31 December – Granpa (1989)

=== Sky Channel/One ===
- 5 February
  - Dolly (1987–1988)
  - Spearfield's Daughter (1986)
- 6 February – Sky Star Search (1989–1991)
- 3 September – 21 Jump Street (1987–1991)
- 15 October – Amerika (1987)
- 24 October – Dick Francis Mysteries (1989)
- Unknown – My Little Pony (1986–1987)

=== Sky News ===
- 6 February – Sunrise (1989–2019)

== Channels ==
=== New channels ===
| Date | Channel |
|---|---|
| 5 February | Sky News |
| 5 February | Sky Movies |
| 5 February | Eurosport |
| 1 April | Discovery Channel Europe |

=== Defunct channels ===
| Date | Channel |
|---|---|
| 31 July | Premiere |

=== Rebranded channels ===
| Date | Old Name | New Name |
|---|---|---|
| 31 July | Sky Channel | Sky One |

== Television shows ==
=== Changes of network affiliation ===
| Shows | Moved from | Moved to |
|---|---|---|
| Sale of the Century | ITV | Sky One |
| The Price Is Right | ITV | Sky One |

=== Returning this year after a break of one year or longer ===
- Watch with Mother (1952–1975) (1987, 1989, 1993 VHS Only)

== Continuing television shows ==
=== 1920s ===
- BBC Wimbledon (1927–1939, 1946–2019, 2021–present)

=== 1930s ===
- Trooping the Colour (1937–1939, 1946–2019, 2023–present)
- The Boat Race (1938–1939, 1946–2019, 2021–present)
- BBC Cricket (1939, 1946–1999, 2020–2024)

=== 1940s ===
- Come Dancing (1949–1998)

=== 1950s ===
- What's My Line? (1951–1964, 1984–1996)
- Panorama (1953–present)
- What the Papers Say (1956–2008)
- The Sky at Night (1957–present)
- Blue Peter (1958–present)
- Grandstand (1958–2007)

=== 1960s ===
- Coronation Street (1960–present)
- Songs of Praise (1961–present)
- Doctor Who (1963–1989, 1996, 2005–present)
- World in Action (1963–1998)
- Top of the Pops (1964–2006)
- Match of the Day (1964–present)
- Crossroads (1964–1988, 2001–2003)
- Play School (1964–1988)
- Mr. and Mrs. (1965–1999)
- World of Sport (1965–1985)
- Jackanory (1965–1996, 2006)
- Sportsnight (1965–1997)
- Call My Bluff (1965–2005)
- The Money Programme (1966–2010)
- Reksio (1967–1990)
- The Big Match (1968–2002)

=== 1970s ===
- The Old Grey Whistle Test (1971–1987)
- The Two Ronnies (1971–1987, 1991, 1996, 2005)
- Pebble Mill at One (1972–1986)
- Rainbow (1972–1992, 1994–1997)
- Emmerdale (1972–present)
- Newsround (1972–present)
- Weekend World (1972–1988)
- We Are the Champions (1973–1987)
- Last of the Summer Wine (1973–2010)
- That's Life! (1973–1994)
- Wish You Were Here...? (1974–2003)
- Arena (1975–present)
- Jim'll Fix It (1975–1994)
- One Man and His Dog (1976–present)
- 3-2-1 (1978–1988)
- Grange Hill (1978–2008)
- Ski Sunday (1978–present)
- Terry and June (1979–1987)
- The Book Tower (1979–1989)
- Blankety Blank (1979–1990, 1997–2002)
- The Paul Daniels Magic Show (1979–1994)
- Antiques Roadshow (1979–present)
- Question Time (1979–present)

=== 1980s ===
- Play Your Cards Right (1980–1987, 1994–1999, 2002–2003)
- Family Fortunes (1980–2002, 2006–2015, 2020–present)
- Juliet Bravo (1980–1985)
- Cockleshell Bay (1980–1986)
- Children in Need (1980–present)
- Finders Keepers (1981–1985)
- Freetime (1981–1985)
- Game for a Laugh (1981–1985)
- Tenko (1981–1985)
- That's My Boy (1981–1986)
- Razzamatazz (1981–1987)
- Bergerac (1981–1991)
- Odd One Out (1982–1985)
- On Safari (1982–1985)
- 'Allo 'Allo! (1982–1992)
- Wogan (1982–1992)
- Saturday Superstore (1982–1987)
- The Tube (1982–1987)
- Brookside (1982–2003)
- Countdown (1982–present)
- Let's Pretend (TV series) (1982–1988)
- No. 73 (1982–1988)
- Timewatch (1982–present)
- Right to Reply (1982–2001)
- Up the Elephant and Round the Castle (1983–1985)
- Inspector Gadget (1983–1986)
- Bananaman (1983–1986)
- Just Good Friends (1983–1986)
- Philip Marlowe, Private Eye (1983–1986)
- Breadwinners (1983–1986)
- Breakfast Time (1983–1989)
- Dramarama (1983–1989)
- Don't Wait Up (1983–1990)
- Good Morning Britain (1983–1992)
- First Tuesday (1983–1993)
- Highway (1983–1993)
- Blockbusters (1983–93, 1994–95, 1997, 2000–01, 2012, 2019)
- The New Statesman (1987–1994)
- The Cook Report (1987–1999)

== Ending this year ==
- 10 February – High Street Blues (1989)
- 29 March – Tumbledown Farm (1988–1989)
- 19 April – Charlie Chalk (1988–1989)
- 26 April – Barney (1988–1989)
- 1 May – The Benny Hill Show (1955–1989)
- 14 May – Capstick's Law (1989)
- 16 May – The Book Tower (1979–1989)
- 18 May – Treasure Hunt (1982–1989)
- 4 June – Running Wild (1987–1989)
- 5 June – When Will I Be Famous (1989)
- 6 June – The Bubblegum Brigade (1989)
- 18 June – Three Up, Two Down (1985–1989)
- 27 June – TUGS (1989)
- 17 July – Rules of Engagement (1989)
- 23 July – Tales of Sherwood Forest (1989)
- 24 July – Traffik (1989)
- 8 August – Creepy Crawlies (1987–1989)
- 15 August – C.A.B. (1986–1989)
- 21 August – Dramarama (1983–1989)
- 29 August – Hard Cases (1988–1989)
- 30 August – Anything More Would Be Greedy (1989)
- 1 September – Bangers and Mash (1989)
- 20 September – EMU-TV (1989)
- 29 September – Breakfast Time (1983–1989)
- 8 October – First of the Summer Wine (1988–1989)
- 9 October – Streets Apart (1988–1989)
- 13 October – Square Deal (1988–1989)
- 25 October – Confessional (1989)
- 11 November – Saturday Matters with Sue Lawley (1989)
- 19 November – Mother Love (1989)
- 25 November – Saracen (1989)
- 1 December – A Bit of a Do (1989)
- 6 December – Doctor Who (1963–1989, 1996, 2005–present)
- 7 December – The Poddington Peas (1989)
- 17 December – The Ginger Tree (1989)
- 18 December – The Real Ghostbusters (1986–1991)
- 24 December – Ever Decreasing Circles (1984–1989)
- 25 December – Thunderbirds Superstar 90 (1987–1988)

== Births ==
- 8 February – Dani Harmer, actress
- 16 February – Yinka Bokinni, broadcast presenter
- 2 March – Nathalie Emmanuel, actress
- 23 March – Jessica Baglow, actress
- 7 June – London Hughes, presenter and comedian
- 23 July – Daniel Radcliffe, actor (Harry Potter films)
- 30 July – Zeze Millz, television personality

== Deaths ==
| Date | Name | Age | Cinematic Credibility |
|---|---|---|---|
| 27 January | Arthur Marshall | 78 | writer, humorist and television personality (Call My Bluff) |
| 21 February | Robert Dorning | 75 | musician and actor |
| 19 March | Charles Lamb | 88 | actor |
| 12 April | Gerald Flood | 61 | actor |
| 15 April | Freda Lingstrom | 95 | children's television commissioner (Andy Pandy) |
| 15 June | Geoffrey Alexander | 58 | actor |
| 1 July | Joan Cooper | 66 | actress |
| 2 July | Ben Wright | 74 | actor |
| 4 July | Jack Haig | 76 | actor ('Allo 'Allo!, Crossroads) |
| 11 July | Laurence Olivier | 82 | actor, director, producer and narrator of the landmark documentary series The World at War |
| 15 July | Dennis Wilson | 69 | Theme tune composer (Fawlty Towers) |
| 23 July | Michael Sundin | 28 | Presenter and actor (Blue Peter) |
| 4 August | Maurice Colbourne | 49 | actor |
| 17 August | Harry Corbett | 71 | magician and television presenter (Sooty) |
| 8 September | Ann George | 86 | actress (Crossroads) |
| 19 September | Philip Sayer | 42 | actor (Floodtide) |
| 4 October | Graham Chapman | 48 | comedian, actor, writer, physician and one of the six members of the Monty Python comedy troupe |
| 20 October | Anthony Quayle | 76 | actor |
| 7 November | Alec Mango | 78 | actor |
| 21 November | Peter Burton | 68 | actor |
| 11 December | Howard Lang | 78 | actor (The Onedin Line) |
| 15 December | Edward Underdown | 81 | actor |
| 17 December | Edward Boyd | 72 | screenwriter |
| 23 December | Peter Bennett | 72 | actor |
| 26 December | Peggy Thorpe-Bates | 75 | actress (Rumpole of the Bailey) |
| 30 December | Madoline Thomas | 99 | actress |

== See also ==
- 1989 in British music
- 1989 in British radio
- 1989 in the United Kingdom
- List of British films of 1989
