= Cécile Paoli =

French actress

- Born: France
- Occupation: Actress
- Years active: 1978–present

Cécile Paoli is a French actress who is also well known on British television from the series Sharpe, Bergerac, and Holby City.

She starred as Françoise in a four-part television BBC mini-series in 1980 of the H.E. Bates novel, Fair Stood the Wind for France She played Isabelle de Chamonpierre in the 1989 television serial The Ginger Tree, based on the novel by Oswald Wynd. In Sharpe, she portrayed Lucille Castineau, in Bergerac she played Francine Leland, during the first series. She was a member of the Royal Shakespeare Company's 1984–85 season, where her roles included Catherine, Princess of France, (opposite Kenneth Branagh) in Henry V.

She appeared in the Endeavour episode "Sway" in April 2014.

== Partial filmography ==
- Les fourberies de Scapin (1981) - Zerbinette
- The Legend of the Holy Drinker (1988) - Fur store seller
- The Gravy Train Goes East (1991) - Galina Vitali
- L'ambassade en folie (1992) - Molly
- Voyage à Rome (1992) - Nathalie
- Kaspar Hauser (1993) - Stefanie von Baden
- Riders (1993) - Laura
- Les Collègues (1999) - Inès
- Weep no more my lady (1993)
- Mafiosa (2006) - Alberta
