= The Ginger Tree (TV series) =

- Genre: Period drama
- Based on: The Ginger Tree by Oswald Wynd
- Written by: Christopher Hampton
- Directed by: Anthony Garner; Morimasa Matsumoto
- Starring: Samantha Bond; Daisuke Ryu; Adrian Rawlins; Fumi Dan; Joanna McCallum
- Composer: Dominic Muldowney
- Country of origin: United Kingdom
- Original language: English
- No. of series: 1
- No. of episodes: 4

Production
- Executive producers: Marilyn Hall; Alan Shallcross; Rebecca Eaton; Naonori Kawamura
- Producer: Timothy Ironside-Wood
- Running time: 50 minutes
- Production companies: Hallet Street Productions; NHK Japan; WGBH Boston for BBC

Original release
- Network: BBC1
- Release: 26 November – 17 December 1989

The Ginger Tree is a 1989 four-part BBC TV adaptation of the Oswald Wynd 1977 novel of the same name. It was adapted by Christopher Hampton and directed by Anthony Garner and Morimasa Matsumoto. It aired on BBC1 from 26 November to 17 December 1989, and starred Samantha Bond, Daisuke Ryu, and Adrian Rawlins.

It was the first high-definition serial to be made for the BBC, although it wasn't broadcast in HD or given an HD release. The series was broadcast in the U.S. on the PBS series Masterpiece Theatre in 1990. It was produced in 1035 line HD using the Sony HDD 1000 VTR.

The series won the 1990 BAFTA for Best Video Lighting (by Clive Thomas). It was also nominated for Best Video Cameraman (Ron Green), Best Design (Michael Young), Best Costume Design (Michael Burdle), and Best VTR Editor (Stan Pow).

== Plot ==
In 1903, Mary McKenzie travels to Manchuria to join her fiancé. After her marriage, she finds her husband is indifferent to her and her needs and she falls in love with a married Japanese nobleman. She bears him a son and is subsequently forced to leave China for Japan. She must carve out a life for herself in Japanese society as both a Westerner and a woman.

== Cast ==
- Samantha Bond as Mary MacKenzie
- Daisuke Ryu as Count Kentaro Kurihama
- Adrian Rawlins as Captain Richard Collingsworth
- Fumi Dan as Baroness Aiko Onnodera
- Joanna McCallum as Alicia Bassett-Hill
- Michael Grandage as Nick
- Cécile Paoli as Isabelle de Chamonpierre
- Shigeru Muroi as Minagawa
- Hironori Wada as Taro (3 Months Old)
- Noriko Aida as Misao
- Mari Shirato as Countess Kurihama
- Nicholas Le Prevost as Sir Claude MacDonald
- Saike Koike as Komoro
- Carol Starks as Margaret Blair

== Production ==
After Scots actress Hannah Gordon had read the play on Scottish radio, she attempted to have the book adapted by the BBC. There were three Hollywood options that failed to be realized. Retired actress Juliet Gitterman took an interest in the book and raised money for its production. After a number of false starts, the project was completed.

The Ginger Tree, a co-production of the BBC and the NHK network of Japan, was the first high-definition serial to be made for the BBC, although it has never been broadcast in HD by the BBC nor given an HD release. It was produced in 1035 line HD using the Sony HDD 1000 VTR.

== Reception ==
The New York Times wrote of the series "Despite several fine performances, The Ginger Tree turns out to be unabsorbing. The East-meets-West aspects of the story are handled intelligently. The on-location effects are often splendid. But the overall production is plodding and curiously sluggish.". Howard Rosenberg, writing for the Los Angeles Times, agreed and wrote the series "is a slow-evolving come-on with a disappointing payoff." While he praised the first two episodes, the production, and Samantha Bond's performance, he wrote of the final episodes: "As Mary gains assurance, the drop-off in intensity is dramatic. There is simply never any doubt where this part of the story is taking you or how it will arrive there. It's an unsatisfying resolution to a drama that begins so promisingly."

== Media releases ==
The complete series on DVD in a two-disc set was released by Simply Media on 25 April 2016.
