= Blackeyes (TV series) =

1989 British television series

Blackeyes is a 1989 BBC television drama series, written and directed by Dennis Potter. It was adapted from Potter's novel of the same name.

It starred Gina Bellman as the title character, an attractive model, with Michael Gough in a key role as her uncle. Potter described the series's theme as the objectification of "young and attractive women as consumer goods in a way that brutalises both sexes".

It was broadcast as four 50-minute episodes, first screened weekly from 29 November 1989 to 20 December 1989 on Britain's BBC2 channel, It was repeated multiple times on the now-defunct channels UK Drama and UK Arena in the late 90s and early 00s but remains unreleased on DVD or Blu-ray.

== Cast ==
- Gina Bellman as Blackeyes
- Michael Gough as Maurice James Kingsley
- Carol Royle as Jessica
- Nigel Planer as Jeff
- John Shrapnel as Detective Blake
- Colin Jeavons as Jamieson
- Charles Gray as Sebastian
- Dennis Potter as Narrator (uncredited)
- Louise Germaine as Model (uncredited)

=== Notes ===
Jeavons had previously appeared in Potter's Blue Remembered Hills, Bellman later appeared in Potter's Secret Friends while Germaine went on to star in Lipstick on Your Collar and Midnight Movie.

== Production ==
Following the successes of The Singing Detective and Christabel, the BBC awarded a budget of £2.4 million to the production of Blackeyes. It was shot on 35 mm film and took 18 months to complete. Despite illness, Potter opted to direct the series, the only time he did this for TV. He had considered both Jon Amiel and Nicolas Roeg, both recent collaborators, for the job. He would consider it a mistake to direct the serial himself. In 2007 an article in The Guardian written by Jon Wilde revealed that the journalist had been the inspiration for the character of Mark Wilsher, "an insufferably smug hack" in episode 2.

=== Press anticipation ===
The premiere of the series was eagerly anticipated. Six months before screening it was promoted on the cover of The Listener with an image of Gina Bellman in role as the title character and the caption "Potter's Dream - Beyond The Singing Detective". James Saynor, the magazine's sub-editor at the time, wrote inside of Potter's ambitious desire to subvert the norms of film grammar in the series following an on-set interview with the fledgling director. In the lead-up to broadcast Potter promoted the series by appearing on TV chat-show Saturday Matters with Sue Lawley and was interviewed in newspapers such as New Statesman and The Observer. Each time he made reference to "falling in love with Blackeyes", making clear how personal this project was to him.

== Reception ==
=== Press screening ===
A press screening of the series on 22 November provoked negative responses in several of the journalists and reviewers present. It was described in previews as "soft porn". and "a simple turn-on for male viewers". Some journalists attacked Potter in their reports: in City Limits Deborah Orr described him as "unpleasant", Maria Lexton condemned him in Time Out as "a very sick man...[with a] twisted attitude to women and fucking" and in the Evening Standard he was dismissed as "a dirty old man". The Daily Mirror created a new nickname for Potter when its front-page headline asked, "All clever stuff - Or just Dirty, Den?" Sally Payne summed up the tension between Potter's intentions and their execution in the Sunday Times, "My gut feeling was distinct unease which verged on outrage the more I thought about it. I became convinced that Potter was guilty of the crime he was condemning."

=== After transmission ===
Following transmission, favourable comments were offered by the reviewers of several broadsheets. Mark Lawson applauded Potter's willingness to take risks, comparing him to novelist Martin Amis, while Christopher Tookey linked Potter to August Strindberg and Jonathan Swift and described Blackeyes as possibly "the most interesting, original and honest work he's done since Pennies from Heaven".

The majority of the British press reacted negatively to the series, many highlighting the amount of sex and nudity as cause for complaint. The Sunday Express called it "the world's most complicated porn film" fit for "the wastebin", the Sunday Times reasserted its antipathy to Blackeyes at the series' conclusion, summing it up as "Porno Twaddle". The series was also attacked for being "immensely boring" in The Daily Telegraph.

Blackeyes was the subject of mocking cartoons in several tabloids, again focusing on the nudity. The Daily Mirror featured a cartoon by Charles Griffin depicting a naked Potter tapping out a script at his desk with a caricatured Bellman (also naked) sitting alongside his typewriter. The couple are being interrupted by campaigner Mary Whitehouse who is waving her fist at the writer and exclaiming, "Potter! I'll give you flamin' Blackeyes!" The Daily Star presented an image of a BBC Drama department office in which all the staff were going about their business either naked or in underwear. A bank of TV screens show titles such as 'Brown Eyes', 'Square Eyes' and 'Slant Eyes' while another reads 'Blackeyes - Get em off'. A man dressed in black lingerie is sitting beside bundles of letters labelled 'Complaints' and speaking into a phone saying, "OK, so a girl walks about half-naked - is that so unusual?"

=== Response to criticism ===
No stranger to controversy, Potter was stunned by the level of press hostility and was particularly saddened at the way he was labelled with nicknames such as "Dirty Den" and "Television's Mr Filth". He described himself as being "in the pit of a real depression" and upset by the personal comments made about him in City Limits and Time Out. In a Radio 2 interview he suggested his writing career might be at an end.

The criticisms also enabled Potter to speak directly about his own experience of child abuse, which he had attempted to address in Blackeyes, an element of the series that had seemingly been overlooked by its critics: "If you listen to the voice-over [in the last episode] you'll see it's very clear why [child abuse] strikes my heart. I've never been able to speak directly about it - no one who's had such an experience has ever been able to speak about it except obliquely. It sits there and makes me sweat even now". The Sunday Telegraph acknowledged Potter's childhood experience as "the source of the harrowing scene in the last episode". The sequence involves the character of Maurice Kingsley about to sexually abuse his niece Jessica until Potter's voice-over interrupts: "No, you'll have to imagine the rest if you must... the snake in his hand has become the worm in her soul. Recollections of abuse - my god - they're hard to deal with - even though I try... There are times when the pen in your hand becomes... becomes - yes - a knife in someone else's".

In 1993 Potter summed up the initial press reaction to Blackeyes by calling it "a tide of polemical abuse of such huge proportions in the English tabloids that it was almost proof I was stepping on the right nerves, if not totally in the right way". A few years' removed from the project he admitted responsibility for some of the negative reaction, saying, "there were too many strands, and the style, which is very alienating, it was so successful it alienated every fucking person who ever saw it!" and "I did fail. If there's such universal rejection and opposition and incomprehension then it's extremely likely that it was either badly written, or badly done, or both."

== Critical analysis ==
Graham Fuller describes Blackeyes as "a complex analysis of institutionalized sexism" and an "abstruse but in many ways extremely courageous post-feminist revenge thriller" in his 1993 book Potter on Potter, a collection of interviews with the writer. Acknowledging the original press reaction, he describes the series as being "condemned for feeding the very sickness it claimed to be diagnosing" and defends Potter by asserting that the programme's explicit scenes were "unintended to be titillating to viewers who would elect to see them that way". Twenty years later Fuller continues to challenge the tabloid view of Blackeyes in Sight & Sound, "Advertising is the arena in which Blackeyes throws herself to the lions...auditioning in a bikini for salivating ad executives...[the scene is] intercut with fragmented moments from the history of Jessica Kingsley...as a sexual-abuse victim who eventually drowns herself - how could Potter not have been taken seriously?"

Sergio Angelini calls Blackeyes "a deliberately uncomfortable, humorous, densely imagined, frequently powerful if imperfect work, one that practically vanished after its original airing but which, now that its shock value has long been superseded, needs to be re-assessed by a new generation".
