= Find Me a Family =

- Directed by: Mark Henderson
- Presented by: David Akinsanya
- Country of origin: United Kingdom
- Original language: English
- No. of series: 1
- No. of episodes: 3

Production
- Production company: Betty TV

Original release
- Network: Channel 4
- Release: 11 May – 13 May 2009

Related
- Find a Family

Find Me A Family is a British television series with the aim of rehoming of disadvantaged children with adoptive parents. This three-part series aired on Channel 4 in 2009 as part of the channel's Britain's Forgotten Children season. It follows the course of three families taking part in a project to rehome children in care who would otherwise be overlooked. Subsequently, it was used as a training aid to educate prospective adopters in the United Kingdom.
