= Blackeyes =

1988 novel by Dennis Potter

- First edition
- Author: Dennis Potter
- Language: English
- Genre: Novel
- Publisher: Faber & Faber
- Publication date: 12 October 1988
- Publication place: United Kingdom
- Media type: Print (hardback & paperback)
- Pages: 184 pp
- ISBN: 0-679-72047-2
- OCLC: 17952787
- Dewey Decimal: 823/.914 19
- LC Class: PR6066.O77 B56 1988

Blackeyes is a novel by British writer Dennis Potter, published in 1987 by Faber and Faber. It concerns the relationship between sexuality, exploitation, power and money. These are explored through the career of a desirable model known as "Blackeyes".

The novel was later adapted by Potter as a 1989 BBC television serial of the same name with actress Gina Bellman in the eponymous role.
