= Dooby Duck's Disco Bus =

- Country of origin: United Kingdom

Production
- Running time: 10 min.

Original release
- Network: BBC
- Release: 5 January 1989 – 23 December 1992

Dooby Duck's Disco Bus is a children's puppet show presented by Dooby Duck (created by Alan Hausrath and Harry Stuart), a puppet duck with a shiny showbiz jacket and a pink bow-tie, who introduced puppets singing contemporary songs of the day. Dooby signed off each show laughing and saying 'Dooby Dooby Dooby Dooby Dooby Quack Quack'. The character first appeared as a segment on the children's sketch programme 'The Satellite Show'.

== Series guide ==
Dooby Duck's Disco Bus
13 editions. Broadcast 5 January 1989 – 30 March 1989
Dooby's Duck Truck
13 editions. Broadcast 3 January 1991 – 28 March 1991
Dooby Duck's Euro Tour
13 editions. Broadcast 30 September 1992 – 23 December 1992

All series were given repeat airings.

== Reception ==
"This puppet duck presented other puppets singing contemporary songs of the day for five minutes just before 4.00 pm. Sounds simple, yet it achieved a viewing audience of 3 million and had something of a cult following with students.", according to the website Nostalgia Central.

Jim Sangster also considers that Pinky and Perky's "basic format (...) was revived in 1989 for the bizarre Dooby Duck's Disco Bus (5 Jan-30 Mar 1989), which once again had marionette animals performing contemporary pop hits."
