= Sue Lawley =

British broadcaster

Sue Lawley OBE
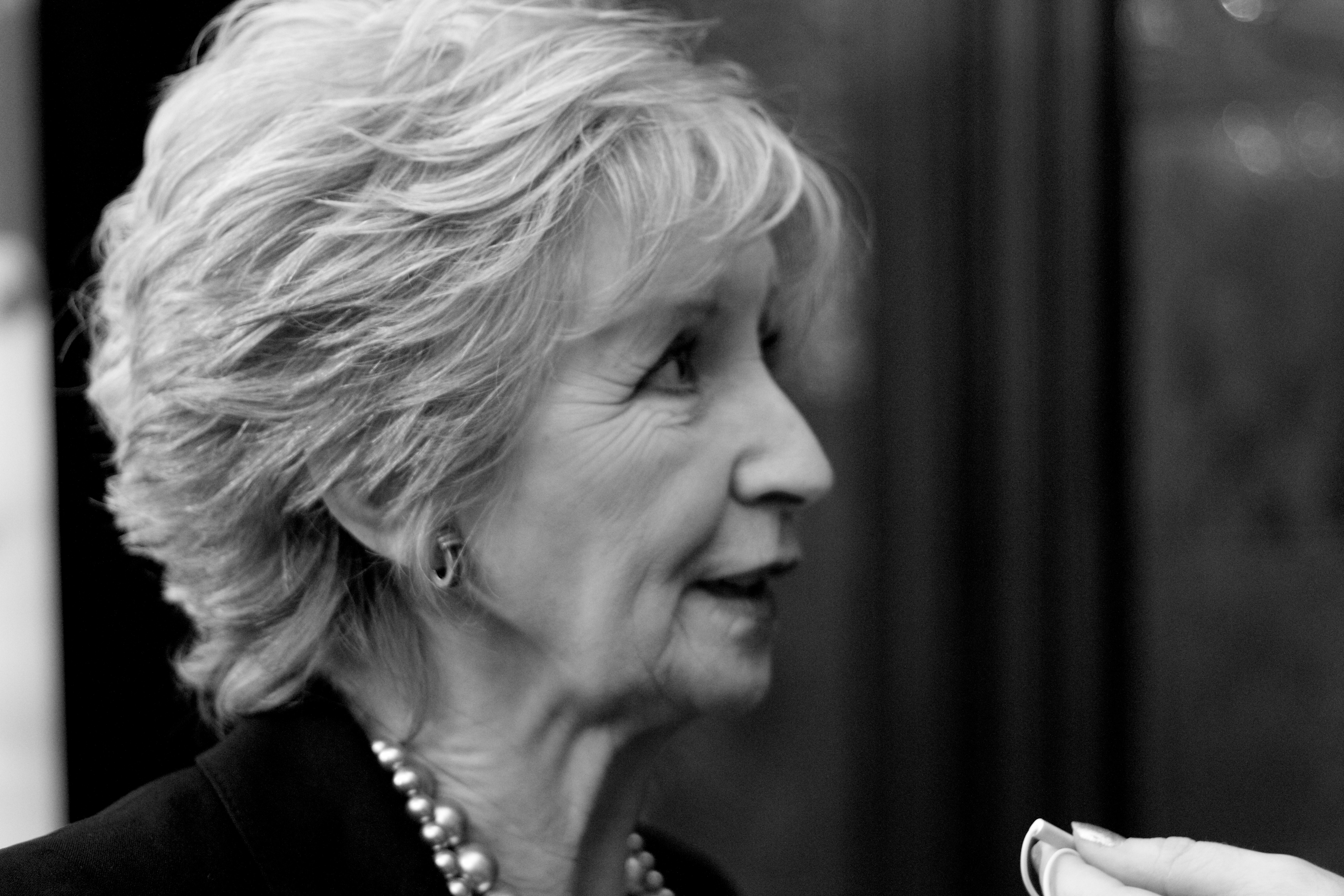
- Lawley in 2010
- Born: Susan Lawley; 14 July 1946 (age 80); Sedgley, West Midlands, England
- Education: University of Bristol
- Occupations: News presenter, television presenters
- Notable credit(s): Nationwide; BBC Six O'Clock News; Desert Island Discs
- Spouses: David Ashby (m. 1975; div. 1985) Hugh Williams (m. 1987)

Susan Lawley (born 14 July 1946) is an English retired television and radio broadcaster. Her main broadcasting background involved television news and current affairs. From 1988 to 2006 she was the presenter of Desert Island Discs on BBC Radio 4.

== Early life and education ==
Susan Lawley was born in Sedgley, Staffordshire, near Dudley, on 14 July 1946, and was a pupil at Dudley Girls High School. She studied modern languages at the University of Bristol, where she dropped her Dudley accent in favour of received pronunciation.

== Career ==
She began her professional career as a trainee reporter on the Western Mail and South Wales Echo between 1967 and 1970, during which time she shared a house in Cardiff with Michael Buerk. She then moved to BBC Plymouth as a subeditor and freelance reporter from 1970 until 1972. In 1972 she worked as a sound recordist and then gained prominence as one of the reporters/presenters of BBC TV's news magazine Nationwide. She appeared on the show until 1975, when she was offered the main anchor role on the nightly news programme Tonight.

In 1974 Lawley was part of the BBC's Election Team for the October general election and in 1979 she anchored the morning election results show the day after the general election night broadcast.

Lawley left Tonight on maternity leave in 1978, being replaced by Valerie Singleton, and after her maternity leave, rejoined Nationwide as one of the two main anchors, alongside Frank Bough. Lawley remained with the show until it came to an end in 1983. During an interview with the Carpenters on Nationwide in October 1981, she surprised the singer Karen Carpenter by asking her directly about her anorexia, an eating disorder which contributed to her death on 4 February 1983. Lawley is also notable for moderating a telephone town hall with Margaret Thatcher towards the end of Nationwide's run, in which the then-Prime Minister was caught off guard by Diana Gould, a geography teacher from Gloucestershire who questioned the sinking of ARA General Belgrano during the Falklands War. This ultimately led to tensions between Thatcher's administration and the BBC through the 1980s.

After Nationwide, Lawley became an anchor of the Nine O'Clock News bulletin on BBC1. When Robin Day suffered a heart attack, Lawley sat in for him as the chair of the topical discussion programme Question Time for several editions, many years before Fiona Bruce became the first female full-time presenter of the show.

In September 1984 Lawley become the lead anchor of the newly-launched Six O'Clock News. Lawley was praised after a broadcast on 23 May 1988, when the studio was invaded by protesters opposed to Section 28: she continued to read the news whilst co-presenter Nicholas Witchell restrained one of them. In July 1988 Lawley left the Six O'Clock News.

In 1989 the BBC launched Lawley in her own Saturday night talk show titled Saturday Matters with Sue Lawley. The first guest interviewed was Sarah, Duchess of York. The show was cancelled after one series. In 1993 Lawley hosted the BBC1 show Biteback. She was later part of ITN's presenting team in its ITV Election 97 coverage.

Lawley later introduced the BBC Radio 4 Reith Lectures and was also a board member of the English Tourism Council and English National Opera.

In an interview in 2019 for an edition of BBC Radio 4's The Reunion, looking back at pioneering women newsreaders, Lawley confirmed to host Sue MacGregor that she was fully retired.

== Guest appearances and Desert Island Discs ==
In 1981 Lawley made a guest appearance in the Yes Minister episode "The Quality of Life", playing herself. Throughout the 1980s and into the early 1990s, she was the regular stand-in for Terry Wogan on his BBC1 thrice-weekly chat show Wogan. From 27 March 1988 to 27 August 2006, Lawley was the presenter of Desert Island Discs on BBC Radio 4.

== Personal life ==
Lawley was appointed Officer of the Order of the British Empire (OBE) for services to broadcasting in the 2001 New Year Honours.
