= Secret Friends =

1991 British film by Dennis Potter

Secret Friends is a 1991 British film written and directed by Dennis Potter and starring Alan Bates, Gina Bellman and Ian McNeice. It was based on Potter's novel Ticket to Ride. The screenplay concerns a man whose fantasy spirals out of control.

== Premise ==
During a train journey, a man's fantasy spirals out of control.

== Cast ==
- Alan Bates - John
- Gina Bellman - Helen
- Frances Barber - Angela
- Tony Doyle - Martin
- Joanna David - Kate
- Ian McNeice - First Businessman
- Davyd Harries - Second Businessman
- Colin Jeavons - Vicar
- Rowena Cooper - Vicar's Wife

== Production ==
The film cost £1.5 million and was produced by Film Four, Whistling Gypsy and Briar Patch.

== Reception ==
The film grossed £2,000 in the United Kingdom.
