= Find a Family =

- Logo
- Directed by: Keith Haley; Wendy Nelson
- Theme music composer: Allan Clarke and Gary Benson
- Opening theme: "Find Me a Family" by The Hollies
- Country of origin: United Kingdom
- Original language: English
- No. of series: 3

Production
- Producer: Wendy Nelson
- Production company: Central Independent Television

Original release
- Network: ITV
- Release: 12 February 1989 – 1991

Related
- Find Me a Family

Find a Family is a British television programme that aired between 1989 and 1991 across the ITV network. The programme was an appeal to find new families for children in need of adoption or long-term fostering.

It usually took the form of a series of short videos shown during advertisement breaks between scheduled program slots. The video would appeal for a foster family to a homeless child seeking a family. During that same week there would be a longer programme which highlighted the needs of children and the results of the phone in campaign for that week.

The theme music for the show was written by Allan Clarke and Gary Benson and performed by the Hollies. The track, "Find Me a Family" (note the slight variation from the programme's title), was released as a single and peaked at No. 79.

The Programme Adviser was Shelagh Beckett. The series was highly successful in identifying numerous families for children and raising the profile of fostering and adoption.

The show is not to be confused with the identically titled occasional slot in LWT's The Weekend Live. In 2009, Channel 4 aired a documentary series following a similar theme under the title "Find Me a Family".
