= Daisuke Ryu =

Japanese actor (1957–2021)

Daisuke Ryu (Japanese: 隆大介, Korean: 장명남, Jang Myeong-nam, hanja: 張明男; 14 January 1957 – 11 April 2021) was a Japanese actor of Korean descent.

He won the Japanese "best new actor" Blue Ribbon Award for his performance as the warlord Oda Nobunaga in Akira Kurosawa's Kagemusha. His other notable performances include Saburo Ichimonji in another Kurosawa epic, Ran, and the legendary yamabushi, Musashibo Benkei, in Sogo Ishii's critically acclaimed Gojoe: Spirit War Chronicle. In 'The Ginger Tree' (based on the novel by Oswald Wynd), Daisuke Ryu played Count Kentaro Kurihama.

On March 21, 2015, Ryu travelled to Taiwan, where he was to perform in the Martin Scorsese film Silence. Upon arrival at Taoyuan International Airport, he was stopped by immigration officials due to having an incomplete entry form. Ryu, who was intoxicated at the time, engaged in an altercation with one of the officers, who sustained a fractured leg. He was indicted and prohibited from leaving Taiwan, and subsequently fired from the production of Silence. In May, 2015, Ryu reconciled with the injured official and publicly apologized for his actions. In June, he was fined by Taiwanese courts for his part in the incident and allowed to return to Japan.
