= Play bus =

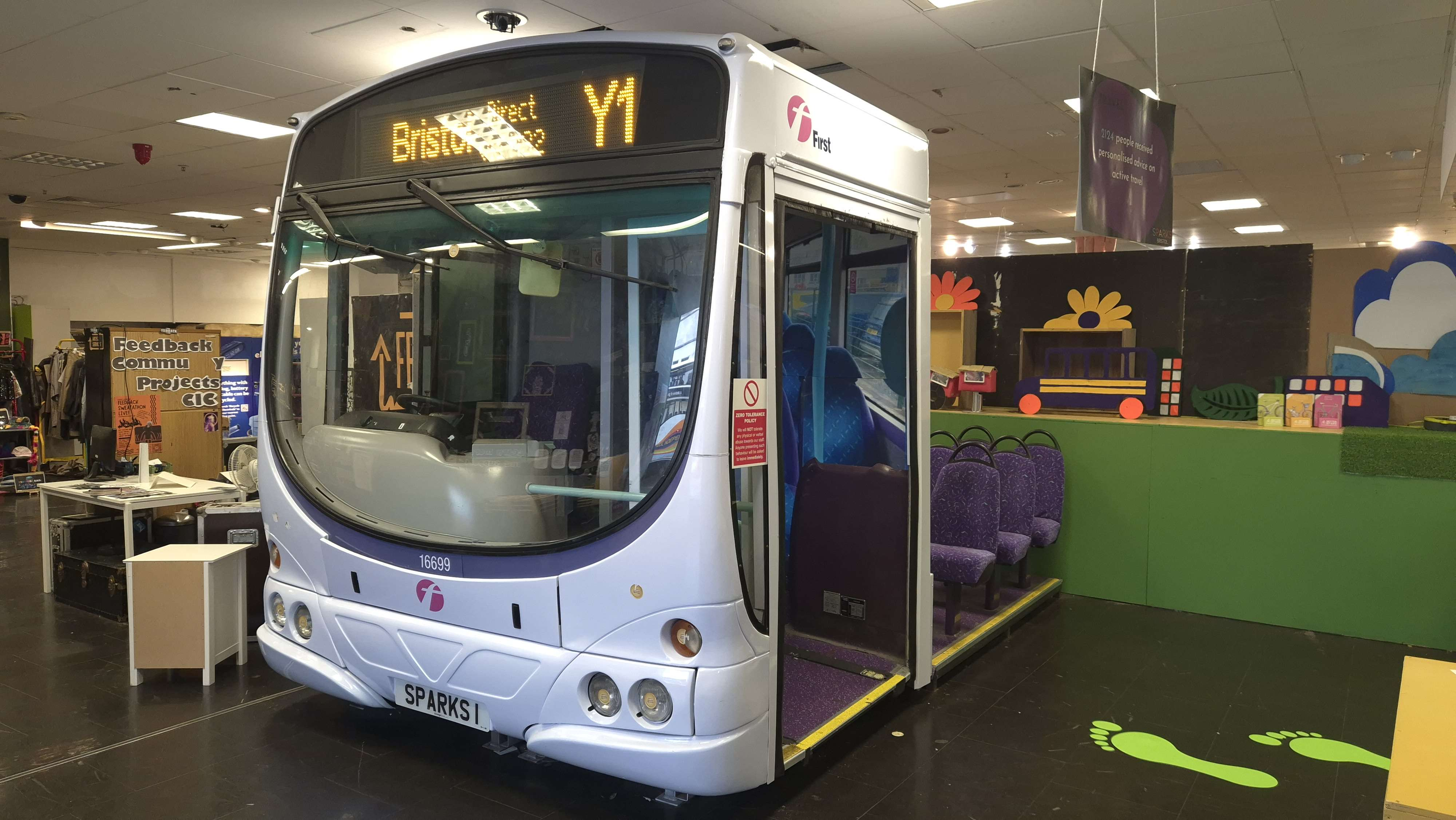
'SPARKS 1', a cut down FirstGroup play bus, located in the Sparks Bristol department store in September 2025

A play bus (or playbus or learning bus) is a bus used for providing a mobile facility for a variety of activities surrounding entertainment and education, usually for children of pre-school or school age.

Play buses are specially converted for their purpose, usually from second hand vehicles, although occasionally are purpose built by a bus manufacturer. Play buses can be of any size, from minibuses to double-deckers, and may be operated by charities, education authorities or as private businesses. The latter particularly market their services as a mobile party venue for children's birthday celebrations and the like.

Depending on usage and fittings, play buses may provide mobile playgrounds, gymnasiums, library services, or education centres as a mobile classroom.

In the United Kingdom, the National Playbus Association was a charity that provided support and advice to organisations, wishing to operate play buses. It was formed in 1969, and was supported by various government departments. It went into liquidation and folded on 31 December 2016.

== Gallery ==
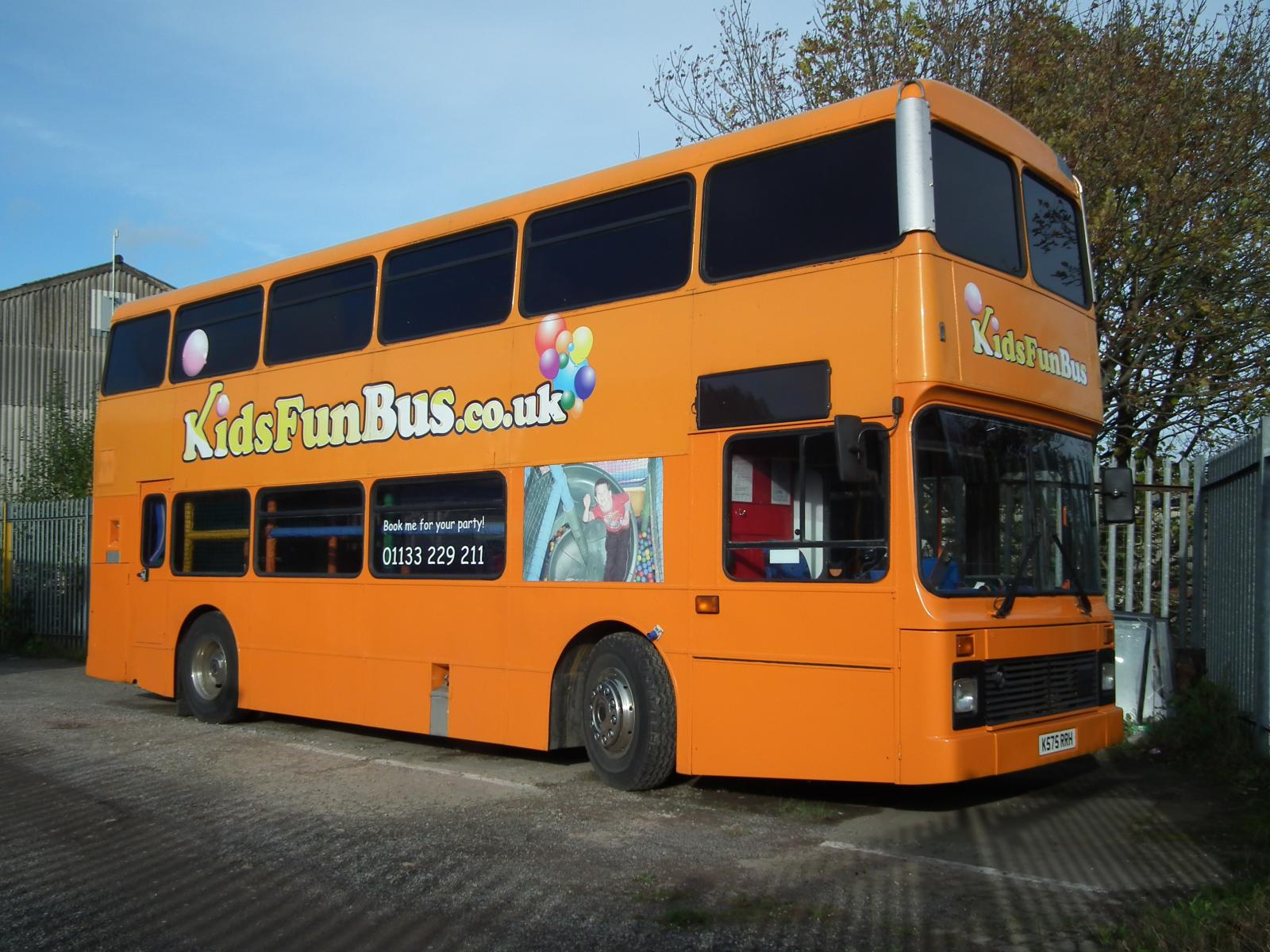
Northern Counties Palatine bodied Leyland Olympian in October 2013

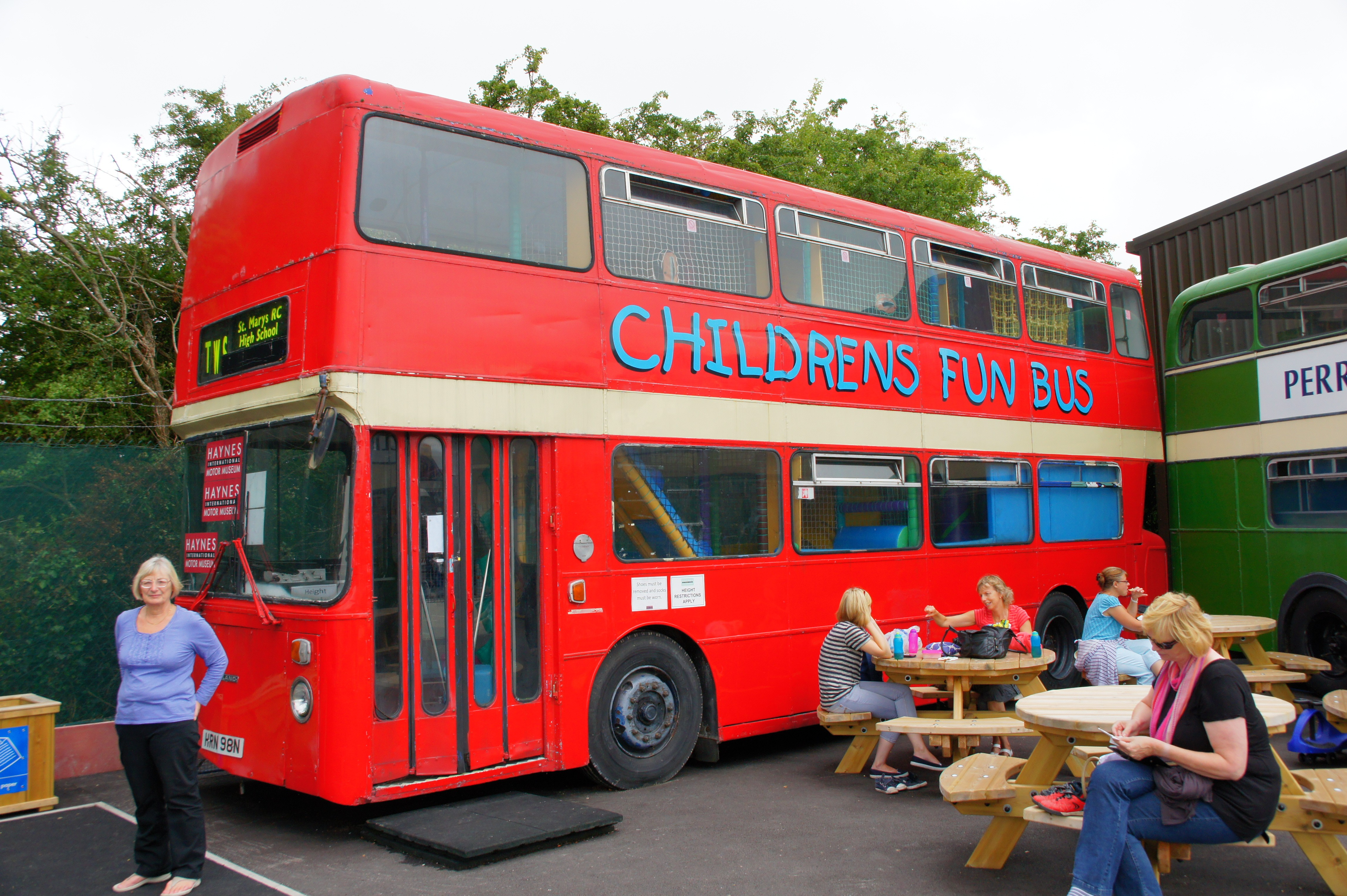
Leyland Atlantean AN68 in July 2013

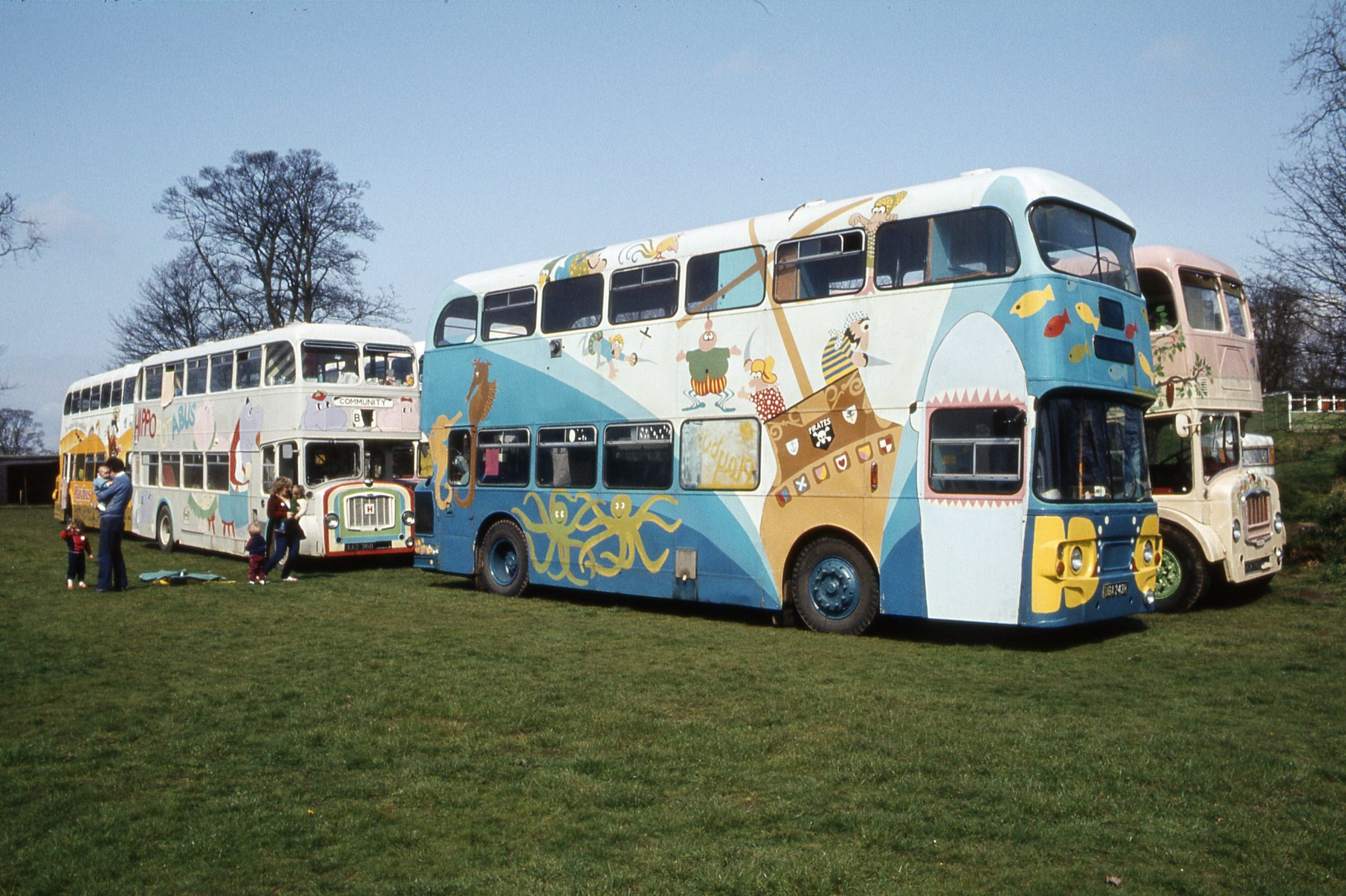
Multiple play buses at a rally in April 1983

== See also ==
- Bookmobile
- Biobus
