= Goals on Sunday (1989 TV programme) =

- Developed by: Yorkshire Television
- Presented by: Nick Powell; John Shires
- Country of origin: United Kingdom
- Original language: English

Production
- Running time: 30 minutes

Original release
- Network: ITV
- Release: 8 October 1989 – 22 April 2002

Goals on Sunday is a British football highlights television programme which aired on the ITV Yorkshire Television region initially between 1989 and 1992 in its first format, and then again from 1992 to 2002.

== Original Format ==
The show was a 30-minute programme featuring action from Saturday's games featuring the region's teams in top four divisions beginning with a main 10-minute featured match, mostly commentated by John Helm and presented by Nick Powell. Leeds United or one of the Sheffield teams (Wednesday or United) were usually featured in the main game with interviews with players and managers afterwards.

With the formation of the Premier League in 1992 Sky Sports won the rights to show the games meaning the show continued showing games from the Second, Third and Fourth levels. The last show aired on the final weekend of the 2001–02 season.

== History ==
The show was usually shown in a mid day slot on Sunday lunchtime showing the previous days Football highlights. Teams featured were from the Yorkshire Television region's, the area covered all of Yorkshire and Lincolnshire including a small number of sides from neighbouring Derbyshire and Nottinghamshire that are situated close to the borders with Yorkshire.

From 1992 to 1993 when ITV lost the rights to show First Division matches to Sky Sports, whilst highlights rights were given to the BBC for their Match of the Day show. The highlights and any live match feature would initially go out under the title Your Match. but the name "Goals on Sunday" was revived. There were also live Football League games, that featured teams in the second tier, were shown until 2002 called "Goals on Sunday: Live".

The show was replaced by Soccer Night which featured the Yorkshire TV region's Football League clubs until 2004.

== Teams featured ==
Team	Years Featured	Notes
Barnsley	1989–1997, 1998–2002	Promoted to the Premier League in 1997, highlights shown by Sky Sports and BBC
Bradford City	1989–1999, 2001–2002	Promoted to the Premier League in 1999, highlights shown by Sky Sports and BBC
Chesterfield	1989–2002	
Doncaster Rovers	1989–1998	Relegated to Non-League football in 1998.
Grimsby Town	1989–2002	
Halifax Town	1989–1993, 1998–2002	Relegated to Non-League football in 1993 and returned in 1998.
Huddersfield Town	1989–2002	
Hull City	1989–2002	
Leeds United	1989–1992	Founding member of the Premier League in 1992.
Lincoln City	1989–2002	
Mansfield Town	1989–2002	
Rotherham United	1989–2002	
Scarborough	1989–1999	Relegated to Non-League football in 1999.
Scunthorpe United	1989–2002	
Sheffield United	1989–1992, 1994–2002	Founding member of the Premier League in 1992, relegated in 1994.
Sheffield Wednesday	1989–1992, 2000–2002	Founding member of the Premier League in 1992, relegated in 2000.
York City	1989–2002	
