= The Ginger Tree =

1977 novel by Oswald Wynd

- First UK edition (publ. Collins)
- Author: Oswald Wynd
- Language: English
- Publisher: William Collins, Sons
- Publication date: 1977
- ISBN: 0-00-222261-2 (first edition)
- Dewey Decimal: 823.914
- LC Class: PZ3.W986 Gi

The Ginger Tree is a 1977 novel by Scottish novelist Oswald Wynd published in the UK by Collins Publishers. The novel was adapted into a 4-part TV series by the BBC and Japan's NHK for release in 1989, and subsequently shown as part of PBS's Masterpiece Theatre. Because of the adaptation, the novel became Wynd's most famous. The novel follows a Scottish woman who falls in love with a Japanese Count, and naval officer, and the culture of Japan, following her from 1903 to 1942. She gives birth to the Count's illegitimate child and goes on after the child's abduction to work in a leading Japanese department store as the first western saleswoman. She later sets up her own store, only to be forced to leave when Japan becomes involved in war.

== Reception ==
Kirkus Reviews was very positive about the novel, writing "Wynd maneuvers skillfully among Chinese and Japanese mores and landscapes--an acute selection from the author's apparently vast, engaged knowledge of the East. A completely diverting and moving tracery of the hardening destiny of a nation and the quiet shriveling of one heart."
