= Gina Bellman =

British actress (born 1966)

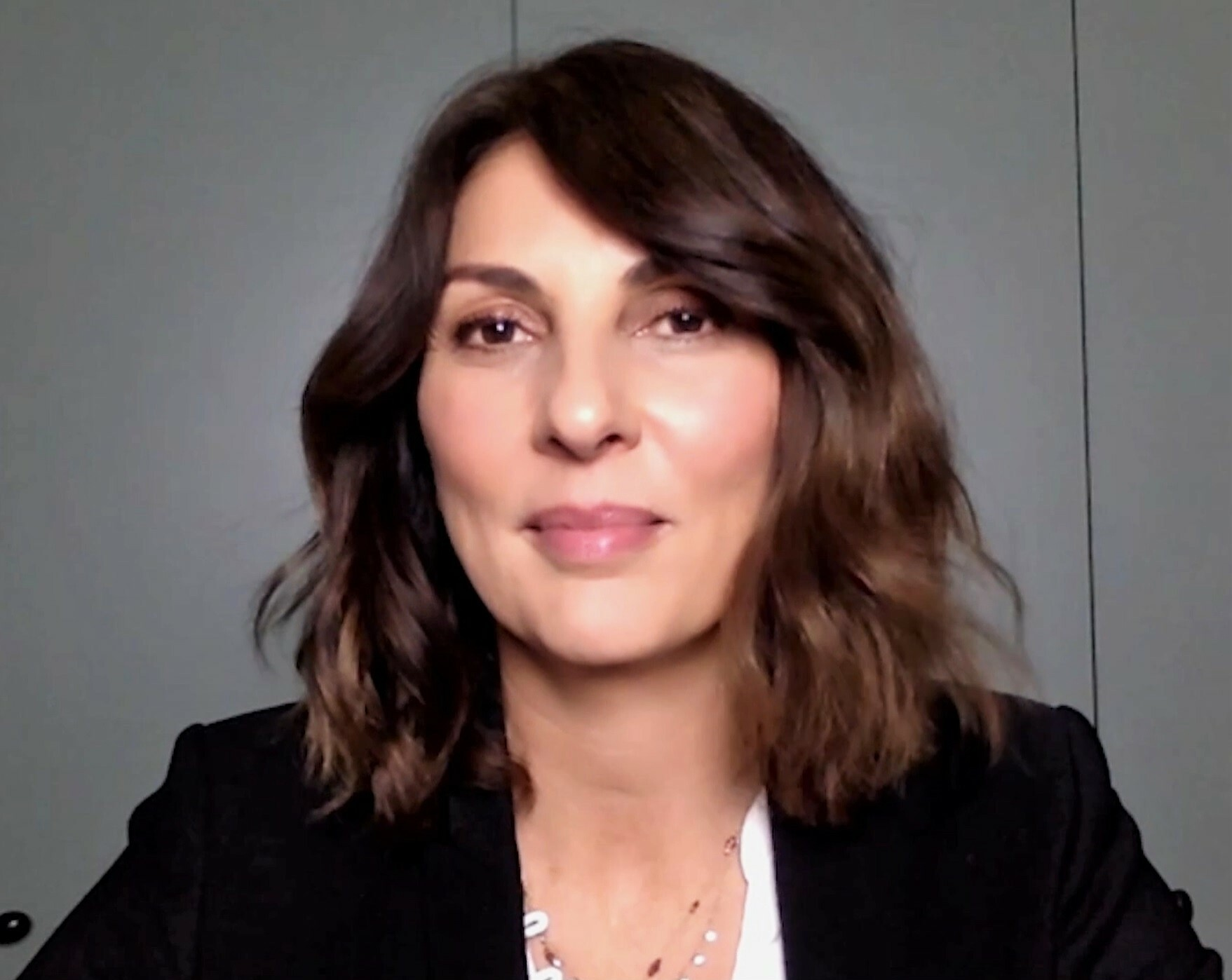
- Bellman in 2023
- Born: 1966 (age 59–60); Auckland, New Zealand
- Occupation: Actress
- Years active: 1982–present
- Spouses: Lucho Brieva (m. 2005; div. 2007) Zaab Sethna (m. 2013)
- Children: 1

Gina Bellman (born 1966) is a New Zealand-born British actress. She played grifter Sophie Devereaux in the TNT television series Leverage (2008–2012) and its Amazon Freevee revival Leverage: Redemption (2021–2025), as well as Jane Christie in the BBC sitcom Coupling (2000–2004).

== Early life ==
Bellman was born in Auckland, New Zealand, to Jewish parents of Russian and Polish descent who emigrated to New Zealand from the United Kingdom in the 1950s. Her family returned to Britain when she was 11 years old. She was educated at Rosh Pinah Primary School and JFS in London.

== Career ==
After making her television acting debut in an episode of Into the Labyrinth in 1982, and a two-episode stint in Grange Hill in 1984, she became a household name for her performance in the title role in Dennis Potter's drama Blackeyes. She is also well known for playing Jane in the sitcom Coupling. Her other TV roles include Waking the Dead, Jonathan Creek, Little Napoleons, and one-off appearances in Only Fools and Horses and Hotel Babylon.

She has also appeared in several feature films including King David (1985), which starred Richard Gere and Edward Woodward, Secret Friends (1991), Leon the Pig Farmer (1992), and Silent Trigger (1996) opposite Dolph Lundgren.

She co-starred alongside James Nesbitt in the 2007 BBC One drama serial Jekyll, a modern-day sequel to Robert Louis Stevenson's Strange Case of Dr Jekyll and Mr Hyde, written by Coupling author Steven Moffat.

In 2008, she began appearing on the TNT channel's serial drama Leverage, starring Timothy Hutton, for which she was nominated for a Saturn Award for Best Supporting Actress in Television, but lost to Lucy Lawless.

In 2013, Bellman narrated poetry for The Love Book App, an interactive anthology of love literature developed by Allie Byrne Esiri. In late 2013, she played the role of "The Italian Woman" in the National Theatre's production of the Georg Kaiser play From Morning to Midnight.

Since 2021, Bellman has reprised the role of Sophie Deveraux in Leverage: Redemption, a revival of Leverage.

== Personal life ==
From 2005 to 2007, Bellman was married to Lucho Brieva.

In 2009, she had a daughter with Zaab Sethna, whom she met just after shooting the Leverage pilot. She and Sethna married in 2013.

== Filmography ==
Film
Year	Film	Role	Notes
1985	King David	Tamar	
1985	Mussolini: The Untold Story	Gina Ruberti	(television mini-series)
1991	Secret Friends	Helen	
1992	Vsetko co mam rad	Ann	
1992	Leon the Pig Farmer	Lisa	
1993	Horse Opera	Sandra/Marion	
1996	Silent Trigger	Clegg "Spotter"	
1997	David	Michal	(television film)
2000	Paranoid	Eve	
2000	Seven Days to Live	Claudia	
2001	Subterrain	Junkie Spirit	
2001	Married/Unmarried	Amanda	
2003	Sitting Ducks	Christine	
2005	Zerophilia	Sydney	
2007	Permanent Vacation	Kathleen Bury	
2026	Perfect Wedding Days	Michelle	
Television
Year	Title	Role	Notes
1982	Into the Labyrinth	Christine	Episode: Phantom
1984	Grange Hill	Trudy	Episode: 7.8; Episode: 7.9
1989	Only Fools and Horses	Carmen	Episode: The Unlucky Winner Is...
1989	Screen Two	Greta	Episode: Sitting Targets
1989	Blackeyes	Blackeyes	4 Episodes
1991	The Storyteller	Eurydice	Episode: Orpheus and Eurydice
1994	Little Napoleons	Liz Blakemore	Episode: The Big Interview
1996	Scene	Athene Nike/Trainer	Episode: Young Jung
1996	Sharman	Kiki	Episode 1.1
1998	Ted and Ralph	Henrietta Spain	Television film
1999	Jonathan Creek	Samantha	Episode: Ghost's Forge
2000–2004	Coupling	Jane Christie	28 episodes
2003	Waking the Dead	Frannie Henning	Episode: Final Cut: Part 1 Episode: Final Cut: Part 2
2005	The Last Detective	Caroline	Episode: Friends Reunited
2007	Hotel Babylon	Marina Stoll	Episode: 2.2 (BBC television drama)
2007	Jekyll	Claire Jackman	6 episodes
2007	Nearly Famous	Traci Reed	Episode: 1.1; Episode: 1.2; Episode: 1.4
2007	Heroes and Villains	Catherine Carteaux	Episode: Napoleon (television docudrama)
2008	The Wrong Door	Pilot Instructor/Jill	Episode: Njarnia; Episode: The Smutty Aliens
2008–2012	Leverage	Sophie Devereaux	72 episodes
2013	Ripper Street	Jemima Swann	Series 2, episode 6
2017	Emerald City	Karen	5 episodes
2017	Henry IX	Lady Leonara	Series 1 All Episodes
2021–2025	Leverage: Redemption	Sophie Devereaux	Main role
2022	Toast of Tinseltown	Shepherd Jerbil	The Scorecard, S1, Ep3
Theatre
Year	Title	Role	Notes
1990	The Rocky Horror Show	Janet Weiss	Piccadilly Theatre
1994	Hamlet	Ophelia	Gielgud Theatre
1998	Cleo, Camping, Emmanuelle and Dick	Imogen	National Theatre
2000	Speed-the-Plow	Karen	Duke of York's Theatre
2013	From Morning to Midnight	Italian Lady/Salvation Army Officer	National Theatre https://theatricalia.com/person/182b/gina-bellman
2015	Orson's Shadow	Vivien Leigh	Southwark Playhouse
