= Saturday Matters with Sue Lawley =

- Genre: Talk show
- Directed by: John Kaye Cooper
- Presented by: Sue Lawley
- Country of origin: United Kingdom
- Original language: English
- No. of series: 1
- No. of episodes: 10

Production
- Running time: 45 minutes
- Production company: BBC

Original release
- Network: BBC One
- Release: 9 September – 10 November 1989

Saturday Matters with Sue Lawley is a late night chat show presented by Sue Lawley, which aired on BBC One between 9 September and 10 November 1989. It was originally intended as a breakout show for Lawley, who up until that point was best known as a BBC news presenter, although she had already proven her ability as a chat show host through being a regular stand-in for Terry Wogan on his own chat show, Wogan.

Saturday Matters departed from the format of traditional, light entertainment-oriented contemporary talk shows of the period such as Aspel and Company, Parkinson and the aforementioned Wogan, in that it invited the guests also to discuss topics of current affairs as well as their own lives. The first guest was the then Duchess of York, Sarah Ferguson. Two days after the show aired, Ferguson revealed that she was pregnant with her second child, and the show and Lawley were criticised for not having discovered this as part of the interview.

The show was cancelled after one series.
