= Oswald Wynd =

Scottish writer

Oswald Morris Wynd
- Born: July 4, 1913; Tokyo, Japan
- Died: July 21, 1998 (aged 85); Dundee, Scotland
- Education: University of Edinburgh
- Occupation: Writer
- Writing career
- Pen name: Gavin Black
- Notable work: The Ginger Tree

Oswald Morris Wynd (1913–1998) was a Scottish writer. He is best known for his novel The Ginger Tree, which was adapted into a BBC televised mini-series in 1989.

== Biography ==
Wynd was born 4 July 1913 in Tokyo of parents who had left their native Perth, Scotland to run a mission in Japan. He attended schools in Japan where he grew up speaking both English and Japanese. In 1932, he returned with his parents to Scotland and studied at the University of Edinburgh. With the advent of World War II he joined the Scots Guards but due to his language ability was commissioned into the Intelligence Corps and sent to Malaya. At the time of the Japanese invasion in Malaya, he was attached to the Indian Army on the east coast, and his brigade covered the final withdrawal to Singapore. Cut off by the Japanese advance, he was lost alone for a week in the Johor jungle. Eventually he was captured and spent more than three years as a prisoner of war in Hokkaidō, Japan, during which time he was mentioned in dispatches for his work as an interpreter for prisoners. He was interned at Hokkaido Main Camp, where, with three others, he was put to work on a Japanese phrase book for British prisoners of war. In June 1945 he was transferred to Bibai coal-mining camp.

During his last year as a prisoner of war, Wynd began writing a novel entitled Black Fountains. In 1947, the book, which details the experiences and impressions of a young American-educated Japanese girl recently returned to Japan as WWII unfolds, collected the first-novel Doubleday Prize and its $20,000 monetary award.

After the war Wynd returned to Scotland, after having spent some twenty-three years of his life in the Far East. He swore never to return. Living in Scotland, first on an island in the Hebrides, then to a house overlooking the harbor in Crail, in Fife, he produced a steady stream of books, including the much admired The Ginger Tree and a series of highly successful thrillers under the pseudonym of 'Gavin Black'.

In the late 1980s The Ginger Tree was turned into a television series by the BBC, with NHK, Japan and WGBH Boston, starring Samantha Bond as the protagonist.

Wynd died 21 July 1998 in Dundee, Scotland. He was 85.

== Books ==
=== Mainstream and suspense novels as Oswald Wynd ===
- The Black Fountains. (New York: Doubleday & Co., 1947; London: Home & Van Thal, 1948)
- Red Sun South. (New York: Doubleday & Co., 1948)
- The Stubborn Flower. (London: Michael Joseph, 1949)
- Stars in the Heather. (Blackwoods, 1956). Serialised as "The Maid of Glenharris". The Weekly Scotsman, 1955
- Moon of the Tiger. (Cassell & Co., 1958)
- A Price Before Murder. (Toronto: Star Weekly, 1960)
- Summer Can't Last. (London: Cassell & Co., 1960)
- The Devil Came on Sunday. (London: Cassell & Co., 1961)
- Death the Red Flower. (London: Cassell & Co., 1968; New York: Harcourt, Brace & World, 1965)
- Walk Softly, Men Praying. (London: Cassell & Co., 1967)
- Sumatra Seven Zero. (London: Cassell & Co., 1968; New York: Harcourt, Brace & World, 1968)
- The Forty Days. (London: Collins, 1972; New York: Harcourt Brace Jovanovich, 1972)
- The Ginger Tree. (London: William Collins Sons & Co., 1977; New York: Harper & Row, 1977)
- The Blazing Air. (London: Ticknor & Fields, 1981; New York: Houghton Mifflin Harcourt, 1981)

Fantasy

- When Ape Was King. (London: Home & Van Thal, 1949)

=== As 'Gavin Black' ===
==== Novels (Thrillers) ====
Paul Harris:

- Suddenly at Singapore (1961)
- Dead Man Calling (1962)
- A Dragon for Christmas (1963)
- The Eyes Around Me (1964)
- You Want to Die, Johnny? (1966)
- A Wind of Death (1967)
- The Cold Jungle (1969)
- A Time for Pirates (1971)
- The Bitter Tea (1972)
- The Golden Cockatrice (1974)
- A Big Wind for Summer (1975), also published as Gale Force
- A Moon for Killers (1976), also published as Killer Moon
- Night Run from Java (1979)

Other:

- The Fatal Shadow
- A Path for Serpents

==== Television ====
- Killer Lie Waiting. BBC Television, 8 April 1963
