= James Everingham =

British film composer and music producer

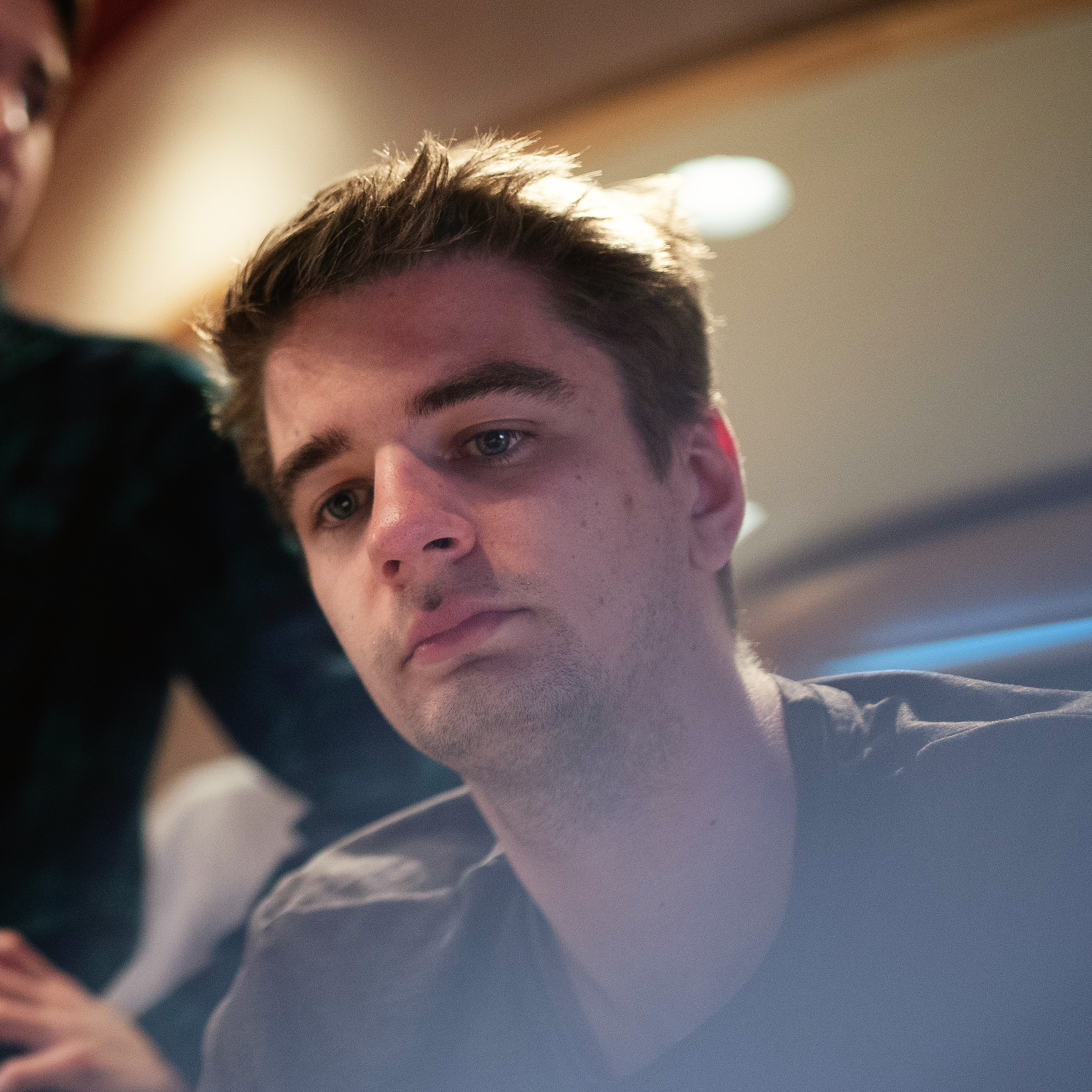

Background information
- Born: Bristol, United Kingdom
- Genres: Film scores, video game score
- Occupations: Composer; music producer
- Years active: 2013–present
- Website: jameseveringham.com

James Everingham is a British film and television composer and music producer based in Los Angeles. Everingham’s scores include Chief of War, The Blue Angels, Frozen Planet II, Apollo: Missions to the Moon, The Real Right Stuff and Robin and the Hoods. Everingham has collaborated with Hans Zimmer and Bleeding Fingers Music on multiple projects including the BBC series Virdee, and on music for American YouTuber MrBeast. In 2023, Everingham contributed music to NBC’s Super Bowl LVI show open. The music features an NFL-style drumline and underscore’s actress Halle Berry’s introduction to the sporting event.

== Career ==
On 27 August 2022, as part of the pre-launch publicity for Frozen Planet II, it was revealed that vocals by Norwegian singer-songwriter Aurora would feature as part of the music written for the series by Everingham, Hans Zimmer and Adam Lukas.

In 2023, Everingham composed the music for Encounter Dinosaurs, a free app developed by Apple and Fairview Portals that shipped with Vision Pro.

In February 2024, it was announced that Everingham would be composing the score for the BBC series Virdee, co-composing the main theme with Hans Zimmer and featuring Indian music composer Shashwat Sachdev. The six-part series is adapted for the screen by AA Dhand and is produced by Magical Society for BBC One.

Everingham also co-composed the score for the Apple TV+ series Chief of War alongside Hans Zimmer. Everingham and Zimmer worked with musician Kaumakaiwa Kanakaʻole and incorporated traditional instruments.

== Sample libraries ==
Everingham has also produced a number of virtual instrument sample libraries used for music production. In 2017, Everingham collaborated with developer Fracture Sounds, on a sample library instrument of his family’s Wilh. Steinberg upright piano, titled Woodchester Piano.

During the production of Frozen Planet II, Everingham worked with British music technology company Spitfire Audio on the development of Fractured Strings. Recorded at the London’s AIR Studios with an eight-piece string ensemble and two soloists, the library was designed to demonstrate the musical gestures of a chamber ensemble, offering inspiring and surprising intervallic and modal possibilities.

In 2020, while the Royal Albert Hall was closed due to COVID-19, Everingham led a team in the sampling and recording of the Royal Albert Hall Organ. Microphones were placed around the auditorium, including a binaural microphone placed inside the royal box. These recordings were then edited and developed such that composers can play the pre-registered organ as a virtual instrument within a digital audio workstation, using the Native Instruments Kontakt platform. Royal Albert Hall Organ was publicly released on 5 April 2022.

== Discography ==
=== Film ===
Year	Title	Director	Notes
2020	Heroes	Manish Pandey	–
2023	Arctic: Our Frozen Planet	Rachel Scott	Co-composed with Hans Zimmer and Adam Lukas
2023	Shimmy: The First Monkey King	Dick Zondag, Ralph Zondag	–
2024	The Blue Angels	Paul Crowder	Co-composed with Stewart Mitchell
2024	Robin and the Hoods	Phil Hawkins	–

=== Television ===
Year	Title	Network	Notes
2018	Grand Prix Driver	Amazon Prime Video	Additional music only
2019	Apollo: Missions to the Moon	National Geographic	Score produced by Hans Zimmer and Russell Emanuel
2020	Expedition Everest	National Geographic	Co-composed with Adam Lukas
2020	Kingdom of the Mummies	National Geographic	Co-composed with Laurentia Editha
2020	The Real Right Stuff	Disney+	Score produced by Hans Zimmer and Russell Emanuel
2020	Planet Earth: A Celebration	BBC	Additional music only
2020	Mars: One Day on the Red Planet	National Geographic	Additional music only
2020	The Reagans	Showtime	Additional music only
2020	Okavango: A Flood of Life	NHK	Co-composed with Anže Rozman
2021	Flooded Tombs of the Nile	National Geographic	Co-composed with Adam Lukas
2022	Frozen Planet II	BBC	Co-composed with Hans Zimmer and Adam Lukas
2022	Super Bowl LVI	NBC	NBC show open co-composed with Adam Lukas
2022	Earthstorm	Netflix	Additional music only
2023	Charles: In His Own Words	Disney+	Theme music only
2024	Virdee	BBC	Main theme co-composed with Hans Zimmer featuring Shashwat Sachdev
2025	Chief of War	Apple TV+	Co-composed with Hans Zimmer

=== Video games ===
Year	Title	Publisher	Notes
2022	Minecraft: Frozen Planet 2	Mojang Studios	Co-composed with Adam Lukas Released in association with Minecraft Education and BBC Earth
2024	Minecraft: Whimsical Compilation	Microsoft	–

=== Songwriting and production ===
Year	Song	Album	Artist	Label	Credits	Notes
2016	"Dream Sequence"	Futurist	Keeno	MedSchool	Co-producer	–
2018	"The Vow (James Everingham Orchestral Mix)"	–	RuthAnne	The Other Songs	Arranger/co-producer	Single
2018	"Aurora"	Chasm	Tony Anderson	–	Arranger/co-producer	–
2020	"Waking Up"	Waking Up	Little Dume	–	Co-producer	EP
2020	"The One"	Memories	Youngr	Armada Music	Co-writer, co-producer	–
