= Höhnel =

Höhnel is a surname. Notable people with the surname include:

- Franz Xaver Rudolf von Höhnel (1852–1920), Austrian bryologist, mycologist and algologist, brother of Ludwig
- Ludwig von Höhnel (1857–1942), Austrian naval officer and explorer
