= List of Disney theatrical animated feature films =

Logos of Walt Disney Animation Studios, Pixar Animation Studios and 20th Century Studios' animation division, Disney's three major animation studios

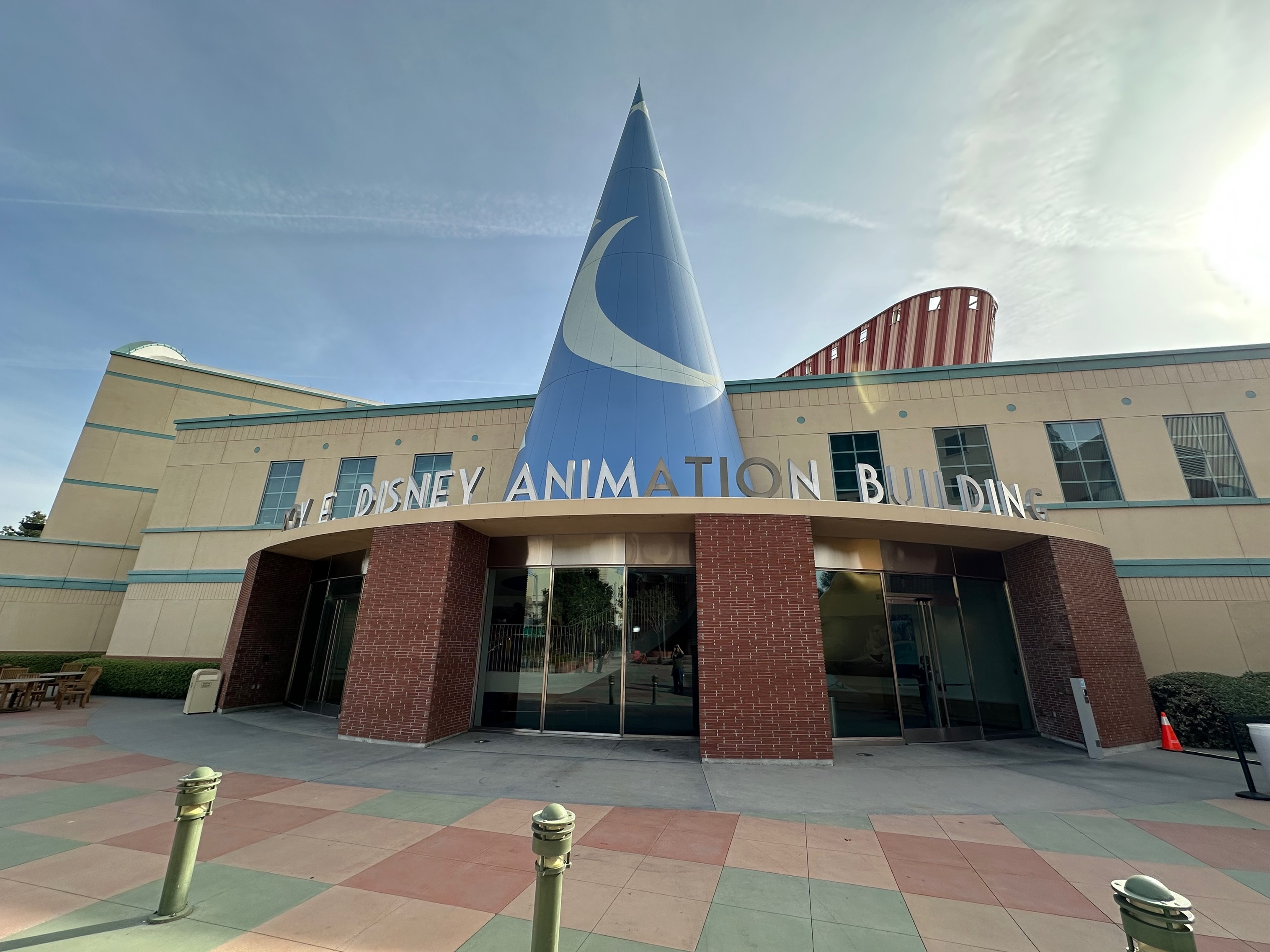
Walt Disney Animation Studios' headquarters at the Roy E. Disney Animation Building in Burbank

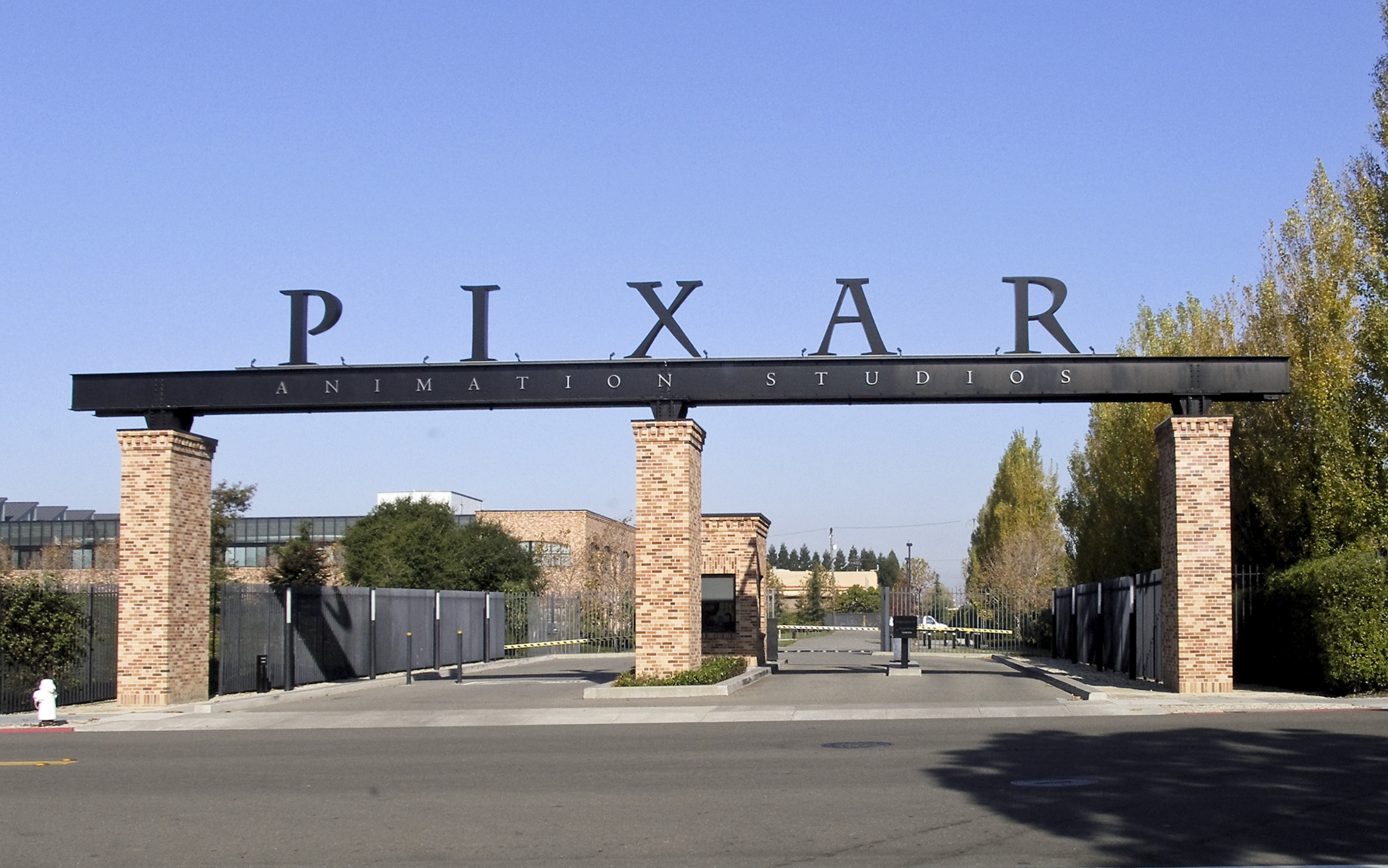
Pixar headquarters in Emeryville, California

This list of theatrical animated feature films consists of animated films produced or released by The Walt Disney Studios, the film division of The Walt Disney Company. (Note: This list does not include films or specials streamed on Disney+ as Disney+ Originals.) (Note: Before arriving at its current name, The Walt Disney Company has operated under such titles as 'Disney Brothers Cartoon Studio', 'The Walt Disney Studio' (not to be confused with the division), and 'Walt Disney Productions'.)

The Walt Disney Studios releases films from Disney-owned and non-Disney-owned animation studios. Most films listed below are from Walt Disney Animation Studios, which began as the feature-animation department of Walt Disney Productions, producing its first feature-length animated film Snow White and the Seven Dwarfs in 1937, as of November 2025, it has produced a total of 64 feature films. (Note: Animated films that are listed as produced by Walt Disney were either entirely produced prior to 1986 as part of the animation department of Walt Disney Productions or by the restructured studio unit Walt Disney Feature Animation, known after 2006 as Walt Disney Animation Studios. Some films may have been animated at various satellite animation studios as well.) Beginning with Toy Story in 1995, The Walt Disney Studios has also released animated films by Pixar Animation Studios, which Disney would eventually acquire in 2006. In 2019, as part of its acquisition of 21st Century Fox, The Walt Disney Studios acquired Blue Sky Studios (now closed down in 2021), as well as 20th Century Fox Animation (now simply 20th Century Animation) which operates as a label and the animation division of 20th Century Fox (now 20th Century Studios).

Other studio units have also released films theatrically, namely, Walt Disney Television Animation's Disney MovieToons/Video Premiere unit (later renamed Disneytoon Studios) and the studio's distribution unit, which acquires film rights from outside animation studios to release films under the Walt Disney Pictures, 20th Century Studios, Touchstone Pictures, and Miramax film labels.

== Films ==
Color legend
Walt Disney Productions (1937–1985); Walt Disney Animation (1986–1992); Walt Disney Feature Animation (1994–2006); Walt Disney Animation Studios (2007–present)	
Pixar Animation Studios (1995–present)	
20th Century Fox Animation (2019); 20th Century Animation (2021–present)	
Disney MovieToons (1990); Disney Video Premieres (1995–2002); Disneytoon Studios (2003–2015)	
Walt Disney Television Animation (1999–2004)	
Other Disney studio	
Third-party studio	
Live-action/animation hybrid sold as animation	^{S}
Live-action/animation hybrid sold as live-action	^{SL}
Live-action/animation hybrid sold as documentary	^{SD}
Distribution only	^{D}

=== American releases / American produced ===
==== Released ====
Title	Original U.S. theatrical release date (Note: Listed are the original theatrical release dates in the United States (or other non-U.S. territories) when the film was contributed by the Walt Disney Company. Different distributors are attributed and credited for distributing each film throughout the history of the Walt Disney Company. Films released before 1954 were released by RKO Radio Pictures (with the exception of Victory Through Air Power, refused by RKO and then released by United Artists); films released after 1955 were released by Disney-owned Buena Vista Distribution and through its current name Walt Disney Studios Motion Pictures (since 2007); and films released after 1985 are co-credited with Walt Disney Pictures.)	Production company
Snow White and the Seven Dwarfs	December 21, 1937	Walt Disney Productions and RKO Radio Pictures
Pinocchio	February 7, 1940	Walt Disney Productions and RKO Radio Pictures
Fantasia^{[S]}	November 13, 1940 (Note: Originally distributed by Walt Disney Productions. Original RKO date of release was January 29, 1941)	Walt Disney Productions and RKO Radio Pictures
The Reluctant Dragon^{[SL]}	June 20, 1941	Walt Disney Productions and RKO Radio Pictures
Dumbo	October 23, 1941	Walt Disney Productions and RKO Radio Pictures
Bambi	August 13, 1942	Walt Disney Productions and RKO Radio Pictures
Saludos Amigos^{[S]}	August 24, 1942	Walt Disney Productions and RKO Radio Pictures
Victory Through Air Power^{[SL]}	July 17, 1943	Walt Disney Productions and United Artists
The Three Caballeros^{[S]}	December 21, 1944	Walt Disney Productions and RKO Radio Pictures
Make Mine Music	April 20, 1946	Walt Disney Productions and RKO Radio Pictures
Song of the South^{[SL]}	November 20, 1946	Walt Disney Productions and RKO Radio Pictures
Fun and Fancy Free^{[S]}	September 27, 1947	Walt Disney Productions and RKO Radio Pictures
Melody Time^{[S]}	May 27, 1948	Walt Disney Productions and RKO Radio Pictures
So Dear to My Heart^{[SL]}	November 29, 1948	Walt Disney Productions and RKO Radio Pictures
The Adventures of Ichabod and Mr. Toad	October 5, 1949	Walt Disney Productions and RKO Radio Pictures
Cinderella	February 15, 1950	Walt Disney Productions and RKO Radio Pictures
Alice in Wonderland	July 28, 1951	Walt Disney Productions and RKO Radio Pictures
Peter Pan	February 5, 1953	Walt Disney Productions and RKO Radio Pictures
Lady and the Tramp	June 22, 1955	Walt Disney Productions and Buena Vista Film Distribution
Sleeping Beauty	January 29, 1959	Walt Disney Productions and Buena Vista Film Distribution
One Hundred and One Dalmatians	January 25, 1961	Walt Disney Productions and Buena Vista Film Distribution
The Sword in the Stone	December 25, 1963	Walt Disney Productions and Buena Vista Film Distribution
Mary Poppins^{[SL]}	August 27, 1964	Walt Disney Productions and Buena Vista Film Distribution
The Jungle Book	October 18, 1967	Walt Disney Productions and Buena Vista Film Distribution
The Aristocats	December 24, 1970	Walt Disney Productions and Buena Vista Film Distribution
Bedknobs and Broomsticks^{[SL]}	October 7, 1971	Walt Disney Productions and Buena Vista Film Distribution
Robin Hood	November 8, 1973	Walt Disney Productions and Buena Vista Film Distribution
The Many Adventures of Winnie the Pooh^{[S]}	March 11, 1977	Walt Disney Productions and Buena Vista Film Distribution
The Rescuers	June 22, 1977	Walt Disney Productions and Buena Vista Film Distribution
Pete's Dragon^{[SL]}	November 3, 1977	Walt Disney Productions and Buena Vista Film Distribution
The Fox and the Hound	July 10, 1981	Walt Disney Productions and Buena Vista Film Distribution
The Black Cauldron	July 24, 1985	Walt Disney Pictures, Walt Disney Productions and Silver Screen Partners II
The Great Mouse Detective	July 2, 1986	Walt Disney Pictures, Walt Disney Animation and Silver Screen Partners II
Who Framed Roger Rabbit^{[S]}	June 22, 1988	Touchstone Pictures, Amblin Entertainment and Silver Screen Partners III (Note: Copyrighted to Touchstone Pictures and Amblin Entertainment)
Oliver & Company	November 18, 1988	Walt Disney Pictures, Walt Disney Animation and Silver Screen Partners III
The Little Mermaid	November 17, 1989	Walt Disney Pictures, Walt Disney Animation and Silver Screen Partners IV
DuckTales the Movie: Treasure of the Lost Lamp	August 3, 1990	Walt Disney Pictures, Disney MovieToons
The Rescuers Down Under	November 16, 1990	Walt Disney Pictures, Walt Disney Animation and Silver Screen Partners IV
Beauty and the Beast	November 22, 1991	Walt Disney Pictures, Walt Disney Animation and Silver Screen Partners IV
Aladdin	November 25, 1992	Walt Disney Pictures, Walt Disney Animation
The Nightmare Before Christmas	October 29, 1993	Touchstone Pictures, Skellington Productions
The Lion King	June 24, 1994	Walt Disney Pictures, Walt Disney Feature Animation
A Goofy Movie	April 7, 1995	Walt Disney Pictures, Disney Video Premieres
Pocahontas	June 23, 1995	Walt Disney Pictures, Walt Disney Feature Animation
Toy Story	November 22, 1995	Walt Disney Pictures, Pixar Animation Studios
James and the Giant Peach^{[S]}	April 12, 1996	Walt Disney Pictures, Allied Filmmakers and Skellington Productions (Note: Released by Walt Disney Pictures.)
The Hunchback of Notre Dame	June 21, 1996	Walt Disney Pictures, Walt Disney Feature Animation
Hercules	June 27, 1997	Walt Disney Pictures, Walt Disney Feature Animation
Mulan	June 19, 1998	Walt Disney Pictures, Walt Disney Feature Animation Florida
A Bug's Life	November 25, 1998	Walt Disney Pictures, Pixar Animation Studios
Doug's 1st Movie	March 26, 1999	Walt Disney Pictures, Walt Disney Television Animation and Jumbo Pictures (Note: Copyrighted to Jumbo Pictures)
Tarzan	June 18, 1999	Walt Disney Pictures, Walt Disney Feature Animation
Toy Story 2	November 24, 1999	Walt Disney Pictures, Pixar Animation Studios
Fantasia 2000^{[S]}	December 17, 1999	Walt Disney Pictures, Walt Disney Feature Animation
The Tigger Movie	February 11, 2000	Walt Disney Pictures, Walt Disney Television Animation and Walt Disney Animation Japan
Dinosaur	May 19, 2000	Walt Disney Pictures, Walt Disney Feature Animation and The Secret Lab
The Emperor's New Groove	December 15, 2000	Walt Disney Pictures, Walt Disney Feature Animation
Recess: School's Out	February 16, 2001	Walt Disney Pictures, Walt Disney Television Animation and Paul & Joe Productions
Atlantis: The Lost Empire	June 15, 2001	Walt Disney Pictures, Walt Disney Feature Animation
Monsters, Inc.	November 2, 2001	Walt Disney Pictures, Pixar Animation Studios
Return to Never Land	February 15, 2002	Walt Disney Pictures, Disney Video Premieres, Disney Television Animation
Lilo & Stitch	June 21, 2002	Walt Disney Pictures, Walt Disney Feature Animation Florida
Treasure Planet	November 27, 2002	Walt Disney Pictures, Walt Disney Feature Animation
The Jungle Book 2	February 14, 2003	Walt Disney Pictures, Disneytoon Studios
Piglet's Big Movie	March 21, 2003	Walt Disney Pictures, Disneytoon Studios
The Lizzie McGuire Movie^{[SL]}	May 2, 2003	Walt Disney Pictures, Stan Rogow Productions
Finding Nemo	May 30, 2003	Walt Disney Pictures, Pixar Animation Studios
Brother Bear	November 1, 2003	Walt Disney Pictures, Walt Disney Feature Animation Florida
Teacher's Pet	January 16, 2004	Walt Disney Pictures, Walt Disney Television Animation
Home on the Range	April 2, 2004	Walt Disney Pictures, Walt Disney Feature Animation
The Incredibles	November 5, 2004	Walt Disney Pictures, Pixar Animation Studios
Pooh's Heffalump Movie	February 11, 2005	Walt Disney Pictures, Disneytoon Studios
Valiant^{[D]}	August 19, 2005 (Note: Released by Walt Disney Pictures in North America)	Vanguard Animation (Note: Vanguard Animation retains copyright on the film) and Ealing Studios
Chicken Little	November 4, 2005	Walt Disney Pictures, Walt Disney Feature Animation
The Wild	April 14, 2006	Walt Disney Pictures, (Note: Disney retains copyright on the film) C.O.R.E. Feature Animation, Hoytyboy Pictures, Sir Zip Productions and Contrafilm
Cars	June 9, 2006	Walt Disney Pictures, Pixar Animation Studios
Meet the Robinsons	March 30, 2007	Walt Disney Pictures, Walt Disney Animation Studios
Ratatouille	June 29, 2007	Walt Disney Pictures, Pixar Animation Studios
Enchanted^{[SL]}	November 21, 2007	Walt Disney Pictures, Josephson Entertainment, Andalasia Productions and Right Coast Productions
WALL-E^{[S]}	June 27, 2008	Walt Disney Pictures, Pixar Animation Studios
Bolt	November 21, 2008	Walt Disney Pictures, Walt Disney Animation Studios
Up	May 29, 2009	Walt Disney Pictures, Pixar Animation Studios
A Christmas Carol^{[S]}	November 6, 2009	Walt Disney Pictures, ImageMovers Digital (Note: Copyrighted to ImageMovers Digital) (Note: The film studio ImageMovers Digital, run by Robert Zemeckis, was owned by Disney from 2007 to 2010. These films were motion capture animated films.)
The Princess and the Frog	December 11, 2009	Walt Disney Pictures, Walt Disney Animation Studios
Toy Story 3	June 18, 2010	Walt Disney Pictures, Pixar Animation Studios
Tangled	November 24, 2010	Walt Disney Pictures, Walt Disney Animation Studios
Gnomeo & Juliet^{[D]}	February 11, 2011	Touchstone Pictures, Starz Animation and Rocket Pictures (Note: Copyrighted to Miramax)
Mars Needs Moms^{[S]}	March 11, 2011	Walt Disney Pictures, ImageMovers Digital
Cars 2	June 24, 2011	Walt Disney Pictures, Pixar Animation Studios
Winnie the Pooh^{[S]}	July 15, 2011	Walt Disney Pictures, Walt Disney Animation Studios
Brave	June 22, 2012	Walt Disney Pictures, Pixar Animation Studios
Frankenweenie	October 5, 2012	Walt Disney Pictures, Tim Burton Productions
Wreck-It Ralph	November 2, 2012	Walt Disney Pictures, Walt Disney Animation Studios
Monsters University	June 21, 2013	Walt Disney Pictures, Pixar Animation Studios
Planes	August 9, 2013	Walt Disney Pictures, Disneytoon Studios
Frozen	November 27, 2013	Walt Disney Pictures, Walt Disney Animation Studios
Planes: Fire & Rescue	July 18, 2014	Walt Disney Pictures, Disneytoon Studios
Big Hero 6	November 7, 2014	Walt Disney Pictures, Walt Disney Animation Studios
Strange Magic	January 23, 2015	Touchstone Pictures, Lucasfilm Animation (Note: Copyrighted to Lucasfilm)
Inside Out	June 19, 2015	Walt Disney Pictures, Pixar Animation Studios
The Good Dinosaur	November 25, 2015	Walt Disney Pictures, Pixar Animation Studios
Zootopia	March 4, 2016	Walt Disney Pictures, Walt Disney Animation Studios
Finding Dory	June 17, 2016	Walt Disney Pictures, Pixar Animation Studios
Moana	November 23, 2016	Walt Disney Pictures, Walt Disney Animation Studios
Cars 3	June 16, 2017	Walt Disney Pictures, Pixar Animation Studios
Coco	November 22, 2017	Walt Disney Pictures, Pixar Animation Studios
Incredibles 2	June 15, 2018	Walt Disney Pictures, Pixar Animation Studios
Ralph Breaks the Internet	November 21, 2018	Walt Disney Pictures, Walt Disney Animation Studios
Mary Poppins Returns^{[SL]}	December 19, 2018	Walt Disney Pictures, Lucamar Productions and Marc Platt Productions
Toy Story 4	June 21, 2019	Walt Disney Pictures, Pixar Animation Studios
The Lion King^{[SL]}	July 19, 2019	Walt Disney Pictures, Fairview Entertainment
Frozen 2	November 22, 2019	Walt Disney Pictures, Walt Disney Animation Studios
Spies in Disguise^{[D]}	December 25, 2019	20th Century Fox, 20th Century Fox Animation, Blue Sky Studios and Chernin Entertainment
Onward	March 6, 2020	Walt Disney Pictures, Pixar Animation Studios
Raya and the Last Dragon	March 5, 2021	Walt Disney Pictures, Walt Disney Animation Studios
Ron's Gone Wrong^{[D]}	October 22, 2021	20th Century Studios, 20th Century Animation, and Locksmith Animation
Encanto	November 24, 2021	Walt Disney Pictures, Walt Disney Animation Studios
The Bob's Burgers Movie	May 27, 2022	20th Century Studios, 20th Century Animation, Bento Box Entertainment and Wilo Productions
Lightyear	June 17, 2022	Walt Disney Pictures, Pixar Animation Studios
Strange World	November 23, 2022	Walt Disney Pictures, Walt Disney Animation Studios
Elemental	June 16, 2023	Walt Disney Pictures, Pixar Animation Studios
Wish	November 22, 2023	Walt Disney Pictures, Walt Disney Animation Studios
Soul^{‡}	January 12, 2024	Walt Disney Pictures, Pixar Animation Studios
Turning Red^{‡}	February 9, 2024	Walt Disney Pictures, Pixar Animation Studios
Luca^{‡}	March 22, 2024	Walt Disney Pictures, Pixar Animation Studios
Inside Out 2	June 14, 2024	Walt Disney Pictures, Pixar Animation Studios
Moana 2	November 27, 2024	Walt Disney Pictures, Walt Disney Animation Studios
Mufasa: The Lion King^{[SL]}	December 20, 2024	Walt Disney Pictures
Elio	June 20, 2025	Walt Disney Pictures, Pixar Animation Studios
Zootopia 2	November 26, 2025	Walt Disney Pictures, Walt Disney Animation Studios
Hoppers	March 6, 2026	Walt Disney Pictures, Pixar Animation Studios
Toy Story 5	June 19, 2026	Walt Disney Pictures, Pixar Animation Studios

‡—Includes theatrical reissue(s).

==== Upcoming ====
Title	Scheduled U.S. theatrical release	Production company
Hexed	November 25, 2026	Walt Disney Pictures, Walt Disney Animation Studios
Ice Age: Boiling Point	February 5, 2027	20th Century Studios, 20th Century Animation
Gatto	March 5, 2027	Walt Disney Pictures, Pixar Animation Studios
The New Simpsons Movie	September 3, 2027	20th Century Studios, 20th Century Animation, Gracie Films
Frozen 3	November 24, 2027	Walt Disney Pictures, Walt Disney Animation Studios
Ghost Market	March 10, 2028	Walt Disney Pictures, Pixar Animation Studios
Incredibles 3	June 16, 2028	Walt Disney Pictures, Pixar Animation Studios
Clay	November 22, 2028	Walt Disney Pictures, Walt Disney Animation Studios
Coco 2	November 21, 2029	Walt Disney Pictures, Pixar Animation Studios
Frozen 4	TBA	Walt Disney Pictures, Walt Disney Animation Studios
Moana 3	TBA	Walt Disney Pictures, Walt Disney Animation Studios
Zootopia 3	TBA	Walt Disney Pictures, Walt Disney Animation Studios

=== American produced films distributed by Miramax ===
The following is a list of films that were released by Miramax Films when the studio was a subsidiary of Disney at the time of release. Neither of these films is officially recognized as Disney films, as they were from pre-existing distribution deals before Disney's acquisition of Miramax, and Disney sold Miramax to Filmyard Holdings in 2010.

Film	Date of original U.S. release	Produced by	Notes
Tom and Jerry: The Movie	July 30, 1993 (Note: Original date of release was October 1, 1992)	Turner Entertainment, WMG Film, Wang Film Productions and Film Roman	Distribution right sold to Warner Bros. Pictures.
The Thief and the Cobbler (Arabian Knight)	August 25, 1995 (Note: Original date of release was September 23, 1993)	Richard Williams Productions, Fred Calvert Productions and Allied Filmmakers	

=== American produced / International releases only ===
The following films were only released direct-to-video within the US. While they were given a theatrical billboard internationally, these films are not recognized by Disney's D23 as theatrical films because of a lack of US theatrical releases.

Title	Original theatrical release date	Animation studio
The Brave Little Toaster^{[D]}	February 27, 1988 (American TV airing on The Disney Channel) (Note: Original date of release was July 10, 1987)	Hyperion Pictures and The Kushner-Locke Company (Note: Produced and originally released independently, it was funded and later distributed on television and video by Disney.)
Bambi II	January 26, 2006 (Argentina)	DisneyToon Studios
Tinker Bell	September 11, 2008 (Argentina)	DisneyToon Studios
Tinker Bell and the Lost Treasure	September 3, 2009 (Argentina) (Note: Also released by Disney outside North America) (Note: Also released by Disney in North America)	DisneyToon Studios
Tinker Bell and the Great Fairy Rescue	September 23, 2010 (Argentina)	DisneyToon Studios
Phineas and Ferb the Movie: Across the 2nd Dimension	August 31, 2011 (Spain)	Walt Disney Television Animation
Secret of the Wings	August 23, 2012 (Argentina)	DisneyToon Studios
The Pirate Fairy	February 27, 2014 (Argentina)	DisneyToon Studios
Tinker Bell and the Legend of the NeverBeast	February 12, 2015 (Argentina)	DisneyToon Studios

=== International productions / American releases ===
==== Released ====
Title	Original U.S. theatrical release date	Animation studio
Spirited Away^{[D]}	September 20, 2002 (Note: Original date of release was July 20, 2001)	Studio Ghibli
Howl's Moving Castle^{[D]}	June 10, 2005 (Note: Original date of release was November 20, 2004)	Studio Ghibli
The Secret of the Magic Gourd^{[SL]}	June 29, 2007 (China)	Centro Digital Pictures Limited
Roadside Romeo^{[D]}	October 24, 2008 (India)	Yash Raj Films (Note: Co-production with The Walt Disney Company India Pvt. Ltd.)
Ponyo^{[D]}	August 14, 2009 (Note: Original date of release was July 19, 2008)	Studio Ghibli
Tales from Earthsea^{[D]}	August 13, 2010 (Note: Original date of release was July 29, 2006)	Studio Ghibli
The Secret World of Arrietty^{[D]}	February 17, 2012 (Note: Original date of release was July 17, 2010)	Studio Ghibli
Arjun: The Warrior Prince^{[D]}	May 25, 2012 (India)	UTV Motion Pictures
The Wind Rises^{[D]}	February 21, 2014 (Note: Original date of release was July 20, 2013)	Studio Ghibli (Note: Released under the Touchstone Pictures label.)

==== Upcoming ====
Title	Scheduled U.S. theatrical release	Animation studio
The Bluey Movie^{[D]}	August 6, 2027	Ludo Studio

=== International films distributed by Miramax ===
The following is a list of films that were released by Miramax Films when the studio was a subsidiary of Disney at the time of release. None of these films are officially recognized as Disney films due to either Disney's sale of Miramax to Filmyard Holdings in 2010, or the distribution rights sold to other companies.

Film	Date of original U.S. release	Produced by	Notes
Princess Mononoke	October 29, 1999 (Note: Original date of release was July 12, 1997)	Studio Ghibli and Tokuma Shoten	(Note: Released by Buena Vista International in select territories, pre-sold outside Asia by Miramax International.) Rights given to Wild Bunch/Goodfellas outside North America in 2003, and to GKIDS in North America in 2017.
Pokémon 4Ever	October 11, 2002 (Note: Original date of release was July 7, 2001)	The Pokémon Company, Shogakukan, OLM, Inc. and Toho Co., Ltd.	Distribution rights reverted to The Pokémon Company International in 2023.
Pokémon Heroes	May 16, 2003 (Note: Original date of release was July 13, 2002)	The Pokémon Company, Shogakukan, OLM, Inc. and Toho Co., Ltd.	(Note: Released by Buena Vista Home Entertainment in select territories.); Distribution rights reverted to The Pokémon Company International in 2023.
Paris 2054: Renaissance	September 22, 2006 (Note: Original date of release was March 15, 2006)	Onyx Films, Millimages, LuxAnimation, Timefirm Limited and France 2 Cinéma	

== Highest-grossing films ==
† Background shading indicates films playing in the week commencing 18 September 2026 in theaters around the world.

Rank	Film	Worldwide gross	Studio	Year	Ref.
1	Zootopia 2	$1,866,647,950	Walt Disney Animation Studios	2025	
2	Inside Out 2	$1,698,863,816	Pixar	2024	
3	The Lion King	$1,656,943,394	Fairview Portals	2019	
4	Frozen 2	$1,450,026,933	Walt Disney Animation Studios	2019	
5	Frozen	$1,290,000,000	Walt Disney Animation Studios	2013	
6	Incredibles 2	$1,242,805,968	Pixar	2018	
7	Toy Story 5 †	$1,114,768,651	Pixar	2026	
8	Toy Story 4	$1,073,394,593	Pixar	2019	
9	Toy Story 3	$1,066,969,703	Pixar	2010	
10	Moana 2	$1,059,242,164	Walt Disney Animation Studios	2024	

== See also ==
- List of 20th Century Studios theatrical animated feature films
- List of Blue Sky Studios productions
- List of Disney Television Animation films
- List of Disneytoon Studios films
- List of Pixar films
- List of remakes and adaptations of Disney animated films
- List of Walt Disney Animation Studios films
- List of Walt Disney Pictures films

Distribution brands

- Disney Vault – Disney marketing term
- List of Disney feature-length home entertainment releases
- Walt Disney Classics – Series of VHS releases of Disney movies
- Walt Disney Home Video (VHS) – Discontinued videoline
