= Frozen Planet II =

2022 British nature documentary series

- Genre: Nature documentary
- Created by: BBC Natural History Unit
- Narrated by: David Attenborough
- Composers: Hans Zimmer; Adam Lukas; James Everingham; Anže Rozman (opening titles)
- Country of origin: United Kingdom
- Original language: English
- No. of episodes: 6

Production
- Executive producer: Mark Brownlow
- Producers: Elizabeth White; Alex Lanchester; Rachel Scott; Orla Doherty; Jane Atkins; James Reed
- Cinematography: Rolf Steinmann; Peter Cayless
- Running time: 60 minutes
- Production company: BBC Studios Natural History Unit

Original release
- Network: BBC One
- Release: 11 September – 16 October 2022

Related
- Frozen Planet; Blue Planet II; Planet Earth II

Frozen Planet II is a 2022 British nature documentary series produced by the BBC Studios Natural History Unit in co-production with The Open University, BBC America, ZDF, France Télévisions, NHK and Migu Video. It functions as a sequel to the 2011 documentary series Frozen Planet. The series is presented and narrated by Sir David Attenborough with the music composed by Hans Zimmer, Adam Lukas and James Everingham, including a theme featuring the vocals of singer-songwriter Aurora.

Whereas the original Frozen Planet series focused on life and the environment in both of the polar regions, this follow-up series broadened the scope to include the entire cryosphere, whilst also placing a greater emphasis on the threats the inhabitants of these regions face as a result of climate change.

== Production ==
The series took four and a half years to produce, and being filmed over ten years after its predecessor, Frozen Planet II took advantage of significant advances in camera, microphone and drone technology; using drones to capture live avalanches and disintegrating glaciers. Each episode, except for the last, concludes with a segment entitled Out in the Cold that highlights how some of the sequences in each episode were made.

== Broadcast ==
=== British Television ===
The series saw its British television debut on BBC One, BBC One HD and BBC iPlayer on Sunday 11 September 2022 in the 8pm to 9pm timeslot.

=== International ===
BBC Studios distributes Frozen Planet II worldwide. The company have pre-sold the documentary to various broadcasters including BBC America in North America, ZDF in Germany, France Télévisions in France, Migu Video in China, NHK in Japan, Friday! in Russia, Mediaset in Italy, KBS in South Korea, and the Nine Network in Australia.

On Sunday 18 September 2022 the series saw its network debut on BBC Earth Asia covering the nations of Brunei, Cambodia, Hong Kong, Indonesia, Laos, Malaysia, Mongolia, Myanmar, Philippines, Singapore, South Korea, Taiwan, Thailand and Vietnam.

== Episodes ==
"Looking down on our planet it may come as a surprise to find just how much of it is blanketed in snow and ice. These vast frozen wildernesses cover more than a fifth of the Earth, yet some areas are so remote and inhospitable that, even today, the closest we've come to exploring them is from space... But just as we're beginning to understand its wildlife we're recognising an alarming truth – our frozen wildernesses are disappearing, at faster rates than ever before. Never has it been more important to understand what is going on in these icy territories."

— David Attenborough's opening words

No.	Title	Produced by	Original release date	UK viewers (millions)
1	"Frozen Worlds"	Alex Lanchester	11 September 2022	5.79
We begin our journey in the far south, in the most hostile place on Earth, the frozen continent of Antarctica. After being raised on the ice in winter, emperor penguin chicks find themselves abandoned by their parents in spring. To survive, they must find their own way across the treacherous sea ice to the rich waters of the Southern Ocean. The waters surrounding Antarctica may be the richest of all, but they are also home to an exceptionally sophisticated predator, the killer whale. To reach their favoured prey, the Weddell seal, a family of killer whales have learnt to generate their own waves, washing the seals off their ice floes. It is a technique that has been passed down over generations and is coordinated by the family matriarch, who can be over 100 years old. Leaving Antarctica and travelling north, we discover frozen habitats that are created by altitude. The greatest of these is the Himalayas, the tallest mountain range on Earth, which contains so much ice and snow it is known as the third pole. In the shadow of the Himalaya lies a vast frozen grassy plain that is home to the fluffiest cat in the world, Pallas's cat. It may have extremely dense fur, but if it's to survive the Mongolian winter, it needs to catch lots of gerbils and voles. Easier said than done when you only have short legs and paws that are sensitive to the cold. North of the Great Steppe lies the boreal forest, which encircles the continents of North America, Europe and Asia, and remains frozen for six months of the year. Prowling these forests in the far east of Russia is the Siberian tiger, the largest cat in the world. In winter, it is on the lookout for black bears hibernating in caves, a high-risk strategy that only a cat of this size would attempt. North of the boreal forest, we cross into the Arctic Circle, where conditions become so extreme that trees can no longer grow. This is the tundra. Living here are relics of the last ice age, musk ox. In spring, their calves face a far greater danger than the cold, grizzly bears. Encounters can be brutal, but if just a few calves survive the gauntlet, the herd's future is secure. To the north of the tundra is the Arctic Ocean, the only ocean that can completely freeze over. Living here is one of the most peculiar animals on Earth, the hooded seal. Males have extraordinary inflatable noses, producing a bright red balloon out of their left nostrils. One male hopes this will make him irresistible. All of the frozen habitats share one thing in common: the threat posed by today's climate change. Travelling to the island of Greenland, home to the largest body of ice in the northern hemisphere, we witness how global warming is melting its ice cap at faster rates than ever before, with profound consequences for global sea levels. Lastly, we visit the Arctic's most iconic resident, the polar bear, as a mother bear struggles to provide for her cubs in a world of shrinking sea ice. Key species and filming locations: Emperor penguins (Atka Bay, Antarctica); Killer whales and Weddell seals (Antarctic Peninsula, Antarctica); Aerial scenic (Karakoum Mountains, Skardu, Pakistan); Pallas's cat, Mongolian gerbil, Brandt's vole (Sukhbaatar Province, Mongolia); Siberian tiger (Russian Far East, Land of the Leopard National Park); Musk deer, wild boar, Asiatic black bear (Durminskoye Forest reserve, Russia); Brown bear, Musk ox (Nunavut, Canada); Hooded seal (West Ice, Greenland); Melt lakes and moulins (Russell glacier / Greenland Ice Cap); Glacier calving (Store glacier, Greenland); Polar bears (Svalbard, Norway)
2	"Frozen Ocean"	Rachel Scott	18 September 2022	5.71
At the top of Earth lies the Arctic Ocean. After four months of winter darkness, the sun returns to reveal a frozen ocean covered in ice. Mother polar bears emerge from their hillside dens and lead their cubs down to the sea ice to hunt, while a young male and female bear forge a surprising friendship out on the ice. For others, the frozen sea is a trap. A pod of beluga whales has been confined to an ice hole for five months, slowly starving to death as the food around them runs out. Their salvation lies in the strengthening sun that comes with spring, melting the sea ice, allowing their escape. Off the east coast of Greenland, the floating pack ice in spring is a nursery ground for harp seals. Mothers and pups have just a few weeks together for the pup to learn to swim before she leaves him to fend for himself. But in today's warming climate, storms can tip helpless youngsters into the sea before they are strong enough to fend for themselves. Summer is a time of plenty in the Arctic Ocean as plankton blooms feed millions of tiny mouths, such as bizarre skeleton shrimps, as well as the biggest: bowhead whales. These ancient and long-lived whales arrive en masse every year at secret locations known as whale spas. But today, with the loss of summer sea ice, their peace is shattered by orcas from the south. These daring predators are bold enough to take on the much larger bowheads, targeting their vulnerable calves. The 24-hour daylight of the Arctic summer attracts visitors from afar, including huge flocks of seabirds like the crested auklet. A male must use both his song and a secret tangerine perfume if he is to attract a mate. For the resident walrus, the summer heat can be unbearable. After hauling himself to the beach to moult, an old male uses an ingenious technique to get himself back to the cool of the water - a roly-poly! Summers in the Arctic today bring record-breaking heat. With climate change, it is warming faster than anywhere else on Earth. It is predicted that the Arctic Ocean could become ice-free each summer by 2035, raising new challenges for polar bears. Without sea ice, more and more bears are becoming stranded on remote Arctic islands. It's a dangerous place to be for a mother bear with cubs, surrounded by larger, predatory males. Key species and filming locations: Polar bear playing (Svalbard, Norway); Beluga whale (Russia and Canada); Narwhal (Canada); Harp seal (Greenland Sea); Skeleton shrimp (Norway); Bowhead whale (Russia and Canada); Killer whale (Russia); Crested auklets (Sivuqaq, St Lawrence Island, USA); Walrus (Atlantic Walrus); Polar bear mother and cub (Wrangel Island, Russia)
3	"Frozen Peaks"	Alex Lanchester	25 September 2022	5.34
We begin our journey close to the equator - the furthest point from the poles - in East Africa. Here on the high slopes of Mount Kenya, during the day the tropical sun keeps the cold at bay, but at night the frost descends. During this cycle of freeze and thaw, a pregnant high-casqued chameleon must choose the right time to give birth if her newborns are to escape the deadly night freeze. Away from the equator in the European Alps, long cold winters give way to short, bountiful summers. For a pair of golden eagles raising their chick, the demand to provide enough food for it drives them to tackle prey five times their size. To catch a goat-like chamois, they risk it all using one of the most daring and breathtaking hunting techniques ever witnessed. The mountains of Japan are the snowiest place on Earth, providing hostile conditions for a lone male Japanese macaque cast away from his troop. His only chance of survival comes with finding another male whose embrace will provide him with life-saving warmth. But in the frozen peaks, the deadliest force is an avalanche whose full destructive power is captured for the first time using high-speed camera racer drones. The roof of the world is home to an array of unexpected cold-loving creatures. In the remote Southern Alps of New Zealand, a species of parrot - the kea - uses its famed intelligence to feed on the dead. And in the Andes in South America, puma hunt on the high altitude plains, with a young puma being allowed to eat a recent kill from an adult, while the Andean flamingo thrive in high-altitude volcanic lakes, but their chicks must race to escape the winter freeze or risk becoming trapped in the ice. Today, due to climate change, our frozen peaks are undergoing rapid change. Using groundbreaking time-lapse photography, we reveal mountain glaciers vanishing before our very eyes and discover what a warming world may mean for our most famous mountain resident of all, the giant panda. Key species and filming locations: African elephant, Zebra (Amboseli National Park, Kenya); Cattle egret, High-casqued chameleon, Desert locust (Mount Kenya National Park, Kenya); Golden eagle, Alpine chamois (Gran Paradiso National Park, Italy); Japanese macaque (Kamikochi and Joshinetsu Kogen National Park, Japan); Avalanche (Alberta, Canada); Kea (Waitangi Forest Conservation Area, New Zealand); Glacial ice flow (Franz Josef Glacier, New Zealand); Puma, Guanaco (Laguna Amarga Estancia and Torres Del Paine, Patagonia, Chile); Andean and Chilean Flamingo (Atacama desert, Chile); Aerial scenics (Karakorum Mountains, Skardu, Pakistan); Glacier Time lapse (Ferpècle Glacier, Gorner Glacier, Saint Annafirn Glacier, Morteratsch Glacier, Switzerland); Glacier time lapse (Quelccaya ice cap, Peru); Giant panda (Wolong National Nature Reserve, China)
4	"Frozen South"	Orla Doherty	2 October 2022	5.13
Our journey begins at the far edge of the continent, on its far-flung sub-Antarctic islands. Here we meet king penguins that, to feed at sea, must face the danger of ferocious leopard seals lurking in the shallows. On another island, we witness for the first time male Antipodean albatross partnering up with each other as the females in their population are disappearing due to fishing activity. Heading towards the continent of Antarctica, we traverse the roughest seas on Earth - the Southern Ocean - where we find the rarely filmed Antarctic blue whale, the largest animal to have ever lived. At the edge of Antarctica, the sea is so cold that it freezes over, creating a vital ice platform for a mother Weddell seal to raise her precious pup. Still, she needs to protect him from aggressive males. In spring, the coast of Antarctica is free of snow, drawing in thousands of breeding chinstrap penguins. Stones are at a premium to build their elevated nests and protect chicks from meltwater. But stealing is commonplace, and to make matters worse, with climate change we find chicks today shivering with hypothermia – a warming Antarctica means increased meltwater. Other residents are facing an uncertain future too, including wave-washing killer whales. We discover that their favourite prey, Weddell seals, are now harder to reach, so instead they are resorting to targeting much more feisty prey, like crabeater seals and even leopard seals, an apex predator in its own right. This dramatic encounter has never been filmed before. Travelling into the interior of the continent - into the frozen heart of Antarctica - we find great surprises. This is one of the most volcanic regions on earth, and one of the driest. We reveal unexpected sand dunes, hidden in a rare ice-free valley. Then, on the exposed mountain tops, sticking out from the otherwise ice-covered interior, we find tiny snow petrel, which raise their chicks further south than any other bird, and defend their territory by projectile vomiting! The greatest revelation lies deep in the interior, beneath the surface of an ice-covered lake, where we discover ancient alien-like structures - giant stromatolites - built by primitive lifeforms. If life can make it here, in the extremes of Antarctica, it raises the possibility that life can exist elsewhere, including in the frozen lakes of distant planets. Key species and filming locations: Scenery and King penguins (St Andrews Bay, South Georgia); King penguins & Leopard seals (Right Whale Bay, South Georgia); Antipodean wandering albatross (Antipodes Island New Zealand); Antarctic blue whale (Southern Ocean); Chinstrap penguins (Deception Island, Antarctic Peninsula); Killer whales, Adelie penguin, Crabeater seals, Leopard seals (Antarctic Peninsula); Weddell seal (Ross Sea, Antarctica); Snow petrels (Svarthamaren Mountain, Dronning Maud Land); Lake Untersee stromatolites (Gruber Mountains, Queen Maud Land)
5	"Frozen Lands"	Jane Atkins	9 October 2022	5.11
In the far north of our planet lies the largest land habitat on earth, home to snow-covered forests and the icy open tundra. These are lands of extremes that push animals to their limits: in winter they are so cold that much of the ground has remained frozen since the last ice age. To stand any chance of survival, animals must adapt in extreme ways: here a super pack of wolves, 25 strong, has come together to take on the only large prey available to them in winter, American bison. On the featureless tundra, an Arctic fox must strike a living alone. She is a wanderer and will roam many hundreds of miles searching for tiny lemmings, hidden deep underground. The only way to reach them is with a head dive. In the remote far east of Russia, a rare Amur leopard prowls the seemingly empty, snow-covered forest. With little prey available, it must use its ingenuity to find a meal. It follows crows in the hope of finding carrion, but it must not stay long, for it shares the forest with a far larger but equally hungry big cat, the Siberian tiger. As spring arrives, the forests begin to thaw and life returns. Beneath the ground, a nest of tiny painted turtle hatchlings now emerge, having remained frozen in a state of suspended animation throughout winter. To the north, it is a further month before the sun's warmth baths the frozen ground of the tundra. Tucked away underground lies a tiny snow queen – a Lapland bumblebee (Bombus lapponicus). She is the sole survivor of her colony - the rest perished in the winter freeze - but her larger size, her furry body and antifreeze in her blood have allowed her to survive. Now she is in a hurry. She must feed herself and raise a brood in the brief window of summer while the flowers are in bloom. Snowy owls also use the open tundra to breed: one pair have raised a nest full of fluffy chicks. With 24-hour daylight in which to hunt, the dedicated parents bring back meal after meal for their ever-growing brood. But one day, they return to find the nest empty… Today, the biggest challenge in the tundra is climate change. Warming summers are melting the permafrost deep within the soil, causing the ground to thaw and, in places, the land to collapse. These changes are impacting the animals too. Caribou arrive in herds of 200,000 individuals to raise their calves in the rich pastures, but warming means mosquitos emerge sooner and bother the calves before they have had a chance to gain strength. The parents drive their young to cooler, mosquito-free land, but to get there they must cross rivers running with increased meltwater and escape hungry grizzly bears. They, like much of the tundra's wildlife, are adapted to live in the extremes - but the challenge of today's warming climate could be one extreme too many. Key species and filming locations: Wolf and Bison (Wood Buffalo National Park, Canada); Lemmings and Arctic fox (Nunavut, Canada); Peel plateau permafrost slumps (Northwest Territories, Canada); Scenery and aerials (Boreal forests, Finland); Amur leopard and Siberian tiger (Land of the Leopard National Park, Russia); Lapland bumblebee (Abisko National Park, Sweden); Caribou and Grizzly bear (Arctic National Wildlife Refuge, USA); Snowy owls (Utqiagvik, Barrow, USA); Painted turtles (Northern forest, USA and Canada)
6	"Our Frozen Planet"	James Reed	16 October 2022	4.95
Our frozen planet is changing. In this final episode, we meet the scientists and people dedicating their lives to understanding what these changes mean, not just for the animals and people who live there, but for the world as a whole. Our journey begins in the Arctic, where every summer huge quantities of ice calve from the edges of Greenland's melting glaciers. On top of the ice cap itself, glaciologist Alun Hubbard descends into a moulin to try to understand the mechanisms that are driving this historic loss of ice. Elsewhere in the Arctic, it's not just land ice that is disappearing. In the Gulf of St Lawrence, Canada, biologists are trying to find out how the loss of sea ice will impact the lives of baby harps. In Arctic Russia, with the loss of summer sea ice, more and more polar bears are arriving on the island of Wrangel. Here, a local ranger and scientists are braving the hungry bears to assess their future survival. Loss of sea ice impacts not just wildlife but people too. In the remote community of Qaanaaq, Greenland, local Inuit hunters are finding the ice too dangerous to travel and hunt on, risking their traditional way of life. And these changes happening in the Arctic have the potential to affect people far beyond. On Alaska's open tundra, bubbling lakes hint at the gases being released from the previously frozen soil, including the potent greenhouse gas methane. There is one place where the full scale of a melting Arctic can be best witnessed - from space. Based in the International Space Station, astronaut Jessica Meir looks down at forest fires across Europe and reflects how our changing weather patterns are interconnected. Rapid ice loss is also happening across the high mountains of the planet's continents. Glaciologist Hamish Pritchard uses a sophisticated helicopter-strung radar system to try to quantify how much ice is left in the previously uncharted glaciers of the Himalayas. It's important as, downstream, some 1.2 billion people rely on glacial meltwater as their primary source of fresh water. Finally, in Antarctica, we meet Bill Fraser, who has dedicated 45 years of his life to studying the Adelie penguin. Over this period, he has witnessed changes in weather conditions and the extinction of entire colonies. These 'canaries in the coal mine' are a sign that all is not well, even in the remotest place on earth. And changes here have the potential to affect all of us, so an international group of scientists is on an urgent mission to assess the stability of a huge body of ice known as the Thwaites ice shelf. If this plug of ice melts and slips into the ocean, it will raise global sea levels, impacting coastal communities across the planet. The unprecedented changes our scientists are witnessing may be profound, but there is hope that, through a combination of technology and willpower, there is still time to save what remains of our frozen planet. Key species and filming locations: Glaciers calving (Store glacier, Greenland); Harp seal science (Gulf of St Lawrence, Canada); Polar bear science (Wrangel Island, Russia); Methane seeping from Lakes (Fairbanks surrounds, Alaska, USA); Glacier survey (Ngozumpa glacier, Nepal); Penguin science (Torgeson and Livingston Islands, Antarctica); Thwaites Glacier Research Project (Thwaites ice shelf, Antarctica); International Space Station (kindly filmed with thanks to NASA)

"Recently at COP26, 120 nations came together in an effort to limit global warming to 1.5 degrees. Well, a 1.5 degree rise will still bring significant changes with it. To stand any chance of saving what remains of our frozen planet and saving ourselves from the devastating consequences of its loss, we must stick to this commitment and honour it no matter how challenging it might be... We can do it. It's within our power to do it. We can do it. We must do it. Then there will be a future for the planet."

— David Attenborough, in closing

== Reception ==
=== Critical reception ===
Reviewers at The Guardian, The Daily Telegraph and The Times all awarded the opening episode a maximum five stars, with Lucy Mangan of the former stating "You cannot stay unengaged, you cannot remain unmoved by the sight of nature in all her glory". The opening episode was also given five stars by Rachel Sigee at the I stating "Ending exactly as it should – with a call to arms – its scale and finesse must not be taken for granted, and its message must be heard". In contrast Nick Hilton at her sister paper The Independent awarded the opening episode just 3 stars opining that "this feels more like a greatest hits compilation than a documentary that has something new, and pressing, to say".

== Merchandise ==
=== Books ===
Frozen Planet II accompanies the TV series and was released in hardcover format on 11 September 2022 to coincide with the series debut in the UK. It is written by the series producers Mark Brownlow and Elizabeth White. The UK version is published by BBC Books.

A 64-page children's book to accompany the series, also called Frozen Planet II, will be released in hardcover format on 6 October 2022. Written by Leisa Stewart-Sharpe, it is illustrated by Kim Smith, with a foreword by Chris Packham. The UK version is published by BBC Books.

=== Open University poster ===
A Frozen Planet II poster was produced in collaboration with and distributed for free by The Open University.

== Music ==
=== Take Me Back Home ===
On 22 August 2022, the BBC announced that the Cuban-born American singer and songwriter Camila Cabello had collaborated with composer Hans Zimmer to write and record a new song entitled Take Me Back Home. The accompanying press release highlighted that it marked the first time a completely new song had been written to support a BBC One natural history landmark release (previously Radiohead had rerecorded "Bloom" for Blue Planet II and Sia being credited as co-writer for the original song "Out there" which was used on the series Seven Worlds, One Planet).

In a press release, Camila Cabello said: "...Frozen Planet II is stunning and Sir David's narration is deeply powerful as we try to protect these incredible ecosystems from global warming. I'm grateful to be able to lend my voice to such an inspiring series."

The song was used as the soundtrack for a Frozen Planet II extended trailer released by the BBC to promote the series and saw its debut on 26 August 2022.

=== Soundtrack ===
Frozen Planet II

Soundtrack album by Hans Zimmer, Adam Lukas, James Everingham
- Released: 7 October 2022 (Digital); 21 October 2022 (Audio CD)
- Genres: Soundtrack, Classical music
- Label: Silva Screen Records
- Producers: BBC Worldwide; BBC Earth

The musical score and songs featured in the series are composed by Hans Zimmer, Adam Lukas and James Everingham for Bleeding Fingers Music. Additionally Anže Rozman (score arranger) is credited alongside Zimmer for the opening titles. Russell Emanuel serves as score producer alongside Greg Rappaport and Marsha Bowe as score supervisors. Hans Zimmer returned to score the series having previously worked with the BBC Natural History Unit on both Seven Worlds, One Planet and Blue Planet II. On 27 August 2022, as part of the pre-launch publicity, it was revealed that vocals by Norwegian singer-songwriter Aurora would feature as part of the incidental music used during the series.

Track Listing
Disc 1			Disc 2		
No.	Title	Length	No.	Title	Length
1.	The Frozen Planet (feat. Aurora)	4:23	1.	Kingdoms of Ice (feat. Aurora)	3:26
2.	Harp Seal Pup (feat. Aurora)	5:13	2.	Journey to the Southern Ocean	5:16
3.	Silent Sky (feat. Aurora)	3:11	3.	Daylight Robbery	1:52
4.	Origins of Life (feat. Aurora)	2:37	4.	Amur Tiger	6:18
5.	Boreal Forest (feat. Aurora)	1:37	5.	Full Flight Capacity	4:41
6.	Arrival of Spring (feat. Aurora)	3:02	6.	Tundra Awakening (feat. Aurora)	2:48
7.	Beluga Escape (feat. Aurora)	3:02	7.	Hunting Grounds	4:04
8.	Fidgety Bedfellow	1:49	8.	Many Winters	4:16
9.	Giants of the Deep (feat. Aurora)	1:31	9.	Frozen Peaks (feat. Aurora)	1:44
10.	Orca Ramming	2:42	10.	Atacama Winds (feat. Aurora)	5:24
11.	Showdown at the Shore (feat. Aurora)	4:46	11.	Learning to Breathe (feat. Aurora)	3:13
12.	Aurora Borealis I (feat. Aurora)	2:09	12.	The Matriarch	3:23
13.	Aurora Borealis II	1:03	13.	Hide and Seek	3:49
14.	Full Bloom (feat. Aurora)	2:09	14.	Wandering Albatross	2:45
15.	Projectile Vomit	2:01	15.	Companionship (feat. Aurora)	1:51
16.	Losing Ice (feat. Aurora)	2:26	16.	Scars of the Earth (feat. Aurora)	2:26
17.	Wrangel Island (feat. Aurora)	4:23	17.	Then There Will Be a Future	3:41
18.	Crisis (feat. Aurora)	4:00	-	-	-
Total length		52:04	Total length		1:00:57
