= A A Dhand =

British crime-writer

- Education: Fulneck School, West Yorkshire
- Occupation: Author
- Writing career
- Genre: Crime fiction
- Notable work: Harry Virdee series

A A Dhand (Amit Dhand) is a British crime-writer. His recent books are set in the West Yorkshire city of Bradford, a former industrial city very much a shadow of its former self and rife with social deprivation, crime and complex inter-communal challenges.

== Early life and education ==
Born in April 1979 and raised in Bradford from age two, the son of an immigrant corner shop owner, Dhand was educated at Fulneck School, a boarding and day private school in the market town of Pudsey (near Leeds) in West Yorkshire. The School features in his novels. He graduated in 2002 with a Master of Pharmacy (MPharm) from the University of Bradford.

== Life and career ==
Dhand worked as a pharmacist in London before returning to his hometown to start a pharmacy business and write books.

He is now a regular contributor to a number of British Asian and crime writers' forums.

=== Writing ===
Dhand's first novel featured a character Ranjit Singh and is set against the Partition of India and Pakistan in 1947; but it has been his more recent novels that have won him critical acclaim. These have featured the Bradford-based police detective Harry Virdee, a progressive British Sikh who struggles with his cultural identity and family loyalties. Race, violence and exploitation are on the agenda in the Virdee novels, and Dhand has not shied away from controversial issues of tension between British Asian communities. Dhand is fairly unique as he sets his protagonists (who are shaped by Asian culture) in a British setting.

His novel Streets of Darkness was developed as a TV drama. In August 2023, the BBC announced that the Harry Virdee books would be adapted into a six episode series entitled Virdee, with Staz Nair starring in the title role. The series was released in February 2025, following a Red Carpet event in Bradford, attended by Dhand, Nair, Aysha Kala (who plays Virdee's wife, Saima), Vikash Bhai (who plays Virdee’s drug kingpin brother-in-law) and Danyal Ismeal (who plays Virdee's novice colleague).

In April 2024, it was announced that Dhand had moved from Transworld to HarperCollins' imprint HQ, as part of a two-book deal. The books will be about a new character, Idris Kalia, a Leeds pharmacist involved in a turf war. In early 2026, HarperCollins released details of the second book in the series, to be called The Kingpin.

== Bibliography ==
	Hardback			Paperback				
Title	Publisher	Date	ISBN	Publisher	Date	ISBN (p/b)	Series	Notes
Fields of Blood	—N/a						Ranjit Singh	Written in 2012-13. Although a winning entry in a crime-writing competition, there is no indication that this was ever published.
Streets of Darkness	Bantam Press	16 June 2016	ISBN 9780593076644	Corgi Books	23 February 2017	ISBN 9780552172783	D.I. Harry Virdee	
Girl Zero	Bantam Press	13 July 2017	ISBN 9780593076668	Corgi Books	22 February 2918	ISBN 9780552172790	D.I. Harry Virdee	
City of Sinners	Bantam Press	28 June 2018	ISBN 978-0593080498	Corgi Books	21 March 2019	ISBN 9780552175555	D.I. Harry Virdee	Republished on 6 February 2025 with the title Virdee as a tie-in to the television series with a photograph of Staz Nair as DCI Harry Virdee on the cover
One Way Out	Bantam Press	27 June 2019	ISBN 9781787631755	Corgi Books	19 March 2020	ISBN 9780552176538	D.I. Harry Virdee	
Darkness Rising	—N/a			Corgi Books	20 February 2020	ISBN 9780552177092	D.I. Harry Virdee	This is a Quick Reads Initiative book
Blood Divide	Bantam Press	24 June 2021	ISBN 9781787631762)	Penguin Books	14 May 2022	ISBN 9780552176545	Jack Baxi	
The Chemist	HQ Books	22 May 2025	ISBN 9780008645854	HQ Books	29 January 2026	ISBN 9780008645816	Idris Kalia	
The Kingpin	HQ Books	2 July 2026	ISBN 9780008645908	HQ Books	14 January 2027	ISBN 9780008645878	Idris Kalia<	
