= Grotrian-Steinweg =

Company

Grotrian, Helfferich, Schulz, Th. Steinweg Nachf. GmbH & Co
- Type: Private
- Industry: Musical instruments
- Founded: 1835
- Founder: Heinrich Engelhard Steinweg, C.F. Theodor Steinweg, Georg Friedrich Karl Grotrian
- Defunct: 2025
- Headquarters: Braunschweig, Germany
- Area served: Worldwide
- Products: Pianos
- Website: www.grotrian.de

Grotrian-Steinweg, known as Grotrian in the US, was a German manufacturer of prestige pianos. The company is based in Braunschweig, Germany, commonly known as Brunswick in English. Grotrian-Steinweg made premium grand pianos and upright pianos.

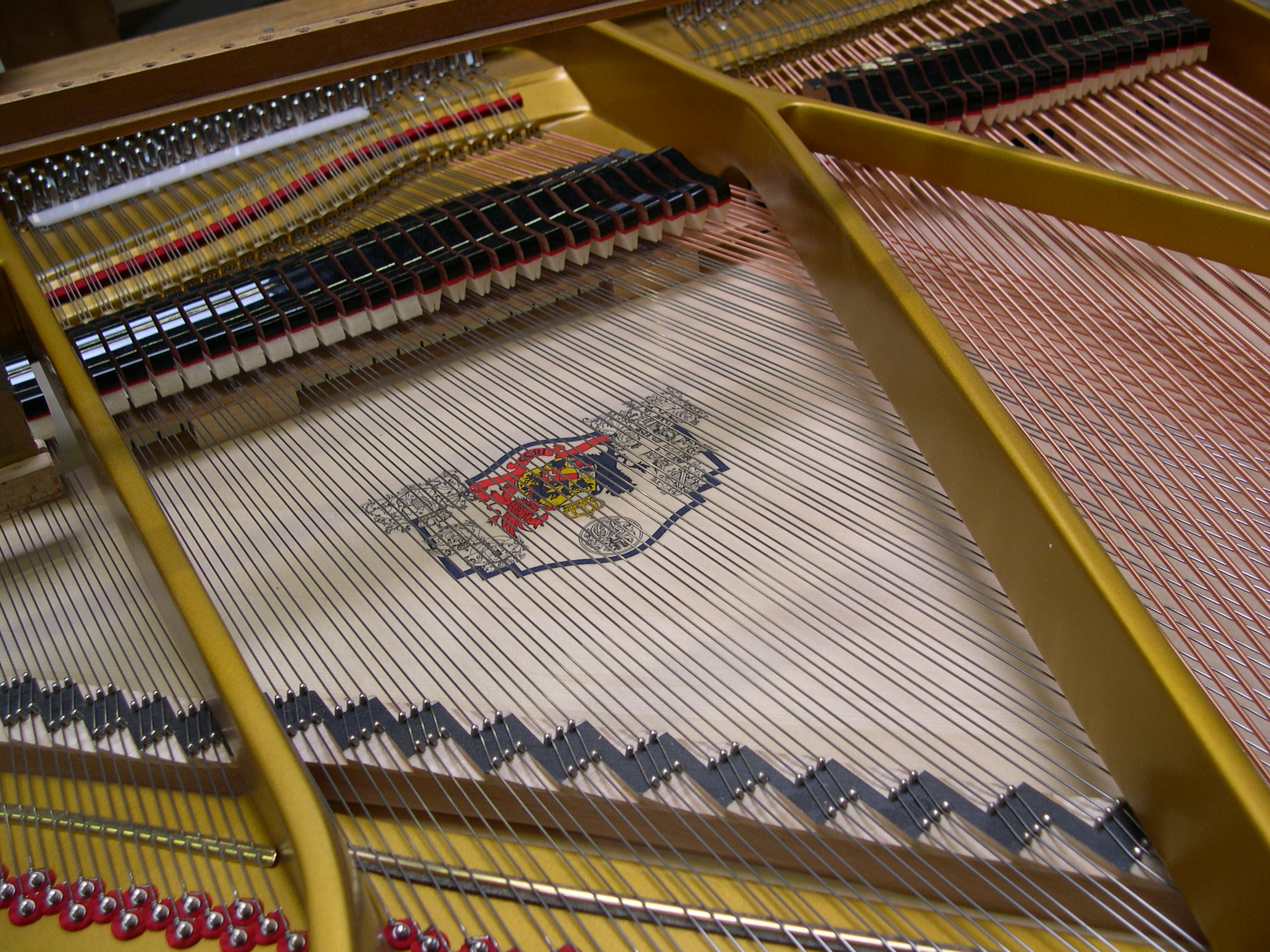
Grotrian-Steinweg grand piano inner mechanism

Grotrian-Steinweg's history dates back to 1835 when the first Steinweg piano factory was built by Heinrich Engelhard Steinweg (later known as Henry Steinway after his emigration to the US where he founded Steinway & Sons). In 1856, Friedrich Grotrian became a partner; in 1865 his son Wilhelm Grotrian and two associates bought the factory and the right to market their pianos as successors to the Steinweg brand. Ensuing generations of Grotrian family members led the company to become one of the finest piano manufacturers in Germany. Grotrian-Steinweg pianos were preferred by some famous pianists, and they received accolades at the World's Columbian Exposition in Chicago. Grotrian-Steinweg operated an orchestra and a concert hall, and established sales rooms in a half dozen major cities in Germany, and by 1920, in London as well. At its peak in the late 1920s, Grotrian-Steinweg employed 1,000 people and made 3,000 pianos per year.

Economic depression in the 1930s and war in the 1940s caused Grotrian-Steinweg to decline severely and then lose its factory completely. The family rebuilt the factory and re-established its reputation for quality work. In the 1950s, an annual piano-playing competition was founded by the company, to identify promising young piano students.

Grotrian-Steinweg sought to expand into the US in the mid-1960s. Steinway & Sons sued to prevent them from using the Steinweg name, resulting in a 1975 decision by the United States Court of Appeals for the Second Circuit. The case set a precedent in describing "initial interest confusion": that the brand Grotrian-Steinweg could cause piano buyers to temporarily confuse its brand with the brand Steinway & Sons. The court ordered Grotrian-Steinweg to stop selling pianos in the US under the "Steinweg" name. Afterward, the company formed a business entity named Grotrian Piano Company to sell pianos in North America.

== 19th century ==
On 13 January 1803, Georg Friedrich Karl Grotrian, called Friedrich, was born in Schöningen, Germany. He settled in Moscow to sell pianos, beginning around 1830. He joined a partnership in a small piano making firm based in Saint Petersburg, and included these pianos among the various instruments he sold in his successful Moscow music shop.

In Germany, Heinrich Engelhard Steinweg (1797–1871) started making pianos in 1835 from his house in Seesen at the edge of the Harz mountains; a source of fine beech and spruce wood for the instruments. Among the pianos that Steinweg produced in his first year was a square piano designed by and built for Friedrick Grotrian. (This instrument is now in the Braunschweig museum.) H.E. Steinweg entered three of his pianos in a state fair in 1839, two of them square pianos, but his grand piano brought wide notice. In 1850, H.E. Steinweg took most of his large family to New York City, leaving the piano factory to his eldest son C.F. Theodor Steinweg (1825–1889) who stayed behind to run it under his own name. Meanwhile, in New York City, the Steinweg family Americanized their surname to Steinway and in 1853 they founded the piano manufacturer Steinway & Sons.

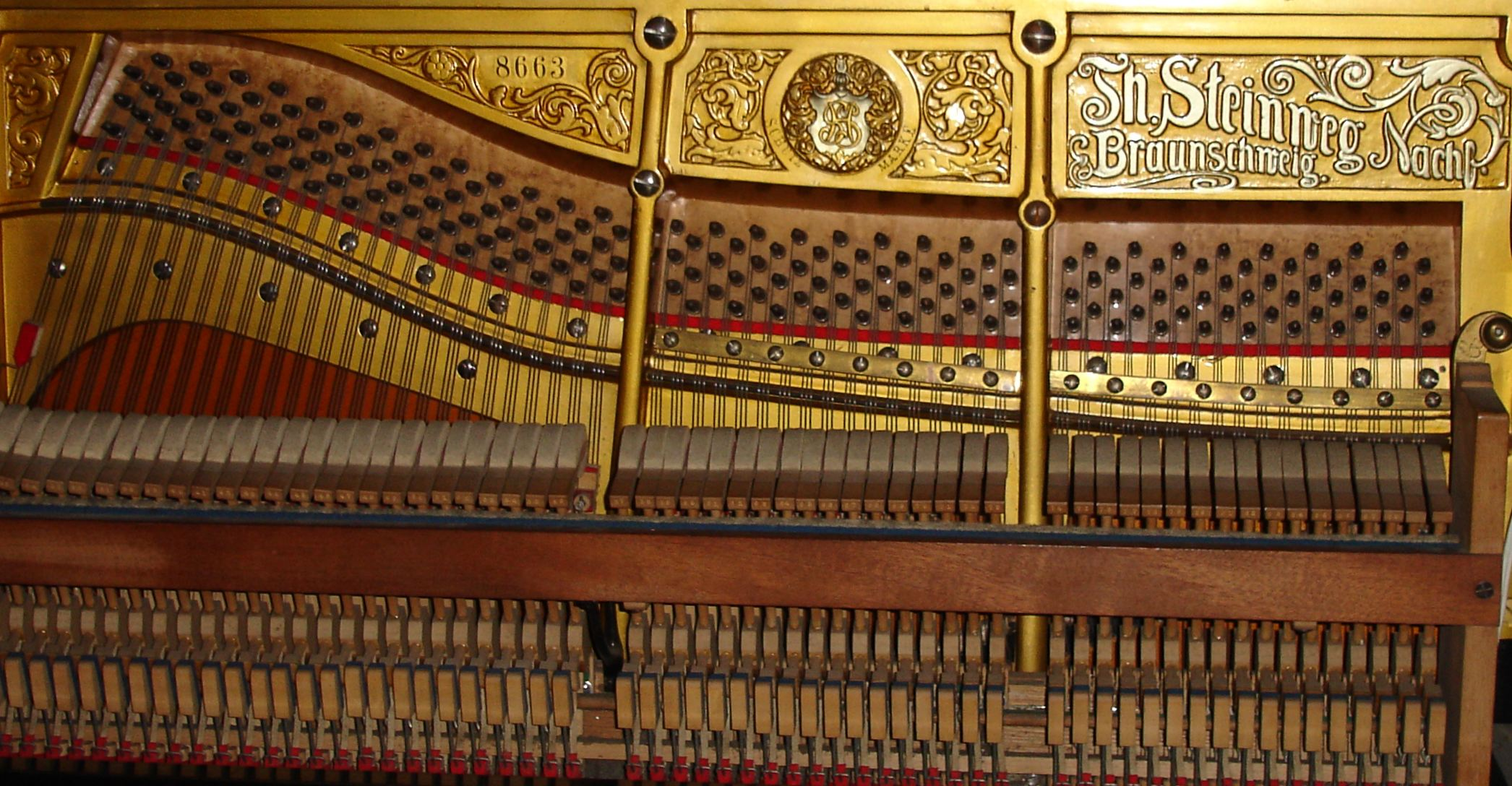
An early piano branded "Th. Steinweg Nachf.", meaning "successor to Theodor Steinweg"

Soon after taking ownership of his father's old factory, C.F. Theodor Steinweg moved it to Wolfenbüttel near Braunschweig. Here he met Friedrich Grotrian who was traveling for business. In 1854, Friedrich Grotrian received the Müller-Mühlenbein pharmacy as an inheritance from an uncle, so he moved back to Germany to manage it. He joined C.F. Theodor Steinweg's piano company as a partner in 1856.

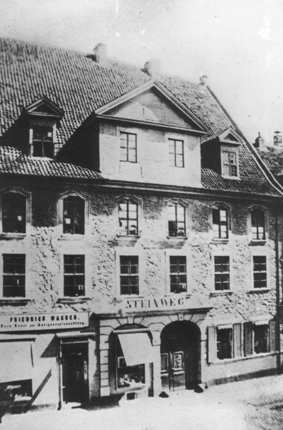
The Grotrian-Steinweg residence and piano-making workshop in Braunschweig

In 1857, C.F. Theodor Steinweg and Grotrian moved the piano factory to Braunschweig, setting up shop in a former mayor's mansion at 48 Bohlweg Street in the inner, medieval part of the city. The company employed about 25 people at this time. Friedrich Grotrian died on 11 December 1860, leaving his share of the company to his son Wilhelm (1843–1917). In 1865, C.F. Theodor Steinweg was needed by his family in New York to help manage Steinway & Sons after his brothers Henry and Charles died. Wilhelm Grotrian joined with two of the piano workmen—Adolph Helfferich and H.D.W. Schulz—to buy out C.F. Theodor Steinweg's share of the building. The new partnership paid for the right to use the trademark "C.F. Th. Steinweg Nachf.", meaning, "Successor to C.F. Theodor Steinweg." (Nachf. is an abbreviation for Nachfolger—German for successor.) The company name became "Grotrian, Helfferich, Schulz, Th. Steinweg Nachf." Wilhelm Grotrian raised two sons in the 1870s: Wilhelm "Willi" Grotrian Jr (1868–1931) and Kurt Grotrian (1870–1929).

In New York City, C.F. Theodor Steinweg (H.E. Steinweg's son) changed his name to C.F. Theodore Steinway, and served as the leader and chief technician of Steinway & Sons for fifteen years. He did not like living in the US, so he kept his home in Braunschweig and traveled back and forth as needed. In 1880 he stopped traveling overseas and started a new Steinway & Sons piano factory in Hamburg, competing with his father's old firm, now called Grotrian-Steinweg, in making pianos for European customers. After establishing the business, Steinway retired to Braunschweig for his last years. He died in 1889, leaving his collection of pianos to the city's museum. The Hamburg factory proved successful in competing against Grotrian-Steinweg—both companies were known for producing premium pianos.

In the 1880s, Willi Grotrian studied piano making with Wm. Knabe & Co. in Baltimore, Maryland, and with Pleyel, Wolff et Cie in Paris, France. Kurt Grotrian also studied with piano makers in other countries. Their father Wilhelm Grotrian Sr took Willi with him to Chicago in 1893; there, at the World's Columbian Exposition, Grotrian-Steinweg won an award for fine quality. Pianists Eugen d'Albert, Ignacy Jan Paderewski and Clara Schumann expressed a preference for Grotrian-Steinweg pianos. Grotrian-Steinweg was counted among the top German piano manufacturers along with Bechstein, Blüthner, Feurich, Ibach, Lipp and the Hamburg division of Steinway. In 1895, Wilhelm Grotrian Sr made his two sons partners in the business. He told them, "Lads, build good pianos and the rest will take care of itself." Willi Grotrian methodically set about to improve the systems and standards the Grotrian-Steinweg company used to produce pianos. The Grotrian-Steinweg brand was well known for being of the highest quality: the company was named purveyor to some 30 "Kaisers, Kings and royal houses". The owners Franz Wilhelm Grotrian, Willi Grotrian and Kurt Grotrian were awarded an imperial and royal warrant of appointment to the court of Austria-Hungary.

== 20th century ==
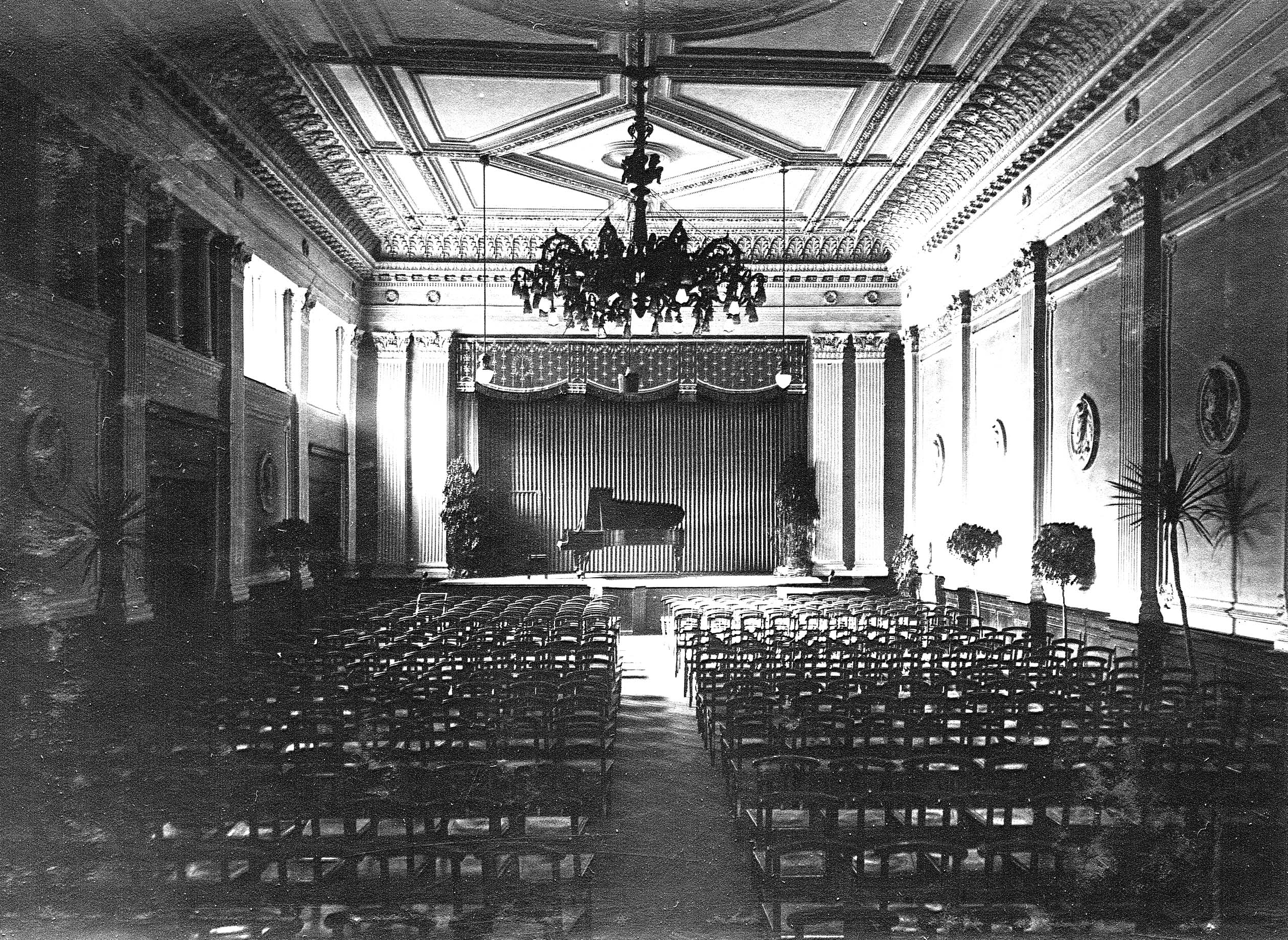
The Grotrian-Steinweg Concert Hall in Braunschweig

In Braunschweig, Grotrian-Steinweg grew to a workforce of 550 by 1913, producing about 1,600 pianos annually. The Grotrian-Steinweg Orchestra was active in Leipzig under the baton of young conductor Hermann Scherchen. Grotrian-dedicated salesrooms were operating in Leipzig, Hanover, Königsberg, Düsseldorf and Berlin.

During World War I, Kurt Grotrian left the factory to serve in the German Army. He was soon wounded and taken prisoner of war. The elder Wilhelm Grotrian died in 1917. Willi Grotrian, his son, led the company but it was greatly reduced in manpower and orders for pianos. After the war, the company resumed as before, expanding sales in 1920 by establishing a London shop under the brand name Grotrian-Steinweg. The workforce increased to 1,000. In 1924, Grotrian-Steinweg built an unusual piano for microtonal music composer Ivan Wyschnegradsky. The piano had three manuals, and strings tuned a quarter tone apart. By 1927, Grotrian-Steinweg was making about 3,000 pianos annually. This number dropped significantly in the 1930s during the Great Depression; fewer than 500 pianos were made in 1931, and the workforce was reduced to less than 200.

Kurt Grotrian had become seriously ill in the late 1920s, and in 1928 he made his two sons Erwin (1899–1990) and Helmut (1900–1977) shareholders. In 1929, Kurt Grotrian died of complications from his old war wound. Willi Grotrian died in 1931.

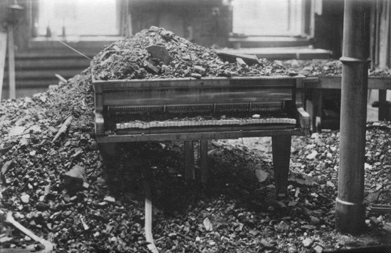
A Grotrian-Steinweg piano amid bombing destruction in 1945

In World War II, the Grotrian-Steinweg factory (like many others in Germany) was ordered to switch to fabricating parts for aircraft. The factory was destroyed in 1944 by the bombing of Braunschweig, as was the founder's mansion in the center of town. Afterward, Erwin and Helmut rebuilt the factory. By 1948, production had resumed; composer and pianist Wilhelm Kempff went on record as an admirer of the "sonority and exquisite execution" of the post-war work.

=== Piano performance competition ===
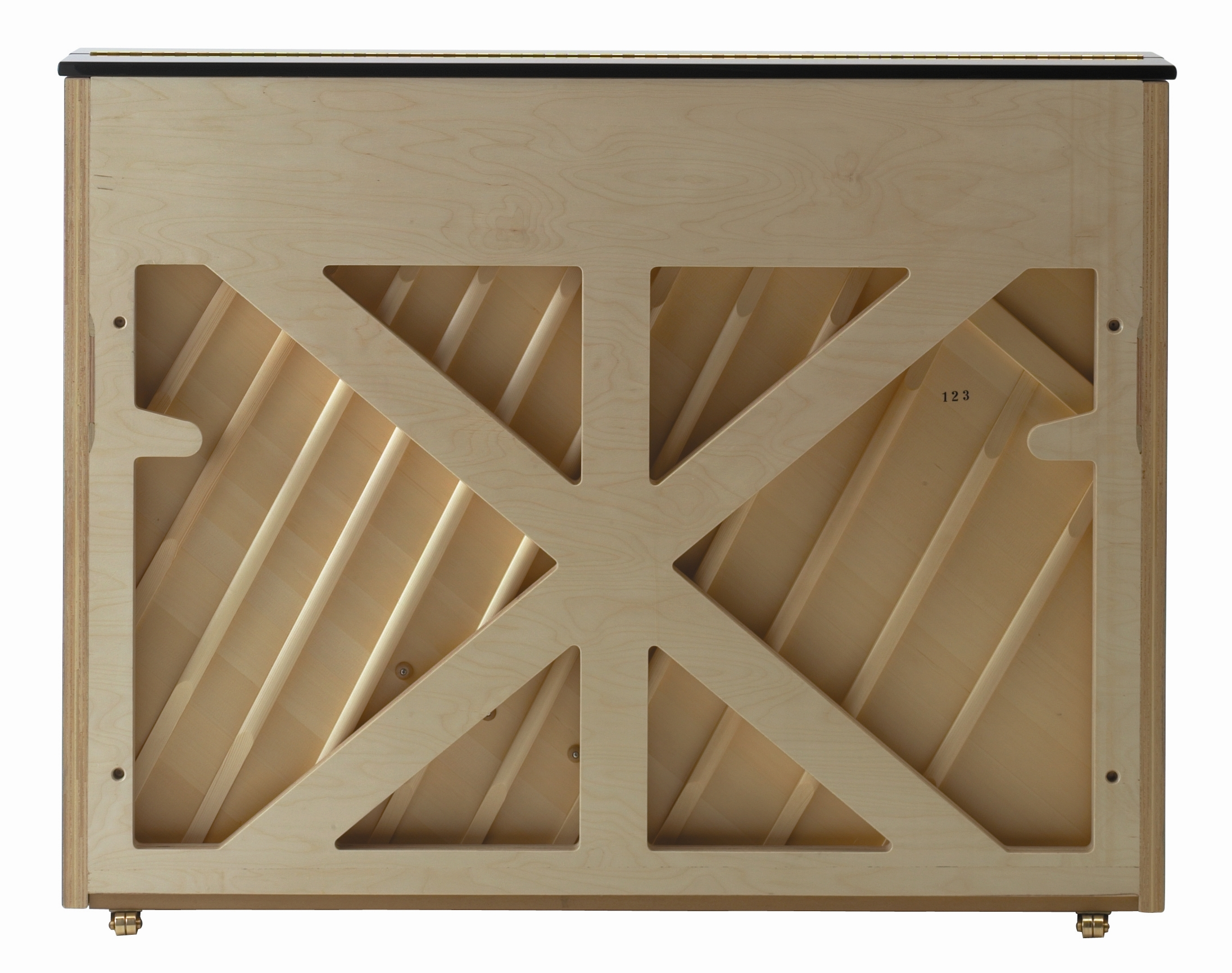
A Grotrian-Steinweg upright piano with its signature radial rear brace adding strength

In 1954, Grotrian-Steinweg initiated a piano-playing competition known as Grotrian-Steinweg Klavierspielwettbewerb, featuring young pianists from music schools. The competition took place in the Braunschweig location of the Hertie department store, with audience applause used as the gauge to determine the winner. In 1968, Grotrian-Steinweg entered into talks with the German National Music Council and the Hannover University of Music to increase the scale of the competition. It increased in odd years to encompass a national and international scope. Pianists such as Ragna Schirmer and Lars Vogt gained notice as winners of the competition.

=== Trademark conflict ===
The first trademark friction between the two piano manufacturers occurred in 1895 when Steinway & Sons sued to stop Grotrian-Steinweg from using the name "Steinweg" on its pianos. Steinway lost the case, but in January 1919, Willi and Kurt Grotrian decided to change the family surname to Grotrian-Steinweg to protect the trademark of the family business, in the hope of preventing further lawsuits. In 1925, the company established a sales presence in the US as a Delaware corporation called Grotrian-Steinweg Company. Over the next three years, Grotrian-Steinweg sold only 15 pianos in the US, in addition to a few sold by an independent dealer in New York City. Upon discovering the sales in 1928, Steinway & Sons complained to the distributor and to Grotrian-Steinweg, but in 1929 Grotrian-Steinweg sent 47 pianos to the US. A family representative of Steinway went to Germany to discuss the problem directly with the Grotrian-Steinweg family. Arriving at a private agreement, the two family leaders smoked a "peace cigar" and Grotrian-Steinweg subsequently stopped using the names "Steinweg" and "Grotrian-Steinweg" in the US. In 1930 the Delaware corporation was dissolved, and in the next three years exports from Grotrian-Steinweg to the US decreased then halted completely. In 1950, Grotrian-Steinweg relinquished its old 1926 trademark application, which had never been published.

In 1961, Knut Grotrian-Steinweg (b. 1935) joined the company. In 1966, the company formed a contract with Wurlitzer to sell Grotrian-Steinweg pianos in the US, and the Steinway company brought suit in New York. The case lasted nine years, winding its way through trial courts and district courts, presenting the litigants' counterclaims and appeals. In 1975, the United States Court of Appeals for the Second Circuit heard the arguments in Grotrian, Helfferich, Schulz, Th. Steinweg Nachf. v. Steinway & Sons. Grotrian-Steinweg, the plaintiff, argued that their brand was long established, predating Steinway's in Germany. Steinway & Sons, defendant, counterclaimed that their brand, well known and strongly positive in the US, was weakened by consumers' confusion as to whether the pianos were related. The court affirmed the lower court's ruling in favor of the defendant that piano buyers would be misled in their "initial interest" in the two piano brands; "a potential Steinway buyer may satisfy himself that the less expensive Grotrian-Steinweg is at least as good, if not better, than a Steinway." The court felt that Grotrian-Steinweg—a brand not very well known in the US—was unfairly given an extra measure of credibility based on the strong reputation that Steinway & Sons had built. Even though premium piano buyers were understood to be sophisticated and knowledgeable, and would not be confused at the time of purchase about which manufacturer produced which piano, the court held that a "subliminal confusion" might be present at the initial attraction to the Grotrian-Steinweg brand. The company was forbidden to sell pianos in the US under the name "Steinweg" after 1977. Accordingly, in 1976 Grotrian-Steinweg formed a subsidiary brand for selling pianos in North America: Grotrian Piano Company GmbH.

The case was the first instance of a court defining the concept now known as "initial interest confusion". District Judge Lloyd Francis MacMahon wrote: "Misled into an initial interest, a potential Steinway buyer may satisfy himself that the less expensive Grotrian-Steinweg is at least as good, if not better, than a Steinway." MacMahon's idea about the "initial interest" confusion was confirmed by Appeals Court Judge William H. Timbers, writing, "such initial confusion works an injury to Steinway."

The English-language section of Grotrian's website does not have any reference to the surname "Steinweg", unlike the French-, German- and Russian-language versions. This is likely a result of the lawsuit and a wish to minimize liability.

== Current operations ==
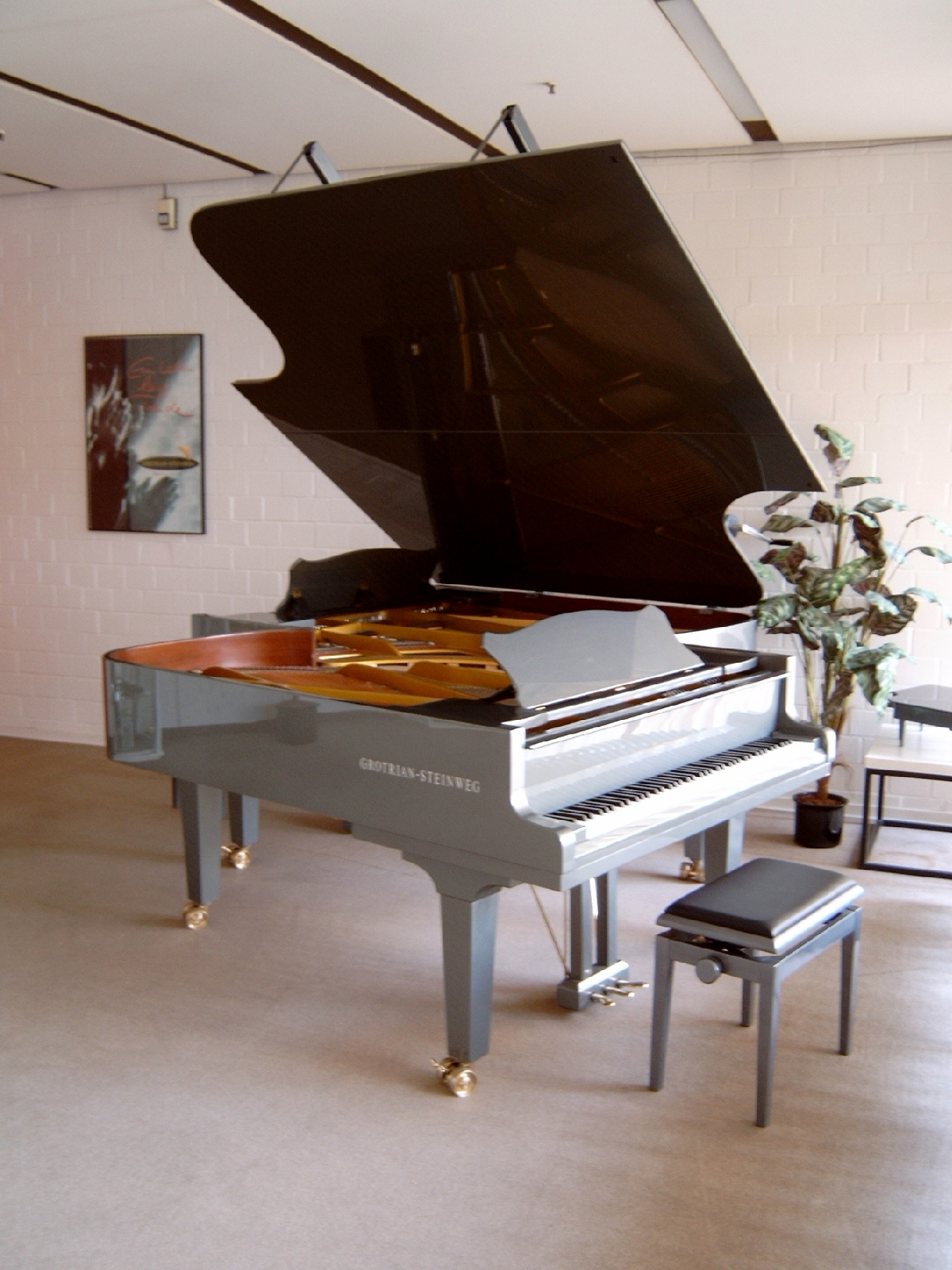
A double instrument made for performing piano duos

In 1974, the Grotrian-Steinweg family built a new factory in northwest Braunschweig on Grotrian-Steinweg Street, very near Bundesautobahn 2, a major east–west highway. After Helmut and Erwin Grotrian-Steinweg supervised the construction they retired, leaving Helmut's son Knut in charge. This factory is the current location of Grotrian-Steinweg production. In 1999, Knut Grotrian-Steinweg stepped down from active supervision of the company, and put day-to-day control in the hands of Burkhard Stein, an industrial manager and piano builder. As of 2012, the Grotrian-Steinweg company was owned by the daughters of Erwin Grotrian, with sixth-generation Jobst Grotrian (b. 1969), Knut's son, a shareholder. In 2015, a majority interest in Grotrian-Steinweg was purchased by Parsons Music Group, a company based in Hong Kong. The Grotrian family will remain represented in the group of shareholders.

Annually, the company produces about 500 upright pianos in six sizes and 100 grand pianos in five sizes. Some 20 concert grands are made per year—each one requiring 8 months of manufacture. In 2010, the company issued a special 175-year anniversary model, a 46.5-inch (118 cm) upright called Composé Exclusif, of which 50 were produced.

In 2011, Larry Fine opined that modern Grotrian-Steinweg pianos are among the "highest quality"—on par with Bösendorfer, Hamburg-built Steinway and Fazioli, and of a higher quality than New York-built Steinway.

In 2017, Grotrian-Steinweg launched the Wilhelm Grotrian brand. Made for the entry-level piano market, these pianos are designed by Grotrian-Steinweg and built by Parsons Music Group in China.

In January 2025, Parsons Music Group closed the Grotrian-Steinweg piano factory after the company filed for insolvency at the end of August 2024.

== Current grand piano models ==
Model	Length	Weight
G-277	277 cm	550 kg
G-225	225 cm	400 kg
G-208	208 cm	350 kg
G-192	192 cm	320 kg
G-165	165 cm	290 kg

== Current upright piano models ==
Model	Height	Weight
G-132	132 cm	295 kg
G-124	124 cm	255 kg
G-118	118 cm	220 kg
G-114	114 cm	215 kg
G-113	113 cm	220 kg

== Brands ==
=== Wilhelm Grotrian ===
In addition to the Grotrian-Steinweg brand, Grotrian-Steinweg sells the Wilhelm Grotrian brand. Made for the entry-level piano market, Wilhelm Grotrian pianos are designed by Grotrian-Steinweg and built by Parsons Music Group in Yichang, China.
