= Parsons Music Group =

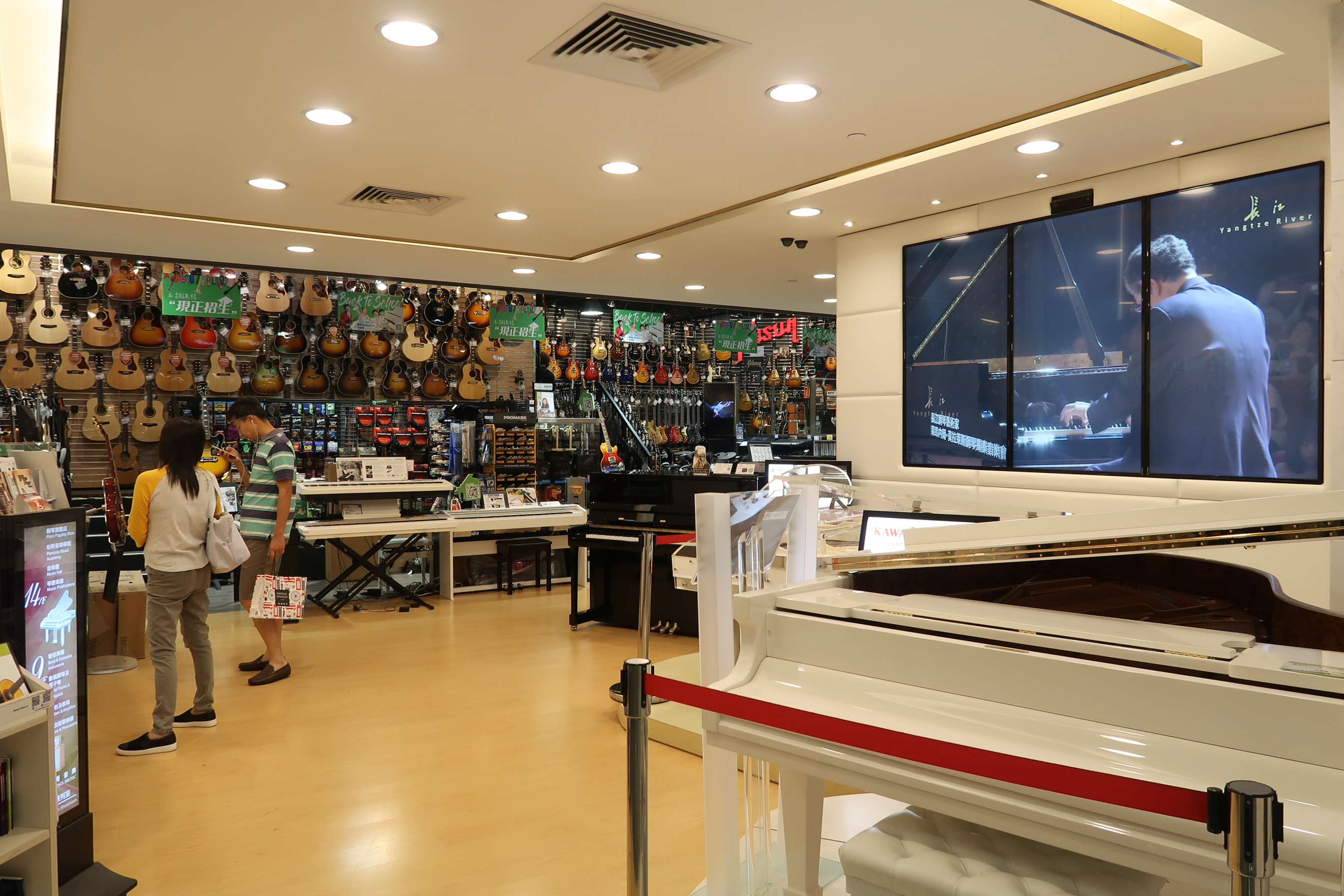
Parsons Music in Times Square

Parsons Music Group (Chinese: 柏斯音樂集團, also known as Parsons Music Corporation) is a musical instruments manufacturer and retailer based in Hong Kong, China.

== Company profile ==
Parsons was founded in 1986 by Terence and Arling Ng and became China's largest music retailer with more than 100 retail locations and 80 music schools all around the country. In its retail locations, Parsons sells acoustic and digital musical instruments including guitars, pianos, amplifiers, electronic keyboards, as well as sheet music and books.

== Pianos ==
Parsons manufactures pianos for its own brands (Yangtze River and Schönbrunn), grand pianos for Baldwin and manufactures a few Kawai models for sale only in Parsons Music's stores in China.

Parsons has been the majority shareholder of the German piano manufacturers Wilh. Steinberg since 2013 and Grotrian-Steinweg since 2015. After Parsons took full ownership in 2025 the Grotrian-Steinweg factory has closed.
