= Virdee =

British Television series

- Opening title card
- Genre: Crime thriller
- Based on: City of Sinners by A A Dhand
- Screenplay by: A A Dhand
- Starring: Staz Nair; Aysha Kala; Nina Singh; Vikash Bhai; Kulvinder Ghir; Sudha Bhuchar; Danyal Ismail
- Theme music composer: Hans Zimmer; James Everingham
- Composer: James Everingham
- Country of origin: United Kingdom
- Original language: English
- No. of series: 1
- No. of episodes: 6

Production
- Executive producers: Paul Trijbits; A A Dhand
- Producers: Stella Nwimo; Himesh Kar
- Production company: Magical Society

Original release
- Network: BBC One
- Release: 10 February – 17 March 2025

Virdee is a six-part British crime thriller television series that is adapted by A A Dhand from his Bradford-set crime novel series. It stars Staz Nair and was produced by Magical Society for BBC One. The series premiered on 10 February 2025. It was cancelled after one series.

== Synopsis ==
Harry Virdee is a detective hunting down a killer targeting the Asian community in Bradford. Meanwhile, his Sikh family are dismayed at his decision to marry Saima, who is Muslim.

== Cast and characters ==
- Staz Nair as DCI Harry Virdee
- Aysha Kala as Saima Hyatt-Virdee
- Nina Singh as Tara Virdee
- Manjinder Virk as Mandip Virdee
- Vikash Bhai as Riaz Hyatt
- Kulvinder Ghir as Ranjit Virdee
- Sudha Buchar as Jyoti Virdee
- Elizabeth Berrington as DSup Clare Conway
- Danyal Ismail as DS Amin
- Tomi May as Enzo Tobin
- Andi Jashy as Vasil Shala
- Ramon Tikaram as Jai Pawa
- Nichola Burley as Sophie Brodenham
- Tobias Jowett as Young Harry Virdee
- Jack Archer as Alastair Boardman
- Silas Carson as Jonathan Boardman
- Hussina Raja as Nadia Ansari
- Connor Horrigan as Viktor
- Madiha Ansari as Fatima Farooqi
- Charlie Mann as Paul King
- Jason Patel as Pervez Sheikh
- Conor Lowson as Xavier Stead
- Rupert Procter as Bertie

== Episodes ==
| No. | Title | Directed by | Written by | Original release date | UK viewers (millions) |
|---|---|---|---|---|---|
| 1 | "Episode 1" | Mark Tonderai | A A Dhand | 10 February 2025 | 3.32 |
Detective Harry Virdee becomes deeply involved in the search for a missing teenager trapped in a county lines drug operation. After an impassioned plea from the boy's mother, Harry faces the temptation of stepping over a dangerous line.
| 2 | "Episode 2" | Mark Tonderai | A A Dhand | 17 February 2025 | 2.69 |
A shocking murder shakes Bradford's criminal underworld, intensifying rival gang conflicts. Harry's investigation into the killer takes him to the victim's ex-boyfriend, where he uncovers the hidden facets of her life. At the same time, Saima takes a daring step to repair strained family relationships.
| 3 | "Episode 3" | Mark Tonderai | A A Dhand; Danusia Samal | 24 February 2025 | N/A |
As the community struggles to recover from the nightclub attack, the killer escalates their actions with a high-profile abduction. The case garners national attention, prompting the UK Crime Agency to intervene, casting doubt on Harry and Conway's positions in the investigation.
| 4 | "Episode 4" | Milad Alami | A A Dhand; Namsi Khan | 3 March 2025 | N/A |
The killer raises the stakes, making it personal with a harrowing phone call to police headquarters that compels Harry to confront a painful memory from his past. Meanwhile, an unexpected revelation leads Saima to question everything she thought she knew about Harry and her brother.
| 5 | "Episode 5" | Mo Ali | A A Dhand; Nessa Muthy | 10 March 2025 | N/A |
After Harry is hospitalised following a near-fatal attack, the killer reaches out to the police with a proposition. Meanwhile, Vasil sets his sights on Riaz, driven by a thirst for revenge. Saima, determined to investigate her brother, stumbles upon revelations far beyond her expectations.
| 6 | "Episode 6" | Mo Ali | A A Dhand | 17 March 2025 | 2.42 |
In a tense showdown with the killer, Harry faces an unthinkable dilemma. With time slipping away and options dwindling, Harry takes a bold gamble, paving the way for a devastating climax.

== Production ==
Based on the character from the A A Dhand crime novels, which debuted in 2016 with Streets of Darkness, which in September 2023 was reported to be the novel being adapted into a six-part television series. However, later reports suggested it is actually the third novel, City of Sinners, which Dhand himself adapted for television.

Executive producer is Paul Trijbits for Magical Society, AA Dhand, and Jo McClellan for BBC. The series producer is Stella Nwimo and the series was co-produced by Gareth Coulam Evans, Callum Dodgson and Sylvie Richards. The series was scored by James Everingham, with the main theme composed by Everingham and Hans Zimmer and featuring Indian composer Shashwat Sachdev.

=== Casting ===
In August 2023, Sacha Dhawan was cast in the lead role. In February 2024, he was replaced in the role by Staz Nair.

=== Filming ===
Filming commenced in February 2024 in Bradford. Bradford is the 2025 UK City Of Culture and various iconic landmarks feature in the series.

== Broadcast ==
A premiere of the series was held at St George's Hall, Bradford on 6 February 2025 at a red carpet event, attended by Dhand, Nair, Kala, Bhai, and Ismeal, among others. The six-part series was shown in the UK on BBC One and BBC iPlayer on 10 February 2025.

The series was shown in Australia on SBS Television and streaming service SBS on Demand weekly from 27 March 2025.

== Soundtrack ==
Hans Zimmer and James Everingham composed the Virdee title theme and series score, featuring Shashwat Sachdev. Trainees from Screen Academy Bradford joined the scoring process to get a hands-on experience of composing for screen.

== Reception ==
Lucy Mangan in The Guardian praised the "satisfying plot" and the charisma of Nair as Virdee and "Dhand’s great talent for finding the emotionally universal in the culturally specific." Carol Midgely in The Times enjoyed the "strong" and "powerful” portrayal of the family dynamics in the series but cautioned viewers against the "barbarity" of the violence. Chris Bennison for The Telegraph favoured "the gentler domestic scenes" describing Kulvinder Ghir, as Virdee’s disapproving father, as "quietly impressive", and compared Nair to "Daniel Craig-era Bond" but for all the "vignettes that fascinate – the gangs specifically recruiting young South Asian women to deal drugs because the politically aware Bradford police don’t dare stop and search them" felt that "they get buried" by "crime-thriller tropes".
