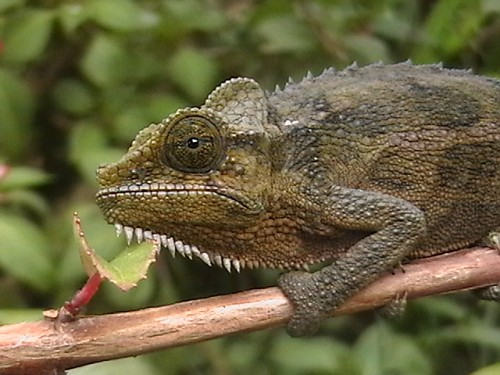

Conservation status
- Least Concern (IUCN 3.1)

Scientific classification
- Kingdom: Animalia
- Phylum: Chordata
- Class: Reptilia
- Order: Squamata
- Suborder: Iguania
- Family: Chamaeleonidae
- Genus: Trioceros
- Species: T. hoehnelii

Binomial name
- Trioceros hoehnelii (Steindachner, 1891)

Synonyms
- Chamael[e]on höhnelii Steindachner, 1891; Chamaeleon bitaeniatus hohneli — F. Werner, 1911; Chamaeleo (Trioceros) hoehnelii — Nečas, 1999; Trioceros hoehnelii — Tilbury & Tolley, 2009

= Trioceros hoehnelii =

Species of lizard

Trioceros hoehnelii, commonly known as von Höhnel's chameleon, the helmeted chameleon, and the high-casqued chameleon, is a species of chameleon, a lizard in the family Chamaeleonidae. The species is native to eastern Africa.

== Etymology ==
Both the specific name, hoehnelii, and one of the common names, "von Höhnel's chameleon", are in honor of Austrian explorer Ludwig von Höhnel (1857–1942).

== Geographic range ==
T. hoehnelii is found in Kenya and Uganda.

== Identification ==
T. hoehnelii is a small to medium-size chameleon, growing up to 10 inches (25.4 cm) in total length (including tail). Coloration is highly variable across its geographic range. During morning hours, it may be seen basking in the sunlight, almost completely black in color to capture heat energy from the sunlight. This species has a single horn on the rostrum, a serrated back crest, and a spiny throat crest. Males are typically larger than females with a larger casque, horn, and enlarged tail base.

== Behavior ==

Most chameleons in east Africa tend to be territorial and the high-casqued chameleon is no different. If males are placed together, they will hiss at each other, turn black, and inflate their bodies to make them look larger. Dominant males display brightly colored patterns that differ from females or subordinate males, which often persist until they are defeated during a courtship battle.

== Reproduction ==
T. hoehnelli bears live young via ovoviviparity. Sexually mature adults form stable pair bonds during the mating season, which endure throughout the five months of pregnancy. After the birth, the pair usually splits up.

== Diet ==
The high-casqued chameleon eats most small insects and spiders, and does so by extending the tongue to capture the prey. It is capable of extending the tongue more than a complete body length.
