= Wilh. Steinberg =

Piano manufacturer

- Company type: Private
- Industry: Musical instruments
- Founded: 1877; 149 years ago
- Headquarters: Eisenberg, Germany
- Products: Pianos
- Owner: Parsons Music Group
- Website: wilhsteinberg.de

Wilh. Steinberg is a brand name owned and used by the company Thüringer Pianoforte GmbH, a piano manufacturer in Eisenberg, Germany. The name is often used synonymously for the company itself.

The company was founded by the Geyer family in 1877 in Eisenberg, Germany. After the reunification of Germany the company merged with several other East German piano companies. In 2013, Wilh. Steinberg was bought by Parsons Music Group, a company based in Hong Kong.

With Parsons investment, Wilh. Steinberg was able to develop and expand their range of pianos.

== Grand piano models ==
=== Signature Series ===
These pianos are made in Germany with actions by Renner and keyboards by Kluge. Grand cabinets are supplied by Parsons Music in China.

Model	Length
S-212	212 cm
S-188	188 cm

=== Performance Series ===
Performance series models are entirely made by Parsons Music in China using Thüringer designs.

Model	Length
P-178	178 cm
P-165	165 cm
P-152	152 cm

=== WS Series ===
Model	Length
WS-D275	275 cm
WS-B211	211 cm
WS-A188	188 cm
WS-M170	170 cm

== Upright piano models ==
=== Signature Series ===
These pianos are made in Germany with actions by Renner and keyboards by Kluge. Cabinets for the verticals are made by Thüringer Pianoforte in its own facilities;

Model	Height
S-130CE	130 cm
S-130	130 cm
S-125	125 cm
S-117	117 cm

=== Performance Series ===
Performance series models are entirely made by Parsons Music in China using Thüringer designs.

Model	Height
P-125E	125 cm
P-121	121 cm
P-118	119 cm

=== AT Series ===
Model	Height
AT-28D	128 cm
AT-23D	123 cm
AT-18D	118 cm

=== AT-K Series ===
Model	Height
AT-K32	132 cm
AT-K30	130 cm
