= Ludwig von Höhnel =

Austrian naval officer and explorer

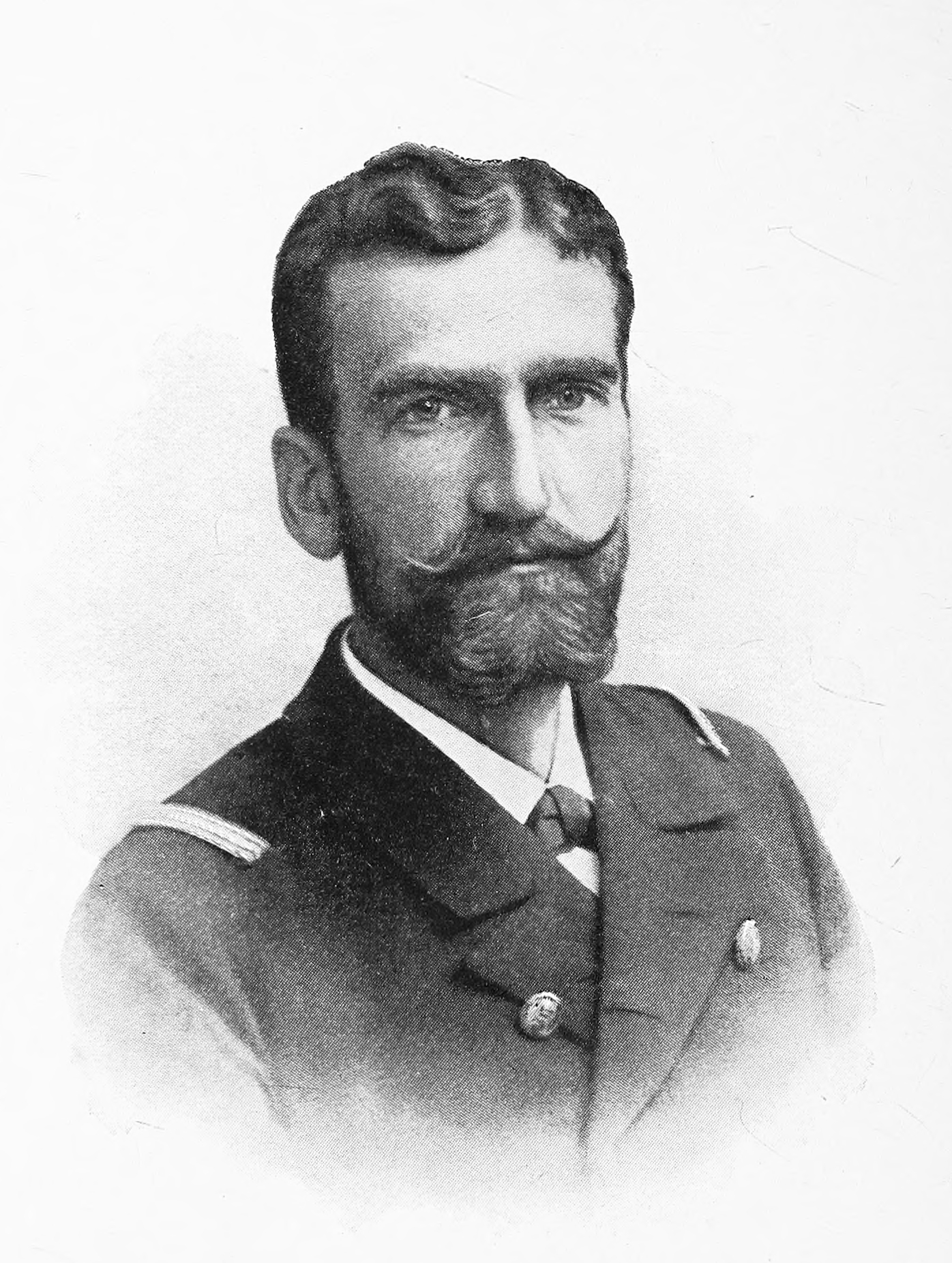
- Ludwig von Höhnel in 1892, from a photograph taken by William A. Chanler.
- Born: 6 August 1857; Preßburg
- Died: 23 March 1942 (aged 84); Vienna
- Burial place: Vienna Central Cemetery
- Spouse: Valeska von Ostéren (1870–1947)
- Military career
- Allegiance: Austria-Hungary
- Branch: Navy
- Service years: 1877–1909
- Rank: Rear Admiral
- Awards: Carl Ritter Medal in silver (1892)

Ludwig Ritter von Höhnel (6 August 1857, Preßburg – 23 March 1942, Vienna) was an Austrian naval officer and explorer. He was trained at the Imperial and Royal Naval Academy in Fiume, then part of the Austrian empire. His brother was the naturalist Franz Xaver Rudolf von Höhnel (1852–1920). Von Höhnel made two expeditions into East Africa into the Mount Kenya and Kilimanjaro regions.

== Early life ==
Höhnel was born in Pressburg (now Bratislava), the youngest of four sons of Dr. Gottfried Ritter von Höhnel (d. 1868), who moved from Trieste in 1864 to Pressburg to work as a finance director for the coastal region. He was admitted to the Imperial and Royal Naval Academy in Fiume in 1873, joining the Austro-Hungarian Navy as a naval cadet at Pola. He travelled widely and in 1887 he was promoted to naval lieutenant. He worked mainly from Pola and Zara, working with the hydrographic office at Pola. He sailed at various times with the Crown Prince Rudolf and his wife, Princess Stéphanie of Belgium, on the yacht Greif. He also sailed with Prince Leopold of Bavaria and the zoologist Alfred Brehm. His encounter with the crown prince who knew Count Teleki and the plan for an expedition to East Africa led to his being invited to join.

== Journey with Teleki 1887–1888 ==
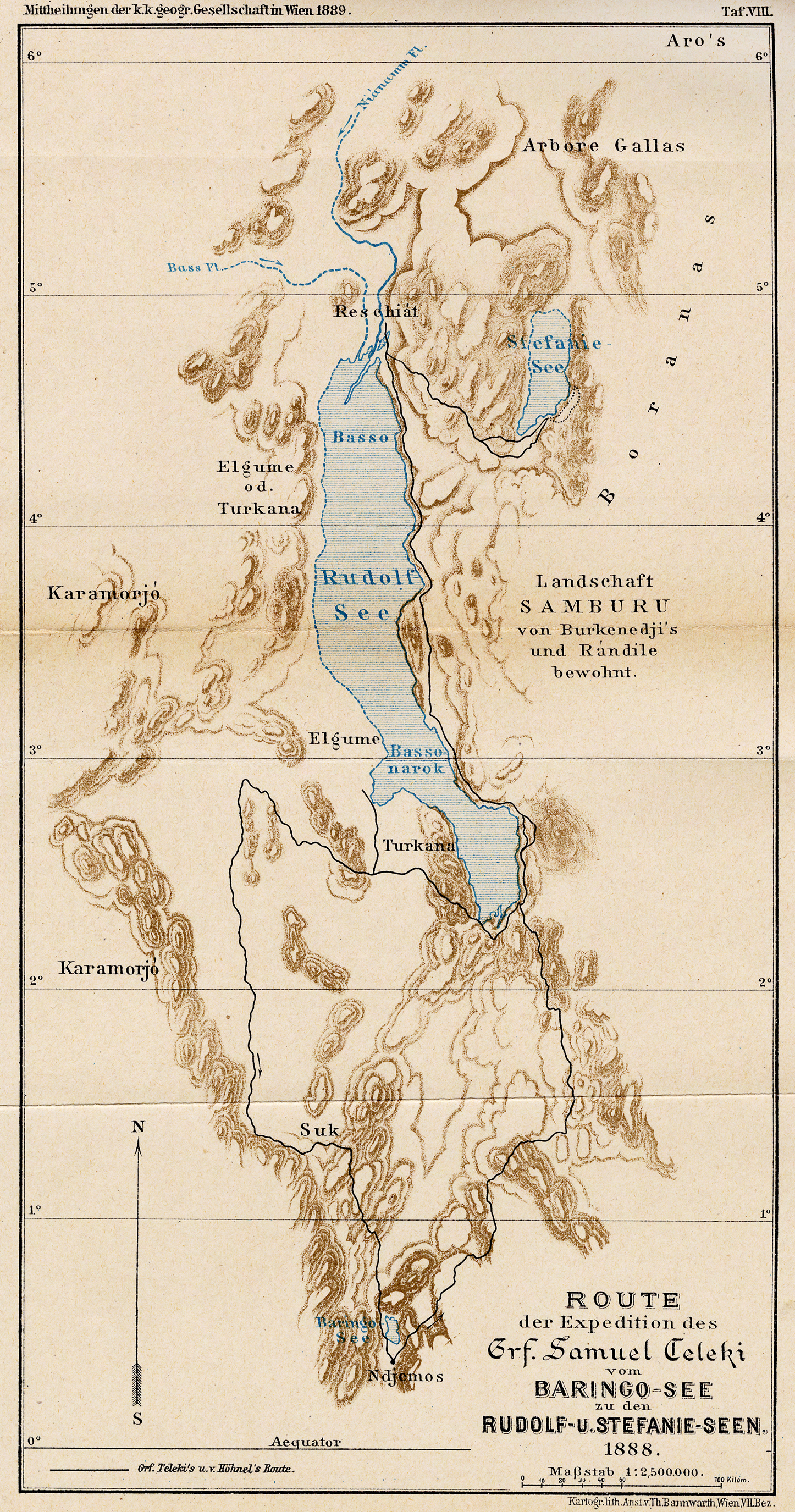
Route of Ludwig von Höhnel's travels with Teleki in East Africa.

Höhnel was the second-in-command of Count Sámuel Teleki von Szek's expedition to Northern Kenya in 1887–1888. He and Teleki were the first Europeans to see Lake Turkana, which they named Lake Rudolf after the expedition's patron Crown Prince Rudolf of Austria, and also Lake Stefanie, named after Prince Rudolf's wife Princess Stéphanie of Belgium. Höhnel acted as the expedition's cartographer, scientist, and diarist. Teleki and Höhnel made numerous observations on the climate, flora, and fauna of the territories visited and collected more than 400 ethnographical objects, most of them from Maasai and Kikuyu tribes. Their observations provided important contributions to ethnographical knowledge. The scientific results of the journey were published by Höhnel in several articles and in a book written in German and translated into Hungarian and English, titled The Discovery of Lakes Rudolf and Stefanie (1892). In 1892 Höhnel was awarded the Carl Ritter Medal (silver) "for a first successful pioneering trip and for [his] meritorious geographic performance." The East African chameleon, known as Höhnel's Chameleon (Trioceros hoehnelii) was named after Ludwig von Höhnel.

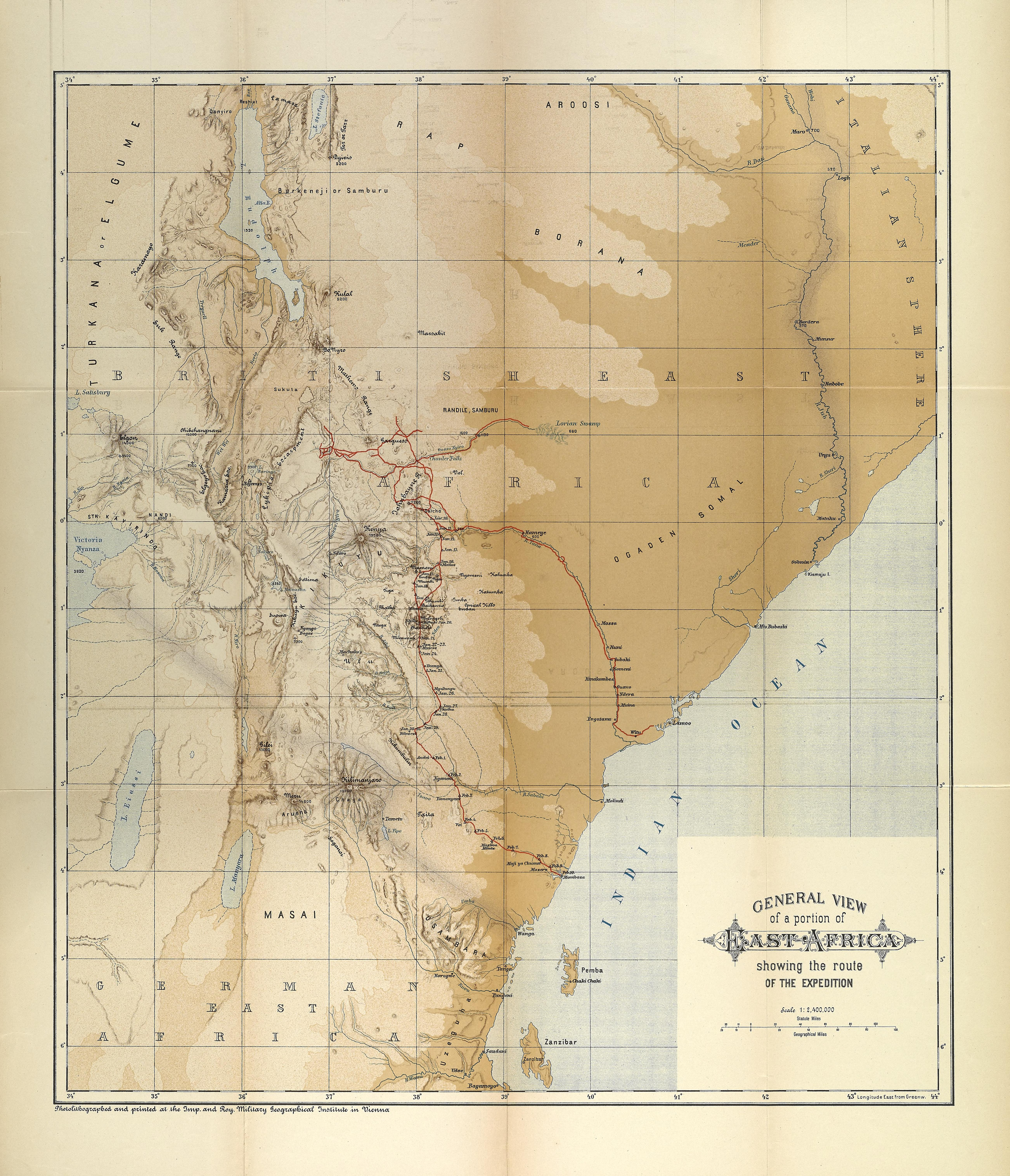
Map of East Africa exploration journey made by Chanler and Höhnel, 1892–1894, published in Through Jungle and Desert (1896).

== Journey with Chanler 1892–1894 ==
Between 1892 and 1894, Höhnel explored the territory in the vicinity of Mount Kilimanjaro with American magnate William Astor Chanler. They proceeded inland from the coast, mapping the north-eastern part of the Mount Kenya massif, the Guasso Nyiro River, the Lorian Swamp, the Tana River, Lake Rudolph and then Lake Stefanie. They were the first Europeans to come into contact with the Tigania, the Igembe Meru and the Rendille people in this region (Carl Peters had passed to the south in 1889). On 30 January 1893, they were attacked by some 200 warriors of the Wamsara (a subgroup of the Meru), who retreated after killing three porters. The expedition was eventually stranded in what is now the Meru North District of Kenya because of the death of all of its 165 pack animals (probably due to trypanosomiasis) and the desertion of many of the 200 porters. On 24 August 1893, Höhnel was gored by a rhinoceros in the groin and lower abdomen and was forced to leave Chanler, carried on a stretcher for 54 days, and return to Zanzibar where he was seen by an English surgeon. He then left for Vienna, arriving in February 1894. Out of about five hundred photos taken during the journey, 155 photographs taken by Höhnel have survived.

During this expedition, Höhnel and Chanler explored over 2,500 square miles (6,500 km^{2}) of previously unmapped territory, fixed the exact position of Mount Kenya, and viewed the Nyambeni hills, Chanler's Falls, and the Lorian Swamp, and mapped the course of the Ewaso Ng'iro River. Five specimens donated to the Smithsonian were previously unknown species, including two species of butterflies, two species of reptiles, and Chanler's Mountain Reedbuck.

== Later life ==
After recovering from his injuries, Höhnel became an officer in 1896 on board the corvette SMS Donau, and traveled in 1897 to the Mediterranean and along the coast of West Africa south to Cameroon, then across the Atlantic to the Caribbean, and to New York and Newport, Rhode Island. During the trip, the ship's captain suffered a heart attack and Höhnel was made provisional commandant until June 1898. Also on this voyage, he met the future US president Theodore Roosevelt, who was then in his words the 'much feared' police commissioner of New York. After this, Höhnel was assigned as an officer of the deck to the central battery ship SMS Tegetthoff, whose executive officer was Commander Anton Haus, the future commander of the Austro-Hungarian Navy.

In 1899 Höhnel became Emperor Franz Joseph's aide-de-camp and later (1905–09) led an official Austro-Hungarian delegation to Emperor Menelik II of Ethiopia. He also commanded the Austro-Hungarian torpedo cruiser SMS Panther in a voyage to Australia and Polynesia in the summer of 1905. Höhnel was instrumental in introducing the chamois into New Zealand, negotiating the acquisition in 1905 of six does and two bucks from Neuberg in Austria. They finally arrived in New Zealand on board the SMS Turakino in 1907. He was the commanding officer of the armored cruiser SMS Sankt Georg and the commander of the navy yard in Pula.

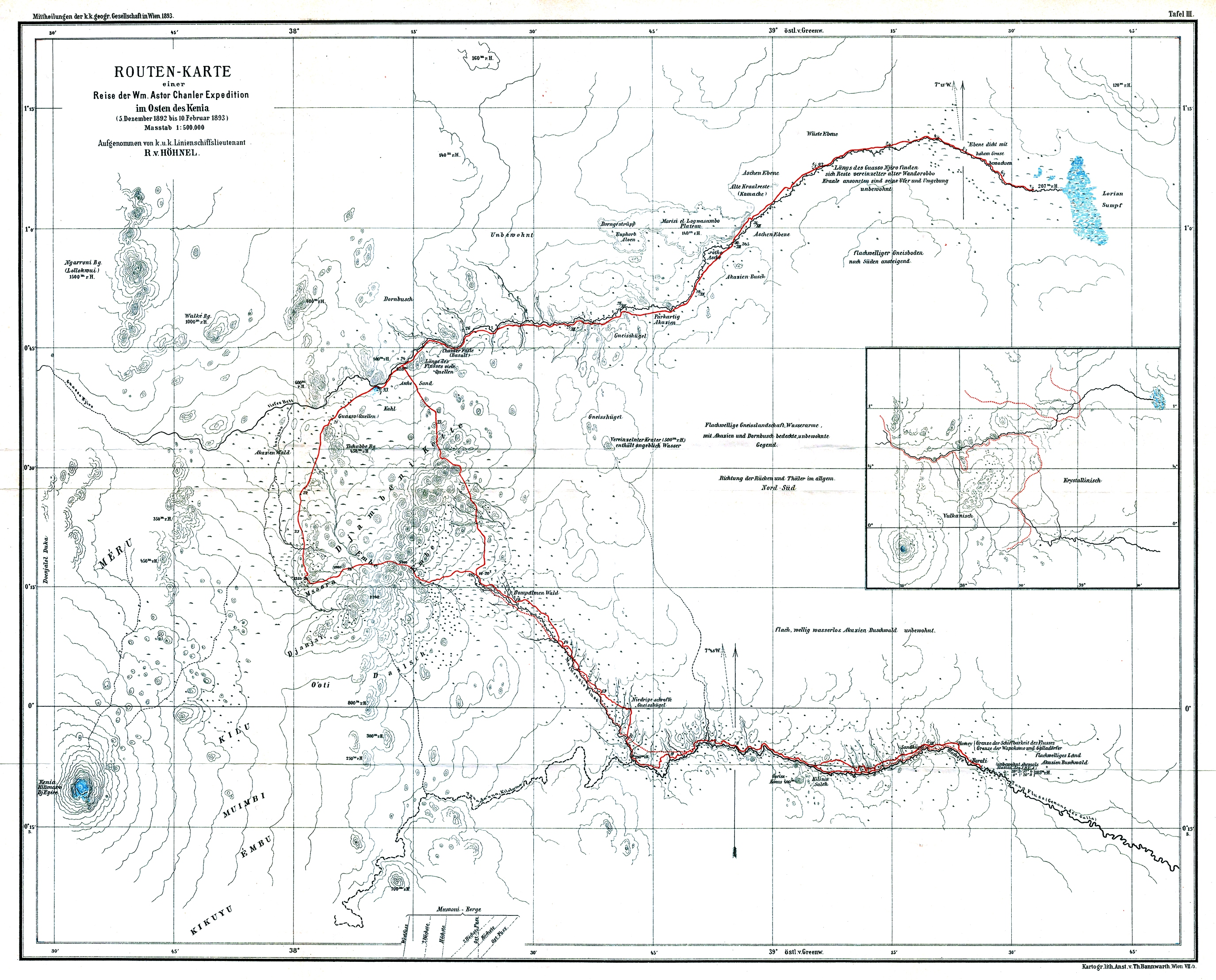
Höhnel's map of his travels with Chanler in East Africa, 1892–93.

In February 1907, he submitted a formal request to the navy for permission to marry Valeska von Ostéren (1870–1947) (permission was required as per Austrian naval regulations). However, permission was denied, because it was discovered that Valeska's brother had published an anti-Jesuit novel in 1906 which offended the powerful Archduke Franz Ferdinand. Höhnel was eventually forced to choose between his marriage and his naval career. He married Valeska in August 1909 and subsequently resigned from the rank of captain. In 1912 he was promoted to rear admiral, probably in recognition of his duties as aide-de-camp to the emperor.

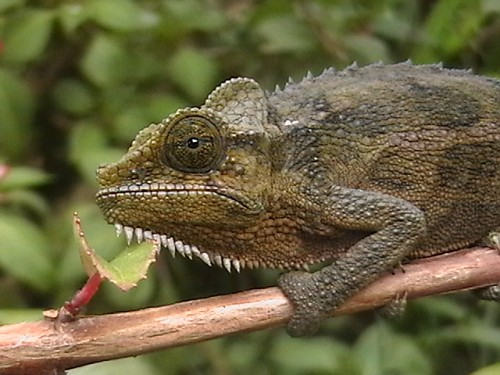
Trioceros hoehnelii, also known as von Höhnel's Chameleon.

=== Post-naval career ===
Höhnel wrote an autobiography centered on the turbulent years preceding the fall of the Austro-Hungarian monarchy, providing insights into African exploration, the Austro-Hungarian Navy, and prominent personalities of the Habsburg court, including Admiral Hermann von Spaun, Admiral Maximilian Daublebsky von Sterneck, and Rudolf Montecuccoli. The complete manuscript remained in the possession of the family of William Astor Chanler for many decades and was finally published in 2000.

Höhnel later wrote a 56-page account of his service as aide-de-camp to the Emperor Franz Joseph I of Austria, which was never published.

He died in Vienna in March 1942 and is buried in the Vienna Central Cemetery.

== Legacy ==
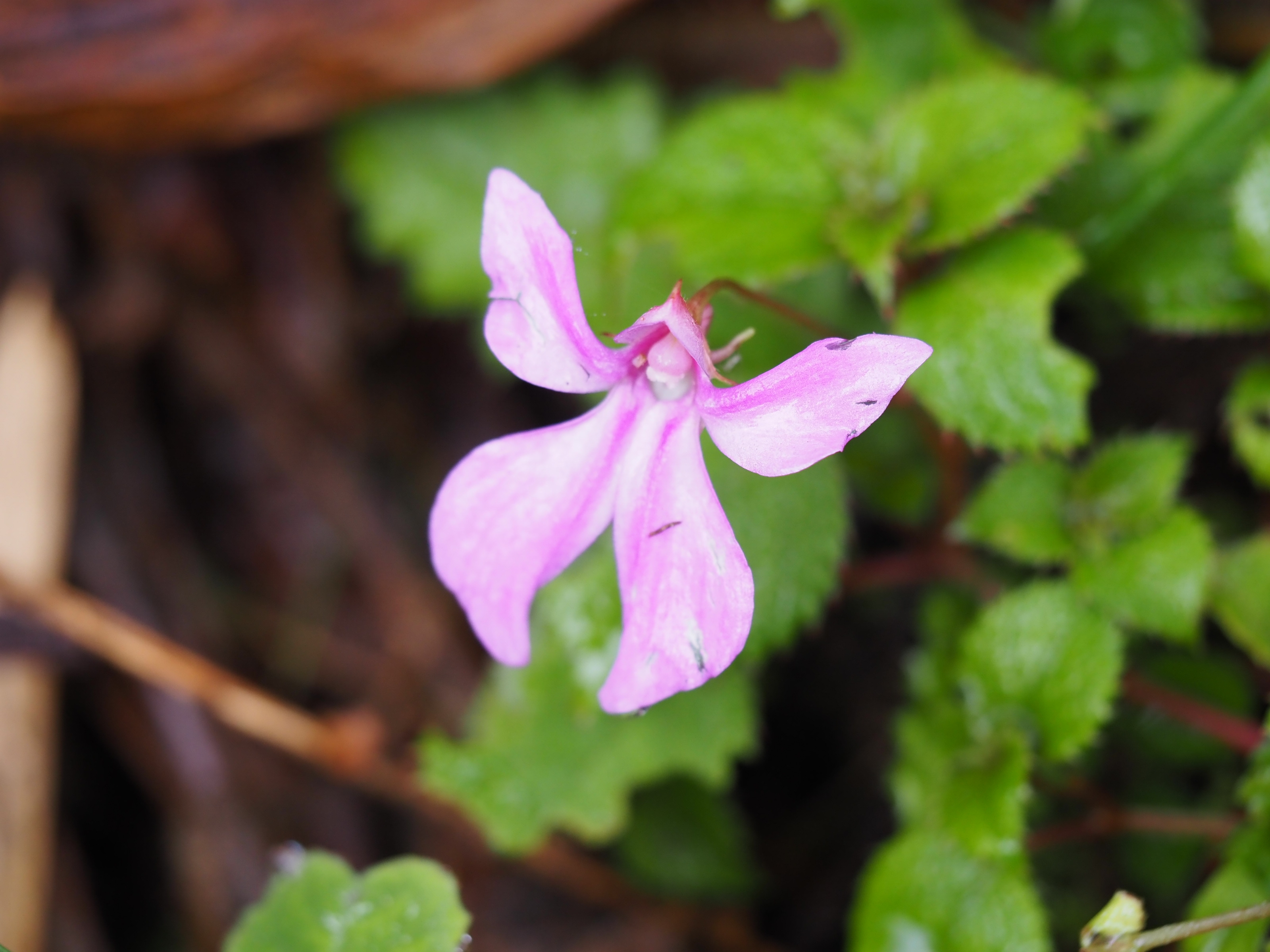
Impatiens hoehnelii

Höhnel is commemorated in the scientific name of several species from East Africa including a species of chameleon, Trioceros hoehnelii and the plant Impatiens hoehnelii. In 1958 the Ludwig von Höhnel Lane in Vienna was named after him. A valley on Mount Kenya, Hohnel Valley, was named after him by Teleki.

== Publications ==
- Discovery of lakes Rudolf and Stefanie: a narrative of Count Samuel Teleki's exploring & hunting expedition in Eastern Equatorial Africa in 1887 & 1888, translated by Nancy Bell. In 2 vols. (Longmans, 1896). Original in German: Zum Rudolph-See und Stephanie-See, 1892.
- Over Land and Sea: Memoir of an Austrian Rear Admiral's Life in Europe and Africa, 1857–1909, ed. Ronald E. Coons and Pascal James Imperato; consulting ed. J. Winthrop Aldrich. New York and London: Holmes & Meier, 2000. Original in German: Mein Leben zur See, auf Forschungsreisen und bei Hofe, 1926.

== Bibliography ==
- Sieche, Erwin F. (1990). "Austria-Hungary's Last Visit to the USA". Warship International. XXVII (2): 142–164. ISSN 0043-0374.
