= Fairview Portals =

Immersive video studio

- Company type: Subsidiary
- Industry: Animation
- Founded: 2020 (6 years ago)
- Founders: Jon Favreau
- Headquarters: U.S.
- Products: Virtual worlds
- Parent: Fairview Entertainment

Fairview Portals is a creative studio, founded by Jon Favreau in 2020, which builds next-generation virtual worlds. It has created immersive content in physical and virtual environments and has collaborated with Apple, Disney, Lucasfilm, Roblox and MGM Resorts.

In 2024, Fairview Portals, in partnership with Apple, released Encounter Dinosaurs, a short film created in Apple Immersive Video for the Apple Vision Pro.

Fairview Portals is owned by Favreau's Fairview Entertainment.
