= List of Dalziel and Pascoe episodes =

Logo

The following is a list of episodes of the BBC television detective drama series Dalziel and Pascoe. 61 episodes of the series were broadcast over the course of twelve series.

== Series overview ==
Series	Episodes	Originally released	
Series	Episodes	First released	Last released
1	3	16 March 1996	30 March 1996
2	4	14 June 1997	12 July 1997
3	4	21 March 1998	25 October 1998
4	4	12 June 1999	3 July 1999
5	4	1 July 2000	22 July 2000
6	4	29 October 2001	19 November 2001
7	6	30 September 2002	21 December 2002
8	4	3 January 2004	24 January 2004
9	8	30 January 2005	20 February 2005
10	10	6 March 2006	10 April 2006
11	4	3 September 2006	11 September 2006
12	6	6 May 2007	21 June 2007

== Episodes ==
=== Series 1 (1996) ===
No.	Title	Directed by	Written by	Original release date
1	"A Clubbable Woman"	Ross Devenish	Alan Plater	16 March 1996
Dalziel is forced to accept new recruit Sgt. Peter Pascoe as the pair team up for the very first time to investigate a serious murder case. Wetherton Rugby Club's golden boy, Sam Connon, wakes up after arriving at home with a hangover, to find his wife, Mary, dead in the armchair. Being vice-president of the rugby club himself, Dalziel decides to ruffle a few feathers and find out who had enough of a motive to want to kill her. However, with the murder weapon nowhere to be found, evidence of the killer's involvement is rather thin on the ground. The discovery of hidden 'dirty' letters, discussion of naked foreplay at the bedroom window and the unearthing of the murder weapon during the search for a missing eight-year-old boy make for the final pieces of the puzzle. Does someone at the rugby club bear a terrible grudge against the couple – or is the true murderer closer to home?
2	"An Advancement of Learning"	Maurice Phillips	Alan Plater	23 March 1996
Dalziel and Pascoe are thrown into university life when the body of a former university principal, Alison Girling, who supposedly died in a bus crash in Austria, is found underneath her own memorial statue in the university car park. Speaking to all of the staff who worked with Girling prior to her death, Dalziel struggles to make any headway until the body of Anita Sewell, a student accusing another staff member of sexual harassment is found naked on a nearby golf course. Suspecting they may have a serial killer on their hands, the pair follow the trail straight to the doorstep of the accused – Sam Fallowfield – only to find his house trashed and gay slurs written all over the wall. Suspecting the culprit is closer to home, Dalziel blows his top when he arrives back at the university to find his temporary police HQ has been trashed by students. And then Fallowfield is found dead.
3	"An Autumn Shroud"	Richard Standeven	Malcolm Bradbury	30 March 1996
Having persuaded Pascoe to marry the long-suffering Ellie, Dalziel finds himself with the opportunity to whisk himself away on holiday while Pascoe is on honeymoon. But, as ever, events fail to go to plan when Dalziel's car breaks down and he finds himself amidst a river funeral procession. Invited to stay at the deceased's house by his attractive widow, Dalziel believes all his dreams have come true, until her son goes missing, the housekeeper ends up dead in Epping Forest and an insurance investigator with a tip-off about an insurance scam regarding the family's newest business venture ends up drowned in a nearby lake. Suspecting that the housekeeper was selling information to the taxman regarding the family's scams, Dalziel discovers that the deceased's death, supposedly by an accident with an electric drill – which allowed the family to claim for life insurance – was in fact due to a heart attack. Featuring Francesca Annis as Bonnie Fielding, Robin Bailey as Hereward Fielding, David Royle as Det Sgt Edgar Wield, Pip Donaghy as Det Sgt Cross, Michael Coles as Papworth, Susannah Wise as Louise Fielding, Daniel Ryan as Bertie Fielding, Glenn Hugill as Charlie Tillotson, William Mannering as Nigel Fielding, Anthony Hunt as Hank Uniff, Carmel Howard as Mavis Uniff, Chrissy Rock as Annie Greave, John Axon as Spinx, Jon Strickland as DCI Baldestone and Susannah Corbett as Ellie Pascoe. The title of Reginald Hill's original novel was "An April Shroud".

=== Series 2 (1997) ===
No.	Title	Directed by	Written by	Original release date
4	"Ruling Passion"	Gareth Davies	Malcolm Bradbury	14 June 1997
After being kept late by "The Fat Controller", as Ellie puts it, Pascoe and his wife finally head out on their romantic weekend break to meet up with some old friends, only to find a house full of dead bodies and his best friend nowhere to be found. Pascoe is thrown into the middle of a complex investigation, involving villagers' secrets, an unpublished manuscript and a suicide note. Meanwhile, back home, Dalziel is on the trail of a burglar who urinated in a elderly woman's kettle while robbing her most valued collectibles. The murder of an aspiring estate agent, which at first appears to be entirely unconnected, soon provides the missing piece of the puzzle. Pascoe is smug when Ellie manages to identify the bungling burglar before Dalziel, and his promotion to inspector finally comes to fruition, with delight. The Pascoe's daughter is born and Dalziel agrees to be godfather. Featuring Susannah Corbett as Ellie Pascoe, Michael Pennington as Hartley Culpepper, Patrick Ryecart as Anton Davenant, Peter Blythe as Supt Derek Backhouse, Freddie Jones as French, David Royle as Det Sgt Edgar Wield, Navin Chowdhry as Police Cadet Sanjay Singh, Joseph Morton as Carlo, Rupam Maxwell as Timmo Mansfield, Matthew Radford as Colin Hopkins, Victoria Korner as Rose Hopkins, Andrew McCulloch as Sam Dixon, Philip Manikum as Det Sgt Crowther, Andrew Callaway as Det Sgt Hamblin, Davyd Harries as Angus Pelman, Meg Davies as Marianne Culpepper, Laurence Harrington as James Palfrey, Olive Pendleton as Mavis Sturgeon and Mark Benton as Jonathan Etherege.
5	"A Killing Kindness"	Edward Bennett	Malcolm Bradbury	21 June 1997
Dalziel and Pascoe find themselves on the trail of "The Choker", a serial killer who strangles young girls and then phones the local newspaper with quotes from Shakespeare's Hamlet. His latest victims include 18-year-old bank worker Brenda Sorby, who is found in the Wetherton canal the morning after meeting up with her boyfriend and asking him to marry her. Having been spotted at a nearby funfair shortly before her death, Dalziel decides to pay a visit to the clairvoyant after she reveals to Brenda's mother the last moments of her daughter's life. However, Dalziel receives a shock when he finds the body of the clairvoyant's niece, 18-year-old Pauline Stanhope. The trail leads the detective duo to a nearby gypsy camp, where Dalziel finds several of Brenda's missing personal effects, but his investigation is scuppered when he manages to beat seven bells out of a suspect. Featuring Susannah Corbett as Ellie Pascoe, David Royle as Det Sgt Edgar Wield, Navin Chowdhry as Police Cadet Sanjay Singh, Martin Reeve as Alistair Mulgan, Danielle Tilley as Brenda Sorby, Dina Mousawi as Maureen Brighouse, Nick Bagnall as Tommy Maggs, Stephen Hackett as Ron Ludlam, Fred Pearson as Dr Vickery, Eamonn Riley as Sam Hunmanby, Sheila Kelley as Mrs Sorby, Carmen Gómez as Rosetta Stanhope, Elizabeth Ann O'Brien as Pauline Stanhope, Ken Kitson as Jack Sorby, Paul Simpson as Ian, Josephine Butler as Andrea Valentine, Richard Hawley as Mark Wildgoose, Garry Crystal as Darren, Marion Bailey as Lorraine Wildgoose, Paul Goodwin as Austin Greenall, Julie Graham as Adi Pritchard, Maggie Jones as Ena Cooper, Vince Pellegrino as Dan Cordeski, and Paul Butterworth as Vicar.
6	"Deadheads"	Edward Bennett	Alan Plater	28 June 1997
Dick Elgood, the owner of a local firm specialising in bathroom products, makes an off-the-record complaint to Pascoe about one of his employees, Patrick Aldermann, who he suspects is responsible for murder. An investigation into the complaint suggests that over the course of thirty years, six people in relation to Aldermann have all died suspiciously, and that each time, Aldermann has benefited from their death. Dalziel recognises Aldermann's mother, Penny, as one of his old flames from the rugby club, and as such decides to pay her visit to her swanky London pad – only for the dinner date to end in disaster and Dalziel getting a punch in the face from a burglar for all his troubles. PC Singh makes a deal with a group of local vandals in order to secure information that leads to the discovery that Daphne – Mrs. Aldermann – has been having an affair with Dick Elgood.
7	"Exit Lines"	Ross Devenish	Stephen Lowe	12 July 1997
After leaving a country-house do a little more than worse for wear, Dalziel and his best mate Arnie head home, only for their car to collide with a passing cyclist on a country lane, knocking him down, and killing him. Arnie says he was at the wheel at the time of the man's death, but neither Pascoe nor the chief constable are 100% convinced, and the testimony of a waitress at the do seems to add to their suspicions. Meanwhile, Pascoe investigates the murder of a former soldier, who is found dead in the bath, with a number of his personal possessions missing. Pascoe initially suspects that his grandson, a fellow soldier, is responsible after his grandfather offered him £500 to buy an engagement ring, thus making the boy aware that his grandfather had a substantial sum of money stashed away. However, the spotlight soon manages to find itself on one of the boy's soldier comrades.

=== Series 3 (1998) ===
No.	Title	Directed by	Written by	Original release date
8	"Under World"	Edward Bennett	Michael Chaplin (screenplay) Reginald Hill (novel)	21 March 1998
Dalziel and Pascoe investigate when the skeleton of missing miner Billy Farr is found in a mineshaft in the Yorkshire coalfields, four years after his disappearance. At the time, a seven-year-old girl was murdered, and initially, a serial killer who confessed to killing five other girls was suspected. However, she was good friends with Farr, and due to the fact they both went missing on the same day, certain townsfolk believed he was somehow responsible. His son, Colin, fails to cope with the discovery well, and leans on his college lecturer for guidance – who happens to be none other than Ellie. Torn between staying loyal to her husband and supporting her student, Ellie helps Colin to do a runner when a second body is found down the mines – this time that of mining boss Heppelthwaite. Discovering the motive for Billy's killing, Pascoe races to catch the suspect – but Colin manages to find him first. Featuring Susannah Corbett as Ellie Pascoe, Joe Duttine as Colin Farr, Russell Dixon as Harold Satterthwaite, Nathaniel Duncan as Tommy Dickinson, Joy Brook as Stella Mycroft, Bob Mason as Arthur Downey, Polly Hemmingway as May Farr, David Fleeshman as Pedro Pedley, Martin Milman as Neville Watmough, David Royle as Det Sgt Edgar Wield, Derek Hicks as Gavin Mycroft, John Vine as Monty Boyle, Robert Whelan as Moffat, Philip Ralph as Uniformed Policeman and Jim Millea as Police Sergeant.
9	"Child's Play"	David Wheatley	Michael Chaplin (screenplay); Reginald Hill (novel)	28 March 1998
The funeral of an elderly Italian woman is interrupted by the arrival of her son, thought missing since 1944. Her relatives suspect that his abrupt appearance is only to collect his inheritance, as he is her sole beneficiary. Not all of her relatives are convinced he is who he says he is, but a fraudster. But before his identity can be verified, he is shot at the wheel of his car, parked in the police station car park. Dalziel and Pascoe identify the killer and the rightful beneficiary of the money. Meanwhile, Wield's private life nearly hits the front pages when a friend of his ex-partner threatens to blow the whistle on his sexuality, if he doesn't help him find his father who disappeared many years ago. The chief constable is not best pleased when the news gets back to him, and asks Dalziel to expose his friend. Featuring David Royle as Det Sgt Edgar Wield, Margaret Tyzack as Ella Keech, Bryan Pringle as John Huby, Linda Marlowe as Stephanie Windibanks, Jack Hedley as Alessandro Pontelli, Cathy Sara as Lexie Huby, Jamie Glover as Rod Lomas, John Michie as Andrew Goodenough, Gawn Grainger as Eden Thackeray, Eugene Walker as Gravedigger, Marcus Romer as Vicar, Hosh Ibraham as Cliff Sharman, Michael Skyers as Othello, Shaughan Seymour as Ike Ogilby, Fred Pearson as Dr Vickery, Frances Cox as Mrs Sharman, Iain Rogerson as Club Barman and Malcolm Tierney as DCC Raymond.
10	"Bones and Silence"	Maurice Phillips	Alan Plater (screenplay); Reginald Hill (novel)	18 October 1998
Dalziel witnesses a death by gunshot in his neighbourhood, with the two men involved protesting that they were simply trying to stop the victim killing herself. Dalziel believes her husband, Philip Swain, murdered her, viewing him as the embodiment of evil. The other suspect, Greg Waterson, absconds, and Wield is beaten up by a group of local homophobes. Theatre director Eileen Anstiss casts Dalziel as God and Swain as Lucifer in a community mystery play, while Dalziel is sent a series of letters from a woman contemplating suicide. It transpires that Mrs Swain was killed ten days prior to the shooting incident and buried underneath the police department's new car park, while the murdered woman was a drug addict known to Waterson. Although Swain argues that his wife's death was an accident, he is caught in a lie over where her body was kept, incriminating him in another murder. Ellie realises that Eileen is writing the suicide notes to Dalziel, but Pascoe is unable to prevent her from jumping to her death during the play's dress rehearsal. Featuring Susannah Corbett as Ellie Pascoe, David Royle as Det Sgt Edgar Wield, Michael Kitchen as Philip Swain, Josette Simon as Eileen Anstiss, Paul Brooke as Canon Eustice Horncastle, Carmel Howard as Hedda, Duncan Holmes as George Tesman, Roger Heathcott as Judge Brack, Angus Wright as Greg Waterson, Adrian Irvine as Dr Marwood, Jacqueline Defferary as Pamela Waterson, Joanna van Gyseghem as Mrs Dorothy Horncastle, Justin Chadwick as DC Seymour, Gawn Grainger as Eden Thackeray, Anna Clarkson as Shirley Appleyard, John Branwell as Arnie Stringer, Iain Fraser as Govan, Damian Myerscough as Harold Park, Paul Williams as Medwin, Catherine Terris as Mrs Stringer/Beverley King, Geoffrey Wilkinson as Desk Sergeant, Barry Stanton as Joe Swindles and Malcolm Raeburn as Chief Constable Trimble.
11	"The Wood Beyond"	Edward Bennett	Ed Whitmore	25 October 1998
A group of animal rights protesters who break into a medical facility find more than they bargain for when one escapes from the clutches of security into the nearby woods, only to find the remains of a dead body. Dalziel's not best pleased when he is forced to give up watching his rugby match to attend the scene. Meanwhile, after his grandmother suddenly dies, Pascoe tries to find out what happened to his grandfather who, during World War one, apparently deserted from a medical hospital to sail to America. He discovers that his grandfather stumbled upon the actions of a military doctor, who was giving his patients lethal injections of poison in order to kill them, and suspects somebody killed him, to silence him before he could reveal the truth. Tracing back the history of the medical hospital through the records, Pascoe suspects the body in the woods may be his grandfather, or someone close to him. Featuring Susannah Corbett as Ellie Pascoe, David Royle as Det Sgt Edgar Wield, Frances Barber as Amanda 'Cap' Marvell, Katie Blake as Ada Pascoe, Shaun Dooley as Robert Pascoe, Jimmy Reddington as Arthur Batty, David Blair as Herbert Batty, John Burton as Recruiting Sergeant, Ben Crompton as Olly, Steve Money as Davis, David Prosho as Jimmy Howard, Holly Newman as Lab Assistant, Julie Hesmondhalgh as Wendy Walker, Thomas Russell as David Batty, Vincent Marzello as Noah Seger, Richard Lynson as Seger's Assistant, Mark Spalding as Don Patten, Fred Pearson as Dr Vickery, Francis Lee as Soldier, Rob Swinton as Museum Guard, Nicholas Selby as Major Studholme, Kenneth Hadley as Solicitor and Deirdre Doone as Mrs Fairclough.

=== Series 4 (1999) ===
Beginning with this series, the show's title music has been removed.

No.	Title	Directed by	Written by	Original release date
12	"On Beulah Height"	Maurice Phillips	Michael Chaplin (screenplay); Reginald Hill (novel)	12 June 1999
Dalziel and Pascoe investigate the disappearance of a young girl, in similar circumstances to another girl who had disappeared in the same place fifteen years before. The initial suspect at the time of the first investigation was Benny Lightfoot, a local farmhand who himself vanished shortly after the girl's disappearance. And when graffiti in the words of 'Benny's Back' appears close to the site of the recent disappearance, Dalziel suspects that he may be back to strike again. However, all is not as it seems, as the little girl's companion, Tig the dog, leads Wieldy right to her body, buried inside a small cave on Beulah Height. As each and every one of the local's lives come under scrutiny, the discovery of Benny Lightfoot's corpse beneath the remains of a house flooded by a reservoir prove to be the final clue in identifying the killer. Meanwhile, Pascoe has to deal with family grief as his daughter is rushed to hospital with meningitis. Featuring Susannah Corbett as Ellie Pascoe, David Royle as Det Sgt Edgar Wield, Ronald Pickup as Walter Wulfstan, Tom Georgeson as Jack Allgood, Abigail Fawcett as Lorraine Dacre, Rosie Millar as Rosie Pascoe, Kaye Wragg as Betsy Allgood (Elizabeth Wulfstan), Robin Pirongs as Derek Purlingstone, Joanna David as Chloe Wulfstan, Jim Millea as Tom Dacre, Janys Chambers as Karen Dacre, Jo-Anne Stockham as DC Shirley Novello, Emma Fallon as young Mary Wolfstan, Beatrice Kelley as Mrs Elsie Coe, Phil Croft as Search Co-ordinator, Tim Barker as Helicopter Camera Operator, James Kennedy as Bobby Slater, Trevor Cooper as Geordie Turnbull, Hayley Garbett as young Betsy Allgood, Louise Papillon as Mrs Saltaire, Richard Albrecht as Diver Tom Perriman, Graham Colclough as Doctor Curtis and Malcolm Tierney as Chief Constable Raymond.
13	"Recalled to Life"	Suri Krishnamma	Timothy Prager (screenplay); Reginald Hill (novel)	19 June 1999
The thirty-year-old murder case of Pamela Westropp is reviewed when the accused, Cissy Kohler, states she was coerced into giving a false confession. Having investigated the original case himself alongside his former boss, Wally, Dalziel is immediately told to stay away from the case, and instead, a high-flying DCC from London, Hiller, is brought in to lead the case. Unhappy with the decision, Dalziel decides to do a little investigating of his own, and manages to obtain papers on the case, which Hiller is looking for. However, he soon realises that Hiller is prepared to stop at nothing when he arrives home to find his house trashed, as if someone was looking for the papers. Meanwhile, as Kohler is released, she is informed that James Westropp, thought dead since 1968, is still alive, and after a little persuasion from an old friend with a grudge, decides to hunt him down to finish him off. Featuring Susannah Corbett as Ellie Pascoe, David Royle as Det Sgt Edgar Wield, Shirley Anne Field as Cissy Kohler, Tom Bell as Oliver Fisher, Leslie Phillips as James Westropp, Danny Webb as Deputy Chief Constable Geoff Hiller, Alistair Petrie as Young James Westropp, Mali Harries as Young Cissy Kohler, Clare Swinburne as Pamela Westropp, Gideon Turner as Young Thomas Partridge, Kate Godfrey as Young Mavis Marsh, Aran Bell as Young Oliver Fisher, Burt Caesar as Philip Jacklin, Simon Williams as Sir Thomas Partridge, Jannine Ridge as TV Reporter, Joseph O'Conor as Wally Tallantire, Ava Hunt as Female Reporter, Jerome J Wright as Lang, Alex Giannini as Det Insp Stubbs, Amanda Walker as Mavis Marsh, Russell Richardson as Young Wally Tallantire, Nicholas Rawlinson as Philip Westropp, Christie Jennings as Clinic Receptionist, Merelina Kendall as Woman Traveller, Fred Pearson as Dr Vickery, Rosie Millar as Rosie Pascoe and Malcolm Tierney as Chief Constable Raymond.
14	"Time to Go"	Suri Krishnamma	David Ashton	26 June 1999
The death of young man, Zachary, who lapsed into a coma at a rave after taking illegal drugs, is investigated. It is initially suspected that he died of an overdose, but when the post mortem report reveals that the drugs contain traces of cyanide and high concentrations of nutmeg, Dalziel realises the boy had been poisoned. And when someone breaks into Zachary's garage looking for a photo, and Zachary's dad's shop is turned upside down, Dalziel suspects that someone has a vengeance against this boy. Club owners Nicholas and Sophie are soon put in the frame when club manager, Snake, is found suffocated in his office, with tabs of ecstasy laid on his eyes, and regular E.T. arrives just in time to spot someone who he suspects to be Sophie committing the murder. Meanwhile, Dalziel is forced to face up to his personal demons when he arrests his ex-wife's son, Boris, for drug dealing at the club. Featuring Susannah Corbett as Ellie Pascoe, David Royle as Det Sgt Edgar Wield, Harriet Walter as Mary Waddell, Bernard Cribbins as Uncle Henry, Sarah-Jane Potts as Sophie Richmond, Andrew Lee Potts as Nicholas Richmond, Graham Bryan as Zachary Graham, Neil Newbon as E.T., James Bannon as Tony, Steve Sweeney as Snake, Ruaraidh Murray as Boris Waddell, Robert Demeger as Charlie Forbes, Marc Finn as Ted, Katherine Wogan as Doctor, Jeffery Kissoon as Mr Graham, Jacqueline Dutoit as Mrs Graham, Fred Pearson as Dr Vickery, Simon Nock as PC Hector, Emily Corrie as Zoe Patterson, Olegario Fedoro as Dentist, Jo Rafferty as Cleaner, Joyce Gibbs as Elderly Lady, Jodie Watson as WPC, Anne Orwin as Mrs Erskine and Malcolm Tierney as Chief Constable Raymond.
15	"The British Grenadier"	Maurice Phillips	Michael Chaplin	3 July 1999
Pub landlord Frank Moon returns after a serious row with his wife Stella the night before, and decides it's time for action – taking his wife, and everybody else inside the pub hostage at gunpoint. As well as all of his regulars, Dalziel also happens to be in the pub at the time, and is forced to keep quiet in order to prevent his cover being blown. As Moon tries to make a run for it with Stella in tow, he is confronted outside by the local bobby, PC Clarke, whom he has no hesitation in shooting. Having hot-tailed it back to where he started, he faces a series of unfortunate events, including: one of his elderly female hostages fainting, old regular Harry dying of natural causes, negotiations with an old war friend resulting in him being shot, and Pascoe being taken hostage too. As Dalziel hatches a plan to get everyone out alive, little did he bargain for a trigger happy police officer pointing his way. Featuring Dennis Waterman as Frank Moon, David Royle as Det Sgt Edgar Wield, Patricia Kerrigan as Stella Moon, Elliot Walton-Frew as Freddie Moon, Lee Ingleby as Kieron Cumming, Vinnie McCabe as Patrick Drury, Walter Sparrow as Harry Barstow, Emma Rydal as Lesley, Rosalind Knight as Brigid Stewart, Joan Campion as Rosemary Grainger, Brian Hibbard as Nye Pritchard, Jo-Anne Stockham as DC Shirley Novello and Malcolm Tierney as Chief Constable Raymond.

=== Series 5 (2000) ===
Series goes to widescreen (16:9) beginning with this series.

No.	Title	Directed by	Written by	Original release date
16	"A Sweeter Lazarus"	Stephen Whittaker	Michael Jenner	1 July 2000
When a suspected serial killer jumps to his death from the roof of a homeless hostel, the only witnesses are Pascoe and a homeless girl, who goes by the name of Abbie Hallingsworth—a girl who has been missing for nineteen years. DC Shaz Kendall, on attachment to Wetherton CID, invites Abbie to stay while she tries to find out more about the events leading up to her disappearance. However, her coy tactics of introducing her to her long lost family lands her in hot water with Dalziel. As her long lost brother orders a DNA test to prove her identity, DC Kendall is shocked to arrive home to find her on the floor, murdered. As Dalziel and Pascoe narrow down a list of possible suspects, the net tightens around a scam involving long lost relatives of wealthy businessman. And as Wieldy manages to corner the suspect, he decides that it's time for a game of cat and mouse with the detectives. Featuring David Royle as Det Sgt Edgar Wield, David Haig as David Hallingsworth, Donald Sumpter as Gus Mullavey, Nicola Walker as Abbie Hallingsworth, Amita Dhiri as WDC Shaz Kendall, with Kevin Dyer as Leon Pilger, Christine Entwhisle as Fiona Gilks, Richard Coyle as Martin Hallingsworth, Moir Leslie as Monica Clements, David Rubin as Prison Warder, Tim Preece as Neville Staybrass, David Daker as Jack Turton, Stuart Goodwin as Miles Turton, Alex Knight as PC Neilson, and Pippa Haywood as Assistant Chief Constable Rebecca Fenning.
17	"Cunning Old Fox"	Matthew Evans	Stephen Attridge & Malcolm Bradbury	8 July 2000
The death of Georgina Webster, a young business woman who falls from her horse during a fox hunt, turns out to be more than an accident when the leader of the hunt is sent a letter to that effect. Investigating, Dalziel and Pascoe discover someone planted gunpowder in a hedge shortly before her death, causing her horse to be startled and throw her off. As the local SABS group come under investigation, Dalziel discovers that the daughter of the huntsmaster is in fact a saboteur, and may hold more of a grudge than her compadres. But when someone murders huntsman Robert Derringer by feeding him to the hounds, and then tries to blow up huntsmaster James Marsham, Dalziel suspects that whoever the murderer is, he has a grudge against the hunt itself rather than the individual. And when DC Novello finds herself having a one-to-one with the suspect, her undercover guise is threatened. Featuring Jo-Anne Stockham as WDC Shirley Novello, David Calder as James Marsham, Adrian Rawlins as Henry Crayford, Robert Perkins as Robert Darringer, David Royle as Det Sgt Edgar Wield, Chris Barnes as Birdyce, Rick Warden as Midge, Melanie Gutteridge as Susie, Abbie Collins as Georgina Webster, Gerry Hinks as Priest, Sara Markland as Amanda, Stefan Escreet as Pathologist, Kathleen Byron as Daphne, Dinah Handley as Landlady, Louise Rea as Jenny, Tenniel Evans as Pembroke, and Pippa Haywood as Assistant Chief Constable Rebecca Fenning.
18	"Foreign Bodies"	David Wheatley	Malcolm Bradbury	15 July 2000
Dalziel and Pascoe are tasked with investigating four suspicious deaths that occur within hours of each other. The first is the death of a French art dealer, who appeared to have either slipped or was pushed from the side of a motorway bridge. The second is the death of a Russian national whose coffin is found floating in the sea just off the coast of Whitby. The third is the death of a Japanese tourist, who is found stabbed atop a famous beauty spot mentioned in Wuthering Heights. And the fourth is that of a German Stasi, looking for the writings of a German academic whose latest book contains secret information they don't want published. Meanwhile, Dalziel receives a postcard from an old flame, Florrie Stockton, whom he decides to visit in her swanky hotel suite. However, he realises their meeting couldn't come at a better time, when the four dead men all turn out to be her ex-husbands. Featuring Isla Blair as Florence (Florrie) Stockton, James Hazeldine as Professor Barnaby (Barney) Winkler, Robin Soans as Dr Harold Denton, David Royle as Det Sgt Edgar Wield, Jo-Anne Stockham as WDC Shirley Novello, Sheila Kelley as Dr Cookson, Stephen Churchett as DI Larkin, Fred Pearson as Dr Vickery, Valerie Minifie as Erica, Eiji Kusuhara as Mr Kawabata, Clifford Barry as Howarth PC, Andy Mulligan as Maitre D', Wolf Kahler as Jurgen Falke, Paula Jacobs as Landlady, David Fahm as Andy, Sarah Miller as Alix, Sam Hudson-Thomas as Clive Lanning, Adam de Ville as Darren Allbright, Sally Ann Matthews as TV Presenter and Pippa Haywood as Assistant Chief Constable Rebecca Fenning.
19	"Above the Law"	Paul Marcus	Matthew Hall	22 July 2000
When high court judge Jerry Chance is shot dead at point blank range, the immediate suspect is large-scale drugs importer Kenneth Barbour, whom Chance was recently trying for the importation of £15 million worth of street heroin. Barbour swears blind he is not responsible for the killing, so as Dalziel and Pascoe look a little deeper, they discover that Judge Chance was involved in homosexual relationships with young men. And when his latest fling is found dead of a suspected overdose in his flat, they realise that not all of the mystery is quite as it seems. As Mrs. Chance's political connections put her in danger of the same killer, Dalziel discovers an inter-web of blackmail, deceit and lies surrounding Ransom telecoms, with whom Mrs. Chance shares an office, and Mr. Chance's dead lover worked as an analyst. And then a link to Kenneth Barbour's drug money comes to light. Featuring David Royle as Det Sgt Edgar Wield, Jo-Anne Stockham as WDC Shirley Novello, Pippa Haywood as Assistant Chief Constable Rebecca Fenning, Susannah Corbett as Ellie Pascoe, Celia Imrie as Christina Chance, Michael Maloney as David Ransom, David Westhead as Peter Deller, Timothy Carlton as Jerry Chance, Darren Higham as Police Constable, Zubin Varla as John Parker, John Benfield as Kenneth Barbour, Luke Williams as Dr Ashurst, Tim Barker as Albert Smith, Doreene Blackstock as TV Reporter, Kate Fenwick as Cameron Stewart, Gary Parker as Steve Presland and Rosie Millar as Rosie Pascoe.

=== Series 6 (2001) ===
No.	Title	Directed by	Written by	Original release date
20	"Walls of Silence"	Ashley Pearce	Matthew Hall	29 October 2001
Seventeen-year-old music protégé Alec Jordan is found dead floating in a lake, and the incident brings back bad memories for Dalziel, as during a police pursuit ten years ago, he mowed down and killed Alec's mother. Determined to bring justice to Alec's grieving father, Dalziel pulls out all the stops to try and identify the killer – including an impromptu search of Alec's school, which results in his best friend, Sophie Caine, being arrested for possession of cannabis. No closer to the truth surrounding Alec's death, Dalziel is startled when Alec's father requests that he be taken off the case. Determined to continue with his investigation, he takes an in-depth look at a series of Alec's drawings, and manages to discover the identity of the man he was chasing in the pursuit all those years ago. And a shocking revelation about the death of Alec's mother proves to be the final piece in the complex puzzle. Featuring David Royle as Det Sgt Edgar Wield, Jo-Anne Stockham as WDC Shirley Novello, Duncan Preston as Ken Crowley, Paul Brennen as Brian Jordan, Rob Jarvis as Nigel Clifford, Seán Gleeson as Julian Beeson, Sarah Smart as Sophie Caine, Rosie Rowell as Sandra Pallister, Holly Grainger as Nichola Crowley, Marian McLoughlin as ACC Belinda Kennedy, Jonathan Deakin as Alec Jordan, Kate Layden as Mrs Hopkins, James Puddephatt as Dr Paul Ashurst, James Weaver as Kinnaird, Nicholas Camm as Constable, Simon Harvey as Sophie's Solicitor, Debbie Howard as Journalist and Peter Ashdown as Journalist.
21	"Home Truths"	Lawrence Clark	Elizabeth-Anne Wheal	5 November 2001
Dalziel and Pascoe investigate the murder of a young Asian woman, who is shot dead shortly after a heated political debate on the future of a community project for local teenagers. As the pair are forced to interrogate her tight knit community, they receive information from a witness who places one of the opposition's sons down by the river, disposing of a gun shortly after the incident. But when the witness is found dead in similar circumstances, Dalziel suspects that someone is playing him at his own game. Things turn from bad to worse when the initial suspect is lured to a factory owned by the Asian girl's father, shortly before it goes up in flames – taking him with it. As the dirty side of local politics begins to rear its ugly head, Pascoe is tied up with his new relationship with the local pathologist – although his initial fears of an affair prove to be the key turning point of the complex investigation. Featuring David Royle as Det Sgt Edgar Wield, Jo-Anne Stockham as WDC Shirley Novello, Kenneth Cranham as Tommy Collingwood, Madhav Sharma as Bobby Ghataura, Fiona Allen as Det Supt Julie Devon, Guy Rhys as PC Surgit Singh, Darren Morfitt as Matthew Collingwood, Ashley Miller as Dr Sally Shetra, Craig Parkinson as Paul Collingwood, Steve Garti as Sgt John Tate, Ahsen Bhatti as Ravi Ghataura, Thushani Weerasekera as Simran Ghataura, Jill Halfpenny as Tara Connolly, Ravin Ganatra as Journalist 1, Connor Davis-Amard as Journalist 2, Imran Ali as Fiz, Peter Lorenzelli as Richard Bartlett, Howard Coggins as mortuary attendant, Ted Robbins as barman, Darryl Goddard as doctor and Harshna Brahmbhatt as Sita.
22	"Secrets of the Dead"	Ross Devenish	Tom Needham	12 November 2001
Dalziel attends the funeral of Fran Lock, an old friend and associate, with whom he had a close relationship many years ago. However, he is soon distracted by the murder of local solicitor David Brewer, who is found tied to his chair, with his clothes torn and knotted around him. Dalziel opens a letter from Fran implying that Mark is his son – she chose to marry a more reliable man and keep it secret. With Pascoe flying to the States to see his daughter, Dalziel makes Mark acting DI in his absence, much to the delight of Mark's 'father', Ted, who is the local desk sergeant. However, when Fran's name appears in the investigation, Dalziel is forced to give Mark the boot. Meanwhile, Wieldy links Brewer's death with the murder of Paul Sutton, a private detective who was murdered five years ago in similar circumstances. As the pieces start to fit together, Mark confronts the chief suspect in the investigation, only to meet the same fate as Brewer and Sutton. Featuring David Royle as Det Sgt Edgar Wield, Jo-Anne Stockham as WDC Shirley Novello, Henry Goodman as Dr Robert Silwood, John Alderton as Sgt Ted Lock, Ruth Mitchell as Valerie Silwood, Richard Oldham as DS Mark Lock, Connie Hyde as Laura Lock, Francis Maguire as Tom Piper, Helen Sheals as Sarah Piper, Christine Mackie as Gillian Brewer, Christine Cox as Fran Lock, Gary Lilburn as Priest, Raad Rawi as Sumit Jarred, Samantha Billington as Molly Lock, Tom Knight as David Brewer, Karen Meagher as Jane Lester, Ian Kilgannon as Glen, Tamsin Skan as Becky, Caron Pascoe as Nurse and Adam Christopher as PC.
23	"Truth and Consequences"	David Wheatley	Elizabeth-Anne Wheal and David Gilman	19 November 2001
Dalziel and Pascoe investigate the death of an undercover police officer, George Brierly, who was killed during the miners' strikes of 1984, when his remains are discovered at the bottom of a disused mineshaft. As Dalziel revisits his old stomping ground, re-igniting old feuds and long-lost relationships, he decides it's time to pay a visit to his sister, whom he hasn't seen for seven years. Meanwhile, digging into the files, Pascoe discovers that Dalziel was right at the centre of the initial investigation, and somehow managed to escape all of the backlash by taking extended sick leave. As he pushes his boss to discover the real truth, Dalziel is angered at the fact that Pascoe doesn't trust him, and decides to play it alone. As the investigation continues, a second body is found buried at the roadside, and the true motives for the two murders are the pure subject of one villager's suicide note. Featuring Anne Reid as Harriet Clifford, Michael J. Jackson as Tom Bennet, Kate Gartside as Susan Murray, Bruce Byron as Ron Harvey, Ray Stevenson as Jeff Parry, Elizabeth Edmonds as Sheila Harvey, with David Royle as Det Sgt Edgar Wield, Jo-Anne Stockham as WDC Shirley Novello, Ryan Pope as Sean Bennet, Raad Rawi as Sumit Jarred, Zoë Henry as Emma Harvey, Keith Clifford as Stan Parry, John Kay Steel as DCI Chalker, Jacqueline Pilton as woman, Simon Hanna as foreman, David Church as man1, Steven Dykes as man2, Brian Stephens as constable, Andrew Legge as PC, Frank J. Lauder as Ronnie Jackson, Alexander Perkins as foundry man, Joel Morris as Ken, Katie Bancroft as Gilly and Ged Mulherin as Wayne.

=== Series 7 (2002) ===
No.	Title	Directed by	Written by	Original release date
24	"The Unwanted"	Patrick Lau	Manjit Singh	30 September 2002
Martin Wilkie, a soldier with the local army regiment, is found dead in a pig shed on the wedding day of one of his closest colleagues. Pascoe is immediately taken off the case, as the death occurs in his home town, and he had known most of the witnesses – and even the prime suspect – Dalziel is forced to play it by the book. Meanwhile, a hospital appointment has Dalziel running scared, so much he can't even admit to Wieldy that there's something wrong. As the murders continue to rack up, including the bride and groom, and a local immigrant who escaped capture from immigration control, Dalziel uses the clues to work out just who is responsible for the deaths of four people. And Pascoe is forced to choose between his childhood crush and his father, when she turns out to be the killer – and his father the next possible victim. And then, things get worse when Dalziel has a heart attack. Featuring Jim Carter as Ted Lowry, Susan Jameson as Annie Pascoe, Amanda Ryan as Kate Lowry, John McEnery as Bill Pascoe, Kate Fleetwood as Jill Lowry, Ian Peck as Sgt Ian Henslowe, Jonathan Ryland as Terry Pascoe, Monica Dolan as Megan Lowry, with David Royle as Det Sgt Edgar Wield, Keeley Forsyth as DC Carrie Harris, Paul Copley as Jack Henslowe, Rad Lazar as Kemal Sulejvic, Jason Pitt as Cpl Martin Wilkie, Andrew Readman as Geoff Turlough, Natasha Milkovitch as Naida Sulejvic, Nicholas Lane as Immigration Officer, James Puddephatt as Dr Paul Ashurst, Brian Pettifer as Mortimer, Beverley Hills as Viv Kelly, Millie Wilkie as Emina Sulejvic, Penelope Freeman as consultant, Ivana Bašić as Bosnian interpreter, Geoffrey Beevers as Vicar, James Vaughan as Lt Col James Hartley, Craig Shepherd as Fire Chief and Alison Darling as Sharon Wilkie.
25	"Mens Sana"	Juliet May	Stephen Churchett	7 October 2002
73-year-old Mrs. Vannstone is found dead in a seaweed bath at a local spa. With Dalziel on a month's sick leave following his heart attack, it's left to Pascoe to deal with the case. Things look pretty straight forward, until the nurse who found the body supposedly commits suicide. Deciding it is time to return to work, Dalziel books himself a week at the spa in an attempt to find out the real goings on. And when another grisly murder occurs, he realises that certain people claim to be somebody they aren't – and the truth begins to unravel in more than one horrific way for Pascoe, as his latest floozy turns out to the prime suspect. And when all of the events are connected to the death of a man at the spa two years ago, Dalziel is forced to step in and take charge of the situation. Is Pascoe naive enough to let the prime suspect get away just to have a little bit of fun, or will his head rule his heart? Featuring Norman Wisdom as Bernie Marks, Antony Booth as Sir Christopher Wynne, Maxine Peake as Dr Allison Laurie, Sanjeev Bhaskar as Graham Shah, Jeff Rawle as Raymond Miles, Julia Deakin as Chloe Miles, Bryan Dick as Marcus Vanstone, David Royle as Det Sgt Edgar Wield, Keeley Forsyth as DC Carrie Harris, with Karen E Jones as Maggie Hopcraft, Lucy Pargeter as Judy Venables, James Puddephatt as Dr Paul Ashurst, Una Brandon Jones as Harriet Vanstone, Penelope Freeman as consultant, Lorraine Bruce as nurse, Vincent Davies as desk sergeant, Hayley Jayne Standing as waitress, Mushi Noor as Dinesh and Leah-Verity White as young girl.
26	"Sins of the Fathers"	Lawrence Clark	Elizabeth-Anne Wheal	14 October 2002
The paralyzed daughter of local farmers Sue and Jamie Blackstone finds she is able to walk again after being taken to a tree known as 'the healer' in Wetherton woods. However, the joy is short lived when an excavation to determine the tree's integrity yields the remains of a young girl who disappeared more than forty years ago from a children's home. As Dalziel and Pascoe track down the manager of the home, a local church priest – Father Leonard Tibbings – they discover a systematic chain of abuse by Tibbings and the church, which involved splitting up siblings, including identical twins, and making youngsters work for no pay on farmland belonging to the church. As Pascoe attempts to locate the whereabouts of another missing girl, Dalziel is tied up when he bumps into his sister in the nearby village, only to discover that she is dying of cancer – and that he has a brother. Featuring James Bolam as Father Tibbings, Anne Reid as Harriet Clifford, Lindsey Coulson as Sue Blackstone, Roger Lloyd Pack as Bishop Halliwell, Rob Dixon as Jamie Blackstone, John Flitcroft as PC John Shepherd, Bryan Marshall as Terry Brakespeare, Michael Hodgson as Dr Stephen Weston, with David Royle as Det Sgt Edgar Wield, Keeley Forsyth as DC Carrie Harris, Tom Charnock as Dr George Appleton, James Puddephatt as Dr Paul Ashurst, Grace Mitchell as Bea Blackstone, Christopher John Hall as cardiac nurse, Sam Cunningham as Tricia, Nicola Headley as Briony Blackstone, April Cunningham as Emily Weston, James Lauren as forensic officer, Trish Cooke as receptionist and Elliot Spencer-Keyse as Joshua.
27	"For Love Nor Money"	Warren Clarke	Mark Holloway	21 October 2002
Dalziel and Pascoe investigate the death of retired police officer Donald Fitzgerald, who is found bludgeoned to death on a local golf course, in similar circumstances to that of Ted Barnes, a snout who was killed by local rich kid Danny Macer, who was subsequently acquitted of all charges on the same day. Dalziel is determined to prove that his old foe is responsible, but with his deteriorating health, and being knocked down by a hit and run driver, Pascoe is forced to inform the ACC, who takes him off the case and sends him back on sick leave. As a second witness connected with the case is also found dead, and an unsuspecting local is burgled after picking up a vital piece of evidence, Pascoe realises that the trail to leads to junior DC Dean Sheldon, who had been having a secret tryst with Fitzgerald's daughter, Christine, on the night of his death. And then he goes on the rampage with a gun. Featuring Diana Quick as ACC Stella Applegarth, David Royle as Det Sgt Edgar Wield, Keeley Forsyth as DC Carrie Harris, John Duttine as Danny Macer, Ian Curtis as DC Dean Sheldon, Christine Bottomley as Christine Fitzgerald, Ruth Gemmell as Rachel Waller, William Armstrong as Dr Jeff Waller, David Crellin as Bob Barnes, with Pippa Guard as Elizabeth Fitzgerald, James Puddephatt as Dr Paul Ashurst, Josh Moran as Howard Geary, Lorna Anders as journalist, John Melainey as police officer, Richard Cadbury as Det Supt Donald Fitzgerald and Gurbinder Hayer as reporter.
28	"Dialogues of the Dead"	Patrick Lau	Hugh Stoddart	21 December 2002; 22 December 2002
Dalziel and Pascoe investigate a series of bizarre murders, all of which appear to have been committed by the same killer – although appear on the surface to have little or no connection. After each murder, the killer submits a reading to a local short story writing contest, leaving Dalziel and Pascoe with a number of strangely-written letters, which depict each killing in detail. As the death toll continues to rack up, the detective duo discover that each killing is linked to a corresponding letter of the alphabet – and thus the next death must begin with the letter 'G'. As DC Elton "Hat" Bowler becomes entangled with beautiful librarian Rye, Dalziel realises that all of the killings are related to the death of David Lyttleton, an extremely bright university student who was killed in a car crash aged just sixteen. As the team work out the identity of the killer, the race is on to find Bowler alive.

=== Series 8 (2004) ===
The eighth series was broadcast in the United Kingdom as four standard 90-minute episodes, as per series one through seven. However, in Europe, the series was broadcast in a similar format to series nine through eleven, splitting the stories into two 45-minute episodes broadcast on consecutive nights. The air dates used here are the original British dates.

No.	Title	Directed by	Written by	Original release date
29	"A Game of Soldiers"	Patrick Lau	Stan Hey	3 January 2004
Dalziel and Pascoe investigate the murder of American tourist Nancy D'Amato, whose body is found by squaddies out on a training exercise. As her overbearing husband Gus, a homicide detective from Boston, arrives on the scene, Dalziel is forced to try to keep him in the dark whilst discovering who is responsible for Nancy's death. Meanwhile, an old flame of Dalziel's, DS Jenny Etric, is assigned to help out on the case. As Dalziel tries to rekindle old romances, Spike discovers that Jenny has been less than truthful – her ex-husband is Charlie Stubbs who, in fact, turns out to be one of the prime suspects. As the case begins to unravel, Dalziel is also forced to deal with a sergeant who has been accused of bullying members of his regiment – and suspects he may be responsible for the murder of two soldiers. However, a bigger twist arises when the body turns out not to be Nancy's. Featuring David Soul as Gus D'Amato, Phyllis Logan as DS Jenny Ettrick, Charles Lawson as Charles Stubbs, Lee Boardman as Sgt Brian Skinner, Katy Cavanagh as DS Dawn Milligan, with Ian Pirie as Jake Hawkins, Joe Savino as Dr Frank Mason, Tim Murphy as Mark Bell, Debora Weston as Nancy D'Amato, Philip McGinley as Private Frank Ellerby, Andrew Turner as Private Kevin Gillman, James Vaughan as Lt Col James Hartley and Alison Pargeter as barmaid.
30	"The Price of Fame"	David Wheatley	Tony McHale	10 January 2004
Pascoe and Milligan are forced to investigate the suspicious death of a holiday village entertainer after Dalziel is suspended for his conduct during an interview with a kidnapping suspect. Pascoe manages to persuade the ACC to take Dalziel back as the SIO on the case, instead of DCI Derek Hawes, who Pascoe believes is not up to the job. As two bodies are found relating to the first killing, Dalziel realises that an intimate web of a fraudulent agent, perverted manager and a diamond heist worth £2 million are the three key pieces in solving the case. Meanwhile, as he's still stewing over the kidnapping of student Penny Wilson, he manages to persuade the ACC to let him continue with the case on the basis that he manages to achieve a result with 48 hours. As he pieces all of the clues together, Dalziel realises he was looking as the completely wrong suspect, and now suspects a family friend. Featuring Ricky Tomlinson as Rowan Priestley, John McArdle as Matthew Davis, Claire King as Louise Russell, James Corden as Ben Forsythe, Emil Marwa as Brandon Taylor, Mark Heap as Julian Finch, William Ilkley as DCI Derek Hawes, Katy Cavanagh as DS Dawn Milligan, Darren Tunstall as Roy Daynes, Annette Bentley as Lindsey Wilson, Judy Flynn as Karen Clark, Susan Brown as ACC Alex Lawrence, with Joe Savino as Dr Frank Mason, Marcelle Duprey as Kim Slater, Lisa M Kay as Efrona Davis, Anthony Lewis as Gavin Oldham, Sinead Bailey as Penny Wilson and Travis Yates as boy in internet café.
31	"Great Escapes"	Colin Buchanan	Elizabeth-Anne Wheal	17 January 2004
On a stormy night out on the Yorkshire moors, Dalziel's car breaks down on the way back from a charity do, leaving him stranded for the evening. As he finds the comfort of a local B&B, his peace is shattered by the discovery of the body of local barmaid Sally, having been murdered and dumped. Meanwhile, category A prisoner Charlie Walker has managed to escape from police custody, and is determined to prove he wasn't responsible for the murder of his wife, Kate, which he was convicted of – although no body has ever been found. As the pieces begin to fit together of the night of Sally's death, Dalziel uncovers a ring of dirty Yorkshire businessmen tied up in the dangerous world of dogfighting, and the seven-year-old frozen body of Kate turns up at the same crime scene. As the final piece of evidence slowly falls into place, Dalziel heads to a showdown between father and son-in-law. Featuring Tim Healy as Mike Pitman, Lynda Bellingham as Jess Pitman, Richard Ridings as Trevor Nesbitt, Oliver Cotton as Keith Henshaw, Katy Cavanagh as DS Dawn Milligan, Jack Deam as Charlie Walker, with James Puddephatt as Dr James Ashurst, Graham Turner as Frank Fyley, Ian Puleston-Davies as Paul Pitman, Jessica Harper as Nicki Walker, Alison Swann as Tracy Pitman, Helen Latham as Sally Craig, Kathleen Worth as Mrs Stimpson, Kate Deakin as Kerry, Charis Berry as Kate Walker, David Perks as rambler, Jane Hicks as volunteer and Michael Keogh as DC.
32	"Soft Touch"	Paul Marcus	Bill Gallagher	24 January 2004
The autopsy of a Russian national who is found dead face down in a lake reveals that someone tried to murder him two years previously – with an AK-47 bullet which became lodged in his spine. Meanwhile, the owner of local factory firm Matty's Shoes is found bludgeoned to death in his office. Dalziel initially suspects Stevie Earle, a man who suffered severe acid burns during an accident at the factory four years ago, for which he never received any compensation. And then there's the man's youngest son, who appears to have disappeared from the face of the planet, even relinquishing control of his nightclub after racking up a massive debt. As the list of suspects continues to grow, the man's estranged wife makes a confession, saying she was responsible for his murder – but which one of her sons is she protecting? The involvement of a Russian businesswoman only complicates matters. Featuring Alison Steadman as Marion Mattis, James Laurenson as Richard Mattis, Nicholas Gleaves as Sam Mattis, Amy Robbins as Deborah Mattis, Karl Johnson as Stevie Earle, Kieran O'Brien as Chris Mattis, Lidija Zovkic as Natalia Chevlikin, Katy Cavanagh as DS Dawn Milligan, with James Puddephatt as Dr James Ashurst, Lesley Clare O'Neill as Audrey Milligan, Hazel Ellerby as Jacquie Whiting, Chris Rowe as Vince Kilcline, Hannah Storey as Jemma Earle, Harmage Singh Kalirai as Ralph, Andy Rashleigh as Jerry Talbot, Peter McNally as Darrell Sylvian, Neil Boorman as Greg Humphries, and Tremaine Maynard as Tom Milligan.

=== Series 9 (2005) ===
The DVD release of this series contains the internationally broadcast versions of each episode, which remove twenty minutes of footage from each two-hour story, presumably to include adverts where required in international broadcast. In the UK each episode was first broadcast as two one hour parts on consecutive days.

No.	Title	Directed by	Written by	Original release date
33	"Heads You Lose"	Matthew Evans	Tony McHale	30 January 2005; 31 January 2005
When body parts and medical waste are found in Wetherton lake, Dalziel and DC Lateef investigate the disappearance of missing nurse Leanne Proctor, last seen three days ago by her flat mates. Meanwhile, Pascoe is seriously injured whilst pursuing a suspect through an underground maze of tunnels, leaving Dalziel wondering if he will make it through. As the prime suspect for Leanne's murder looks certain to have attacked another nurse, Dalziel wastes no time in setting up a sting by trying to catch him in the act – using staff nurse, and Pascoe's latest conquest, Shannon, as bait. Convinced they have caught their prime suspect, Dalziel and Lateef are distraught to discover CCTV footage, which places him in Oldham at the time of the killing. And when Shannon discovers that a withdrawn drug is still being prescribed to some epileptic patients, the real culprit is revealed. Featuring Haydn Gwynne as Dr McKenzie Mansfield, Kirsty Mitchell as Nurse Shannon Hayes, Paterson Joseph as Mr Alisdair Collinson, Rachael Hayden as Melinda Miller, Robert Powell as Barry Jemmerson, Michael Begley as Carl Watmough, Richard Harrington as Gary Mileham, Miriam Karlin as Judith Bateman, with Wayne Perrey as DC Parvez Lateef, Naomi Bentley as WPC 'Janet' Jackson, Joe Savino as Dr Frank Mason, Inga Brooksey as Amy Mansfield, Catherine Breeze as Jenny Armstrong and Philip Wright as Colin Armstrong.
34	"Dead Meat"	Patrick Lau	Simon Sharkey	6 February 2005; 7 February 2005
When animal activist Robin Challenor is found savaged to death inside the tiger cage at Latimer's Private Zoo, Dalziel suspects someone is responsible for murder, when forensics found at the scene don't match the injuries on Challenor's body. The case holds many memories for Dalziel, as Simon "Tiger" Harper, the lover of the zoo's owner, Guy Latimer, disappeared more than twenty-five years previously after being accused of murdering another local man at a dinner party. As old grievances again rear their ugly head, the death of assistant vet Maria Chan also reveals a sinister business of illegal organ transplants taking place at night, using innocent Chinese immigrants as donors in return for papers which grant them access to stay in the United Kingdom. Meanwhile, Pascoe is forced to come to terms with what he wants from life when ex-wife Ellie and daughter Rosie unexpectedly arrive. Featuring Christopher Cazenove as Guy Latimer, Oliver Dimsdale as Danny Latimer, Sharon Duce as Jenny Challoner, Susannah Corbett as Ellie Pascoe, Wayne Perrey as DC Parvez Lateef, Naomi Bentley as WPC 'Janet' Jackson, Joe Savino as Dr Frank Mason, Peter de Jersey as William Courtney, Teo-Wa Vuong as Maria Chan, David MacCreedy as Saul Axton, James Aubrey as Lord 'Tiger' Harper, Sean Blowers as Ronny Marnham, Stuart Ong as Han, Martin Troakes as Glen Priddy, Anna Lauren as Katie Donovan, Jonny Freeman as Robin Challoner, Lucy Flack as Young Jenny Huddlestone, Alexander Warner as Young Lord Harper, Ben Tillett as Young Latimer, Richard Plumley as Billy Huddlestone, Diana Payan as Mary and Rebecca Bridges as Rosie Pascoe.
35	"The Dig"	David Thacker	Stan Hey	13 February 2005; 14 February 2005
An archaeological dig on the proposed site of a motorway bypass reveals the remains of a six-month-old body buried beneath the surface. While Dalziel sets his eyes firmly on the forensic pathologist investigating the case, Pascoe decides to do a little digging, and uncovers an entangled web involving a crooked councillor, bent surveyor and a highly dangerous team of workmen, who after a spat in the local pub, go crazy and decide to completely destroy the dig site, setting fire to archaeological equipment, attacking the volunteers and using a JCB to crush their vehicle into a pulp. But surveying the carnage the next morning, the body of one of the workmen, Tarzan, is found in his caravan bludgeoned to death. And DNA puts recently released convicted murder Clive Jacobs right at the scene, although he insists he is innocent. Meanwhile, Lateef makes a breakthrough on the unidentified body. Featuring George Irving as Robin Blake / Stuart Mills, Finbar Lynch as Dave Cashman, Susan Lynch as Dr Janet Rix, Juliet Aubrey as Dr Eleanor Brown, Jonathan Linsley as Clive Jacobs, Wayne Perrey as DC Parvez Lateef, Neil Haigh as Paul Hobbs, Steve Jackson as John Hobbs, with Naomi Bentley as WPC 'Janet' Jackson, Wayne Foskett as Lord Lucan / Harry Simms, Stephen Boxer as James Atherton, Clint Dyer as Tarzan / Keith Gibson, Krassimir Damianov as No Nose / Ismail Medmedov, Derren Litten as Mad Dog, Jane Hazlegrove as Kay Simms, Adjoa Andoh as Katie Bevins, Steve Ramsden as Billy Moyes, Susan Engel as Princess, Will Norris as PC Phil Higson, Sally George as Cashman's Solicitor, John Navagam as CPS Lawyer and Tom Manners as TV Reporter.
36	"Dust Thou Art"	Gwennan Sage	J. C. Wilsher	20 February 2005; 21 February 2005
When student Lisa Johnstone is kidnapped in broad daylight, PC Jackson finds herself at the mercy of two local thugs after trying to intervene, ending with herself being kidnapped too. Meanwhile, music teacher Visha Iqbal is found stabbed in a ditch and a letter is sent to his wife explaining the details of his affair with none other than Lisa Johnstone. As Dalziel and Pascoe run through an everlasting list of suspects, an art dealer whom Pascoe assisted after saving her from a hit and run is found murdered at the bottom of a ravine, with her car having been run off the road. And when a third body, that of arts centre manager Emma Collins is pulled from a nearby river, Dalziel quickly deduces that all three killings and Lisa's kidnapping are all related to the local arts centre. As a scam involving forged 17th century old master drawings comes to light, Dalziel races against time to save Jackson. Featuring Douglas Henshall as Tony Watson, Naomi Bentley as WPC 'Janet' Jackson, Siobhan Finneran as Susie Ferdinand, Tessa Peake-Jones as Emma Collins, Anna Calder-Marshall as Anna Wisley, Rupert Procter as Mark Tatton, Julian Wadham as Richard Johnstone, Jane Gurnett as Pam Johnstone, Gary Whitaker as Mark Heathfield, Sam Hazeldine as Sean Doherty, David Burke as Paul Boddison, Victor McGuire as Dave Green, Flora Spencer-Longhurst as Lisa Johnstone, Sophie Osborne as Kirsten Thomas, Wayne Perrey as DC Parvez Lateef and Joe Savino as Dr Frank Mason.

=== Series 10 (2006) ===
The DVD release of this series contains the internationally broadcast versions of each episode, which remove twenty minutes of footage from each two-hour story, presumably to include adverts where required in international broadcast.

No.	Title	Directed by	Written by	Original release date
37	"Houdini's Ghost"	Patrick Lau	Elizabeth-Anne Wheal	6 March 2006; 7 March 2006
Retired entrepreneur Pal McLean is found dead in his study, with his face having been shot to a pulp by a shotgun. With the door having been locked from the inside, and all signs pointing to a suicide, Dalziel believes it's an open and shut case. But McLean's son, Rob, is determined to lay the blame on someone's shoulders, and sets out to find the evidence to convict someone for murder. But then he is found dead in exactly identical circumstances. When the post mortem reveals that he was suffering from an inoperable brain tumour, Dalziel again deduces he took his own life. Photos of McLean's son-in-law Jason playing away with a prostitute soon prove to be the key element in the case, until the private detective who took them is found dead at the bottom of a stairwell, with his head caved in. As Pascoe searches for a motive for murder, Dalziel woos over his one true love, Kay McLean. Featuring Cherie Lunghi as Kay Miclean, John Bowe as Bill Walker, Hannah Yelland as Helen Chapman, Daniel Evans as Rob Miclean, Rocky Marshall as Jason Chapman, Paul Barber as Clive Griffin, Zita Sattar as Louise Hepburn, Earl Cameron as Arthur Nolan, Jennifer James as PC Kim Spicer, Wayne Perrey as DC Parvez Lateef, Angie Garnett as Kelly Knightley, Mark Roper as PC Pat Conway and Joe Savino as Dr Frank Mason.
38	"Glory Days"	Colin Buchanan	Tony McHale	13 March 2006; 14 March 2006
The driver of Wetherton Wanderers F.C.'s tour bus, Ben Hawkins, mysteriously stops the bus in the middle of train tracks, causing the death of three people, including the star manager, Martin Bendilow. However, the post mortem on Bendilow reveals that his death was not caused by the crash – and he was, in fact, suffocated after he was initially injured. As the press attempt to get their hands on any juicy information about Martin, Dalziel investigates which member of the team had a strong enough grievance to want to kill him. When the bus driver is then thrown out of a hotel window to his death, Dalziel suspects that someone is trying to stop any nasty information about Martin leaking out – and when chief journalist Naomi is killed in a hit and run, his theory proves to be more real-life than fiction. As the killer hunts for a DVD of incriminating footage, Dalziel closes the net on his prime suspect.
39	"Wrong Time, Wrong Place"	Warren Clarke	Stan Hey	27 March 2006; 28 March 2006
Dalziel and Pascoe are invited over to Amsterdam for a police conference from Dutch Superintendent De Kuiper, on the morals of people trafficking and prostitution. Dalziel, bored with De Kuiper's mumbo jumbo, decides to pass up on a complimentary after party dinner, and instead decided to head to a local club for a drink. There, he meets a British singer from Yorkshire – Tracy Baxter – and the pair go to see the sights of Amsterdam before going back to her flat for coffee. When Dalziel wakes up the next morning, she is dead beside him in bed, having been slashed across the throat fourteen times. As he quickly becomes Amsterdam's most wanted criminal, Dalziel becomes determined to prove that he is not a killer. But the situation gets worse as the killer strikes again, killing a second girl, and Dalziel becomes witness to the shooting of one of Holland's most notorious diamond smugglers. Featuring Jeroen Krabbé as Det Supt Wim de Kuiper, Johanna ter Steege as Dt Sgt Anna Breukink, Pierre Bokma as DI Hans Boersma, André Arend van de Noord as Hendricks, Michael French as Gary Lescott, Louise Delamere as Tracey Baxter, Peter Wingfield as Dave Simmonds, Ellen ten Damme as Frida Aalst, Wayne Perrey as DC Parvez Lateef, Jennifer James as PC Kim Spicer and Joe Savino as Dr Frank Mason.
40	"Guardian Angel"	Paul Marcus	Glenn Chandler	3 April 2006; 4 April 2006
Housewife Susan Goodman is poisoned to death whilst in the course of doing her weekly shopping. Initially suspected as a terrorist attack, Dalziel and Pascoe soon discover that for some bizarre reason, someone had motive to kill this innocent woman. And events take an even more extraordinary turn when a large sum of money, which her husband Paul lost in a pension scam setup by the Albion bank is left on his doorstep by an unknown caller. Shortly after, a package arrives on the doorstep of another local housewife, and minutes later, she too is dead. Linking the events to the time that Paul and Susan spent at holiday resort Arcadia, and its owner, Brian Fairmile, Dalziel decides to discover why both women withdrew £20,000 from their bank accounts shortly before their stay, and why the money appears to have vanished. And then, to make matters worse, a third woman is murdered. Featuring Christopher Fulford as Terry Parker, Sally Dexter as Pauline Parker, Bruno Langley as Jason Parker, Stephen Tompkinson as Brian Fairmile, Anton Lesser as Paul Goodman, Elaine Donnelly as Susan Goodman, Tony Haygarth as Michael Veitch, Marjorie Yates as Angela Veitch, Hugh Ross as Andrew Caulfield, Eva Pope as Jane Caulfield, Gerard Horan as Jim Webster, Stella Gonet as Christine Webster, Jimmy Yuill as Robert MacAlpine, Kelly Hunter as Laura MacAlpine, Rob Edwards as Ben Edwards, Wayne Perrey as DC Parvez Lateef, Jennifer James as PC Kim Spicer and Rebecca Bridges as Rosie Pascoe
41	"A Death in the Family"	Richard Signy	Nicholas Martin	10 April 2006; 11 April 2006
Security guard Dave Compton is murdered in a high-stakes, high reward transit depot robbery, in which the robbers get away with £600,000. Dalziel and Pascoe are a little shaken by the death, having known Dave from his time in the force as a detective sergeant. Meanwhile, businessman Steve Pitt is slashed to death with a knife in the kitchen of his restaurant. They are many suspects for the killing, including the ex-boyfriend of his current partner, Claire, who is now three months pregnant with Pitt's child. As it transpires that Pitt and his business partner Imam Abdullah, who has disappeared without trace, were responsible for the robbery, Dalziel has to distinguish whether his disappearance and Pitt's murder are actually acts of revenge, or whether the motive is somewhere closer to home. And before she knows it, the net closes in on seemingly innocent friend Rebecca. Featuring Amelia Curtis as Rebecca Stevens, Burn Gorman as Jerry Hart, Steve John Shepherd as Steve Pitt, Claire Price as Clare Higgins, James Thornton as Hugh Shadwell, Sophie Winkleman as Alice Shadwell, Paul Sharma as Imad Abdullah, Art Malik as Aahil Khan, Jennifer James as PC Kim Spicer, Wayne Perrey as DC Parvez Lateef, Simon Nagra as Hashim Kareem, Gillian Wright as Pat Richardson, Charlotte Longfield as Lecturer, Biddy Wells as Roberta James, Shane Zaza as Rayn Khan, Asif Khan as Ehsan Khan, Jennifer Daley as Receptionist, Paul Butterworth as Vicar, Marcus Romer as Ray Marsdon and Karen Henthorn as Claudine Griffin (Pathologist)

=== Series 11 (2006) ===
Series eleven and twelve were filmed back to back between January and May 2006, but the broadcast in the United Kingdom saw the first two stories billed as series eleven and the remaining episodes billed as series twelve. However, all other international broadcasts saw the episodes billed as one series.

No.	Title	Directed by	Written by	Original release date
42	"The Cave Woman"	Minkie Spiro	Dusty Wright	3 September 2006; 4 September 2006
A rescue mission to save several trapped cavers reveals the remains of Lyn Baron, the ex-wife of the current chief constable, who disappeared in 1985 on the way to see her children. The main suspect at the time, Eddy Somers, died months later in a suspected suicide, leaving the case unresolved. Meanwhile, Lyn's daughter, Narissa, is stalked by her nosy neighbour, who is determined to find out everything he can about her. When she goes missing, Dalziel becomes determined to find her before she suffers the same fate. As they track her to a disused flat, they discover that Eddy Somers did not really die in the crash – he is dead in the flat, with a needle full of highly-powered morphine stuck into his arm. As an unsolved hit-and-run from nearly 30 years back reveals itself as the spur for the chain of events, Dalziel has to deal with the grief of DC Lateef's death. Featuring Denis Lawson as John Barron, Reece Dinsdale as Iain Pyke, Christine Tremarco as Nerissa Barron, Joseph Mawle as Charlie Barron, Wayne Perrey as DC Parvez Lateef, Jennifer James as PC Kim Spicer, Sylvia Syms as Maisie Barron, Jane Wood as Vanda Dewhurst, Sue Jenkins as Sophie Barron, with Ralph Ineson as James Maddern, Eunice Huthart as Jenny Mills, Lorraine Bruce as Maggie Ruddlesdin, Brendan Charleson as Eddie Summers, Marc Anwar as Naved Lateef, Sakuntala Ramanee as Sameen Lateef, Bill Thomas as Phil Cooper, Jane Guernier as Susan Decker, Gary Pillai as Magnus Tozier, James Barron as Solicitor, Tom Lorcan as Young John Barron, Sam Curtis as Paul Victor, Rob Collier as Simon Thewlis, Bean Peel as Mandy Phillips and Joe Savino as Dr Frank Mason
43	"Fallen Angel"	Ian Knox	Johanne McAndrew & Elliot Hope	10 September 2006; 11 September 2006
When popular jockey Sammy Hogarth dies from a high dose of warfarin, Dalziel and Pascoe are forced to investigate the dark side of horse racing. In her first case as a DC, Posh is given the task of calling everyone on Sammy's phone – only to uncover the case of missing girl Julie-Anne Henshaw, who disappeared without trace a year ago. Suspecting that the two cases could be linked, Dalziel investigates the course vet Drummond Sachs, suspecting that he may be responsible for a match-fixing scandal, which resulted in big payouts for the syndicate. However, when Sachs is killed in a light aircraft crash carrying a baby on board, Dalziel realises that there is more to the case than first meets the eye. As a horrific tale of rape and destruction unfolds as the motive for Julie-Anne's murder, Dalziel realises that all those dead were connected to that horrific night. Featuring Cheryl Campbell as Jean Swainbank, Emily Joyce as Natalie Lawson, Sean Wilson as Ken Lawson, Andrew Tiernan as Jake McNally, Rachel Davies as Sandra McNally, Craig Kelly as Eddie Wilcox, Jennifer James as DC Kim 'Posh' Spicer, Mary Jo Randle as Moira Henshaw, Jodie Whittaker as Kirsty Richards, Steve Chaplin as Ben Culton / Jamie Henshaw, with Simon Trinder as Todd Fletcher, Niall Buggy as Drummond Sachs, Jemma Hines as PC Baines, Deka Walmsley as Kevin Hogarth, Marc Pickering as Sammy Hogarth, and James Puddephatt as Dr James Ashurst

=== Series 12 (2007) ===
No.	Title	Directed by	Written by	Original release date
44	"Demons on Our Shoulders"	Patrick Lau	Paul Billing	6 May 2007; 7 May 2007
Innocent housewife Jean Hamilton is blasted to death with a shotgun in her bedroom on Halloween, her husband, Guy is quickly identified as the prime suspect. However, it is not the first time she has been killed by her husband – they played out her death on a television magic show just a year before. Suspecting that the magician, Lee Knight, may have hypnotised Guy into murdering his wife, Dalziel starts scrutinising every aspect of Knight's work, whilst the search for missing Guy gets underway. Meanwhile, the night after a long ritualistic ceremony at a nearby castle, the remains of Jean's daughter Katherine are discovered, with the entire left side of her body missing. As Dalziel and Pascoe delve deep into the world of witches and witchcraft, Dalziel has a midnight premonition, which leads him right to the location of Guy's body – only to find the entire right side of his body missing. Featuring Richard E Grant as Lee Knight, Nancy Carroll as Samantha Mantell, Emily Bruni as Tamzin Court, Margo Gunn as Sarah Johnson, Peter Wight as Charles Johnson, Robyn Addison as Katherine Hamilton, Paul Hilton as Oliver Taylor, Niall MacGregor as David Sargent, David Bell as James Hamilton, Gerard Murphy as Steven Burlow, and Denise Black as Peta Sinclair, with Jennifer James as PC Kim Spicer, Ben Owen Jones as Edward Nash, Richard O'Callaghan as Aiden Scarman, Jemma Hines as PC Baines, James Vaughan as Guy Hamilton, Priyanga Burford as Rebekah Beeton, and Sarah Patel as Meeta Thalani.
45	"Project Aphrodite"	David Tucker	Edel Brosnan	14 June 2007; 15 June 2007
Researcher Declan Roach is found dead at the local university, having been poisoned with liquid nitrogen in the laboratory clean room. A student of highly respected professor Fran Cunningham, the motive for his death appears to stem from his involvement with Science Saves, an activist group who campaigned for the continued use of animals in clinical scientific experiments. With his parents having also been targeted, Dalziel suspects that the killer is someone who is against the campaign, and is trying to prevent Declan from continuing with it. However, events take a sinister twist when Fran Cunningham is pushed from an eighth floor balcony to her death in the university common room. Getting an old flame of his to analyse Fran's research, Pascoe discovers she is a fraud, and suspects that someone else may have found out what she was up to. Who is responsible? Featuring Chipo Chung as Layla Jadwin, Amelia Bullmore as Frances Cunningham, Anthony Calf as Joe Furst, Kevin Doyle as Adam Bolt, Jamie Harding as Sam Wiseman, Branwell Donaghey as Matt Hurley, John Lightbody as Ben Sharp, Barbara Marten as Louise Roach, Angela Clerkin as Liz Reid / Helen Hobbs, Tracie Bennett as Grace Beck, Jennifer James as DC Kim 'Posh' Spicer, Michelle Dockery as Aimee Hobbs, Richard O'Callaghan as Aidan Scarman, Jack Ryan as Declan Roach, and Dean Williamson as Kieran Roach
46	"Under Dark Stars"	Alan Grint	Paul Billing	21 June 2007; 22 June 2007
In their final case, Dalziel and Pascoe are faced with the grief of two families whose sons were murdered by convicted child sex offender Michael Wheeler, only for him to be acquitted and walk free from court. Meanwhile, a cabbie is suspiciously struck down and killed, and his body dumped in a nearby woods. As the investigation into his death gets underway, the body of a young South-African backpacker is pulled from a nearby river, having been killed in similar circumstances. Realising they have a serial killer on their hands, Dalziel decides an appearance on a national crime programme may draw the killer out. Meanwhile, Pascoe receives a phone call from the father of one of the two dead boys. Arriving at his garage, Pascoe finds that the man has Wheeler tied up and gagged. As Pascoe begs him to let Wheeler free, the man stabs Wheeler to death, leaving Pascoe to cover up the murder. Featuring Derek Riddell as Mark Croft, Sebastian Harcombe as Michael Wheeler, Jessica Bell as Perdy, Reece Noi as Dean Bennett, Moya Brady as Karen Bennett, Michael Brophy as Martin Pearce, Kelli Hollis as Bridget Croft, Jennifer James as DC Kim 'Posh' Spicer, Jemma Hines as PC Baines, Joe Savino as Dr Frank Mason, Chloe Read as Nan Seton, Oliver Jackson as Kevin Jennings, Sue Kelly as Lynne Pearce, Clive Carter as Peter Mayhew, Fergus O'Donnell as Adam Norton, Peter McNeil O'Connor as Fred, Richard Sutton as Greg Hines, Laura Lonsdale as Jane kimber, Bridgitta Roy as Dr Priya Santham and Carol Robb as June Aubrey
