= Traitor's Blood =

First edition (publ. Collins)

Traitor's Blood is a novel by Reginald Hill, the author best known for his Dalziel and Pascoe series of crime novels.

The novel, originally published in the UK in 1983, moves between Venezuela, England and Moscow and involves a disgraced peer, Lemuel Stanhope-Swift, sixth Viscount Bessacarr, and his attempt to return home to die.

== Publication history ==
- 1983, London
- 1986, Woodstock VT: Foul Play ISBN 0-88150-076-3
- 2009, New York: Felony & Mayhem Press ISBN 1-934609-18-8
