= A Pinch of Snuff (TV series) =

- Genre: Crime drama
- Created by: Reginald Hill
- Written by: Robin Chapman
- Directed by: Sandy Johnson
- Starring: Gareth Hale; Norman Pace; Christopher Fairbank; Freddie Jones; John McGlynn; Malcolm Storry; John Woodvine
- Composer: John E. Keane
- Country of origin: United Kingdom
- Original language: English
- No. of series: 1
- No. of episodes: 3

Production
- Executive producer: Keith Richardson
- Producer: Emma Hayter
- Cinematography: Sean Van Hales
- Editor: Janey Walklin
- Running time: 50 minutes
- Production company: Yorkshire Television

Original release
- Network: ITV
- Release: 9 April – 23 April 1994

A Pinch of Snuff is a British television crime drama, consisting of three fifty-minute episodes, that broadcast on ITV network from 9 to 23 April 1994. The series, adapted from the 1978 novel of the same name by author Reginald Hill, was the first Dalziel and Pascoe adaptation for TV, arriving two years before the more widely known BBC adaptation that followed in 1996. In this miniseries, the characters of Dalziel and Pascoe were played by comedians Gareth Hale and Norman Pace, with Christopher Fairbank as loyal sidekick Edgar Wield, and Malcolm Storry as Insp. Ray Crabtree.

== Reception ==
The series broadcast over three consecutive Saturday nights, from 9 April 1994. Reginald Hill was said to have been unhappy with the series, and so prevented ITV from creating any further adaptations for television. The Independent went on to describe the "critical contempt heaped on the first television version" of the legendary characters. It described how "a complex story of pornography and murder was turned into a vehicle for the dramatic talents of Hale and Pace, by common consent breathtakingly miscast as the chalk-and-cheese Yorkshire coppers. While either of them might conceivably have scraped by as the blunt, earthy Dalziel, it's hard to see how anybody could have imagined one of them playing the sensitive, intellectual Pascoe".

BBC Worldwide subsequently approached Hill with a view to creating a new TV adaptation, to which Hill agreed. Actors Warren Clarke and Colin Buchanan were subsequently cast in the roles of Dalziel and Pascoe, and between 16 March 1996 and 22 June 2007, eleven series consisting of both novel adaptations and original stories were produced.

== Cast ==
- Gareth Hale as Inspector Andy Dalziel
- Norman Pace as Sgt Peter Pascoe
- Christopher Fairbank as DS Edgar Wield
- Freddie Jones as Dr Gilbert Haggard
- John McGlynn as Jack Shorter
- Malcolm Storry as Inspector Ray Crabtree
- Ursula Howells as Alice Andover
- Elizabeth Spriggs as Annabelle Andover
- John Woodvine as Godfrey Blengdale
- Linda Marlowe as Gwen Blengdale
- Paul Copley as Charlie Heppelwhite
- John Simm as Clint Heppelwhite

== Episodes ==
No.	Title	Directed by	Written by	Original release date
1	"Episode 1"	Sandy Johnson	Robert Chapman	9 April 1994
2	"Episode 2"	Sandy Johnson	Robert Chapman	16 April 1994
3	"Episode 3"	Sandy Johnson	Robert Chapman	23 April 1994
