= A Pinch of Snuff =

A Pinch of Snuff may refer to:

- A Pinch of Snuff (novel), 1978, by Reginald Hill
- A Pinch of Snuff (TV series), a 1994 British television miniseries, based on the novel
