= A Pinch of Snuff (novel) =

1978 novel by Reginald Hill

- sumit kumar
- Author: Reginald Hill
- Language: English
- Series: Dalziel and Pascoe series, #5
- Genre: crime novel
- Publisher: Collins Crime Club
- Publication date: February 1978
- Publication place: United Kingdom
- Media type: Print (Hardcover)
- Pages: 264p.
- ISBN: 0-00-231643-9
- OCLC: 4482825
- Dewey Decimal: 823/.9/14
- LC Class: PZ4.H64856 Pi PR6058.I448
- Preceded by: An April Shroud
- Followed by: A Killing Kindness

A Pinch of Snuff is a 1978 crime novel by Reginald Hill, the fifth novel in the Dalziel and Pascoe series.

== Plot summary ==
Receiving a tip from his dentist Jack Shorter, Inspector Peter Pascoe takes a closer look at the Calliope Kinema Club, a film club notorious for showing adult entertainment movies. Shorter is convinced that one particular scene in a movie he recently saw was too realistic to have been staged with fake blood, but when Pascoe starts investigating, he soon comes across the actress in question, Linda Abbott, who obviously didn't suffer from any harm and assures Pascoe that his and Shorter's concerns are unnecessary. Meanwhile, the "Calli" has been vandalised and its proprietor Gilbert Haggard has been assaulted so badly that he succumbs to a heart attack. The only existing copy of "Droit de Seigneur" - the film Jack Shorter was so worried about - has been destroyed, and when 13-year-old Sandra Burkill accuses the dentist of being the father of her (yet unborn) child, it begins to look as though Shorter had merely tried to avert suspicions by his claims against the "Calli".

== Publication history ==
- February 1978, London: Collins Crime Club ISBN 0-00-231643-9, hardback

== Television adaptation ==
The novel was adapted for television in 1994, starring Gareth Hale as Dalziel and Norman Pace as Pascoe. It was shown on the ITV network in three parts over consecutive Saturdays, beginning on 9 April. However, Reginald Hill is said to have been unhappy with the series, and the series remains the only Hill adaptation to star Hale and Pace in the leading roles. The Dalziel and Pascoe novels were later picked up by the BBC, where they enjoyed greater success. Between 1996 and 2007, 11 series of Dalziel and Pascoe starring Warren Clarke and Colin Buchanan were made.
