= One Small Step (novella) =

1990 novella by Reginald Hill

- First edition cover
- Author: Reginald Hill
- Language: English
- Series: Dalziel and Pascoe series #12
- Genre: Crime novella
- Publisher: Collins Crime Club
- Publication date: 1 September 1990
- Publication place: United Kingdom
- Media type: Print (Hardcover)
- Pages: 109 pp.
- ISBN: 0002322927
- OCLC: 21520047
- Preceded by: Bones and Silence
- Followed by: Recalled to Life

One Small Step is a 1990 novella written by British writer Reginald Hill featuring the detective characters Dalziel and Pascoe. It is set in 2010, many years after the other Dalziel and Pascoe stories, and involves the detectives investigating the first murder on the Moon.

One Small Step was originally published separately in 1990. In 1996, it was included, along with three other Dalziel and Pascoe stories, in the collection Asking for the Moon.

== Summary ==
In May 2010, Emile Lemarque, a French astronaut, is killed by a short circuit in his urine collection device at the moment he steps onto the surface of the Moon. Retired Detective Superintendent Andy Dalziel and his former colleague Peter Pascoe, now the UK Commissioner in the Eurofed Department of Justice, fly to the Moon to investigate Lemarque's death as a murder.

== Reception ==
Reviewing the American edition of Asking for the Moon in 1996, Publishers Weekly called One Small Step "an almost absurd swansong for the mismatched twosome". Reviewing Asking for the Moon for Booklist, Emily Melton called One Small Step "an intriguing but somewhat hokey piece of futuristic folderol". Crime novelist and critic Martin Edwards described One Small Step as "a slight disappointment".

== Publication history ==
- One Small Step, 1990, London: Collins Crime Club ISBN 0002322927, Pub date 1 September 1990, Hardback
- Asking for the Moon, 1996, London: HarperCollins ISBN 0002325128, Pub date 19 September 1996, Hardback
- Asking for the Moon, 1996, New York, London: Foul Play Press (W. W. Norton & Company) ISBN 0-88150-382-7, Pub date 1 November 1996, Hardback
- Asking for the Moon, 1998, New York: Dell Publishing ISBN 0440225833, Pub date 6 April 1998, Paperback

== See also ==
- "One small step", title namesake, 1969 quote by Neil Armstrong
