= Nina Singh (actress) =

British actress (born 1996)

- Education: East 15 Acting School (BA)
- Occupation: Actor
- Years active: 2019–present

Nina Singh is a British actress. She is best known for her roles in the BBC crime drama Virdee and the Acorn TV mystery series Art Detectives.

== Life and career ==
In 2021 Singh graduated with a Bachelor of Arts from the East 15 Acting School, where she made her first stage appearances.

In 2022 Singh made her television debut in the science fiction thriller series The Lazarus Project, where she played the role of Tash for two episodes. She followed this with supporting and minor roles in The Ex-Wife, The Chemistry of Death, Beyond Paradise, The Unlikely Pilgrimage of Harold Fry (her feature film debut) and Waterloo Road.

In 2025 she landed her first series regular television role in the BBC One crime thriller Virdee, based on the novels by A A Dhand. She played Tara Virdee, an investigative journalist and the title character's niece. That same year, she starred in the Acorn TV detective series Art Detectives, in which she took the role of Detective Constable Shazia Malik, an young police officer who joins the Heritage Crime Unit, a one-man department which deals with crimes related to art and antiques.

In February 2026 it was announced that Singh would co-star alongside Kerry Godliman in the ITV/BritBox reboot of Reginald Hill's Dalziel and Pascoe novels and the prior BBC series. Singh will play DS Paige Pascoe, a gender-swapped version of DI Peter Pascoe from the books and series.

== Filmography ==
=== Film ===
Year	Title	Role	Notes	Ref.
2022	Own Home	Em	Short film	
2023	The Ride	Panchi	Short film	
2023	The Unlikely Pilgrimage of Harold Fry	Garage Girl	Feature film debut	
2023	Girls will be Girls	Charlotte	Short film	
2023	Rough Sleeping	Social Worker	Short film	
2023	Idiomatic	Jessica	Short film	
2023	That Door	Imara 'Mars' Kapoor	Short film	
2025	Dali	Samara	Feature film	

=== Television ===
Year	Title	Role	Notes	Ref.
2022	The Lazarus Project	Tash	2 episodes	
2022	The Ex-Wife	Lola	Series 1, Episode 3	
2023	The Chemistry of Death	Mary Fraser	3 episodes	
2023	Beyond Paradise	Sarah Dodds	Series 1, Episode 1	
2023	Waterloo Road	Parveen	Series 13, Episode 5	
2025	Virdee	Tara Virdee-Duggal	Main role; 6 episodes	
2025	Art Detectives	DC Shazia Malik	Main role; 6 episodes	
2026	Silent Witness	DC Joss King	Upcoming	
TBA	Dalziel & Pascoe	DS Paige Pascoe	Filming	

=== Stage ===
Year	Title	Role	Notes	Ref.
2019	August: Osage County	Johnna	East 15 Acting School	
2020	The Cherry Orchard	Varya	East 15 Acting School	
2020	Antony and Cleopatra	Cleopatra	East 15 Acting School	
2020	Macbeth	First Witch	East 15 Acting School	
2021	The Suicide	Ava & Mandy	East 15 Acting School	
2021	Alaska	Mamta	East 15 Acting School	
2021	Andromeda	Andromeda	Camden People's Theatre	
2022	How to Avoid a Wedding	Aisha		
2023	For One More Day to Live	Louisa	Theatre Peckhem	
2025	The Beautiful Future is Coming	Clare	Bristol Old Vic	
