= Reg Hill (footballer) =

English footballer

Personal information
- Full name: Reginald Hill
- Date of birth: 6 May 1907
- Place of birth: Gibraltar
- Date of death: 1961 (aged 53–54)
- Place of death: Carlisle, England
- Height: 5 ft 11 1/2 in (1.82 m)
- Positions: Centre half; wing half

Senior career*
Years	Team	Apps	(Gls)
1930–193?	Carlisle United	5	(0)
- Lancaster Town
1932–1933	Tranmere Rovers	1	(0)
1933–1937	Hartlepools United	139	(6)
1937	Darlington	12	(0)
1937–193?	Wellington Town		
- * Club domestic league appearances and goals

Reginald Hill (6 May 1907 – 1961) was an English footballer who played as a centre half or wing half in the Football League for Carlisle United, Tranmere Rovers, Hartlepool United and Darlington, and in non-league football for Lancaster Town and Wellington Town.

== Life and career ==
Hill was the second child of Charles James Hill, a sergeant in the 1st Battalion the Border Regiment, and his wife Jessie Jane née Bell. The family accompanied Sgt Hill on his postings: the oldest child, Stella, was born in her mother's native Cumberland, Hill himself was born in Gibraltar and his younger sister Doris in India. The 1911 Census records the family quartered in Sale Barracks, Rangoon, Burma.

Hill played junior football in the Carlisle area, and represented Bedfordshire at county level during a three-year stint as a carpenter serving in the Royal Air Force. He returned to his native north-west where he turned professional with Carlisle United, and made his debut for the club in the Football League in the 1930–31 season. He made just five league appearances for Carlisle, and after a spell in non-league football with Lancaster Town, he had a trial with Tranmere Rovers in late 1932. In his only first-team appearance for that club, on 31 December, he played well against Hartlepools United, and although Tranmere opted against signing him, their opponents did offer him a contract.

In 1933, Hill was selected for the Rest of the County XI to face Sunderland in May 1933 in a match celebrating the golden jubilee of the Durham County Football Association. He remained with Hartlepools for just over four years, during which time he made 157 senior appearances. He played at centre half and in both wing half positions, and scored six senior goals. In February 1937, he was transferred to Darlington. The local paper, the Northern Daily Mail, described him as "one of the most popular players that has ever worn a 'Pools' jersey", and suggested that "those supporters who know Hill as a man as well as a footballer are bound to feel some regret at the departure of a player of the very best type." He finished the season as Darlington's first-choice right half, but was not retained, and moved on to Birmingham & District League club Wellington Town.

By the time of the 1939 Register, Hill was living in his mother's home in Carlisle, married to Isabel, and occupied as a storeman with the Air Ministry. He died in 1961, aged 54, in Carlisle.

He was the father of crime writer Reginald Hill, author of the Dalziel and Pascoe detective novels.
