= Good Morning, Midnight =

Good Morning, Midnight may refer to:

- Good Morning, Midnight (Rhys novel), a 1939 novel by Jean Rhys
- Good Morning, Midnight (Hill novel), a 2004 novel by Reginald Hill
- Good Morning, Midnight (Brooks-Dalton novel), a 2016 novel by Lily Brooks-Dalton; 2020 film adaptation as The Midnight Sky
- "Good Morning—Midnight", a poem by Emily Dickinson
- "Good Morning Midnight (Interlude)" a song by Janelle Monáe from the album The Electric Lady
