= A Clubbable Woman =

1970 novel by Reginald Hill

- First edition cover
- Author: Reginald Hill
- Language: English
- Series: Dalziel and Pascoe series, #1
- Genre: crime novel
- Publisher: Collins Crime Club
- Publication date: 28 September 1970
- Publication place: United Kingdom
- Media type: Print (Hardcover)
- Pages: 256p.
- ISBN: 0-00-231120-8
- Followed by: An Advancement of Learning

A Clubbable Woman is a 1970 crime novel by Reginald Hill, the first novel in the Dalziel and Pascoe series.

It was dramatised as the first episode of the TV series Dalziel and Pascoe.

== Publication history ==
- 1970, London: Collins Crime Club ISBN 0-00-231120-8, Pub date 28 September 1970, Hardback
- 2007, New York: Felony & Mayhem Press ISBN 978-1-933397-93-1, Pub date September 2007
