= Who Guards a Prince? =

1982 novel by Reginald Hill

- First edition (publ. Collins)
- Author: Reginald Hill
- Genre: Mystery
- Publisher: William Collins, Sons
- Publication date: 1982
- Media type: Print
- ISBN: 9780394520773
- Dewey Decimal: 823.914
- LC Class: PR6058.I448

Who Guards a Prince? is a 1982 novel by Reginald Hill, the author best known for his Dalziel and Pascoe series of crime novels.

The plot of this suspense novel revolves around central character, Doug McHarg, and involves an international conspiracy of Freemasons, Scotland Yard, and extends as far as the White House and the British throne.

The book has been published both as Who Guards a Prince? and Who Guards the Prince?.

== Publication history ==
- 1982, London: Collins ISBN 0-00-222612-X
- 1983, New York: Random House ISBN 0-394-71337-0
- 2005, New York: Felony & Mayhem Press ISBN 978-1-933397-02-3
