= Joy Brook =

English actress (born 1969)

- Born: Joy Beadle; 9 May 1969 (age 56); Scarborough, England
- Occupation: Actress

Joy Brook (born Joy Beadle, 9 May 1969) is an English actress who played Detective Constable Kerry Holmes in The Bill and Joanne Pearson in Peak Practice. She has also appeared in The Thin Blue Line, Dalziel and Pascoe episode "Under World", Dream Team and Doctors.

She has been in the short Maltesers sponsor films that accompany Loose Women on ITV. She was in the short Go Compare adverts on TV, and appeared as Dr Melville in Emmerdale on 12 January 2018.

== Personal life ==
In January 1999, she revealed that she was bisexual and had been sexually involved with women since she was 21. At the time her Bill character was having a lesbian fling while working undercover in a prison. "My mother told the whole town I was a lesbian and she was proud of me. My girlfriend was accepted as part of the family." The relationship lasted two years. A four-year relationship with Roger May (b. 1966) ended around the same time that Joy revealed her bisexuality.

She is the great-niece of Tottenham Hotspur manager Bill Nicholson.
