= Ruling Passion =

1973 novel by Reginald Hill

- First edition
- Author: Reginald Hill
- Language: English
- Series: Dalziel and Pascoe series, #3
- Genre: crime novel
- Publisher: Collins Crime Club
- Publication date: April 1973
- Publication place: United Kingdom
- Media type: Print (Hardcover)
- Pages: 255p.
- ISBN: 0-00-231710-9
- OCLC: 746618
- Dewey Decimal: 823/.9/14
- LC Class: PZ4.H64856 Ru PR6058.I448
- Preceded by: An Advancement of Learning
- Followed by: An April Shroud

Ruling Passion is a 1973 crime novel by Reginald Hill, the third novel in the Dalziel and Pascoe series. The novel opens with Detective Peter Pascoe arriving at what should have been a reunion of old friends. Instead he walks in on the scene of a grisly triple-murder. To solve the crime, Pascoe needs both his superior officer, Andy Dalziel and his romantic partner—and Dalziel's feminist antagonist—Elli.

== Publication history ==
- 1973, London: Collins Crime Club ISBN 0-00-231710-9, Pub date April 1973, Hardback
- 1987, London: Harper Collins ISBN 0-586-07260-8
- 2008, New York: Felony & Mayhem Press ISBN 978-1-934609-17-0, Pub date September 2008.
