= Art Detectives (TV series) =

British television series

- Genre: Crime drama
- Screenplay by: Dan Gaster; Will Ing; Paul Powell; Emma Goodwin; Kitty Percy
- Directed by: Declan Recks; Jennie Paddon
- Starring: Nina Singh; Stephen Moyer; Sarah Alexander; Larry Lamb
- Theme music composer: Eoin O'Callaghan
- Composer: Eoin O'Callaghan
- Country of origin: United Kingdom
- Original language: English
- No. of series: 1
- No. of episodes: 6

Production
- Executive producers: Dan Gaster; Will Ing; Paul Powell; Stephen Moyer; Catherine Mackin; Bea Tammer; Daniel March; Klaus Zimmerman
- Producer: Candida Julian-Jones
- Running time: 45–46 minutes
- Production companies: Black Dog Television; Acorn Media Enterprises; Dynamic Television

Original release
- Network: Acorn TV (USA); U&Drama (UK)
- Release: 9 June 2025 – present

Art Detectives is a 2025 British crime drama television series. It stars Nina Singh, Stephen Moyer, Sarah Alexander and Larry Lamb. It premiered on Acorn TV in the United States on 9 June 2025. It premiered in the United Kingdom on U&Drama on 30 October 2025.

A two-part special will air in December 2026, followed by the full second series in 2027.

== Premise ==
Detectives in the Heritage Crime Unit investigate crimes connected to art and antiques, including a potential fake Vermeer, Viking gold, 1934 French wine, and items rescued from the Titanic.

== Cast ==
- Nina Singh as DC Shazia Malik
- Stephen Moyer as DI Mick Palmer
- Sarah Alexander as Rosa Conaghan
- Larry Lamb as Ron Palmer

== Episodes ==
No.	Title	Directed by	Written by	Original release date
1	"Pictures At An Exhibition"	Jennie Paddon and Declan Recks	Dan Gaster, Will Ing, Paul Powell	June 9, 2025
2	"Dead & Buried"	Jennie Paddon	Dan Gaster & Paul Powell	June 9, 2025
3	"Warped"	Jennie Paddon	Emma Goodwin	June 16, 2025
4	"Noble Rot"	Jennie Paddon	Kitty Percy	June 23, 2025
5	"Ice Cold"	Declan Recks	Dan Gaster & Paul Powell	June 30, 2025
6	"Final Bid"	Jennie Paddon	Dan Gaster, Will Ing, Paul Powell	July 7, 2025

== Production ==
The six-part series is written by Dan Gaster, Will Ing, Paul Powell, Emma Goodwin and Kitty Percy. Declan Recks and Jennie Paddon are series directors. Gaster, Ing and Paul Powell are also executive producers for Black Dog Television, with Catherine Mackin and Bea Tammer produce for Acorn TV/Acorn Media Enterprises, and Daniel March and Klaus Zimmerman for Dynamic Television. Candida Julian-Jones is series producer. Support also came from Northern Ireland Screen.

The cast is led by Nina Singh and Stephen Moyer, and also includes Larry Lamb and Sarah Alexander.

Filming took place in Belfast, Northern Ireland, in October and November 2024.

== Broadcast ==
The series premiered on Acorn TV on 9 June 2025, becoming the most-watched new series premiere for the platform.

== Reception ==
On the review aggregator website Rotten Tomatoes, Art Detectives holds an approval rating of 86%.

Margaret Lyons for The New York Times describes the series as a "strong cozy-nerdy procedural".
