= An April Shroud =

1975 novel by Reginald Hill

- First edition
- Author: Reginald Hill
- Language: English
- Series: Dalziel and Pascoe series, #4
- Genre: crime novel
- Publisher: Collins Crime Club
- Publication date: 7 July 1975
- Publication place: United Kingdom
- Media type: Print (Hardcover)
- Pages: 256p.
- ISBN: 0-00-231842-3
- OCLC: 3222728
- Dewey Decimal: 823/.9/14
- LC Class: PZ4.H64856 Ap PR6058.I448
- Preceded by: Ruling Passion
- Followed by: A Pinch of Snuff

An April Shroud is a 1975 crime novel written by Reginald Hill, it is also the fourth novel in the Dalziel and Pascoe series.

The novel is mainly about Dalziel, as Peter and Ellie Pascoe marry and go on honeymoon. Taking leave himself, Dalziel stumbles across a case of embezzlement and murder, which he solves with Pascoe's last minute assistance in the closing chapters.

== Publication history ==
- 1975, London: Collins Crime Club ISBN 0-00-231842-3, Pub date 7 July 1975, Hardback
- 2009, New York: Felony & Mayhem Press ISBN 978-1-934609-32-3, Pub date May 2009.
