= Pictures of Perfection =

1994 crime novel by Reginald Hill

- First edition
- Author: Reginald Hill
- Language: English
- Series: Dalziel and Pascoe series, #14
- Genre: Detective fiction
- Published: 1994 HarperCollins
- Publication place: United Kingdom
- Media type: Print (Hardback)
- ISBN: 0007313144
- Preceded by: Recalled to Life
- Followed by: The Wood Beyond

Pictures of Perfection is a 1994 crime novel by Reginald Hill, and part of the Dalziel and Pascoe series. The title is a quote from a letter by Jane Austen—"Pictures of perfection, as you know, make me sick and wicked." A quote from Austen's letters is included at the beginning of each chapter, and the story itself makes innumerable references to Austen's novels.

== Plot summary ==
The plot involves a missing constable in the Yorkshire village of Enscombe (which is the name of the estate where Frank Churchill lives in the Austen novel Emma). While investigating the issue, the detectives Peter Pascoe and Edgar Wield become acquainted with the inhabitants of the town, and it becomes clear that there are a great many secrets that are being kept. Most of the characters featured in the novel bear a strong resemblance to a character from one of the novels of Jane Austen.

== Reception ==
Pictures of Perfection was a finalist for the 1995 Anthony Award for Best Novel.
