= Carlo Fantom =

Croat mercenary in the English Civil War (died 1643)

- Died: December 1643
- Military career
- Allegiance: Parliamentarians Royalists
- Conflicts: English Civil War

Carlo Fantom (died December 1643) was a "remarkable" Croat mercenary in the English Civil War who had the reputation of being impervious to bullets and is quoted as saying "I care not for your Cause; I come to fight for your halfe-crown and your handsome women. My father was a Roman Catholique, and so was my grandfather. I have fought for the Christians against the Turkes, and for the Turkes against the Christians."

== Career ==
Initially serving in Arthur Goodwin's regiment of horse, where he was valued by the Earl of Essex for training cavalrymen how to fight on horseback. According to an anecdote recorded in John Aubrey's Brief Lives, he was shot at close range by Colonel Robert Pye but remained unscathed, returning the bullets to the colonel with the words "Here, take you bullets again", and later explaining to a friend that his body could not be pierced by bullets due to a herbal treatment received as a child. In 1643 he changed sides to fight for the King. He was reportedly hanged at Bedford for raping a woman, while the army was marching to relieve Gainsborough.

== Legacy ==
The sparse details of his life inspired Reginald Hill's Captain Fantom: Being an account of the Sundry Adventures in the life of Carlo Fantom, Soldier of Misfortune, Hard-man and Ravisher (London, 1978), published under the pen-name Charles Underhill, and the prequel The Forging of Fantom (1979).

He is a primary antagonist in the Fiskardo's War series of historical fiction books by J.C. Harvey.
