= An Advancement of Learning =

1971 novel by Reginald Hill

- First edition cover
- Author: Reginald Hill
- Language: English
- Series: Dalziel and Pascoe series, #2
- Genre: crime novel
- Publisher: Collins Crime Club
- Publication date: 1971
- Publication place: United Kingdom
- Media type: Print (Hardcover)
- Pages: 254p.
- ISBN: 0-00-231009-0
- OCLC: 16194286
- Preceded by: A Clubbable Woman
- Followed by: Ruling Passion

An Advancement of Learning is a 1971 crime novel by Reginald Hill, the second novel in the Dalziel and Pascoe series.

In this novel, the detectives investigate a murder at the fictional Holm Coultram College. More bodies are found after their arrival on campus. In this novel, Pascoe's future wife joins the action as a faculty member whom he knew from years past.

The book's title is an homage to Francis Bacon's (1561–1626) philosophical tome, The Advancement of Learning.

== Publication history ==
- 1971, London: Collins Crime Club ISBN 0-00-231009-0, Pub date 1971, Hardback
- 1987, New York: Signet (Penguin) ISBN 0-451-14656-5, Paperback
- 1996, Toronto: Harper Collins Canada ISBN 0-586-07259-4, Paperback
- 2008, New York: Felony & Mayhem Press ISBN 978-1-934609-08-8, Pub date 2008.
