= Good Morning, Midnight (Hill novel) =

2004 novel by Reginald Hill

- First UK edition cover
- Author: Reginald Hill
- Language: English
- Series: Dalziel and Pascoe series, #20
- Genre: Detective fiction
- Published: 2004 HarperCollins
- Media type: Print (Hardback)

Good Morning, Midnight is a 2004 crime novel by British crime writer Reginald Hill, and part of the Dalziel and Pascoe series. The title takes its name from Good Morning -- Midnight, a poem by Emily Dickinson which is quoted throughout the story. Its adaptation for the TV series is Episode 37, Houdini's Ghost (2006).

== Plot summary ==
The plot involves Dalziel and Pascoe's investigation into the suicide of local businessman Palinurus 'Pal' Maciver, who has killed himself in similar circumstances to those of his father, who shot himself ten years earlier. However, what begins as a routine case of an apparent copycat suicide soon develops into something of a more sinister nature, revealing family secrets, corporate chicanery involving the arms trade, government agents and Iraq.

== Reception ==
T. J. Binyon found, that While the writing was "brilliant, witty and erudite", he was disappointed by the "intrusions of the machinations of the CIA" in the plot. Similarly, in a review in The Guardian, Mark Lawson thought the plot concerning the CIA and trying to connect to the two Gulf Wars was a "rare miscalculation" from Hill.
