= Susannah Corbett =

English actress and author

- Born: Susannah Jane Corbett; 10 August 1968 (age 58); Marylebone, London, England
- Education: East 15 Acting School
- Occupations: Actress, author
- Years active: 1991–present
- Spouse: Dan Hallam
- Children: 2
- Parents: Harry H. Corbett (father); Maureen Blott (mother)
- Website: www.susannahcorbett.co.uk

Susannah Jane Corbett (born 10 August 1968) is an English actress and author. Her acting career began in 1991 and she has performed on television, film and radio. As an author, she writes children's books.

== Early life ==
Born in Marylebone in London, Corbett is the daughter of actor Harry H. Corbett (known for the BBC Television sitcom Steptoe and Son) and his second wife Maureen (née Blott). She attended Moira House School in Eastbourne, East Sussex, and trained as an actress at East 15 Acting School, Debden, Loughton, Essex.

== Career ==
=== Acting ===
In 1991, Corbett had a small role (credited as "Lady in coach") in the adventure film Robin Hood: Prince of Thieves. She made her television debut in November that year, in an episode of the ITV comedy-drama series Minder.

Her first major role came on ITV in 1993, in an episode of the third series of Peak Practice, as a cystic fibrosis sufferer. She is best known for her role as Ellie Pascoe, wife of one of the title characters, Peter Pascoe, in Dalziel and Pascoe, a BBC television drama series based on Reginald Hill's Dalziel and Pascoe novels. She appeared in the series regularly between 1996 and 2000, returning for a guest appearance in 2005.

She then returned to Peak Practice to play Kerri Davidson, the physiotherapist, for three series. Corbett appeared in Holby City during October 2015.

=== Author ===
She began to write picture books for her children, and her first published work, Dragon's Dinner, was published on 20 August 2009. A second book, One Cool Cat, was published in spring 2011. She has also written the life story of her father, Harry H. Corbett: The Front Legs of the Cow, which was published in March 2012.

== Personal life ==
Corbett lives in a cottage in Ashburnham, East Sussex, with her family. She has two children.

== Filmography ==
| Year | Title | Media | Role | Notes |
|---|---|---|---|---|
| 1991 | Robin Hood: Prince of Thieves | film | Lady in Coach | |
| 1991 | Minder | television | Sadie Meadows | 1 episode: Too Many Crooks |
| 1993 | Screen One | television | Judith | 1 episode: The Bullion Boys |
| 1993 | Peak Practice | television | Vanessa Machin | 1 episode: Other Lives |
| 1993 | Casualty | television | Lynne | 1 episodes: The Ties That Bind |
| 1995 | A Mind to Murder | television | DS Kim Horrocks | |
| 1995 | First Knight | film | Young Woman in Crowd | |
| 1995 | The Bill | television | Laura Winters | 1 episode: Under the Doctor |
| 1996–2005 | Dalziel and Pascoe | television | Ellie Pascoe | Series regular (16 episodes) |
| 2000–2002 | Peak Practice | television | Kerri Davidson | 3 series: Skin Deep (2000), Still Waters (2001) and 12.13 (2002) |
| 2003 | Doctors | television | Jenny Reynolds | 1 episode: Deliverance |
| 2003 | Casualty | television | Sally Fielding | 1 episode: Love Hurts |
| 2010 | Holby City | television | Anne Patching | 1 episode: The Most Wonderful Time of the Year |

== Selected works ==
- Dragon's Dinner (2009)
- One Cool Cat (2011)
- Harry H. Corbett – The Front Legs of the Cow (2012)
