= A Killing Kindness =

1980 novel

- First edition
- Author: Reginald Hill
- Language: English
- Series: Dalziel and Pascoe #6
- Genre: crime novel
- Publisher: Collins Crime Club
- Publication date: 24 November 1980
- Publication place: United Kingdom
- Media type: Print (Hardcover)
- Pages: 256
- ISBN: 0-00-231406-1
- OCLC: 7631939
- Preceded by: A Pinch of Snuff
- Followed by: Deadheads

A Killing Kindness is a 1980 crime novel by Reginald Hill, the sixth novel in the Dalziel and Pascoe series.

== Publication history ==
- 1980, London: Collins Crime Club ISBN 0-00-231406-1, Pub date 24 November 1980, Hardback
