= Malcolm Tierney =

British actor (1938–2014)

- Malcolm Tierney in 1990
- Born: 25 February 1938; Failsworth, Lancashire, England
- Died: 18 February 2014 (aged 75); London, England
- Education: Manchester School of Art; Rose Bruford College
- Occupation: Actor
- Spouse: Andrea Schinko (m. 1979)
- Children: 2

Malcolm Tierney (25 February 1938 – 18 February 2014) was an English actor who appeared in many stage, film and television roles.

== Early life ==
Tierney's father, Ernest, was a boilermaker and trained draughtsman from Warrington, who worked at Blackpool Pleasure Beach. His mother, Agnes, née Kennedy, worked in the cotton mills.

Tierney attended St Mary's Roman Catholic School in Failsworth and studied design at the Manchester School of Art (now part of Manchester Metropolitan University). While working as a textile designer and printmaker, he became involved in amateur dramatics at the Little Theatre, in Bolton, which had been set up by John Wardle, father of the drama critic Irving Wardle, whose wife, Norma, became a mentor to Tierney. As a result, he began a scholarship with the Rose Bruford Training College of Speech and Drama, in Sidcup, Kent, in 1958 and landed his first acting job in 1962.

== Career ==
Tierney's roles included the part of Captain Monk Adderley in the original Poldark series, Tommy McArdle in Brookside between 1984 and 1987, Charlie Gimbert in Lovejoy (26 episodes, 1986 and 1993), Geoffrey Ellsworth-Smythe in A Bit of a Do, Patrick Woolton in House of Cards, Dennis Dudley in Bergerac in 1985 and Chief Const. Raymond in Dalziel and Pascoe. In science fiction, he appeared, uncredited, as the Imperial officer Shann Childsen who questions the disguised Luke Skywalker and Han Solo on what they are doing with Chewbacca in Star Wars in 1977, and guested in the Doctor Who serial The Trial of a Time Lord (Terror of the Vervoids) in 1986. He also appeared in Braveheart as the English sheriff who executes the wife of William Wallace and is then subsequently himself killed by Wallace.

Tierney appeared with the Royal Shakespeare Company in 1974–75 and 2005. In 1974 he played Claudio in Measure for Measure. In 2007 he played Dr Hugo Eckener in the docudrama Hindenburg: The Untold Story, which was about the crash of the airship Hindenburg and the investigation after it. This was aired for the 70th anniversary of the disaster.

In 2008 Tierney played Captain Smith of the RMS Titanic in the docudrama Titanic: The Unsinkable Ship.

On radio, Tierney played Commander Brill-Oudener in the BBC Radio drama The Snow Goose by Paul Gallico, originally transmitted in May 2010.

== Personal life ==
Tierney once shared a flat with Tom Baker, who is best known for his portrayal of the Fourth Doctor in the BBC TV series Doctor Who. In 1979, Tierney married Andrea Schinko, an Austrian artist who survives him with their two daughters: Elsa, an artist, and Anna, an actress. Tierney was a lifelong socialist, having been a member of the Workers Revolutionary Party in the 1970s.

== Death ==
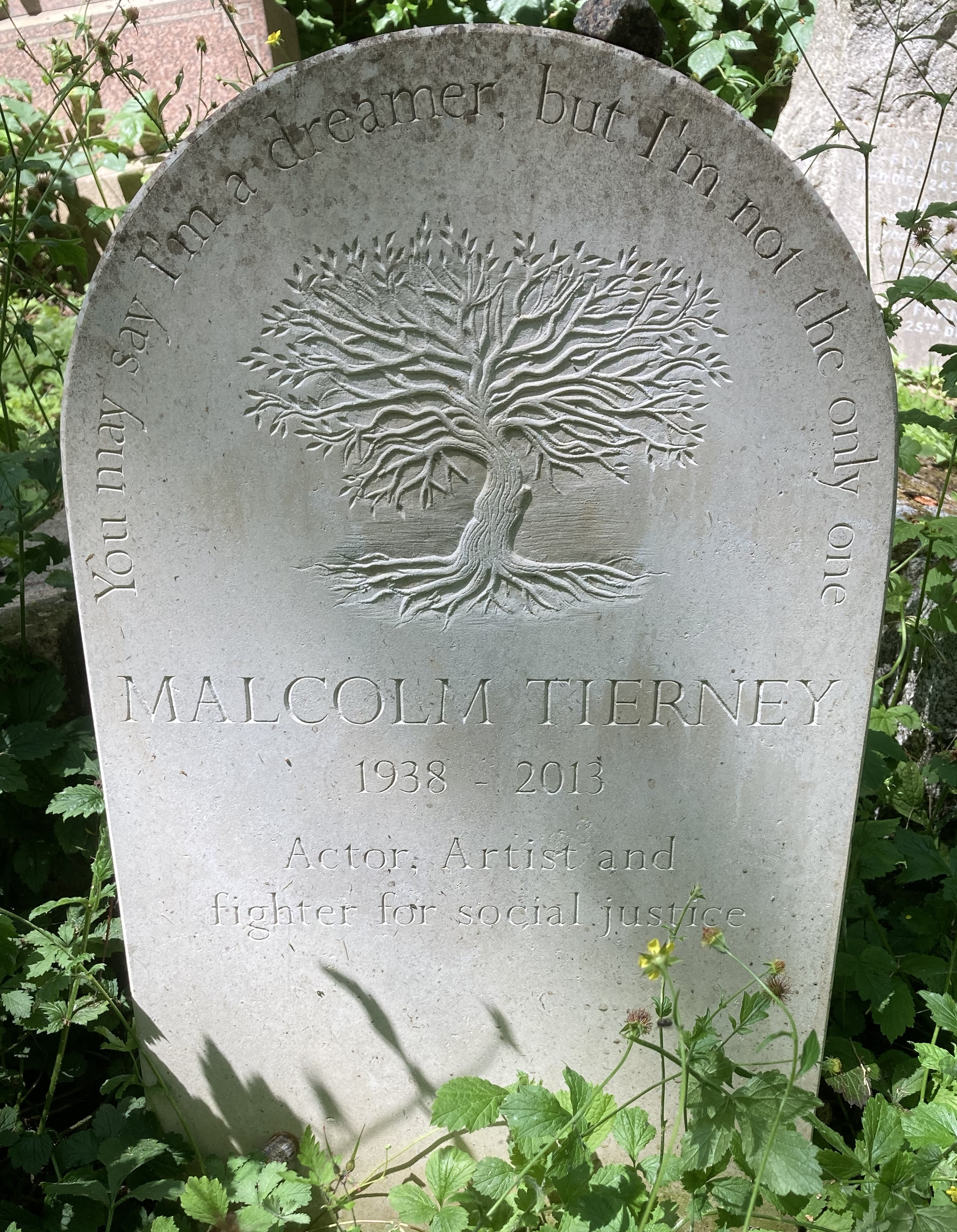
Grave of Malcolm Tierney in Highgate Cemetery (wrong year of death)

Tierney died on 18 February 2014, aged 75 of pulmonary fibrosis. Vanessa Redgrave wrote in his obituary of a "loving man" and a "brilliant actor". He is buried in Highgate Cemetery, London.

== Filmography ==
=== Film ===
Year	Title	Role	Notes	Ref.
1968	Last of the Long-haired Boys	Jason Trigg		
1969	All Neat in Black Stockings	Photographer		
1971	Family Life	Tim		
1973	The 14	Mr Michael		
1976	The Eagle Has Landed	German Officer	Uncredited	
1977	Star Wars	Lt. Shann Childsen (Imperial Prison Officer)	Uncredited	
1978	The Medusa Touch	Deacon		
1980	McVicar	Frank		
1987	Little Dorrit	Bar		
1993	In the Name of the Father	Home Office Official		
1995	Braveheart	Magistrate		
1997	The Saint	Russian doctor		
1998	L.A. Without a Map	Joy's Dad		
2000	Shiner	Fleming		
2002	The Final Curtain	Estate Agent		
2012	Great Expectations	Judge		
2014	The Smoke	Professor Arlo Greene	(final film role)	

=== Television ===
Year	Title	Role	Notes	Ref.
1967	Love on the Dole	Larry Meath		
1977	Poldark	Monk Adderley		
1979	Crime and Punishment	Zametov	TV serial	
1980–1981	The Spoils of War	Richard Warrington	TV serial	
1984–1986	Brookside	Tommy McArdle		
1986	Doctor Who	Doland	The Trial of a Time Lord, 4 episodes	
1986–1993	Lovejoy	Charlie Gimbert	28 episodes	
1989	A Bit of a Do	Geoffrey Ellsworth-Smythe / Spragg	5 episodes	
1990	House of Cards	Patrick Woolton		
1998–1999	Dalziel and Pascoe	Chief Constable Raymond		
2001	The Life and Adventures of Nicholas Nickleby	Mr Crummles		
2001	Heartbeat	Lawson	Episode: Home to Roost	
2002	Holby City	Wally Sands	Episode: All My Sins	
2008	Doctors	Howard Milnes	Episode: Mummy Dearest	
