= Recalled to Life (novel) =

1992 novel by Reginald Hill

- First edition (Collins Crime Club)
- Author: Reginald Hill
- Language: English
- Series: Dalziel and Pascoe series, #13
- Genre: Detective fiction
- Published: 1992 HarperCollins
- Publication place: United Kingdom
- Media type: Print (Hardback)
- ISBN: 978-0007313136
- Preceded by: One Small Step
- Followed by: Pictures of Perfection

Recalled to Life is a 1992 crime novel by Reginald Hill, and part of the Dalziel and Pascoe series, set in Yorkshire.

The novel tells the story of Dalziel's re-investigation of the 1963 murder at a local manor, Mickledore Hall, and the crime is billed as the last of the golden age murders. The murder took place shortly before the story of the Profumo affair broke, and during a weekend get together at the Hall.

The guests at Mickledore Hall that weekend included a government minister, a CIA officer who specialised in dirty tricks, a British diplomat with Royal connections, and the young American nanny charged with looking after the children of the house. The nanny, Cissy Kohler, was wrongly implicated in a murder committed by the local landowner, and has spent almost 30 years in prison as a result.

Following Cissy's release, Detective Superintendent Andrew Dalziel remains convinced of her guilt, but, investigating further, he begins to find his certainties being eroded. Not a state of affairs Dalziel is prepared to put up with, particularly as the reputation of his old mentor is on the line. Not to mention his own.

The title is a phrase from Charles Dickens' A Tale of Two Cities, referring to the long and unjust imprisonment of Dr Manette.
