= Dalziel and Pascoe =

Fictional detectives created by Reginald Hill

Andy Dalziel & Peter Pascoe
- First appearance: A Clubbable Woman
- Last appearance: Midnight Fugue
- Created by: Reginald Hill
- Portrayed by: BBC Radio: Philip Jackson (Dalziel) & Donald Gee (Pascoe); ITV: Gareth Hale (Dalziel) & Norman Pace (Pascoe); BBC: Warren Clarke (Dalziel) & Colin Buchanan (Pascoe); ITV/BritBox: Kerry Godliman (Dalziel) & Nina Singh (Pascoe)

In-universe information
- Gender: Male
- Title(s): Detective Superintendent (Dalziel), Detective Sergeant/Detective Inspector (Pascoe)
- Occupation: Policemen
- Nationality: British

Detective Superintendent Andrew "Andy" Dalziel /diːˈɛl/ and Detective Sergeant, later Detective Inspector, Peter Pascoe are two fictional Yorkshire detectives featuring in a series of novels by Reginald Hill.

== Characterisation and style ==
Dalziel is depicted as being rude, insensitive and blunt, whereas Pascoe is calm, polite and well mannered.

Hill's mysteries often break with storytelling tradition. The novels employ various structural tricks, such as presenting parts of the story in non-chronological order, or alternating with sections from a novel supposedly written by Peter's wife, Ellie Pascoe (née Soper). The novella One Small Step is even set in the future, and deals with the detectives investigating a murder on the moon. In another departure from the norm, the duo do not always "get their man", with at least one novel ending with the villain getting away and another strongly implying that what Dalziel and Pascoe dismiss as a series of unrelated accidents actually included at least one undetected instance of murder.

== The novels ==
The novels
Novel	Year released	TV Adaptation
A Clubbable Woman	1970	Series 1, Episode 1
An Advancement of Learning	1971	Series 1, Episode 2
Ruling Passion	1973	Series 2, Episode 1
An April Shroud	1975	Series 1, Episode 3 (re-titled "An Autumn Shroud")
A Pinch of Snuff	1978	ITV pilot adaptation
A Killing Kindness	1980	Series 2, Episode 2
Deadheads	1983	Series 2, Episode 3
Exit Lines	1984	Series 2, Episode 4
Child's Play	1987	Series 3, Episode 2
Under World	1988	Series 3, Episode 1
Bones and Silence	1990	Series 3, Episode 3
One Small Step	1990	
Recalled to Life	1992	Series 4, Episode 2
Pictures of Perfection	1994	
The Wood Beyond	1995	Series 3, Episode 4
Asking for the Moon (short stories)	1996	
On Beulah Height	1998	Series 4, Episode 1
Arms and the Women	1999	
Dialogues of the Dead	2002	Series 7, Episode 5
Death's Jest-Book	2003	
Good Morning, Midnight	2004	Inspiration for the episode Houdini's Ghost
The Death of Dalziel	2007	
A Cure for All Diseases	2008	
Midnight Fugue	2009	

== Adaptations ==
=== Television ===
- ITV adapted the novel A Pinch of Snuff in 1993 for a three-part serial. The serial starred comedy duo Gareth Hale as Dalziel and Norman Pace as Pascoe. Christopher Fairbank was cast as DS Edgar Wield. Reginald Hill was not happy with the adaptation, and it remained a one-off, much to ITV's disappointment.
- The BBC created a more successful series of adaptations, beginning in March 1996, with an adaptation of the first novel, A Clubbable Woman. Produced by BBC Birmingham, the series starred Warren Clarke as Dalziel, Colin Buchanan as Pascoe, David Royle as DS Edgar "Wieldy" Wield and Susannah Corbett as Ellie Pascoe. Later series introduced Jo-Anne Stockham as DC Shirley "Ivor" Novello, Keeley Forsyth as DC Carrie "Tweedie" Harris, Katy Cavanagh as DS Dawn "Spike" Milligan and Jennifer James as DC Kim "Posh" Spicer. Twelve series were produced in total, concluding in June 2007. The BBC series won much critical acclaim from newspapers such as The Daily Express and The Sunday Times. The television and novel continuities are separate, with both Ellie and Wield having appeared in the most recent books, despite having been written out of the TV series.
- ITV and BritBox are co-producing a new 6 episode series which began filming in early 2026, and will focus on female versions of the duo. The adaptation will star Kerry Godliman as DI Andrea Dalziel and Nina Singh as DS Paige Pascoe.

=== Radio ===
In 1990, Exit Lines was adapted as a five part serial for BBC Radio 4. Dalziel and Pascoe were voiced by Philip Jackson and Donald Gee, respectively.
