= Bones and Silence =

1990 novel by Reginald Hill

- First edition cover
- Author: Reginald Hill
- Language: English
- Series: Dalziel and Pascoe series, #11
- Genre: crime novel
- Publisher: Collins Crime Club
- Publication date: 22 March 1990
- Publication place: United Kingdom
- Media type: Print (Hardcover)
- Pages: 368p.
- ISBN: 0-00-232283-8
- OCLC: 20637300
- Preceded by: Under World
- Followed by: One Small Step

Bones and Silence is a 1990 crime novel by Reginald Hill, the eleventh novel in the Dalziel and Pascoe series. The novel received the Gold Dagger Award in 1990 and was nominated for the Edgar Award.

== Publication history ==
- 1990, London: Collins Crime Club ISBN 0-00-232283-8, Pub date 22 March 1990, Hardback
