= Jennifer James =

English actress

- Born: 1977 (age 48–49); Wigan, Lancashire, England
- Occupation: Actress
- Years active: 2000–present
- Spouse: Lee Boardman (m. 2001)
- Children: 2

Jennifer James is an English actress. She played the role of Geena Gregory in Coronation Street. Jennifer also starred in an episode of the TV show Brassic and she has also appeared in Dalziel and Pascoe portraying the character of PC later DC Kim "Posh" Spicer.
