= Felony & Mayhem Press =

American book publisher

- Founded: 2005
- Founder: Maggie Topkis
- Country of origin: United States
- Headquarters location: New York City
- Distribution: National Book Network
- Publication types: Books
- Fiction genres: Mystery
- Official website: felonyandmayhem.com

Felony & Mayhem Press is an American book publisher which specializes in re-issues of out-of-print mystery novels, first paperback editions of books previously published in hardcover, and U.S. editions of books that initially came out overseas. The company is located in New York City and was founded in June 2005 by Maggie Topkis, co-owner of the Greenwich Village bookstore, Partners and Crime. All Felony & Mayhem imprints are trade paperbacks. The company was called "the most dastardly local press" in the Village Voice's Best of New York 2008 issue.

Felony & Mayhem initially distributed only through independent bookstores and catalog sales, but later expanded distribution to major retailers. In 2005, the company's first catalog featured only twelve titles including Caroline Graham's The Killings at Badger's Drift, and Reginald Hill's Who Guards a Prince?. In 2009, the Felony & Mayhem catalog listed more than 125 titles.

== Founder ==
Maggie Topkis (born February 8, 1960, in New York City). Prior to establishing Mayhem, she was the co-owner of New York bookseller Partners and Crime, which closed in 2012. for over 15 years and had been the editor of a financial magazine.
