= Colin Buchanan (actor) =

Scottish actor

- Born: 1966 (age 59–60); Dundee, Scotland
- Occupation: Actor
- Spouse: Kim (divorced)
- Children: 2

Colin Buchanan (born 1966) is a Scottish actor who is best known for playing Detective Peter Pascoe in the BBC television series Dalziel and Pascoe which commenced in March 1996 and ran until June 2007.

== Career ==
Buchanan's breakthrough television role came in the detective series A Touch of Frost in 1994 playing Constable Austin in three episodes. In 1996 he commenced playing DS (later DI) Peter Pascoe in Dalziel and Pascoe. Buchanan has also appeared in comedy drama television series All Quiet on the Preston Front (later called Preston Front), The Bill, Between the Lines, Dangerfield, Heartbeat, Space Island One and Brief Encounters.

Buchanan had a supporting role in the feature movie Red Hot (1993) also starring Donald Sutherland and Balthazar Getty, a featured role in Witness Against Hitler (1995), starred in the television movie of Agatha Christie's The Pale Horse (1996) as Mark Easterbrook. Another BBC TV role Buchanan had was as the aristocratic seducer of Moll, in The Fortunes and Misfortunes of Moll Flanders (1996). He also starred as Freddie Musgrave in Catherine Cookson's The Secret (1999). In 2009 he co-starred in the CBC TV film Diverted.

Colin Buchanan has narrated several Reginald Hill audio books, including Deadheads and Exit Lines.

== Personal life ==
Buchanan was born and brought up in Dundee, Scotland. He is a graduate of the Drama Centre London (1991). Buchanan has two daughters, Kira and Maya, with his ex-wife, Kim. He is a keen supporter of Birmingham City F.C.
