= Dalziel and Pascoe (TV series) =

British detective series

- Genre: Crime drama Police procedural
- Starring: Warren Clarke; Colin Buchanan; David Royle; Susannah Corbett; Malcolm Tierney; Fred Pearson; Navin Chowdhry; Jo-Anne Stockham; Pippa Haywood; James Puddephatt; Marian McLoughlin; Keeley Forsyth; Diana Quick; Katy Cavanagh; Joe Savino; Wayne Perrey; Naomi Bentley; Jemma Hines; Jennifer James
- Country of origin: United Kingdom
- Original language: English
- No. of series: 12
- No. of episodes: 61 (list of episodes)

Production
- Running time: 60–90 minutes
- Production company: BBC Birmingham

Original release
- Network: BBC One
- Release: 16 March 1996 – 22 June 2007

Dalziel and Pascoe is a British television crime drama based on the mystery novels of the same name, written by Reginald Hill. The series was first broadcast on 16 March 1996, with Warren Clarke being cast as Dalziel (pronounced "dee-ell", /diːˈɛl/) and Colin Buchanan being cast as Pascoe. The series is primarily set in the fictional town of Wetherton in Yorkshire, and "follows the work of two detectives who are thrown together as partners. Complete opposites. Different backgrounds, different beliefs, different styles. They get on each other's nerves. They are continually embarrassed by each other. But their differences make them a stunningly brilliant crime-solving team."

The series was produced by BBC Birmingham, and broadcast on BBC One until 22 June 2007, running for a total of twelve series. The first three series, comprising eleven episodes, were entirely based on Hill's novels, as were the first two episodes of Series 4. However, all subsequent stories, with the exception of "Dialogues of the Dead", are stories written exclusively for television, and have not appeared as subsequent novels. The series was axed in 2008, citing falling viewing figures as the main reason. It was one of a number of dramas axed in a mass cull by newly appointed station controller Peter Fincham.

== Cast ==
- Warren Clarke as Detective Superintendent Andy Dalziel
- Colin Buchanan as Detective Inspector Peter Pascoe
- David Royle as Detective Sergeant Edgar "Wieldy" Wield (Series 1–7)
- Susannah Corbett as Ellie Pascoe (Series 1–5, Guest Series 9)
- Malcolm Tierney as Chief Constable Victor Raymond (Series 3–4)
- Fred Pearson as Dr. Thomas Vickery (Series 2–5)
- Navin Chowdhry as PC Sanjay Singh (Series 2)
- Jo-Anne Stockham as Detective Constable Shirley "Ivor" Novello (Series 4–6)
- Pippa Haywood as Assistant Chief Constable Rebecca Fenning (Series 5)
- James Puddephatt as Dr. Paul Ashurst (Series 6–8, Guest Series 11)
- Marian McLoughlin as Assistant Chief Constable Belinda Kennedy (Series 6)
- Keeley Forsyth as Detective Constable Carrie "Tweedie" Harris (Series 7)
- Diana Quick as Assistant Chief Constable Stella Applegarth (Series 7)
- Katy Cavanagh as Detective Sergeant Dawn "Spike" Milligan (Series 8)
- Joe Savino as Dr. Frank Mason (Series 8–12)
- Wayne Perrey as Detective Constable Parvez "Fez" Lateef (Series 9–11)
- Naomi Bentley as WPC Maria "Janet" Jackson (Series 9)
- Jemma Hines as WPC Claire "Lulu" Baines (Series 9–12)
- Jennifer James as Detective Constable Kim "Posh" Spicer (Series 10–12)

== Characters ==
Episodes listed beside a character with a "–" indicate the character's regular appearance in the show. Episodes listed separately are guest appearances made by the character before or after their regular stint.

=== Main characters ===
- Detective Superintendent Andy Dalziel (Warren Clarke) (Throughout): Dalziel—pronounced "dee-ELL"—is blunt-talking, politically incorrect, and very insensitive. He is from the old school of policing, in complete contrast with his younger side-kick, the fast-track university educated Pascoe. "Dalziel is a perfect pig. He is vulgar, loud and rude," says actor Warren Clarke. "But he is in fact also a great humanitarian and he gets very good results." Dalziel has been forced to confront the health problems caused by years of unhealthy living, including heavy drinking. He is a member of the Wetherton rugby and Liberal clubs, and can be often found at one of them in the evenings. He is not afraid of getting results.
- Detective Inspector Peter Pascoe (Colin Buchanan) (Throughout): University educated and well mannered, Pascoe is the complete opposite of his abrasive, impolite partner Dalziel. He is married with one child, but separates from his wife, Ellie, after the fifth series. They first met at university, before she dumped him due to his decision to join the police force. However, she soon decides to change her mind and give her relationship with Pascoe another go, to success. In later series, Pascoe struggles to get on with his difficult and obstinate father, who always resented his son's decision not to go into farming. He is also very good friends with Edgar "Wieldy" Wield.

=== Other detectives ===
- Detective Sergeant Edgar "Wieldy" Wield (David Royle) (A Clubbable Woman – Dialogues of the Dead): Edgar Wield presents as the sour one of the group, who appears not to share the sense of humour of either Dalziel nor Pascoe. But he has a good investigative eye. Occasionally he reveals he has a keen sense of humour, although usually he makes jokes, often quite subtle ones, with a very straight face. Aside from Pascoe, Wield is Dalziel's right-hand man, providing him with all of the evidence required to nail a suspect. Although moody and grumpy most of the time, Wield's eye is always on the ball, and he is ready to catch out any suspect with the evidence. Wield is revealed to be gay in the third series, but when he tries to inform Dalziel, Dalziel reveals he knew since his first day in CID, and that he was not fooling anyone.
- Detective Constable Shirley "Ivor" Novello (Jo-Anne Stockham) (On Beulah Height – Truth and Consequences): Shirley "Ivor" Novello is the inexperienced officer in the ranks, having been given a fast pass to CID through her excellent exam results and quick-thinking ability. She is gutsy, determined and ready to give any suspect a run for his money. Although sent undercover by Dalziel on multiple occasions, her tendency for asking too many questions usually blows her cover as a police officer. Despite the fact that she is nearly always one step ahead, she has been known to crumble in difficult situations, including attempting to foil a bomb plot on a horses' stables.
- Detective Constable Carrie "Tweedie" Harris (Keeley Forsyth) (The Unwanted – For Love Nor Money): Carrie "Tweedie" Harris is like the little dog on a lead which gnaws at someone's legs – she is determined to get the truth out of her suspect no matter the cost. More rough and ready than Ivor Novello, Tweedie is initially branded "Bomber" by Dalziel, although he soon decides that it is inappropriate, and renames her "Tweedie" in favour of Harris Tweed. By the time of her first appearance in Series 7, it appears she is established within the team, and is no newcomer to proceedings. Although she can be a little bit too eager at times, she is always prepared to give it 100%, and looks up to Dalziel.
- Detective Sergeant Dawn "Spike" Milligan (Katy Cavanagh) (A Game of Soldiers – Soft Touch): Dawn "Spike" Milligan does not have the naivety of her predecessors. She is experienced, prepared and knows exactly what is expected of her as one of the longest serving female detective sergeants on the Wetherton force. She is not fazed by Dalziel's archetypal methods and is the perfect accompaniment to calm Pascoe's brash side. Although she recently kicked out her husband, she is not ready to accept anybody else's advances, and is prepared to be an independent woman for a little while. She takes a dislike to Dalziel's temporary replacement, DCI Derek Hores in 'The Price of Fame'.
- Detective Constable Parvez "Fez" Lateef (Wayne Perrey) (Heads You Lose – The Cave Woman): Parvez Lateef is the bright boy with all the right ideas. He is able to work extremely well as an independent party but is also able to work effectively as part of a team. He is Dalziel's golden boy, able to come up with all the right results as and when he is required to. Perhaps the most educated and aware of all of the CID staff that Dalziel has had the pleasure to work with, Parvez is also great with computers, being able to analyse spreadsheets, figures and data to get information on the technological side of cases. He is loyal to his team, and is prepared to go the extra mile to catch the suspects.
- Detective Constable Kim "Posh" Spicer (Jennifer James) (Houdini's Ghost – Under Dark Stars): Kim "Posh" Spicer is the tom-boy of the group – she loves football, rock and roll and everything classic, but with a heart of gold and her head firmly screwed on her shoulders, she is the one you'd prefer to take out on a Friday night for a pint and a curry. A quick learner, fast thinker and with night classes having taught her to be fluent in Spanish, she is got just about every tool in the box when it comes to interviewing and detaining suspects. She quickly becomes a firm favourite with Dalziel, and DC Lateef even takes a bit of a shine to her. Initially a WPC, she progresses in CID.

=== Uniformed officers ===
- PC Sanjay Singh (Navin Chowdhry) (Ruling Passion – Exit Lines): Singh is a new recruit to the Wetherton force, eager to learn the tricks of the trade from Dalziel. He quickly proves himself resourceful, canny, and motivated in even the most complicated of investigations. In the episode "Deadheads", Singh is struck in the head and nearly killed. Wield demonstrates a telling tenderness toward Singh that sets up the revelation of his homosexuality. Singh's attachment to the team only lasts one series. As an explanation, Dalziel later reveals in "Child's Play" that Singh's departure was because Wieldy was getting misty-eyed over him and to protect everyone involved, he chose to "ship him up north" where he would continue his career.
- WPC Maria "Janet" Jackson (Naomi Bentley) (Heads You Lose – Dust Thou Art): Jackson is initially a little trigger happy, but perhaps only through her ambition to get training to join CID. Although she is at Dalziel's beck and call, she is determined to become her own person and stand out from the crowd. Her faith in the police force is questioned when she is kidnapped by two armed thugs in Dust Thou Art, but she quickly recovers to carry on as one of the main officers to accompany Dalziel and Pascoe. Although the pair did not initially hit it off, Dalziel builds up a bond with her, and they grow to respect each other.
- WPC Claire "Lulu" Baines (Jemma Hines) (Dust Thou Art, A Death in the Family, The Cave Woman – Under Dark Stars): Baines is not the cleverest officer. Initially, she is only the go-between for CID and uniform, but Dalziel realises that she has her uses, and begins to use her initiative more. Although not as outstanding as her equal-ranking colleagues in the field, Lulu has the ambition to learn and grow as an officer. Although Dalziel is blunt and informs her she has absolutely no chance of ever joining CID, Lulu is hopeful that one day, when Dalziel retires, his successor will be a little more lenient.

=== Chief constables ===
- Chief Constable Victor Raymond (Malcolm Tierney) (Child's Play, On Beulah Height – The British Grenadier): Raymond is perhaps the most experienced officer in the Wetherton force, having served 35 years of duty. However, some would describe him as a 'jobsworth' – following every rule right down to the last detail, and not being able to be the butt of the latest station joke now and again. He despises Dalziel for his callous and scheming antics, and often pulls him into the office to tell him so. He is also known to be homophobic, telling Dalziel to 'out' the gay officer in CID – Wieldy – which Dalziel refuses to do. He retires at the end of series four after bungling a major tactical operation.
- Assistant Chief Constable Rebecca Fenning (Pippa Haywood) (A Sweeter Lazarus – Above the Law): Fenning is the complete opposite of Victor Raymond – she is not frightened of chasing a suspect, regularly allows Dalziel to break the rules, and even compliments him with a bottle of single malt for a great result on a case. She is not afraid to tell the big wigs above her where to go – if she is onto a suspect, she is determined to catch them. Her relationship with Dalziel blossoms much more than that of her predecessor, so much that Dalziel is not even a tiny bit scared when he is pulled into her office for a quick telling off. Although only with the team very briefly, her effect on Dalziel is noticeable.
- Assistant Chief Constable Belinda Kennedy (Marian McLoughlin) (Walls of Silence – Truth and Consequences): Kennedy is a rule-player, who is not prepared to take any risks when it comes to major cases. She is described by Dalziel as a 'jobsworth', and the pair do not manage to bond, mainly because she tries to get him removed from a very personal case in 'Walls of Silence'. She is keen to see the back of Dalziel, but is valuing of Pascoe, often asking him to clean up Dalziel's mess in order to save the force from a big media scandal. She only appears in two episodes, the first being 'Walls of Silence'.
- Assistant Chief Constable Stella Applegarth (Diana Quick) (The Unwanted – For Love Nor Money): Applegarth is a sly, cunning old fox. On the surface, she seems like your typical play it by the book sort of copper, but truthfully, this is only because she is trying to cover up her own dirty deeds. When she is linked to long-time criminal Danny Macer in 'For Love Nor Money', Dalziel suspects she is part of a big pay-off which resulted in Macer being acquitted of the murder of informant Ted Barnes. Pursuing Stella to a showdown with Macer proves to be the biggest eye-opener, as the pair are revealed to be childhood sweethearts. Dalziel subsequently arrests her for murder, making it her final appearance.

=== Doctors ===
- Dr. Thomas Vickery (Fred Pearson) (Ruling Passion – Foreign Bodies): Vickery is the on-scene SOCO and pathologist attached to the local mortuary. He and Dalziel do not appear to like each other, mainly because they are so much alike. Vickery is blunt, to the point and not afraid to say what he thinks – a lot like Dalziel. But when it comes to the crunch, he is extremely hard-working, and picks through every little detail to provide Dalziel with the evidence he needs to convict a suspect. He is regularly supported by his team of younger doctors and trainees, who sometimes carry out postmortems for him when he is off duty. He later retires from his post.
- Dr. Paul Ashurst (James Puddephatt) (Walls of Silence – Dialogues of the Dead, Great Escapes, Soft Touch, Fallen Angel): Ashurst is nerdy, with all the tiniest details about the victim in question. He manages to get results quickly and efficiently. Although starting in a minor capacity, he soon builds to helping Dalziel with all sorts of sticky situations, and as well as going out into the field, is very handy with cutting tools back at the lab. He helps provide a quick result on the death of Alec Jordan in 'Walls of Silence', and this quickly cements his working relationship.
- Dr. Frank Mason (Joe Savino) (A Game of Soldiers – Under Dark Stars): Mason has been in the job for more years than Dalziel can care to remember – and the fact they are old school friends makes for a reminiscing moment once in a while. Despite that, Mason is an old-school sort of 'not prepared to give anything away – you're the detective' kind of doctor, sticking to the essentials only, even to stopping halfway through an autopsy and going home simply because it is five-o'-clock. His non-elaborations are not always helpful when it comes to solving a murder as quickly as possible making Dalziel push for further information.

=== Other characters ===
- Ellie Pascoe (née Soper) (Susannah Corbett) (A Clubbable Woman – Above the Law, Dead Meat): Ellie is Pascoe's long-suffering wife, whom he marries in "An Autumn Shroud" after being persuaded by Dalziel to get down on one knee. Ellie, an idealist, was completely against Pascoe's decision to join the police force, so much that despite their being childhood sweethearts, it ended their relationship for a while, before the pair became friends again and rekindled their romance. She maintains a light antagonism toward Dalziel due to his round-the-clock policing style which frequently pulls her husband from his family. Ellie and Pascoe also have a child, Rose, born during the second series, for whom Andy Dalziel is the godfather. In the Under World episode, Ellie develops an inappropriate closeness to one of her students, throwing profound doubts on her future with Pascoe. The pair separate at the end of the fifth series after longstanding differences. Ellie returns to England in Dead Meat, newly engaged to an American man.

== Home media ==
The series has been released in Australia (Region 4, as below). There was a three-year delay between Series Two and Three and also Series Ten and Series Eleven.

- Series One – 5 September 2007
- Series Two – 2 April 2008
- Series Three – 6 February 2011
- Series Four – 5 May 2011
- Series Five – 4 August 2011
- Series Six – 12 February 2012
- Series Seven – 12 June 2012
- Series Eight – 3 October 2012
- Series Nine – 3 April 2013
- Series Ten – 17 September 2014
- Series Eleven – 15 February 2017
- The Complete Series 1–11 – 15 February 2017

== 2026 reimagining ==
In January 2026, it was confirmed that ITV were planning a "contemporary reimagining" of the series. On 10 February, it was announced that the lead characters would be reinterpreted as female, with Kerry Godliman cast as DI Andrea Dalziel and Nina Singh as DS Paige Pascoe. The series consisting of six episodes will begin filming in spring 2026 and has been commissioned by BritBox in association with ITV and All3Media production company West Road Pictures.
