= Reginald Hill =

British crime writer

- Born: 3 April 1936; West Hartlepool, England
- Died: 12 January 2012 (aged 75); Ravenglass, Cumbria, England
- Occupation: Novelist
- Spouse: Patricia Ruell (1960–2012)
- Writing career
- Genre: Crime fiction

Reginald Charles Hill FRSL (3 April 1936 – 12 January 2012) was an English crime writer and the winner in 1995 of the Crime Writers' Association Cartier Diamond Dagger for Lifetime Achievement. He was inducted into the Detection Club in 1978.

== Biography ==
Hill was born to a "very ordinary" family. His father, Reg Hill, was a professional footballer. His mother was a fan of Golden Age crime writers, and he discovered the genre while fetching her library books. He passed the eleven plus exam and attended Carlisle Grammar School where he excelled in English. After National Service (1955–57) and studying English at St Catherine's College, Oxford (1957–60), he worked as a teacher for many years, becoming a senior lecturer at Doncaster College of Education. In 1980 he retired from salaried work to devote himself full-time to writing.

Hill is best known for his more than 20 novels featuring the Yorkshire detectives Andrew Dalziel, Peter Pascoe and Edgar Wield. The characters were used by the BBC in the Dalziel and Pascoe series, in which Dalziel was played by Warren Clarke, Pascoe by Colin Buchanan, and Wield by David Royle. He also wrote more than 30 other novels, including five featuring Joe Sixsmith, a black machine operator turned private detective in a fictional Luton. Novels originally published under the pseudonyms of Patrick Ruell, Dick Morland, and Charles Underhill have now appeared under his own name. Hill was also a writer of short stories and ghost tales.

Hill's novels employ various structural devices, such as presenting parts of the story in non-chronological order or alternating with sections from a novel supposedly written by Peter's wife, Ellie Pascoe (née Soper). He also frequently selected one writer or one work of art to use as a central organizing element of a given novel, such as one novel being a pastiche of Jane Austen's works, or another featuring elements of classical Greek myth. The novella One Small Step (dedicated to "you, dear readers, without whom the writing would be in vain, and to you, still dearer purchasers, without whom the eating would be infrequent") is set in the future, and deals with the EuroFed Police Commissioner Pascoe and retired Dalziel investigating the first murder on the moon. The duo do not always "get their man", with at least one novel ending with the villain getting away and another strongly implying that while Dalziel and Pascoe are unable to convict anyone, a series of unrelated accidents actually included at least one unprovable instance of murder.

Hill commented in 1986:

I still recall with delight as a teen-ager making the earth-shaking discovery that many of the great "serious novelists," classical and modern, were as entertaining and interesting as the crime-writers I already loved. But it took another decade of maturation to reverse the equation and understand that many of the crime writers I had decided to grow out of were still as interesting and entertaining as the "serious novelists" I now revered.

Hill died at his home in Ravenglass, Cumbria, on 12 January 2012 after suffering a brain tumour.

== Bibliography ==
=== Dalziel and Pascoe ===
1. A Clubbable Woman (1970)
2. An Advancement of Learning (1971)
3. Ruling Passion (1973)
4. An April Shroud (1975)
5. A Pinch of Snuff (1978)
6. A Killing Kindness (1980)
7. Deadheads (1983)
8. Exit Lines (1984)
9. Child's Play (1987)
10. Underworld (1988)
11. Bones and Silence (1990)
12. One Small Step (1990), novella
13. Recalled to Life (1992)
14. Pictures of Perfection (1994)
15. The Wood Beyond (1995)
16. Asking for the Moon (1996), short stories
  - "The Last National Service Man"
  - "Pascoe's Ghost"
  - "Dalziel's Ghost"
  - "One Small Step"
17. On Beulah Height (1998)
18. Arms and the Women (1999)
19. Dialogues of the Dead (2002)
20. Death's Jest-Book (2003)
21. Good Morning, Midnight (2004)
22. The Death of Dalziel (2007), Canada and US Title: Death Comes for the Fat Man
23. A Cure for All Diseases (Canada and US title: The Price of Butcher's Meat) (2008) Shortlisted for Theakston's Old Peculier Crime Novel of the Year Award 2009.
24. Midnight Fugue (2009)

=== Joe Sixsmith ===
- Blood Sympathy (1993)
- Born Guilty (1995)
- Killing the Lawyers (1997)
- Singing the Sadness (1999)
- The Roar of the Butterflies (2008)

=== Other ===
- Fell of Dark (1971)
- The Castle of the Demon (1971) (As Patrick Ruell) (also published as The Turning of the Tide)
- A Fairly Dangerous Thing (1972)
- Red Christmas (1972) (As Patrick Ruell)
- Heart Clock (1973) (As Dick Morland) (also published as Matlock's System as Reginald Hill)
- Death Takes a Low Road (1974) (As Patrick Ruell) (also published as The Low Road)
- A Very Good Hater (1974)
- Albion! Albion! (1974) (As Dick Morland) (also published as Singleton's Law as Reginald Hill)
- Beyond the Bone (1975) (also published as Urn Burial ) (As Patrick Ruell)
- Another Death in Venice (1976)
- Captain Fantom (1978) (As Charles Underhill) – inspired by the life of Carlo Fantom
- The Forging of Fantom (1979) (As Charles Underhill)
- Pascoe's Ghost and Other Brief Chronicles of Crime [SS] (1979)
1. "Pascoe's Ghost" # (A Dalziel and Pascoe story)
2. "The Trunk in the Attic"
3. "The Rio de Janeiro Paper"
4. "Threatened Species"
5. "Snowball"
6. "Exit Line"
7. "Dalziel's Ghost" (A Dalziel and Pascoe story)
- The Spy's Wife (1980)
- Who Guards a Prince? (1982)
- Traitor's Blood (1983)
- Guardians of the Prince (1983)
- No Man's Land (1985)
- The Long Kill (1986) (As Patrick Ruell)
- There Are No Ghosts in the Soviet Union and Other Stories [SS](1987)
1. "There Are No Ghosts in the Soviet Union" (Novella)
2. "Bring Back the Cat!" (A Joe Sixsmith story)
3. "Poor Emma"
4. "Auteur Theory" (A Dalziel and Pascoe story)
5. "The Bull Ring"
6. "Crowded Hour"
- The Collaborators (1987)
- Death of a Dormouse (1987) (As Patrick Ruell)
- Dream of Darkness (1989) (As Patrick Ruell)
- Brother's Keeper (1992) (short stories)
- The Only Game (1993) (As Patrick Ruell)
- The Stranger House (2005)
- The Woodcutter (2010)

=== Short stories ===
- "Fool of Myself" (2005), published in The Detection Collection, edited by Simon Brett.

== Awards and honours ==
- 1990 British Crime Writers' Association Gold Dagger for Bones and Silence
- 1995 British Crime Writers' Association Diamond Dagger Lifetime Achievement Award
- 1997 British Crime Writers' Association Short Story Dagger for On the Psychiatrist's Couch in WHYDUNNIT, The 1997 CWA Anthology (Severn House)
- 1999 Elected Fellow of the Royal Society of Literature
- 1999 The Barry Award for Best Novel for On Beulah Height
- 2001 The Macavity Award for Best Short Story for A Candle for Christmas in EQMN, January 2000.
- 2011 The Barry Award for Best British Novel for The Woodcutter
