= A Good Thief =

- Genre: Crime drama
- Written by: Kay Mellor
- Directed by: Douglas Mackinnon
- Starring: Kay Mellor; Liz Smith; Angel Coulby; Martin Reeve; Vincent Davies; Tony Melody; Denise Black
- Composer: Martin Phipps
- Country of origin: United Kingdom
- Original language: English
- No. of episodes: 1

Production
- Executive producer: David Hart
- Producer: Pippa Cross
- Cinematography: Peter Greenhalgh
- Editor: Andrew McClelland
- Running time: 90 minutes
- Production company: Granada Television

Original release
- Network: ITV
- Release: 22 July 2002

A Good Thief is a British television crime drama film, written by and starring Kay Mellor, that first broadcast on ITV on 22 July 2002. The film, directed by Douglas Mackinnon, stars Mellor as Rita Pickering, a working class mother who witnesses a brutal drugs killing. After she testifies in court, she is threatened by a number of gang members, and fearing for her life, goes on the run and is forced to turn to shoplifting to survive.

Liz Smith stars as Rita's elderly neighbour Lizzie, while Angel Coulby takes on the role of Rita's daughter Leah. The film was Mellor's first acting role in several years after initially giving up acting and turning her hand to scriptwriting. The film drew 6.06 million viewers on its debut broadcast. Notably, the film has never been released on VHS or DVD.

== Casting ==
The film was shelved for several years after the initial casting fell through. Mellor stated; "A Good Thief was the only script that ended up in my trunk unproduced. I wrote it for Pippa Cross and Granada Television and when the original casting fell through it was something I put to one side while I concentrated on other projects." Mellor stated she originally wrote the role of Rita for Julie Walters, although she was unable to commit to the role due to other work commitments.

== Reception ==
The Northern Echo reviewed the film following its debut broadcast, commenting: "This was one of those TV movies that couldn't decide whether to be funny or serious. Mixing killings and beatings up with almost slapstick comic capers is difficult. And A Good Thief lurched uncertainly from comedy to drama, leaving the poor viewer uncertain if to laugh or cry. Or just switch off."

== Cast ==
- Kay Mellor as Rita Pickering
- Liz Smith as Lizzie
- Angel Coulby as Leah Pickering
- Martin Reeve as Ray Delaney
- Vincent Davies as Micky Pickering
- Tony Melody as Alfie
- Denise Black as Janet Lavery
- Richard Heap as Jez
- Adrian Kennedy as Rob
- Burn Gorman as DC Fairchild
- Anthony Bessick as Gus Dickenson
- Susan Twist as Mrs. Sutherland
- Terence Harvey as Ivor Thackery
- Paul Gibbons as Anton
- Naomi Radcliffe as Joanne
- Basienka Blake as Roanna
- Karen Meagher as Mrs. Shipley
- Annie Fitzmaurice as Sarah
- Clive Bonelle as Steve
- Jeff Merchant as Mr. Stanley
- Gordon Alcock as Norman
