= The Deep End (2010 TV series) =

American television series

- The Deep End title card from the pilot episode of the show.
- Genre: Legal drama
- Created by: David Hemingson
- Starring: Matt Long; Norbert Leo Butz; Ben Lawson; Tina Majorino; Clancy Brown; Billy Zane; Mehcad Brooks; Leah Pipes; Nicole Ari Parker
- Country of origin: United States
- Original language: English
- No. of seasons: 1
- No. of episodes: 6

Production
- Executive producers: David Hemingson; Michael Fresco
- Producers: Sanford Golden; Karen Wyscarver
- Running time: 60 minutes
- Production companies: Hemingson Entertainment; 20th Century Fox Television

Original release
- Network: ABC
- Release: January 21 – February 25, 2010

The Deep End is an American legal drama television series created by David Hemingson that ran on ABC from January 21 until February 25, 2010 and produced by 20th Century Fox Television. Starring Mehcad Brooks, Matt Long, Tina Majorino, Clancy Brown, and Billy Zane, the show follows five first-year associate attorneys from diverse backgrounds as they learn how to cope with the challenges of working at one of the most prestigious law firms in Los Angeles.

Hemingson based the series on his work experience as an attorney. To cut production costs, the show was filmed in Las Colinas, a real estate development in Irving, Texas; ABC scheduled a six-episode run, and the series premiered as a midseason replacement on January 21, 2010. The show was described as a cross between L.A. Law and Grey's Anatomy, but it was criticized for its lack of originality and for reusing ideas from similar shows. Critics said the show was so poor, it was a failure after its first episode.

On May 14, 2010, ABC cancelled the series after one season.

== Plot ==
Five recent law school graduates from different backgrounds begin working together as first-year associates at Sterling, Huddle, Oppenheim & Craft, a fictional prestigious law firm located in Los Angeles; they are thrown in the deep end and are forced to deal with court cases that conflict with their personal beliefs and ethics. The "Prince of Darkness", Cliff Huddle, is initially their boss, but things start to change when firm partner Hart Sterling returns after a long hiatus spent taking care of his sick wife. Even though the firm's partners make things difficult for them, the five attorneys quickly bond under pressure as they learn to make tough ethical decisions.

== Cast and characters ==
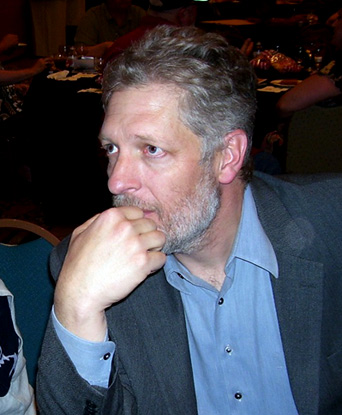
Clancy Brown plays Hart Sterling who inherited the law firm and is one of its managing partners.

=== Main ===
- Matt Long as Dylan Hewitt, an earnest, idealistic and innocent young man. Hewitt is the hero of the story, an Ivy League graduate who believes in justice. Hewitt is attracted to Katie Campbell, the firm's paralegal. Long's performance has been described as an "older version" of Jack McCallister, a character Long played from 2004–2005 on the television series Jack & Bobby.
- Norbert Leo Butz as Rowdy Kaise, the firm's associate and chief talent scout; He acts as a mentor to the new recruits. Kaiser has an arrogant personality and makes empty promises. Kaiser loves corn liquor and cashmere wool.
- Ben Lawson as Liam Priory, a first-year associate from Australia who is "too-cool" and possesses an uncircumcised penis. Priory has a self-described "impulse-control problem" when it comes to dealing with women, as he has sex with almost every woman in the law firm, except Adelaide "Addy" Fisher. Priory made his appearance in the first episode with his pants down to his ankles.
- Tina Majorino as Adelaide "Addy" Fisher, a meek and insecure first-year associate. Fisher comes from a large family in the Midwest. She graduated top in her class at Case Western Reserve University and has "great legal instincts and a natural 'flair' for the law". She likes to bake. Hemingson created the character of Fisher as a CWRU alumna because one of the most intelligent people he knows attended that school.
- Clancy Brown as Hart Sterling, the firm's managing partner; Sterling inherited the title through his family. Sterling believes that the law is a calling that can be used to enhance society and the world; he also believes the firm should do good, including pro bono work.

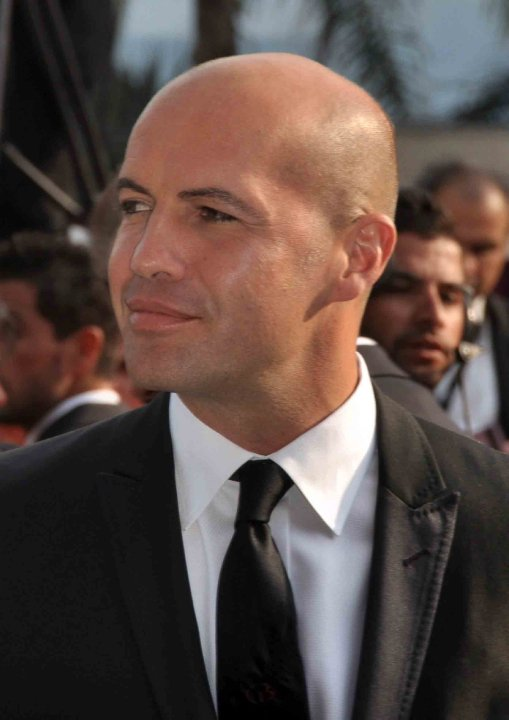
Billy Zane plays Cliff Huddle, also known as the "Prince of Darkness".

- Billy Zane as Clifford "Cliff" Huddle, the firm's other managing partner. Known as the "Prince of Darkness", Huddle is "cold" and "ruthless", and is considered the villain of the show. Although he is married to Susan Oppenheim, the firm's litigation partner, he has an affair with the firm's paralegal. Brimming with contempt, he thinks law is a way to make money, and does not care about the broader consequences. Huddle asserts that the firm should be run "as a business, not as a soup kitchen". He also frequently clashes with Sterling due to their diametrically opposed convictions about the law.
- Mehcad Brooks as Malcolm Bennet, an outsider and first-year associate. Regarding the show and the topics it covers, Brooks says, "It definitely plucks at your heartstrings. But its quick-witted, glib, slightly arrogant, and very inspirational. It's some of the funniest stuff I ever read in my whole life−."
- Leah Pipes as Elizabeth "Beth" Branford, a wealthy, blond, first-year associate. Although she seems self-assured, she is secretly vulnerable and thinks money can buy a career.
- Nicole Ari Parker as Susan Oppenheim, the firm's head litigation partner and the wife of Clifford "Cliff" Huddle. Together, Oppenheim and Huddle are antagonists against Sterling. Oppenheim chooses to go to jail rather than miss a motion–filing dateline.

=== Recurring ===
- Rachelle Lefevre as Katie Campbell
- David Giuntoli as Jason Carpenter

== Production ==
The Deep End was created by David Hemingson, co-executive producer of How I Met Your Mother. Before he became a writer and a producer, Hemingson was formerly an associate in a law firm. The Deep End is based on Hemingson's early work experience as an attorney. Due to the cost of filming on location in Los Angeles where the story takes place, the show was filmed on a soundstage in the planned community of Las Colinas in Irving, Texas. Despite the change in location, references to local Los Angeles landmarks were still made on the show. 20th Century Fox Television produced the show for ABC. The show was described as L.A. Law meets Grey's Anatomy. Hemingson said the show contains "the back-stabbing of The Devil Wears Prada and the sun-drenched bed-hopping of Entourage". Texas Film Commission head Bob Hudgins estimated production costs at about $20 million. ABC scheduled six episodes of The Deep End for Thursday nights.

ABC canceled the show in May 2010.

== Episodes ==
No.	Title	Directed by	Written by	Original release date	Prod. code
1	"Pilot"	Michael Fresco	David Hemingson	January 21, 2010	1ARH79
Dylan faces a difficult pro bono case. Beth does not speak up when her client, a 90-year-old senile man, signs an agreement thinking she is his long-dead daughter. Liam lies to bring on a new client for the firm. Addy gets Susan's attention when she spoke her mind. Malcolm is hired out of the firm's traditional process.
2	"Where There's Smoke"	Timothy Busfield	Jan Nash	January 28, 2010	1ARH02
Beth and her father goes head to head in court. Addy's new clients puts the firm in danger. Cliff reveals something to Susan which causes Katie to be sent to the firm's Montana offices indefinitely. Liam unwittingly embarks on a love quest of sorts.
3	"To Have and to Hold"	Timothy Busfield	Jami O'Brien	February 4, 2010	1ARH04
A CIA case has Dylan fighting with the law while Beth and Addy struggle to represent a not-so-innocent client in a sexual harassment case. Malcolm's brother is expelled from school for bringing in a weapon. Meanwhile, Liam turns to Rowdy for advice on courting and Cliff turns to Hart, to try to save his marriage.
4	"Nothing Personal"	Adam Arkin	Sanford Golden & Karen Wyscarver	February 11, 2010	1ARH03
Malcolm and Liam are pitted against each other. Dylan and Beth are assigned a pro bono case involving a tennis player who lost her scholarship.
5	"An Innocent Man"	Dennie Gordon	Aaron Korsh	February 18, 2010	1ARH05
Dylan and Liam realize that they are the only ones who believe their client is innocent. Addy receives a surprise visit from her long-distance boyfriend.
6	"White Lies, Black Ties"	Tom Verica	David Hemingson & Jan Nash	February 25, 2010	1ARH06
The interns are expected to attend a fashionable work function. Addy refuses to attend and Beth does not want her partner to go with her. Cliff tries to work on his failing marriage.

== Reception ==
=== Ratings ===
The show premiered on January 21, 2010 as a 2009–2010 midseason replacement for FlashForward, attracting 7 million viewers and receiving a low 1.7 rating in the category of Adults 18-49.

=== Critical response ===
The series received a negative critical response, averaging 40/100 on Metacritic, based on 23 reviews with one positive, 14 mixed, and eight negatives. Critics said that the show lacked originality and appeared similar to shows like L.A. Law, The Practice, Boston Legal, Damages, Eli Stone and The Good Wife. The show premiered in the time slot before Grey's Anatomy and Private Practice, leading the Washington Post to say that The Deep End resembled the two other shows "closely enough to warrant a paternity test". Toni Fitzgerald of Media Life Magazine said that even though The Deep End received a great deal of publicity, the show "sank in its first outing". Tom Maurstad of the Dallas Morning News observed that it was noticeable that the show was shot in Las Colinas, not in its setting of Los Angeles. Alan Sepinwall of The Star-Ledger said the show consisted of a "bunch of attractive people in suits saying the same lines". Glenn Garvin of The Miami Herald described the show as "a dreadful attempt to duplicate Grey's Anatomy in a law office". Mark Peikert of the New York Press said that the show was "sailing in shallow waters".

=== Criticism ===
Attorneys criticized the show as unrealistic due to numerous violations of the ABA Model Rules of Professional Conduct by the fictional attorneys on the show. The show was also criticized for its depiction of young associates performing tedious legal research with hard copy books in a law library; a firm the size and caliber of Sterling, Huddle, Oppenheim, & Craft would have a subscription to online databases like Westlaw or LexisNexis.
