= Naomi Radcliffe =

British actress

- Born: 16 November 1971 (age 54); Oldham, Lancashire, England
- Education: Royal Welsh College of Music & Drama
- Occupation: Actress
- Years active: 1995–present
- Parent: Albert Radcliffe

Naomi Radcliffe (born 16 November 1971) is an English actress. She was born in Oldham, Lancashire to Albert Radcliffe—a Canon of Manchester Cathedral—and Petrina, a teacher. She was educated at The Blue Coat School in Oldham and the Royal Welsh College of Music and Drama, having not been accepted on her first attempt.

Her first professional stage appearance was in Be My Baby in 1997. Early television appearances include major roles in Kay Mellor's Band of Gold and Russell T Davies's The Grand, before she took the role of Alison Wakefield in the Granada Television soap opera Coronation Street. She remained on the soap for two years between 1998 and 2000. When her contract was not renewed, the character was written out in a scene that saw her commit suicide by jumping in front of a lorry. The scene, watched by 17 million viewers, won Radcliffe the British Soap Award for Best Exit. From 2002 to 2005, she played Jean Bradshaw in the BBC drama Born and Bred. In 2007 she played Bev in the BBC Three situation comedy The Visit.

== Credits and awards ==
Year	Production	Role	Other notes
1995	Band of Gold	Sarah	
1996	In Suspicious Circumstances	Belulah Turner	1 episode ("Ring of Truth")
1996	Coronation Street	Secretary	1 episode
1997–1998	The Grand	Lynne Milligan	2 series, 1997–1998
1998	Cold Feet	Woman with Baby	1 episode (Series 1, Episode 6)
1998–2000	Coronation Street	Alison Wakefield	1998 – 2000; Won, British Soap Award for Best Exit
1999	Sunburn	Clare Alcock	1 episode (Series 1, Episode 6)
1999	Where the Heart Is	Nurse	1 episode ("Flesh and Blood")
2000	Queer as Folk 2	Judith Collins	Part 1
2002	24 Hour Party People	Twitchy Girl	
2002	Nice Guy Eddie	Michelle	1 episode (Series 1, Episode 6)
2002	A Good Thief	Joanne	Television film
2002–2005	Born and Bred	Jean Bradshaw	2002–2005
2006	The Royal	Ella Hale	1 episode ("Waifs and Strays")
2007	New Street Law	Lisa Grant	1 episode (Series 2, Episode 6)
2007	The Visit	Bev	1 series
2007	Heartbeat	Mary Masters	1 episode ("Touch and Go")
2011	Holby City	Amanda	1 episode ("Running the Gauntlet")
2012	Scott & Bailey	Frances Bishop	Series 2 Episode 6
2015	Spotless	Maureen Devine	Season 1
2025–2026	Father Brown	Violet Goodfellow	2 episodes (Series 12, episode 9), (Series 13, episode 6)
