= Tony Melody =

English actor (1922–2008)

- Born: Anthony John Melody; 18 December 1922; London, England
- Died: 26 June 2008 (aged 85); Bispham, Blackpool, Lancashire, England
- Occupation: Actor
- Years active: 1955–2005
- Spouses: Unknown (divorced) Margaret Little (m. 1972)
- Children: 4

Anthony John Melody (18 December 1922 – 26 June 2008) was an English television character actor who appeared in a number of long running comedies and soap operas, with more than 100 television roles.

== Early life ==
Melody was born in London, where his father was in the Royal Horse Guards, but was brought up in Yorkshire, where his parents ran the Station public house in Goole, West Riding of Yorkshire. (Note: Prior to 1 April 1974 Goole was part of the West Riding of Yorkshire) It was as a singer that he initially made his mark, starting out at the pub his mother Myra ran with his father, where, as a small boy, he accompanied the pianist; later in life he went on to sing with the BBC Northern Dance Orchestra.

He was raised as a devout Roman Catholic and attended Sacred Heart Church in Blackpool. During the Second World War he served in the Royal Air Force.

== Career ==
Initially as a dancer, Melody spent three years touring the Mediterranean with Ralph Reader's Gang Show, performing for British troops in various countries, along with Tony Hancock and Norrie Paramor. In 1952, Melody spent a season performing at the Windmill Theatre in London, among the nudes, where he featured as a comedy singer, before returning to Yorkshire, where he performed semi-professionally in local clubs while working in a factory in Leeds during the day. In 1955, he appeared on What Makes A Star? on BBC local radio. He became a regular on BBC regional radio, working in the North region of the BBC Home Service from 1958 with, among others, Jimmy Clitheroe (who he also appeared with on stage, touring variety theatres) and with Harry Worth. With Clitheroe, Melody did a regular double act on a radio variety show, Call Boy, as well as doing much the same act together on stage in the theatres.

Melody's acting career at the BBC began in radio, appearing in the sitcom The Clitheroe Kid, another show which starred Clitheroe, in which Melody appeared from 1957 as grumpy taxi driver Horatio Higginbottom, a regular role that he continued in for sixteen years, until 1972. In the 1950s, Melody also had a regular role as compère and singer with the BBC's Northern Dance Orchestra, in the BBC radio show The Straw Hat Club.

His first television role came on 6 December 1957, when he appeared in the BBC comedy Be Soon, alongside comedian Hylda Baker. Between 1964 and 1968, he appeared regularly on ITV with Clitheroe in the sitcom Just Jimmy, and featured in two episodes of ITV's Coronation Street, playing two small different roles, as a coach driver and a taxi driver. In 1968, Melody made his third appearance on Coronation Street, this time as Harold Eaton, a decorator working at the Rovers Return pub. He also reappeared as a compere in 2000 in an episode filmed in the Blackpool Winter Gardens. In 1969, he played a postman in Parkin's Patch. He also played a teacher in Colin Welland's play Roll on Four O'Clock in 1970.

By the early 1970s, Melody was getting regular television work, with a number of minor roles (mostly in comedy parts) in programmes including the BBC sitcom Steptoe and Son (as a milkman in the 1970 episode "Come Dancing", which is said to be one of the most repeated episodes of that series). Melody also appeared on the BBC in the sitcom Sykes, and on ITV in Public Eye (as guest star in a humorous Christmas special), both in 1972, at which time Melody said, "This is the first time in years I have turned down pantomime, up home in Blackpool, because I wanted to concentrate on television, to stretch myself with such roles." However, these were straightforward comedy supporting parts, of which he already had five years television experience as a semi-regular on the weekly sitcom Just Jimmy.

As he became better known, he was gradually offered more varied TV work. His subsequent television appearances included the police drama in Z-Cars (1973) and Barlow at Large, and comedy on ITV in Bless This House (1974). In 1975, he had a starring role as George Bradshaw in the short-lived comedy series Rule Britannia!.

In 1979, Melody appeared in the John Schlesinger film Yanks opposite Rachel Roberts, playing the husband of the terminally ill Roberts. The following year, he appeared in Little Lord Fauntleroy as Kimsey. He also played Station Sergeant Billy Machin in the comedy series The Nesbitts Are Coming, and followed that up in 1981 by appearing as Archie in the comedy series The Incredible Mr Tanner. He was always most effective in comedy roles; however, from 1981 to 1983, he appeared as the Chief, John Nettles's boss in the first six episodes of the BBC police series Bergerac. On Channel 4's opening night, Melody appeared in Walter, alongside Ian McKellen in the title role.

In the 1983 Last of the Summer Wine special "Getting Sam Home", John Comer's voice was badly affected by illness, so his lines were re-recorded by Melody. Comer died six weeks after the broadcast.

Melody's first appearance in Emmerdale Farm came in 1983, when he played Nicholas Martin. In 1985, he appeared in the drama series The Winning Streak, and in 1986 he played Dave Sharkey in the sitcom Jossy's Giants. In 1990, he appeared as the husband of Patricia Routledge in Missing Persons, which was a feature-length pilot for Hetty Wainthropp Investigates.

During the 1990s, Melody also appeared in an episode of the period drama Heartbeat. The episode, entitled "We're all Allies Really", saw Melody play the character of Walter Openshaw.

Melody made a second appearance in Emmerdale in 1998, this time as the farmer Jed Outhwaite. In 2000, he made a fourth appearance on Coronation Street as the MC at a ballroom dance competition in Blackpool, which the characters of Norris Cole and Vera Duckworth were entered into.

Melody appeared in the television drama film Shipman in 2002, as Len, a patient who survived the real-life homicidal doctor Harold Shipman, who was played by James Bolam. Melody also appeared in the drama A Good Thief as Alfie, as well as a television advertising campaign for McDonald's. His last television appearance was in 2003 on Last of the Summer Wine.

Throughout his broadcasting, career he continued to work live in summer season (at holiday camps such as Butlin's, and in seaside resorts such as Blackpool and Skegness). He also worked in pantomime.

== Personal life ==
Melody's first marriage was dissolved; he had four children with his first wife. He met his second wife, Maggie, when they were both performing in pantomime in Skegness. They made their home in Bispham, Blackpool, which he claimed was her home town, where he spent the rest of his life. Melody would say about living in Bispham, "Other actors can have London. I don't like it there, can't stand the trains, the noise, the hassle. Home is here." However, the real reason they lived there was not unconnected with the fact that Melody was in a long-term professional double act with Jimmy Clitheroe, who lived a five-minute walk from their front door. Offscreen, Melody was a shy unassuming man, who rarely gave interviews and who shunned the "show business scene".

Melody had four children: three sons and a daughter from his first marriage.

== Death ==
Melody died in a nursing home from cancer after a short illness on 26 June 2008, aged 85. His funeral was held at Carleton Crematorium, Blackpool, Lancashire on 3 July.

== Filmography ==
=== Television ===
Year	Title	Role
1957	Be Soon	
1964–68	Just Jimmy	Jim Moreton (semi-regular appearances for 5 years)
1965	Coronation Street	Coach driver
1965	Coronation Street	Taxi driver
1968	Coronation Street	Harold Eaton
1969	Parkin's Patch	Post Office Man
1970	Steptoe and Son	Milkman
1970	ITV Saturday Night Theatre	Jack Scott
1971	Some Matters of Little Consequence	
1972	Home and Away	Godrey
1972	Play for Today	Official Receiver
1972	Sykes	Milkman
1972	New Scotland Yard	Charles Change
1972	Love Story	Stan Truscott
1972	Public Eye	Harry
1973	Z-Cars	Brazendale
1973	Hadleigh	Walter Unwin
1974	Barlow at Large	Roger Tober
1974	Justice	Charlie Thompson
1974	Marked Personal	Steve Morris
1974	Bless This House	Owen
1974	Play for Today	Detective
1975	Sadie, It's Cold Outside	Bob
1975	The Main Chance	Sammy Dayton
1975	Rule Britannia	George Bradshaw
1975	Down the 'Gate	Len Peacock
1978	George and Mildred	Ernest Groves
1979	Turtle's Progress	Colour Sergeant Arnold
1980	The Nesbitts Are Coming	Station Sergeant Billy Machin
1980	Juliet Bravo	Rodney Maskill
1980	Little Lord Fauntleroy	Kimsey
1980	Play for Today (The Flipside of Dominick Hide)	Harry
1981	The Incredible Mr Tanner	Archie
1981–1983	Bergerac	Chief
1982	The Chinese Detective	Mr Morris
1982	Walter	Mr Hingley
1983	Crown Court	
1983	Let There Be Love	Steven
1983	Emmerdale Farm	Nicholas Martin
1983	Last of the Summer Wine	Sid's Voice Stand In
1985	The Winning Streak	Matt Hutton
1986	Jossy's Giants	Dave Sharkey
1988	The Nature of the Beast	Chunder
1989	All Creatures Great and Small	Mr Skipton
1989	Boon	Mr Brown
1990	Missing Persons	Robert Wainthropp
1990	Stay Lucky	Uncle Horace
1991	Plaza Patrol	Painter
1992	Moon and Son	Bill Atley
1992	Rumpole of the Bailey	Saggers
1994	Casualty	Brian Miller
1995	Heartbeat	Walter Openshaw
1996	Dalziel and Pascoe	Harold Lapping
1998	Emmerdale	Jed Outhwaite
1999	Where the Heart Is	Hughie Burridge
2000	Coronation Street	MC
2002	A Good Thief	Alfie
2003	Last of the Summer Wine	Landlord

=== Film ===
Year	Title	Role
1977	The Stick Up	Tall Cop
1979	Yanks	Jim Moreton
1980	Little Lord Fauntleroy	Kimsey
1985	Mr. Love	Ferris
1985	Invitation to the Wedding	Vine
1985	Turtle Diary	Garage Attendant with Bucket
1987	Pretorius	Huizinga
2002	Shipman	Len Fallows
