= Lucky 7 (TV series) =

- Genre: Drama
- Based on: The Syndicate by Kay Mellor
- Developed by: David Zabel; Jason Richman
- Starring: Summer Bishil; Lorraine Bruce; Alexandra Castillo; Christine Evangelista; Stephen Louis Grush; Matt Long; Anastasia Phillips; Luis Antonio Ramos; Isiah Whitlock, Jr.
- Composers: Bob Thiele Jr.; Paul Koch
- Country of origin: United States
- Original language: English
- No. of seasons: 1
- No. of episodes: 8 (6 unaired)

Production
- Executive producers: David Zabel; Jason Richman; Justin Falvey; Darryl Frank; Paul McGuigan; Steven Spielberg
- Cinematography: Fabian Wagner
- Production companies: Remainder Men; The Beekeeper's Apprentice Productions; Rollem Productions; Amblin Television; ABC Studios

Original release
- Network: ABC
- Release: September 24 – October 1, 2013

Lucky 7 is an American drama television series that ran from September 24, to October 1, 2013, on ABC as part of the 2013–14 American television season. The one-hour series is based on the British television show The Syndicate, which was created by Kay Mellor. Steven Spielberg phoned Kay Mellor to tell her how much he loved the original, and a few months later became an executive producer on Lucky 7. ABC placed a series order on May 10, 2013. The pilot episode earned only 1.3 rating in the 18- to 49-year-old demographic, making Lucky 7 the lowest rated fall drama premiere in ABC history.

On October 4, 2013, ABC canceled the series due to low ratings. It was the first show of the 2013–14 season to be canceled.

On September 25, 2014, ABC released all the episodes produced on iTunes, which were a total of eight.

== Premise ==
A group of seven gas station employees in Queens, New York City, play the lottery every week and dream about what they would do with the winnings. When they do finally hit the jackpot, the coworkers learn that money may solve some problems, but it creates new ones.

== Cast and characters ==
=== Main cast ===
- Summer Bishil as Samira Rajpur
- Lorraine Bruce as Denise Dibinsky
- Alexandra Castillo as Bianca Clemente
- Christine Evangelista as Mary Lavecchia
- Stephen Louis Grush as Nicky Korzak
- Matt Long as Matt Korzak
- Anastasia Phillips as Leanne Maxwell
- Luis Antonio Ramos as Antonio Clemente
- Isiah Whitlock, Jr. as Bob Harris

=== Recurring cast ===
- Stephen Rider as Eric Mosely
- Kim Roberts as Gloria

== Episodes ==
No.	Title	Directed by	Written by	Original release date	U.S. viewers (millions)
1	"Pilot"	Paul McGuigan	David Zabel & Jason Richman	September 24, 2013	4.43
2	"Inside Job"	Stephen Cragg	David Zabel & Jason Richman	October 1, 2013	2.62
3	"Cable Guy"	Stephen Cragg	David Zabel & Barbie Kligman	N/A	N/A
4	"Pay Day"	Dan Lerner	Michael J. Cinquemani & Jason Richman	N/A	N/A
5	"All In"	Stephen Herek	Shannon Goss	N/A	N/A
6	"Gold Star, Inc."	Colin Bucksey	David A. Weinstein	N/A	N/A
7	"Movin' On Up..."	Matthew Penn	Alex Metcalf	N/A	N/A
8	"Five More Minutes"	J. Miller Tobin	Barbie Kligman & David Zabel	N/A	N/A

== Reception ==
The series has a 29% critics' rating on Rotten Tomatoes based on 31 reviews. Kristin dos Santos of E! Online said the show is not unique enough to make it memorable. David Hinckley of the New York Daily News gave the show 3 out of 5 stars.
