= Elevator Game =

- Theatrical release poster
- Directed by: Rebekah McKendry
- Written by: David Ian McKendry, Travis Seppala
- Produced by: Stefan Brunner, Ed Elbert, James Norrie
- Starring: Gino Anania; Megan Best; Alec Carlos; Nazariy Demkowicz; Samantha Halas; Madison MacIsaac; Verity Marks; Liam Stewart-Kanigan
- Cinematography: Brad Crawford
- Edited by: Chad Tremblay
- Music by: Kevon Cronin
- Production companies: Buffalo Gal Pictures; Head Gear Films; Manitoba Film and Music; Metrol Technology
- Distributed by: AMP International; Front Row Filmed Entertainment; M2 Films; Movie Cloud
- Release date: February 7, 2023 (United States)
- Running time: 94 minutes
- Country: United States
- Language: English

Elevator Game is a 2023 American horror film directed by Rebekah McKendry and starring Gino Anania, Megan Best, Alec Carlos, Nazariy Demkowicz, Samantha Halas, Madison MacIsaac, Verity Marks and Liam Stewart-Kanigan. Shudder released the film 15 September 2023. Based on the online phenomenon of the same name, the film concentrates on a story about a mysterious ritual that may lead the performer into another, dark dimension.

== Plot ==
Ryan is an intern with a group of streamers, Chloe, Kris, Matty, Izzy, and Kevin, who investigate paranormal legends. During his first day, he suggests that the team investigate a local building where a young girl named Becki is rumored to have gone missing after playing the "elevator game". He declines to tell them that Becki is his sister and he only joined the group in hopes of gaining answers through their investigation. In order to play the game, the participants must travel to specific floors in a set order, and, when they are on the fifth floor, must keep their eyes shut until the doors close. If successful, they will enter the spirit realm, but if they fail, they will be torn apart by the Fifth Floor Woman, which is what happened to Becki.

The team films themselves undergoing the challenge, only to get interrupted. They also lose half the footage due to recording anomalies caused by the ritual. Kris refuses to re-do the task and suggests that they abandon the idea. Angered, Ryan reveals his identity and the knowledge that Kris refused because it would reveal his inappropriate relationship with Becki, who was underage. Disgusted, the team separates and the Fifth Floor Woman kills Kris. Izzy and Kevin perform the elevator game again and are killed by the Fifth Floor Woman. Ryan also performs the ritual, resulting in him visiting the spirit world. He is chased back to the human world.

In the office, Ryan and Chloe encounter a terrified Matty, who has also encountered the woman. Chloe discovered that the woman is the vengeful spirit of a sorority pledge Allie, who was killed by a hazing prank. The sorority had left her in an elevator shaft, where she was accidentally crushed. The only way to stop her is to repeat the ritual. The Fifth Floor Woman kills Matty. Chloe and Ryan repeat the ritual but are unsuccessful as Chloe is killed while Ryan becomes permanently trapped in the spirit world. The film ends with a social media influencer entering the elevator to make a video about the team's disappearance.

== Cast ==
- Gino Anania as Ryan Keaton
- Megan Best as Becki Keaton
- Alec Carlos as Kris Russo
- Nazariy Demkowicz as Matthew "Matty" Davis
- Samantha Halas as 5th Floor Woman / Allie McCormick
- Madison MacIsaac as Izzy Simpson
- Verity Marks as Chloe Young
- Liam Stewart-Kanigan as Kevin
- Adam Hurtig as Businessman
- Darren Wall as Security Guard
- Bradley Sawatzky as Café Bar Host
- Hazel Wallace as Teenage Girl

== Reception ==
On the review aggregator website Rotten Tomatoes, 36% of 11 critics' reviews are positive, with an average rating of 4.8/10. Metacritic, which uses a weighted average, assigned the film a score of 47 out of 100, based on 5 critics, indicating "mixed or average" reviews.

Nick Allen of RogerEbert.com praised the film for its characters while also criticizing it for its flow, pointing out that "even the characters comment on how going from one floor, then up to another, then down, and then up to another, etc., is almost a joke." Phuong Le of The Guardian was also critical, as they noted that the film's premise was "ripe with potential for world-building details and creative designs, but there is little visual flair on show here."

Tyler Nichols of JoBlo.com panned the film, citing that the characters were unlikeable and that "It’s a constant source of frustration since movies like this NEED likable characters. Otherwise, who cares who the ghost is going after?" Matt Donato of Paste added, "Elevator Game is better suited for horror fans who might not even consider themselves horror fans (yet)."
