= Matt Long =

American actor (born 1980)

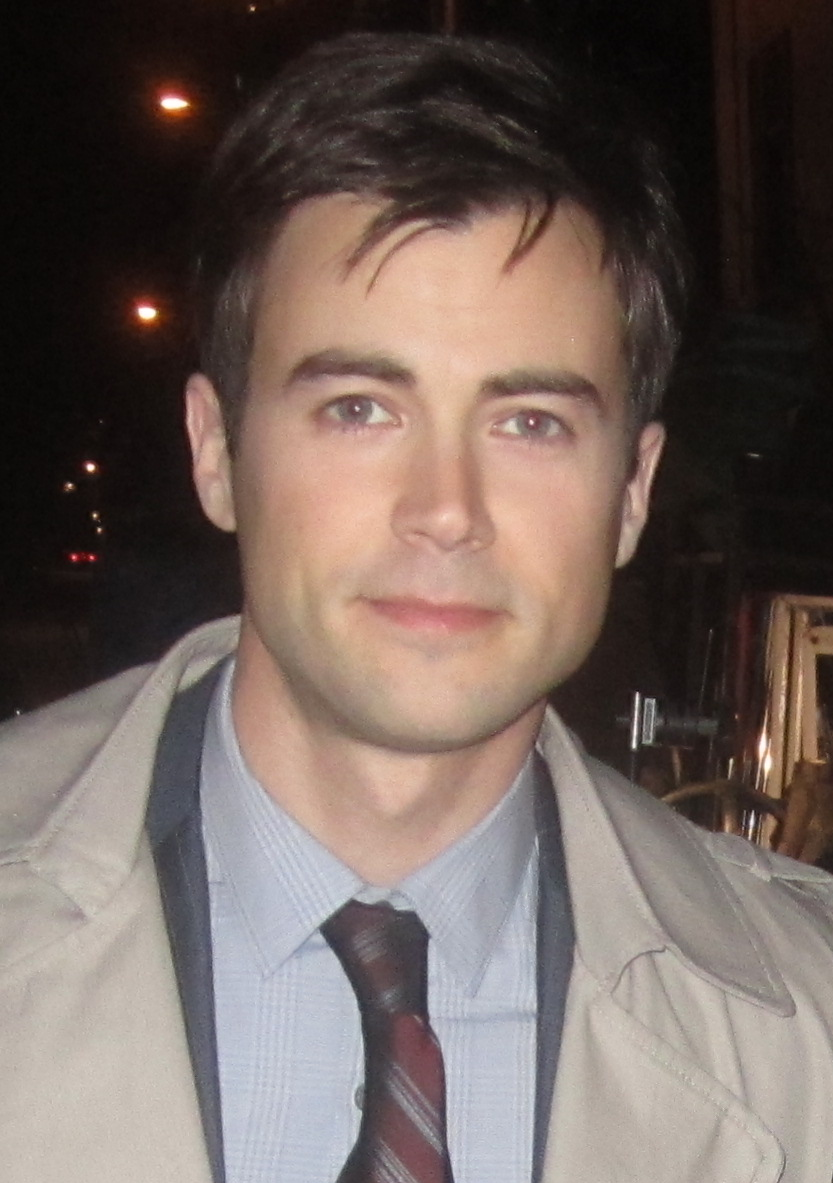
- Long in 2011
- Born: May 18, 1980 (age 46); Winchester, Kentucky, U.S.
- Occupation: Actor
- Years active: 2001–present
- Spouse: Lora Chaffins (m. 2005)
- Children: 2

Matthew Long (born May 18, 1980) is an American actor. He is best known for playing Ezekiel Landon in the NBC/Netflix sci fi drama Manifest (2019–2023), and his roles in the television series Jack & Bobby (2004–2005), and the films Ghost Rider (2007) and Sydney White (2007).

== Life and career ==
Long was born in Winchester, Kentucky, to an insurance salesman father and an assistant teacher mother. He has one younger sibling, Zach. He attended Western Kentucky University where he met his wife, Lora. He was also a member of Sigma Alpha Epsilon fraternity. After graduation, Long moved to New York City, where he worked as an actor in various theaters. In 2004, he was cast as a lead on The WB drama series Jack & Bobby, and later starred in several TV pilots and appeared in movies, including Ghost Rider and Sydney White.

Long played the lead role in the ABC drama series The Deep End in 2010. He also had the recurring role of Joey Baird in the AMC drama series Mad Men, and in 2012 was cast in the ABC pilot Gilded Lilys, created and produced by Shonda Rhimes. Rhimes later cast him in her medical drama Private Practice in a recurring role as Dr. James Peterson. In 2013, Long was cast as a lead in another ABC drama series, Lucky 7.

In 2019, Long appeared as the recurring character Zeke Landon during the first season of the NBC drama Manifest, and was promoted to the main cast for season 2.

== Filmography ==
=== Film ===
Year	Title	Role	Notes
2001	The Greatest Adventure of My Life	Private Nutsack	
2007	Ghost Rider	Young Johnny Blaze	
2007	Sydney White	Tyler Prince	
2009	Homecoming	Mike Donaldson	
2018	All the Creatures Were Stirring	Eric	Segment: "Dash Away All"

=== Television ===
Year	Title	Role	Notes
2004–2005	Jack & Bobby	Jack McCallister	Main role Nominated – Prism Award for Best Performance in a Drama Series
2006	Secrets of a Small Town	Chad Wilson	Episode: "Pilot"
2006	Deceit	Dave Ford	TV movie
2010	The Deep End	Dylan Hewitt	Main role
2010	Mad Men	Joey Baird	Recurring role Nominated – Screen Actors Guild Award for Outstanding Performance by an Ensemble in a Drama Series
2011	Love Bites	Matt	Episodes: "Keep on Truckin'", "Sky High", "Modern Plagues"
2011	17th Precinct	Jimmy Travers	TV pilot
2012	Gilded Lilys	John Kidd	TV pilot
2012	The Newsroom	Brad	Episode: "The 112th Congress"
2012–2013	Private Practice	Dr. James Peterson	Recurring role
2013–2014	Lucky 7	Matt Korzak	Main role
2015	Helix	Dr. Kyle Sommers	Main role (season 2)
2017	Graves	Jesse Enright	Episode: "The Opposite of People"
2018	Timeless	Ryan Millerson	Guest role
2018	Christmas Joy	Ben Andrews	TV movie
2018	#Fashionvictim	Det. Stephen Hopper	TV movie
2019–2023	Manifest	Ezekiel "Zeke" Landon	Recurring role (season 1); Main role (seasons 2–4)
2024	Tracker	US Marshal Jeremy Boyd	Episode: "Out of the Past"
2026	The Stars Between Us	Malcolm	Hallmark Movies
