= Rebekah McKendry =

American director

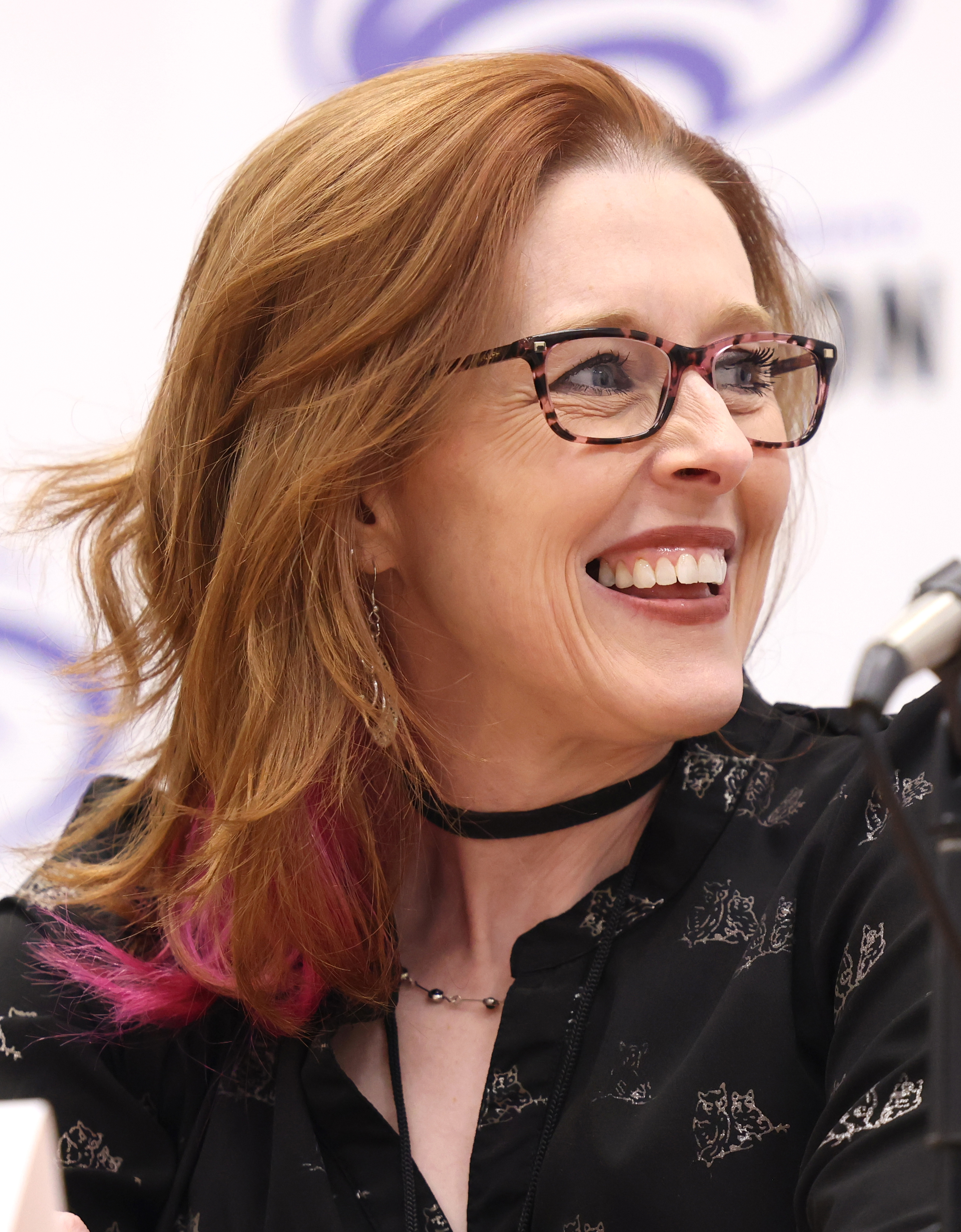
- McKendry in 2025
- Born: Rebekah McKendry; October 10, 1979 (age 47); Winchester, Virginia
- Occupations: Director, Producer, Film Journalist, Professor
- Years active: 2005–Present
- Notable work: Tales of Halloween (2015), All the Creatures Were Stirring (2017)
- Spouse: David Ian McKendry (m. 2003)
- Children: 2

Rebekah McKendry (born October 8, 1980 in Winchester, Virginia) is an American film director, producer, film journalist, and academic. She is best known for her work on Tales of Halloween (2015) and All the Creatures Were Stirring (2017).

== Career ==
In 2005, McKendry joined the team at Fangoria Entertainment and was heavily involved in project development and production as Director of Marketing. In 2015, she left Fangoria to work for Blumhouse Productions, becoming the Editor-in-Chief of Blumhouse.com.

Along with Elric Kane and Rob Galluzzo, McKendry hosted the Killer POV podcast, which ran for 140 episodes on Geeknation. In 2016, the team moved to Blumhouse.com and were joined by Ryan Turek to form the Shock Waves podcast.

McKendry co-directed her first feature film with her husband David Ian McKendry titled All the Creatures Were Stirring (2017) starring Constance Wu, Jonathan Kite, Amanda Fuller, and Brea Grant.

McKendry is currently a professor at USC School of Cinematic Arts.

In 2021, McKendry co-wrote a horror film reboot of the 2000 film Bring It On with writer Dana Schwartz. The film was produced by SYFY.

== Education ==
McKendry has a doctorate focused in Media Studies from Virginia Commonwealth University.

== Filmography ==
=== Film ===
Year	Title	Director	Writer	Producer
2018	All the Creatures Were Stirring	Yes	Yes	Yes
2019	Psycho Granny	Yes	No	No
2022	Glorious	Yes	No	No
2023	Elevator Game	Yes	No	No
2026	Sundown	Yes	No	

Actress

Year	Title	Role
2015	Tales of Halloween	Mother

Executive producer

- The Dead Thing (2024)

=== Short film ===
Year	Title	Director	Writer	Producer	Notes
2011	Zombie's Day Out	No	No	Yes	Role: Co-Worker
2011	Feather	No	No	Yes	also choreographer
2012	The Dump	Yes	Story	Yes	
2013	The Barista	Yes	No	Yes	
2013	Scary Mask	No	No	Yes	
2013	Witches Brew	Yes	No	No	
2014	Found	Yes	No	Yes	
2015	Zombies Gone Wild!	No	No	Yes	Documentary short
2015	Eli Roth on Your Vice and the Genius of Martino	No	No	Yes	Documentary short
2015	Exquisite Corpse	Yes	Yes	No	
2020	Separation	Yes	Yes	No	

Executive producer

- Wednesday the 13th (2013)

=== Television ===
Year	Title	Writer	Producer	Notes
2011	Zombies March	No	Executive	TV movie
2012-2013	Blood and Guts with Scott Ian	No	Yes	
2012	The Double Life of Deanna Sinclair	Story	No	1 episode
2012	Inside Horror	Yes	No	1 episode
2021	2021 Fangoria Chainsaw Awards	No	Yes	TV special
2022	Bring It On: Cheer or Die	Yes	No	TV movie

== Awards and nominations ==
Year	Festival	Award	Nominated work	Result
2018	Chattanooga Film Festival	Audience Choice Award	All the Creatures Were Stirring	Won
2018	Rondo Hatton Classic Horror Awards	Best Independent Film	All the Creatures Were Stirring	Nominated
