= The Visit (TV series) =

British sitcom (BBC Three, 2007)

- Genre: Comedy
- Created by: Tony Burgess
- Written by: Tony Burgess
- Directed by: Tony Dow
- Starring: Iain McKee; Steve Edge; John Henshaw; Vincent Davies; Stephen Walters
- Opening theme: "How Does It Feel?" by Slade
- Country of origin: United Kingdom
- Original language: English
- No. of series: 1
- No. of episodes: 7

Production
- Executive producer: Kenton Allen
- Producer: John Rushton
- Editor: Simon Reglar
- Running time: Approximately 30 minutes

Original release
- Network: BBC Three
- Release: 15 July – 26 August 2007

The Visit is a British television programme written by stand-up comedian Tony Burgess. Starring Iain McKee and Steve Edge, the series revolves around the visiting room of the HMP Radford Hill, a category C prison.

The BBC revealed The Visit is part of a series trilogy with I'm with Stupid and Thieves Like Us.

== Plot outline ==
Stray sheep, dodgy drug deals and snatched conjugal rights are common, as the inmates of HMP Radford Hill are reunited with family and friends on their weekly visits. The series follows two prisoners as they entertain visitors on a weekly basis. Michael, in prison for a jewellery robbery he didn't commit, is awaiting the outcome of his appeal. His weekly visits consist of his father, his Nan, and his younger brother Stevie. Clint, a gambling addict, suffers from a lack of social grace and the interesting habits of his nine-year-old son. His weekly visits consist of his wife and infant children.

== Characters ==
=== Michael ===
Played by Iain McKee: Michael has taken the rap for a jewellery robbery. He refused to grass the other robbers, meaning he is the one to get locked up while the real culprits remain free, one of which was his brother, Stevie. However to save his brother from the prison sentence Michael took the fall for him.

=== Clint ===
Played by Steve Edge: Gambling addict Clint is desperate to prove his machismo but what chance has he got when his wife – the long-suffering Bev – does not take him seriously. His unseen nine-year-old son Jamie is constant source of comedy and anxiety (at least on Clint's part) with ongoing references to his unhealthy interests of dolls, skipping and stage musicals. Clint has an unfortunate ability to say the wrong thing at the wrong time and upset those around him.

=== Splodge Costello ===
Played by Stephen Walters: Mancunian Splodge is campaigning for the right to additional toilet paper rolls, which landed him in a stint of solitary confinement. Most of the prison inmates and staff are afraid of him, and he knows it. Splodge spends most of his visiting time waiting for his girlfriend, Zoe, who is habitually late, and harassing the other inmates.

=== Blind Pete ===
Played by Vincent Davies: Pete, or "Blind Pete" as he's known within the prison, uses his disability to his advantage in any way that he can. Many of the other prisoners suspect that all is not what it seems and that Pete may actually be able to see.

=== Brian ===
Played by John Henshaw: Michael's father and a local taxi driver, Brian drives the family to the prison each week for their visit. A bit of a complainer with an unhealthy obsession with speed bump, he's still a loyal family man.

=== Stevie ===
Played by Craig Fitzpatrick: Michael's younger brother, Stevie is not too concerned with anything but women and weed. During visits he likes to wind his father and brother up while convincing his Nan to pay for anything he thinks he needs.

=== Nana ===
Played by Beatrice Kelley: If any soul needs saving, Nana knows it's her grandson. She insists on sending Michael every religious icon she can find, has made friends with all of the local Catholic Priests, and thinks that Father Kane can solve any problem.

=== Bev ===
Played by Naomi Radcliffe: Clint's long-suffering wife, Bev spends much of her time campaigning for better playground facilities in the visiting room for her twins. Loyal, rational, and calm, she is often frustrated with her husband's gambling on the inside while she struggles to make ends meet on the outside.

=== Zoe ===
Played by Rebecca Richamond: Splodge's girlfriend and the mother of his child, Zoe often misses visits or is late. She turns the heads of most of the other inmates, much to the dismay of their girlfriends and wives.

=== Officer Mark Bamford ===
Played by Darren Tighe: Prison Officer Bamford likes to keep a tight ship. However the harder he tries the more of a fool he makes himself look. Bamford is usually at the end of fellow prison officer, Russell's jokes, with Bamford always calling Russell a twat behind his back once he has become the butt of the joke.

=== Officer Russell ===
Played by Neil Bell: Crunchies are the most important thing in Officer Russel's day. Relaxed and focused on chocolate, he spends most of his day wondering how much time is left in his shift.

=== Officer Rachel ===
Played by Angel Coulby: Well liked by the prisoners due to her wit and sarcasm, Officer Rachel is both good at her job and willing to put the other guards in their place.

== Cast ==
- Iain McKee ... Michael
- John Henshaw ... Dad
- Craig Fitzpatrick ... Stevie
- Beatrice Kelly ... Nana
- Steve Edge ... Clint
- Naomi Radcliffe ... Bev
- Angel Coulby ... Officer Rachael
- Darren Tighe ... Officer Mark Bamford
- Neil Bell ... Officer Russell
- Vincent Davies ... Pete
- Stephen Walters (Credited as Stephen Martin Walters)... Splodge
- Rebecca Richmond... Zoe

== Episodes ==
No. overall	No. in series	Title	Written by	Original release date
1	1	"Episode 1"	Tony Burgess	15 July 2007
Pete gets a pleasant surprise from his unexpected visitor, while Nana recounts the story of Father O'Kane and his chapati. Clint makes an unsuccessful attempt at playing the hardnut of the prison.
2	2	"Episode 2"	Tony Burgess	22 July 2007
Splodge Costello has completed his dirty protest in solitary, but celebrations are restrained. Michael maintains his innocence and pursues his appeal. Clint is happy to show off his pumped up muscles to Bev.
3	3	"Episode 3"	Tony Burgess	29 July 2007
A sheep has mysteriously got into Radford's visiting room and Officer Bamford has taken drastic action to solve the problem. The inmates enjoy the drama on banned mobile telephones, but how do they keep them hidden from the officers?
4	4	"Episode 4"	Tony Burgess	5 August 2007
The creche has been furnished with new toys, much to the delight of Bev and Clint. At last Michael's solicitor has arrived, but he is urged to apologise for a crime that he insists he did not commit.
5	5	"Episode 5"	Dave Nicholls	12 August 2007
Clint's brother arrives at the prison with a consignment to appease Lipstick Dave, and Clint's status plummets even further. A spot drug test on the inmates brings an extra worry to Michael and the family.
6	6	"Episode 6"	Tony Burgess	19 August 2007
At last someone has come to fix the CCTV cameras, and Officer Bamford finds a spark of attraction in her. It's Clint's birthday and his son Jamie has a special surprise.
7	7	"Episode 7"	Jim Poyser	26 August 2007
Clint has discovered Buddhism, Russell plucks up the courage to ask Rachael out and Pete has success with his internet date. But has Michael's appeal been successful?
