= Just Us (TV series) =

1992 British TV children's series

- Genre: Children's; Drama
- Created by: Kay Mellor (as deviser)
- Written by: Kay Mellor; Chris Thompson
- Directed by: Chris Thompson
- Starring: Kay Mellor; William Chubb; Dan Riley; Sarah Wheatley; Sarah Yates
- Music by: Christopher Norton
- Country of origin: United Kingdom
- Original language: English
- No. of series: 3
- No. of episodes: 24

Production
- Executive producer: Chris Jelley
- Producers: Robert Gabriel; Amanda Silvester
- Production locations: Leeds, West Yorkshire, England, UK
- Editor: Phil Cooke
- Running time: 26 minutes
- Production company: Yorkshire Television

Original release
- Network: ITV (CITV)
- Release: 18 February 1992 – 11 March 1994

Just Us is a British children's family drama television series was written and created by Kay Mellor, it was originally aired on ITV as part of the children's programming block CITV and ran for three series and twenty-four episodes between 18 February 1992 and 11 March 1994. The show was produced by Yorkshire Television for the ITV network.

== Plot summary ==
The series follows the lives and dynamics of the Holdsworth family. Moving away from traditional, straight forward sitcoms, the series combined family drama with Mellor's signature writing style, occasionally delving into more serious, emotional and unexpected territory. It was known for balancing heartfelt family dynamics with nuanced character.

== Cast ==
The main cast includes:

- Kay Mellor as Jenny Holdsworth
- William Chubb as Steve Holdsworth (Series 1–2)
- Dan Riley as Marcus Clarkson (Series 2–3)
- Sarah Wheatley as Katie Holdsworth (Series 2–3)
- Sarah Yates as Laura Holdsworth (Series 2–3)

== Episodes ==
=== Series overview ===
| Series | Episodes | Originally released | |
| Series | Episodes | First released | Last released |
|---|---|---|---|
| 1 | 7 | 18 February 1992 | 31 March 1992 |
| 2 | 7 | 19 February 1993 | 2 April 1993 |
| 3 | 10 | 7 January 1994 | 11 March 1994 |

=== Series 1 (1992) ===
Episodes aired on CITV on Tuesdays at 16:40.

| No. overall | No. in series | Title | Original release date |
|---|---|---|---|
| 1 | 1 | "Part 1" | 18 February 1992 |
| 2 | 2 | "Part 2" | 25 February 1992 |
| 3 | 3 | "Part 3" | 3 March 1992 |
| 4 | 4 | "Part 4" | 10 March 1992 |
| 5 | 5 | "Part 5" | 17 March 1992 |
| 6 | 6 | "Part 6" | 24 March 1992 |
| 7 | 7 | "Part 7" | 31 March 1992 |

=== Series 2 (1993) ===
Episodes aired on CITV on Fridays at 16:40.

| No. overall | No. in series | Title | Original release date |
|---|---|---|---|
| 8 | 1 | "Part 1" | 19 February 1993 |
| 9 | 2 | "Part 2" | 26 February 1993 |
| 10 | 3 | "Part 3" | 5 March 1993 |
| 11 | 4 | "Part 4" | 12 March 1993 |
| 12 | 5 | "Part 5" | 19 March 1993 |
| 13 | 6 | "Part 6" | 26 March 1993 |
| 14 | 7 | "Part 7" | 2 April 1993 |

=== Series 3 (1994) ===
Episodes aired on CITV on Fridays at 16:40.

| No. overall | No. in series | Title | Original release date |
|---|---|---|---|
| 15 | 1 | "Part 1" | 7 January 1994 |
| 16 | 2 | "Part 2" | 14 January 1994 |
| 17 | 3 | "Part 3" | 21 January 1994 |
| 18 | 4 | "Part 4" | 28 January 1994 |
| 19 | 5 | "Part 5" | 4 February 1994 |
| 20 | 6 | "Part 6" | 11 February 1994 |
| 21 | 7 | "Part 7" | 18 February 1994 |
| 22 | 8 | "Part 8" | 25 February 1994 |
| 23 | 9 | "Part 9" | 4 March 1994 |
| 24 | 10 | "Part 10" | 11 March 1994 |

== Home media ==
Notably, the whole series was never been commercially released on DVD or VHS.
