= The Nesbitts Are Coming =

1980 British TV comedy series

- Genre: Comedy
- Written by: Dick Sharples
- Directed by: Ronnie Baxter
- Starring: Clive Swift
- Country of origin: United Kingdom
- Original language: English
- No. of series: 1
- No. of episodes: 6

Production
- Producer: Ronnie Baxter
- Running time: 30 minutes
- Production company: Yorkshire Television

Original release
- Network: ITV
- Release: 17 April – 22 May 1980

The Nesbitts Are Coming is a British comedy television series which first aired on ITV in 1980. The unusual comedy, produced by Yorkshire Television, depicts a singing criminal family.

== Main cast ==
- Clive Swift as Ernie Nesbitt
- Maggie Jones as Mrs. Nesbitt
- Deirdre Costello as Marlene Nesbitt
- John Price as Len Nesbitt
- Christian Rodska as Tom Nesbitt
- Ken Jones as Detective Sergeant Arnold Nixon
- Tony Melody as Station Sergeant Billy Machin
- John Clive as PC Emlyn Harris
- Patsy Rowlands as WPC Kitty Naylor
- Arthur White as PC Crowther

== Bibliography ==
- Howard Maxford. Hammer Complete: The Films, the Personnel, the Company. McFarland, 2018.
