= The Syndicate =

British television drama series

- Series 4 title card
- Genre: Drama
- Created by: Kay Mellor
- Written by: Kay Mellor
- Opening theme: "All or Nothing" by Small Faces (series 1–2); "All or Nothing" by Scars on 45 (series 3); "The Gambler" by David Nowakowsi and Rising Fever (series 4)
- Composer: Hal Lindes
- Country of origin: United Kingdom
- Original language: English
- No. of series: 4
- No. of episodes: 23

Production
- Executive producers: Polly Hill; Nicola Shindler
- Production locations: Yorkshire, England
- Running time: 60 minutes
- Production company: Rollem Productions

Original release
- Network: BBC One
- Release: 27 March 2012 – 4 May 2021

The Syndicate is a British television drama series. It was written by Kay Mellor and is broadcast on BBC One. It sees five members of a betting syndicate win the lottery. Each series follows a different syndicate. The first series is set in a Leeds supermarket; the second, a public hospital in Bradford; the third, a crumbling stately home near Scarborough; and the fourth is set between a dog kennel in Yorkshire and Monaco.

The theme tune for the first two series of the show is "All or Nothing", by the Small Faces. For the third series, a cover version of the same song performed by Scars on 45 was used. The score is composed by guitarist Hal Lindes from Dire Straits. The theme tune for Season four of the show is a cover of "The Gambler" performed by David Nowakowski featuring Rising Fever. Series 4 premiered on BBC One on 30 March 2021.

The series was remade in America as Lucky 7 for ABC and ran for only one series.

== Cast ==
- Lorraine Bruce as Denise Simpson is the only cast member to appear in every series. In series 1 she won the lottery; her character was reprised as the Lottery Winners Adviser in all subsequent series. Lorraine was also invited to play Denise in the USA version of the show. In "Lucky 7" Denise Simpson becomes Denise Dibinksy, a native of Queens, New York.

=== Series 1 ===
- Timothy Spall as Bob Davies
- Lorraine Bruce as Denise Simpson
- Matthew Lewis as Jamie Bradley
- Joanna Page as Leanne Powell
- Matthew McNulty as Stuart Bradley
- Amy Beth Hayes as Amy Cartwright
- John Paul Hurley as DCI Newell
- Katherine Dow Blyton as Annie Davies
- Kai Owen as Gareth Powell
- Anthony Lewis as Peter Davies
- Clare Higgins as Joyce Bradley
- Lily Pickering as Stacey Powell

=== Series 2 ===
- Siobhan Finneran as Mandy Atkinson
- Alison Steadman as Rose Wilson
- Mark Addy as Alan Walters
- Natalie Gavin as Becky Atkinson
- Jimi Mistry as Tom Bedford
- Steven Waddington as Steve Atkinson
- Roma Christensen as Reah Atkinson
- Sally Rogers as Helen Dolan
- Karl Davies as Luke Summers

=== Series 3 ===
- Elizabeth Berrington as Dawn Stevenson
- Melanie Hill as Julie Travers
- Lenny Henry as Godfrey Watson
- Cara Theobold as Sarah Travers
- Richard Rankin as Sean McGary/McAdams
- Anthony Andrews as Lord Hazelwood
- Alice Krige as Lady Hazelwood
- Sam Phillips as Spencer Cavendish
- Daisy Head as Amy Stevenson
- Kieran O'Brien as Andy Stevenson
- Polly Walker as DI Lynn Baker
- Rob Kendrick as Nick Harrison
- Elaine C. Smith as Valerie Hardcastle
- Poppy Lee Friar as Mary Campbell

=== Series 4 ===
- Katherine Rose Morley as Keeley Sanderson
- Taj Atwal as Roxy Varma
- Liberty Hobbs as Gemma Hepworth
- Kieran Urquhart as Jake Thackery
- Kym Marsh as Donna Sanderson
- Ruben Reuter as Shane Sanderson
- Mark Benton as Graham Woods
- Emily Head as Colette Andrews
- Neil Morrissey as Frank Stevenson
- Gaynor Faye as Cheryl Armitage
- Rita May as Nanna
- Joe Sugg as Sam
- Katie McGlynn as Georgina Clarke

== Episodes ==
=== Series overview ===
Series	Episodes	Originally released		Average UK viewers (millions)
Series	Episodes	First released	Last released	Average UK viewers (millions)
1	5	27 March 2012	24 April 2012	6.01
2	6	19 March 2013	23 April 2013	6.28
3	6	2 June 2015	7 July 2015	6.67
4	6	30 March 2021	4 May 2021	3.79

=== Series 1 (2012) ===
In the first series the syndicate consists of workmates in a small local supermarket located in Leeds, Yorkshire. It was written by Kay Mellor. Series 1 began on BBC One on 27 March 2012 and consisted of 5 episodes.

No. overall	No. in season	Title	Directed by	Written by	Original release date	UK viewers (millions)
1	1	"Stuart"	Kay Mellor	Kay Mellor	27 March 2012	5.87
Stuart Bradley works with his younger brother Jamie at the local convenience store, Right Buy U, while his pregnant fiancée Amy squanders his money. Under pressure to find their own place, Stuart agrees to rob the store with Jaime. However, things go horribly wrong when the kindly manager, Bob, interrupts them, and Jamie unnecessarily hits him over the head with a bottle of whisky. Later, Bob is rushed to hospital in a critical state, while DCI Newell of the Yorkshire police force begin to investigate. Things are thrown another curveball when, along with the other members of the syndicate, Stuart learns that they have won the lottery. And in a twist of fate, his share of the money relies on Bob's vote, as he hasn't paid his dues for the last five weeks. Meanwhile, Leanne shies away from the camera at a press conference.
2	2	"Denise"	Kay Mellor	Kay Mellor	3 April 2012	6.09
Denise becomes a spendthrift to escape her miserable life, caring for her bedridden mother after her husband has walked out on her. She decides to have plastic surgery but is eventually talked out of it by her co-workers and decides to contribute to a dog rescue and care charity. The police close in on Jamie and Stuart, as Jamie's alibi is proved to be false and CCTV footage casts shadows on Stuart's account of the story. Meanwhile, Leanne gets angry at the attitude of the replacement manager for Bob and quits in a fury. Bob learns that his brain scan is irregular.
3	3	"Bob"	Kay Mellor	Kay Mellor	10 April 2012	5.98
Bob has the results of his scans back at the hospital, where he is told that he has terminal brain cancer. He also discovers the truth about the robbery from Stuart and decides not to pursue any action against him and Jamie. His relationship with his long-term partner Annie is compromised when he meets with his ex-wife, but later stuns her by proposing to her at a lavish party. Leanne and Stuart find an experimental treatment in South Africa which gives Bob hope of being cured.
4	4	"Leanne"	Kay Mellor	Kay Mellor	17 April 2012	6.08
Stuart and Leanne kiss at the party, with him desperate for her not to move away. Later, she is horrified when her daughter goes missing, and explains the truth to Stuart. Her daughter was actually kidnapped from foster to stop her birth mother claiming her back. Jealous and vengeful of Leanne, Amy calls the police on her, resulting in her arrest. Meanwhile, it's the last day at Right Buy U for the members of the syndicate, but Stuart doesn't make it to the end of the day as he walks out.
5	5	"Jamie"	Kay Mellor	Kay Mellor	24 April 2012	6.04
Jamie thinks he is untouchable now he has won the lottery, but the police remain convinced he was involved in the Right Buy U robbery. He is forced to go head-to-head with a local drug dealer and his gang. In South Africa, Bob and Annie marry, and he undergoes successful surgery. Amy tells Stuart she wants to marry him, but he chooses Leanne instead, and ends their relationship. He also confesses to the police about the robbery. When Jamie learns about the confession, he panics and desperately tries to flee, but loses control of his Porsche and dies in a collision with a parked lorry.

=== Series 2 (2013) ===
The second series aired in 2013 on BBC One. It revolves around another syndicate in a similar situation. It was written by Kay Mellor. The series looks at a syndicate involving workers at a public hospital in Bradford, Yorkshire. Series 2 began on BBC One on 19 March 2013 and consisted of 6 episodes.

No. overall	No. in season	Title	Directed by	Written by	Original release date	UK viewers (millions)
6	1	"'Becky'"	Kay Mellor	Kay Mellor	19 March 2013	6.50
Becky Atkinson is a trainee-nurse at St. Anthony's Hospital in Bradford, along with her mother Mandy, and is in a syndicate with auxiliary nurse Rose Wilson, nurse Tom Bedford and porter Alan Walters. Becky struggles as a young mother and on a night out, she inadvertently hands the week's lottery ticket to Luke Summers, a rugby player for the Bradford Bulls. Helen Dolan, a nurse who left the syndicate four months ago, discovers they have won £72,000,000 on the lottery, and Becky faces a race against time to get the ticket back.
7	2	"Tom"	Kay Mellor	Kay Mellor	26 March 2013	5.58
Tom and Natalie are a couple trying to have a baby. They have had 3 unsuccessful attempts of IVF off the NHS, and can't afford another course of treatment. Things change when he wins the lottery, and although they can continue with trying to have a baby, Tom's friends push him away through jealousy and he makes a shock discovery about his father.
8	3	"Rose"	Dominic Leclerc	Kay Mellor	2 April 2013	6.34
Rose can finally have her knee operation now she has money from the lottery. However, her life continues to be as chaotic as ever with 5 children squabbling for her money. Things start to unravel when the DWP discover she has been fraudulently claiming benefits to raise her children on her nursing wage. Despite facing a custodial sentence, Rose is told she can pay of her debts, but an embittered Helen tips off the tabloid journalists to run a story running her name in the mud.
9	4	"Luke"	Dominic Leclerc	Kay Mellor	9 April 2013	6.22
Becky's life faces further complications now she is a millionaire. Her relationship with Luke seems to be budding, but she soon realises her friends are using her for money and she gets agitated. She fears Luke is also using her, but is stunned when he reveals he knew he had the winning lottery ticket and intended to keep it until Becky turned up. His brother is mentally disabled and needs help, and in light of this, Becky invests £100,000 in the rugby club. The episode ends with Becky giving Luke her BMW Car, cementing their relationship.
10	5	"Alan"	Kay Mellor	Kay Mellor	16 April 2013	6.37
Alan has a budding relationship with Rose, with whom he smokes home-grown cannabis to help with her knee pain. When he wins the lottery, his alcoholism begins to return, despite Rose reminding him what his problem did to his family relationships last time. When his forgetfulness causes him to lose a corpse, he quits his job in a fury, and orders a mail-order bride from Thailand. Upset by his turbulent relationship with his son, he splashes out on an expensive yacht, and is later stunned to discover his bride is a ladyboy. Alan devastates her by fleeing the boat, and later his house goes up in flames with Alan passed out inside. Rose rushes to save her friend, and after they commit to a relationship, to sort their respective lives out.
11	6	"Mandy"	Kay Mellor	Kay Mellor	23 April 2013	6.71
Mandy has a big secret; she has been stealing medication from work for years and mixing it into her abusive husband Steve's beer, to sedate him and escape domestic violence. She longs to escape from her marriage, and on winning the lottery she makes plans to run. However, Steve finds out that she has been drugging him and violently attacks her, and in protecting herself, Mandy pushes him down the stairs and then holds him captive in the basement. Helen finds out what she has been doing and blackmails her for a million pounds to keep quiet, but she later spitefully reports her anyway, having lost all her friends. Becky and Tom manage to cover up Mandy's medication theft, and Alan protects her from Steve when he escapes. At the airport to go on holiday, Becky helps Mandy finally escape her husband and she flies to Greece, finally free of him.

=== Series 3 (2015) ===
BBC One renewed The Syndicate for a third series of six episodes, and the first episode was broadcast on 2 June 2015. This series was filmed in Yorkshire in 2014. The BBC announced the details of the third series of the programme on 21 October 2014. Actor/comedian Lenny Henry stars in the series, which chronicles the lottery win of a staff syndicate at a crumbling stately home. Lynda Bellingham was due to play the role of a solicitor, in a role written especially for her by Kay Mellor, but she died shortly before filming commenced.

No. overall	No. in season	Title	Directed by	Written by	Original release date	UK viewers (millions)
12	1	"Dawn"	Kay Mellor	Kay Mellor	2 June 2015	7.15
Pregnant Dawn Stevenson and her 17-year-old diabetic daughter Amy work as maids at run-down Hazelwood Manor, along with cook Julie and her daughter, manageress Sarah, gardener Godfrey and handyman Sean. The owner of the manor, Lord Charles Hazelwood who has recently suffered a stroke is kind-hearted and very loyal to his staff. The household is run by his imperious, self-centred wife, Rachel and his stepson, Spencer (with whom Amy is having an affair). Due to the expense of maintaining the property and the family being more than six million pounds in debt, the manor is now run on a skeleton staff, and can barely afford to pay a living wage. To bring in cash, the Hazelwoods host a party of visiting Americans and during their stay the six members of staff, who are members of a lottery syndicate, find that they have won fourteen million pounds. Whilst they are celebrating Amy disappears, having rowed with aggressive ex-boyfriend Nick.
13	2	"Godfrey"	Kay Mellor	Kay Mellor	9 June 2015	6.90
The police start to recognise that there may be something more sinister to Amy's disappearance, and suspicion falls on the last person to see her, Godfrey. Godfrey, who has Asperger syndrome, struggles to comprehend what is going on and why he is a suspect. They discover that Amy was using Godfrey's affection for her to get her own way, and Amy's father Andy lashes out at everyone around him. Meanwhile, Julie rallies the staff together with a proposition for a struggling Lord Hazelwood; they want to invest in Hazelwood Manor to ensure its future. Rachel and Spencer react with fury, having hoped he would go with the more substantial offer the Americans had made, but Charles is adamant that he would prefer to keep the manor in his family.
14	3	"Sean"	Dominic Leclerc	Kay Mellor	16 June 2015	6.85
A journalist approaches the Stevensons with the news that Sean has a big secret; he is on the sex offenders register, having done three years for rape. Andy once again lashes out, while Sarah is devastated by the prospect that Sean is not who he says he is. Sean eventually tells the full story – some years previously, when he worked as a mounted police officer in his native Scotland, he had unknowingly entered into a relationship with an underage girl named Mary Campbell (who bears a striking resemblance to Amy) doing her Duke of Edinburgh community service, who had lied about her age. Upon learning she was only 15, he had tried to end the relationship, but had been unable to, and the two had tried to run away. The incident had cost him his career in the police and destroyed his relationship with his family – only Lord Hazelwood had been willing to offer him work. Meanwhile, Charles learns that some of his paintings have been swapped for fakes, and turns on his wife with his suspicions.
15	4	"Lord and Lady Hazelwood"	Dominic Leclerc	Kay Mellor	23 June 2015	6.31
Nick resurfaces and the police question him on Amy's disappearance. Meanwhile, at the Manor, the Hazelwoods' marriage is more strained than ever. Rachel holds a lavish party to celebrate her 25th Wedding Anniversary, hiring caterers that clash with Julie and the rest of the staff, and the Americans make Charles an offer twice the size of the staff's for the land around the manor. He once again refuses and seeks to revoke Rachel's Power of Attorney. Just as the Hazelwood's marriage seems at rock bottom, Julie makes a surprise revelation; Rachel has been having an affair for years with the family solicitor. Sarah makes a discovery which leaves her deeply suspicious of her mother. As he enters the caravan in which he lives, Nick is shot from behind.
16	5	"Julie"	Kay Mellor	Kay Mellor	30 June 2015	6.49
Sarah and Sean investigate the antique clock they have discovered in Julie's possession and find that it went missing from Hazelwood Manor 3 years previously. When they confront her, Rachel learns of the discovery and confronts her husband, with the intention to get him to change his mind about the Syndicate's offer. To her shock, Charles reveals that he gave it to Julie as a gift when her husband had died, and also reveals that they had had a brief affair shortly after his first wife's death. Sarah is devastated by the thought of her mother betraying her recently deceased father and turns to Sean for comfort. Charles goes to Julie to apologise for upsetting Sarah, and admits that he has wished for some time that they could have made a go of their relationship. To his shock, she makes a surprise revelation of her own: that her late husband was infertile, and that Charles is actually Sarah's biological father. With evidence that she has been selling her husband's paintings mounting, and their marriage in pieces, a dejected Rachel leaves the manor for good. Spencer resurfaces and faces questions from the police, while Andy comes under suspicion from both the police and Dawn following Nick's shooting.
17	6	"Sarah"	Kay Mellor	Kay Mellor	7 July 2015	6.36
On the day of Hazelwood Manor's grand opening, Amy suddenly turns up, alive and reasonably unharmed, to Dawn's shock and intense relief. She explains the full story of her disappearance: After separating from her mother at Hazelwood Manor, she had been picked up by Nick and returned with him to his caravan. He had become forceful with her, but had been rescued by Spencer, who had gone after her. While making a pit stop on the way back to the manor, Amy's low blood sugar caused her to fall and injured herself, so he had taken her to his yacht instead, and seeing an opportunity, had taken a photo of her in her injured state, acquired an emergency insulin pen and, using lies and the pen, tricked her into staying there with the intent to steal Dawn's lottery winnings. Spencer is arrested when he turns up at Hazelwood Manor to look for Amy. Meanwhile, Charles tries to convince Julie to confess to Sarah her true parentage, which would allow him to name her as a beneficiary to his family trust and prevent his wife from claiming a share on the manor in their upcoming divorce. As the celebrations at Hazelwood Manor commence, Dawn suddenly goes into labour and is taken to the hospital.

=== Series 4 (2021) ===
The fourth series began airing on 30 March on BBC One.

No. overall	No. in season	Title	Directed by	Written by	Original release date	UK viewers (millions)
18	1	"Episode 1"	Kay Mellor	Kay Mellor	30 March 2021	5.50
19	2	"Episode 2"	Kay Mellor	Kay Mellor	6 April 2021	5.05
20	3	"Episode 3"	Dominic Leclerc	Kay Mellor	13 April 2021	3.93
21	4	"Episode 4"	Dominic Leclerc	Kay Mellor	20 April 2021	3.92
22	5	"Episode 5"	Dominic Leclerc	Kay Mellor	27 April 2021	3.87
23	6	"Episode 6"	Kay Mellor	Kay Mellor	4 May 2021	4.43

== American adaptation ==
On 1 February 2013, it was announced that ABC had ordered a pilot for a US remake. It was renamed Lucky 7 and written by David Zabel and Jason Richman. Lucky 7 was cancelled on 4 October 2013 after only two episodes were broadcast, due to extremely low ratings.
