= Glorious (film) =

- Poster
- Directed by: Rebekah McKendry
- Screenplay by: Joshua Hull; David Ian McKendry
- Story by: Todd Rigney
- Produced by: Bob Portal; Inderpal Singh; Joe Wicker; Morgan Peter Brown; Jason Scott Goldberg; Christian Armogida
- Starring: Ryan Kwanten; J. K. Simmons
- Cinematography: David Matthews
- Edited by: Joseph Shahood
- Music by: Jake Hull
- Production companies: Fallback Plan Productions; Eyevox Entertainment; Alliance Media Partners; Citizen Skull Productions
- Distributed by: Shudder
- Release dates: July 21, 2022 (Fantasia Festival); August 18, 2022
- Running time: 79 minutes
- Country: United States
- Language: English

Glorious is a 2022 American comedy horror film directed by Rebekah McKendry and starring Ryan Kwanten and J. K. Simmons. The film involves a heartbroken man encountering a strange, all-knowing entity in a rest-stop bathroom stall.

== Plot ==
Distraught over his breakup with his ex, Brenda, Wes stops his car at a roadside rest stop. That night, he gets blackout drunk and burns all his possessions, including his pants and box of photos. The following day, he stumbles into an empty restroom to vomit. The man in the stall beside him starts a conversation and reveals his name, Ghatanothoa. As the conversation becomes uncomfortable, Wes realizes the door is sealed shut. Ghatanothoa explains that it is a demigod created by his primordial godfather who accidentally created the universe, including humanity. Incredulous, Wes attempts to peek through the stall's glory hole and over the stall door to see it, despite Ghatanothoa's warnings, as glimpsing its proper form would destroy Wes. Exerting its power, Ghatanothoa punishes Wes by giving him visions of Brenda. Wes attempts to escape through the air vent but returns to the restroom.

Ghatanothoa explains that its father created Ghatanothoa as a tool to destroy humanity. However, Ghatanothoa's older siblings sealed their father away to stop him. But now, the god is free, and Ghatanothoa, having developed an affection for humanity, has hidden away from its father to avoid being used to destroy the universe. Ghatanothoa tells Wes that to hide permanently, he must transcend into the ethereal plane but can only do so if its physical form is "satisfied" by a mortal, which must be done through the glory hole. While corporeal, Ghatanothoa's powers are weakened, further exposing its location to its father. Ghatanothoa is apologetic for what must be done and pleads with Wes to help it, arguing that humanity is precious. Wes counters with his own experiences of his abusive father and how he never felt anything for anyone except for Brenda.

A maintenance worker arrives, and Wes screams for help despite Ghatanothoa warning him that this will end badly. The man also becomes trapped in the bathroom, and to prevent him from telling anyone about this, Ghatanothoa explodes him into blood and body parts. Wes uses his dismembered leg to try to bash down the door but eventually gives up. Wes inserts his penis into the glory hole, only for Ghatanothoa to be shocked, clarifying that "satisfaction" means offering a piece of his liver, and passes him a shard of broken glass, causing Wes to once again back off.

The stress eventually causes Wes to scream for Ghatanothoa's father to find them. The rest stop begins to crumble away as the god tears through reality. Desperate, Ghatanothoa removes Wes's memories of Brenda to show him what universal annihilation will mean. Wes relents and begs to see Brenda again in exchange for doing the deed. Ghatanothoa restores his memories, and with Ghatanothoa's father in sight, Wes cuts a hole in his abdomen and allows Ghatanothoa to pull his liver out. In excruciating pain, Wes' thoughts reveal that he is a serial killer who murdered Brenda after she discovered the photos of his victims in his box.

With Wes' offering, Ghatanothoa transcends into the ether, foiling its father. Wes weakly asks if this makes him a hero. Ghatanothoa departs, stating that he is no hero and that as entities of destruction, both deserve to be forgotten and die. Wes soon dies just outside the restroom, holding a teddy bear Brenda had given him.

== Cast ==
- Ryan Kwanten as Wes, a man distraught over the end of his relationship with his girlfriend.
- J. K. Simmons as the voice of Ghatanothoa, a primordial demigod created by its godly father to destroy the universe.
- Sylvia Grace Crim as Brenda, Wes's girlfriend.
- Andre' Lamar as Gary C, a rest stop worker.
- Tordy Clark as Sharon, a trucker.
- Sarah Clark as Blonde Woman At Party.
- Katie Bacque as The Bear

== Production ==
In February 2022, it was announced that the film was "quietly nearing completion."

== Release ==
In May 2022, it was announced that Shudder acquired distribution rights to the film in the United States, Canada, the United Kingdom, Ireland, Australia, and New Zealand. The film premiered at the 2022 Fantasia International Film Festival and was released on Shudder on August 18, 2022.

== Reception ==
On the review aggregation website Rotten Tomatoes, the film holds an approval rating of 86% with an average rating of 7.1 out of 10, based on 59 reviews. The website's critical consensus reads, "With thought-provoking themes lurking beneath its absurd premise, Glorious is a brightly blood-spattered genre treat from director Rebekah McKendry." Metacritic, which uses a weighted average, assigned the film a score of 60 out of 100, based on 7 critics, indicating "mixed or average" reviews.

Matt Donato of /Film rated the film a 7 out of 10. J. Hurtado of ScreenAnarchy gave the film a positive review and wrote, "...McKendry’s Glorious is a fun, gooey, occasionally mean-spirited, but very creative cosmic horror that brings a new level of grossness to a location already thought of as super gross by most who are forced to use it."
