= A Passionate Woman =

2010 British miniseries

- Genre: Drama
- Written by: Kay Mellor
- Directed by: Antonia Bird; Kay Mellor
- Starring: Billie Piper; Theo James; Joe Armstrong; Sue Johnston; Kelly Harrison
- Composer: Mark Bradshaw
- Country of origin: United Kingdom
- Original language: English
- No. of series: 1
- No. of episodes: 2

Production
- Executive producers: Nicola Shindler; Polly Hill; Hugo Heppell
- Producer: Yvonne Francas
- Production locations: Leeds, West Yorkshire, England
- Running time: 90 minutes (x2)
- Production company: Rollem Productions in association with Screen Yorkshire for BBC

Original release
- Network: BBC One
- Release: 11 April – 18 April 2010

A Passionate Woman is a British two-part drama that aired on BBC One from 11 to 18 April 2010. It was written by Kay Mellor, an adaptation of her 1992 stage play, inspired by her mother's life story.

== Plot ==
In the 1950s Yorkshire, Betty Stevenson, a married mother of one, falls in love with her Polish neighbour, Alex Crazenovski, aka "Craze." The two begin an affair, and Craze sends a letter to Betty asking her to run away with him. She responds in kind, and her letter is found by Craze's pregnant wife, who promptly seeks him out at the fairground where he works and shoots him dead. With her lover dead, Betty continues her life with her husband Donald and baby Mark.

The story then moves forward to the 1980s as Mark gets married and her affair becomes public knowledge.

== Inspiration ==
Kay Mellor was inspired to write the story after her mother confessed to having an affair with a Polish neighbour in the 1950s when living in a poorer area of Leeds. Just like the story, the unnamed Pole was killed, which ended her mother's affair which she had kept secret for 30 years before revealing all. Mellor explained that with her mother being dead for three years, it was a way of bringing her back to life.

The work was originally a play that had first been performed at the West Yorkshire Playhouse in 1992 before moving on to the West End theatre. Mellor admitted that the film rights had been mooted, but she feared the production would end up with "...Cher on a rooftop in Detroit".

== Filming locations ==
Filmed in 2009, Screen Yorkshire invested £250,000 in the programme and supplied crew for the filming locations. External scenes were filmed at Roundhay Park, Hyde Terrace, Hyde Park Cinema, Blenheim Square and the City Centre Market in Leeds. Additional filming was done at Bradford City Hall, St Luke's Hospital, and King's Hall and Winter Gardens in Bradford. Other parts were also recorded at Studio 81 in Leeds.

== Episodes ==
#	Title	Director	Writer	Original release date
1	"Episode 1"	Kay Mellor and Antonia Bird	Kay Mellor	11 April 2010
2	"Episode 2"	Kay Mellor and Antonia Bird	Kay Mellor	18 April 2010

== Polish adaptation ==
In 2009, Maciej Englert directed a Polish adaptation of the original play. The main roles were played by Marta Lipińska, Piotr Adamczyk and Krzysztof Kowalewski.
