= Antonia Bird =

Film director

Antonia Bird FRSA
- Born: 27 May 1951; Kensington, England
- Died: 24 October 2013 (aged 62); London, England, UK
- Occupations: Theatre, television & film director & producer
- Years active: 1968–2013

Antonia Jane Bird, FRSA (27 May 1951 – 24 October 2013) was an English producer and director of television drama and feature films.

== Career ==
In 1968, at the age of 17, Bird began working in theatre as an assistant stage manager at Coventry Rep. She worked her way up doing a variety of jobs, including acting, stage management, publicity, theatre administration and directing in repertory and regional theatres. She directed a season of plays at The Studio at Chester Theatre and later joined Leicester's Phoenix Theatre as a director.

Bird was named resident director at the Royal Court Theatre in 1978. She was appointed artistic director of the Royal Court's Theatre Upstairs, London's leading venue for new writing. Her first television production was Submariners (1983), an adaptation of one of her Royal Court productions which she directed for the BBC. She was recruited by the originators and founding producers of EastEnders, Julia Smith and Tony Holland, to direct the series in 1985; she directed 17 episodes, including the series' first two-hander, between the characters Den Watts (Leslie Grantham) and Angie Watts (Anita Dobson).

The creators of Casualty (1986) recruited her to be one of the series' first directors. She next directed the six-part adaptation of Ann Oakley's The Men's Room (BBC 1991). Her next production was a feature-length film adaptation of A Masculine Ending (1992). Subsequently, Safe (BBC 1993), a story based on the lives of a group of homeless young people in London's West End was awarded the Best Single Drama TV BAFTA. The film also won a British Academy Award and a clutch of festival prizes including the Edinburgh International Film Festival First Film Award and Best British Film at the Dinard Film Festival. The film brought Bird to international attention, but was overshadowed by the success of Priest (BBC/Miramax 1994), which she directed immediately following Safe.

Bird's film Care, broadcast in 2000, dealt with sexual abuse in a children's home, and won the Best Single Drama TV BAFTA. She received a BAFTA Children's Award for the 2009 BBC documentary Off By Heart, about a national poetry competition for schoolchildren.

Bird developed feature films with Sony, Columbia, Warner Brothers, Fine Line and some American independent companies. She returned to London to shoot Face (UIP/New Line 1997), a gangster film. She was back in the U.S. to develop the horror satire Ravenous, with Guy Pearce, Robert Carlyle and David Arquette (20th Century Fox 1999).

In 2005, she produced Faith, a 4Way Pictures/Company Pictures production about the 1984–1985 national miners' strike. She was an executive producer of the 2009 Iraqi film Son of Babylon.

In 2010, she and Kay Mellor realised their story about Mellor's mother in A Passionate Woman (BBC 2010), which the duo directed.

In 2011, Cross My Mind, Bird's next film, was set to start shooting.

In 2012, Bird directed the first four episodes of the first series of Peter Moffat's BBC period drama, The Village. Series 2 episode 1 finishes with the tribute 'For Antonia Bird 1951–2013'.

== Affiliations ==
Bird was a member of the American Academy of Motion Picture Arts and Sciences; the British Academy of Film and Television Arts, the Directors Guild of America, Directors UK, BECTU, and a Fellow of the Royal Society of Arts.

== Death ==
Bird died from a rare anaplastic thyroid cancer on 24 October 2013 at the age of 62. She is survived by her husband, the TV editor Ian Ilett.

== Filmography ==
=== Television ===
Year	Title	Role	Notes
2013	The Village		Series 1
2010	A Passionate Woman		
2009	Off by Heart		TV documentary
2006	Cracker		Special Episode
2005	Spooks		
2004	The Hamburg Cell		TV movie
2003	Rehab		TV movie
2000	Care		TV movie
1993	Full Stretch		
1992	A Masculine Ending		TV movie
1991	The Men's Room		
1988	Thin Air		
1986–1987	Casualty		
1985–1986	EastEnders		

=== Film ===
Year	Title	Role	Notes
2018	Oi For England's Green and Pleasant Land	Executive Producer (posthumous credit)	
2009	Son of Babylon	Executive Producer	
2005	Faith	Producer	
1999	Ravenous		
1997	Face		
1995	Mad Love		
1994	Priest		
1993	Safe		

== See also ==
- List of female film and television directors
- List of LGBT-related films directed by women

== Additional sources ==
- Ciecko, Anne T. "Sex, God, Television, Realism, and the British Women Filmmakers Beeban Kidron and Antonia Bird", Journal of Film and Video, Spring 1999, pp. 22–41
- McCabe, Bob. "East End Heat", Sight and Sound, October 1997, pp. 10–12
