= Lorraine Bruce =

British actress

- Born: 18 June; Warrington, England, UK
- Occupation: Actress
- Years active: 1994–present
- Parent(s): Tommy Bruce and Sheila Bruce

Lorraine Bruce is a British television, film and stage actress, best known for her portrayal of Denise Simpson in all four series of the Kay Mellor BBC One series The Syndicate In 2013, she was cast in Lucky 7, the U.S. version of The Syndicate. Bruce trained at The Academy of Live and Recorded Arts.

== Filmography ==
=== Television ===
Year	Title	Role	Notes
1998	The Bill	Caitlin Lynch	Episode: "Square Peg. Round Hole"
1999	The Bill	Theresa Cairns	Episodes: "Old Flame" and "Push It"
2002	Dalziel and Pascoe	Nurse	Episode: "Mens Sana"
2004	The Bill	Sarah Kingsman	Episode: "249: Ulterior Motive"
2005	Holby City	Sara Robinson	3 episodes
2006	Eleventh Hour	Ellis Gibson's Partner	Episode: "Containment"
2006	Dalziel and Pascoe	Maggie Ruddlesdin	Episode: "The Cave Woman"
2007	Party Animals	BNP Woman	Episode #1.8
2007	Casualty	Sara Robinson	Episode: "(What's So Funny 'Bout) Peace, Love and Understanding"
2009	Benidorm	Valda	Episode #3.4
2011	Come Fly with Me	Female Passenger	Episode #1.6
2011	Life's Too Short	Mother	Episode #1.2
2012	Gates	Scary Mum	4 episodes
2012	The Royle Family	Carol	Episode: "Barbara's Old Ring"
2012–2021	The Syndicate	Denise Simpson	Main cast; 4 series
2013	Lucky 7	Denise Dibinsky	Main cast; all 8 episodes
2017	White Gold	Miss Barnes	5 episodes
2017	Will	Mistress Harding	5 episodes
2018	Watership Down	Farmer's Wife	Voice role; TV mini-series; all 4 episodes
2019	Vera	Carmel Sumner	Episode: "Dirty"
2022	Dodger	Mrs Grundles	Episodes: "Runaways" and "Waxworks"

=== Film ===
Year	Title	Role	Notes
2006	Dark Corners	Mary Sullivan	
2006	Provoked	Doreen	
2008	Eden Lake	Tanya	
2009	The Scouting Book for Boys	Betty	
2014	Kerry	Kerry's Mum	TV film
2017	King Arthur: Legend of the Sword	Syren 1	

=== Theatre ===
- Piaf, as Toine; Donmar Warehouse/West End transfer
- Les Miserables, as Madame Thenardier; West End
- Vernon God Little, as End Pam/Judge/Other Roles; Young Vic
- That Day We Sang, as Dorothy/Pauline; Manchester International Festival
- The Rise and Fall Of Little Voice, as Sadie Mae
- Teechers, as Hobby
- Romeo & Juliet, as Nurse; Hull Truck
- Saucy Jack & The Space Vixens, as Chesty Prospects; London Cast
- Mail Order Bride, as June
- Get Ken Barlow, as Leslie
- Scuffer, as Cathy; West Yorkshire Playhouse

=== Video games ===
- Final Fantasy XVI, as Charon
