= All the Creatures Were Stirring =

2018 American Christmas horror anthology film

- Theatrical release poster
- Directed by: Rebekah McKendry; David Ian McKendry
- Written by: Rebekah McKendry; David Ian McKendry
- Produced by: Morgan Peter Brown; Joe Wicker
- Starring: The Stockings Were Hung: Jocelin Donahue; Michelle DeFraites; Edward Hong; Herve Clermont; Chase Williamson; Josh Drennen; Larry Zerner; Jesse Merlin; Diane Sellers; Quinn Callens; Matt Mercer; Dash Away All: Matt Long; Makeda Declet; Catherine Parker; All Through The House/Elf TV: Jonathan Kite; Peter Cilella; Amanda Fuller; Connie Ventress; Archie Hahn; Dashiell Kane; Fatty McGoo; Dylan Matlock; John Humphrey; Mike Manfre; Brea Grant; Shane Carpenter; Arose Such A Clatter: Mark Kelly; Megan Duffy; In A Twinkling: Morgan Peter Brown; Constance Wu; Stephanie Drake; Tifanny Elle; Craig Lee Thomas; To All A Good Night: Ashley Clements; Graham Skipper
- Edited by: Jeff Seidman
- Music by: Seth Colegrove
- Production company: FallBack Plan Productions
- Distributed by: RLJE Films
- Release dates: April 6, 2018 (initial); December 4, 2018 (United States)
- Running time: 80 minutes
- Country: United States
- Language: English

All the Creatures Were Stirring is a 2018 American Christmas horror comedy anthology film produced by FallBack Plan Productions and distributed by RLJE Films. It was written and directed by Rebekah McKendry and her husband David Ian McKendry & produced by Morgan Peter Brown and Joe Wicker.

Released on December 4, 2018, the film received mixed reviews.

== Premise ==
A couple attends a strange theater for a Christmas play and finds themselves watching a series of unsettling holiday horror stories. From ghostly figures to dark traditions, the tales reveal the chilling side of the festive season, leaving the couple questioning what they’ve stepped into.

== Segments ==
=== The Stockings Were Hung ===
- Cast: Jocelin Donahue, Michelle DeFraites, Edward Hong, Herve Clermont, Chase Williamson, Josh Drennen, Larry Zerner, Jesse Merlin, Diane Sellers, Quinn Callens, Matt Mercer (uncredited)

During a seemingly mundane office Christmas party, employees are forced to participate in a deadly Secret Santa exchange where the gifts hold horrifying consequences.

=== Dash Away All ===
- Cast: Matt Long, Makeda Declet, Catherine Parker, Alexander Ward

On Christmas Eve, after rushing to finish his shopping, Eric accidentally locked his keys in his car, with his phone inside. He saw two women nearby, Sasha and Frankie, and asked them for help. He didn't know that Sasha and Frankie were planning something evil - a special ceremony to call forth a powerful demon.

=== All Through The House/Elf TV ===
- Cast: Jonathan Kite, Peter Cilella, Amanda Fuller, Connie Ventress, Archie Hahn, Dashiell Kane, Fatty McGoo, Dylan Matlock, John Humphrey, Mike Manfre, Brea Grant, Shane Carpenter

Chet disliked Christmas, especially his neighbor's flashy lights. On Christmas Eve, flipping through TV channels, Chet found a spooky letter. It warned of three ghosts coming to change his grumpy Christmas spirit.

=== Arose Such A Clatter ===
- Cast: Mark Kelly, Megan Duffy

Following a harrowing late-night drive where they may have struck a reindeer, Guy returned home with his wife, Suzy. While a sense of normalcy initially returned, an unsettling feeling soon crept over Guy. He began to suspect they were being watched, or perhaps even stalked, by an unseen presence.

=== In A Twinkling ===
- Cast: Morgan Peter Brown, Constance Wu, Stephanie Drake, Tifanny Elle, Craig Lee Thomas

It was Christmas Eve, and Gabby was at a party with her boyfriend Steve and their friends. Things weren't going well though, as Gabby and Steve ended up in a big argument. Feeling frustrated, Gabby decided to step outside for some fresh air. As she looked up at the night sky, something incredible happened. The stars started to move and glow, swirling together in a strange light. Before Gabby knew what was happening, she was enveloped by the light and zapped to another place. It looked like Christmas alright, but everything felt weird and twisted. It was a spooky, messed-up version of Christmas Eve, and Gabby had no idea how to get back home.

=== To All A Good Night ===
- Cast: Ashley Clements, Graham Skipper

Max and Jenna were captivated by a play, particularly the intriguing final act. However, during this critical moment, Max was struck by an untimely urge and scurried off to the restroom. Jenna, left to her own devices, continued to watch the play's conclusion. Yet, a sense of bewilderment crept in. The actions on stage became increasingly perplexing, and the plot seemed to unravel before her eyes. By the time Max returned, the play had reached a confusing and bizarre finale.

== Production ==
=== Writing ===
In 2015, Rebekah McKendry, alongside her spouse David Ian McKendry, co-wrote the screenplay for the film and marked their directorial debut with the project.

=== Casting ===
In the same year, Constance Wu, known for her role in Crazy Rich Asians and Jonathan Kite, a star of 2 Broke Girls, were confirmed to appear in the film. Other casts members include Amanda Fuller, Brea Grant, Graham Skipper, and Stephanie Drake and many more.

=== Filming ===
In 2018, Rebekah McKendry revealed that she directed the film while pregnant throughout the nine-month term. In her words, "We shot the first two segments while I was nine months pregnant. Then we had to stop because it reached a point where I went a little bit past my due date. My doctor was like, 'Okay, you have to give birth this Wednesday, we're making an appointment.' My first call wasn't to my parents, it was to my producers, saying, 'Okay guys, we can't shoot next weekend, I have to go give birth.' We took three weeks off after I gave birth, and then we were right back on, and I brought my son to set with me."

== Release ==
=== Theatrical ===
All the Creatures Were Stirring was released in the United States on December 4, 2018.

=== Home media ===
The film was released on digital, video on demand, DVD on the same day, and on Blu-ray on January 8, 2019.

== Reception ==
On the review aggregator Rotten Tomatoes, the film has an approval rating of 62%, based on 13 reviews, with a rating average of 4.80/10.
