= Strictly Confidential (TV series) =

- Genre: Comedy drama
- Created by: Kay Mellor
- Written by: Kay Mellor
- Country of origin: United Kingdom
- Original language: English
- No. of series: 1
- No. of episodes: 6

Production
- Executive producer: Kay Mellor

Original release
- Network: ITV
- Release: 16 November – 21 December 2006

Strictly Confidential is a six-part drama, written by Kay Mellor and originally shown on ITV from 16 November to 21 December 2006.

== Plot ==
It stars Suranne Jones as Linda, a "3 on the Kinsey Scale" bisexual ex police officer turned sex therapist, who shares a practice in Leeds with her brother-in-law, played by Tristan Gemmill. Her life is complicated by the fact that her husband Richard, her business partner's brother, played by Cristian Solimeno, has low fertility and cannot give her the baby she wants. She is all for asking his brother (her business partner) to be a sperm donor, which does not sit well with his wife (Kate Isitt). Linda's husband (Richard) is also not keen on the idea at all but lets Linda go ahead and ask his brother who consents to be a sperm donor. Sexual tension becomes obvious between the pair, and they soon begin sleeping together, with disastrous consequences for all involved.

Further complications occur with Linda's involvement as a CID consultant in a bizarre spate of murders that centre on erotic asphyxiation and could be linked back to her practice. The murder enquiry is led by Linda's former lover from her police days named Angie, played by Eva Pope. However, Linda is suspicious of the second 'murder' and of Angie, as it all seems a bit too convenient.
