= Vincent Davies =

English actor

- Born: Vincent Paul Davies; July 14, 1968 (age 57); Manchester, England
- Years active: 1993-present
- Website: http://www.myspace.com/vinnydavies

Vincent Paul Davies (born 14 July 1968) is an English actor.

Davies has lived in the Manchester area all of his life and has appeared in many Manchester-based television programmes. These include the acclaimed drama Vincent, alongside Suranne Jones and Ray Winstone, and Conviction, a murder-based drama set in the North-West. Also, he has appeared in many feature-length films, including Who Killed Simone Valentine? and Everybody Loves Sunshine, alongside David Bowie and Goldie. Currently, he is appearing in the British sitcom The Visit, which also features Steve Edge and Iain McKee.
