= Jack & Bobby =

American television series (2004–2005)

- Genre: Drama
- Created by: Greg Berlanti; Vanessa Taylor; Steven A. Cohen; Brad Meltzer
- Starring: Christine Lahti; Matt Long; Logan Lerman; Jessica Paré; Edwin Hodge; John Slattery; Bradley Cooper; Keri Lynn Pratt
- Composer: Blake Neely
- Country of origin: United States
- Original language: English
- No. of seasons: 1
- No. of episodes: 22

Production
- Executive producers: Greg Berlanti; Mickey Liddell; Thomas Schlamme
- Producer: Paul Marks
- Running time: 60 minutes
- Production companies: Berlanti-Liddell Productions; Shoe Money Productions; Warner Bros. Television

Original release
- Network: The WB
- Release: September 12, 2004 – May 11, 2005

Jack & Bobby is an American drama television series created by Greg Berlanti, Vanessa Taylor, Steven A. Cohen, and Brad Meltzer. It aired on The WB from September 12, 2004, to May 11, 2005. The series' title is a reference to real-life political brothers John and Robert Kennedy.

The series stars Matt Long and Logan Lerman as Jack and Bobby McCallister, respectively; two teenage brothers in Missouri of whom one would become the president of the United States from 2041 to 2049. The series also starred Christine Lahti as their mother, a college professor, as well as Jessica Paré, John Slattery, Edwin Hodge, Keri Lynn Pratt, and Bradley Cooper. Episodes would generally focus on the boys' family and school lives, with flash-forwards of a documentary about President McCallister used as a framing device.

While it received critical acclaim, Jack & Bobby struggled from low ratings on the network and was cancelled on May 17, 2005.

== Premise ==
The series follows the lives of fifteen-year-old Jack and thirteen-year-old Bobby McCallister, two teen boys being raised by their strong-willed mother Grace in a small Missouri college town. Grace is a history professor at the local university and has an unconventional approach to parenting, which includes discouraging her sons from watching TV. Elder brother Jack is popular and a star on the track team, while Bobby is nerdy and asthmatic. Each episode is interspersed with flash-forwards from a documentary about the life of President McCallister, who would take office in the 2040s. The documentary clips feature interviews with members of the McCallister administration reflecting on the president's years in office and how his formative experiences shaped his later life and how he governed. It is not revealed which of the McCallister brothers would later become president until the end of the pilot episode.

== Cast and characters ==
=== Main cast ===
- Christine Lahti as Professor Grace McCallister
- Matt Long as Jack McCallister
- Logan Lerman as Robert "Bobby" McCallister, future President of the United States (2041–2049)
  - Tim Robbins voiced the future President McCallister in the series finale
- Jessica Paré as Courtney Benedict, the future First Lady of the United States
  - Brenda Wehle portrays the future Courtney McCallister in a recurring role
- Edwin Hodge as Marcus Ride, the future senior counsel of President McCallister
  - Ron Canada portrays the future Marcus Ride in a recurring role
- John Slattery as Peter Benedict, the new college president and Courtney's widowed father
  - Norman Lear guest starred as the future Peter Benedict
- Keri Lynn Pratt as Missy Belknap (episodes 2–20)
- Bradley Cooper as Tom Wexler Graham (episodes 4–17)

=== Recurring cast ===
- Dean Collins as Warren Feide, Bobby's best friend
  - Harry Groener guest starred as an adult Warren Feide in one episode
- Mike Erwin as Nate Edmonds, Courtney's former boyfriend
- Cam Gigandet as Randy Bongard, Missy's on-and-off boyfriend
- Kyle Gallner as BJ Bongaro, Bobby's "frenemy"
- Kate Mara as Katie Tokoleta, Jack's former girlfriend
- John Heard as Dennis Morgenthal
- Ed Begley Jr. as Reverend Belknap, Missy's father
- Jeanette Brox as Dex Truggman, Bobby's former girlfriend

== Development ==
The idea for the series was conceived by novelist Brad Meltzer and Steve Cohen, the latter who served as deputy communications director in Hillary Clinton's office during her husband's tenure as president. In 2002, Meltzer and Cohen pitched their idea to Thomas Schlamme, then an executive producer on The West Wing. The WB agreed to produce the series and Schlamme brought on Dawson's Creek alum Greg Berlanti as well as Berlanti's Everwood colleague Vanessa Taylor to write the pilot episode.

Taylor said her writing on the pilot was informed by her feelings about current events, particularly the Iraq War and the failed search for weapons of mass destruction. Taylor said at the time, "I just feel that we've come into an era in which there's a certain brazenness about lying to the American public. Which, in turn, has fostered a certain degree of cynicism and apathy." The show's title is meant to "evoke the hopefulness of the Camelot era."

Berlanti said he intended to eschew the use of the words "Democrat" and "Republican" in the pilot to "avoid criticism...based on partisan politics." He added that the show's emphasis on the boys' formative years "underscores how life's seemingly insignificant events can 'have ripple effects on the future that are exponential.'"

Though the character of Grace does not steer her sons towards a particular ideology, the series creators said the show would not avoid taking stands on certain issues. Said Schlamme, "Besides the personal stories, [Jack & Bobby] allows us to talk about thematic elements that are existing in 2004 America, which is race, which is religion, which is war, and kind of get: How did these little snapshots of his life right now affect the future of the world? And then we get to see how, in fact, they could affect the future of the world."

The WB ordered 13 episodes of Jack & Bobby prior to mid-May 2004 when TV networks traditionally unveil their fall season lineups, which garnered the new series advance buzz as the first show to be picked up for the 2004 fall season. The WB acquired the show as part of a wider attempt to cultivate older audiences beyond teenagers.

== Episodes ==
No.	Title	Directed by	Written by	Original release date	U.S. viewers (millions)
1	"Pilot"	David Nutter	Story by : Greg Berlanti & Vanessa Taylor and Steven A. Cohen & Brad Meltzer; Teleplay by : Greg Berlanti and Vanessa Taylor	September 12, 2004	4.71
Jack and Bobby McCallister are two bright young brothers growing up in Hart, Missouri, under the watchful eye of their eccentric single mother Grace, a college professor whose strong personality helps shape both of these young men's lives and secure one a place in the history books - as President of the United States. Grace and Jack's temperamental mother/son relationship takes a dangerous toll on Bobby as he gets caught in their rival forces, prompting a major change in the McCallister household. The arrival of a new college president, Peter Benedict, and his daughter, Courtney, makes an impression on the McCallister boys. In the year 2049, a documentary about the life of President Robert "Bobby" McAllister examines the photograph that would come to define his presidency.
2	"Better Days"	Mick Jackson	Story by : Greg Berlanti & Vanessa Taylor; Teleplay by : Vanessa Taylor	September 19, 2004	3.08
Grace and Bobby help with a College Democrats rally. Jack explodes after catching Grace smoking pot again and gives her an ultimatum. One of Grace's co-workers gets fired, and Grace goes to bat for her without all the facts in hand. Jack continues to explore his relationship with Courtney while attracting the attention of his ex, Missy Belknap. Meanwhile, Bobby tries to help make things better for Jack, both with Courtney and in school, but only succeeds in making things worse. Future interviews reveal President McCallister's surprising political allegiance.
3	"The Kindness of Strangers"	David Nutter	Michael Green	September 26, 2004	3.25
Bobby joins the "challenge program" at school and learns a powerful lesson. Jack plans a party at the house while Grace is away. Grace is conflicted on what to do when she finds out her student TA plagiarized one of her papers and in a separate instance, Grace is startled by news from Bobby's teacher regarding Jack. Lastly, the flash-forward segments reveal how a surprising ally helps President McCallister at a critical moment in his political career.
4	"A Man of Faith"	Peter Markle	Maggie Friedman	October 3, 2004	2.46
Bobby's interest in religion is piqued when he helps Warren study for his Bar Mitzvah and asks why Grace never took him to church. Elsewhere, Grace insults Hebba, an Arab-American female student with deep religious beliefs, which prompts a campus-wide boycott of her classes. Jack gets a chance to rejoin the track team when the coach needs a replacement runner for Marcus, who is on academic probation. In the future, President McCallister struggles with his faith.
5	"The First Lady"	David Petrarca	Jonathan Lisco	October 10, 2004	2.53
The future reveals a dark secret about the soon-to-be First Lady. Back in the present, Jack offers to escort a depressed Courtney to her father's work fundraiser leading to an unexpected confession and kiss. Bobby is having problems with another school bully. Meanwhile, much to the consternation of her sons, Grace offers to let a homeless man stay at their house for a few days until she can find him a better place to live.
6	"An Innocent Man"	Thomas Schlamme	Marc Guggenheim	October 17, 2004	2.25
Grace is stunned after Benedict informs her that her colleague and good friend has been accused of sexually harassing a student. Grace immediately defends her co-worker but must re-think her loyalty when new evidence arises. Meanwhile, Bobby is spending so much time with his new girlfriend causing him to neglect his school work. Under pressure from Grace to succeed, Bobby cheats on his test. Still reeling from the guilt of kissing Courtney, Jack is horrified to discover she has become friends with Missy. In the future, a gesture of forgiveness from President McCallister helps to heal his cabinet, but the decision comes at a price.
7	"Valentino"	John David Coles	Steven A. Cohen and Brad Meltzer	October 27, 2004	3.02
Bobby's relationship with Dex continues to grow until Grace walks in on them kissing in her study. After failing to convince Bobby to break it off with Dex, Grace and Jack take matters into their own hands. Meanwhile, Peter shows his overprotective side when Courtney considers going out with a college frat boy, and though he has Courtney's best interests at heart, it ultimately causes her embarrassment among her peers. In the future, the oldest of President McCallister's four sons, Jack, has a troublesome encounter with the Secret Service.
8	"Election Night"	Keith Samples	Erik Oleson	November 3, 2004	2.34
Bobby is heartbroken over his break-up with Dex and decides to get even with Jack after finding out he was responsible for their split. To get even, Bobby's subsequent actions cause Jack, Missy and Courtney much embarrassment and anger, resulting in a feud between the brothers. Meanwhile, Grace, waiting to see who won the 2004 presidential election, sneaks out of the election night party to smoke pot with Tom, which proves to be a terrible mistake for Grace and her family. In the year 2049, political leaders talk about the night President McCallister won the 2040 election by only a few votes. Three different endings were filmed to coincide with the actual results of the 2004 U.S. presidential election.
9	"Chess Lessons"	David Petrarca	Jonathan Lisco	November 10, 2004	2.52
Grace promises to be on her best behavior when she and Jack go to Missy's house for dinner, but she loses her cool after Reverend Belknap starts attacking her political ideals. Upset by the event, Grace turns to Tom and the two share a romantic moment. Bobby intentionally loses at chess games with Peter in order to spend more time with him. Courtney uses Marcus to get back at Jack. In the future, President McCallister uses chess as his way of strategizing a war.
10	"The Lost Boys"	Bryan Gordon	Barbie Kligman	November 17, 2004	2.83
Grace's warm, intelligent, gay younger brother, Jimmy, makes a surprise visit for Thanksgiving. At first, she is thrilled by his visit, but her feelings change after Jimmy lands in jail on drug charges. The suicide of one Jack's teammates shocks the school and has a profound impact on Jack. In the future, President McCallister must break the news to a soldier's parents that their son won't be home for the holidays.
11	"Today I Am a Man"	Michael Schultz	Michael Green	December 1, 2004	2.12
Jack is mortified after Grace catches him buying condoms in preparation for a big night with Missy. Trying to be supportive of his actions, Grace insists that Jack talk to her about sex and questions him about whether he is sure Missy is the right girl. Meanwhile, Jimmy slips back into old habits, forcing Grace to make a difficult decision about her family. Also, Bobby tries to help Warren win over his crush, Deena, but is surprised when she reveals she has feelings for Bobby. In the future, a critical speech plagued by technical errors forces President McCallister to improvise.
12	"Running Scared"	Perry Lang	Marc Guggenheim and Erik Oleson	January 26, 2005	1.83
Jack tries to resume a sense of normalcy after his brutal attack, but finds that the injury may keep him from returning to his old life when he visits the doctor. Grace accidentally runs into one of her students, Natalie, while she is leaving Tom's apartment, and may get busted as Natalie tries to subliminally blackmail Grace with her grade in a later conversation. Meanwhile, Courtney meets a college student who's tied up in front of her house as a fraternity hazing. He captures her interest and Courtney tries to get to know him, but his feelings for her create new complications. The future reveals President McCallister's unique actions after a horrific bombing in Chicago.
13	"A New Frontier"	David Petrarca	Maggie Friedman	February 2, 2005	3.12
Bobby becomes suspicious of Grace's relationship with Tom after Tom coincidentally shows up during a camping trip. Jack and Missy's relationship seems to be coming to an end as he competes with Truman High's football captain Randy for Missy's affection. Courtney's dating life is heating up with college freshman Nate. Jack befriends a patient, Katie, who also goes to school with him, while in the waiting room of the doctor's office. In deleted scenes cut for time, the future details President McCallister's risky decision to fund a space program to explore the planet Mars.
14	"Into the Woods"	Perry Lang	Michael Green and Jonathan Lisco	February 9, 2005	2.23
Bobby convinces Grace to allow him to attend a hunting trip with Peter by blackmailing her with threats to tell Jack about her relationship with Tom. His hunting experience with Peter proves to be an eye-opening experience. Jack walks in on Grace and Tom in a compromising situation and later tells Grace of his disapproval. He also begins hanging out with Katie as he adjusts to Missy and Randy coming together. Meanwhile, Courtney contemplates moving her relationship with Nate forward. In the future, the introduction of a non-lethal gun causes a political and ethical dilemma for President McCallister.
15	"Time Out of Life"	Michael Katleman	Vanessa Taylor and Marc Guggenheim	February 16, 2005	2.29
A bad snow storm hits Hart. Grace and Tom's relationship is exposed when a fellow professor catches them kissing in her office. Later in the evening, Peter turns to Grace for advice when he finds out Courtney is having sex with her boyfriend. In an effort to become popular at school, Bobby and Warren decide to have a sleepover and come up with a shocking idea to make the evening memorable, with Tom supervising. Meanwhile, Jack's relationship with Katie progresses as the two are trapped with Courtney, Nate, Randy and Missy due to the storm. In the future, the First Lady and President McCallister return to Hart for the dedication of a library at the university named after Grace. The First Lady discusses confronting the President regarding rumors of his affair with Vice President Karen Carmichael, and reveals the last conversation she ever had with Grace.
16	"And Justice for All"	David Petrarca	Erik Oleson	February 23, 2005	2.13
Peter is forced to take action after learning about the relationship between Grace and Tom, causing Grace to go up against the University Ethics Committee. While doing odd jobs in the neighborhood, Bobby and Warren discover the wallet that was stolen from Jack during his attack. Upon hearing this, Jack and Marcus consider their options. In the future, President McCallister faces criticism from a former president.
17	"Querida Grace"	Arvin Brown	Barbie Kligman	March 2, 2005	1.89
Bobby must research his family history for a school assignment, which leads to more unanswered questions about his father's real life. Jack and Katie's relationship progresses, while Courtney's comes to a screeching halt after Jack discovers Nate is cheating on her with another girl. Grace and Tom face the reality of their relationship as she is shocked to learn that her affair with Tom has cost her more than she had bargained for. In the future, SUNY at Binghamton history professor Preston Phelps uncovers the truth about President McCallister's father and his relationship with Grace.
18	"Friends with Benefits"	Sheldon Larry	Jonathan Lisco	April 13, 2005	1.54
Grace is now working with a new TA, Margaret, and feels at a loss without Tom. To add to her consternation, Grace was to be the opening speaker at an event for her mentor, Julius Edelman, but is later asked not to speak due to her scandalous relationship with Tom. Jack shows disapproval when he finds out Bobby is trying out for the track team. Later, Jack finds out that his relationship with Katie isn't what he thought it was and is shocked to find out that Courtney and Marcus may have feelings for each other. Missy joins a Bible study group after her break up with Randy. In the future, Senator Dennis Morgenthal discusses President McCallister's struggle to fill the seat of the beloved Chief Justice of the Supreme Court.
19	"A Child of God"	Ellen S. Pressman	Vanessa Taylor	April 20, 2005	1.83
Reverend Belknap threatens to disown his daughter after Missy and Jack go to the school nurse and find out she's pregnant. Missy eventually finds unlikely guidance from Grace. Bobby's attempts to delve further into religion prove more complicated than he anticipated.
20	"Under the Influence"	Perry Lang	Michael Green and Steven A. Cohen	April 27, 2005	2.04
After getting into a big argument at the school dance with Katie, Jack heads to an after-party with Courtney, Marcus, Randy and Missy, but a deadly car crash prevents them from making it to their destination. Meanwhile, Grace agrees to chaperone Bobby's school field trip, much to Bobby's dismay, in what proves to be a hurtful and eye-opening experience for Grace. In the future, President McCallister's eldest son, John "Jack" McCallister, discusses the death of his younger brother Henry at age 16 in a drunk driving crash.
21	"Stand by Me"	David Paymer	Wendy Mericle	May 4, 2005	2.23
To protect Marcus, Jack tells the police that he was driving the car the night Missy died, but the guilt becomes too much. Meanwhile, the group's sadness turns to outrage after Reverend Belknap delivers a shocking eulogy at his daughter's funeral. Bobby and Warren say goodbye to each other as Warren moves away, promising to stay in touch. In the future, an adult Warren talks about meeting with his former best friend and the deeper motives to their reunion.
22	"Legacy"	Michael Schultz	Story by : Vanessa Taylor and Michael Green; Teleplay by : Maggie Friedman and Marc Guggenheim	May 11, 2005	2.08
Jack and Bobby discover that Grace plans to visit their father, Juan, in a Texas prison. Though Bobby is most adamant about seeing their father, Jack is the brother who meets him, feeling responsible for him abandoning the family. During their meeting, Juan reveals that he is in prison for murder, but hints he was unjustly convicted, giving Jack the motivation to pursue his future career. Jack and Courtney finally reveal their true feelings for each other. In the future, the documentary host reveals Jack's fate: fighting in the War of the Americas where he became a war hero, later a public defender, elected to Congress and finally to his untimely death, setting off Bobby's political journey.

== Reception ==
=== Critical reception ===
The show was acclaimed by multiple critics and outlets. On review aggregator website Rotten Tomatoes, the show has a rating of 88% based on 16 critical reviews. Rob Owen of the Pittsburgh Post-Gazette wrote Jack & Bobby is "undoubtedly the most grown-up series" aired by the youth-skewing WB network and called it "an absorbing drama with hints of the idealism found in early seasons of 'The West Wing.'"

Alessandra Stanley of The New York Times wrote the show "could have been just another coming-of-age tale of teenagers growing up in a small town with an overbearing single mother," but its historical framing sets it apart. She wrote, "'Jack & Bobby' is unusual in many ways, and one is that unlike so many modern shows it is cynical about television but deeply romantic about politics and public service...moments of misty patriotic yearning are leavened with sharp dialogue and self-mocking asides, including some at the expense of other WB series. (On tonight's episode, Jack sarcastically tells his mother that their family is 'straight out of '7th Heaven.')"

Stanley praised Christine Lahti's performance in particular, writing "Ms. Lahti is an actress who works the underlayers of each role and resists the pull of easy sentiment. Grace is a complicated, strong woman who is sympathetic without being quite likable, and that makes both her bond with Bobby (he helps her match her outfits) and her tensely hostile relationship with Jack plausible."

Writing for Entertainment Weekly, Gillian Flynn gave the show a grade of A− and said, "On a grand scale, 'Jack & Bobby' reflects the American obsession with picking apart our childhoods ad nauseam for clues to the adults we become." In The New Yorker, Nancy Franklin likened the show to a mix between The Wonder Years and The West Wing, concluding it "is most emotionally effective when the lines that are drawn between Bobby's boyhood and his adulthood meander through unexpected oxbows."

James Poniewozik of Time found the documentary flash-forwards to be distracting, but said it's "a smart, well-written show that constantly subverts our expectations, and it takes a rare demographic risk."

A plot line about the parentage of Jack and Bobby, in which the mother had hid the fact that the boy's father was "just a Mexican dishwasher", received criticism from the Los Angeles Times and was described by The New Yorker as implausibly convenient.

=== Awards and nominations ===
Year	Award	Category	Recipient	Result	Ref.
2005	Art Directors Guild Awards	Excellence in Production Design for Single-Camera Series	Dina Lipton and Marc Dabe for "An Innocent Man"	Nominated	
2005	Casting Society of America	Outstanding Achievement in Dramatic Pilot Casting	Patrick J. Rush for "Pilot"	Nominated	
2005	GLAAD Media Awards	Outstanding Individual Episode (In a Series Without a Regular Gay Character)	Episode: "The Lost Boys"	Won	
2005	People's Choice Awards	Favorite New Television Drama	Jack & Bobby	Nominated	
2005	Golden Globe Awards	Best Performance by an Actress in a Television Series — Drama	Christine Lahti	Nominated	
2005	Screen Actors Guild Awards	Outstanding Performance by a Female Actor in a Drama Series	Christine Lahti	Nominated	
2005	Young Artist Awards	Best Performance in a TV Series (Comedy or Drama) - Leading Young Actor	Logan Lerman	Won (Note: Tied.)	

=== Cancelation ===
Despite critical acclaim and a strong start, the show was not a successful ratings draw for the network, averaging only 2.7 million weekly viewers, and was canceled by The WB on May 17, 2005. This has been partly attributed to its airing in the same Sunday night time slot as popular primetime series Desperate Housewives. The WB changed its time slot to Wednesdays, though the ratings did not improve as it was then competing against The West Wing, The Bachelor, and American Idol.

To date, physical home media for the series has not been released, but it has intermittently been made available for digital purchase on Amazon and iTunes. In 2026, Jack & Bobby is available for streaming on Hulu.

== See also ==
- Lists of fictional presidents of the United States
- Diary of a Future President
