= Kay Mellor =

English actress and director (1951–2022)

Kay Mellor OBE
- Born: Kay Daniel; 11 May 1951; Leeds, West Riding of Yorkshire, England
- Died: 15 May 2022 (aged 71); Leeds, West Yorkshire, England
- Occupations: Actress; Writer; Producer; Director
- Spouse: Anthony Mellor (m. 1968)
- Children: 2, including Gaynor Faye

Kay Mellor OBE (née Daniel; 11 May 1951 – 15 May 2022) was an English actress, scriptwriter, producer and director. She was known for creating television series such as Band of Gold (ITV, 1995–97), Fat Friends (ITV, 2000–05), and The Syndicate (BBC, 2012–21), as well as co-creating CITV's children's dramas Children's Ward (1989–2000) and Just Us (1992–94).

== Early life ==
Kay Daniel was born in Leeds on 11 May 1951, to a Catholic father, George, and a Jewish mother, Dinah. Her parents' marriage was unhappy, and Dinah suffered from George's domestic violence. She had an affair before seeking a divorce. She raised her children as a single parent in Ireland Wood and kept the affair a secret for more than 30 years.

In 1967, Mellor become pregnant aged 16 and married the child's father, Anthony Mellor, who was 17. The couple had two daughters, television producer Yvonne Francas (born 1968) and actress Gaynor Faye (born 1971).

When Mellor told her mother about being pregnant, she made her daughter promise to go back to her education later, should she get the chance. Mellor did so when her children were at school age, passing her O-levels and A-levels. She went on to Bretton Hall College and graduated with a BA Hons degree in 1983.

== Career ==
As a writer, she began working for Granada Television in the 1980s, writing for the soap opera Coronation Street. In 1989, Mellor also wrote many episodes for the Channel 4 soap Brookside.

Mellor wrote for the anthology drama series Dramarama before co-creating the long-running children's drama Children's Ward with her Coronation Street colleague Paul Abbott in 1988. The series was awarded Best Children's Drama in the 1997 BAFTA Awards. She also created the soap opera Families which aired from 1990 until 1993, and wrote and starred in three series of the family show Just Us (1992–1994). She wrote the television drama serials Band of Gold (1995), Playing the Field (1998), Fat Friends (2000), Between the Sheets (2003), and Strictly Confidential (2006).

Commenting on the casting for Fat Friends, Mellor said she had wanted genuinely large people to play the parts, calling Ruth Jones and James Corden "the real McCoy". Mellor had seen Corden in a Tango advert and asked her casting director Beverley Keogh to find him for her because she thought he was perfect for the part.

In a parallel career as a television actress, Mellor appeared in her own adaptation of Jane Eyre (1997), and in other series and films such as the comedy drama Stan the Man (2002), A Good Thief (2002) and Gifted (2003). On stage, Kay acted in Three Girls in Blue and she wrote and starred in the one-woman show Queen at the West Yorkshire Playhouse.

In July 2006, Mellor's The Chase aired on BBC One. She wrote and directed the two-part drama A Passionate Woman which was based on her 1992 stage play and was broadcast on BBC One in April 2010. The play was inspired by her parents' marriage.

In 2012, she wrote another BBC drama, The Syndicate, which ran for four series until 2021. It was set and filmed in Leeds, Bradford, Scarborough and Monaco.

In 2013 The Syndicate was remade in the United States as Lucky 7, but was cancelled after one series.

In 2014, her BBC series In the Club was first broadcast followed by a second series in 2016. Mellor's drama series Love, Lies and Records ran on BBC One in November and December 2017, starring Rebecca Front and Ashley Jensen. Her ITV drama series Girlfriends, starring Zoë Wanamaker, Miranda Richardson and Phyllis Logan, premiered in January 2018. The fourth series of The Syndicate aired in March 2021 with a cast including Neil Morrissey, Katherine Rose Morley, Kieran Urquhart, Taj Atwal, Liberty Hobbs, Emily Head, Gaynor Faye, Kym Marsh, Katie McGlynn, Mark Benton, Lorraine Bruce, and Joe Sugg.

She was awarded the BAFTA Dennis Potter Award in 1997 for Outstanding Writing for Television.

Mellor was appointed Officer of the Order of the British Empire (OBE) in the 2009 Birthday Honours and, in 2015, she was awarded the Writers' Guild of Great Britain Award for Outstanding Contribution to Writing. In 2016, Mellor was made a Fellow of the Royal Television Society and, in February 2020, Mellor was awarded Broadcast's Special Recognition Award.

She was the subject of This Is Your Life in 2000 when she was surprised by Michael Aspel. She also appeared on the BBC's Desert Island Discs in 2017.

Outside of television, Mellor wrote screenplays for feature films such as Girls' Night starring Julie Walters, Brenda Blethyn and Kris Kristofferson, which played at the Sundance Film Festival in 1998. She both wrote and directed the feature film Fanny and Elvis starring Ray Winstone, which won the Audience Prize at the Dinard British Film Festival, and one off drama Some Kind of Life, which was BAFTA nominated for Best Single Drama in 1997.

In 2017, Mellor turned Fat Friends into a stage musical with Nick Lloyd Webber writing the music. Fat Friends The Musical toured the UK in 2017, and then again in 2022. Mellor subsequently adapted Band of Gold for the stage, which premiered in Mellor's hometown of Leeds in 2019, and toured the UK until it was shut down early due to the COVID-19 pandemic.

== Personal life and death ==
Mellor liked going to Roundhay Park, Golden Acre Park, and the Cottage Road Cinema in Leeds. She was also a frequent visitor and supporter of the National Science and Media Museum in Bradford.

Mellor died in Leeds on 15 May 2022, aged 71.

== Tribute ==
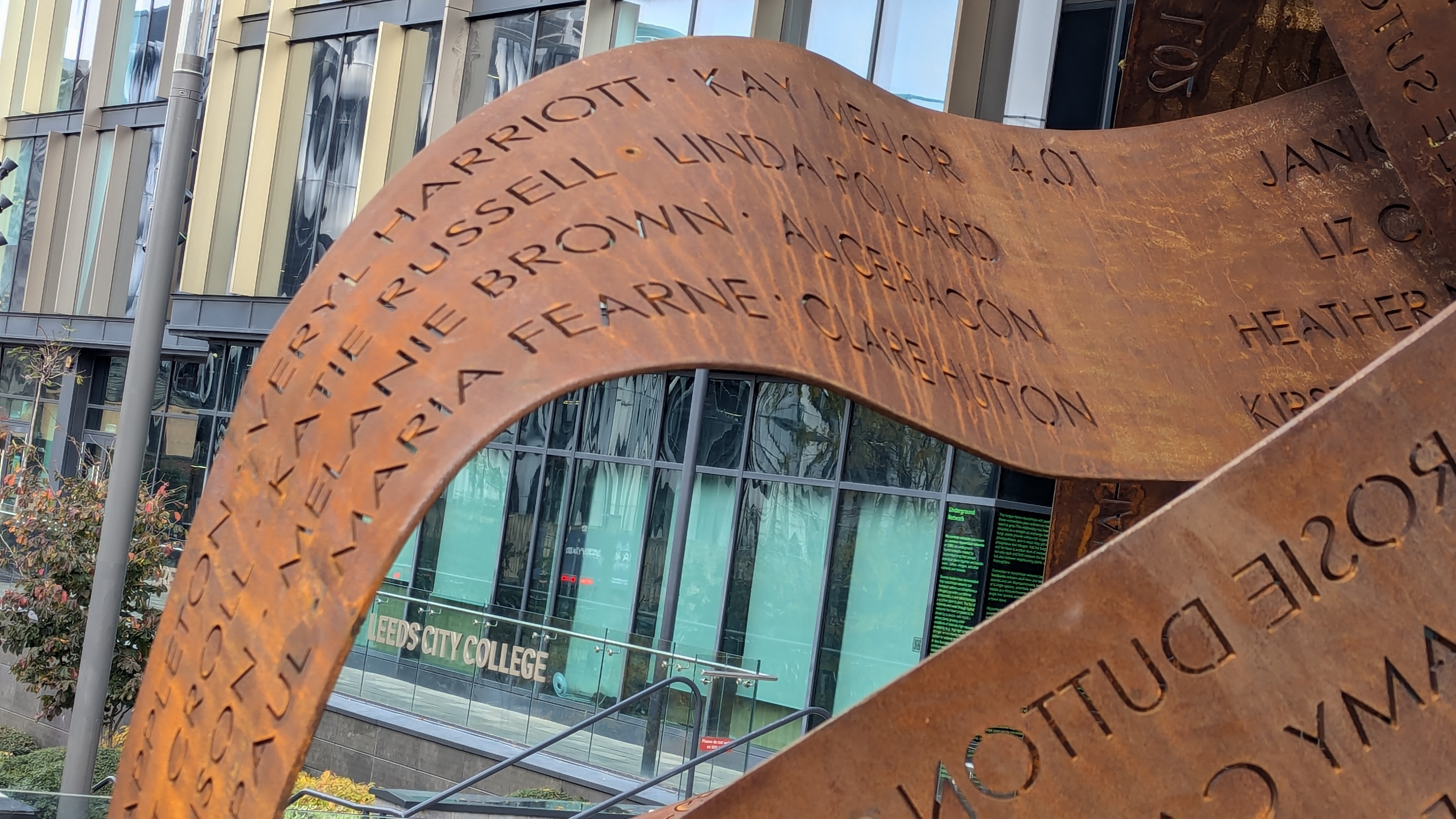
Segment of Ribbons sculpture, featuring names of geologist Maria Fearne, Alice Bacon, Mel B and Mellor

Her name is on the Ribbons sculpture, an outdoor sculpture in Leeds, England, by Pippa Hale, which was unveiled on 12 October 2024.

== Selected filmography ==
Year	Title	Channel	Notes
1986	Albion Market	ITV	Writer and story editor
1987–1988	Dramarama	ITV	Writer
1988	Place of Safety	ITV	Writer
1990–1993	Families	ITV	
1992–1994	Just Us	ITV	
1995–1997	Band of Gold	ITV	
1996	Some Kind of Life	ITV	Writer
1997	Jane Eyre	ITV	Writer and actress
1998–2002	Playing the Field	BBC One	
1999	Fanny & Elvis	ITV	
2000–2005	Fat Friends	ITV	
2003	Between the Sheets	ITV	
2006	Strictly Confidential	ITV	
2006–2007	The Chase	BBC One	
2010	A Passionate Woman	BBC One	Also directed with Antonia Bird
2012–2021	The Syndicate	BBC One	Also directed with Dominic LeClerc
2014–2016	In the Club	BBC One	Also directed
2017	Love, Lies and Records	BBC One	
2017–2018	Fat Friends The Musical	UK Theatre Tour	Also directed
2018	Girlfriends	ITV	Also directed
