= Don't Stop Now - It's Fundation =

Don't Stop Now – It's Fundation
- Genre: Comedy radio
- Running time: 30 minutes
- Country of origin: United Kingdom
- Home station: BBC Radio 4
- Starring: Gareth Hale; Norman Pace; Terry Morrison; Joe Griffiths; Victy Silva; Maryanne Morgan
- Written by: Fundation; Charlie Adams; Geoffrey Atkinson
- Produced by: Alan Nixon
- Recording studio: Paris Theatre, London
- Original release: 29 December 1983 – 16 August 1986
- No. of series: 3
- No. of episodes: 24
- Audio format: Stereo

Don't Stop Now – It's Fundation is a BBC Radio 4 show starring Gareth Hale, Norman Pace, Terry Morrison, Joe Griffiths and Victy Silva, with Maryanne Morgan replacing Silva for the third series. It was billed as a non-stop comedy cabaret and comprised a mixture of sketches and humorous songs which were written by the cast along with Charlie Adams and Geoffrey Atkinson. The cast had been performing their material regularly for several years at The Tramshed in Woolwich, South East London as the ensemble Fundation when they were spotted at the Edinburgh Festival by radio producer Alan Nixon.

Recurring sketches included Thirty Second Theatre, Our Fascinating Universe with Rabid Attenborough, Bargain Basement, Falsies: Forged Diaries of the Famous (which spawned a book of the same name written by Hale, Pace and Adams), The Secret Diary of Alien Mole (Aged 13 Million and ¾ Light Years), The Two Rons and Billy and Johnny. The latter two pairings would later become regular characters on the Hale and Pace television series. Joe Griffiths provided accompaniment on the piano for the musical numbers which included the likes of Do You Want Kebab?, Go Reliant Robin, and Do It Yourself. In 1991, he reunited with Hale & Pace to take the blame for co-writing ''The Stonk''.

The show was popular enough with listeners to be recommissioned for three series but it was not liked by all critics.

== Series overview ==
Series	Episodes	Transmission date	
Series	Episodes	First episode	Last episode
Pilot		29 December 1983	
1	8	13 February 1984	2 April 1984
2	6	14 January 1985	18 February 1985
Special		17 December 1985	
3	8	28 June 1986	16 August 1986
