= Ashley Jensen =

Scottish actress and narrator (born 1969)

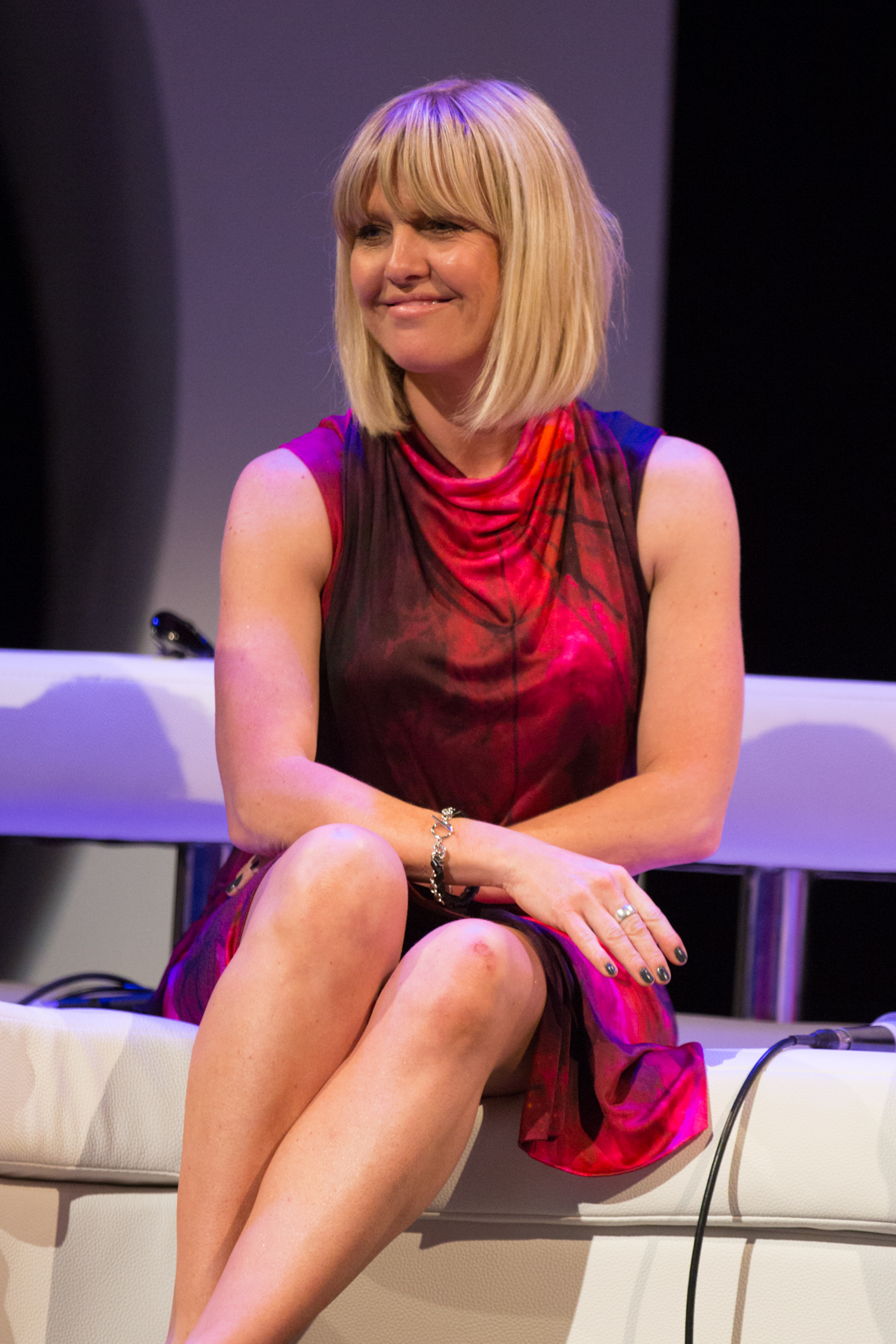
- Jensen in 2016
- Born: 11 August 1969 (age 57); Annan, Dumfriesshire, Scotland
- Education: Queen Margaret University, Edinburgh
- Occupations: Actress and narrator
- Years active: 1988–present
- Spouses: Terence Beesley (m. 2007; died 2017) Kenny Doughty (m. 2023)
- Children: 1

Ashley Jensen (born 11 August 1969) is a Scottish actress and narrator. She is best known as Maggie Jacobs in Extras (2005–2007), Christina McKinney in Ugly Betty (2006–2010), the title character in Agatha Raisin (2014–2022), and DI Ruth Calder in Shetland (2023–present).

For her role in Extras, Jensen was nominated for the Primetime Emmy Award for Outstanding Supporting Actress in a Miniseries or Movie in 2008.

== Career ==
Jensen was a member of the UK's National Youth Theatre before being selected to study and train in Drama at Edinburgh's Queen Margaret University.

Her first significant television role was as Clare Donnelly, daughter of Glasgow criminal Jo-Jo Donnelly (played by Billy Connolly) in the 1993 BBC drama Down Among the Big Boys. In 1994, she played eccentric secretary Rosie McConnichy in the final series of BBC comedy May to December, as a replacement for the character of secretary Hilary (Rebecca Lacey), and Heather in Roughnecks, a BBC television series about workers on a North Sea oil platform. Jensen had a small role in a Dangerfield episode "Contact" as the mother of a young girl with meningitis. She then appeared as Fiona Morris in EastEnders. She also appeared in the 2003 BBC drama Two Thousand Acres of Sky.

Jensen co-starred alongside Ricky Gervais in the BBC Two/HBO television programme Extras as the socially inept Maggie Jacobs. For her work on the first series, she received best television comedy actress and newcomer awards at the 2005 British Comedy Awards. In 2006, Jensen received two British Comedy Awards and a BAFTA nomination for her role in Extras. Her role in the 2007 Christmas Special earned her an Emmy Award nomination. In January 2006 she starred in the drama series Eleventh Hour on ITV. Later that year she played Steve Coogan's agent in A Cock and Bull Story. In 2007, she provided the narration for the film Taking Liberties.

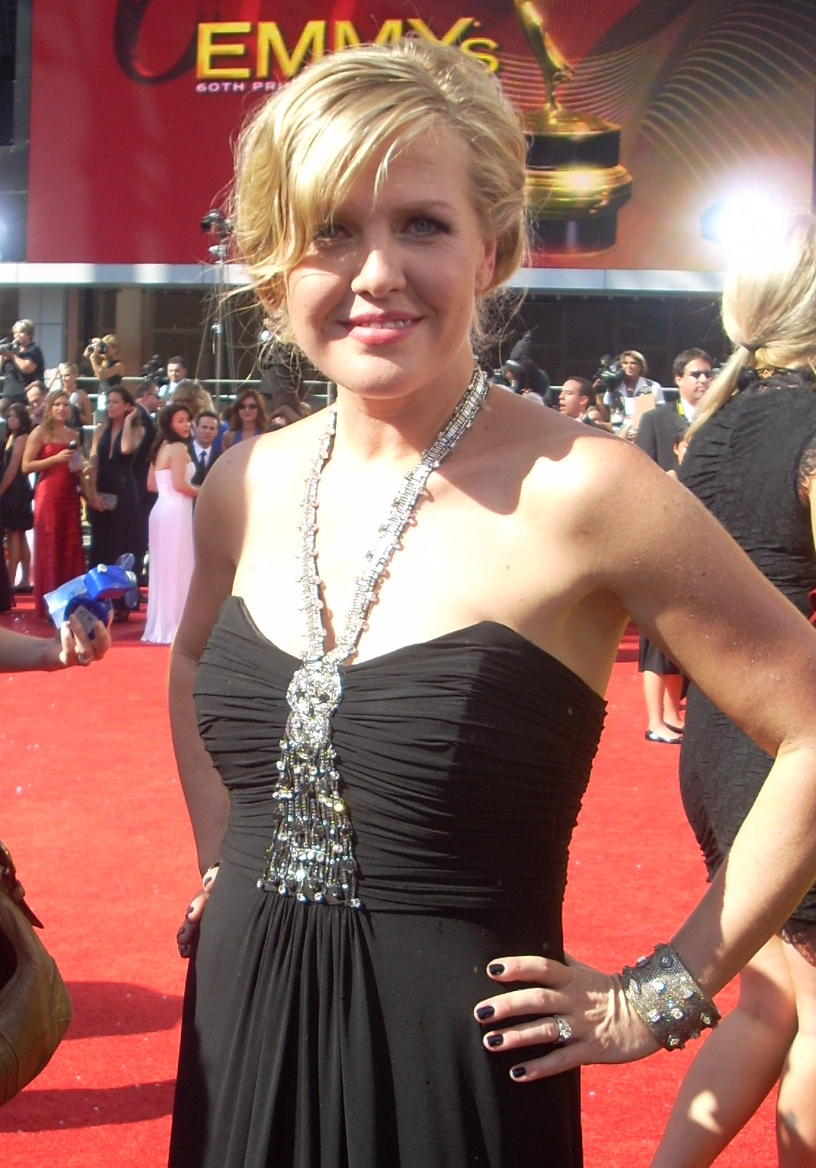
Jensen at the 60th Annual Emmy Awards, 21 September 2008

In September 2006, Jensen's first major role on American television came when she took the role of regular character Christina McKinney on the ABC series Ugly Betty. Her character was originally an American, but when she met the show's producers they liked Jensen's accent and changed the nationality of the character, keeping McKinney Scottish. Production of Ugly Betty moved to New York from Los Angeles in mid-2008, causing a conflict for Jensen, who was unable to relocate from Los Angeles and left the show in 2009 near the end of the third season but made a return guest appearance in 2010 during the fourth season.

In January 2009, Jensen starred in No Holds Bard, a BBC Scotland one-off special comedy shown on Burns Night as part of a line-up of special programming to mark the 250th birthday of Robert Burns. She is the narrator of Channel 4's Embarrassing Illnesses and Embarrassing Bodies. She also narrated an advertising campaign for Bank of Scotland and Persil detergent adverts for both television and radio. From September 2009 to May 2010, she appeared in the sitcom Accidentally on Purpose as Olivia. Jensen starred in the 2009 BBC comedy Nativity! as Jennifer Lore, a Hollywood producer's secretary and the love interest of Paul Maddens, played by Martin Freeman.

On 21 December 2010, she starred in the one-off/pilot BBC comedy drama Accidental Farmer, playing a London executive who buys a derelict farm with her philandering boyfriend's credit card. In 2011, she voiced Nanette the frog in the animated production Gnomeo & Juliet. She starred in the ITV drama The Reckoning in April of that year.

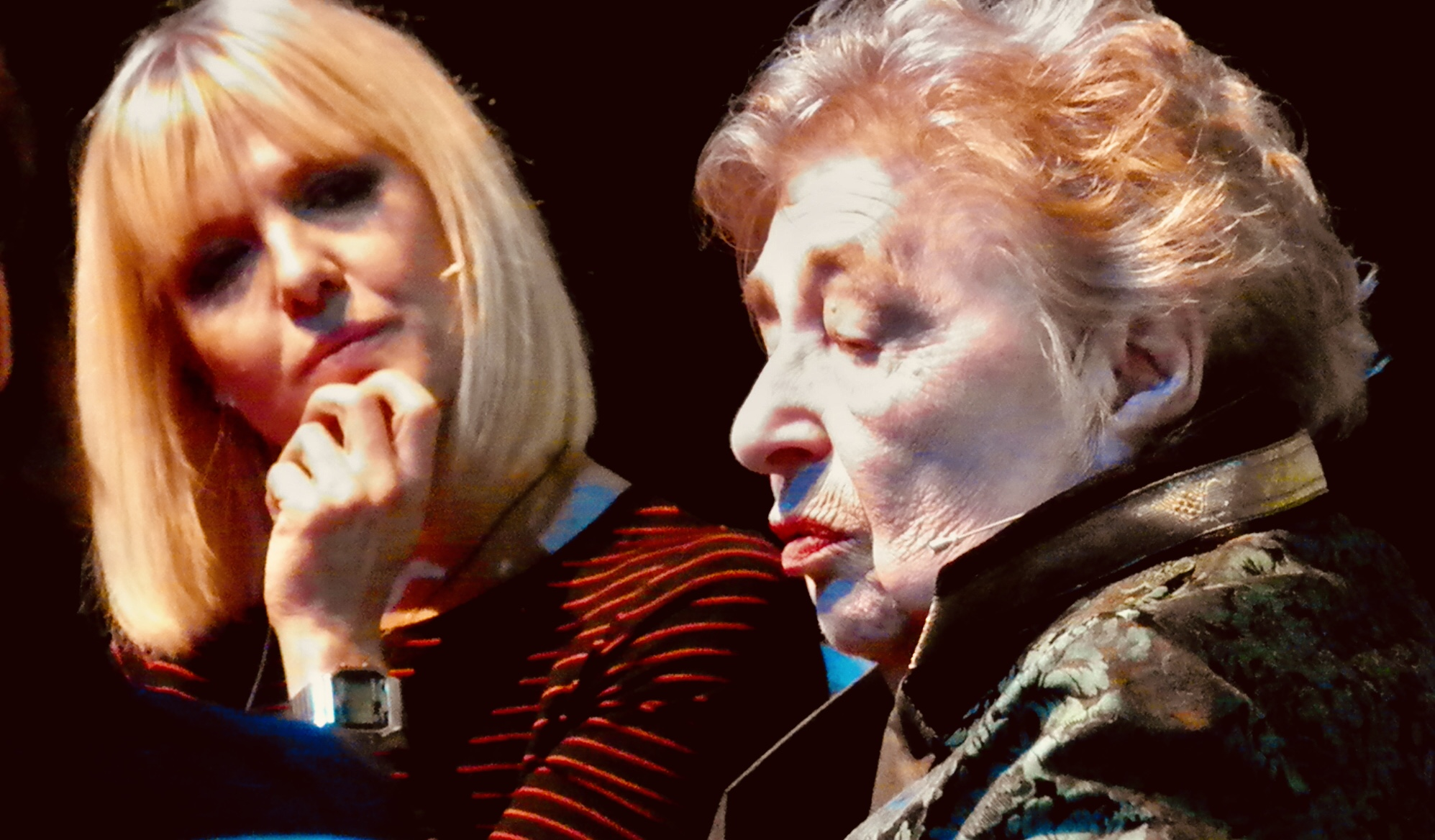
Ashley Jensen with Marion Chesney (M.C. Beaton) at Bloody Scotland Crime Writing Festival 2018

In 2014, she played the lead character in the television film adaptation of the M. C. Beaton novel Agatha Raisin and the Quiche of Death for Sky1. She also starred in the eight-part series that first aired on Sky1 on 7 June 2016.

From 2015 to 2019, Jensen acted in Catastrophe, a comedy series for Channel 4, and with Susan Calman in Calman's BBC Radio 4 comedy series Sisters.

In 2017, she starred in a six-part TV series for BBC TV, Love, Lies & Records, depicting the gritty life and entwined storylines working in Leeds Registry Office. In March 2019, Jensen reunited with Gervais in the Netflix black comedy series After Life, a role she continued for all three series. In April 2019 she played Debbie Dorell in the second series of BBC TV drama Trust Me. When an injured soldier discovers patients in his hospital ward dying, he attempts to investigate the suspicious deaths. Also in 2019, she played the voice of Jacqueline in Lady and the Tramp.

In November 2022 she was announced as the new lead in the BBC drama Shetland.

Jensen also appeared in the 2022 Christmas film Christmas On Mistletoe Farm for Netflix.

== Personal life ==
Jensen was born in Annan to Ivar and Margaret Jensen, who were both from Glasgow. She has a half-sister and brother from her father's second marriage. She is of Danish and Scottish descent on her father's side and Scottish descent on her mother's. She attended Annan Academy.

Jensen has one son, born in October 2009, from her marriage to actor Terence Beesley, whom she met in 1999 while working on a stage production of King Lear. They married in January 2007 in Big Sur, California. Her husband died in November 2017, and an inquest found that he had taken his own life.

In August 2023, Jensen married actor Kenny Doughty at Priston Mill in Priston, near Bath, Somerset.

== Filmography ==
=== Film ===
Year	Title	Role	Notes
1991	Tickets for the Zoo	Eleanor	
1999	Topsy-Turvy	Miss Tringham	
2005	A Cock and Bull Story	Lindsey	
2007	Taking Liberties	Herself - Narrator	Documentary film
2009	Nativity!	Jennifer Lore	
2010	Sunshine	Alison	Short film. (Also producer and art director)
2010	How to Train Your Dragon	Phlegma the Fierce (voice)	
2011	Gnomeo & Juliet	Nanette (voice)	
2011	Hysteria	Fannie	
2011	Arthur Christmas	Bryony (voice)	Nominated – Annie Award for Voice Acting in a Feature Production
2012	The Pirates! In an Adventure with Scientists!	The Surprisingly Curvaceous Pirate (voice)	
2013	All Stars	Gina	
2014	Small Time	Gail	
2015	The Lobster	Biscuit Woman	
2015	The Legend of Barney Thomson	Detective Inspector June Robertson	
2018	Sherlock Gnomes	Nanette (voice)	
2019	How to Train Your Dragon: The Hidden World	Phlegma (voice)	
2019	Lady and the Tramp	Jock (voice)	
2022	Christmas on Mistletoe Farm	Ms. Fletcher	

=== Television ===
Year	Title	Role	Notes
1990	City Lights	Moira	Series 5; Episode 6: "The Front"
1991	Screen Two	Betting Shop Cashier	Series 7; Episode 10: "Dreaming"
1992	Rab C. Nesbitt	2nd Girl	Series 2; Episode 1: "Country"
1993	Rab C. Nesbitt	Sheena	Series 3; Episode 4: "Wean"
1993	Screen One	Claire Donnelly	Series 5; Episode 3: "Down Among the Big Boys"
1994	May to December	Rosie McConnachy	Series 6; Episodes 1–6
1994	The Tales of Para Handy	Catriona MacLean	Episode 4: "A Night Alarm"
1994	Takin' Over the Asylum	Kathleen	Mini-series; Episode 1: "Hey Jude"
1994–1995	Roughnecks	Heather	Series 1 & 2; 13 episodes
1994	The Bill	Kate Selby	Series 10; Episode 85: "Personal Space"
1995	The Baldy Man	Hairdresser	Episode 6: "Hair/Crime"
1995	Waiting	Amanda Cookson	TV film
1995	Capital Lives	Eileen	Series 2; Episode 1: "Temp"
1996	The Big Picnic	Nessie	TV film
1996	Bad Boys	Morag Hood	Episodes 1–6
1996	Casualty	Jess	Series 11; Episode 4: "Thicker Than Water"
1997	The Bill	Diane Wyre	Series 13; Episode 79: "Mid-Life Crisis"
1997	Dangerfield	Michelle Thomson	Series 4; Episode 8: "Contact"
1998	Mortimer's Law	Naomi Childs	Episode 5
1998–2000	City Central	PC Sue Chappell	Series 1–3; 31 episodes
2000	EastEnders	Fiona Morris	5 episodes
2001	Rebus	Mhairi Henderson	Episode 4: "Mortal Causes"
2001–2003	Clocking Off	Babs Fisher/Leach	Series 2–4; 5 episodes
2002	Outside the Rules	Dawn Deacon	TV film
2002	Breeze Block	Leanne	5 episodes
2003	Two Thousand Acres of Sky	Angie Reeburn	Series 3; Episodes 5–8
2003	Coming Up	Rachel	Episode 5: "Victoria"
2003	Silent Witness	DI Becky Metcalf	Series 7; Episodes 3 & 4: "Fatal Error: Parts 1 & 2"
2003	Sweet Medicine	Faye Brooks	Episodes 6–10
2004	Casualty	Stella	Series 18; Episodes 45 & 46: "Love, Honour and Betray" and "Ring of Truth"
2005	Meet the Magoons	Policewoman No. 1	Episode 3: "The Samosa Triangle"
2005	Taggart	Agatha Ferry	Series 22; Episode 2: "A Taste of Money"
2005–2007	Extras	Maggie Jacobs	Series 1 & 2; 13 episodes British Comedy Award for Best Newcomer; British Comedy Award for Best Television Comedy Actress (2005); Nominated – BAFTA Award for Best Comedy Performance; Nominated – Primetime Emmy Award for Outstanding Supporting Actress in a Miniseries or a Movie; Nominated – Broadcasting Press Guild Award for Best Actress; Nominated – British Comedy Award for Best Television Comedy Actress (2008); Nominated – Rose d'Or Award for Best Sitcom Performance (follower-up)
2006	Eleventh Hour	Rachel Young	Mini-series; Episodes 1–4
2006–2010	Ugly Betty	Christina McKinney	Regular role; Series 1–3 / Guest star; Series 4. 66 episodes Nominated – BAFTA Scotland Award for Best Acting Performance in Television; Nominated – Screen Actors Guild Award for Outstanding Performance by an Ensemble in a Comedy Series (2007, 2008)
2007	The Friday Night Project	Herself - Guest Host	Series 4; Episode 7
2007	Embarrassing Illnesses	Herself - Narrator	Episodes 1–8
2007	The Teen Choice Awards 2007	Herself - Presenter	TV Special
2007	Cook Yourself Thin	Herself - Narrator	Series 1; Episodes 1–6
2007–2009	Movie Connections	Herself - Narrator	Series 1 & 2; 16 episodes
2008	Embarrassing Bodies	Herself - Narrator	Series 1, 2 & 6; 6 episodes
2009	No Holds Bard	Isobel	TV film
2009–2010	Accidentally on Purpose	Olivia	Episodes 1–18
2010	Accidental Farmer	Erin Taylor	TV film
2010	Wallace & Gromit's World of Invention	Herself - Narrator	Episodes 1–6
2011	The Reckoning	Sally Wilson	Mini-series; Episodes 1 & 2
2013	Love and Marriage	Sarah Paradise	Episodes 1–6
2013	The Escape Artist	Kate Burton	Mini-series; Episodes 1–3: "Parts 1–3"
2013	Iceland Foods: Life in the Freezer Cabinet	Herself - Narrator	Episodes 1–3
2013–2014	CBeebies Bedtime Stories	Herself - Storyteller	3 episodes
2014–2022	Agatha Raisin	Agatha Raisin	Series 1–4; 20 episodes
2015–2019	Catastrophe	Fran	Series 1–4; 18 episodes
2017	Love, Lies and Records	Kate Dickenson	Episodes 1–6
2018	Sofia the First	Arielf (voice)	Series 4; Episode 25: "The Elf Situation"
2018–2020	DuckTales	Downy McDuck / Agnes McDuck / Danny McDuck (voice)	Series 1; Episode 21: "The Secret(s) of Castle McDuck!" and Series 3; Episode 17: "The Fight for Castle McDuck!"
2019	Trust Me	Debbie Dorrell	Series 2; Episodes 1–4
2019–2022	After Life	Nurse / Emma	Series 1–3; 18 episodes
2021	The Balmoral Hotel: An Extraordinary Year	Herself - Narrator	Documentary mini-series; Episodes 1–4
2021	Summer Camp Island	Miss Mary (voice)	Series 5; Episode 9: "Mildred's Friends"
2022	The Airport: Back in the Skies	Herself - Narrator	Documentary mini-series; Episodes 1–5
2022	Dog Squad	Meagaidh (voice)	Series 1; Episodes 2, 10 & 15
2022	Mayflies	Anna	Two-part drama; Episodes 1 & 2
2023–2024	Designing the Hebrides	Herself - Narrator	Series 1 & 2; 12 episodes
2023–present	Shetland	DI Ruth Calder	Series 8–12; 30 episodes Nominated – BAFTA Scotland Audience Award
2025	Man vs Baby	Janet	
2026	The Repair Shop	Herself - Narrator	The Repair Shop: Beyond The Barn
TBA	Rambling	Cat	Main role
