= Hale and Pace =

English comedy duo

- Genre: Comedy
- Written by: Gareth Hale; Norman Pace; Adrian Baldwin; Lenny Barker
- Directed by: Vic Finch; David G. Hillier; Peter Orton
- Starring: Gareth Hale; Norman Pace
- Country of origin: United Kingdom
- Original language: English
- No. of series: 10
- No. of episodes: 66

Production
- Producers: David G. Hillier; Alan Nixon; Mark Robson
- Running time: 30 minutes
- Production company: London Weekend Television

Original release
- Network: ITV
- Release: 2 October 1988 – 20 December 1998

Hale and Pace were an English comedy double-act that performed in clubs and on radio and television in the United Kingdom in the 1980s and 1990s. The duo was made up of Gareth Hale and Norman Pace, with the Hale and Pace television show running for ten years and 66 episodes, from 1988 to 1998.

== Early career ==
Gareth Hale (born 15 January 1953) and Norman Pace (born 17 February 1953) met at Avery Hill teacher-training college in Eltham, South-East London. After five years in education, they moved to entertainment in the late 1970s. They performed mostly in the Tramshed in Woolwich, London for seven years. This developed into sketch-writing, with a show entitled Don't Stop Now - It's Fundation. Before appearing on TV, they did a series of radio shows for Radio 4 based on their show at the Tramshed. Their early TV breaks came on The Entertainers (1984) and Pushing Up Daisies (1984), and they went on to appear in the Channel 4 sketch show Coming Next (1985) and Saturday Gang (1986). They also appeared in The Young Ones three times, in the episodes "Flood", "Nasty" and "Time".

== London Weekend Television show ==
After a one-off special for London Weekend Television at Christmas 1986, they were given a full series in 1988. The first series won the Silver Rose of Montreux, as well as the Press prize. Their ITV series ran for a decade, with most of the programmes going out around 10 pm on a Sunday. The show is a mixture of sketches and stand-up. The series was also notable for its amount of musical numbers with every episode featuring at least one original song performed by Hale and/or Pace.

Their most famous comic creations are the stone-faced bouncers The Two Rons (not to be confused with The Two Ronnies), who are also known as The Management and for using the phrase 'I do do wrong, Ron, I do do wrong' in their stilted conversations in a reference to the song "Da Doo Ron Ron" by The Crystals. The Two Rons' studio sketches either take place on some dimly-lit stairs next to the bouncers' venue or above Hale and Pace, where they have been keeping an eye on proceedings. In later series, The Two Rons are filmed on-location with Ron & Ron's Gardening Tips having the duo dispense thuggish wisdom about plants and flowers.

Hale and Pace are also known for their children's television characters Billy (Hale) and Johnny (Pace), as well as the rock musicians Jed and Dave. Billy and Johnny first appeared in a series of sketches parodying educational television programmes aimed at pre-school children. Ainsley Harriott appeared in several of these sketches as their co-presenter, Willy.

Most sketches includes both Hale and Pace, though the black and white sketches featuring 1960s Beat Generation-era poet Groovy Wordbender are performed by Gareth Hale, whilst series one has a running gag featuring Norman Pace as a vet and a cow.

A number of their TV sketches caused controversy, especially the one in which they pretended to have microwaved a cat.

A number of writers worked on the series over the ten series, with a high number of writing duos contributing ideas for sketches including Carson & Tomlinson (script advisors Sean Carson and David Tomlinson), Nice & Smith and Hale & Pace themselves.

In March 2022, the series was acquired by That's TV for its comedy line-up which also included repeats of The Mrs Merton Show and Monty Python's Flying Circus.

=== Series list ===
Series	Episodes	UK air date	Director	Producer	Opening credits	Recurring sketches
1	7	2 October 1988 – 13 November 1988	Vic Finch	Alan Nixon	Each episode starts with a sketch before proceeding to the introduction which is a colourful montage of Hale & Pace. Both comedians have individual stills of them shot from the waist up and then shown in a quick sequence. A colourful background is used during the introduction consisting mainly of a purple/pink colour with splashes of yellow and green. At its end, the title of the show is shown with the names Hale (green colour) and Pace (yellow colour).	The Two Rons; Man with cow (Norman Pace); Billy & Johnny; Jed & Dave; The Swedes; "Readings from my latest anthology" by Groovy Wordbender; Man being greased, referencing The Singing Detective; Deliberate blooper segments; Antiques Roadshow; Several sketches on a live stage
2	6	1 October 1989 – 5 November 1989	David G. Hillier	Alan Nixon	Identical to the 1st series (1988).	The Two Rons; Billy & Johnny; Jed & Dave
3	6	30 September 1990 – 4 November 1990	David G. Hillier	Alan Nixon	Hale & Pace in an early 20th-century setting with Hale wearing an old hat and Pace wearing a monocle. Chickens, chicken feathers and a rubber chicken are being shaken around the room. The introduction finishes with a zoom in on their faces, at which point they both stick out their tongues, Hale's tongue having "Hale" written on it and Pace's showing "Pace". The "&" is written on Pace's hand, which is positioned behind them but between their two heads. Each show finishes with a nude shot of Hale & Pace's backsides, each with their name written on it.	Old men sitting in chairs talking; Ron & Ron's Gardening Tips (The Two Rons); Prisoner Cell Block H parody
4	6	29 September 1991 – 3 November 1991	David G. Hillier	David G. Hillier	A water theme is used for this series for the credits and ad breaks (the credits were designed by Jan Pinkava while he was starting out at Digital Pictures in London). Hale & Pace have the appearance of being submerged in water and focusing on fish swimming past them. A shark swims right to left across the screen and then opens its jaws to begin the show. (When cutting to commercials, the same shark shows Hale & Pace in its mouth.)	The Two Rons; Jed & Dave; Billy & Johnny; Surgery sketches; Hale and Pace in Spain
5	7	24 January 1993 – 7 March 1993			Identical to the 4th series (1991).	The Two Rons; Jed & Dave; Billy & Johnny; London Taxi drivers Steve and Frank; The Prophets, Brother Nathan and Brother Jeremiah; Jeffrey's crusade against fashion crimes
6	7	19 September 1993 – 31 October 1993			Hale & Pace logo on a coral snake design	The Two Rons; Jed & Dave; The Prophets, Brother Nathan and Brother Jeremiah; In Suspicious Circumstances
7	7	18 September 1994 – 30 October 1994			Hale & Pace dancing to "I Got You (I Feel Good)" in front of a black and white digital background. No formal title is displayed. Stage performances include a background prop with the letters "HALE" placed on top of "PACE". Each episode starts with the two stars coming on stage and having their jackets taken by different people each week.	Sister Wendy's Art Treasures; London Taxi drivers Steve and Frank; The Swedes, Sven & Benny (in a sauna); The Open University; Jeans adverts (Levi); Unnecessary Force Force; Mr. Poppy; Several sketches on a live stage
8	6	8 October 1995 – 19 November 1995	Peter Orton	Mark Robson	Same as previous series.	Billy & Johnny; Curly & Nige: (1) Hospital porters (2) Go camping; Jed & Dave on the road; London Taxi drivers Steve and Frank; John & Yokel; The Swedes, Sven & Benny (in a sauna)
9	7	5 January 1997 – 16 February 1997			Four separate pieces of the duo's faces are jumbled up before being assembled, their faces changing expressions whilst being put together. Once completed their names appear in a small board area. At the end of the introduction, the camera zooms in to the small board showing the show's title "Hale & Pace".	London Taxi drivers Steve and Frank; Waiter/s with "black pepper"; Are you nervous... nervous now?; Curly & Nige: (1) In the garage (2) At the D.I.Y shop; American sheriff & his deputy; Rappers with baggy clothes; Yorkshiremen; Crime boss & his muscle; Two redheads who copy the end of what people say; Transpotters; Elderly gentleman who can't swear; Meditating man who wishes for things to happen
10	6	23 July 1998 – 27 August 1998			Identical to the previous series.	The Dopplers

=== Spin-offs ===
Hale & Pace's characters "The Two Rons – also known as The Management" also had a spin-off series of their own called The Management which included a number of their regular cast in permanent positions and ran for a total of 6 episodes. This series was also released on video but strangely only 4 out of the 6 episodes. They also made several specials, such as the 1996 Showcase Hale & Pace Down Under from Australia and April Fools' Day.

=== Guest stars ===
In early series, Hale and Pace would feature little known performers such as Ainsley Harriott, Annette Badland and Caroline Quentin, who would become successful in their own right later in the 1990s, but did not have any 'famous for the time' stars in the series. Once Hale and Pace became household names, more widely known stars appeared in their shows, with the snooker players Steve Davis and Jimmy White playing foil to the two cabbies in one episode.

=== DVD box sets ===
All 10 series are now released on DVD, available in region 4 from Australia (No special features or extras, simple DVD transfer)

- Series 1 & 2 Alternative?
- Series 3 & 4 Alternative?
- Series 5 & 6
- Series 7 & 8
- Series 9 & 10

The show is rated M in Australia and R16 in New Zealand for its sexual references.

The complete first series doubled with the 1986 Christmas Special was released in a 2 disc DVD set in the UK on 12 March 2012 by Network. It was classified "12" by the BBFC.

== "The Stonk" ==
In 1991, Hale & Pace were part of a charity supergroup who released a single in aid of Comic Relief. Credited to Hale & Pace and the Stonkers, the record, called "The Stonk", was based on a fictitious dance craze and was co-written by the two comedians along with Joe Griffiths. The single was produced by Queen guitarist Brian May, who was also featured on the track and had his name printed on the front cover. Other musicians performing on the single, besides Brian May playing guitar, were Tony Iommi, David Gilmour and Nick Lowe on guitar, Neil Murray on bass guitar, Roger Taylor, Cozy Powell and Rowan Atkinson – appearing as his character Mr. Bean – on drums, Joe Griffiths on keyboards and Mike Moran on piano.

Comedians Steve Punt, Hugh Dennis, Rob Newman and David Baddiel appear in the video.

A UK number-one single for one week in March 1991, it was the UK's 22nd-best-selling single of the year. "The Stonk" was released as a joint-single with a track written and performed by the comedian Victoria Wood. Entitled "The Smile Song", the song was credited on the front of the single cover and listed as track 2 on the seven-inch and CD single (rather than B-side). However, the UK singles chart compilers (now the Official Charts Company) did not credit her with having a number one hit, in a situation similar to the fate of Big Audio Dynamite II's "Rush", the AA-side of preceding number one, "Should I Stay or Should I Go" by The Clash.

=== Charts ===
==== Weekly charts ====
Chart (1991)	Peak position
Europe (Eurochart Hot 100)	9
Ireland (IRMA)	10
UK Singles (Official Charts)	1
UK Airplay (Music Week)	56

=== Year-end charts ===
Chart (1991)	Position
UK Singles (OCC)	22

== Other appearances ==
As well as their 1991 single "The Stonk", the duo also appeared as their characters "The Two Rons" in a firework safety campaign run around Guy Fawkes Night, in public information films that were run for several years from the late 1980 to early 1990s, in slots often directly after Children's BBC, but also occasionally during ITV commercial breaks. "Da Doo Ron Ron", which their characters' catchphrase "I do, Ron, Ron" was a reference to, was coincidentally used in a rewritten form on the subject of firework safety in one of the PIFs.

They moved across to the BBC in 1997 and starred in the three-part series, Jobs for the Boys, a non-comedic show in which they took on a variety of employment challenges. One of these challenges was to write the UK entry for the Eurovision Song Contest. They were advised/mentored by Rick Wakeman, Bruce Welch (from The Shadows - UK entry 1975), Lynsey de Paul (UK entry 1977), Pearl Carr & Teddy Johnson (UK entry 1959), Cheryl Baker (from Bucks Fizz - UK entry 1981), Lee Sheriden and Nicky Stevens (from Brotherhood of Man - UK entry 1976), Björn Again, former Eurovision presenter Katie Boyle, Johnny Logan, Katrina Leskanich (from Katrina and the Waves - UK entry 1997), songwriter Don Black (lyricist), and radio presenter Ken Bruce.

The duo also appeared, briefly, as shop-keepers Harvey and Len, in Part One of the 1989 Doctor Who story Survival. This gave them the distinction of appearing in what turned out to be the last ever story in the show's original 1963–89 run.

Their dramatisation of the Dalziel and Pascoe detectives for ITV in 1994 did not lead to success, and the BBC later attempted the serialisations with more success, with Warren Clarke and Colin Buchanan in the title roles.

In 1998, Hale and Pace could be seen in a BBC One programme called Oddbods, with the shows written by the duo in association with Richard Parker. Two episodes were aired.

A hybrid variety/comedy/quiz/people-show h&p@bbc was launched in 1999 under the watch of the BBC's Head of Entertainment Paul Jackson who had worked with the duo prior to his appointment. h&p@bbc was a 40-minute show, a mix of comedy, celebrity quizzes and audience participation. It was initially scheduled for Wednesday nights after the Nine o'Clock News. The h&p@bbc show was criticised by The Independent's Brian Viner as being a throwback to low-budget quiz shows of the 1980s, and he considered the show's games to be a "derivative mish-mash".

Hale and Pace appeared working in a shoe shop in episode two of The Armando Iannucci Shows (2001). They appeared in the Christmas Special of the Gervais and Merchant show Extras, broadcast in December 2007. They appeared in several episodes of the 2018 season of Benidorm, playing a pair of financial fraud investigation officers.

== Reception ==
The first episode of Hale and Pace's ITV television series won the 1989 Golden Rose of Montreux award.

Television critic Victor Lewis-Smith once described the duo by saying "Gareth Hale is the unfunny one with the moustache and Norman Pace is the unfunny one without the moustache".
