= Norman Pace =

English actor (born 1953)

- Born: Norman John Pace; 17 February 1953 (age 73); Dudley, Worcestershire, England

Comedy career
- Years active: 1983–present
- Genres: Stand-up comedy, television, radio

Norman John Pace (born 17 February 1953) is an English actor and comedian, best known as one half of the comedy duo Hale and Pace with his friend and comic partner Gareth Hale. Both former teachers, they fronted several television programmes jointly, most notably Hale and Pace, Pushing Up Daisies, h&p@bbc and Jobs for the Boys.

== Early life ==
He grew up in Newark-on-Trent in Nottinghamshire. He attended the Magnus Grammar School. He then went to Avery Hill College, now the Avery Hill Campus of the University of Greenwich, in Eltham where he gained a BEd in 1975.

== Work with Gareth Hale ==
As straight actors they also fronted the original TV dramatisation of Dalziel and Pascoe, and in 1989 they guest-starred together in the Doctor Who serial Survival. Also in 1989, Hale and Pace won the Golden Rose of Montreux. In 2007 they appeared in the Christmas special of Extras playing themselves. In 2018 he was acting in the comedy TV series Benidorm with Gareth Hale.

== Later work ==
Norman Pace later began working in theatre and starred in Chicago at the Adelphi Theatre, Breakfast with Jonny Wilkinson and Our Man in Havana at the Nottingham Playhouse. In summer 2010 he appeared as the detective in a touring production of the Peter Gordon comedy Murdered to Death. In autumn 2013 he appeared as "The Showman" in Michael Eaton's Charlie Peace: His Amazing Life & Astounding Legend at the Nottingham Playhouse. In 2014 Pace was touring in a production of One Man, Two Guvnors. He was also a regular presenter for The Open on the Sky Poker channel.

In 2016 he toured with The Rocky Horror Show and from 2017 a new production of Hairspray, playing the role of Wilbur Turnblad. As of March 2022 he was still performing in this role. During 2024, he appeared as Claude in The Baker's Wife at the Menier Chocolate Factory in London.
