= Paris Theatre =

Former cinema and theatre in London

- Paris Studios
- Location within Central London
- Former names: Paris Cinema (1939–1940)
- Address: 12 Lower Regent Street
- Location: London, England
- Coordinates: 51°30′31″N 0°08′00″W
- Owner: BBC
- Capacity: < 400
- Type: Radio studio
- Current use: Fitness club
- Production: Radio comedy, Concerts

Construction
- Opened: April 1939
- Renovated: 1946
- Closed: 1995
- Years active: 1946–1995
- Architect: Robert Cromie

The Paris Theatre (also known as the Paris Studios) was originally a cinema located at 12 Lower Regent Street in central London which was converted into a studio by the BBC for radio broadcasts requiring an audience. It was used for several decades by the BBC as the main venue for comedy programmes broadcast on BBC Radios 2 and 4.

The venue had a capacity of under 400 and a stage roughly twelve inches from the floor. Shows recorded there included panel game shows such as I'm Sorry I Haven't A Clue, comedy such as Hi Gang!, Dad's Army, The Goon Show, Don't Stop Now - It's Fundation and non-audience shows such as The Hitchhiker's Guide to the Galaxy.

In addition to comedy, the BBC recorded many of the dramatical broadcasts by Raymond Raikes as well as by musical artists including acts such as AC/DC, Badfinger, the Beatles, David Bowie, Leonard Cohen 1968, Shakin' Stevens, Family, Streetwalkers, Jeff Beck, Deep Purple, Slade, Hawkwind, Status Quo, Sad Café, Dr. Feelgood, Mahavishnu Orchestra, Fleetwood Mac, Genesis, Led Zeppelin, James Taylor, Joni Mitchell, Weather Report, Queen, Pink Floyd, Nazareth, Barclay James Harvest, Rod Stewart, Magazine, Simple Minds, the Screaming Blue Messiahs, T. Rex, Ultravox, the Pretenders, Eden 1985, and the Wailers. Some of these performances were recorded in front of live studio audiences as part of the In Concert and Sounds of the Seventies series, and several of these acts have subsequently released tapes of sessions recorded at the studio, such as Led Zeppelin's BBC Sessions album. It was also the London home of the BBC's Radio 1 Club in the late 1960s and early 1970s.

The Paris Theatre closed in 1995, replaced by the BBC Radio Theatre in Broadcasting House. The closure was marked with a commemorative concert and broadcast of the last show ever to be recorded at the theatre, namely the final show in series two of The Skivers.
