= List of Extras characters =

The British television sitcom Extras centres on the main characters of Andy Millman, Maggie Jacobs and Darren Lamb, in addition to several more recurring characters.

== Main characters ==
=== Andy Millman ===
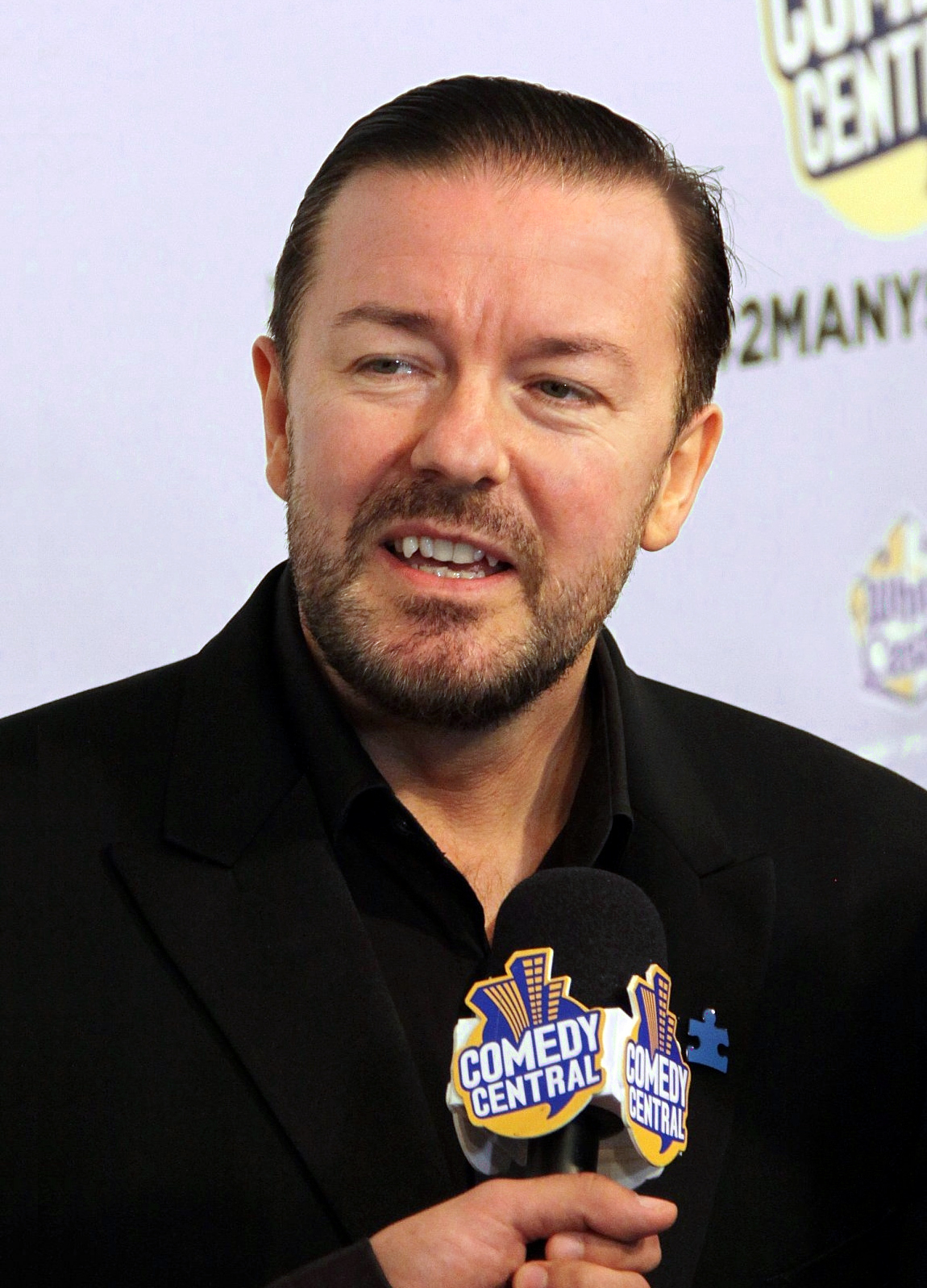
Ricky Gervais (pictured in 2010) played the lead, a down-on-his-luck actor

Portrayed by Ricky Gervais, Andrew "Andy" Millman is the lead character of Extras. Andy's dream to become an actor – he left his steady day job at NatWest in Wokingham in order to pursue it – is endlessly thwarted by the fact that his agent Darren Lamb is incompetent, circumstances seem to conspire against him, and the only work he can get is as a film extra. His best friend is fellow extra Maggie Jacobs, but her staunch desire to help, coupled with a lack of tact and intelligence, means that she more often than not causes him just as much trouble.

At the end of Series 1, Millman successfully managed to sell a sitcom called When the Whistle Blows, which proves to be a commercial success but a critical failure.

In contrast to Gervais' other famed role as David Brent, who, through his desire to be liked by those around him comes off as pathetic, Millman often makes little or no attempt to be liked – often being a downright curmudgeon – but frequently comes across as being a much more likeable character than Brent. This may be due to his increased sense of self-awareness and respect; when compared to Brent, Millman is fully aware of when he has stepped over the line and become genuinely offensive. Also, unlike Brent, who was largely in denial about the world around him, Millman is a more depressed and misanthropic character with a more realistic understanding of the world and how it works. Whereas Brent was based on a former boss of Gervais, Millman's personality is more autobiographical in origin.

A running joke is that Millman did not lose his virginity until the age of 28 (although the first time this is mentioned, Maggie says he was 22), and to a woman who looked like Ronnie Corbett (who turns up in a later episode as himself). Andy's nemesis throughout the programme is Greg Lindley-Jones, who also started out as an extra, but on heavy financial support from his parents, before finding success in a number of productions and becoming a well-respected actor.

=== Maggie Jacobs ===
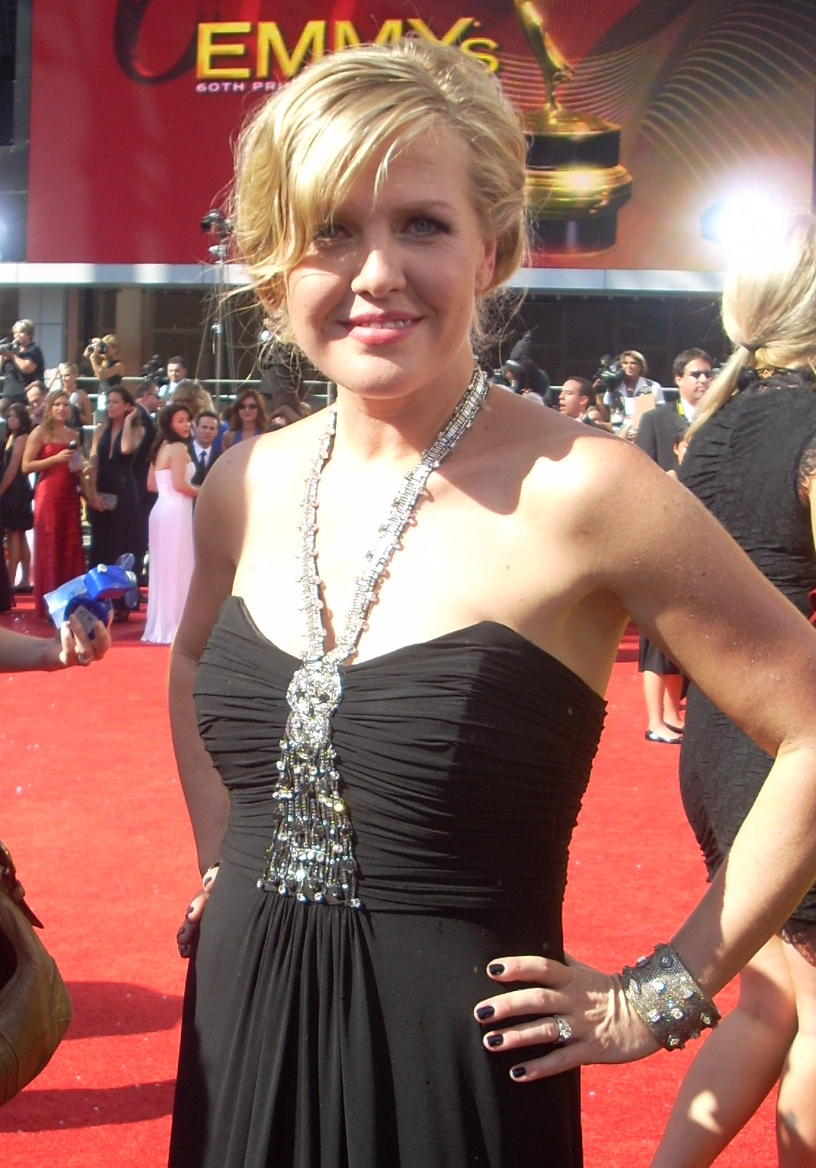
Ashley Jensen (pictured in 2008) played Maggie Jacobs

Portrayed by Ashley Jensen, Maggie Jacobs is characterised as a genuinely supportive and good-natured individual who only wants to help. Unfortunately for her and those around her, she is also portrayed as being rather socially inept and lacking in any sort of internal censor or common sense, which means that she is more likely to say precisely the wrong thing at the wrong time to the wrong person, and thus create more trouble for herself and those around her (especially Andy, whom she frequently embarrasses by inadvertently puncturing his pretensions towards being an actor). Although Maggie possesses no malicious intent, she also appears to be rather ignorant and poorly educated when it comes to matters of race and political correctness – which, when coupled with her general outspokenness, frequently results in her causing genuine offence through inadvertent insults and stereotypes. In series two her down-to-earth manner is shown to contrast greatly with the pretensions of Andy's new friends. Gervais has stated that he thinks the personality of Maggie resembles a female version of Karl Pilkington, whose friendship with Gervais and Merchant was developing during the time Extras was being written. During the series Andy even explains that he and Maggie are friends because she is so stupid and it amuses him, which is precisely what Gervais has said about Pilkington.

Maggie is rather man-hungry, and throughout the series she is constantly on the lookout for "Mr. Right." However, owing to circumstance and her aforementioned tendency to commit social faux pas, the relationships she starts with men throughout the series rarely last long. However, there have been instances in which the men she is interested in turn out to be very much less than desirable, through no fault of her own. In one episode she was constantly pestered and eventually kissed by Orlando Bloom, even though she had told him that she did not find him particularly attractive.

=== Darren Lamb ===
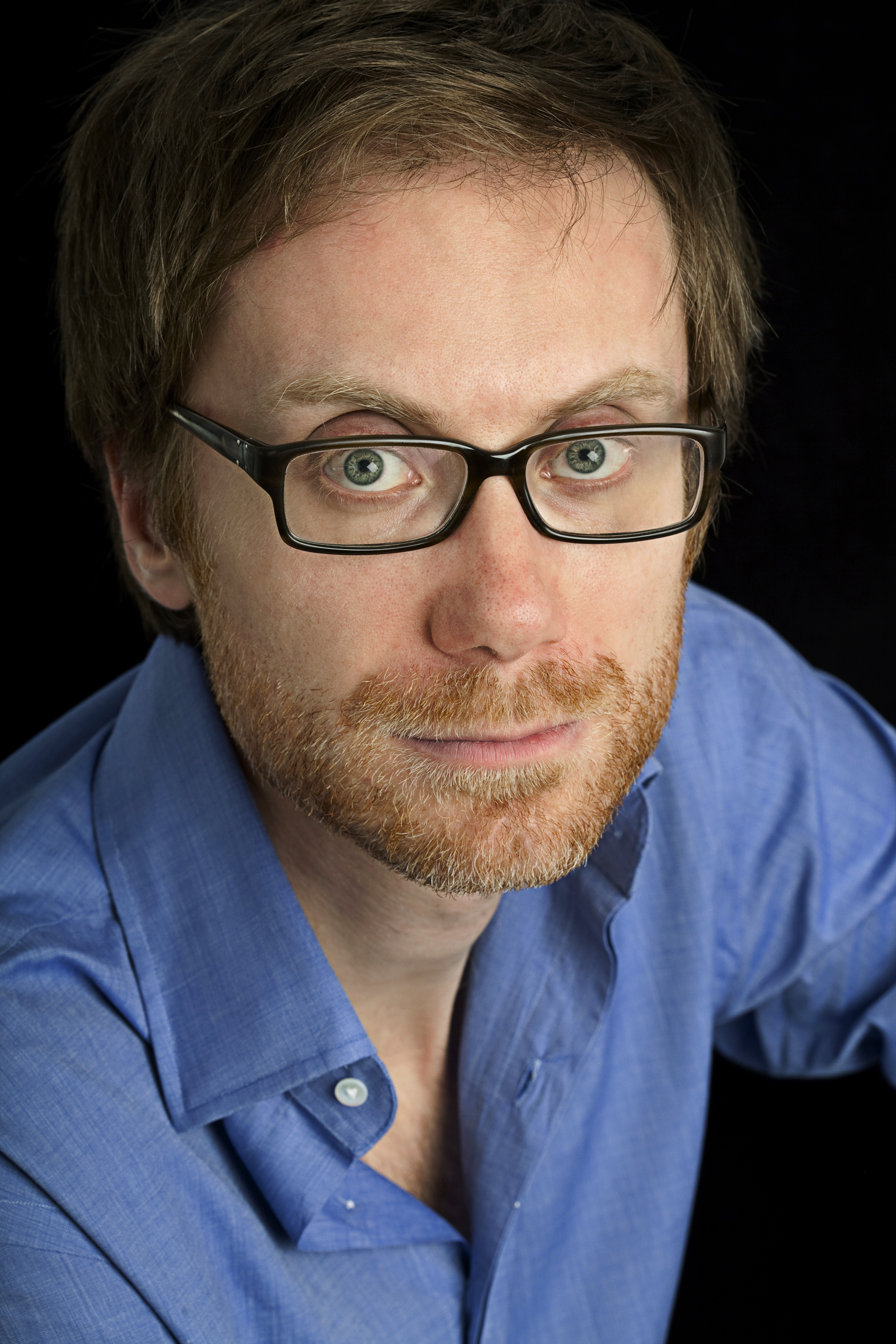
Stephen Merchant (pictured in 2009) played the lead's inept agent

Portrayed by Stephen Merchant, Darren Lamb is Andy Millman's agent. He is utterly incapable of breaking an act, and his usual negotiating tactic is to simply agree with whatever anyone else says, or suggest someone other than his client for the part. He is very good at deducting his 12.5% commission ("15% for adverts") despite frequently having done nothing to contribute to his act's success. For example, in series two episode two, whilst in the pub, he asks for £27.50 from Barry for the £220 he was paid for fixing someone's gutter, despite having no involvement in getting him the job. He can often be seen begging for this type of payment. His lack of professional skills is typified by the occasion he inadvertently left his office phone unplugged for two days without noticing. He is also known to make inappropriate remarks at the least helpful of times. Lamb works part-time at the Carphone Warehouse, but in Episode 4 of Series 2, he mentions he only works on Saturdays while "Narinder" is pregnant.

Despite these overwhelming examples of incompetence, Lamb is nevertheless the agent of the series' protagonist, the frustrated Andy Millman, who is more than aware of his agent's utter uselessness but nevertheless feels compelled to retain him out of a slightly perverse mixture of responsibility and sympathy. Lamb is also the agent of "Barry off EastEnders".

In episode six of the second series, an increasingly stressed Millman threatens to sack Lamb after he is caught masturbating and relaxing in his office. However, Lamb manages to arrange a meeting between Millman and his hero Robert De Niro, with the indication given that he managed to keep his job as a result.

Lamb does not have a regular girlfriend and his rather crude way of chatting up women (as seen in episode two of series two) means few have any wish to fulfil his sexual desires. In the fourth episode he actually managed to invite Maggie to his house, things go well until Lamb tries to break an unflushable faeces in his toilet into pieces with a whisk, causing Maggie to leave his house in disgust.

=== Barry off EastEnders ===
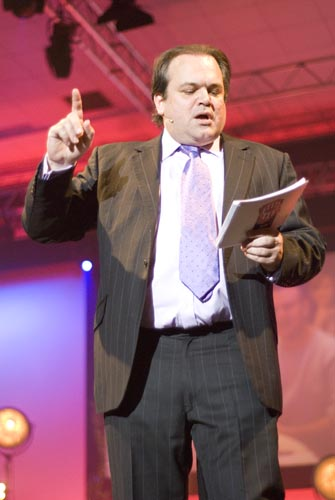
Shaun Williamson (pictured in 2008) played a fictionalised version of himself as a failed soap-opera actor

Shaun Williamson plays himself as one of Darren's clients. He used to play Barry Evans on the British soap opera EastEnders, but left to pursue a multi-million pound contract elsewhere and failed. Lamb does not use his real name, but instead calls him "Barry off EastEnders" or just "Barry" and occasionally "Barr". This also extends to other characters as seen in episode 1.2, where fellow EastEnders actor Ross Kemp only seems to know Shaun Williamson after being told his EastEnders character name. He carries an air of accepted defeat, and helps Lamb around his office, appearing to be marginally the more competent of the two. They later team up with another ex-EastEnder, Dean Gaffney, at the Carphone Warehouse. Andy and Dean are the only ones who ever call him "Shaun".

=== Greg Lindley-Jones ===
Portrayed by Shaun Pye, Greg Lindley-Jones is an arrogant and mean-spirited RADA graduate and Andy's enemy. Like Andy, he started out as an extra, struggling to get more significant roles. However, unlike Andy, he has managed to secure lines in various productions such as The Bill and consequently he possesses a rather high opinion of himself and is constantly bullying Andy. Andy rarely gets ahead in his encounters with Greg. In the second episode of Series 1 it is revealed he is subsidised by his wealthy parents. While both Andy and Greg are suitably advantaged so that they can afford to work full-time in minor acting roles, Greg's through a privileged background and Andy's through a previous career at the bank. Greg is notably annoyed when Andy tries to celebrate his BBC series triumph with fellow extras in Season 1 Episode 6.

Greg gains more recognition as a stage, television and film actor. In the Christmas special he boasts to Andy how the fictitious film Byron: A Life, in which he starred alongside Clive Owen, is number one in the UK film charts and number two in America. Andy becomes envious of the fact Greg is now a Hollywood actor whilst he is only recognised for featuring in a lowbrow sitcom.

== Other recurring characters ==
- Bunny (Gerard Kelly) – three episodes, a camp pantomime director whose daughter appears in the first series. He reappears in the Sir Ian McKellen episode and the Christmas Special.
- Damon Beesley (Martin Savage) – the very camp comedy script writer who is brought in to work alongside Andy.
- Iain Morris (Guy Henry) – the Head of Comedy at the BBC. Although initially appearing helpful in getting the script ideas developed, Morris is one of the contributors to stealing artistic direction of When the Whistle Blows from Andy. He has a strong friendship with Damon Beesley, agreeing with virtually anything the latter suggests for the sitcom no matter how ridiculous (such as a curly hair wig because 'curly is funny'), and becomes increasingly arrogant and condescending when Andy raises his concerns about it. He is also gay and takes it very personally when any implied homophobia is used in his presence. He appears in three episodes as well as a minor role in the Christmas Special.
- "Make-up woman" (Sarah Preston) – three episodes. Asks for signed pictures but no one can remember her name.
- Liza Tarbuck – although she mainly appears in character as Rita in When the Whistle Blows, she is also seen in make-up as herself.

== When the Whistle Blows ==
Ray Stokes

Ray is the manager, played by Andy Millman, in turn played by Ricky Gervais. His catchphrase is an incredulous "Are you having a laugh!? Is he/she having a laugh?". The character was based on a man Millman worked for before deciding to pursue acting full-time, and originally his catchphrase was merely something Millman wrote in because it was something that man used to say. Millman's co-writer decided to develop it into a catchphrase. To play the part of Ray, Millman is forced into wearing oversized glasses and a curly black wig to add the "hilarity", despite the fact that the real Ray Stokes did not look like this. Many of Ray's mannerisms, such as raising and lowering his glasses, suggest that he could be a parody of Reg Holdsworth, an old character from the long-running British soap Coronation Street.

Rita

Rita is played by Liza Tarbuck, who also sings the When the Whistle Blows theme song. She is a single parent and is the central, straight character of the show. By the Christmas Special, she is married.

Gobbler

Gobbler is a large, unintelligent character, played by Andrew Buckley. His inability to understand his co-workers' jokes often prompts his catchphrase, "I don't get it." It is suggested that he has appalling personal hygiene. He becomes intelligent after falling off a donkey in the Christmas Special.

Brains

Brains, played by Jamie Chapman, is the stereotypical smart one of the group, sporting glasses, a quiff hairstyle and a pedantic tone. His rather detailed knowledge of all subjects does not impress Ray, who will inevitably come out with the "Are you 'avin' a laugh?" line. He "comes out" in the Christmas Special.

Kimberley

Kimberley, played by Sarah Moyle, is the only other female character on the show. She seems to lead a rather homely lifestyle. In the Christmas Special, she received a promotion.

Keith

Keith is played by TV presenter Keith Chegwin in the pilot episode. His character was originally called "Alfie", but a frustrated Millman changed it because Keith Chegwin was confused at being addressed with a different name. We are told he is always late for work, but in this instance turns up late because he was at his sister's funeral. This also confused Chegwin, who confided: "the thing is, my sister's not dead".

=== Others ===
There are relatively few other characters in the sitcom, but they include Chris Martin (playing himself), who promotes a new Coldplay album, and a Japanese couple, who also spawn another catchphrase "Velly velly solly" (as seen on a T-shirt worn by a crowd member in the Christmas Special). Ray's wife is mentioned, but never appears, which is an old cliché of British comedy, e.g., Minder and Dad's Army. Andy appears in a dual role as Ray's twin sister.
