= Gareth Hale =

Anglo-Welsh comedian

- Born: Gareth Irvin Hale; 15 January 1953 (age 73)
- Education: University of Greenwich
- Occupations: Actor and comedian
- Known for: Comedy duo Hale and Pace; Family Affairs (TV series) as Doug McKenzie

Gareth Irvin Hale (born 15 January 1953) is a British comedian and actor, who is best known as one half of the comedy duo Hale and Pace, with his friend and comic partner Norman Pace.

== Biography ==
Hale and his comedy partner are both former teachers. Their comedy partnership fronted several television programmes, most notably Hale and Pace (1988–1998), Pushing Up Daisies (1984), h&p@bbc (1999) and Jobs for the Boys (1997). They made a guest appearance together in Survival, a 1989 Doctor Who serial.

Hale was a regular on the Channel 5 soap opera Family Affairs, playing Doug MacKenzie (2003–2005). In 2007 Hale and Pace appeared in the Christmas special of Extras, called "The Extra Special Series Finale", playing themselves. In 2008, Hale joined the cast of The Royal in the role of the head porter, and in late 2009 he played Scrooge in an adaptation of Charles Dickens' A Christmas Carol.

In 2015 Hale appeared as Commissioner Busby in the BBC TV series Father Brown (episode 3.15 "The Owl of Minerva"). In April 2015 Hale provided the station voice for Sam FM, a music based radio station covering Southern England. In 2015 he made a guest appearance as Teddy Arseholes in an episode of the BBC comedy series Cradle to Grave based on the autobiography of Danny Baker, Going to Sea in a Sieve. In 2018 Hale appeared in the comedy TV series Benidorm with Norman Pace. In 2021, Hale played Grandpa Maury in Nickelodeon series Goldie's Oldies.
