= Extras (TV series) =

British television sitcom (2005–2007)

- Genre: Sitcom
- Created by: Ricky Gervais; Stephen Merchant
- Written by: Ricky Gervais; Stephen Merchant
- Directed by: Ricky Gervais; Stephen Merchant
- Starring: Ricky Gervais; Ashley Jensen; Stephen Merchant; Shaun Williamson; Shaun Pye
- Ending theme: "Tea for the Tillerman" by Cat Stevens
- Country of origin: United Kingdom
- Original language: English
- No. of series: 2
- No. of episodes: 13 (list of episodes)

Production
- Executive producers: Jon Plowman; Ricky Gervais; Stephen Merchant
- Producer: Charlie Hanson
- Camera setup: Single-camera
- Running time: 30 mins (regular episodes); 90 mins (special)

Original release
- Network: BBC Two (UK) (series 1–2); BBC One (UK) (special); HBO (US)
- Release: 21 July 2005 – 27 December 2007

Extras is a British sitcom about extras working in television, film, and theatre. The series was co-produced by the BBC and HBO, and written and directed by Ricky Gervais and Stephen Merchant, both of whom starred in it. It follows the lives of Andy Millman (Gervais), his friend Maggie Jacobs (Ashley Jensen) and Andy's substandard agent and part-time retail employee Darren Lamb (Merchant) as Millman muddles through life as an anonymous "background performer" who eventually finds success as a B-list sitcom star.

Extras has two series of six episodes each as well as a Christmas Special. The first episode aired in the UK on 21 July 2005 on BBC Two and on 25 September 2005 on HBO in the US. The second series premiered in the UK on BBC Two on 14 September 2006 and began airing in the US on HBO and in Australia on ABC on 14 February 2007. The Christmas Special aired on 27 December 2007 on BBC One and on 16 December 2007 on HBO. Both series are available on DVD and, at various times, through streaming services in the UK and the US.

The series is filmed in a more traditional sitcom style than the mockumentary style used by Gervais and Merchant in their previous series The Office. Each episode has at least one guest star: a television or film celebrity who plays what Gervais and Merchant have referred to as "twisted" versions of themselves—an exaggerated or inverted parody of their public persona. The show has been critically acclaimed, and has a Metacritic score of 81/100.

== Cast and characters ==
- Ricky Gervais as Andy Millman
- Ashley Jensen as Maggie Jacobs
- Stephen Merchant as Darren Lamb (credited as "Agent")
- Shaun Williamson as Barry from EastEnders (himself)
- Shaun Pye as Greg Lindley-Jones

== Plot ==
Andy Millman is an aspiring actor who can only find work as an extra, which he calls being a "background artist" as a means of making the work seem more dignified. Andy is accompanied on his various projects by his platonic best friend and fellow extra, Maggie Jacobs. Maggie is well-meaning but ditzy, often missing obvious social cues and failing to exhibit appropriate tact and subtlety in conversations. Unlike Andy, Maggie has no aspirations toward being anything more than an extra. Andy's agent, Darren Lamb, has no real experience in the field of entertainment. He is incompetent, often taking no steps at all to find work for Andy, and even discouraging potential employers from hiring his client due to his flabby physique, age, and lack of acting experience. Darren is assisted by former soap opera star Shaun Williamson, who plays himself. Lamb frequently tries to undermine Andy by suggesting Williamson (who Lamb refers to by his former EastEnders character name, "Barry") is better suited for various acting roles that are offered to Andy.

Fed up with life as an extra who is always being cut out of scenes just as he manages to get his face on camera, Andy shamelessly kisses up to celebrities and producers in an effort to try to get screen time or a line of dialogue. Although often successful in these endeavours, circumstances always arise that prevent Andy from advancing his career. Reasons include celebrities confessing that they have no real power to help, or (more often) Andy or Maggie inadvertently offending the star which results in his immediate dismissal from the set. In the conclusion of season one, Andy delivers a sitcom script he has written to Patrick Stewart, who, in turn, passes it along to the BBC through his production company. Andy gets a meeting with BBC comedy producers who greenlight his project and agree to allow him to play the starring role in the show.

Series Two largely chronicles Andy's frustrations with his sitcom—When the Whistle Blows—which is heavily rewritten by BBC producers, resulting in it being a lowest-common-denominator comedy that relies on a multitude of catchphrases, offensive stereotypes and silly costumes for cheap laughs. Although the sitcom is commercially successful, pulling six million weekly viewers, it is a flop with critics who mercilessly bash both it and Andy. Andy periodically gets a chance to expand his repertoire in film and on stage but manages to ruin every opportunity that comes his way by either refusing to take direction, or by once again offending bigger stars than himself.

In the series' 90-minute finale, the sitcom has made Andy financially successful and recognisable to many but he is increasingly frustrated with the show's quality and with his career not moving forward. Andy is convinced to fire Darren as his agent and become a client of a larger, more professional firm which he believes will accelerate his path upward. After taping a Christmas Special for When the Whistle Blows, he announces to the live studio audience that he is quitting the series effective immediately. His career falls into total stagnation and Andy is forced to take bit parts on various long-running British television series such as Doctor Who and Hotel Babylon. Eventually, his agent ceases to take his calls. Andy's relationship with Maggie sours as he frequently ignores her and spends all of the time they spend together complaining about not getting the opportunities he feels he deserves.

When he crashes his agent's lunch meeting at a posh restaurant, he is bluntly told that he will never realise his dreams of having fame, fortune, prestige and respect. Crushed, Andy reluctantly agrees to lower his expectations for the sake of remaining modestly famous and successful and is cast in Celebrity Big Brother. While staying in the Celebrity Big Brother house, Andy openly reflects upon the price of fame and grows increasingly disenchanted with the culture of celebrity worship that has manifested itself throughout Western society.

His despondency culminates in an emotional breakdown during a conversation with the other housemates. He tearfully turns to the camera and apologises to Maggie, who is watching the broadcast from her flat, for ignoring her and not heeding her advice to be grateful for the things he has managed to achieve. He voluntarily departs the house, ending his tenure on the show. Moved by the unexpected outpouring of emotion, a group of journalists eagerly awaits Andy's appearance at a press conference. Andy's agent returns and tells him that his emotional turn has instantly skyrocketed Andy's profile and that a number of A-list stars are requesting to meet him. As his agent prepares to introduce him to the throng of waiting press, Andy quietly slips out the back door of the studio where Maggie is waiting for him in her car. They drive off together with Andy seemingly turning his back on show business and accepting a life of anonymity.

== Episodes ==
Series	Episodes	Originally released	
Series	Episodes	First released	Last released
1	6	21 July 2005	25 August 2005
2	6	14 September 2006	19 October 2006
Christmas special		16 December 2007	

There are twelve regular episodes and a 90-minute Christmas special. When the first series was originally broadcast in the UK, the episode featuring Ben Stiller was broadcast first, followed by the Ross Kemp and Vinnie Jones episode the following week. When the first series was shown in North America, another order was used:

1. Kate Winslet
2. Ben Stiller
3. Ross Kemp & Vinnie Jones
4. Les Dennis
5. Samuel L. Jackson
6. Patrick Stewart

The DVD release has the Ross Kemp episode first, followed by Ben Stiller.

== When the Whistle Blows ==
When the Whistle Blows is the show-within-a-show sitcom created, co-written by and starring Andy Millman. It was first mentioned in episode 1.3, as a script that Millman had written and given to Darren, who neglected to read it (in a recurring joke, he frequently forgot the show's name, often calling it When the Wind Blows and even confusing it with The Wind in the Willows). In the first-season finale, the script is turned into a sitcom on BBC One, after Millman gives the script to Patrick Stewart. Excerpts from the sitcom are featured in the second season, and many of the Extras second-season plotlines revolve around Millman's experiences on and around the show.

When the Whistle Blows is set in a Wigan factory canteen. The humour is broad and lowbrow in the manner of many catchphrase-based sitcoms. The show's main catchphrase, "Are you 'avin' a laugh?", is spoken by Millman. The show is unpopular with critics but popular with the public. It receives a BAFTA nomination, although Millman suspects it is simply to make up the numbers, and in the end it loses to an unspecified programme by Stephen Fry.

Millman is deeply unhappy with the show, feeling that too many people have interfered with his original ideas in the hunt for ratings. It appears that Millman originally set out to do a comedy similar to The Office, with true-to-life characters in a realistic work environment, without a studio audience or canned laughter. After being forced to collaborate and compromise many of his ideas with BBC producers, the show is transformed into lowest-common-denominator fare, with each character having his/her own catchphrase, repeated ad nauseam to the delight of its 6 million viewers. The show is further debased by the unexplained guest appearance of Coldplay's Chris Martin in episode 2.4, which bears no relation to the plot and which Millman openly opposes, going so far as to utter the on-camera line, "Chris Martin, what are you doing in a factory in Wigan? It's mental!"

The presence of studio audiences, canned laughter, and the reliance on funny wigs, costumes and catchphrases for humour is a comment on British comedy hits such as Little Britain and The League of Gentlemen. Many people that Millman sees at the recording of the pilot wear T-shirts displaying comedy catchphrases such as "Wassup", "It's Chico Time", "I'm a lady!", "Am I bovvered?" and "Garlic bread?" (These shirts are not shown in the version screened in the US). Some of the show's reviews refer to it as a "time warp comedy", and Millman's character talks about 1970s catchphrases such as Mr Humphreys' "I'm Free" (from Are You Being Served?) and Frank Spencer's "Ooh Betty" (from Some Mothers Do 'Ave 'Em), suggesting that it is also partly sending up 1970s British comedy. In episode 2.5, Germaine Greer suggests that When the Whistle Blows is "sub Carry On".

In recent years, the spoof has been compared to real-life sitcom Mrs Brown's Boys, in respect to its animated opening and that it was critically panned yet a ratings winner.

== Music ==
The closing title track is "Tea for the Tillerman", written and performed by Cat Stevens, the title track of his album Tea for the Tillerman. The fourth episode of the second series of Extras features a cover of the song performed by Chris Martin of Coldplay. The same episode also uses the song "Oh, Pretty Woman" by Roy Orbison.

The song in the Christmas Special, highlighting Maggie's depression after she hits bottom and quits acting, is "This Woman's Work" by Kate Bush. When Andy is having a bad time at The Ivy restaurant and leaves Maggie on her own, The Smiths' song "Please, Please, Please, Let Me Get What I Want" can be heard.

== Guest star cancellations and replacements ==
According to a segment in the extras section of the Series 1 DVD, Jude Law was scheduled to appear in one of the episodes, after meeting Gervais backstage on the Late Show with David Letterman, but had to pull out due to film commitments. Gervais and Merchant had to scramble to find a replacement, with Leonardo DiCaprio being considered and doggedly pursued. A featurette on the first series DVD release, "Finding Leo", consists of late-night video camera footage (shot mostly by Merchant) chronicling Gervais' desperate but ultimately unsuccessful attempts to contact DiCaprio's representatives. Law was ultimately replaced by Patrick Stewart in the series 1 finale, although a poster for the Jude Law film Alfie appeared at the end. Other actors who did not appear in Extras, despite initial reports from Gervais that they would, include Madonna, Brad Pitt and Tom Cruise. Keith Harris turned down the part after reading the script, subsequently telling The Independent, "This isn't clever writing, it's pure filth". Keith Chegwin performed in his place.

== Awards and nominations ==
Extras received 3 BAFTA TV Award nominations in 2006, including Best Comedy Performance for Ashley Jensen, Best Writer for Ricky Gervais and Stephen Merchant, and Best Situation Comedy. In 2007, Gervais and Merchant were separately nominated for Best Comedy Performance (Gervais won).

Award	Category
Rose d'Or	Best Sitcom (2006); Best Sitcom Actress – Ashley Jensen (2006)
Golden Globe Award	Best Television Series – Musical or Comedy (2008)
British Academy of Film and Television Arts	Best Comedy Performance – Ricky Gervais (2007)
British Comedy Awards	Best Television Comedy Actress – Ashley Jensen (2005); Best Television Comedy Newcomer – Ashley Jensen (2005); Best Comedy Actor – Stephen Merchant (2006)
BANFF World Television Awards	Best Comedy Actress – Ashley Jensen (2006)

=== Primetime Emmy Awards ===
Year	Category	Nominee(s)	Episode	Result	Ref.
2006	Outstanding Guest Actor in a Comedy Series	Patrick Stewart	"Patrick Stewart"	Nominated	
2006	Outstanding Guest Actor in a Comedy Series	Ben Stiller	"Ben Stiller"	Nominated	
2006	Outstanding Guest Actress in a Comedy Series	Kate Winslet	"Kate Winslet"	Nominated	
2006	Outstanding Writing for a Comedy Series	Ricky Gervais & Stephen Merchant	"Kate Winslet"	Nominated	
2007	Outstanding Directing for a Comedy Series	Ricky Gervais & Stephen Merchant	"Orlando Bloom"	Nominated	
2007	Outstanding Guest Actor in a Comedy Series	Ian McKellen	"Sir Ian McKellen"	Nominated	
2007	Outstanding Lead Actor in a Comedy Series	Ricky Gervais	—	Won	
2007	Outstanding Writing for a Comedy Series	Ricky Gervais & Stephen Merchant	"Daniel Radcliffe"	Nominated	
2008	Outstanding Made for Television Movie	Ricky Gervais, Stephen Merchant, Jon Plowman, Charlie Hanson	"Christmas Special"	Nominated	
2008	Outstanding Directing for a Miniseries, Movie or a Dramatic Special	Ricky Gervais & Stephen Merchant	"Christmas Special"	Nominated	
2008	Outstanding Lead Actor in a Miniseries or a Movie	Ricky Gervais	"Christmas Special"	Nominated	
2008	Outstanding Single-Camera Picture Editing for a Miniseries or a Movie	Richard Halladey and Graham Barker	"Christmas Special"	Nominated	
2008	Outstanding Supporting Actress in a Miniseries or a Movie	Ashley Jensen	"Christmas Special"	Nominated	
2008	Outstanding Writing for a Miniseries, Movie or a Dramatic Special	Ricky Gervais & Stephen Merchant	"Christmas Special"	Nominated	
