= List of Extras episodes =

The following is a list of episodes from the BBC television series Extras. In total, there are thirteen episodes and two series of Extras (six in each series and one 90-minute Christmas special). Extras was created by Ricky Gervais and Stephen Merchant; they also directed and starred in this series.

== Series overview ==
Series	Episodes	Originally released	
Series	Episodes	First released	Last released
1	6	21 July 2005	25 August 2005
2	6	14 September 2006	19 October 2006
Christmas special		16 December 2007	

== Episodes ==
=== Series 1 (2005) ===
No. overall	No. in series	Title	Written and directed by	Original release date	UK viewers (millions)
1	1	"Ben Stiller"	Ricky Gervais & Stephen Merchant	21 July 2005	4.83
Andy and Maggie are best friends who are playing extras in Do Angels Bleed?, the film Ben Stiller is directing, which is based on the life of Goran, an Eastern European man whose wife and son were killed in the Yugoslav Wars. Stiller is an arrogant and boastful bully with little concern for those he is directing. Nevertheless, Andy attempts to get a speaking part by befriending Goran, who eventually gets Andy a spoken line. Jackie, who works on the set, invites Andy and Maggie to her birthday party. He fabricates a reason not to attend, but Maggie fails in her attempt to. He decides to go when he hears that the film's producer, Martin, will be there. At the party, Andy tries to ingratiate himself with Martin by pretending to share Martin's liking of Japanese cinema. Meanwhile, Maggie becomes attracted to John, who works on the production, but is put off when Andy points out he has one leg shorter than the other. In attempting to defend Maggie from accusations of ableism, Andy and Maggie leave after offending Martin's Japanese-American girlfriend with racist stereotypes. Back on the set, Andy gets in an argument with Stiller just before shooting his scene, and Stiller kicks him off.
2	2	"Ross Kemp and Vinnie Jones"	Ricky Gervais & Stephen Merchant	28 July 2005	3.62
Andy is working on Horatio, a television period drama starring Ross Kemp. Andy's rival, Greg, is working on a film with Kemp's rival, footballer Vinnie Jones, in the adjacent studio building. As well as claiming he can get Andy a line on the show, Kemp claims he has had SAS training and tells Andy that he is more of a "hard man" than Jones and that SAS actually stands for 'Super Army Soldiers'. Andy relays this information to Greg, who tells Jones. Angered by this, Jones confronts Kemp, who denies having said anything, and cowers at Jones's threats. After this embarrassment, Kemp admits to a disillusioned Andy that none of his prior claims was true, that his reputation as a hard man is fake and that wherever he works, he is bullied and cannot get Andy a line on the show.
3	3	"Kate Winslet"	Ricky Gervais & Stephen Merchant	4 August 2005	3.59
Working as extras on the set of Sisters of Mercy, a Holocaust film, Andy and Maggie befriend the star Kate Winslet, who hopes finally to win an Oscar with her role as a nun sheltering Jews during the Holocaust (coincidentally, she later won an Oscar for her role in the 2008 Holocaust film The Reader). Maggie is in a relationship with a set assistant who wants her to talk dirty with him over the phone, but Maggie has no idea what to say. Winslet helpfully volunteers explicit advice for Maggie on the subject, but Maggie's boyfriend later dumps her when he catches Andy and Winslet making lewd gestures to each other behind his back. Atheist Andy claims to be Catholic when he is attracted to a Catholic fellow extra, whose sister (Francesca Martinez) has cerebral palsy, and asks him if he believes no one will have to deal with illnesses in Heaven. However, a "get together" with her and "some friends" turns out to be Bible study group and Andy's deceit is exposed, despite his efforts to conceal the truth.
4	4	"Les Dennis"	Ricky Gervais & Stephen Merchant	11 August 2005	3.93
Andy's agent secures him the role of the (very camp) Genie in a pantomime version of Aladdin starring Les Dennis. Fifty-year-old Dennis is engaged to attractive 26-year-old Simone Reynolds (Nicky Ladanowski) but is also on the verge of a breakdown owing to the many setbacks in his career. When Andy sees Dennis's fiancée kissing a stagehand, he becomes very protective of Dennis and at first tries to keep him from finding out. But when Dennis decides maybe it would be best if he splits up with Simone, Andy reveals the truth about her. Devastated, Dennis stops in the middle of the first performance of the pantomime to berate the futility of his life and the lack of enthusiasm from the audience. Maggie comes to visit Andy during rehearsal and bumps into an old friend, Lizzie Bunton (Rebecca Gethings), who is dancing in the chorus line. Lizzie recalls how they first met working together on the BBC children's drama The Orphans of Penny Farthing Lane. Her closeted gay father, "Bunny" (Gerard Kelly), the play's director, is very controlling of Lizzie's life and treats her like a child. Lizzie invites Maggie to her 29th birthday party, which she reluctantly agrees to attend. She finds out on arrival she is 30 years younger than all the other guests. Bunny admonishes his daughter for messing up a rendition of "Making Your Mind Up" by Bucks Fizz during the party. Lizzie then tells Bunny she is not happy pursuing a showbiz career. Maggie is soon made to leave the party by Bunny after encouraging her friend to find her own way in life.
5	5	"Samuel L. Jackson"	Ricky Gervais & Stephen Merchant	18 August 2005	3.58
Samuel L. Jackson is starring as a maverick American cop in Fatal Error, a British police film, and a fellow extra (Steve Speirs) forfeits the opportunity to do a scene with Jackson, to Andy's benefit. The fellow extra tells Andy tragic stories about people whom he has known. When he uses the favour he did for Andy to pressure him into being his friend, Andy resorts to lies and excuses to try to shake him off. Owing to the man's insistence, Andy caves in and agrees to have dinner with him, though Andy feels obliged to assure the other restaurant patrons that he and his dinner companion are not a couple. The man's demeanour proves to be too much, so a frustrated Andy twice plunges his face into his soup after being invited to the Ben Elton musical We Will Rock You, before abruptly leaving. Maggie is attracted to a young mixed race actor, Dan (Michael Wildman). Despite some initial misunderstandings owing to her over-sensitivity about race, she successfully asks him out on a date, but when he sees her try to hide her golliwog, he ends the date early. When she chats with Jackson on set the day after, she confuses him with Laurence Fishburne. Andy tries to save the ailing conversation but instead makes things significantly worse, resulting in Andy forfeiting the line he had earlier managed to get with Jackson. Additional celebrity guest star: Patrick Malahide
6	6	"Patrick Stewart"	Ricky Gervais & Stephen Merchant	25 August 2005	3.86
Andy and Maggie are working on a production of Shakespeare's The Tempest alongside Patrick Stewart. Eager to get his sitcom script noticed, Andy gives a copy to Stewart, who in turn tells Andy about his own script: a lewd film in which he will star as a man who can undress women with his mind. Stewart agrees to circulate Andy's script, and the BBC invite Andy for a meeting. Andy is asked to rewrite his script with staff writer/producer Damon Beesley (Martin Savage) with a view to a pilot episode being filmed. But when Andy complains to Maggie about how annoyingly camp Damon can be, and she later repeats Andy's apparently homophobic remarks to Damon, the BBC threaten to pull the plug on Andy's show. A furious Andy berates Maggie at her flat, demanding she 'sort herself out' resulting in her clearing out her toys and straightening her hair. After Andy apologizes to Damon, Damon forgives him and work on the pilot resumes, and Andy and Maggie make peace. The conflict in the second series of the BBC meddling with Andy's sitcom is hinted at when Damon insists that Andy's old boss saying "Are you 'avin' a laugh?" should become a catchphrase for the show.

=== Series 2 (2006) ===
No. overall	No. in series	Title	Written and directed by	Additional celebrity guest star(s)	Original release date	UK viewers (millions)
7	1	"Orlando Bloom"	Ricky Gervais & Stephen Merchant	Keith Chegwin, Liza Tarbuck and Sophia Myles	14 September 2006	3.62
Maggie appears as an extra in a courtroom drama with Orlando Bloom and Sophia Myles. Bloom arrogantly refuses to believe that Maggie does not find him attractive and repeatedly voices his dislike of Johnny Depp. Andy's new sitcom, When the Whistle Blows, is being filmed. He is disappointed that his script has been reworked to include broad humour and an over-reliance on catchphrases. When his attempts to intervene result in him being threatened with the possibility of returning to the status of a mere extra, Andy backs down and agrees to make and star in a show he hates. Darren attempts to persuade Andy to give Shaun Williamson his role.
8	2	"David Bowie"	Ricky Gervais & Stephen Merchant	none	21 September 2006	3.84
The critical response for the first episode of When the Whistle Blows is entirely negative. However, Andy is encouraged by the viewing figures of 6.2 million and being recognised by fans – though he is annoyed at requests to repeat his catchphrase. Shaun takes Andy to a celebrity bar that he used to frequent, and, despite being shown to the VIP area, Andy finds himself on the receiving end of insults from several people there who openly mock and disdain him. This is made worse when their group is quickly forced to vacate the VIP area when David Bowie and his entourage appear. Andy tries to talk to Bowie about his situation, but this backfires when Bowie makes up a song ridiculing him. Andy reluctantly returns to his local pub to seek recognition from the people he had previously rejected and accepting them – despite them not being the fans he wants.
9	3	"Daniel Radcliffe"	Ricky Gervais & Stephen Merchant	Warwick Davis, Diana Rigg, Phillip Schofield, Fern Britton, Nick Ferrari, Matthew Wright, Lowri Turner, Rufus Jones and Richard & Judy	28 September 2006	3.46
Andy receives a bit part in a new fantasy film starring Daniel Radcliffe, who fancies himself a teenage Romeo and tries to seduce every woman he meets – including Maggie – and then blaming it on someone else every time he gets caught. Over lunch, Daniel invites himself to join Andy and Maggie and accidentally flicks a condom onto the head of Dame Diana Rigg. Andy takes Maggie out for a meal and inadvertently offends the mother of a teenager with Down syndrome, leading to an increasingly hysterical reaction in the British media, who take his comments out of context. Andy manages to quell the anger, but, back on the film set, he gets into a fight with actor Warwick Davis over remarks Andy privately made to Maggie – which she later repeats to Davis's fiancée. During the altercation, Andy accidentally knees Davis in the face knocking him out cold, leading to the loss of his bit part and further embarrassment from the tabloids.
10	4	"Chris Martin"	Ricky Gervais & Stephen Merchant	Ronnie Corbett, Richard Briers, Moira Stuart, Davina McCall, Patricia Potter and Stephen Fry	5 October 2006	3.60
Andy makes a charity appeal video and meets Chris Martin from Coldplay, who appears as a shameless self-promoter interested only in advertising his album. Martin requests to make a cameo on When the Whistle Blows and appears on the show to play "Fix You" despite Andy insisting against it. Despite angry reviews at the shameless celebrity appearance on his sitcom, Andy is nominated for a BAFTA. Through the misendeavours of agent Darren and friend Maggie, Andy manages to upset both Richard Briers and Patricia Potter, an ex-girlfriend, who goes on to humiliate him from the stage. Co–nominee Stephen Fry wins the award in Andy's category and privately rebukes Andy for his sitcom's use of laugh tracks, silly wigs and catchphrases. Darren then manages to get himself and Andy banned from all BAFTA events when they are caught alongside a drug-taking Ronnie Corbett.
11	5	"Sir Ian McKellen"	Ricky Gervais & Stephen Merchant	Germaine Greer, Mark Kermode and Mark Lawson	12 October 2006	3.66
With the critical reaction to his sitcom getting more scathing, Andy asks Darren to find him some serious theatre work as a way of regaining some reputation. He is recommended to Ian McKellen, and is cast in a play about a homosexual relationship – "A Month of Summers". When his upper school friends led by Steve Sherwood (Jonathan Cake) turn up for the first night, and with McKellen's sudden decision that he should kiss his male co-star, Andy feels increasingly uncomfortable to the point of leaving the play midway through the first performance. Darren asks Maggie on a date, which comes to an awkward conclusion.
12	6	"Jonathan Ross"	Ricky Gervais & Stephen Merchant	Robert De Niro and Robert Lindsay	19 October 2006	3.85
Convinced that he has outgrown his sitcom and his agent, Andy becomes detached from his friends after appearing on Friday Night with Jonathan Ross and becoming friends with Ross. Andy is also getting very sick of Darren's incompetence and sets him a task: find a way for him to meet Robert De Niro or be fired. Despite making excuses, Andy is coerced into visiting a boy who is in hospital with cancer and asks Maggie to go with him. Robert Lindsay, who appeared on the Ross show with Andy, is incensed that he, the more famous and talented actor (according to him), was not asked to visit the ailing child and gate-crashes the scheduled visit. Lindsay becomes livid when the sick child shows no recognition of Lindsay's earlier work, especially his appearances as Wolfie on 1970s sitcom Citizen Smith. Just as Andy is about to fire Darren when he catches him masturbating over a pornographic pen, Darren tells Andy he has arranged a meeting with De Niro. The meeting time conflicts with one of Andy's scheduled visits to the sick boy, but guilt at the burden he is imposing on Maggie combined with his suspicion of Darren's empty promises forces Andy to keep his appointment with the boy at the cost of meeting De Niro. Lamb is able to pacify De Niro with the pornographic pen, and, at the hospital, Andy receives a call from Lamb and De Niro, who invite Andy to meet up at a pub, which he and Maggie accept.

=== Christmas special (2007) ===
No. overall	No. in season	Title	Written and directed by	Additional celebrity guest star(s)	Original release date	UK viewers (millions)
13	1	"Christmas Special"	Ricky Gervais & Stephen Merchant	Clive Owen, George Michael, Gordon Ramsay, David Tennant, Hale & Pace, Lionel Blair, Dean Gaffney, June Sarpong, Lisa Scott-Lee, Chico Slimani, Jonathan Ross, Karl Pilkington and Vernon Kay	16 December 2007 (US); 27 December 2007 (UK)	5.63
After three series of When the Whistle Blows, Andy is more famous than ever. He can get a table at the exclusive Ivy Restaurant without booking, and he has moved to a posh new flat on Hampstead Heath, as well. However, Andy is still not happy with his life, especially as his arch-nemesis Greg has the high-brow roles and critical respect Andy wants. With a new blockbuster film opening to rave reviews, Greg's portrayal of Percy Shelley alongside Clive Owen's Byron has earned him a firm place on the A-list. Fortunately, Greg's agent offers to represent Andy, as well, which means Andy can finally hand Darren Lamb his walking papers – or at least leave a message to that effect. Andy's new agent Tre Cooper's plan is to get Andy "to the top of the B-list" as soon as possible. However, Andy refuses to resort to appearing on red carpets and being photographed with a famous girl on his arm. Things are made worse when Andy's attempt to appear sophisticated during an interview backfire leaving him looking foolish. Andy also completely fails to notice things are not going nearly as well for Maggie. Although Tre secures her a small part in Clive Owen's new film, she decides to stop being an extra after Owen and the director come up with a bit of staging that involves Owen flinging manure in Maggie's face. With no experience in any other line of work, Maggie has to resort to being a cleaner to pay the rent, which she can no longer afford, and so is forced to move from her flat to a dingy little bedsit. Since Andy now phones only when he needs her to help him with some scheme or other, Maggie is left entirely to her own devices. Nearly destitute and thoroughly despondent, she pops in at Darren's new (and former) employer, the Carphone Warehouse, to see whether he can offer her a place alongside former EastEnders co-stars Shaun Williamson and Dean Gaffney, who have also resorted to working there. With a decent agent on board, Andy abruptly quits his sitcom, which infuriates the head of BBC comedy. Although he expects himself to be inundated with acting offers, he instead finds himself with even less work than he had before he fired Darren. Tre will not return his calls, so Andy is forced to accept acting gigs that he sneered at only a few months ago (specifically, roles on Doctor Who and Hotel Babylon) just to keep himself in the public eye. Andy finally manages to track down his agent, who tells Andy that he will never be able to have the career he wants and forces him to choose between either "fame and fortune" or "integrity and respect", but not both together. Andy chooses fame and fortune and begs Tre to pull whatever strings are necessary in order to get him back on television. Andy finds that the strings Tre has offered to pull land him in the latest cast of Celebrity Big Brother, but Andy has no idea who anybody else is (apart from Lionel Blair); the other house members include June Sarpong, Lisa Scott-Lee, X-Factor finalist Chico Slimani, a woman who leaked a sex tape of herself on the Internet, and a mother whose son was murdered. He quickly realises that by appearing on a show in which everyone is so desperate for fame that they voluntarily "hand in their dignity at the door", rather than bolster his career, what he has actually done is just the opposite. After making an impassioned speech to this effect on camera, at the same time using the opportunity to make a heartfelt and tearful apology to Maggie, who is watching at home, Andy walks off the show. Ironically, Andy's Big Brother speech gives him exactly the kind of attention and respect he has always wanted. Although he finds himself suddenly a media darling, with his agent fielding calls from the likes of Elton John and David Beckham, Andy decides that the only place he really wants to be is anywhere Maggie wants to go. Happily reunited, the two drive off down the motorway towards Heathrow Airport.
