= Priston Mill =

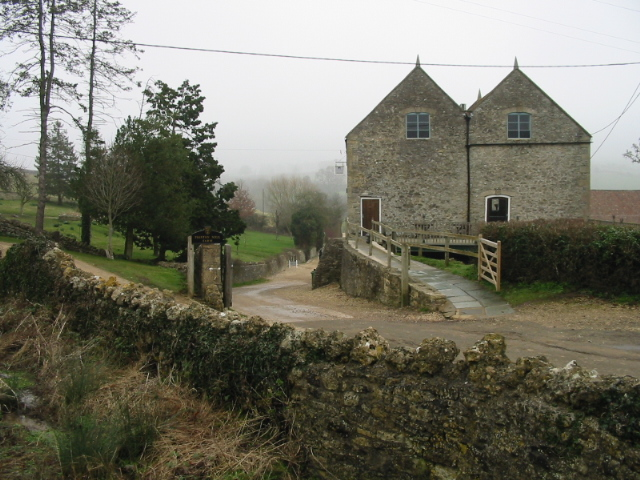
- Priston Mill on a foggy February morning

General information
- Coordinates: 51.3518°N 2.4394°W
- Year(s) built: 18th century

Website
- www.pristonmill.co.uk

Priston Mill is a Grade II listed former watermill in Somerset, England. It is about 4 miles (6 km) south-west of the city of Bath and is used as a venue for weddings and other gatherings.

A Priston Mill was granted by the king to the monks of Bath Abbey in 931, though the current four-storey structure dates from the 18th century. It is powered by a 25-foot (8 m) overshot water wheel which is maintained in working condition.

Next to the mill is a tithe barn that was built in the late 18th to 19th century. Like the mill itself, the barn is Grade II listed.
