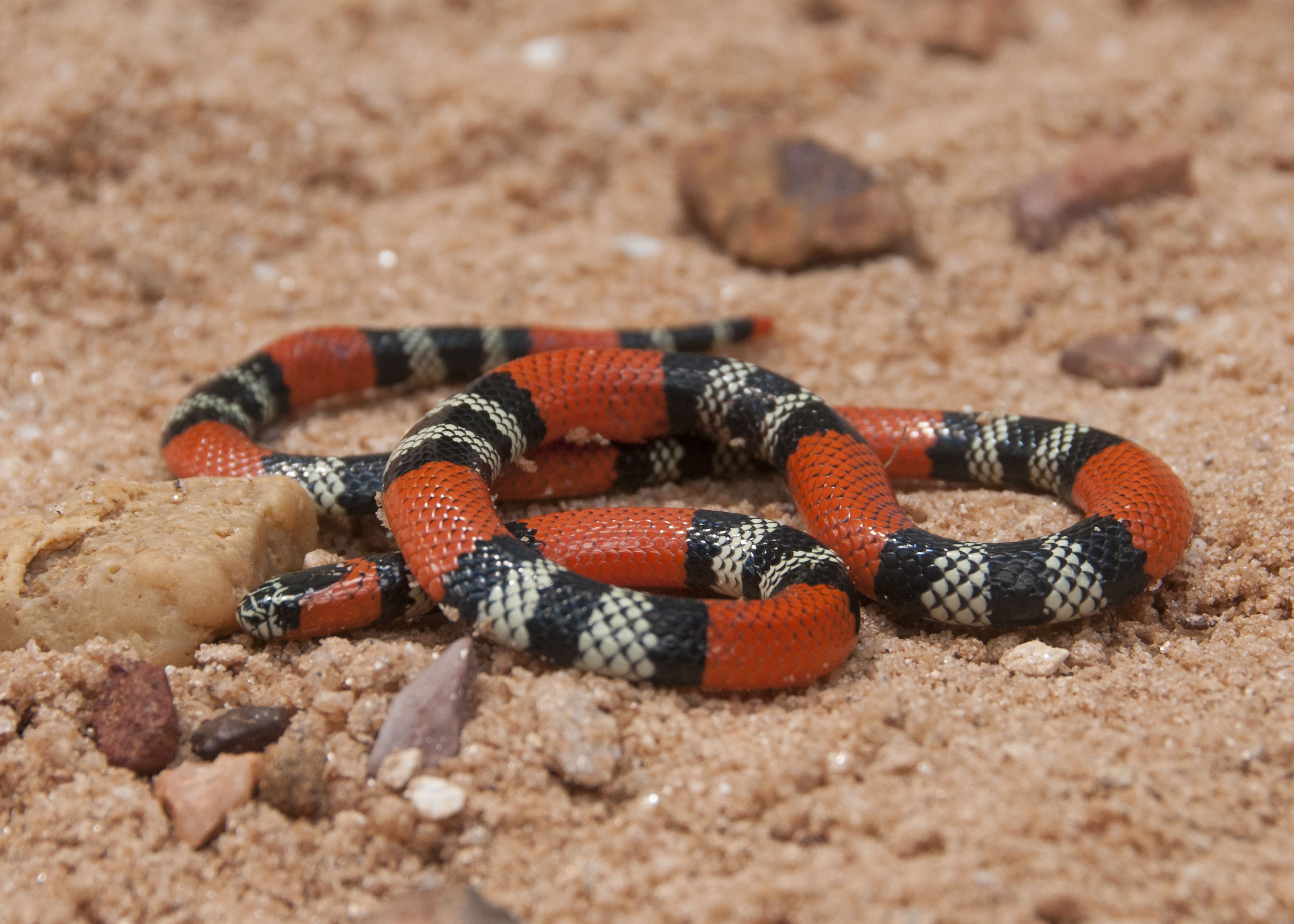

Conservation status
- Least Concern (IUCN 3.1)

Scientific classification
- Kingdom: Animalia
- Phylum: Chordata
- Class: Reptilia
- Order: Squamata
- Suborder: Serpentes
- Family: Elapidae
- Genus: Micrurus
- Species: M. frontalis

Binomial name
- Micrurus frontalis (A.M.C. Duméril, Bibron & A.H.A. Duméril, 1854)
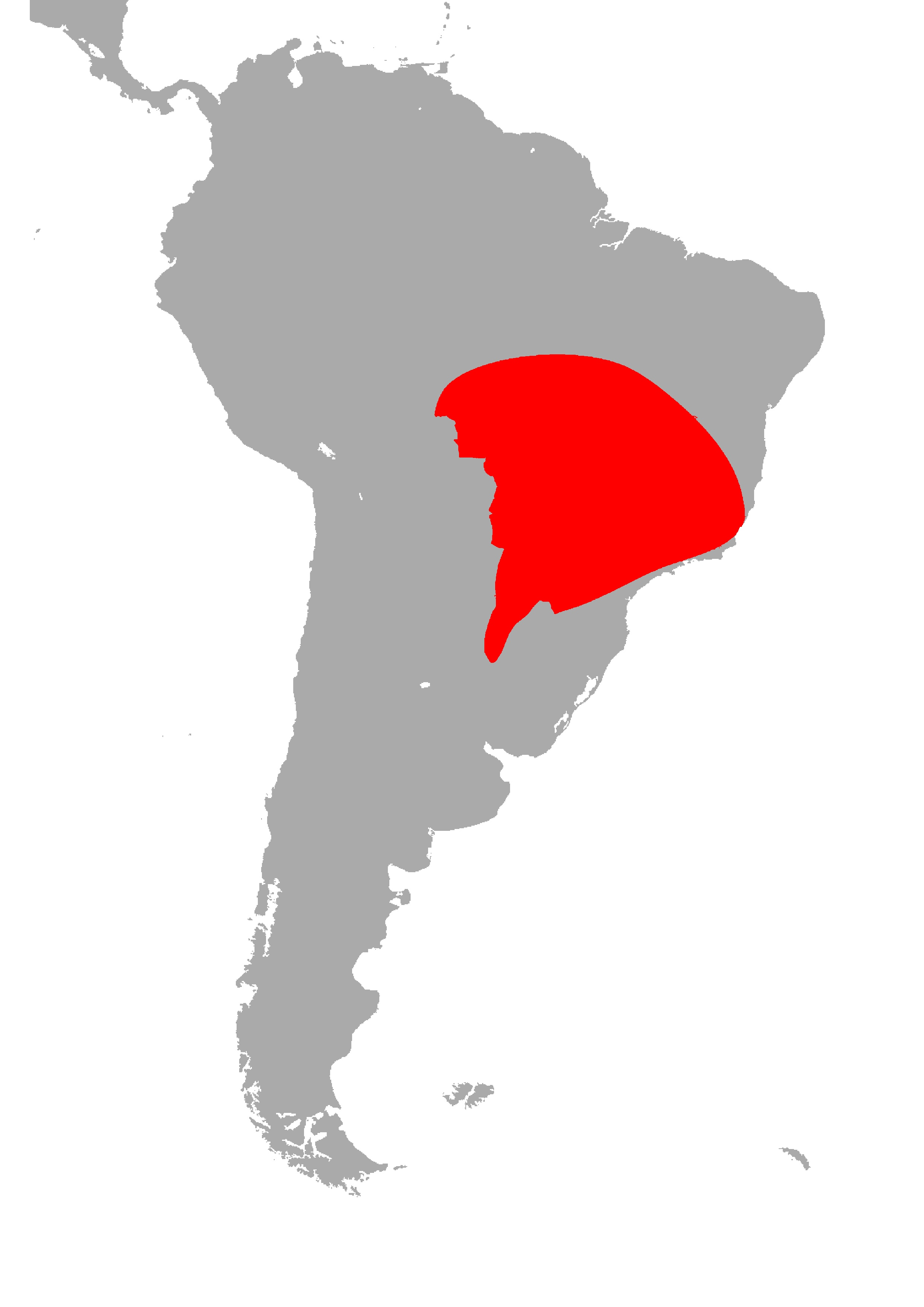

Synonyms
- Elaps frontalis A.M.C. Duméril, Bibron & A.H.A. Duméril, 1854; Micrurus lemniscatus multicinctus Amaral, 1946; Micrurus frontalis multicinctus Amaral, 1946

= Micrurus frontalis =

Species of snake

Micrurus frontalis, also known commonly as the short-tailed coral snake, the southern coral snake, cobra coral de rabo curto in Brazilian Portuguese, and coral cola corta in South American Spanish, is a species of highly venomous snake in the family Elapidae. The species is native to eastern South America. There are no recognized subspecies.

== Description ==
Large for its genus, Micrurus frontalis grows on average to a total length (tail included) of 75 cm (30 in), with a maximum reported total length of 164 cm (65 in). Many adults are 65–100 cm (26–39 in) in total length.

The color of the head varies, with a gray pigment on the top of the snout. The body pattern consists of very wide red rings that are separated by a series of 10–15 narrower black triads. Each triad consists of three black rings separated by white rings. The red dorsal scales have black tips. The tail has two complete triads.

In this species of New World coral snake there is little difference in scale counts between sexes. Males have 213–230 ventrals and 19–25 subcaudals, and females have 218–232 ventrals and 19–22 subcaudals.

== Behavior ==
Micrurus frontalis is a nocturnal, terrestrial, and fossorial snake, which digs in loose soil or plant litter. It has been one of the main accident-causing coral snakes in southeastern South America, although it is not relatively aggressive towards humans.

== Reproduction ==
Micrurus frontalis has oviparous reproduction, although data on eggs and clutch size has not been reported.

== Geographic distribution ==
Micrurus frontalis is found in south-central Brazil, Paraguay, and northern Argentina.

== Habitat ==
The preferred natural habitats of Micrurus frontalis are humid forests, tropical and subtropical deciduous forests, savannas, sandy and rocky areas, and secondary vegetation such as pastures and agricultural land, close to marshes and streams. It inhabits lowlands, from sea level to an elevation of 700 m (2,300 ft).

== Diet ==
Micrurus frontalis preys upon lizards and other snakes, including blind snakes. Cannibalism has been reported in this species.

== Venom ==
Like all elapids in Brazil except Micrurus corallinus, the venom of Micrurus frontalis has post-synaptic neurotoxins that bind to terminal motor acetylcholine receptors. The venom is composed of low molecular weight polypeptides, which are rapidly absorbed by the body after inoculation, and symptoms can appear in minutes. The venom acts peripherally, blocking neuromuscular transmission. Muscle paralysis is a consequence of the action of the neurotoxins with the neurotransmitter by the nicotinic receptor on the end plate.

At the site of the bite, edema and paresthesias occur. The initial systemic symptoms of most coral snake accidents include eyelid ptosis and diplopia, which are followed by facial muscle paralysis, visual impairment, anisocoria, dysarthria, dysphagia, salivation, and generalized loss of muscle strength. In severe cases, life-threatening respiratory arrest occurs, with patients requiring artificial ventilation. The median lethal dose is 22 μg for mice weighing 4–29 grams, and 0.69 mg/kg. The estimates of average venom yield range between 10 and 30 mg (dry weight), depending on the source. The estimated lethal dose for an adult human is only 5–7 mg (dry weight).
